= Anouk discography =

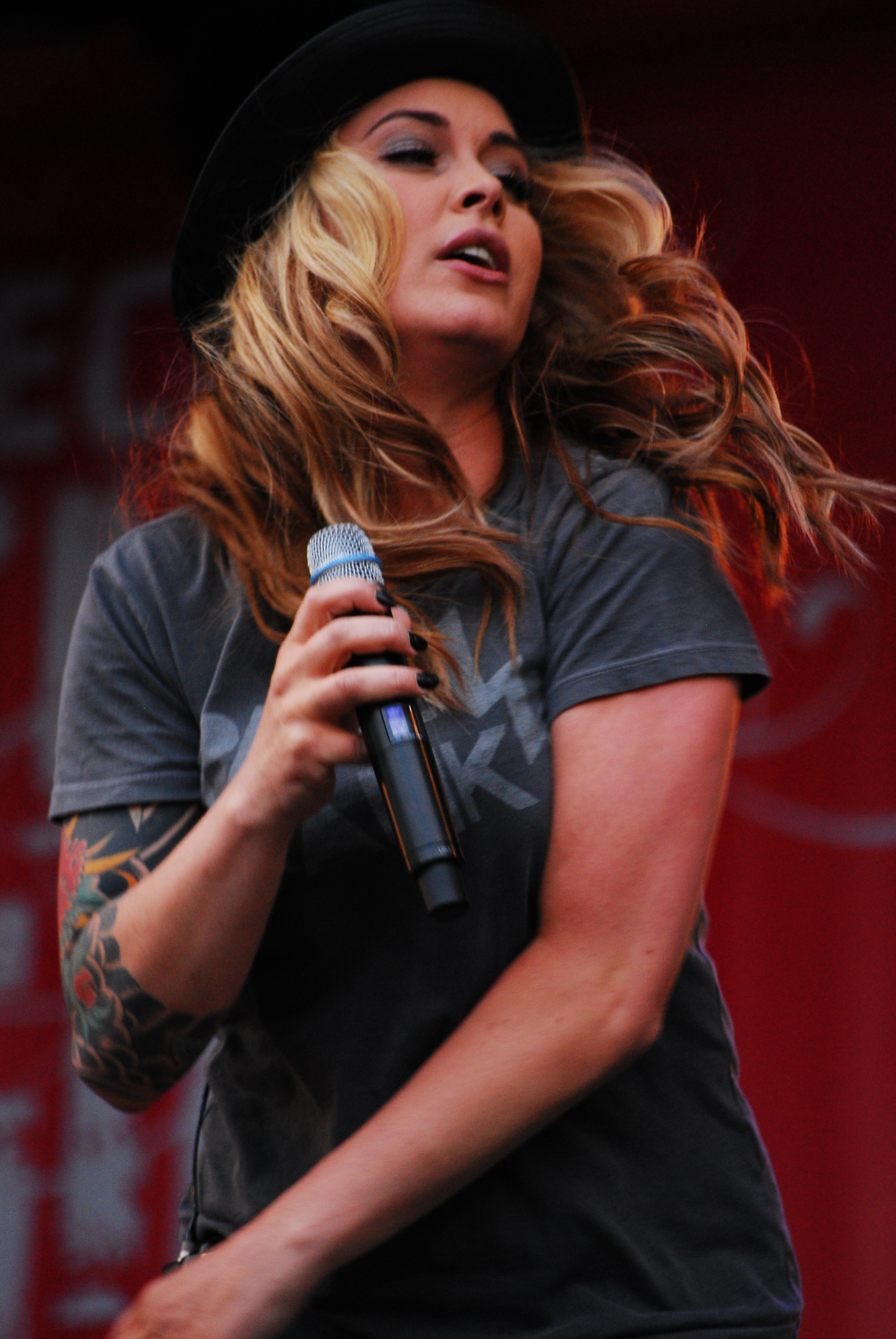
- Anouk performing in 2008
- Studio albums: 14
- Extended plays: 1
- Live albums: 5
- Compilation albums: 1
- Singles: 30
- Video albums: 5
- Promotional singles: 5

The discography of Dutch singer-songwriter Anouk consists of fourteen studio albums, four live albums, one compilation album, one extended play (EP), twenty-eight singles as a solo artist, two singles as a featured artist, five promotional singles and five video albums.

Anouk's debut single, "Mood Indigo", was released in 1996 and became a moderate hit in her native Netherlands. Its follow-up, "Nobody's Wife", was released the following year. After peaking at number two on the Dutch Top 40, the single became a European hit, entering the top ten in Sweden, Norway, Denmark and Finland. Both singles were included in her first studio album. Titled Together Alone, it topped the Dutch Albums Chart and also achieved commercial success across Europe.

With her second album, Urban Solitude, Anouk failed to repeat her international success, but consolidated her career in the Netherlands and in Flanders. As of today, she has achieved eight number-one albums in her country, including the compilation Lost Tracks, featuring B-sides and alternate versions of her previous hits, and the live album Live at Gelredome, released in 2008.

== Albums ==
=== Studio albums ===
List of albums, with selected chart positions and certifications
Title	Details	Peak chart positions										Certifications
Title	Details	NL	AUT	BEL (FL)	FIN	FRA	GER	ITA	NOR	SWE	SWI	Certifications
Together Alone	Released: 15 October 1997; Label: Dino Music; CD, 2× CD, MC, LP	1	42	6	8	42	72	12	6	3	34	NVPI: 4× Platinum; BEA: Gold; FIMI: Platinum; GLF: Gold
Urban Solitude	Released: 9 November 1999; Label: Dino Music; Format: CD	1	—	20	—	—	—	—	—	—	—	NVPI: Platinum; BEA: Gold
Graduated Fool	Released: 22 November 2002; Label: Dino Music; Format: CD	3	—	5	—	—	—	—	—	—	—	NVPI: Gold
Hotel New York	Released: 3 December 2004; Label: EMI Records; Format: CD	1	—	1	—	—	—	—	—	—	—	NVPI: 3× Platinum; BEA: Platinum
Who's Your Momma?	Released: 29 November 2007; Label: EMI Records; Format: CD, digital download	1	—	4	—	—	—	—	—	—	—	NVPI: 2× Platinum; BEA: Gold
For Bitter or Worse	Released: 18 September 2009; Label: EMI Records; Format: CD, LP, digital download	1	—	2	—	—	—	—	—	—	—	NVPI: 3× Platinum; BEA: Gold
To Get Her Together	Released: 20 May 2011; Label: EMI Records; Format: CD, LP, digital download	1	—	4	—	—	—	—	—	—	—	NVPI: 2× Platinum
Sad Singalong Songs	Released: 17 May 2013; Label: Goldilox; Format: CD, LP, digital download	1	—	5	—	—	99	—	—	—	—	NVPI: Platinum
Paradise and Back Again	Released: 21 November 2014; Label: Goldilox; Format: CD, LP, digital download	1	—	10	—	—	—	—	—	—	—	NVPI: Platinum
Queen for a Day	Released: 4 March 2016; Label: Goldilox; Format: CD, LP, digital download	1	—	10	—	—	—	—	—	—	—	NVPI: Gold
Fake It Till We Die	Released: 21 October 2016; Label: Goldilox; Format: CD, LP, digital download	2	—	21	—	—	—	—	—	—	—	
Wen d'r maar aan	Released: 12 October 2018; Label: Goldilox; Format: CD, LP, digital download	1	—	12	—	—	—	—	—	—	—	
Deena & Jim	Released: 3 November 2023; Label: Goldilox; Format: CD, LP, digital download	1	—	84	—	—	—	—	—	—	—	
Set This Thing on Fire	Released: 11 April 2025; Label: Universal; Format: CD, LP, digital download	3	—	107	—	—	—	—	—	—	—	
"—" denotes items which were not released in that country or failed to chart.

=== Compilation albums ===
List of albums, with selected chart positions and certifications
Title	Details	Peak chart positions		Certifications
Title	Details	NL	BEL (FL)	Certifications
Lost Tracks	Released: 29 March 2001; Label: Dino Music; Includes previously unreleased songs	1	5	NVPI: Gold
Greatest Hits	Released: 6 November 2015; Label: Goldilox	1	6	NVPI: Gold
"—" denotes items which were not released in that country or failed to chart.

=== Live albums ===
List of albums, with selected chart positions and certifications
Title	Details	Peak chart positions		Certifications
Title	Details	NL	BEL (FL)	Certifications
Update	Released: 5 January 2004; Label: Dino Music; Format: CD	9	38	
Anouk Is Alive	Released: April 28, 2006; Format: CD, DVD, digital download; Label: EMI	8	5	NVPI: Gold
Live at Gelredome	Released: 24 June 2008; Label: EMI; Format: CD, DVD, digital download	1	16	NVPI: Gold
Live at Toomler	Released: 23 November 2011; Label: EMI; Format: CD, digital download	—	—	
Live at Symphonica in Rosso	Released: 14 March 2014; Label: Goldilox Music; Format: CD, digital download	1	18	
"—" denotes items which were not released in that country or failed to chart.

== Extended plays ==
List of EPs, with selected chart positions
Title	Details	Peak chart positions	
Title	Details	NL	BEL (FL)
Trails of Fails	Released: 22 April 2022; Label: Goldilox; Format: CD, LP, digital download	3	169

== Singles ==
List of singles, with selected chart positions, showing year released and album name
Title	Year	Peak chart positions									Certifications	Album
Title	Year	NL	BEL (FL)	DEN	FIN	FRA	GER	NOR	SWE	UK	Certifications	Album
"Mood Indigo"^{[A]}	1996	46	—	—	—	—	—	—	—	—		Together Alone
"Nobody's Wife"	1997	2	5	6	9	34	87	2	2	—	NVPI: Platinum; BEA: Gold; GLF: Platinum; IFPI NOR: Platinum	Together Alone
"It's So Hard"	1998	23	43	—	—	—	—	—	—	—		Together Alone
"Sacrifice"	1998	7	47	—	—	—	—	—	—	—		Together Alone
"R U Kiddin' Me"	1999	2	50	—	—	—	—	—	—	—		Urban Solitude
"The Dark"	2000	8	—	—	—	—	—	—	—	—		Urban Solitude
"Michel"	2000	3	11	—	—	—	—	—	—	—		Urban Solitude
"Don't"^{[B]}	2001	13	63	—	—	—	—	—	—	—		Urban Solitude
"Love"^{[C]}	2001	42	—	—	—	—	—	—	—	—		Lost Tracks
"Everything"^{[D]}	2002	12	63	—	—	—	—	—	—	—		Graduated Fool
"I Live for You"^{[E]}	2003	44	—	—	—	—	—	—	—	—		Graduated Fool
"Hail"	2003	31	—	—	—	—	—	—	—	—		Graduated Fool
"Girl"	2004	2	3	—	—	—	—	—	—	—		Hotel New York
"Lost"	2005	2	7	3	—	—	—	2	—	—		Hotel New York
"Jerusalem"	2005	33	44	—	—	—	—	—	—	—		Hotel New York
"One Word"	2005	4	29	—	—	—	—	—	—	—		Hotel New York
"Good God"	2007	7	13	—	—	—	—	—	—	—		Who's Your Momma
"I Don't Wanna Hurt"^{[F]}	2008	4	51	—	—	—	—	—	—	—		Who's Your Momma
"Modern World"	2008	3	33	—	—	—	—	—	—	—		Who's Your Momma
"If I Go"	2008	15	—	—	—	—	—	—	—	—		Who's Your Momma
"Three Days in a Row"	2009	1	19	—	—	—	—	—	—	—		For Bitter or Worse
"Woman"	2009	3	32	—	—	—	—	—	—	—		For Bitter or Worse
"For Bitter or Worse"	2010	14	—	—	—	—	—	—	—	—		For Bitter or Worse
"Lovedrunk"^{[G]}	2010	43	—	—	—	—	—	—	—	—		For Bitter or Worse
"Down & Dirty"^{[H]}	2011	13	70	—	—	—	—	—	—	—		To Get Her Together
"I'm a Cliché"	2011	16	—	—	—	—	—	—	—	—		To Get Her Together
"Save Me"^{[I]}	2011	31	65	—	—	—	—	—	—	—		To Get Her Together
"What Have You Done"^{[J]}	2011	14	67	—	—	—	—	—	—	—		To Get Her Together
"Birds"	2013	3	12	—	22	—	49	—	3	158	NVPI: Platinum	Sad Singalong Songs
"Pretending As Always"	2013	57	—	—	—	—	—	—	—	—		Sad Singalong Songs
"Wigger"	2013	17	80	—	—	—	—	—	—	—		Paradise and Back Again
"You and I"	2014	28	57	—	—	—	—	—	—	—		Paradise and Back Again
"Places to Go"	2014	16	52	—	—	—	—	—	—	—		Paradise and Back Again
"Hold Me" (with Douwe Bob)	2015	10	—	—	—	—	—	—	—	—		Paradise and Back Again
"New Day"	2015	23	—	—	—	—	—	—	—	—	NVPI: Gold	Greatest Hits
"Dominique"	2015	16	29	—	—	—	—	—	—	—		Greatest Hits
"Run Away Together"	2016	24	—	—	—	—	—	—	—	—		Queen for a Day
"Wanna Little Something"	2016	62	—	—	—	—	—	—	—	—		Queen for a Day
"Burn"	2016	—	—	—	—	—	—	—	—	—		Fake It Till We Die
"I Just Met a Man"	2016	58	—	—	—	—	—	—	—	—		Fake It Till We Die
"No Love" (with Kampi)	2018	—	—	—	—	—	—	—	—	—		Non-album single
"Lente"	2018	—	—	—	—	—	—	—	—	—		Wen d'r maar aan
"Het is klaar"	2018	—	—	—	—	—	—	—	—	—		Wen d'r maar aan
"Jij"	2018	—	89	—	—	—	—	—	—	—		Wen d'r maar aan
"Million Dollar"	2019	34	—	—	—	—	—	—	—	—		Non-album single
"It's a New Day"	2019	—	—	—	—	—	—	—	—	—		Non-album single
"I Love You"	2020	—	—	—	—	—	—	—	—	—		Non-album single
"Something Better"	2022	—	—	—	—	—	—	—	—	—		Trails of Fails
"Met jou kan ik het aan"	2023	—	—	—	—	—	—	—	—	—		Non-album single
"One Day at a Time"	2023	—	—	—	—	—	—	—	—	—		Deena & Jim
"Voor je 't weet" (with Tino Martin)	2024	15	—	—	—	—	—	—	—	—		Non-album single
"—" denotes items which were not released in that country or failed to chart.

=== As featured artist ===
List of singles, with selected chart positions, showing year released and album name
Title	Year	Peak chart positions		Album
Title	Year	NL	BEL (FL)	Album
"Between These Walls" (Junkie XL featuring Anouk)	2003	35	—	Radio JXL: A Broadcast From the Computer Hell Cabin
"Downhill"^{[K]} (Postman featuring Anouk)	2006	17	11	Green
"Feet on the Ground" (Nicky Romero and Anouk)	2014	48	—	Non-album single
"—" denotes items which were not released in that country or failed to chart.

=== Promotional singles ===
List of singles, with selected chart positions, showing year released and album name
Title	Year	Peak chart positions		Album
Title	Year	NL	BEL (FL)	Album
"Break Down the Wall"	2001	—	—	Lost Tracks
"Margarita Chum"	2004	—	—	Graduated Fool
"Only You"	2004	—	—	Anouk Is Alive
"More Than You Deserve"	2006	—	—	Anouk Is Alive
"Today"^{[L]}	2009	50	—	For Bitter or Worse
"Killer Bee"	2011	21	39	To Get Her Together
"Kill"	2013	—	—	Sad Singalong Songs
"The Good Life"	2013	—	—	Sad Singalong Songs
"Don't Wipe Us Out"	2014	—	78	Paradise and Back Again
"Dirty Girl"	2016	—	—	Queen for a Day
"Down Daddy Down"	2016	—	—	Fake It Till We Die
"Million Dollar"	2019	—	—	Non-album singles
"Its a New Day"	2019	17	—	Non-album singles
"—" denotes items which were not released in that country or failed to chart.

== Video albums ==
- 2001 - Lost Tracks [DVD+CD]
- 2002 - The Music Videos
- 2004 - Close-up
- 2006 - Anouk Is Alive (April 28, 2006)
- 2008 - Live at Gelredome

== Notes ==
- A "Mood Indigo" did not enter the Dutch Top 40, but peaked at number six on the Dutch Tipparade chart, which acts as a 30-song extension to the Top 40.
- B "Don't" did not enter the Ultratop 50, but peaked at number thirteen on the Flemish Ultratip, which acts as an extension to the Ultratop 50.
- C "Love" did not enter the Dutch Top 40, but peaked at number two on the Dutch Tipparade chart, which acts as a 30-song extension to the Top 40.
- D "Everything" did not enter the Ultratop 50, but peaked at number thirteen on the Flemish Ultratip, which acts as an extension to the Ultratop 50.
- E "I Live for You" did not enter the Dutch Top 40, but peaked at number four on the Dutch Tipparade chart, which acts as a 30-song extension to the Top 40.
- F "I Don't Wanna Hurt" did not enter the Ultratop 50, but peaked at number one on the Flemish Ultratip, which acts as an extension to the Ultratop 50.
- G "Lovedrunk" did not enter the Dutch Top 40, but peaked at number three on the Dutch Tipparade chart, which acts as a 30-song extension to the Top 40.
- H "Down & Dirty" did not enter the Ultratop 50, but peaked at number twenty on the Flemish Ultratip, which acts as an extension to the Ultratop 50.
- I "Save Me" did not enter the Ultratop 50, but peaked at number fifteen on the Flemish Ultratip, which acts as an extension to the Ultratop 50.
- J "What Have You Done" did not enter the Ultratop 50, but peaked at number seventeen on the Flemish Ultratip, which acts as an extension to the Ultratop 50.
- K "Downhill" did not enter the Ultratop 50, but peaked at number eleven on the Flemish Ultratip, which acts as an extension to the Ultratop 50.
- L "Today" did not enter the Dutch Top 40, but peaked at number ten on the Dutch Tipparade, which acts as a 30-song extension to the Top 40.
