= Lost Tracks (Anouk album) =

Compilation album by Anouk
- Released: 1 January 2001
- Genre: Pop rock, alternative rock, post-grunge
- Label: Dino Music 7243 5 32602 2 4

Anouk chronology
| Urban Solitude (1999) | Lost Tracks (2001) | Graduated Fool (2002) |

Lost Tracks is a compilation album by the artist Anouk released in 2001. It contains a few previously unreleased tracks, as well as duets with other artists or tracks that had been performed live, rather than in a studio.

== Reception ==
The album reached #1 position in the Dutch charts, and was certified Gold for selling over 35,000 copies.

== Track listing ==
1. Break Down the Wall (Original Version)
2. Love (Acoustic Version for Radio 3FM)
3. Don't (Remix)
4. Sacrifice (String Version)
5. Home Is in My Head
6. Redemption (Duet with the Anonymous Mis)
7. I Alone (Duet with Sarah Bettens / K's Choice – 2 Meter Sessie)
8. Nobody's Wife (Reggae Version – 2 Meter Sessie)
9. Lovin' Whiskey (Live)
10. Last Time
11. It's So Hard (2 Meter Sessie)
12. Break Down the Wall (Acoustic Version for Veronica FM)
13. Don't (Acoustic Version)
14. In the Sand
15. R. U. Kiddin' Me

== Credits ==
- Bass – Michel van Schie (tracks: 1, 3, 7, 8, 10 to 13)
- Drums – Satindra Kalpoe (tracks: 3, 5, 8, 10, 11)
- Guitar – Paul Jan Bakker (tracks: 1, 3, 7, 8, 10 to 13), Roland Dirkse (tracks: 1, 3, 7, 8, 11 to 13)
- Photography – Jos Voncken, Rob Becker
- Written-By – A. Teeuwe* (tracks: 1 to 3, 6, 8, 10 to 15), B. van Veen* (tracks: 2, 3, 6, 8, 10, 11, 13 to 15)

== Charts ==
=== Weekly charts ===
| Chart (2001) | Peak position |
|---|---|
| Belgian Albums (Ultratop Flanders) | 5 |
| Dutch Albums (Album Top 100) | 1 |

=== Year-end charts ===
| Chart (2001) | Position |
|---|---|
| Belgian Albums (Ultratop Flanders) | 60 |
| Dutch Albums (Album Top 100) | 14 |
