= Wigger (song) =

2013 song by Anouk

Single by Anouk

from the album Paradise and Back Again
- Released: 13 September 2013
- Length: 3:28
- Label: Goldilox, Universal Music Group
- Songwriters: Anouk, Tore Johansson
- Producer: Instead of Production

Anouk singles chronology
"Pretending as Always" (2013)	"Wigger" (2013)	"You & I" (2014)

"Wigger" is a song by Dutch musician Anouk. It was released on 13 September 2013 as the lead single from her ninth studio album, Paradise and Back Again.

The song is titled after a portmanteau of the racial classification "white" and the racial slur "nigger", with the titular phrase often used to label a white person who emulates Black culture.

== Background ==
The song was released a few months after Anouk finished ninth at the Eurovision Song Contest 2013 with the song "Birds". "Wigger" was immediately picked up by Dutch radio stations including Radio 538 and NPO 3FM. At the time, her husband was Remon Stotijn, a Surinamese-born Dutch singer who fathered three of her four children. In the song, the lyrics refer to "my kids' brown sugared skin." The song was immediately controversial, with a Dutch blogger releasing a YouTube video declaring that well-intentioned or not, it's still a racist word.

In response to the criticism, Anouk wrote a message on Facebook where she gave the Wikipedia definition of the title and concluded, "We do after all live in a world where we are inspired regardless of skin colour or gender! So I’ve come to the conclusion it’s all bullshit. I am what I am. A true blond, proud wigger & honestly it suits me better (than) anyone else, doesn’t it?" She also did a further interview with 3FM DJ Giel Beelen where she said that Justin Bieber and Miley Cyrus were other individuals who submerge themselves in black music and culture.

== Personnel ==
- Anouk – vocals
- Tore Johansson – guitar, bass
- Petter Lindgård – drums
- Martin Gjerstad – keyboards

== Charts ==
Weekly chart performance for "Wigger"
Chart (2013)	Peak position
Netherlands (Dutch Top 40)	17
Netherlands (Single Top 100)	16

Year-end chart performance for "Wigger"
Chart (2013)	Position
Netherlands (Dutch Top 40)	98
