= Opgezwolle =

Dutch rap group

- Origin: Zwolle, Netherlands
- Genres: Hip hop
- Years active: 2001–2007
- Labels: Top Notch
- Past members: Sticky Steez; Phreako Rico; Delic

Opgezwolle (Dutch pronunciation: [ˈɔpxəˌzʋɔlə]) was a Dutch rap group consisting of MCs Sticky Steez and Phreako Rico, and beatmaker DJ Dippy Delic.

== Biography ==
In 2001 Opgezwolle competed in a contest called "De Oogst van Overijssel". After winning the final in Enschede in May 2001 they got a place in the regional final of the GPNL, and in the summer they recorded their first album Spuugdingen op de Mic.

Opgezwolle made it to the final of the GPNL where they competed with Raymzter. The jury thought that Raymzter made a better impression and he won the contest. DJ Delic got a prize as "Musician of the Evening". On the evening before the GPNL final, they presented Spuugdingen op de Mic in Hedon, Zwolle. The album received overall positive reviews from critics.

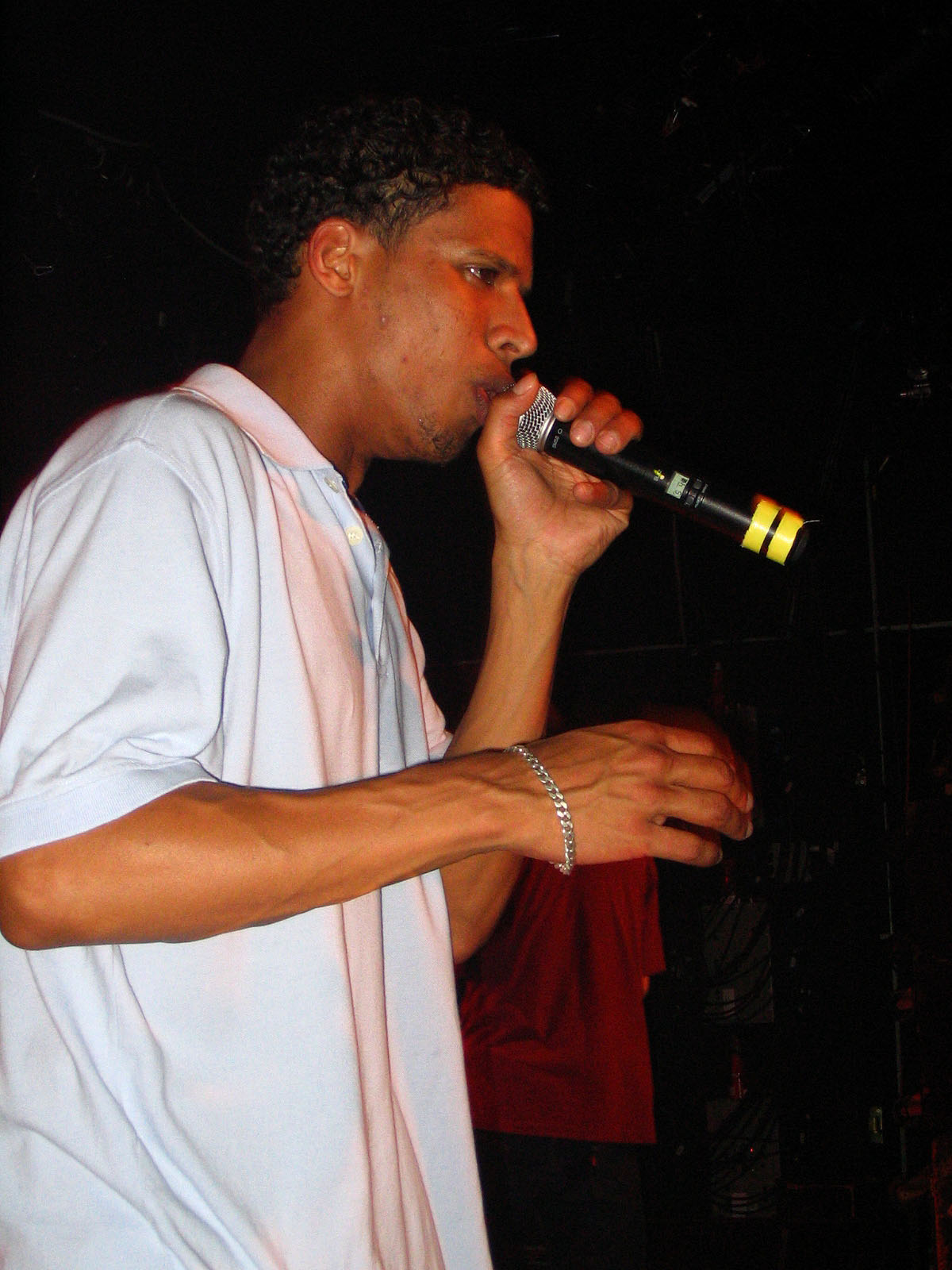
Opgezwolle at Vera, Groningen in 2006

In 2002 Opgezwolle began their "Homegrown" Tour. They caught the eye of Dutch label TopNotch and in mid-2002 a record deal was signed for three albums.

On 5 December 2002 they released Opgeduveld, a collaboration between Opgezwolle and the Rotterdam rap group DuvelDuvel (whose members are Duvel, Rein de Vos and Supahdupah). This CD was also well received. In 2005 it was rereleased in both standard and collectors editions.

In 2003, Opgezwolle released Vloeistof/Brandstof, a double-CD, with the second CD being an empty recordable CD. The songs of Brandstof were downloadable from Opgezwolle's website. After performing at many festivals such as Lowlands and the Liberation Day Festival, the initiation of the FC Zwolle Stadion, Planet Rock and the TopNotch Tour, they needed something new and they went back in the recording studio to work with other Dutch MCs like Raymzter, C-mon, Usual Suspects, Duvel, Rein, Pollum, Blabla, Blaxtar, Typhoon and beatmaker Kubus.

On 29 November 2004 the most recent CD of Sticks and Kubus hit the stores, named Microphone Colossus. Sticks named the CD after 'Saxophone Colossus', an album by Sonny Rollins.

The Buitenwesten Tour with Typhoon, Jawat, Kubus and Duvel went all through the Netherlands and was a great success, with many sold out halls.

After a long period of silence from the band, on 23 January 2006 the third Opgezwolle album Eigen Wereld was released. The album features collaborations with other MCs like Pinda, Jawat!, Duvel, Winne en Raymzter. The album contains 21 songs, and almost 70 minutes of music. It reached to number four in the 'Album Top 100', the highest ever chart position of any Dutch rap album. Their tour for this album also received good reviews.

== Discography ==
Spuugdingen op de Mic (2001)

1. Mafkezen
2. Bob Sticky
3. Verwend
4. Opgezwolle de Volle
5. Ritmen
6. Als die Mic Aanstaat (ft. Typhoon)
7. Voor die Peeps (ft. Blaxtar)
8. XI (ft. Karlijn)
9. Zwolle
10. Spuugdingen op die Mic
11. 't Duurde Even
12. Kruidig en Pittig (ft. BlaBla)

Vloeistof (2003)

1. Sporen
2. Stop
3. De Tijd Leert
4. Tempel
5. Verre Oosten (Single)
6. Vraag & Antwoord (ft. BlaBla)
7. Dit is...
8. Tjappies & Mammies (Single)
9. Dip Saus
10. Hook Up (ft. Blaxtar & Typhoon)
11. Rustug
12. Vork
13. Concept of Niet
14. Beestenboel
15. Haters en Stokers

Brandstof (2003)

1. Hardcore Raps
2. Je Weet 't
3. Doe je wat je Doet (ft. Kubus)
4. Klap
5. Skeit
6. Waarheid van 't Uur
7. Praten (ft. Duvel)

Eigen Wereld (2006)

All tracks were produced by Dj Delic

1. Hoedenplank (single)
2. Werk aan de Winkel
3. Balans (ft. Josje & Shyrock)
4. Gekkenhuis (ft. Jawat)
5. Nagemaakt
6. Eigen Wereld
7. Elektrostress
8. Passievrucht/Bosmuis (ft. Duvel)
9. Made in NL
10. NL Door
11. Gebleven
12. Ut Is Wat Het Is (ft. Raymzter)
13. Volle Kracht (ft. Winne)
14. Gerrit
15. Ukkie
16. Vroeger/Nu (ft. James)
17. Regendans
18. Open Ogen
19. Tunnelvisie
20. De Jug
21. Park (ft. Bert Vrielink)

== Collaborations ==
"Het Kapitalisme" - U-niq (2008)

- Politiek ft. Shyrock

Rayacties - Raymzter (2005)

- Levenslessen

Smookbreeks - Raymzter (2003)

- Smookbreek
- Altijd Laat
- Waar Wou je Heen Gaan
- Verre Oosten
- Skeit (Remix)
- Vloeistof (Remix)

Buitenwesten - Kubus (2004)

- Zwolsche Boys ft. BlaBla
- Strik je Veter
- D-d-d-dikke Gek ft. Jawat
- Buitenbad
- Hamvraag
- Je Kan niet Komen
- Braz-ill

Microphone Colossus - Kubus & Sticks (2004)

- Intro
- Fakkeldrager
- Creatief Proces
- Stickertcampagne
- Hamvraag
- Flows, Fases, Shows, Situaties
- Nix te Verliezen
- Microphone Colossus
- Pottenbrekers
- Zoute Haring
- Biri & Jonko
- Vragen

Ut Zwarte Aap - Jawat (2005)

- Zwarte Koffie
- De Waarheid
- Batterij ft. Kubus

Patta Mixtape - Patta (2005)

- Patta Exclusief 1 ft. Jawat
- Patta Exclusief 4 ft. JJ & Shaa

Opgeduveld - DuvelDuvel (2005)

- Intro
- 1001 Sprookjes
- Te Warm
- Dikke Rapper
- Generaal
- Vier Keer Vier
- Zakelijk
- Ze gaan 't Krijgen
- Zonder Handen

Van Aap naar Primaat - DuvelDuvel (2002)

- Pimp Rappers

2e Jeugd - Extince (2004)

- Zure Overval ft. DuvelDuvel, Klopdokter, Raymzter & Kiddo Cee

Cereal - C-Mon (2004)

- Schaapies Tellen

Homegrown 2002 (2002)

- Hersenspinsels
- Netwerk ft. Kubus

Homegrown 2005 (2005)

- Zwarte Koffie ft. Jawat
- Volle Vrijheid ft. Kubus

Alle 18 Dope (2002)

- Netwerk

Vet Verse Flows (2003)

- Het Doek Valt ft. Typhoon

== Other work ==
(not published on an album)

- Dodelijke Collabo ft. DRT
- Haat/Dat Ding Dat ik Doe
- Gestolen Flow
- Veel te Ver (Jakarta project track Pakabar)
- Hallo
- A.B.C. ft. Kubus
- Halfbloed ft. Kubus
- Vakman ft. Kubus
- Stickstof ft. Kubus
- Volle Vrijheid ft. Kubus
- Een Beetje Vertieft ft. Raymzter & Kubus
- Pittige Toegift ft. Typhoon
- Laat Het een Les Zijn ft. loic
- Biet 4 Brian

== Info From ==
- nl:Opgezwolle
