= Svemir =

Svemir is a South Slavic given name. Notable people with the name include:

- Svemir Delić (1929–2017), Croatian and Yugoslav footballer
- Svemir Đorđić (born 1948), Yugoslav former footballer
