= Rajae El Mouhandiz =

Dutch-Moroccan-Algerian singer and poet (born 1979)

Rajae El Mouhandiz رجاء المهندس
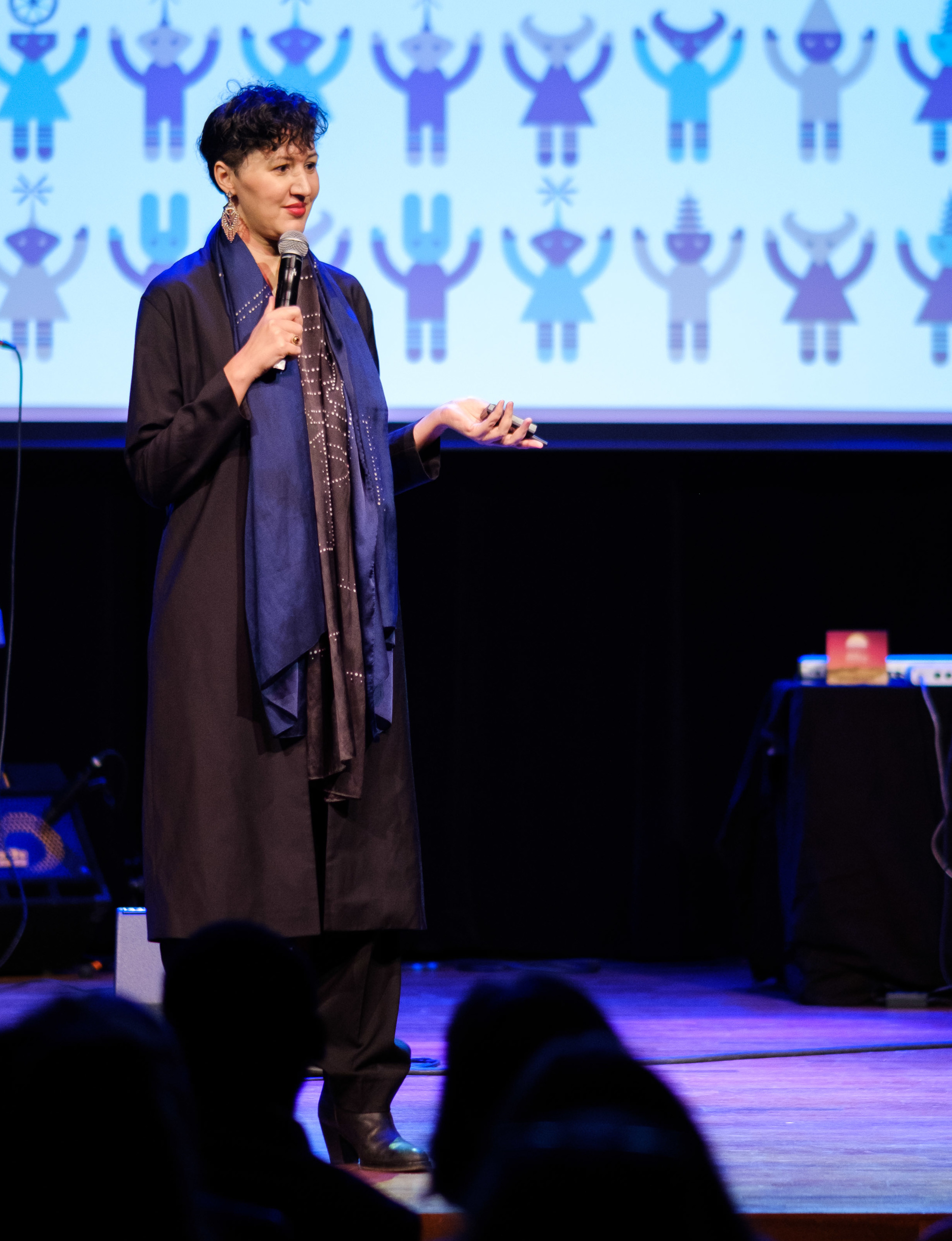
- Rajae El Mouhandiz in Ontwikkeling

Background information
- Also known as: Rajae
- Born: 25 March 1979 (age 47); Larache, Morocco
- Genres: Maghreb Soul, jazz, pop
- Occupations: Singer, composer, poet, performer, creative director
- Years active: 1995–present
- Label: Kahina Productions 2005–present
- Website: http://www.rajae.net

Rajae El Mouhandiz (Arabic: رجاء المهندس, born 25 March 1979), better known mononymously as Rajae (Arabic: رجاء) is a Dutch-Moroccan/Algerian poet, singer, storyteller and composer.

== Early life ==
Rajae El Mouhandiz was born in Larache, Morocco, to an Algerian mother and a Moroccan father, Habiba Cherkaoui and Ahmed El Mouhandiz. Her parents moved to Amsterdam when she was a baby. After her parents' separation in 1982, El Mouhandiz spent her childhood with her mother and siblings in Amsterdam.

== Career ==
While in primary school and high school, El Mouhandiz attended extensive ballet classes and studied the French horn. At the age of sixteen she was the first North-African to study at a Dutch conservatory where she continued her classical music studies. At the age of 20, El Mouhandiz left classical music to follow her own artistic path, seeking to incorporate her cultural roots.

On International Women's Day 2012, El Mouhandiz premiered her first short doc film, a short film about the acceptance of Muslim women in mainstream media and the music industry.

El Mouhandiz is also one of the 60 female curators of the international MUSLIMA exhibition.

From 2009 to 2018, El Mouhandiz was nominated on the list of the 500 most influential Muslims in the world for her work in the field of culture & art.

On 31 October 2013, El Mouhandiz gave her first TEDx talk during TEDx Breda. In her talk she spoke about how art and music create a new hybrid global culture. She still continues to sing and publish music of her own.

== Discography ==
=== Albums ===
- 2006: Incarnation
- 2009: Hand Of Fatima
- 2013: single - Gracefully
- 2015: EP- "Watani"

=== Compilations and features ===
- 2003 Hind – Summer all over again
- 2005 EMI/Funda – Fundamentally Dinner Time
- 2006 Licksamba Music – Licksamba
- 2006 Difference Portugal – Brazilounge – Vol. 4
- 2007 Water Music Records Costa Del Sur – Excursions In Laid Back Chill
- 2007 Amir Sulaiman/Dj BLM/Anas Canon – Broad Daylight
- 2007 Dj BLM/Anas Canon – Songs In The Key Of Iman
- 2007 Chris Hinze/Dalai Lama – Tibet Impressions vol.3
- 2007 Van Meeteren & Hyde – Love Peace & Terror
- 2007 Raymzter/Rick D./Amnesty International – Maak Lawaai
- 2009 Raymzter/Jiggy Djé – De Frontlinie
- 2010 Water Music Records – Cocktail Essentials
- 2011 Melkkleuren – Milk for Today
- 2013 Water Music Records - Hotel Chill 6

=== Music videos ===
- 2007 Raymzter/Rick D./Amnesty International – Maak Lawaai
- 2007 Dadara, Van Meeteren & Hyde – Love Peace & Terror
- 2010 Rajae – Malcolm Lateef Shabazz
- 2011 Melkkleuren – Milk for Today
- 2013 Rajae - Gracefully

=== Music theatre, exhibition, film and acting ===
- 2007 Dutch Theatre Tour and recordings in Ibiza for "Serieuzere Zaken' with Raymzter and Chris Hinze.
- 2007 "Conversations With Ice" by Sahr Ngaujah – Over 't IJ 2007. The question of Value (Who decides Who buys), within the context of the global diamond trade, Sierra Leone’s child soldiers, and its links to the Bling sub-culture in Hip-Hop.
- 2008 Cameo appearance in a TV series "Flow" on Dutch broadcaster NPS
- 2013 Co-written, co-produced and acted in her first Short documentary film ¡HOPE!
- 2013 Curator and artist in the international MUSLIMA Exhibition
- 2013 TEDx talk; How art and music create a new hybrid global culture.
- 2014 KRO, Recht uit het Hart
- 2012 Hijabi Monologen NL
- 2017 Music theatre production: Thuis, Ontheemd #1
- 2018 Music theatre production: Thuis, Ontheemd #2
