= Who's Your Momma =

Studio album by Anouk
- Released: 23 November 2007; June 2008 Norway
- Recorded: 2007
- Genre: Rock, pop
- Length: 38:44
- Label: Dino/EMI
- Producer: Glen Ballard

Anouk chronology
Anouk Is Alive (2006)	Who's Your Momma (2007)	For Bitter or Worse (2009)

Singles from Who's Your Momma
- 1. "Good God" Released: 2 November 2007; 2. "I Don't Wanna Hurt" Released: 19 January 2008; 3. "Modern World" Released: 12 May 2008; 4. "If I Go" Released: 1 September 2008

Who's Your Momma is the fifth studio album by Dutch pop rock singer Anouk. It was released on 23 November 2007 in the Netherlands and Belgium. It is her first studio album of new material since Hotel New York in December 2004. Who's Your Momma debuted at number one in the Netherlands, making it her fifth number one album and fourth debut at the top. The album contains the soul-influenced rock first single "Good God".

In May 2008, the single "Lost" from her previous studio album Hotel New York reached the number 2 position in Norway. Therefore, EMI decided to release the album in Norway in June 2008 and add "Lost" to the track listing. The video for "Modern World" was directed by Melina Matsoukas.

== Track listing ==
1. "If I Go" – 4:24 (Anouk Teeuwe, Bart van Veen, Leendert Haaksma)
2. "Might as Well" – 3:10 (Anouk Teeuwe, Martijn van Agt, Hans Eijkenaar, Haaksma, Michel van Schie, Teeuwe)
3. "Make It Rain" – 4:02 (Teeuwe, Glen Ballard)
4. "Modern World" – 3:30 (Anouk Teeuwe, Bart van Veen)
5. "I Don't Wanna Hurt" – 3:33 (Anouk Teeuwe, Dan Hill)
6. "Good God" – 2:36 (Anouk Teeuwe, R.R. Stotijn)
7. "The Difference" – 3:05 (Anouk Teeuwe, Bart van Veen)
8. "Whatever You Say" – 3:15 (Stotijn, Teeuwe)
9. "Ball and Chain" – 3:31 (Anouk Teeuwe, Glen Ballard)
10. "Daze" – 3:37 (Anouk Teeuwe)
11. "If You Were Mine" – 4:07 (Stotijn, Teeuwe)
12. "Lost" (Only in Norway) – 3:42

== Controversy ==
In May 2008, influential Dutch radio DJ Giel Beelen played an unofficial song from Anouk, "With You", on his radio show. He downloaded the song from a fansite of the singer. Anouk's record company EMI Music was not supportive and ordered Beelen to stop playing it. The song was used as a potential first single in Canada a few years ago, but was never released physically. Beelen didn't listen and played the song again. And with success: in September 2008 the song was released as a double a-side with the fourth and final single from the album, "If I Go".

== Charts, certifications and sales ==
The album debuted at number one in the Netherlands. After only a week and a half, the album became certified platinum. In Belgium (Flanders), the album debuted lower, at number 20, and moved up to number 7 the next week, receiving a gold certification in that week.

Chart (2007)	Peak position	Certification	Sales
Belgian UltraTop Albums Chart (Flanders)	4	Platinum	50,000
European Top 100 Albums	82		
Netherlands Mega Album Chart	1	2× Platinum	200,000
