= Eigen =

Eigen may refer to:

== People with the given name ==
- Eigen Hayashi (林 英源, born 1949), Japanese sport shooter
- Haruka Eigen (永源 遙, 1946-2016), Japanese professional wrestler
- Frauke Eigen (born 1969) German photographer, photojournalist and artist
- Manfred Eigen (1927–2019), German biophysicist
- Michael Eigen (born 1936) American psychologist and psychoanalyst
- Karl Eigen (1927–2016) German farmer and politician
- Saint Eigen, female Christian saint
- Peter Eigen, (born 1938) German lawyer, development economist and civil society leader

== Places ==
- Eigen, Schwyz, settlement in the municipality of Alpthal in the canton of Schwyz, Switzerland
- Eigen, Thurgau, locality in the municipality of Lengwil in the canton of Thurgau, Switzerland
- Eigen-ji, Buddhist temple

== Others ==
- Eigen (C++ library), computer programming library for matrix and linear algebra operations
- Eigen Wereld, is Opgezwolle's third album
- Eigen Kweek, was a 2013-2019 Belgian crime comedy television series

== See also ==
- Eigenvalue, eigenvector and eigenspace in mathematics and physics
- Eigenclass, synonym to metaclass in the Ruby programming language
- Eigenbehaviour, with its connection to eigenform and eigenvalue in cybernetics
- Eigenfunction, is any non-zero function $f$
