= Live at Symphonica in Rosso =

Live album by Anouk
- Released: March 14, 2014
- Recorded: December 16 and 19, 2013, Ziggo Dome, Amsterdam
- Genres: Pop/rock, symphony
- Length: 1:51:11
- Label: Goldilox Music

Anouk chronology
Sad Singalong Songs (2013)	Live at Symphonica in Rosso (2014)	Paradise and Back Again (2014)

Live at Symphonica in Rosso is the third live album by Dutch singer Anouk. The album was released on March 14, 2014 via Anouk's own label, Goldilox Music.

== Background ==
This live album was recorded during the Symphonica in Rosso-concerts on December 16 and 19, 2013, in the Ziggo Dome, Amsterdam. Anouk performed her songs in special arrangements with Guido's Orchestra. It is the first time that Anouk gave concerts with an orchestra.

With this album, Anouk was #1 in the Dutch Album Top 100 for the tenth time.

== Track list ==
1	The Rules	3:41
2	The Good Life	3:40
3	Are You Lonely	3:34
4	Kill	4:22
5	Birds	4:51
6	Down & Dirty	4:24
7	Woman	4:39
8	Modern World	11:53
9	I Won't Play That Game	5:28
10	One Word	5:28
11	I'm A Cliché	4:29
12	For Bitter Or Worse	6:45
13	Pretending As Always	3:36
14	Three Days in a Row	4:20
15	If I Go	4:23
16	Girl	5:28
17	Michel	6:22
18	Nothing at All (with Trijntje Oosterhuis)	4:17
19	Wigger	3:37
20	Lost	5:26
21	Killer Bee	3:16
22	Nobody's Wife	7:00

=== Album : song ===
- Together Alone (1997): Nobody's Wife
- Urban Solitude (1999): Michel
- Hotel New York (2004): One Word, Girl, Lost
- Who's Your Momma (2007): Modern World, If I Go
- For Bitter Or Worse (2009): Woman, For Bitter Or Worse, Three Days in a Row
- To Get Her Together (2011): Down & Dirty, I'm A Cliché, Killer Bee
- Sad Singalong Songs (2013): The Rules, The Good Life, Are You Lonely, Kill, Birds, Pretending As Always
- Not yet released: I Won't Play That Game, Wigger
- Wrecks We Adore by Trijntje Oosterhuis: Nothing At All

== Chart performance ==
=== Weekly charts ===
Chart (2014)	Peak position
Belgian Albums (Ultratop Flanders)	18
Belgian Albums (Ultratop Wallonia)	92
Dutch Albums (Album Top 100)	1

=== Year-end charts ===
Chart (2014)	Position
Dutch Albums (Album Top 100)	64

== Personnel ==
=== Band ===
- Guitar: Martijn van Agt, Arie Storm
- Bass: Glenn Gaddum
- Keyboards: Ronald Kool
- Drums: Martijn Vink
- Backing vocals: Shirma Rouse, Ricardo Burgrust, Yerry Rellum
- Guest artist: Trijntje Oosterhuis

=== Guido's Orchestra ===
- Conductor: Guido Dieteren
- Arranger: Martin Gjerstad
- Violin: Marleen Matser CM, Karolina Andrzejczak, Lieke Arts, Kim de Beer, Mariam Buzghulashvili, Asia Czaj, Anne van Eck, Sophie Gabriels, Ewelina Krysiak, Marta Lemanska, Annelieke Marselje, Kristina Rimkeviciute, Julia Rusanovsky, Stefaan de Rycke, Rebecca Smit, Aleksandra Stadniczenko, Marcus Vliegen
- Viola: Anna Dushkina, Nadine Hilkens, Emerentia Knebel, Paloma Ortas, Mara Tieles, Joanne Wigmans, Kirsten de Witte
- Cello: Veronique Franssen, Judith Groen, Dewy Kersten, Nele Stuyk, Renée Wijnhoven
- Double bass: Rob Zuguers
- Woodwinds: Leentje Clijsters, Werner Janssen, Inge Peters, Wenny Roeffen, Kees Rongen, Dorien Schrooten, Greg Torunski
- Brass instruments: Nick Caris, Jos van den Heuvel, Luc van den Hove, Alex Loiacono, Jürgen Martl, David Mast, Guido Rooyakkers, Cleo Simons, Lars Wachelder, Nando van Westrienen
- Harp: Bob Heuvelmans
- Synthesizer: Falco Borsboom, Ron Cuijpers
- Percussion: Patrick Eijdems, Bas Lindelauf, Ruud Peeters
- Orchestra production: GD Music BV, Henny Dieteren-Franssen, Myrthe Pörteners, Wendy Kokkelkoren

=== Others ===
- Recording: Eurosound, Bram de Groot, Michiel Hoogenboezem, Wout de Kruif
- Mix: John Sonneveld, Tijmen Zinkhaan
- Mastering: Sander van der Heide
- Production: John Mulder, Flip van Ommeren, Mojo Concerts, Kim Bloem, Junior van der Stel, Marjolein Zonneveld
- Artwork: Chris Kühlen
