= Eigen Wereld =

Studio album by Opgezwolle
- Released: 2006
- Genre: Hip hop
- Length: 69:34
- Label: TopNotch
- Producer: Delic

Opgezwolle chronology
Vloeistof (2003)	Eigen Wereld (2006)

Singles from Eigen Wereld
- 1. "Hoedenplank"; 2. "Gekkenhuis"; 3. "Gerrit"

Eigen Wereld is a studio album by Opgezwolle, released in 2006.

== Track listing ==
All tracks feature both Rico & Sticks, except for "Elektrostress" (performed by Rico), "Ukkie" (performed by Rico), "Gerrit" (performed by Sticks), "Vroeger / Nu" (performed by Sticks featuring James) and "De Jug" (instrumental track).

1. "Hoedenplank"
2. "Werk aan de Winkel"
3. "Balans" (featuring Josje & Shyrock)
4. "Gekkenhuis" (featuring Jawat!)
5. "Nagemaakt"
6. "Eigen Wereld"
7. "Elektrostress"
8. "Passievrucht / Bosmuis" (featuring Duvel)
9. "Made in NL"
10. "NL Door"
11. "Gebleven"
12. "Ut is Wat Het is" (featuring Raymzter)
13. "Volle Kracht" (featuring Winne)
14. "Gerrit"
15. "Ukkie"
16. "Vroeger / Nu" (featuring James)
17. "Regendans"
18. "Ogen Open"
19. "Tunnelvisie"
20. "De Jug"
21. "Park" (featuring Bert Vrielink)

== Credits ==
- Peter Blom - Producer
- J. Uiterwijk - Writer
- R. McDougal - Writer
- Reuben Hamburger - Bass guitar on "Balans"
- Onno Wieten - Accordion on "Gekkenhuis"
- Dries Bijlsma - Guitar on "Gekkenhuis", "NL Door" & "Park"
- Reinder van Raalte - Musical saw on "Gekkenhuis"
- Maurits Boreel - Violin on "Eigen Wereld"
- Fred Zomer - Soprano saxophone on "De Jug"
