= If I Go =

If I Go may refer to:

- "If I Go" (Anouk song), 2008
- "If I Go" (Ella Eyre song), 2014
- "If I Go", song by Colin Hay from album Transcendental Highway
