= If I Go (Anouk song) =

Single by Anouk

from the album Who's Your Momma
- Released: 2008
- Label: EMI
- Songwriter(s): Anouk Teeuwe, Leendert Haaksma, Bart van Veen
- Producer(s): Glen Ballard

"If I Go" is a 2008 song by Anouk written by Anouk Teeuwe, Leendert Haaksma, and Bart van Veen.

== Charts ==
The song reached No.15 in the Dutch charts.

=== Weekly charts ===
Chart (2008)	Peak position
Netherlands (Dutch Top 40)	15
Netherlands (Single Top 100)	21

=== Year-end charts ===
Chart (2008)	Position
Netherlands (Dutch Top 40)	77
