= Delić =

Delić (Serbo-Croatian pronunciation: [děliːtɕ]) or Delic (anglicised often to Delich) is a surname popular in former Yugoslavia.

== Bosnians ==
- Amer Delić (born 1982), Bosnian-American tennis player
- Hazim Delić (born 1964), the Deputy Commander of the Čelebići prison camp, sentenced to 18 years for murder and cruelty
- Kada Delić (born 1965), Bosnian race walker
- Rasim Delić (1949–2010), Chief of Staff of the Army of the Republic of Bosnia and Herzegovina
- Rijad Delić (born 1973), Bosnian volleyball player
- Zijad Delic (born 1965), Canadian imam, activist, teacher, executive director of the Canadian Islamic Congress

== Croatian/Serbian/Montenegrin ==
- Adrijana Delić (born 1996), Serbian footballer
- Ahmet Delić (born 1986), Serbian-Austrian footballer
- Božidar Delić (1956–2022), retired general of Army of Yugoslavia, current vice president of Serbian parliament
- Ivan Delić (born 1986), Montenegrin footballer currently playing for FK Buducnost Podgorica
- Ivan Delić (born 1998), Croatian footballer
- Mate Delić (born 1993), Croatian tennis player
- Mateas Delić (born 1988), Croatian football midfielder
- Mladen Delić (1919–2005), Croatian sports commentator
- Nenad Delić (born 1984), Croatian basketball player
- Stipe Delić (1925–1999), Croatian film director
- Svetozar Delić (1885–1967), the first communist mayor of Zagreb, Croatia
- Svemir Delić (1929–2017), Croatian footballer
- Uroš Delić (born 1987), Montenegrin professional football player

== See also ==
- Delitzsch (surname)
