= Hotel New York (Rotterdam) =

Hotel in Rotterdam, Netherlands, in the former office of the Holland America Lines

Coordinates: 51°54′15″N 4°29′03″E

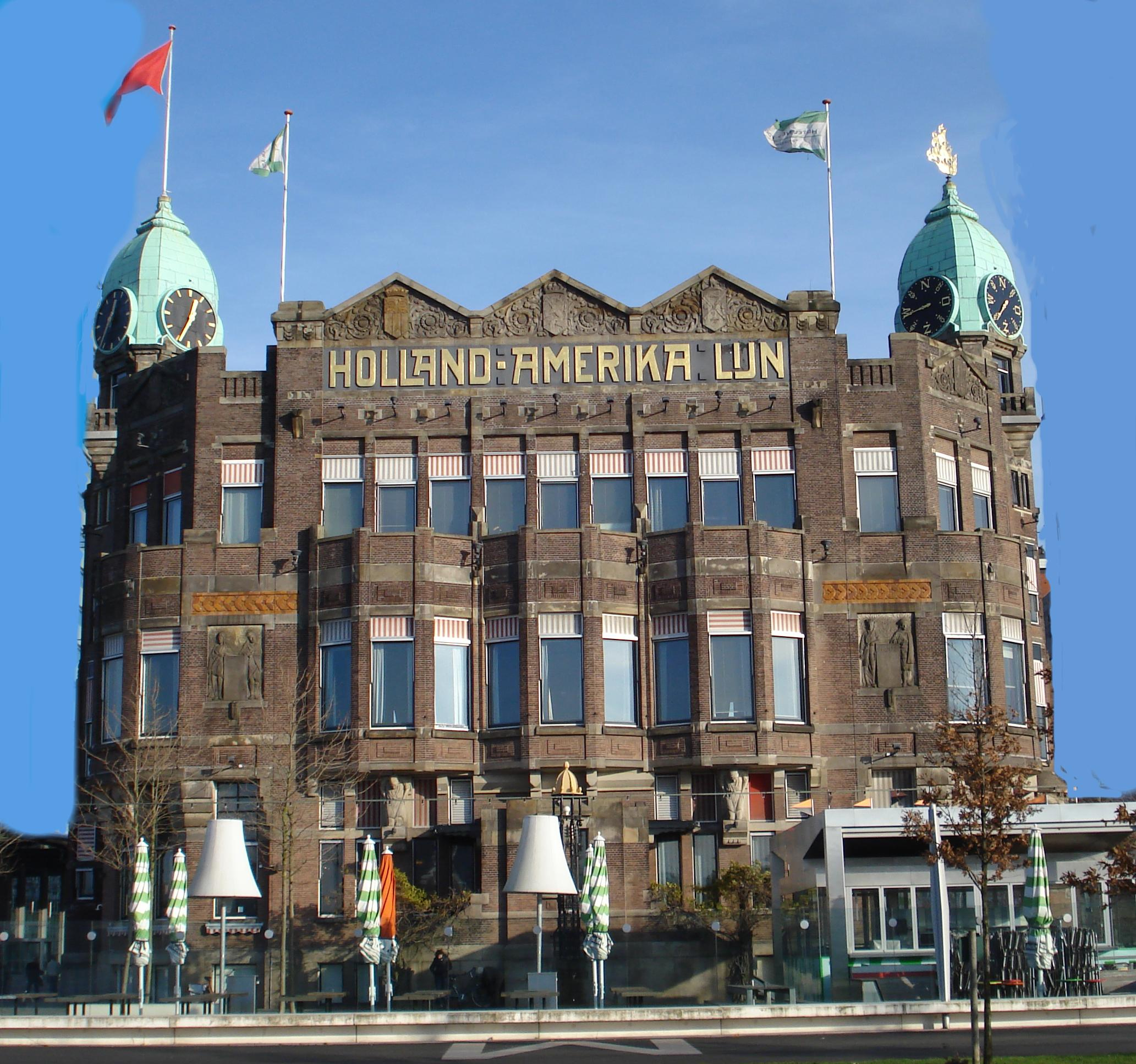
Hotel New York

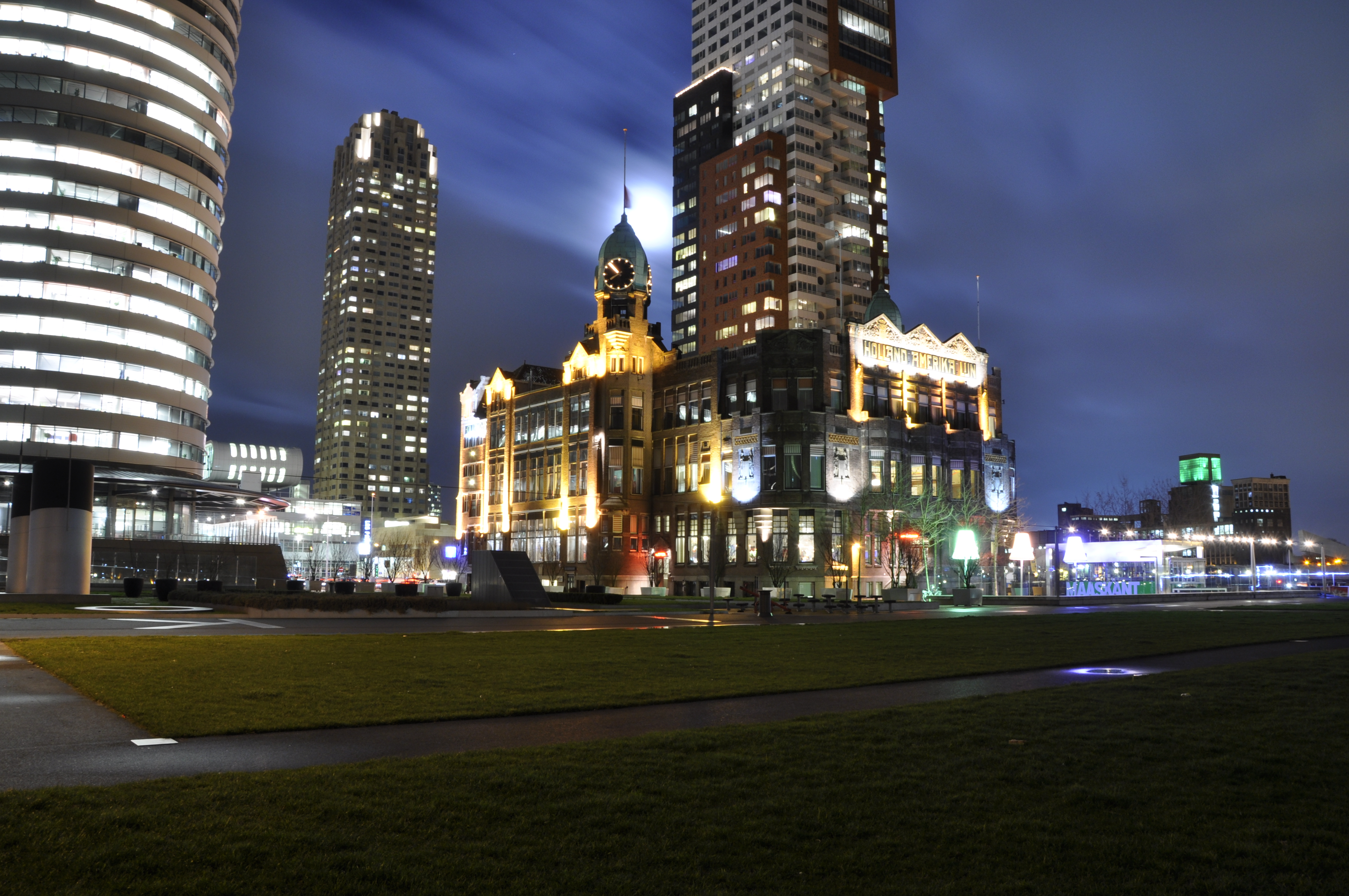
Hotel New York

Hotel New York is a hotel in Rotterdam, the Netherlands, based in the former office building of the Holland America Line (Nederlandsch Amerikaansche Stoomvaart Maatschappij, or NASM). It was used as temporary accommodation for European emigres in the late 19th and early 20th centuries: "Often, package deals were available which would combine a train ticket, hotel accommodation and passage over the oceans."

When sailing from Rotterdam to New York was superseded by flying, the building became derelict in the 1980s. It was squatted in 1988.

The building received renewed interest when entrepreneurs Daan van der Have and Hans Loos, together with designer Dorine de Vos saw the possibility of making a hotel. After several years of rebuilding, the hotel opened in 1993. Since 2006 Hotel New York has been operated by WestCord Hotels, the same company that owns SS Rotterdam, the 1950s flagship of NASM.

Situated in the Kop van Zuid neighbourhood, the building has been a national heritage site since 2000.

The Dutch singer Anouk wrote her album Hotel New York in the hotel.
