= Lost Tracks =

Lost Tracks may refer to:

- Lost Tracks (Anouk album), 2001
- Lost Tracks (Missing Persons album), 2002
- The Lost Tracks of Danzig, 2007
