= Update (Anouk album) =

Live album by Anouk
- Released: January 5, 2004
- Recorded: 2003
- Genre: Pop rock
- Length: 53:53
- Label: EMI
- Producer: Anouk

Anouk chronology
Graduated Fool (2002)	Update (2004)	Hotel New York (2004)

Update is a 2004 live album by the Dutch singer Anouk. It contains acoustic versions of many of her then recent songs, including many tracks from her Graduated Fool album.

== Track listing ==
1. "Who Cares" (Acoustic)
2. "Everything" (Acoustic)
3. "Too Long" (Acoustic)
4. "Searching" (Acoustic)
5. "Stop Thinking" (Acoustic)
6. "Wait and See" (Acoustic)
7. "Margarita Chum" (Acoustic)
8. "It Wasn't Me" (Live at Oosterpoort)
9. "Losing My Religion" (Live at Oosterpoort)
10. "Michel" (Live at Oosterpoort)
11. "Between These Walls" (Acoustic)
12. "Hail" (Live at Denk Aan Henk)
13. "Searching" (Live at Denk Aan Henk)
