= Anouk Is Alive =

Live album by Anouk
- Released: 28 April 2006
- Recorded: 16 & 17 December 2005
- Venue: Ahoy (Rotterdam)
- Genre: Pop rock
- Length: 2:19:37
- Label: EMI

Anouk chronology
Hotel New York (2004)	Anouk Is Alive (2006)	Who's Your Momma (2007)

Anouk Is Alive

Video by Anouk
- Released: 28 April 2006
- Recorded: 16 & 17 December 2005
- Venue: Ahoy (Rotterdam)
- Genre: Pop rock
- Length: 2:19:37
- Label: EMI

Anouk chronology
Close-up (2004)	Anouk Is Alive (2006)	Live At Gelredome (2008)

Professional ratings
Review scores
Source	Rating
MusicMeter.nl	4/5 stars

Anouk Is Alive is a live 2-CD/DVD release by the Dutch pop rock singer Anouk, covering a concert held on 3 and 4 December 2005, at Ahoy, Rotterdam, Netherlands. The DVD went gold in the first week of release.

== Track listing ==
=== CD ===
Disc 1

1. "Love"
2. "Only You"
3. "One Word"
4. "Alright"
5. "More Than You Deserve"
6. "Don't"
7. "R U Kiddin' Me"
8. "Falling Sun"
9. "Sacrifice"
10. "Flower Duet"
11. "Who Cares"
12. "Too Long"
13. "No Time to Waste"
14. "The Dark"
15. "Everything"

Disc 2

1. "Hail"
2. "Searching"
3. "Jerusalem"
4. "I Live for You"
5. "Michel"
6. "Our Own Love"
7. "Graduated Fool"
8. "It's So Hard"
9. "Nobody's Wife"
10. "Home Is in My Head"
11. "Girl"
12. "Lost"

=== DVD ===
Disc 1

1. "Love"
2. "Only You"
3. "One Word"
4. "Alright"
5. "More Than You Deserve"
6. "Don't"
7. "R U Kiddin' Me"
8. "Falling Sun"
9. "Sacrifice"
10. "Flower Duet"
11. "Who Cares"
12. "Too Long"
13. "No Time to Waste"
14. "The Dark"
15. "Everything"
16. "Hail"
17. "Searching"
18. "Jerusalem"
19. "I Live for You"

Disc 2

1. "Michel"
2. "Our Own Love"
3. "Graduated Fool"
4. "It's So Hard"
5. "Nobody's Wife"
6. "Home Is in My Head"
7. "Girl"
8. "Lost"

Special Edition

1. Backstage Documentary
2. "Girl" [Music Video]
3. "Lost" [Music Video]
4. "Jerusalem" [Music Video]
5. "One Word" [Music Video]

== Charts ==
Chart (2006)	Peak position	Certification	Shipments
CD
Belgian UltraTop 50 Albums	5		
Dutch Mega Album Top 100	8	Gold	35,000
DVD
Belgian UltraTop 10 DVDs	1		
Dutch Mega DVD Top 30	1	Gold	50,000
