= Good God (Anouk song) =

Single by Anouk

from the album Who's Your Momma
- Released: 2 November 2007
- Recorded: 2007
- Genre: Soul, rock
- Length: 2:36
- Label: EMI
- Songwriters: Anouk Teeuwe, Remon Stotijn
- Producer: Glen Ballard

Anouk singles chronology
"One Word" (2005)	"Good God" (2007)	"I Don't Wanna Hurt" (2008)

"Good God" is a soul/rock song written by Dutch singer Anouk Teeuwe and her then-husband Remon Stotijn and recorded by Anouk. Produced by its writers along with Glen Ballard, the song was released as the first single from Anouk's album Who's Your Momma on 2 November 2007. The song is a playable track in Guitar Hero World Tour.

The music video of "Good God" was recorded in London and directed by Jonas Åkerlund. The video premiered on November 6, 2007, on the news website NU.nl.

== Trivia ==
The song is used in the intro sequence of the Dutch TV show Kanniewaarzijn.

== Charts ==
=== Weekly charts ===
Chart (2007)	Peak position
Belgium (Ultratop 50 Flanders)	13
Netherlands (Dutch Top 40)	7
Netherlands (Single Top 100)	3

=== Year-end charts ===
Chart (2007)	Position
Netherlands (Dutch Top 40)	74
Netherlands (Single Top 100)	82
