= Mladen Delić =

Croatian sports commentator

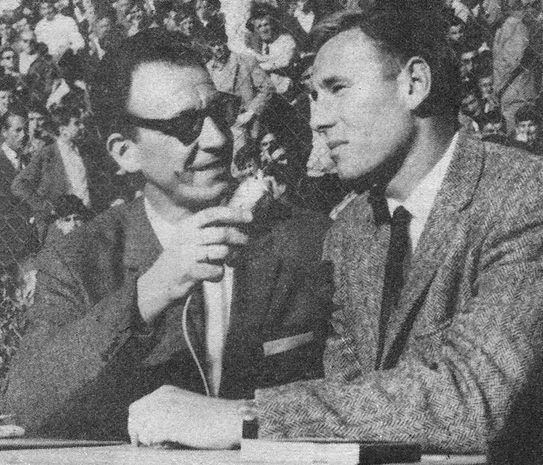
- Mladen Delić (left) and Nikola Pilić
- Born: 15 January 1919; Sinj, Kingdom of Yugoslavia
- Died: 22 February 2005 (aged 86)
- Occupation: Sports journalist

Mladen Delić (15 January 1919 – 22 February 2005) was a Croatian sports commentator.

He studied law at the University of Belgrade, but switched to the School of physical education and sport in Belgrade where he graduated in 1938. From 1946 to 1948 he continued to work as a teacher in Zagreb. During World War II he served in the pro-Axis Croatian Home Guard.

He entered into journalism after the war, writing for Narodni sport and Borba, as well as working for Radio Zagreb. He had his first radio program in 1947. In 1950 he formed an editorial board for sports within Radio Zagreb. He worked as a reporter and commentator from 1965 to his retirement in 1984.

Delić's brother, Svemir, was a footballer who made one appearance for the Croatia national team.

During a decisive international match, Delić delivered his well-known exclamation, "Ljudi moji, pa je li to moguće?" ("My goodness, how is this even possible?"), reacting to a stoppage-time goal by Ljubomir Radanović against Bulgaria. This dramatic late score qualified the national team of Yugoslavia for the final tournament of UEFA Euro 1984. His spontaneous reaction to the play achieved enduring cultural recognition within regional broadcasting history and continues to be frequently referenced as a notable catchphrase across the territories of the former Yugoslavia.

He received a lifetime achievement award from the Croatian Sports Journalists Association in 1994. He is buried in Mirogoj Cemetery.
