= Paradise and Back Again =

Studio album by Anouk
- Released: 21 November 2014
- Genre: Pop rock, soft rock, punk
- Label: Universal Music

Anouk chronology
Live at Symphonica in Rosso (2014)	Paradise and Back Again (2014)	Queen for a Day (2016)

Paradise and Back Again is the ninth studio album by Dutch recording artist Anouk. It was released on 21 November 2014 by Universal Music.

== Track listing ==
1. "Cold Blackhearted Golddiggers"
2. "She Is Beautiful"
3. "Daddy"
4. "Don't Wipe Us Out"
5. "Looking for Love"
6. "Last Goodbye"
7. "Some of Us"
8. "Wigger"
9. "Breath"
10. "Smile & Shine"
11. "Wish He Could See It All"
12. "Places to Go" (bonus track)
13. "You & I" (bonus track)
14. "Feet on the Ground" (bonus track)

== Charts ==
=== Weekly charts ===
Chart (2014–2015)	Peak position
Belgian Albums (Ultratop Flanders)	10
Dutch Albums (Album Top 100)	1

=== Year-end charts ===
Chart (2014)	Position
Dutch Albums (Album Top 100)	6
Chart (2015)	Position
Belgian Albums (Ultratop Flanders)	175
Dutch Albums (Album Top 100)	30
