= Sad Singalong Songs =

Studio album by Anouk
- Released: 17 May 2013
- Recorded: 2011–2013
- Genre: Progressive rock, symphonic rock
- Label: Goldilox

Anouk chronology
To Get Her Together (2011)	Sad Singalong Songs (2013)	Live at Symphonica in Rosso (2014)

Singles from Sad Singalong Songs
- 1. "Birds" Released: March 11, 2013

Sad Singalong Songs is the eighth studio album by Dutch singer Anouk. The album was released on 17 May 2013 by her own record label Goldilox. On 27 December 2012, Anouk released the song "Stardust" via her own YouTube-channel as a preview to her new sound. It was also available as a free download. The album is preceded by the single "Birds", which she performed at the Eurovision Song Contest 2013 in Malmö. Anouk herself revealed the cover art and track listing on her official website.

== Track listing ==
1. "The Rules"
2. "Pretending as Always"
3. "Birds"
4. "The Good Life"
5. "Are You Lonely"
6. "Stardust"
7. "Only a Mother"
8. "Kill"
9. "I Don't Know Nothing"
10. "The Black Side of My Mind"

== Critical reception ==
As it was released in the wake of her Eurovision participation, the album received reviews from a number of Eurovision fansites. Nick Van Lith of escXtra described it as "an impressive album which is anything but mainstream"; whereas Rory Gannon of ESC Views hailed it as a "departure from her previous albums" which "showed Anouk is a versatile singer and not just a one-trick pony".

== Chart performance ==
=== Weekly charts ===
Chart (2013)	Peak position
Belgian Albums (Ultratop Flanders)	5
Belgian Albums (Ultratop Wallonia)	133
Dutch Albums (Album Top 100)	1
German Albums (Offizielle Top 100)	99

=== Year-end charts ===
Chart (2013)	Position
Belgian Albums (Ultratop Flanders)	127
Dutch Albums (Album Top 100)	4

== Certifications ==
Region	Certification	Certified units/sales
Netherlands (NVPI)	Platinum	50,000^{^}
^{^} Shipments figures based on certification alone.
