= Three Days in a Row =

Single by Anouk

from the album For Bitter or Worse
- Released: 28 August 2009
- Recorded: 2009
- Genre: Pop rock, blues
- Length: 4:13
- Label: EMI
- Songwriter(s): Anouk Teeuwe, Martin Gjerstad, Tore Johansson

Anouk singles chronology
"If I Go" (2008)	"Three Days in a Row" (2009)	"Woman" (2009)

"Three Days in a Row" is the first official single of Anouk's sixth album For Bitter or Worse. It was released in August 2009. The song was written by Anouk, Martin Gjerstad and Tore Johansson. The song reached the peak position in both the Dutch Top 40 (where it stayed for four weeks) and the Mega Single Top 100 (where it stayed for one week). It also reached the number-one position in the 3FM Megatop 50 and stayed there for five weeks. In Flanders, the song reached the 19th position in the Ultratop 50.

== Background ==
"Three Days in a Row" opens directly to the chorus of the song, in which Anouk sings she has loved someone for three days, after which she has never seen him again ("Three days in a row / You were mine alone / And I haven't seen you since that day"). Apparently, this person was not aware of Anouk's love for him ("I've been loving you / Without you even knowing"). Anouk also sings she is sure their love will be continued ("I know it's a matter of time / Before it all falls back into place").

The number is considered differently from Anouk's previous work, more tending to blues music. One week after its release, the song was heard 22 million times on the Dutch radio: it reached the first position in the Dutch Airplay-chart. It is quite unusual that a Dutch act manages to reach the first place.

== Music video ==
The music video for "Three Days in a Row" was directed by Kenneth Hope. In the clip, Anouk is seen standing in front of a white background which is showing images of her; on 17 August 2009 the video premiered on Dutch television channel TMF. The video is a "remake" of the clip of another Anouk song ("Michel").

== Charts ==
Chart (2009)	Peak position
Netherlands (Dutch Top 40)	1
Netherlands (Mega Single Top 100)	1
Netherlands (3FM Megatop 50)	1
Belgium (Ultratop 50 Flanders)	19

== See also ==
- List of Dutch Top 40 number-one singles of 2009
