= Anas Canon =

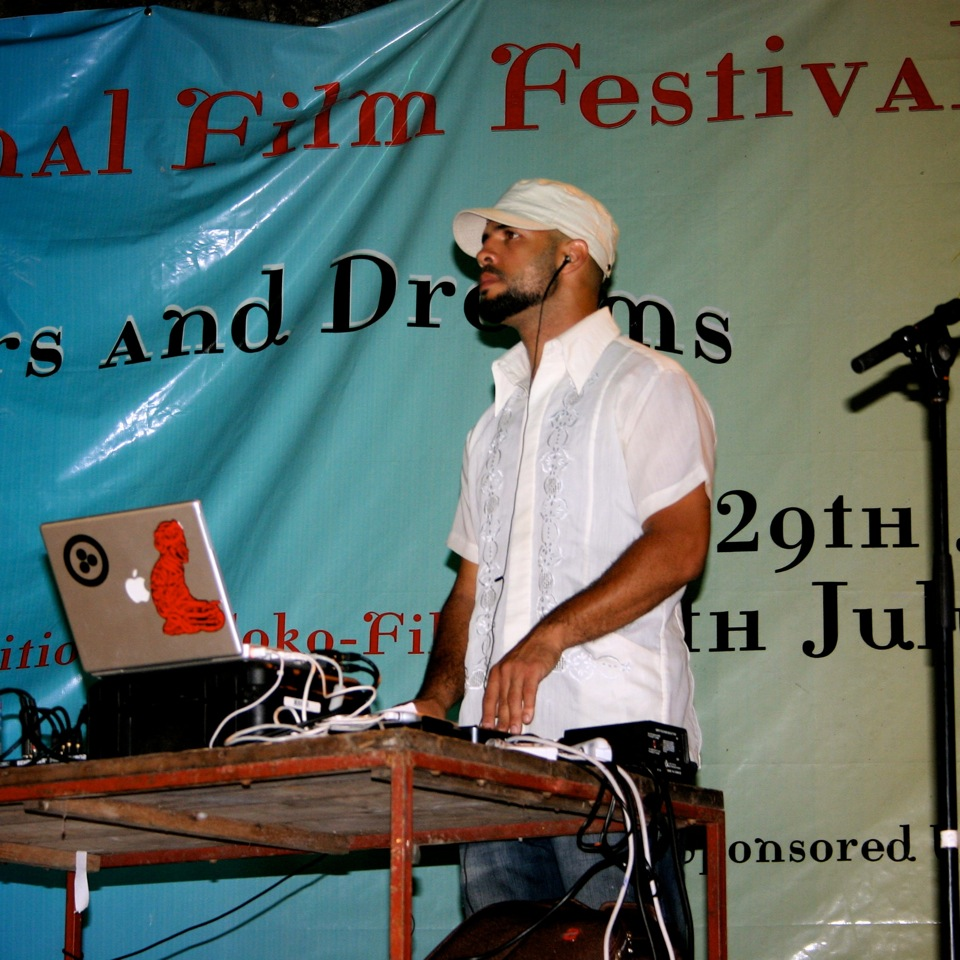
- Anas Canon DJing in Zanzibar, Tanzania at the 2007 Zanzibar International Film Festival

Background information
- Also known as: DJ Anas Canon
- Origin: San Francisco- Bay Area, California, United States
- Occupations: Audio engineer, producer, DJ, songwriter, technical trainer, media consultant
- Instruments: Logic Pro, MIDI Controllers(Akai & Novation), VCI 300 MkII, MPC, Fender Rhodes, Hand Percussion, Ear, Vocals
- Label: http://www.decorativeaudio.com
- Website: http://www.anascanon.com

Anas Canon is an American audio engineer, producer, DJ, songwriter and media consultant. He lectures at conferences, universities, and embassies on cultural diplomacy, globalization, sound arts, and the music industry.

== Career ==
=== Decorative Audio/Very Necessary ===
Canon currently serves as the creative director for the record label "Decorative Audio" as well as the chief creative consultant for its multimedia branch.

=== Remarkable Current ===
Canon served as the artistic director and executive producer for the independent music collective Remarkable Current, which he founded in 2001. Since 2001, Remarkable Current has released 15 full-length albums ranging in genres.

=== Hip Hop Ambassadors ===
As an extension of Decorative Audio, Canon developed the 'Hip Hop Ambassadors' program which presents positive examples of Urban American musicians to the international community. The Hip Hop Ambassadors have toured Indonesia, The UK, Turkey, Jerusalem, The UAE, Morocco, Egypt, Tanzania, Tunisia and Algeria Their Indonesian tour in 2010, sponsored by the US State Department's Performance Arts Initiative, broke US Embassy press records in the region and reached millions of viewers.

=== Music: Producing, Recording and Touring ===
Canon has toured and recorded with artists in America, Europe, Africa. the Middle East, and Asia. In addition to producing records, he creates music for film, television, and commercials.

=== Distinctions ===
His client list includes: Aloe Blacc, The Black Eyed Peas, Mos Def, Lupe Fiasco, Talib Kweli, Common, Zion I, Erik Rico, Amir Sulaiman, Native Deen, and Poetic Pilgrimage.

Canon is highlighted in the documentary film Deen Tight. The documentary continues to be screened around the globe at embassies, universities and cultural centers.

Canon has been published in the Washington Post, the New York Times, CNN.com and has been aired on PBS, BBC and MTV.

Canon broadcasts a monthly DJ set called The Center of Intention.

Since 2006 Canon has been employed by Apple Inc as a Creative.
