= Postmen (band) =

- Origin: Rotterdam, Netherlands
- Genres: Rap, hip hop, reggae
- Years active: 1998–2003, 2012–present
- Labels: TopNotch/V2, Warner Music Group
- Members: The Anonymous Mis / Postman; Shyrock; Alyssa Stotijn
- Past members: G-Boah

Postmen is a reggae/hip hop band from the Netherlands; the original line-up consisted of Remon 'The Anonymous Mis' Stotijn, Michael 'Rollarocka' Parkinson and Gus 'G-Boah' Bear.

== History ==
The group was founded by The Anonymous Mis and G-Boah in 1993. They were influenced by Kool G Rap, Eric B & Rakim, Burning Spear and Bob Marley. On the road, Postmen play with a live band and have appeared on some the largest festivals in Europe.

Just before their debut LP Documents, Rollarocka joins the band and a string of hit singles followed. They enjoyed success in Europe, particularly in their home country of the Netherlands; their string of top 40-hits included "Cocktail", "Crisis", "U Wait" and a cover-version of Doe Maar's 1982 chart-topper "De Bom" (in collaboration with rapper Def Rhymz).

Postmen received regular radio-airplay (particularly during the summer season) although their second and third albums (Revival and Era) were less successful.

Postmen split up in 2005 because the three members had drifted apart. Anonymous Mis continued as Postman and released his solo-album Green in 2006. The first single Downhill features vocals from his award-winning rockstar-wife Anouk. They spent a year in Ohio with their three children to escape the pressures of fame, but eventually settled in Amsterdam. In May 2008 the couple announced their break-up.

Anonymous Mis continued with his current wife Alyssa Stotijn. 2012 saw the return of both Rollarocka (who released a solo-album as Maikal X) and the original name Postmen. They collaborated on a new version of the Doe Maar-song Alles Gaat Voorbij alongside rapper Kraantje Pappie and rerecorded De Bom for inclusion on the Versies-album, which Anonymous Mis produced.

== Discography ==
=== As Postmen ===
- Documents (1998)
- Revival (2001)
- Era (2003)

=== As Postman ===
- Green (2006)
- Postman (2009)
- Apples & Oranges (2011)

== Band members ==
- The Anonymous Mis (Remon Stotijn)
- G-Boah (Gus Bear)
- Rollarocka/Shyrocka (Michael Parkinson) now known as Maikal X
