= To Get Her Together =

Studio album by Anouk
- Released: 20 May 2011
- Recorded: 2009–2011
- Genre: Pop, R&B
- Label: EMI Group 50999 0830572 5
- Producer: Tore Johansson

Anouk chronology
For Bitter or Worse (2009)	To Get Her Together (2011)	Sad Singalong Songs (2013)

Singles from To Get Her Together
- 1. "Down And Dirty" Released: 6 April 2011; 2. "I'm A Cliche" Released: 20 June 2011; 3. "Save Me" Released: 29 August 2011; 4. "What Have You Done" Released: 11 November 2011

To Get Her Together is the seventh studio album from the Dutch singer Anouk. The album was released on 20 May 2011 via the record label EMI.

== Track listing ==
1. "To Get Her Together"
2. "Killer Bee"
3. "Ms. Crazy"
4. "What Have You Done"
5. "Save Me"
6. "Any Younger"
7. "I'm a Cliche"
8. "Down and Dirty"
9. "Little Did I Know"
10. "Better Off Alone"
11. "Been Here Before"

== Personnel ==
- Artwork – Prik! Media (www.prik-media.com)
- Bass – Tore Johansson
- Co-producer – Anouk Teeuwe
- Design [Logo] – Hotel (13)
- Drums – Peter Minorsson (tracks: 2 to 11)
- Guitar – Tore Johansson
- Keyboards – Martin Gjerstad (tracks: 1 to 7, 9 to 11)
- Management – Kees de Koning
- Mastered By – Darcy Proper
- Mixed By – Tore Johansson
- Photography By – Marc de Groot
- Photography By [Assistant] – Jip Markies, Maarten van Viegen
- Producer – Tore Johansson
- Recorded By – Tore Johansson
- Recorded By [Vocal Recording] – John Sonneveld

== Tour ==
At the end of 2011 Anouk announced through her official website that she will be taking a hiatus from performing live. Before her hiatus she will perform 2 times at the Gelredome Stadium and 1 time at the Antwerp Arena.

Date	City	Country	Venue
Europe
8 March 2012	Arnhem	Netherlands	Gelredome
12 March 2012	Arnhem	Netherlands	Gelredome
24 March 2012	Antwerp	Belgium	Sportpaleis

== Charts ==
=== Weekly charts ===
Chart (2011)	Peak position
Belgian Albums (Ultratop Flanders)	4
Dutch Albums (Album Top 100)	1

=== Year-end charts ===
Chart (2011)	Position
Belgian Albums (Ultratop Flanders)	48
Dutch Albums (Album Top 100)	2

Chart (2012)	Position
Dutch Albums (Album Top 100)	93
