= Together Alone (Anouk album) =

Studio album by Anouk
- Released: 15 October 1997
- Recorded: 1996–97
- Genre: Pop rock, alternative rock, post-grunge
- Length: 38:44
- Label: Dino Music BMG
- Producer: Barry Hay, George Kooymans, John Sonneveld

Anouk chronology
| Together Alone (1997) | Urban Solitude (1999) |

Singles from Together Alone
- 1. "Mood Indigo" Released: 1996; 2. "Nobody's Wife" Released: August 1997; 3. "It's So Hard" Released: 10 April 1998; 4. "Sacrifice" Released: 21 August 1998

Together Alone is the debut studio album released by Dutch singer Anouk. It was highly successful in the Netherlands and featured three top 30 singles: "Nobody's Wife", "It's So Hard" and "Sacrifice". The album was produced by Barry Hay and George Kooymans from the Dutch rock band Golden Earring.

The rare collector's item (EAN code 8712195760974) includes a second disc with "Nobody's Wife" remixed, and videos for "Nobody's Wife" and "Sacrifice".

Professional ratings
Review scores
| Source | Rating |
|---|---|
| MusicMeter.nl | (3.2/5) link |

== Track listing ==
1. "Nobody's Wife"
2. "Together Alone"
3. "It's So Hard"
4. "The Other Side of Me"
5. "Pictures on Your Skin"
6. "Sacrifice"
7. "Fluid Conduction"
8. "My Life"
9. "It's a Shame"
10. "Time Is a Jailer"
11. "Mood Indigo"

== Musical credits ==
- Tren van Enckevort - accordion
- Pim Koopman - string arrangement
- Michel van Schie - bass guitar
- Hans Eijkenaar - drums
- Satindra Kalpoe - drums on "Mood Indigo"
- Lex Bolderdijk - guitar
- John Legrand - harmonica
- Eddy Conard - percussion
- Nico Brandsen - keyboards
- Frank Carillo - guitar
- George Kooymans - backing vocals, guitar
- Barry Hay - backing vocals
- Carlos Lake - bass guitar on "Mood Indigo"

== Staff ==
- John Sonneveld - sound engineer, production
- Sander van der Heide - mastering
- Frans Jansen - photography
- Peters & Moest'l - graphics
- Barry Hay - production
- George Kooymans - production

== Certifications ==
Certifications and sales for Together Alone
| Region | Certification | Certified units/sales |
|---|---|---|
| Belgium (BRMA) | Gold | 25,000^{*} |
| Netherlands (NVPI) | 4× Platinum | 400,000^{^} |
| Sweden (GLF) | Gold | 40,000^{^} |
^{*} Sales figures based on certification alone.^{^} Shipments figures based on certification alone.
