= Remon Stotijn =

Dutch rapper and producer (born 1975)

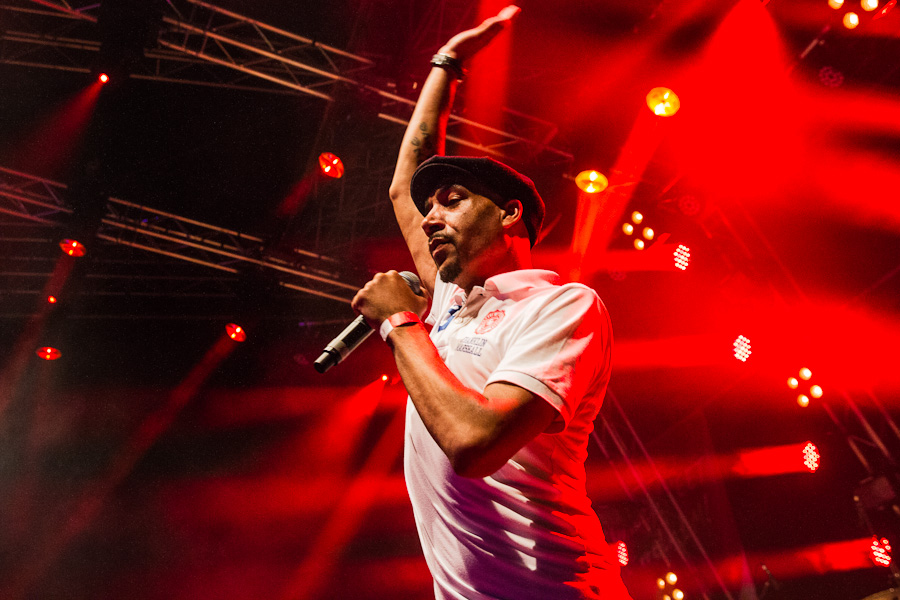

Background information
- Also known as: Postman; Mystery; The Anonymous Mis
- Born: 27 December 1975 (age 50); Rotterdam, Netherlands
- Genres: Hip hop; reggae
- Occupations: Rapper; record producer; songwriter
- Years active: 1993–present
- Label: Top Notch

Remon Stotijn (born 27 December 1975), known professionally as Postman or The Anonymous Mis, is a Dutch rapper and record producer, who is a member of the band Postmen.

== Biography ==
Remon Stotijn was born on December 27, 1975, in Rotterdam, the Netherlands. His father was Surinamese, his mother was Dutch and came from Rotterdam, the city he grew up in.

At the age of 16 he was part of the Rotterdam hiphop band Secret Recipe.

In 1993 Stotijn and G-Boah (a.k.a. Gus Bear) formed the band Postmen. Stotijn is the author of all Postmen songs.

In 2004 he married the rock singer Anouk. He has written 2 songs for her album Hotel New York. In 2005 he moved to the U.S. with his wife and their children (they eventually have three). Stotijn and Anouk subsequently divorced in May 2008.

January 2012 Stotijn signed a deal with management company De Water Music & Media.

August 2012 Stotijn wrote and produced several tracks for the Doe Maar album Versies; it featured collaborations with rap-artists and a new version of Postmen's twelve year-old cover of the 1982 chart-topper De Bom.

== Producer ==
Remon Stotijn produced or co-produced songs for:

- the band 'Postmen: all songs
- the rapper E-Life: all albums
- the rapper Extince: the song Zoete inval (1999), co-produced by Iwan den Boestert
- the rapper Def Rhymz
  - the album De goeiste (2000)
  - the album De allergoeiste (2001)
- the band Doe Maar: the album Trillend op mijn benen(2000), co-produced by Frans Hendriks and Nico Brandsen
- the rapper U-Niq: the album Married to Music' (2000)
- the female singer Karima: the song Grief (2001)
- the rapper Raymzter: the album Rayalistisch (2003)
- the female singer Berget Lewis: the album Finally (2007), co-produced by Antoon Tolsma (Dutchflower), Stephan Geusebroek, Tjeerd Oosterhuis and Tjeerd van Zanen
