= Dino Entertainment =

Defunct Dutch record label

- Logo of Dino Music, record label of Dino Entertainment

Dino Entertainment was a firm specializing in the compilation market of the late 1980s and early 1990s, releasing records such as the That Loving Feeling and Energy Rush range of CDs, in competition with Telstar Records, Arcade Records and K-Tel.

Despite a relatively successful run at releasing various genres of music under the Dino label, increasing competition in the Compilation sector forced Dino to close down in 1997 after releasing just over 130 different albums in eight years. Major companies such as EMI and Virgin became fiercely competitive in the wake of their successful Now That's What I Call Music brand, while BMG launched their own compilation subsidiary Global Television, Warner Music launched warner.esp.tv, Sony Music released their compilations under the Sony Music TV banner and Polygram became Universal in 1999 and their TV advertised material was released on Universal Music TV.

However, prior to its demise, Dino did score many hits in varying genres of music. As noted, Dance was a speciality for the label although 1970s revival albums, Love Songs and A.O.R Rock collections all became big sellers for the label.

== Series released by Dino Entertainment ==
=== That Loving Feeling ===
The first series Dino released were That Loving Feeling which launched in December 1989. Their particular longevity was because Dance compilations dominated the Compilation Chart in 1989 and 1990 and Love Songs made a welcome change to the older music buyer.

- That Loving Feeling Volume 1 (12/89. #3. 14 wks)
- That Loving Feeling Volume 2 (03/90. #5. 26 wks)
- That Loving Feeling Volume 3 (06/90. #1. 31 wks)
- That Loving Feeling Volume 4 (04/91. #4. 14 wks)
- That Loving Feeling Volume 5 (10/91. #2. 15 wks)
- That Loving Feeling Volume 6 (09/93. #3. 12 wks)
- That Loving Feeling Volume 7 (08/94. #4. 10 wks)
- The Very Best of That Loving Feeling (12/93. #2. 21 wks)

=== Hardcore ===
These Dance compilations released by Dino contained the word Hardcore somewhere in the title and became a very successful series between 1991 and 1992. These albums were released as a single-CD format, with 20 tracks on each. Hardcore albums always contained big dance hits first, and then less well-known, underground tracks at the end, making the series an attractive purchase for mainstream dance fans as well as underground followers of the genre.

- Hardcore Uproar (03/91. #1. 9 wks)
- Hardcore Dancefloor (07/91. #2. 10 wks)
- Hardcore Ecstasy (11/91. #1. 16 wks)
- Essential Hardcore (12/91. #1. 10 wks)
- Heavenly Hardcore (03/92. #2. 9 wks)

=== Energy Rush ===
After a series of one-off Dance compilations including Cold Sweat and Trance Dance, Dino launched a new Dance series called Energy Rush in late 1992 which out-lasted the Hardcore series by many years. The formats were identical, a single-CD release with chart hits at the beginning of the album and more club-orientated material at the end. Like Telstar's earlier Deep Heat series, each release had a suffix naming each volume. The series ended in 1995 when Dance music became less popular, with genres such as Britpop and R&B gaining more mainstream success.

- Energy Rush (10/92. #1. 6 wks)
- Energy Rush II (12/92. #7. 7 wks)
- Energy Rush Level 3 (01/93. #3. 6 wks)
- Energy Rush Presents Dance Hits 93 (04/93. #1. 12 wks)
- Energy Rush Phase 4 (06/93. #2. 6 wks)
- Energy Rush Factor 5 (09/93. #3. 5 wks)
- Energy Rush Presents Dance Hits of the Year (10/93. #3. 13 wks)
- Energy Rush Safe Six (12/93. #5. 7 wks)
- Energy Rush – Euro Dance Hits 94 (03/94. #5. 4 wks)
- Energy Rush 7th Heaven (04/94. #2. 5 wks)
- Energy Rush Xtermin8 (05/94. #1. 8 wks)
- Energy Rush Dance Hits 94 (08/94. #3. 8 wks)
- Energy Rush K9 (02/95. #3. 4 wks)

=== Pure Swing ===
This successful series focused on current and past R&B and Hip hop tracks or "new jack swing", with the genre becoming more popular with mainstream buyers. The series launched in March 1995 and ran for several volumes until 1996. Usually issued as a single-CD, some of the releases (Pure Swing IV for example) were double-CDs.

- Pure Swing (03/95. #3. 9 wks)
- Pure Swing II (06/95. #4. 5 wks)
- Pure Swing III (09/95. #3. 8 wks)
- Pure Swing IV (11/95. #1. 7 wks)
- Pure Swing V (01/96. #5. 6 wks)
- Pure Swing 96 (04/96. #9. 3 wks)

=== Drivetime ===
The Drivetime series brought together popular 'driving anthems', with tracks often made popular through extensive Radio play, hence the title's borrowing of many Radio Stations' evening programme name. Although not a huge success in chart-terms, this series however contained many rare tracks previously difficult to find on CD at the time. The four volumes were all double-CD releases, each containing between 34 and 38 tracks ranging from the 1960s through to more recent radio hits of the time.

- Drivetime (04/95. #5. 8 wks)
- Drivetime 2 (07/95. #4. 7 wks)
- Drivetime 3 (01/96. #4. 6 wks)
- Drivetime 4 (08/96. #8. 3 wks)

When Dino Entertainment closed in 1997, the brand transferred to Universal Music who released several compilations using the Drivetime name, although these were less successful, failing to track the Compilations Chart Top 20.

== Other releases ==
- The Rhythm Divine ~ Two double-CD volumes of 1970s Disco hits.
- Blues Brother Soul Sister ~ Three double-CD volumes (and a 'Best of' collection) containing Blues and Soul classics.
- All Time Rock Classics- Rock hits from the 70s and 80s.
- Rock 'n' Roll Lovesongs ~ Two double-CD volumes of classic Rock 'n' Roll hits.
- Rock 'N' Roll Is Here To Stay ~ "Two CD Collection of 40 Original 50's & 60's Rock 'n' Roll Hits." 2 different versions with different album artwork were available with one being in a dual-style thick jewel case and the other in a 2CD flip-over style jewel case.
- Stompin' Party ~ "40 Party Hits ranging from the 1950s to 1980s and known as "The World's Greatest Party Album" as stated on the album artwork."
- It's Electric ~ A successful single-CD collection of New Romantic classics. Reached #2 in April 1994.
- Ska Mania ~ A double-CD collection of Ska music from the late 1970s and early 1980s.
- Rock Anthems ~ Two double-CD volumes of anthemic rock tracks. Volume 1 made #3 and stayed in the Compilation Chart Top 20 for 17 weeks.
- Eighties Soul Weekender ~ A cool collection of Soul classics from the early to mid-1980s.
- Pure Jazz Moods ~ A double-CD collection of Jazz music.
- Dance Massive ~ Three volumes of current Dance hits from 1994 to 1996.
- Vienna Symphonic Orchestra Project ~ The Power of Rock
- Heartlands ~ 18 Hits on one Vinyl LP Released in 1992

== Sublabels ==
- Crash Bang! Records – a dance music label releasing singles and albums by artists including Bedrock, Chris & James, Eve Gallagher, plus compilations including Sundazed, The Anthems and Therapy Session by DJ Mark Dynamix
- Dino Music (Australia) – distributing albums/singles by Kamahl, Amadin, DJ BoBo (1992–1996) as well as various compilation sets of chart hits, dance music (notably dance label "Pro-DJ International") and country music.
- Dino Music (Germany)
- Firm Music,
- Pump Records

== See also ==
- Lists of record labels
