= Urban Solitude =

Studio album by Anouk
- Released: 1999
- Recorded: NOB Audio 1 (Hilversum)
- Genre: Pop rock
- Label: Dino Music 7243 8602242 4
- Producer: Anouk

Anouk chronology
Together Alone (1997)	Urban Solitude (1999)	Graduated Fool (2002)

Urban Solitude is the second studio album by Dutch pop/rock singer Anouk. It was released in 1999. It yielded four singles: R U Kiddin' Me (#2), The Dark (#8), Michel (#3) and Don't, which peaked at number 13 in the Dutch chart. The album was certified platinum in the Netherlands, with 100,000 copies sold and gold in Belgium.

== Track listing ==
1. "In The Sand"
2. "Don't"
3. "R U Kiddin' Me"
4. "Tom Waits"
5. "Urban Solitude"
6. "U Being U"
7. "Michel"
8. "The Dark"
9. "My Best Wasn't Good Enough" (featuring Dinand Woesthoff)
10. "It Wasn't Me"
11. "Cry"
12. "Body Brain"
13. "My Friend"

== Personnel ==
- Artwork By [Sleeve Concept/ideas] – Anouk Teeuwe
- Co-producer – Ronald Trijber
- Engineer – Ronald Trijber
- Engineer [Assistant] – Frits Rosingh
- Mastered By – Chris Bellman
- Mixed By – Erwin Musper
- Mixed By [Assistant] – Regula Mirz, Tracey Brown
- Music By, Lyrics By – Anouk Teeuwe (tracks: 1 to 8, 10 to 13), Bart van Veen (tracks: 1 to 5, 7, 8, 10 to 13)
- Photography – Frans Jansen
- Producer – Anouk Teeuwe
