= For Bitter or Worse =

Studio album by Anouk
- Released: 18 September 2009
- Recorded: 2008–2009
- Genre: Pop; R&B
- Label: EMI Group 50999 4562182 6
- Producer: Tore Johansson

Anouk chronology
Live at Gelredome (2008)	For Bitter or Worse (2009)	To Get Her Together (2011)

Singles from For Bitter or Worse
- 1. "Three Days in a Row" Released: 1 August 2009; 2. "Woman" Released: 24 November 2009; 3. "For Bitter or Worse" Released: 16 February 2010; 4. "Lovedrunk" Released: 7 May 2010

For Bitter or Worse is the sixth studio album by Dutch singer Anouk. It was released on 18 September 2009, via EMI.

The first single, "Three Days in a Row", came out in August. It reached the top of the Dutch charts in September, making it Anouk's first number-one in the country. In June of the same year, the song "Today" was issued as promo material. It was so successful that, despite never being released as an official single, it reached number 50 on the Dutch chart. The second single, "Woman", was sent to radio stations at the end of October. After just one day, it reached number one on the airplay chart.

== Track listing ==
1. "Three Days in a Row"
2. "In This World"
3. "Woman"
4. "Lay It Down"
5. "8 Years"
6. "My Shoes"
7. "Walk to the Bay"
8. "Today"
9. "Hold On"
10. "Lovedrunk"
11. "Faith in My Moon"
12. "For Bitter or Worse"

== Charts ==
=== Weekly charts ===
Chart (2009)	Peak position
Belgian Albums (Ultratop Flanders)	2
Dutch Albums (Album Top 100)	1

=== Year-end charts ===
Chart (2009)	Position
Belgian Albums (Ultratop Flanders)	25
Dutch Albums (Album Top 100)	2
Chart (2010)	Position
Dutch Albums (Album Top 100)	13
