= Hotel New York =

Studio album by Anouk
- Released: December 3, 2004
- Recorded: 2004
- Studio: Wisseloord Studios (Hilversum)
- Genre: Pop rock
- Length: 45:46
- Label: EMI
- Producers: Anouk, Clif Norrell

Anouk chronology
Update (2004)	Hotel New York (2004)	Anouk Is Alive (2006)

Professional ratings
Review scores
Source	Rating
MacNed	3/5 stars
MusicMeter.nl	3.4/5

Hotel New York is the fourth studio album recorded by the Dutch pop/rock singer Anouk and released on December 3, 2004, in the Netherlands. The album is named for the location where Anouk wrote all its songs: Hotel New York in Rotterdam. Debuting at number one, the album was a major success, staying at that top spot for twelve weeks. "Hotel New York" remained on the Dutch albums chart for eighty-seven weeks, eventually going triple platinum. In Belgium, the album spent a week at number one and stayed in the top 50 for 72 weeks. The first single off the album "Girl" peaked at number two on the Dutch Top 40, and so did "Lost", the second single. The third single "Jerusalem" peaked at number twenty and the final single "One Word" peaked again at number two.

== Track listing ==
- Standard
1. "Girl" – 3:30
2. "Heaven Knows" – 3:45
3. "More Than You Deserve" – 4:20
4. "Falling Sun" – 3:32
5. "Lost" – 3:42
6. "Alright" – 3:33
7. "Help" – 3:24
8. "Our Own Love" – 3:34
9. "Jerusalem" – 3:55
10. "One Word" – 4:02
11. "I Spy" – 3:44
12. "Fading" – 4:45
- Live Edition (EMI - December 5, 2005)
13. "Jerusalem" [live and acoustic] – 4:38
14. "Alright" [live and acoustic] – 3:40
15. "Lost" [live and acoustic] – 3:52
16. "Falling Sun" [live and acoustic] – 3:56
17. "Girl" [live and acoustic] – 3:44
18. "Nobody's Wife" [live and acoustic] – 4:21

== Singles ==
Girl

- Released: November 11, 2004
- Format: CD
- Label: EMI
- Writer: Anouk, Bart van Veen
- Producer: Anouk, Clif Norrell
- Chart position: #2 NL, #2 BEL, #94 EU
- Tracks: CD single
1. "Girl" – 3:30
2. "Girl" [remix] – 3:33

Lost

- Released: March 5, 2005
- Format: CD
- Label: EMI
- Writer: Anouk, Bart van Veen
- Producer: Anouk, Clif Norrell
- Chart position: #2 NL, #7 BEL, #113 EU#2 Norway
- Tracks: CD single
1. "Lost" – 3:42
2. "Fading" [acoustic] – 3:48

Jerusalem

- Released: July 15, 2005
- Format: CD
- Label: EMI
- Writer: Anouk, Bart van Veen
- Producer: Anouk, Clif Norrell
- Chart position: #20 NL, #44 BE
- Tracks: CD single
1. "Jerusalem" – 3:55
2. "Girl" [acoustic] – 3:32
3. "Lost" [demo] – 3:36

One Word

- Released: November 11, 2005
- Format: CDS, Digipak
- Label: EMI / Virgin
- Writer: Anouk, Bart van Veen
- Producer: Anouk, Clif Norrell
- Chart position: #2 NL, #29 BE, #124 EU
- Tracks: Digipak (part 1)
1. "One Word" – 3:18
2. "Jerusalem" [live and acoustic] – 4:38
3. "Alright" [live and acoustic] – 3:40
4. "Lost" [live and acoustic] – 3:52

== Charts ==
Chart (2004)	Peak position	Certification	Sales
Belgian UltraTop 50 Albums	1 (1 wk)	Platinum	50,000
Dutch Mega Album Top 100	1 (12 wks)	3× Platinum	210,000

== Achievements ==
=== Album ===
- Hotel New York peaked at number 2 in the 2005 Album top 100 Year-end charts, meaning it was the second best-selling album in the Netherlands.
- In Belgium, Hotel New York sold over 50,000 copies and thus was certified platinum. EMI Holland confirmed on December 2 that the album had shipped over 210,000 copies in the Netherlands, resulting a 3× Platinum certification.
- Hotel New York was also a big hit in Israel, 3 singles of the album charted there at the same time: Lost is the single with the highest rating at #2 (11 weeks), Jerusalem at #7 (8 weeks) and Girl was number 10 for the 10th consecutive week. (This hit list is based on airplay and interactive voting.) [as of February 2].

=== Singles ===
- "Girl", the first single released from the album, became the best-performing single ever for a female artist in the Netherlands, despite the fact it never topped the Dutch Top 40. With this record, she beats Céline Dion with "My Heart Will Go On", who kept the number one position for best selling female single for a long time, and Britney Spears' "...Baby One More Time", which was number 2 and now #3 best-performing female single in the Netherlands.
- "Lost" reached the number 9 position on May 17, 2008, three years after its release, on the Norway charts. The single has been added on the album Who's Your Momma (2007) and planned for a release in June 2008
- "One Word" was a big hit in Albania; it reached the number one position on the radio airplay charts.

=== Awards ===
- 2005 3FM Radio Awards:

- Best Female, Schaal van Rigter (best single "Girl") (won)
- Duiveltje (musicians votes their best colleague) (won)

- 2005 MTV Awards:

- Best Dutch/Belgium Act (won)

- Dutch 2005 TMF Awards:

- Best National Female Artist (won)

- Dutch 2006 TMF Awards:

- Best National Female Artist (won)
- Best National Rock Act (won)
- Best National Video (Postman feat. Anouk - "Downhill") (won)

- Belgian 2005 TMF Awards:

- Best International Album of 2005 (Hotel New York) (won)
- Best International Video ("Girl") (won)
- Best International Female Artist (won)

This album has been released with the Copy Control protection system in some regions.
