= Birds (Anouk song) =

2013 song by Anouk

Single by Anouk

from the album Sad Singalong Songs
- Released: 11 March 2013
- Genre: Progressive rock; symphonic rock
- Length: 3:23
- Label: Goldilox
- Songwriters: Tore Johansson, Martin Gjerstad, Anouk Teeuwe

Anouk singles chronology
"What Have You Done" (2011)	"Birds" (2013)	"Pretending As Always" (2013)

Eurovision Song Contest 2013 entry
- Country: Netherlands
- Artist: Anouk
- Languages: English
- Composers: Tore Johansson & Martin Gjerstad
- Lyricist: Anouk Teeuwe

Finals performance
- Semi-final result: 6th
- Semi-final points: 75
- Final result: 9th
- Final points: 114

Entry chronology
- ◄ "You and Me" (2012)
- "Calm After the Storm" (2014) ►

"Birds" is a song recorded by Dutch singer Anouk, released as the first single from her eighth studio album Sad Singalong Songs (2013). The song was written by Anouk Teeuwe and composed by Tore Johansson, Martin Gjerstad and Anouk Teeuwe. It is best known as the Netherlands' entry to the Eurovision Song Contest 2013 held in Malmö, Sweden. The song competed in the first semi-final on 14 May 2013 for and managed to qualify for a spot in the final on 18 May 2013, the Netherlands' first qualification in 9 years, where Anouk achieved 9th place in a field of 39; the best result for the Netherlands since the 1999 competition.

== Background ==
On 17 October 2012, Dutch broadcaster TROS selected Anouk to represent the Netherlands at the Eurovision Song Contest 2013. Anouk selected "Birds" as the Dutch entry and presented it during a press conference on 11 March 2013.

In November 2011, Anouk played a portion of the song during an interview on the Dutch pop/rock radio station 3FM. The rules of the Eurovision Song Contest for 2013 indicate that a song cannot be released prior to 1 September 2012. However, a new clause added for the 2013 contest allows songs, such as in the case of "Birds", to compete if their previous airing in public would not give them an advantage over the other competing entries. The European Broadcasting Union cleared "Birds" for the competition under this new rule.

The official videoclip of the song was released on 15 May 2013, together with the clips of three other new songs of Anouk.

== Track listing ==
Digital download

1. "Birds" - 3:23

CD single (Universal M27611)

1. "Birds" - 3:23
2. "Stardust" - 3:31

== Charts ==
=== Weekly charts ===
Chart (2013)	Peak position
Austria (Ö3 Austria Top 40)	74
Belgium (Ultratop 50 Flanders)	12
Belgium (Ultratip Bubbling Under Wallonia)	24
Finland (The Official Finnish Download Chart)	22
Germany (GfK)	49
Iceland (RÚV)	5
Ireland (IRMA)	71
Netherlands (Dutch Top 40)	3
Netherlands (Single Top 100)	1
Sweden (DigiListan)	3
UK Singles (Official Charts Company)	158

=== Year-end charts ===
Chart (2013)	Position
Netherlands (Dutch Top 40)	34
Netherlands (Single Top 100)	37
