= Graduated Fool =

Studio album by Anouk
- Released: 22 November 2002
- Recorded: Wisseloord Studios (Hilversum)
- Genre: Pop rock, alternative rock, post-grunge
- Label: Dino Music 7243 5811702 8
- Producer: Anouk

Anouk chronology
Urban Solitude (1999)	Graduated Fool (2002)	Update (2004)

Graduated Fool is the third studio album from Dutch singer Anouk, released on 22 November 2002. The album yielded three singles: "Everything" peaked at number 12 in the Dutch top 40, second single "I Live For You" failed to chart and third single "Hail" peaked at number 31, due to a lack of promotion because Anouk was pregnant with her son Elijah. The album itself peaked at number 3 in the Dutch album chart. With 25.000 copies sold, it was her least successful album to date.

== Track list ==
1. "Too Long" – 3:55
2. "Everything" – 4:24
3. "Hail" – 3:53
4. "Who Cares" – 4:37
5. "Graduated Fool" – 3:52
6. "Stop Thinking" – 4:18
7. "No Time to Waste" – 3:57
8. "Searching" – 3:54
9. "Margarita Chum" – 4:19
10. "I Live for You" – 3:40
11. "Bigger Side" – 4:41

== Personnel ==
- Bass – Michel van Schie
- Drums – Hans Eijkenaar
- Electric Guitar – Leendert Haaksma, Lex Bolderdijk (tracks: 2, 4), René van Barneveld
- Engineer – Holger Schwedt, John Sonneveld
- Mastered By – Greg Calbi
- Mixed By – Michael H. Brauer
- Mixed By [Assistant] – Nathaniel Chan, Ricardo Chavarria
- Photography By – Allard Honigh, Frans Jansen (3)
- Producer – Anouk
- Written-By – A. Teeuwe (tracks: 1 to 10), B. van Veen (tracks: 1 to 10)

== Charts ==
=== Weekly charts ===
Chart (2002–03)	Peak position
Belgian Albums (Ultratop Flanders)	25
Dutch Albums (Album Top 100)	3

=== Year-end charts ===
Chart (2002)	Position
Dutch Albums (Album Top 100)	51
Chart (2003)	Position
Dutch Albums (Album Top 100)	41
