= Svemir Delić =

Croatian footballer (1929–2017)

Personal information
- Full name: Svemir Delić
- Date of birth: 14 September 1929
- Place of birth: Sinj, Split Oblast, Kingdom of Serbs, Croats and Slovenes
- Date of death: 3 January 2017 (aged 87)
- Place of death: Split, Croatia
- Positions: Right-back; centre-back

Youth career
- Junak Sinj

Senior career*
Years	Team	Apps	(Gls)
–1949	Junak Sinj		
1949–1952	Dinamo Zagreb	40	(0)
1952–1954	Hajduk Split	13	(0)
1955–1959	NK Zagreb		

International career
1951	Yugoslavia B	1	(0)
1956	PR Croatia	1	(0)
- * Club domestic league appearances and goals

Svemir "Cico" Delić (14 September 1929 – 3 January 2017), was a Croatian and Yugoslav footballer who played as a defender and made one appearance for the Croatia national team.

== International career ==
Delić earned his first and only cap for Croatia in the team's 1956 friendly match against Indonesia. The fixture, which was played on 12 September in Zagreb, finished as a 5–2 win for Croatia.

== Personal life ==
Delić's brother Mladen was a prominent Croatian sports commentator. Svemir was married to Mirjana for over 60 years, and died on 3 January 2017 in Split at the age of 87.

== Career statistics ==
=== International ===
PR Croatia
Year	Apps	Goals
1956	1	0
Total	1	0
