= Nobody's Wife (song) =

1997 single by Anouk

Single by Anouk

from the album Together Alone
- B-side: "It's a Shame"
- Released: August 1997
- Studio: Lagune (Rijkevorsel, Belgium)
- Genre: Rock
- Length: 3:25
- Label: Dino; BMG
- Songwriters: Anouk Teeuwe; Bart van Veen; Satindra Kalpoe
- Producers: John Sonneveld; George Kooymans; Barry Hay

Anouk singles chronology
"Mood Indigo" (1996)	"Nobody's Wife" (1997)	"It's So Hard" (1997)

Music video
- "Nobody's Wife" on YouTube

"Nobody's Wife" is the second single released from Dutch singer-songwriter Anouk's debut studio album, Together Alone (1997). The song, a rock ballad, was written by Anouk, Satindra Kalpoe, and Bart van Veen, and it was produced by George Kooymans, Barry Hay, and John Sonneveld. It was released through Dino Music in the Netherlands and Ireland, BMG in Europe and Australia, and Columbia Records in the United States.

First issued as a single in the Netherlands, "Nobody's Wife" became a hit, reaching number two on both the Dutch Top 40 and the Single Top 100 charts. In early 1998, the song began to gain popularity in the rest of mainland Europe, especially in the Flanders region of Belgium and the Nordic countries, reaching the top 10 in these regions; in Iceland, it peaked at number one for two weeks. A music video shot in black and white was made for the song, featuring clips of Anouk singing and dancing to the song.

== Composition ==
"Nobody's Wife" is published in the key of F♯ major with a tempo of 98 beats per minute.

== Critical reception ==
Music & Media wrote about the song. On the 13 December 1997 issue, Dutch music programmer Ben Houdijk said of the song, "It might be loud on the surface, but under the skin, there's a beautiful song. A rock song with balls is a gift to radio in these ballad-flooded times." Meanwhile, on the 31 January 1998 issue, Music & Media commented, "This is an excellent rock ballad by the Golden Earring endorsed Dutch debutante artist [...]. Anouk has made a bold—and as it turns out, convincing—move into the territory already occupied by the likes of Alanis Morissette and Meredith Brooks." British trade paper Music Week wrote that while the track is not "original", it appeals to both young and old rock music fans.

== Release and chart performance ==
The song was first released in the Netherlands in August 1997. It first charted on the Single Top 100 chart on 20 September 1997 at number 94, then debuted on the Dutch Top 40 Tipparade chart on 4 October at number 30. On 15 November, the song rose to number two on both charts on stayed at that rank for four weeks on both listings. It remained on the Dutch Top 40 for 20 weeks and the Single Top 100 for 40 weeks, earning a platinum certification from the NVPI for shipments of over 75,000 units. According to the Single Top 100 chart, it was the ninth-best-selling hit of the year.

After its Dutch success, "Nobody's Wife" began to receive airplay throughout western and northern Europe. It made its first foreign chart appearance on the Swedish Singles Chart on 12 December 1997, climbing to a peak of number two on 16 January 1998 and keeping the position for five weeks. It ended 1998 as Sweden's 17th-most-successful song and was certified platinum for shipping over 30,000 copies. The single is also certified platinum in Norway, where it peaked at number two for three weeks. In the Flanders region of Belgium, "Nobody's Wife" reached number five on the week of 28 February and eventually went gold for sales exceeding 25,000, and in Denmark, it reached number six in late January.

In February 1998, "Nobody's Wife" charted in Finland, rising to number nine three weeks after its debut. The song then garnered success in Iceland starting in early March, debuting at number four on the Íslenski listinn chart and topping the listing on the weeks of 20 and 27 March. In the United Kingdom, the song was released on 8 June 1998 but did not chart. The same month, on 27 June, the single debuted on the French Singles Chart at number 80. It reached its peak of number 34 on 8 August and spent a total of 14 weeks in the top 100. In Italy, "Nobody's Wife" peaked at number five and stayed on the chart for nine weeks. The song was released in the United States in September 1998 but failed to make a significant impact, charting only on the Billboard Heritage Rock chart at number 32. In March 2010, the single appeared on the German Singles Chart for only one week, at number 87.

== Track listings ==
- Dutch CD single
1. "Nobody's Wife" – 3:26
- European CD single
1. "Nobody's Wife" – 3:25
2. "It's a Shame" – 3:26
- European maxi-CD single
1. "Nobody's Wife" (US remix) – 3:25
2. "Nobody's Wife" (album version) – 3:25
3. "Nobody's Wife" (edited album version) – 3:18
4. "It's a Shame" – 3:26
- UK and Australian CD single
1. "Nobody's Wife" (radio edit) – 3:18
2. "Nobody's Wife" (album version) – 3:25
3. "Nobody's Wife" (instrumental) – 3:26
4. "It's a Shame" – 3:26
- US 7-inch single

A. "Nobody's Wife" – 3:25
B. "Sacrifice" – 3:58

== Credits and personnel ==
Credits are adapted from the Dutch CD single and the Together Alone album booklet.

Studio

- Recorded at Lagune Studios (Rijkevorsel, Belgium)

Personnel

- Anouk Teeuwe – writing, vocals
- Bart van Veen – writing
- Satindra Kalpoe – writing
- Lex Bolderdijk – guitar
- Michel van Schie – bass
- Hans Eijkenaar – drums
- Eddy Conard – percussion
- John Sonneveld – production, engineering
- George Kooymans – production
- Barry Hay – production
- Sander van der Heide – mastering
- Jansen & Holland B.V. – cover design
- Frans Jansen – cover photo

== Charts ==
=== Weekly charts ===
Weekly chart performance for "Nobody's Wife"
Chart (1997–1998)	Peak position
Belgium (Ultratop 50 Flanders)	5
Denmark (IFPI)	6
Europe (Eurochart Hot 100)	23
Finland (Suomen virallinen lista)	9
France (SNEP)	34
Greece (IFPI Greece)	7
Iceland (Íslenski Listinn Topp 40)	1
Italy (FIMI)	5
Italy Airplay (Music & Media)	6
Netherlands (Dutch Top 40)	2
Netherlands (Single Top 100)	2
Norway (VG-lista)	2
Sweden (Sverigetopplistan)	2
US Heritage Rock (Billboard)	32

Chart (2010)	Peak position
Germany (GfK)	87

=== Year-end charts ===
Annual chart rankings for "Nobody's Wife"
Chart (1997)	Position
Netherlands (Dutch Top 40)	28
Netherlands (Single Top 100)	9
Sweden (Topplistan)	30

Chart (1998)	Position
Belgium (Ultratop 50 Flanders)	25
Europe (Eurochart Hot 100)	80
Europe Border Breakers (Music & Media)	13
Iceland (Íslenski Listinn Topp 40)	6
Netherlands (Dutch Top 40)	92
Netherlands (Single Top 100)	34
Sweden (Hitlistan)	17

=== Decade-end charts ===
Chart (1990–1999)	Rank
Netherlands (Dutch Top 40)	48

== Certifications ==
Region	Certification	Certified units/sales
Belgium (BRMA)	Gold	25,000^{*}
Netherlands (NVPI)	Platinum	75,000^{^}
Norway (IFPI Norway)	Platinum	
Sweden (GLF)	Platinum	30,000^{^}
^{*} Sales figures based on certification alone.^{^} Shipments figures based on certification alone.
