= Raymzter =

Dutch rapper (born 1979)

- Born: Raymond Christiaan Rensen; 1979 (age 46–47)
- Origin: Almere, Netherlands
- Genre: Hip hop
- Occupation: Rapper
- Years active: 1998–present
- Label: Virgin
- Website: www.raymzter.nl

Raymond Christiaan Rensen a.k.a. Raymzter (born 1979 in Almere) is a Dutch rapper.

== Biography ==
Raymzter was born in Almere to a Moroccan father and a Dutch mother. He developed an interest in hip hop early in life after listening to a Public Enemy album. He started writing lyrics in English but later switched to Dutch. In 2000 he formed a band with Dominiq Dorwart (Dj-Do), Glenn Gaddum, Jason Chocolaad and Rowin Tetteroo, and this group won the first place in the hip hop category at the "Grand Prix of the Netherlands Talent Show". He also won an MC battle, and began making a name for himself in the Dutch hip hop scene.

In 2002, he contributed two songs to a compilation CD, Homegrown - Dope Dutch Hiphop Talent, and in June of the same year won the "Essent Music Award", earning him a gig at Lowlands festival. In September he released his first single, "Kutmarokkanen" ("Cunt Moroccans"). The title refers to Amsterdam alderman Rob Oudkerk's comment on Dutch Moroccans, and the lyrics criticize the country's swing towards right-wing populist politics after 9/11. The song was a national hit and paved the way for other Dutch Moroccan hip hop artists.

Raymzter's full-length debut, Rayalistisch, was released in early 2003, and includes a collaboration with Dutch rapper Brainpower. Raymzter played at the Noorderslag conference, and then for a second consecutive year at the Lowlands festival. Together with D-Men (Lange Frans & Baas B) and Opgezwolle Raymzter performs live in Amsterdam's Melkweg on the Rap4Right night, an educational project for third world youth. Then in March Raymzter presented his second album Rayacties in Bitterzoet, Amsterdam. The album is recorded with producer/DJ Mass (Massimo Baudo). Late June hiphop movie Bolletjes Blues!, in which Raymzter plays a small part, is shot. Fusion flute player Chris Hinze contributes to the single/video Vechten Op Het Schoolplein ('Fighting At The School Yard'). The collaboration leads to a theatre tour by the two, dubbed Serieuzere Zaken ('More Serious Business'), featuring members from their respective bands plus Moroccan singer Rajae El Mouhandiz.

== Discography ==
Albums

- Rayalistisch (2003)
- Rayacties (2005)

Singles

- Kut Marokkanen ??! (2002)
- Altijd Laat (2003)
- Down Met Jou (2003)
- Vechten Op Het Schoolplein (2006)

Compilations

- Homegrown - Dope Dutch Hiphop Talent (2002)
- Bolletjes Blues (2006)
