= Anouk (singer) =

Dutch singer (born 1975)

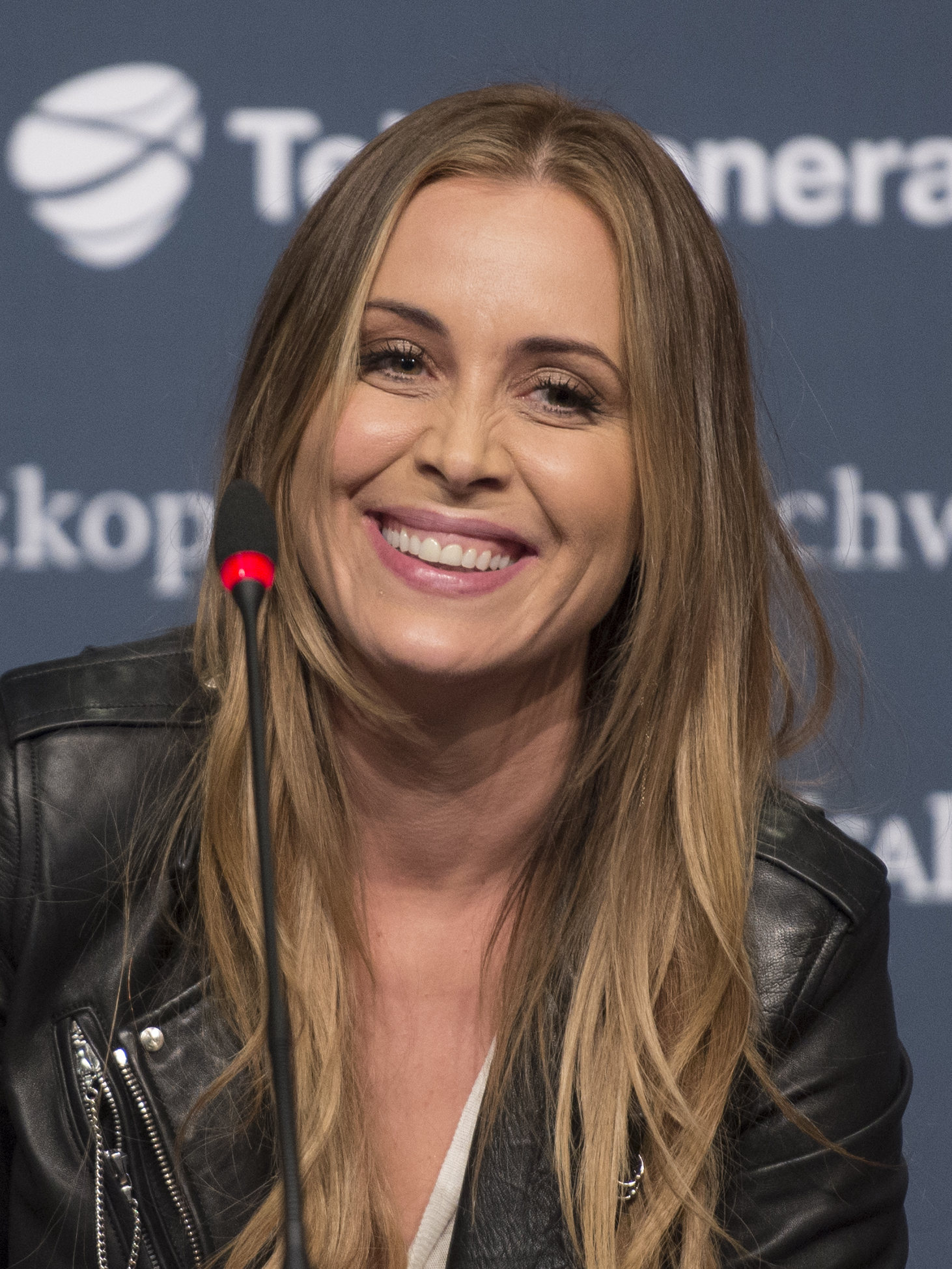
- Anouk in 2013

Background information
- Born: Anouk Teeuwe; 8 April 1975 (age 51); The Hague, Netherlands
- Genres: Alternative rock; pop rock; post-grunge; R&B; soul
- Occupation: Singer
- Years active: 1996–present
- Labels: Goldilox, EMI, Dino
- Website: anouk.com
- Children: 6

Anouk Schemmekes (née Teeuwe; (Note: Dutch pronunciation: [aːˈnuk ˈsxɛməkəs ˈteːu.ə]) born 8 April 1975), professionally known by the mononym Anouk, is a Dutch singer, songwriter and producer. After her 1997 breakthrough rock single "Nobody's Wife", she had additional hit records in the Dutch and Belgian charts. Many of her albums topped the Dutch album charts, all of them going Platinum and several debuting in the number 1 position. Anouk has a total of 15 number 1 albums, the most for any solo artist in the Netherlands. Her most famous singles include "Nobody's Wife", "Michel", "It's So Hard", "R U Kiddin' Me", "Girl", "Lost", "Modern World", "Three Days in a Row", "Birds", and "Woman".

Anouk had released fifteen studio albums by 2025, a mix of anglophonic rock, pop and adult contemporary; one of which was recorded in the U.S., produced by Glen Ballard. In recent years, she has expanded into Dutch, more folky lyrics. Her 2022 album, was titled Trails of Fails.

Anouk represented the Netherlands at the Eurovision Song Contest 2013 in Malmö, Sweden, with the song "Birds". Her song made it to the final – the first time since 2004 for the Netherlands, finished 9th with 114 points, and scored her another big hit.

== Biography ==
=== 1970s to 2000s: Beginnings and breakthrough ===
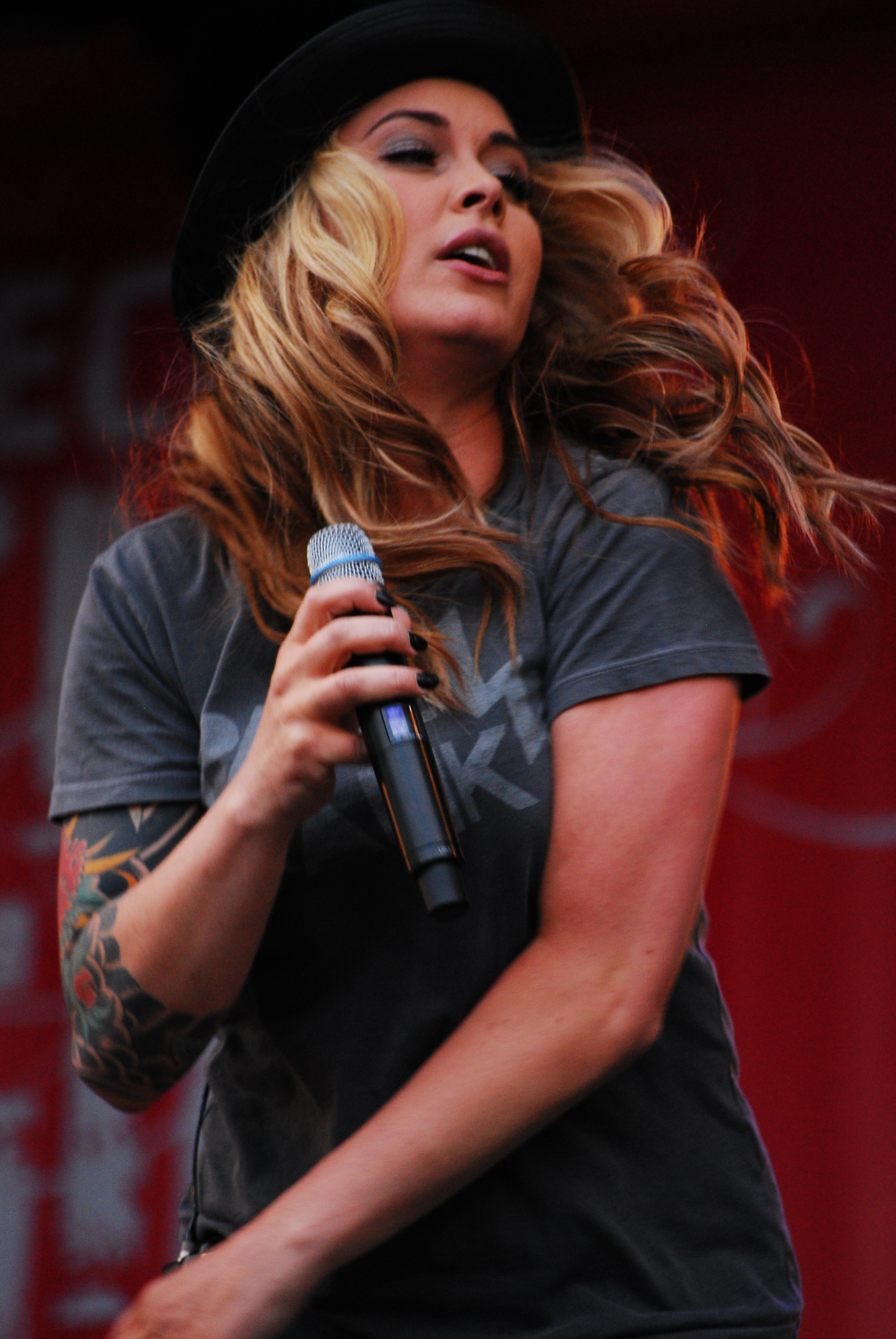
Anouk at Festival Mundial in 2008

Anouk Teeuwe was born on 8 April 1975, in The Hague, Netherlands. As a teenager, she used drugs and ended up living in several care homes after she ran away from her family at the age of fourteen. Anouk's interest in music was triggered through her mother, who was a blues singer. Anouk gave her first performance at fifteen and sang at weddings and parties with the band Shotgun Wedding. She started attending the Rotterdam Conservatory in 1994, but dropped out two years later. In the same period, her then-husband and manager Edwin Jansen introduced Anouk to Golden Earring frontman Barry Hay. Hay believed her to have talent and offered to write some songs for her. One of those songs was "Mood Indigo"; written in collaboration with fellow Golden Earring member George Kooymans.

After she met Bart van Veen, her co-writer, the pair wrote a few songs. On 5 September 1997, she released her second single, "Nobody's Wife", which remained at the top of the Dutch music charts for a number of weeks and was a hit in Norway and Sweden. Her debut album Together Alone turned out to be a huge success. In 1998, Anouk won two awards from Dutch music channel TMF in addition to an Edison Award. During the summer, she played at various festivals. Her second album Urban Solitude was released in November 1999, and included the single "R U Kiddin' Me". This song reached the Dutch Top 100. Shortly afterwards, Anouk went to the United States to pursue a record deal. Negotiations with her American label (Sony) ended badly, causing her to return to the Netherlands without a deal. She released a new song, "Don't", and began touring the Netherlands in February 2001.

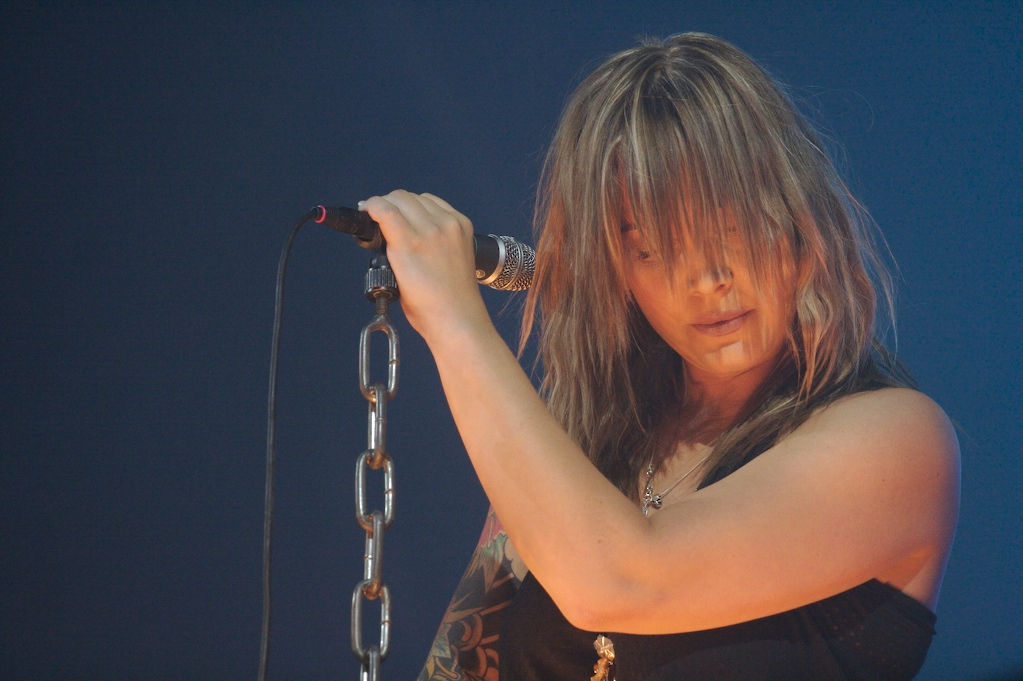
Anouk at Lowlands festival in 2006

In March 2001, she released Lost Tracks, which contained acoustic versions and B-sides from older songs, and various duets with K's Choice singer Sam Bettens and The Anonymous Mis. She was awarded the Popprijs award in 2001. In November 2002, the album Graduated Fool was released. This was the heaviest rock album in Anouk's career so far. Anouk received a Golden Harp in 2003. The following full-length release is called Hotel New York (2004) and yielded a total of four singles: "Girl", "Lost", "Jerusalem" and "One Word". In 2006, she won the 3FM award for best Dutch female singer. In 2007, Anouk released Who's Your Momma, recorded with producer Glen Ballard. The first single, "Good God" was a success, and became a playable song in the video game Guitar Hero World Tour in 2008. In 2009, she released her album For Bitter or Worse. The song "Three Days in a Row" reached the first place in the Dutch charts.

=== 2010s: Eurovision Song Contest participation and subsequent projects ===
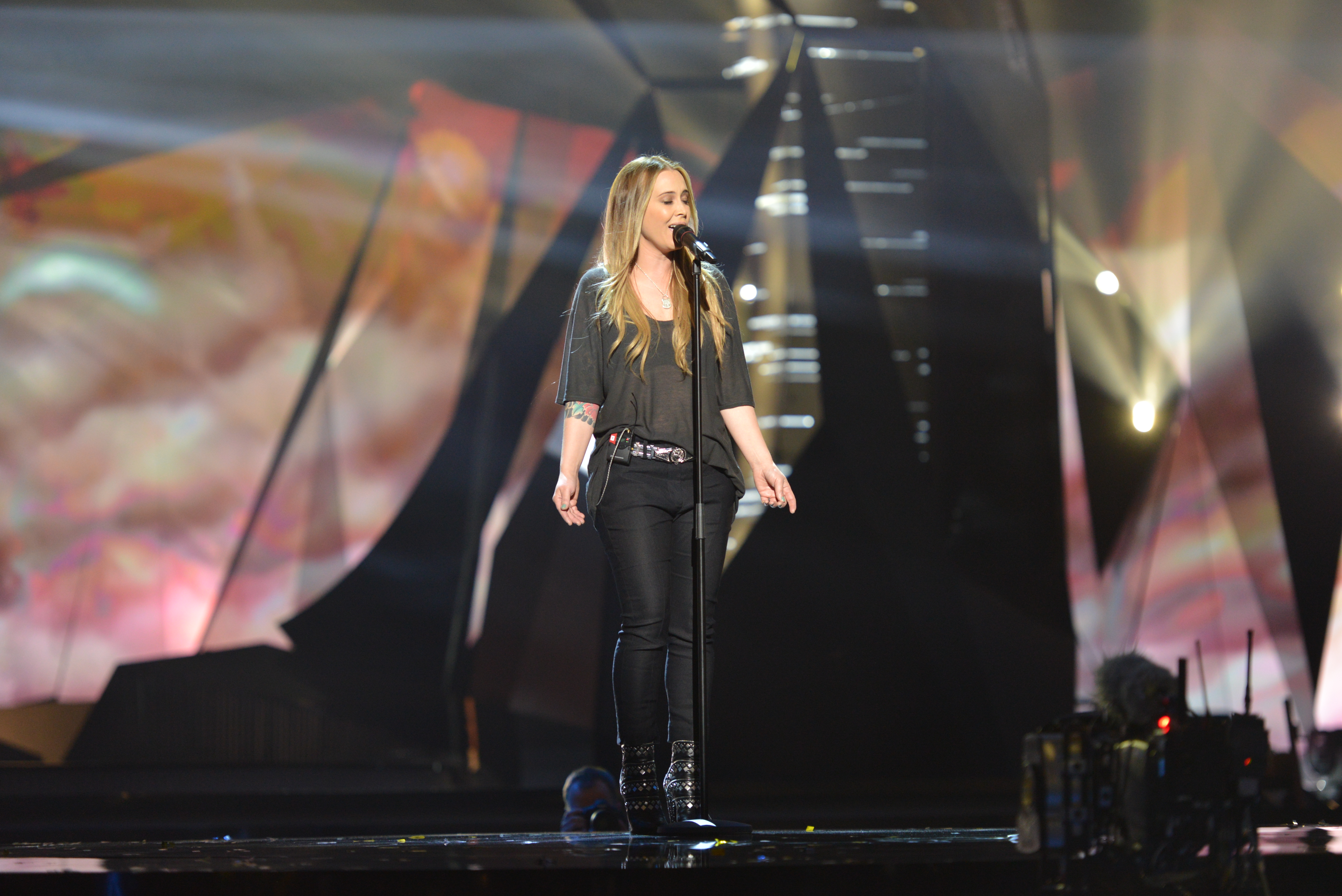
Anouk at the dress rehearsal of the Eurovision Song Contest 2013

Anouk's album To Get Her Together was released in the Netherlands in May 2011. On 28 February 2011 Anouk placed one of the new tracks on YouTube named "Killer Bee". The first single of the album is called "Down & Dirty" and came out in April. On 27 June, Anouk released her single "I'm a Cliché". On 17 September 2011 "Save Me" was released as third single from the album. The fourth single is "What Have You Done".

Anouk performed at the GelreDome in Arnhem for her To Get Her Together Tour on 8 and 11 March 2012.

Anouk first revealed that she would be taking part in the Eurovision Song Contest 2013 on 17 October 2012 via a post on Facebook, after negotiations with broadcaster TROS. Her song was officially revealed on 11 March 2013. Anouk performed "Birds" in the first semi-final on 14 May, where she progressed to the final on 18 May and eventually reached 9th place there with her song "Birds". The Dutch broadly perceived her result to be a major achievement, as it was the best Eurovision result for the Netherlands in 14 years and the first time in 9 years that any Dutch entrant had qualified for the final of the contest. Her backing singer, Shirma Rouse, was named best backing singer by The Eurovision Times. Anouk wrote the 2015 Dutch entry "Walk Along", performed by Trijntje Oosterhuis, along with Swedish songwriter Tobias Karlsson.

Anouk was a coach on The Voice of Holland for seasons 6 and 8 through 12, before resigning in January 2022 as a result of sexual misconduct allegations beleaguering the show. In 2016, Anouk released two albums: Queen for a Day, which included the lead single "Run Away Together", in March and Fake It Till We Die in late October. In 2018, Anouk released her first Dutch-language album Wen d'r maar aan. A few years later in 2022, she released Trails of Fails Anouk's first mini album. It features seven calm singer-songwriter tracks. The songs have a more live band feeling than most of her previous work, most of the parts are recorded in either one or two takes. Her album, Deena & Jim, was released in 2023 and was her fifteenth album to make it to the number 1 position. Her latest album Set this Thing on Fire was released in 2025 in which the singer went back to her rock roots.

== Musical style ==
Anouk's musical style has been described as a combination of Joan Osborne, Melissa Etheridge and Alanis Morissette. She is known for explosive rock songs like "Nobody's Wife" and "R U Kiddin' Me", but has also made small and fragile songs like "Lost" and "Michel". In addition to her pop/rock sound she has also experimented with soul, funk and hip hop, as well as blues, acoustic ballads, alternative pop, and Dutch-language pop.

== Personal life ==
Anouk has six children. She was married to her manager, Edwin Jansen, until 1998. She married Remon Stotijn (aka the Anonymous Mis), frontman of the reggae/rap band Postmen, on 16 March 2004. Stotijn is the father of three of her children. In May 2008, Anouk and Remon announced a "harmonious" mutual separation. Anouk has two other children, born in 2010 and 2014. In June 2016, she gave birth to her sixth child, a girl, with mixed martial artist and former basketball player Dominique Schemmekes, whom she married in June 2022.

In 2013, and then again in 2019, Anouk publicly spoke out against the Zwarte Piet holiday tradition, describing it as "racist" and "blackface".

In February 2024, Anouk posted a photo of toilet paper with menstrual blood on Threads, with the caption "Chopping ur peepee off doesn't make you a woman. But this will". The post was criticized by many as transphobic and trans-exclusionary feminist. Anouk refused to apologise for the remark, stating that "anyone you lose by speaking facts isn't a loss". In April 2024, Anouk was criticised for directing the word "nigga" in response to Dutch rapper Ronnie Flex.

== Discography ==
- Together Alone (1997)
- Urban Solitude (1999)
- Graduated Fool (2002)
- Hotel New York (2004)
- Who's Your Momma? (2007)
- For Bitter or Worse (2009)
- To Get Her Together (2011)
- Sad Singalong Songs (2013)
- Paradise and Back Again (2014)
- Queen for a Day (2016)
- Fake It Till We Die (2016)
- Wen d'r maar aan (2018)
- Trails of Fails (2022)
- Deena & Jim (2023)
- Set This Thing on Fire (2025)

== Awards and nominations ==
Dutch TMF Awards

Year	Nominated work	Award	Result
1998	"Nobody's Wife"	Best New Single	Won
1998	Herself	Best Newcoming Act	Won
2000	"R U Kiddin' me"	Best Single	Won
2000	Herself	Best Female	Won
2000	Herself	Best Live Act	Won
2000	"The Dark"	Best Videoclip	Won
2003	Herself	Best Female	Won
2005	Herself	Best Female National	Won
2005		Best Videoclip	Nominated
2005	Herself	Artist of the Decade	Nominated
2006	Herself	Best Female National	Won
2006	Herself	Best Rock Act	Won
2006	"DownHill" (Postmen feat. Anouk)	Best Video	Won

In 2006, Dutch singer Marco Borsato joined Anouk in announcing their withdrawal from future TMF Awards-nominations. "Every year the same faces can get boring".

Edison Awards

Year	Nominated work	Award	Result
1998	"Nobody's Wife"	Best Videoclip	Won
1998	Herself	Best New Artist	Won
1998	Herself	Best Female Artist	Won
2000	Herself	Best Female Artist (Public vote)	Won
2000	Herself	Best Artist (Jury vote)	Won
2001	"Michel"	Best Single	Won
2003	Herself	Best Dutch Female	Won
2006	Herself	Best Dutch Female	Won
2011	Herself	Best Female Artist	Won
2011	To Get Her Together	Best Album	Nominated
2011	"Down & Dirty"	Best Song	Nominated

3FM Radio Awards

Year	Nominated work	Award	Result
2005	Herself	Best Female	Won
2005	"Girl"	Best Single	Won
2005	Herself	Best Musician Voted by Colleagues	Won
2006	Herself	Best Female Singer	Won
2008	Herself	Best Female Singer	Won
2008	Herself	Best Rock Artist	Won
2008	Who's Your Momma	Best Album	Won
2010	Herself	Best Female Singer	Won
2010	For Bitter or Worse	Best Album	Won
2011	Herself	Best Live Act	Won

Belgian TMF Awards

Year	Nominated work	Award	Result
2005	Herself	Best International Female Artist	Won
2005	Hotel New York	Best International Album	Won
2005	"Girl"	Best International Video	Won
2006	Herself	Best International Live Act	Won
2006	Herself	Best International Female Artist	Nominated

MTV Europe Music Awards

Year	Nominated work	Award	Result
2005	Herself	Best Dutch/Belgian Act	Won
2006	Herself	Best Dutch Act	Won

Other Awards

- Noorderslag Popprijs 2001
- Golden Harp 2003
- Two medals (best female and single international "Girl") on Humo's Pop Poll 2005 Belgium
- Duiveltje 2004 (best female singer)

Awards and achievements
Preceded by Joan Franka with "You and Me"	Netherlands in the Eurovision Song Contest; 2013	Succeeded by The Common Linnets with "Calm After the Storm"
