= List of artists who reached number one on the Dutch Top 40 =

This is a list of number-one singles in the Dutch Top 40. The Dutch Top 40 is a chart that ranks the best-performing singles of the Netherlands since 1965. It is published weekly by radio station Radio 538. In this article, an alphabetical list of the number-one singles in order of performing artist(s) can be found.

Artist	Nationality	Single	Weeks at No. 1	Year
112	United States	"I'll Be Missing You"	9 weeks	1997
2 Brothers on the 4th Floor	Netherlands	"Dreams (Will Come Alive)"	4 weeks	1994
2 Live Crew	United States	"Me So Horny"	2 weeks	1990
2 Unlimited	Belgium	"Twilight Zone"	2 weeks	1992
2 Unlimited	Belgium	"No Limit"	5 weeks	1993
2 Unlimited	Belgium	"The Real Thing"	2 weeks	1994
220 Kid	United Kingdom	"Wellerman"	4 weeks	2021
4 Non Blondes	United States	"What's Up?"	10 weeks	1993
Artist	Nationality	Single	Weeks at No. 1	Year
ABBA	Sweden	"Fernando"	3 weeks	1976
ABBA	Sweden	"Dancing Queen"	5 weeks	1976
ABBA	Sweden	"Money, Money, Money"	2 weeks	1976
ABBA	Sweden	"Chiquitita"	1 week	1979
ABBA	Sweden	"I Have a Dream"	3 weeks	1980
ABBA	Sweden	"The Winner Takes It All"	6 weeks	1980
ABBA	Sweden	"Super Trouper"	2 weeks	1980
ABBA	Sweden	"One of Us"	2 weeks	1981
Abel	Netherlands	"Onderweg"	6 weeks	2000
Bryan Adams	Canada	"(Everything I Do) I Do It for You"	11 weeks	1991
Adele	United Kingdom	"Hello"	5 Weeks	2015
Adele	United Kingdom	"Rolling in the Deep"	7 weeks	2011
Adele	United Kingdom	"Set Fire to the Rain"	1 week	2011
Adele	United Kingdom	"Skyfall"	7 weeks	2012
Adele	United Kingdom	"Easy On Me"	8 Weeks	2021
The Adventures of Stevie V	United Kingdom	"Dirty Cash (Money Talks)"	3 weeks	1990
Afrojack	Netherlands	"Give Me Everything" (with Pitbull, Ne-Yo and Nayer)	2 weeks	2011
Christina Aguilera	United States	"Moves Like Jagger" (with Maroon 5)	3 weeks	2011
A-ha	Norway	"Take On Me"	1 week	1985
Akon	United States	"Lonely"	5 weeks	2005
All-4-One	United States	"I Swear"	1 week	1994
Mark Ambor	United States	"Belong Together"	2 weeks	2024
Anarchic System	France	"Popcorn"	7 weeks	1972
Anouk	Netherlands	"Three Days in a Row"	4 weeks	2009
Antoon	Netherlands	"Hallo"	4 weeks	2022
Aphrodite's Child	Greece	"I Want to Live"	1 week	1969
Aqua	Denmark	"Barbie Girl"	1 week	1997
Geike Arnaert	Belgium	"Zoutelande"	10 weeks	2018
Artiesten voor Azië	Netherlands	"Als je iets kan doen"	4 weeks	2005
Rick Astley	United Kingdom	"Never Gonna Give You Up"	4 weeks	1987
Atomic Kitten	United Kingdom	"Whole Again"	1 week	2001
Asaf Avidan	Israel	"One Day / Reckoning Song (Wankelmut Rmx)"	6 weeks	2012
Ava Max	United States	"The Motto"	3 weeks	2022
Avicii	Sweden	"Wake Me Up"	11 weeks	2013
Avicii	Sweden	"Hey Brother"	4 weeks	2013
Avicii	Sweden	"SOS"	3 weeks	2019
Artist	Nationality	Single	Weeks at No. 1	Year
Kenny B	Netherlands	"Parijs"	7 weeks	2015
Ali B	Netherlands	"Wat zou je doen" (with Marco Borsato)	2 weeks	2004
Baccara	Spain	"Yes Sir, I Can Boogie"	3 weeks	1977
Baccara	Spain	"Sorry, I'm a Lady"	1 week	1977
Backstreet Boys	United States	"I Want It That Way"	4 weeks	1999
Philip Bailey	United States	"Easy Lover" (with Phil Collins)	4 weeks	1985
George Baker Selection	Netherlands	"Sing a Song of Love"	3 weeks	1974
George Baker Selection	Netherlands	"Paloma Blanca"	3 weeks	1975
George Baker Selection	Netherlands	"Morning Sky"	2 weeks	1975
Baltimora	Italy	"Tarzan Boy"	2 weeks	1985
J Balvin	Colombia	"Mi Gente"	5 Weeks	2017
Band Aid	(Republic of Ireland) / (United Kingdom)	"Do They Know It's Christmas?"	3 weeks	1984
The Bangles	United States	"Walk Like an Egyptian"	5 weeks	1986–87
The Bangles	United States	"Eternal Flame"	7 weeks	1989
Barry & Eileen	United Kingdom	"If You Go"	3 weeks	1975
Basshunter	Sweden	"Boten Anna"	2 weeks	2006
Frans Bauer	Netherlands	"De regenboog" (with Marianne Weber)	3 weeks	1997
Frans Bauer	Netherlands	"Heb je even voor mij"	2 weeks	2003
The Beach Boys	United States	"Sloop John B"	4 weeks	1966
The Beatles	United Kingdom	"I Feel Fine"	5 weeks	1965
The Beatles	United Kingdom	"Rock and Roll Music" / "No Reply"	3 weeks	1965
The Beatles	United Kingdom	"Ticket to Ride"	9 weeks	1965
The Beatles	United Kingdom	"Help!"	6 weeks	1965
The Beatles	United Kingdom	"Yesterday"	6 weeks	1965
The Beatles	United Kingdom	"We Can Work It Out" / "Day Tripper"	7 weeks	1965–66
The Beatles	United Kingdom	"Michelle" (with The Overlanders)	5 weeks	1966
The Beatles	United Kingdom	"Paperback Writer"	2 weeks	1966
The Beatles	United Kingdom	"Yellow Submarine" / "Eleanor Rigby"	6 weeks	1966
The Beatles	United Kingdom	"Penny Lane" / "Strawberry Fields Forever"	4 weeks	1967
The Beatles	United Kingdom	"All You Need Is Love"	3 weeks	1967
The Beatles	United Kingdom	"Hello, Goodbye"	4 weeks	1967–68
The Beatles	United Kingdom	"Hey Jude"	7 weeks	1968
The Beatles	United Kingdom	"Get Back" (with Billy Preston)	2 weeks	1969
The Beatles	United Kingdom	"The Ballad of John and Yoko"	4 weeks	1969
The Beatles	United Kingdom	"Let It Be"	1 week	1970
Robin Beck	United States	"First Time"	1 week	1989
Bee Gees	United Kingdom	"Massachusetts"	3 weeks	1967
Bee Gees	United Kingdom	"World"	3 weeks	1968
Bee Gees	United Kingdom	"Words"	3 weeks	1968
Bee Gees	United Kingdom	"Don't Forget to Remember"	2 weeks	1969
Bee Gees	United Kingdom	"Stayin' Alive"	3 weeks	1978
Lou Bega	Germany	"Mambo No. 5 (A Little Bit Of...)"	4 weeks	1999
Pat Benatar	United States	"Love Is a Battlefield"	4 weeks	1984
Yves Berendse	Netherlands	"Terug in de tijd"	6 weeks	2024
Berlin	United States	"Take My Breath Away"	1 week	1986
Jody Bernal	Netherlands	"Que si, que no"	5 weeks	2000
Dave Berry	United Kingdom	"This Strange Effect"	3 weeks	1965
Beyoncé	United States	"Beautiful Liar" (with Shakira)	3 weeks	2007
Beyoncé	United States	"If I Were a Boy"	4 weeks	2008
Beyoncé	United States	"Perfect"	9 weeks	2017–2018
Beyoncé	United States	"Mi Gente"	3 weeks	2017
Justin Bieber	Canada	"What Do You Mean?"	6 weeks	2015
Justin Bieber	Canada	"Sorry"	5 weeks	2015
Justin Bieber	Canada	"Love Yourself"	3 weeks	2015
Justin Bieber	Canada	"Cold Water" (with Major Lazer & MØ)	6 Weeks	2016
Justin Bieber	Canada	"Let Me Love You" (with DJ Snake)	5 Weeks	2016
Justin Bieber	Canada	"Despacito" (with Luis Fonsi & Daddy Yankee)	15 Weeks	2017
Justin Bieber	Canada	"Stay" (with The Kid Laroi)	6 Weeks	2021
Billen Ted	United Kingdom	"Wellerman"	4 weeks	2021
Aloe Blacc	United States	"SOS"	3 weeks	2019
The Black Eyed Peas	United States	"Where Is the Love?"	2 weeks	2003
The Black Eyed Peas	United States	"Mas que Nada" (with Sérgio Mendes)	2 weeks	2006
The Black Eyed Peas	United States	"I Gotta Feeling"	2 weeks	2009
BLØF	Netherlands	"Holiday in Spain" (with Counting Crows)	5 weeks	2004
BLØF	Netherlands	"Zoutelande"	10 Weeks	2018
Blondie	United States	"Denis"	3 weeks	1978
Blue	United Kingdom	"Sorry Seems to Be the Hardest Word" (with Elton John)	5 weeks	2003
Blue Cheer	United States	"Summertime Blues"	1 week	1968
James Blunt	United Kingdom	"You're Beautiful"	4 weeks	2005
B.o.B	United States	"Nothin' on You" (with Bruno Mars)	2 weeks	2010
Andrea Bocelli	Italy	"Because We Believe" (with Marco Borsato)	6 weeks	2006
Bomfunk MC's	Finland	"Freestyler"	5 weeks	2000
Bon Jovi	United States	"It's My Life"	2 weeks	2000
Boney M.	Germany	"Sunny"	1 week	1977
Boney M.	Germany	"Ma Baker"	6 weeks	1977
Boney M.	Germany	"Rivers of Babylon" / "Brown Girl in the Ring"	9 weeks	1978
Boney M.	Germany	"Hooray! Hooray! It's a Holi-Holiday"	3 weeks	1979
Jeroen van der Boom	Netherlands	"Jij bent zo"	2 weeks	2007
Jeroen van der Boom	Netherlands	"Eén Wereld"	2 weeks	2007
Boris	Netherlands	"When You Think of Me"	3 weeks	2004
Marco Borsato	Netherlands	"Dromen zijn bedrog"	12 weeks	1994
Marco Borsato	Netherlands	"Waarom nou jij"	1 week	1995
Marco Borsato	Netherlands	"De bestemming"	3 weeks	1998
Marco Borsato	Netherlands	"Binnen"	3 weeks	1999–2000
Marco Borsato	Netherlands	"Lopen op het water" (with Sita)	4 weeks	2002
Marco Borsato	Netherlands	"Afscheid nemen bestaat niet"	8 weeks	2003–04
Marco Borsato	Netherlands	"Voorbij" (with Do)	3 weeks	2004
Marco Borsato	Netherlands	"Wat zou je doen" (with Ali B)	2 weeks	2004
Marco Borsato	Netherlands	"Because We Believe" (with Andrea Bocelli)	6 weeks	2006
Marco Borsato	Netherlands	"Rood"	11 weeks	2006
Marco Borsato	Netherlands	"Everytime I Think of You" (with Lucie Silvas)	5 weeks	2006
Marco Borsato	Netherlands	"Wit licht"	3 weeks	2008
Marco Borsato	Netherlands	"Stop de tijd"	3 weeks	2008
Marco Borsato	Netherlands	"Dochters"	3 weeks	2008
Marco Borsato	Netherlands	"Hoe het danst"	3 weeks	2019
David Bowie	United Kingdom	"Under Pressure" (with Queen)	1 week	1981
David Bowie	United Kingdom	"Let's Dance"	2 weeks	1983
David Bowie	United Kingdom	"This Is Not America" (with Pat Metheny Group)	2 weeks	1985
David Bowie	United Kingdom	"Dancing in the Street" (with Mick Jagger)	2 weeks	1985
David Bowie	United Kingdom	"Tonight (Live)" (with Tina Turner)	4 weeks	1989
Boys Town Gang	United States	"Can't Take My Eyes Off You"	3 weeks	1982
Boyz II Men	United States	"End of the Road"	3 weeks	1992
Boyzone	(Republic of Ireland)	"No Matter What"	7 weeks	1998
Brainpower	Netherlands	"Dansplaat"	4 weeks	2002
Brandy	United States	"The Boy Is Mine" (with Monica)	3 weeks	1998
Freddy Breck	Germany	"Rote Rosen"	4 weeks	1973
Bronski Beat	United Kingdom	"Smalltown Boy"	2 weeks	1984
Herman Brood	Netherlands	"My Way"	2 weeks	2001
Brotherhood of Man	United Kingdom	"Save Your Kisses for Me"	2 weeks	1976
Sam Brown	United Kingdom	"Stop!"	3 Weeks	1988
Bucks Fizz	United Kingdom	"Making Your Mind Up"	2 weeks	1981
Bucks Fizz	United Kingdom	"The Land of Make Believe"	2 weeks	1982
Burna Boy	Nigeria	"Dai Dai"	15 Weeks	2026
BZN	Netherlands	"Mon Amour"	5 weeks	1976
BZN	Netherlands	"Pearlydumm"	1 week	1980
Artist	Nationality	Single	Weeks at No. 1	Year
Melanie C	United Kingdom	"Never Be the Same Again" (with Lisa 'Left Eye' Lopes)	2 weeks	2000
Melanie C	United Kingdom	"I Turn to You"	4 weeks	2000
Camila Cabello	United States	"Señorita"	12 weeks	2019
Candyman	United States	"Knockin' Boots"	2 weeks	1991
Cappella	Italy	"Move on Baby"	2 weeks	1994
Captain Jack	Germany	"Captain Jack"	4 weeks	1996
Captain Jack	Germany	"Drill Instructor"	3 weeks	1996
Irene Cara	United States	"Fame"	3 weeks	1983
Mariah Carey	United States	"I'll Be There" (with Trey Lorenz)	2 weeks	1992
Mariah Carey	United States	"Without You"	6 weeks	1994
Cascada	Germany	"Evacuate the Dancefloor"	2 weeks	2009
The Cats	Netherlands	"Lea"	2 weeks	1968
The Cats	Netherlands	"Why"	5 weeks	1969
The Cats	Netherlands	"Marian"	5 weeks	1969–70
The Cats	Netherlands	"Where Have I Been Wrong"	2 weeks	1970
The Cats	Netherlands	"Be My Day"	6 weeks	1974
The Chainsmokers	United States	"Closer"	4 weeks	2016
Champaign	United States	"How 'Bout Us"	8 weeks	1981
Tracy Chapman	United States	"Fast Car"	2 weeks	1988
Cheap Trick	United States	"I Want You to Want Me"	2 weeks	1979
Cher	United States	"Believe"	1 week	1999
Neneh Cherry	Sweden	"Buffalo Stance"	2 weeks	1989
Chicago	United States	"If You Leave Me Now"	4 weeks	1976–77
Ch!pz	Netherlands	"Cowboy"	3 weeks	2003
Ch!pz	Netherlands	"1001 Arabian Nights"	4 weeks	2004
Ch!pz	Netherlands	"One, Two, Three!"	3 weeks	2005
Ch!pz	Netherlands	"Carnival"	2 weeks	2005
Cidinho & Doca	Brazil	"Rap das Armas (Quintino Remix)"	2 weeks	2009
City to City	Netherlands	"The Road Ahead (Miles of the Unknown)"	4 weeks	1999
Petula Clark	United Kingdom	"This Is My Song"	4 weeks	1967
Kelly Clarkson	United States	"Because of You"	2 weeks	2006
Claude	(Republic of the Congo) /	"Ladada (Mon dernier mot)"	6 weeks	2022–23
Claude	(Republic of the Congo) /	"C'est la vie"	1 Week	2025
Clean Bandit	United Kingdom	"Rather Be"	11 weeks	2014
Clean Bandit	United Kingdom	"Rockabye"	5 weeks	2016/2017
Julien Clerc	France	"This Melody"	1 week	1976
Clouseau	Belgium	"Passie"	1 week	1995
Cock Robin	United States	"The Promise You Made"	2 weeks	1986
Coldplay	United Kingdom	"Talk"	4 weeks	2005–06
Coldplay	United Kingdom	"Viva la Vida"	3 weeks	2008
Dave and Ansell Collins	Jamaica	"Double Barrel"	3 weeks	1971
Phil Collins	United Kingdom	"In the Air Tonight"	3 weeks	1981
Phil Collins	United Kingdom	"You Can't Hurry Love"	2 weeks	1983
Phil Collins	United Kingdom	"Easy Lover" (with Philip Bailey)	4 weeks	1985
Phil Collins	United Kingdom	"A Groovy Kind of Love"	1 week	1988
Chi Coltrane	United States	"Go Like Elijah"	3 weeks	1973
Commodores	United States	"Nightshift"	3 weeks	1985
The Communards	United Kingdom	"Don't Leave Me This Way" (with Sarah Jane Morris)	5 weeks	1986
Conkarah	Jamaica	"Banana"	5 weeks	2020
Sam Cooke	United States	"Wonderful World"	4 weeks	1986
Coole Piet	Netherlands	"Paniek in de confettiefabriek"	1 week	2006
Coolio	United States	"Gangsta's Paradise" (with L.V.)	5 weeks	1995
Joel Corry	United Kingdom	"Head & Heart"	5 weeks	2020
Counting Crows	United States	"Holiday in Spain" (with BLØF)	5 weeks	2004
Julie Covington	United Kingdom	"Don't Cry for Me Argentina"	4 weeks	1977
Gerard Cox	Netherlands	"'t Is weer voorbij die mooie zomer"	5 weeks	1973–74
Billy Crawford	United States	"Trackin'"	3 weeks	2002
Randy Crawford	United States	"One Day I'll Fly Away"	2 weeks	1980
Creedence Clearwater Revival	United States	"Who'll Stop the Rain"	2 weeks	1970
Creedence Clearwater Revival	United States	"Up Around the Bend"	2 weeks	1970
Culture Beat	Germany	"Mr. Vain"	1 week	1993
Culture Club	United Kingdom	"Karma Chameleon"	1 week	1983
Alexander Curly	Netherlands	"I'll Never Drink Again"	2 weeks	1972
Alexander Curly	Netherlands	"Guus"	3 weeks	1975
Cyril	Australia	"Stumblin' In"	6 Weeks	2024
Miley Cyrus	United States	"Flowers"	16 weeks	2023
Artist	Nationality	Single	Weeks at No. 1	Year
Doris D & The Pins	/ (United Kingdom)	"Shine Up"	2 Weeks	1981
Gigi D'Agostino	Italy	"L'amour toujours"	4 Weeks	2001–02
Daft Punk	France	"Starboy"	4 Weeks	2016
Damaru	Suriname	"Mi rowsu (tuintje in mijn hart)" (with Jan Smit)	3 Weeks	2009
Terence Trent D'Arby	United States	"Wishing Well"	1 Week	1987
Dave	Netherlands	"Dansez Maintenant"	2 Weeks	1975
Sammy Davis Jr.	United States	"Baretta's Theme"	3 Weeks	1976
Dawn	United States	"Tie a Yellow Ribbon Round the Ole Oak Tree"	2 Weeks	1973
Taylor Dayne	United States	"Tell It to My Heart"	1 Week	1988
DCUP	Australia	"We No Speak Americano" (with Yolanda Be Cool)	8 Weeks	2010
De La Soul	United States	"Me Myself and I"	2 Weeks	1989
Olivia Dean	United Kingdom	"Man I Need"	9 Weeks	2025
Sharif Dean	France	"Do You Love Me?"	5 Weeks	1973
Desmond Dekker & The Aces	Jamaica	"Israelites"	2 Weeks	1969
Roxy Dekker	Netherlands	"Sugardaddy"	5 Weeks	2024
Roxy Dekker	Netherlands	"Gaan we weg?"	2 Weeks	2024
Ilse DeLange	Netherlands	"Miracle"	2 Weeks	2009
Jason Derulo	United States	"Savage Love (Laxed – Siren Beat)"	5 Weeks	2020
Des'ree	United Kingdom	"Life"	5 Weeks	1998
Dillinger	Jamaica	"Cokane in My Brain"	4 Weeks	1977
Céline Dion	Canada	"Think Twice"	3 Weeks	1995
Céline Dion	Canada	"Tell Him" (with Barbra Streisand)	2 Weeks	1997–1998
Céline Dion	Canada	"My Heart Will Go On"	10 Weeks	1998
Dire Straits	United Kingdom	"Private Investigations"	4 Weeks	1982
Disciples	United Kingdom	"How Deep Is Your Love"	2 Weeks	2015
DJ Jean	Netherlands	"The Launch"	2 Weeks	1999
DJ Goja	(Brazil)	"Mi Chico"	2 Weeks	2026
DJ Snake	France	"Let Me Love You"	5 Weeks	2016
Do	Netherlands	"Voorbij" (with Marco Borsato)	3 Weeks	2004
Doe Maar	Netherlands	"De bom"	4 Weeks	1982
Doe Maar	Netherlands	"Pa"	2 Weeks	1983
DÖF	/ (Germany)	"Codo (...Düse im Sauseschritt)"	2 Weeks	1983
Dolly Dots	Netherlands	"Love Me Just a Little Bit More (Totally Hooked On You)"	1 Week	1984
Don Omar	Puerto Rico	"Danza Kuduro" (with Lucenzo)	7 Weeks	2011
Donovan	United Kingdom	"Atlantis"	3 Weeks	1969
Double You	Italy	"Please Don't Go"	2 Weeks	1992
Carl Douglas	Jamaica	"Kung Fu Fighting"	6 Weeks	1974
Clementine Douglas	United Kingdom	"Blessings"	3 Weeks	2025
Egbert Douwe	Netherlands	"Kom uit de bedstee mijn liefste"	1 Week	1968
Dr. Alban	Sweden	"It's My Life"	7 Weeks	1992
Dragonette	Canada	"Hello" (with Martin Solveig)	4 Weeks	2011
Drake	Canada	"One Dance"	6 Weeks	2016
Drake	Canada	"In My Feelings"	1 Week	2018
Drukwerk	Netherlands	"Je loog tegen mij"	2 Weeks	1982
Duffy	United Kingdom	"Mercy"	2 Weeks	2008
André van Duin	Netherlands	"Willempie"	3 Weeks	1976
André van Duin	Netherlands	"Als je huilt" / "Bim bam"	4 Weeks	1982
André van Duin	Netherlands	"Het pizzalied (effe wachte...)"	3 Weeks	1993–1994
The Dukes	Netherlands	"Friday on My Mind" (with The Easybeats)	2 Weeks	1966
Candy Dulfer	Netherlands	"Lily Was Here" (with David A. Stewart)	5 Weeks	1989
Duran Duran	United Kingdom	"The Reflex"	6 Weeks	1984
Dutch Swing College Band	Netherlands	"Letkis Jenka" (with Gudrun Jankis Orchestra and Stig Rauno)	3 Weeks	1965
Frank Duval & Orchestra	Germany	"Angel of Mine"	2 Weeks	1981
DVBBS	(Canada)	"Tsunami"	2 Weeks	2013
Joey Dyser	Netherlands	"100 Years"	3 Weeks	1975
Artist	Nationality	Single	Weeks at No. 1	Year
Eamon	United States	"Fuck It (I Don't Want You Back)"	4 weeks	2004
Earth and Fire	Netherlands	"Memories"	2 weeks	1972
Earth and Fire	Netherlands	"Weekend"	3 weeks	1979–80
Sheena Easton	United Kingdom	"For Your Eyes Only"	2 weeks	1981
The Easybeats	Australia	"Friday on My Mind" (with The Dukes)	2 weeks	1966
Eiffel 65	Italy	"Blue (Da Ba Dee)"	5 weeks	1999
Electric Light Orchestra	United Kingdom	"Xanadu" (with Olivia Newton-John)	3 weeks	1980
Emilia	Sweden	"Big Big World"	4 weeks	1998–99
Eminem	United States	"Without Me"	2 weeks	2002
Eminem	United States	"Lose Yourself"	4 weeks	2003
Enigma	Germany	"Sadeness (Part I)"	1 week	1990
Enya	(Republic of Ireland)	"Orinoco Flow (Sail Away)"	3 weeks	1988
Enya	(Republic of Ireland)	"I Don't Wanna Know" (with Mario Winans and P. Diddy)	1 week	2004
Gloria Estefan	United States	"Can't Stay Away from You" (with Miami Sound Machine)	2 weeks	1989
Europe	Sweden	"The Final Countdown"	4 weeks	1986
Faith Evans	United States	"I'll Be Missing You" (with Puff Daddy and 112)	9 weeks	1997
Nathan Evans	United Kingdom	"Wellerman"	4 weeks	2021
Extreme	United States	"More Than Words"	1 week	1991
George Ezra	United Kingdom	"Shotgun"	2 weeks	2018
Artist	Nationality	Single	Weeks at No. 1	Year
Faithless	United Kingdom	"God Is a DJ"	1 week	1998
Falco	Austria	"Jeanny"	2 weeks	1986
Harold Faltermeyer	Germany	"Axel F"	2 weeks	1985
Georgie Fame	United Kingdom	"Rosetta" (with Alan Price)	1 week	1971
Ferrari	Netherlands	"Sweet Love"	1 week	1976
Tiziano Ferro	Italy	"Perdono"	5 weeks	2002
Scott Fitzgerald	United Kingdom	"If I Had Words" (with Yvonne Keeley)	6 weeks	1978
Fifth Harmony	United States	"Work from Home" (featuring Ty Dolla Sign)	1 week	2016
Fleetwood Mac	United Kingdom	"Oh Well"	4 weeks	1969
Fleetwood Mac	United Kingdom	"Go Your Own Way"	3 weeks	1977
Ronnie Flex	Netherlands	"Drank & Drugs"	3 weeks	2015
Ronnie Flex	Netherlands	"Gaan we weg?"	2 Weeks	2024
Fluitsma & Van Tijn	Netherlands	"15 miljoen mensen"	2 weeks	1996
Ellen Foley	United States	"We Belong to the Night"	3 weeks	1979
Luis Fonsi	Puerto Rico	"Despacito" (with Daddy Yankee and Justin Bieber)	15 weeks	2017
Foxy	United States	"Get Off"	2 weeks	1978
Peter Frampton	United Kingdom	"Show Me the Way"	1 week	1976
Frankie Goes to Hollywood	United Kingdom	"Two Tribes"	3 weeks	1984
Aretha Franklin	United States	"I Knew You Were Waiting (For Me)" (with George Michael)	3 weeks	1987
Frenna	Netherlands	"Verleden tijd"	6 weeks	2018
René Froger	Netherlands	"Alles kan een mens gelukkig maken" (with Het Goede Doel)	3 weeks	1989
Fugees	United States	"Killing Me Softly"	6 weeks	1996
Nelly Furtado	Canada	"All Good Things (Come to an End)" (with Chris Martin)	2 weeks	2007
Artist	Nationality	Single	Weeks at No. 1	Year
Galantis	Sweden	"Runaway (U & I)"	1 week	2015
Art Garfunkel	United States	"Bright Eyes"	5 weeks	1979
Siedah Garrett	United States	"I Just Can't Stop Loving You" (with Michael Jackson)	4 weeks	1987
Gareth Gates	United Kingdom	"Anyone of Us (Stupid Mistake)"	2 weeks	2003
Genesis	United Kingdom	"I Can't Dance"	2 weeks	1992
Niels Geusebroek	Netherlands	"Take Your Time Girl"	2 weeks	2013
Robin Gibb	United Kingdom	"Saved by the Bell"	1 week	1969
Gibson Brothers	France	"Non Stop Dance"	2 weeks	1977
Jim Gilstrap	United States	"Swing Your Daddy"	2 weeks	1975
Roger Glover & Guests	United Kingdom	"Love Is All"	3 weeks	1975
Het Goede Doel	Netherlands	"Alles kan een mens gelukkig maken" (with René Froger)	3 weeks	1989
Golden Earring	Netherlands	"Dong-Dong-Di-Ki-Di-Gi-Dong"	1 week	1968
Golden Earring	Netherlands	"Back Home"	5 weeks	1970
Golden Earring	Netherlands	"Radar Love"	3 weeks	1973
Golden Earring	Netherlands	"Twilight Zone"	2 weeks	1982
Golden Earring	Netherlands	"When the Lady Smiles"	2 weeks	1984
Gompie	Netherlands	"Alice, Who the Fuck is Alice?"	5 weeks	1995
Goombay Dance Band	Germany	"Sun of Jamaica"	3 weeks	1980
Rijk de Gooyer	Netherlands	"De bostella" (with John Kraaijkamp, Sr.)	2 weeks	1967
Gordon	Netherlands	"Kon ik maar even bij je zijn"	5 weeks	1991
Gotye	Belgium	"Somebody That I Used to Know" (with Kimbra)	3 weeks	2011
Peggy Gou	South Korea	"(It Goes Like) Nanana"	4 weeks	2023
Lukas Graham	Denmark	"7 Years"	2 weeks	2016
Eddy Grant	United Kingdom	"Gimme Hope Jo'anna"	5 weeks	1988
Cee Lo Green	United States	"Fuck You"	3 weeks	2010
Jesse Green	Jamaica	"Nice and Slow"	2 weeks	1976
Green Day	United States	"The Saints Are Coming" (with U2)	2 weeks	2006
Raymond van het Groenewoud	Belgium	"Liefde voor muziek"	3 weeks	1991
Boudewijn de Groot	Netherlands	"Het land van Maas en Waal"	3 weeks	1967
David Guetta	France	"I'm Good (Blue)"	12 weeks	2022
Guillermo & Tropical Danny	Netherlands	"Toppertje!"	2 weeks	2006
Guns N' Roses	United States	"Knockin' on Heaven's Door"	3 weeks	1992
Guys 'n' Dolls	United Kingdom	"You're My World"	3 weeks	1977
Artist	Nationality	Single	Weeks at No. 1	Year
Haddaway	(Trinidad and Tobago)	"What Is Love"	6 Weeks	1993
Hakkûhbar	Netherlands	"Gabbertje"	3 Weeks	1996
Jan Hammer	Czech Republic	"Crockett's Theme"	4 Weeks	1987
Halsey	United States	"Closer"	4 Weeks	2016
Paul Hardcastle	United Kingdom	"19"	3 Weeks	1985
Calvin Harris	United Kingdom	"How Deep Is Your Love"	2 Weeks	2015
Calvin Harris	United Kingdom	"Summer"	2 Weeks	2014
Calvin Harris	United Kingdom	"Blame"	2 Weeks	2014
Calvin Harris	United Kingdom	"One Kiss"	16 Weeks	2018
Calvin Harris	United Kingdom	"Blessings"	3 Weeks	2025
George Harrison	United Kingdom	"My Sweet Lord"	4 Weeks	1971
The Edwin Hawkins Singers	United States	"Oh Happy Day"	2 Weeks	1969
The Edwin Hawkins Singers	United States	"Lay Down (Candles in the Rain)" (with Melanie)	2 Weeks	1970
André Hazes	Netherlands	"Zij gelooft in mij"	2 Weeks	2004
André Hazes	Netherlands	"Blijf bij mij (dit zijn voor mij de allermooiste uren)" (with Gerard Joling)	11 Weeks	2007
André Hazes	Netherlands	"Bedankt mijn vriend" (with André Hazes, Jr.)	3 Weeks	2007
André Hazes, Jr.	Netherlands	"Bedankt mijn vriend" (with André Hazes)	3 Weeks	2007
Heintje	Netherlands	"Ich bau' dir ein Schloss"	10 Weeks	1968
Heintje	Netherlands	"Heidschi Bumbeidschi"	3 Weeks	1968
Jacques Herb	Netherlands	"Manuela" (with De Riwi's)	3 Weeks	1971
Herman's Hermits	United Kingdom	"No Milk Today"	5 Weeks	1966
Toon Hermans	Netherlands	"Mien waar is m'n feestneus"	4 Weeks	1968
Hermes House Band	Netherlands	"I Will Survive (La La La)"	4 Weeks	1994–95
Hero	Netherlands	"Toen ik je zag"	5 Weeks	1997
Ivan Heylen	Belgium	"De wilde boerndochtere"	4 Weeks	1974
Höllenboer	Netherlands	"Het busje komt zo"	5 Weeks	1995
The Hollies	United Kingdom	"The Day That Curly Billy Shot Down Crazy Sam McGee"	2 Weeks	1973
Mart Hoogkamer	Netherlands	"Ik ga zwemmen"	2 Weeks	2021
Mary Hopkin	United Kingdom	"Goodbye"	2 Weeks	1969
Bruce Hornsby and the Range	United States	"The Way It Is"	1 Week	1986
Hot Butter	United States	"Popcorn"	7 Weeks	1972
Whitney Houston	United States	"I Wanna Dance with Somebody (Who Loves Me)"	3 Weeks	1987
Whitney Houston	United States	"I Will Always Love You"	10 Weeks	1992–93
Whitney Houston	United States	"Could I Have This Kiss Forever" (with Enrique Iglesias)	1 Week	2000
Les Humphries Singers	Germany	"To My Father's House"	6 Weeks	1970
Chrissie Hynde	United States	"I Got You Babe" (with UB40)	1 week	1985
Artist	Nationality	Single	Weeks at No. 1	Year
Enrique Iglesias	Spain	"El Perdón	6 weeks	2015
Enrique Iglesias	Spain	"Can You Hear Me"	2 weeks	2008
Enrique Iglesias	Spain	"Could I Have This Kiss Forever" (with Whitney Houston)	1 week	2000
Julio Iglesias	Spain	"Un Canto A Galicia"	1 week	1972
Julio Iglesias	Spain	"Quiéreme Mucho"	5 weeks	1979
Inner Circle	Jamaica	"Sweat (A La La La La Long)"	5 weeks	1992
Artist	Nationality	Single	Weeks at No. 1	Year
Janet Jackson	United States	"What Have You Done for Me Lately"	3 weeks	1986
Janet Jackson	United States	"Together Again"	3 weeks	1998
Jermaine Jackson	United States	"When the Rain Begins to Fall" (with Pia Zadora)	4 weeks	1984
Michael Jackson	United States	"One Day in Your Life"	4 weeks	1981
Michael Jackson	United States	"Beat It"	4 weeks	1983
Michael Jackson	United States	"Wanna Be Startin' Somethin'"	2 Weeks	1983
Michael Jackson	United States	"I Just Can't Stop Loving You" (with Siedah Garrett)	4 Weeks	1987
Michael Jackson	United States	"Bad"	1 Week	1987
Michael Jackson	United States	"Smooth Criminal"	1 Week	1988
Felix Jaehn	Germany	"Ain't Nobody"	1 Week	2015
Mick Jagger	United Kingdom	"(You Gotta Walk And) Don't Look Back" (with Peter Tosh)	3 Weeks	1979
Mick Jagger	United Kingdom	"Dancing in the Street" (with David Bowie)	2 Weeks	1985
Nicky Jam	United States	"El Perdón"	6 Weeks	2015
Jamaï	Netherlands	"Step Right Up"	7 Weeks	2003
Gudrun Jankis Orchestra	Sweden	"Letkis Jenka" (with Dutch Swing College Band and Stig Rauno)	5 Weeks	1965
Jawsh 685	New Zealand	"Savage Love (Laxed – Siren Beat)"	5 Weeks	2020
Jay and the Americans	United States	"Cara Mia"	3 Weeks	1980
Wyclef Jean	Haiti	"Hips Don't Lie" (with Shakira)	2 Weeks	2006
Jeckyll & Hyde	Netherlands	"Freefall"	2 Weeks	2007
Joan Jett and the Blackhearts	United States	"I Love Rock 'n' Roll"	1 Week	1982
De Jeugd van Tegenwoordig	Netherlands	"Watskeburt?!"	3 Weeks	2005
Saint Jhn	United States	"Roses"	2 Weeks	2020
Vika Jigulina	Romania	"Stereo Love" (with Edward Maya)	2 Weeks	2009
Jim	Netherlands	"Tell Her"	3 Weeks	2003
Jive Bunny and the Mastermixers	United Kingdom	"Swing the Mood"	1 Week	1989
Billy Joel	United States	"Goodnight Saigon"	3 Weeks	1983
Johan & de Groothandel	Netherlands	"As Dick me hullep nodig heb"	2 Weeks	1994
Elton John	United Kingdom	"Nikita"	7 Weeks	1985–86
Elton John	United Kingdom	"Don't Let the Sun Go Down on Me" (with George Michael)	8 Weeks	1992
Elton John	United Kingdom	"Something About the Way You Look Tonight" / "Candle In the Wind 1997"	5 Weeks	1997
Elton John	United Kingdom	"Sorry Seems to Be the Hardest Word" (with Blue)	5 Weeks	2003
Elton John	United Kingdom	"Merry Christmas	1 Week	2021
Johnny & Orquesta Rodrigues	Cape Verde	"Hey Mal Yo"	2 Weeks	1975
Gerard Joling	Netherlands	"Ticket to the Tropics"	1 Week	1985
Gerard Joling	Netherlands	"No More Bolero's"	6 Weeks	1989
Gerard Joling	Netherlands	"Blijf bij mij (dit zijn voor mij de allermooiste uren)" (with André Hazes)	11 Weeks	2007
Jonas Blue	United Kingdom	"Mama"	2 Weeks	2017
Tom Jones	United Kingdom	"Green, Green Grass of Home"	2 Weeks	1967
Freek de Jonge	Netherlands	"Leven na de dood" (with Stips)	2 Weeks	1997
Joost	Netherlands	"Europapa"	7 Weeks	2024
Jop	Netherlands	"Jij bent de zon"	4 Weeks	2000
Alexis Jordan	United States	"Happiness"	10 Weeks	2011
José	Netherlands	"I Will Follow Him"	1 Week	1982
Justen de Wildt	Netherlands	"Cheerio"	4 Weeks	2026
Artist	Nationality	Single	Weeks at No. 1	Year
Noah Kahan	United States	"Stick Season"	7 Weeks	2024
Roland Kaiser	Germany	"Santa Maria"	2 Weeks	1980–81
Kamahl	Australia	"The Elephant Song"	5 Weeks	1975
Kane	Netherlands	"Something to Say"	2 Weeks	2005
Kane	Netherlands	"Fearless"	3 Weeks	2005
Kane	Netherlands	"Shot of a Gun"	2 Weeks	2008
Mory Kanté	Guinea	"Yé Ké Yé Ké"	2 Weeks	1988
Kaoma	France	"Lambada"	3 Weeks	1989
De Kapotte Kontjes	Netherlands	"Lauwe pis" (with Theo Maassen)	2 Weeks	2007
KC and the Sunshine Band	United States	"That's the Way (I Like It)"	2 Weeks	1975
K-Ci & JoJo	United States	"All My Life"	4 Weeks	1998
Yvonne Keeley	Netherlands	"If I Had Words" (with Scott Fitzgerald)	6 Weeks	1978
The Kelly Family	United States	"I Can't Help Myself (I Love You, I Want You)"	6 Weeks	1996
R. Kelly	United States	"I Believe I Can Fly"	1 Week	1997
R. Kelly	United States	"If I Could Turn Back the Hands of Time"	8 Weeks	1999
Karin Kent	Netherlands	"Dans je de hele nacht met mij?"	1 Week	1966
Las Ketchup	Spain	"The Ketchup Song (Aserejé)"	9 Weeks	2002
Alicia Keys	United States	"Fallin'"	4 Weeks	2001
Master KG	South Africa	"Jerusalema"	5 Weeks	2020
The Kid Laroi	Australia	"Stay"	6 Weeks	2021
Kimbra	New Zealand	"Somebody That I Used to Know" (with Gotye)	5 Weeks	2011
Van B. King	Netherlands	"Follow the Leader" (with The Soca Boys)	3 Weeks	1998
The Kinks	United Kingdom	"Dedicated Follower of Fashion"	3 Weeks	1966
The Kinks	United Kingdom	"Sunny Afternoon"	4 Weeks	1966
The Kinks	United Kingdom	"Waterloo Sunset"	1 Week	1967
The Kinks	United Kingdom	"Lola"	3 Weeks	1970
The Kinks	United Kingdom	"Lola (live version)"	4 Weeks	1981
Sharon Kips	Netherlands	"Heartbreak Away"	3 Weeks	2007
Kiss	United States	"I Was Made for Lovin' You"	4 Weeks	1979
Klangkarussell	Austria	"Sonnentanz"	2 Weeks	2013
Lil' Kleine	Netherlands	"Drank & Drugs"	3 Weeks	2015
Lil' Kleine	Netherlands	"Verleden tijd"	6 Weeks	2018
Hank the Knife and the Jets	Netherlands	"Stan the Gunman"	1 Week	1975
Boer Koekoek	Netherlands	"Den Uyl is in den olie" (with Vader Abraham)	2 Weeks	1974
John Kraaijkamp, Sr.	Netherlands	"De bostella" (with Rijk de Gooyer)	2 Weeks	1967
Krezip	Netherlands	"I Would Stay"	3 Weeks	2000
Kris Kross Amsterdam	Netherlands	"Hij is van mij"	7 Weeks	2019
Kris Kross Amsterdam	Netherlands	"How You Samba"	4 Weeks	2023
Wolter Kroes	Netherlands	"Viva Hollandia (EK 2008 version)"	2 Weeks	2008
Artist	Nationality	Single	Weeks at No. 1	Year
L.A. Style	Netherlands	"James Brown Is Dead"	2 Weeks	1991
Labelle	United States	"Voulez-vous coucher avec moi ce soir? (Lady Marmalade)"	4 Weeks	1975
Lady Gaga	United States	"Just Dance" (with Colby O'Donis)	2 Weeks	2009
Lady Gaga	United States	"Poker Face"	8 Weeks	2009
Lady Gaga	United States	"Born This Way"	2 Weeks	2011
Lady Gaga	United States	"Die with a Smile"	17 Weeks	2024
Lange Frans & Baas B	Netherlands	"Zinloos" (with Ninthe)	3 Weeks	2004
Lange Frans & Baas B	Netherlands	"Het land van..."	2 Weeks	2005
Duncan Laurence	Netherlands	"Arcade"	4 Weeks	2019
Vicky Leandros	Greece	"Après toi"	4 Weeks	1972
Vicky Leandros	Greece	"Ich hab' die Liebe geseh'n"	5 Weeks	1972
Paul de Leeuw	Netherlands	"Ik wil niet dat je liegt" / "Waarheen waarvoor"	8 Weeks	1994
John Legend	(United States)	"All of Me"	4 Weeks	2014
D.C. Lewis	Netherlands	"Mijn gebed"	4 Weeks	1970
Leona Lewis	United Kingdom	"Bleeding Love"	3 Weeks	2008
Ryan Lewis	United States	"Thrift Shop" (with Macklemore and Wanz)	1 Week	2013
Libianca	/ (Cameroon)	"People"	3 Weeks	2023
Lil Jon	United States	"Yeah!" (with Usher and Ludacris)	4 Weeks	2004
Lil Louis	United States	"French Kiss"	2 Weeks	1989
Gusttavo Lima	Brazil	"Balada"	13 Weeks	2012
Linda, Roos & Jessica	Netherlands	"Ademnood"	8 Weeks	1995–96
Dua Lipa	United Kingdom	"New Rules"	1 Week	2017
Dua Lipa	United Kingdom	"One Kiss"	16 Weeks	2018
Dua Lipa	United Kingdom	"Dance the Night"	4 Weeks	2023
Lipps Inc.	United States	"Funkytown"	3 Weeks	1980
Lisa Lois	Netherlands	"Hallelujah"	4 Weeks	2009
J.C. Lodge	United Kingdom	"Someone Loves You Honey" (with Prince Mohammed)	6 Weeks	1982
Londonbeat	United Kingdom	"I've Been Thinking About You"	4 Weeks	1990
Long Tall Ernie & The Shakers	Netherlands	"Do You Remember"	4 Weeks	1977
Lisa 'Left Eye' Lopes	United States	"Never Be the Same Again" (with Melanie C)	2 Weeks	2000
Jennifer Lopez	United States	"If You Had My Love"	1 Week	1999
Jennifer Lopez	United States	"Love Don't Cost a Thing"	2 Weeks	2001
Loreen	Sweden	"Tattoo"	4 Weeks	2023
Los del Río	Spain	"Macarena (Bayside Boys Mix)"	4 Weeks	1996
Lucenzo	Portugal	"Danza Kuduro" (with Don Omar)	7 Weeks	2011
Ludacris	United States	"Yeah!" (with Usher and Lil Jon)	4 Weeks	2004
Lumidee	United States	"Never Leave You (Uh Oooh, Uh Oooh)"	4 Weeks	2003
Luniz	United States	"I Got 5 on It" (with Michael Marshall)	1 Week	1996
Luv'	Netherlands	"You're the Greatest Lover"	4 Weeks	1978
Luv'	Netherlands	"Trojan Horse"	1 Week	1978
L.V.	United States	"Gangsta's Paradise" (with Coolio)	5 Weeks	1995
Artist	Nationality	Single	Weeks at No. 1	Year
Maan	Netherlands	"Blijven slapen"	10 Weeks	2021
M|A|R|R|S	United Kingdom	"Pump Up The Volume"	1 Week	1987
Theo Maassen	Netherlands	"Lauwe pis"	2 Weeks	2007
Amy Macdonald	United Kingdom	"This Is the Life"	2 Weeks	2008
Macklemore	United States	"Thrift Shop"	1 Week	2013
Madcon	Norway	"Beggin'"	2 weeks	2009
Mad'House	(Netherlands)	"Like A Prayer"	2 weeks	2002
Wes	Cameroon	"Alane"	8 weeks	1997
Madonna	United States	"Into the Groove"	3 weeks	1985
Madonna	United States	"Who's That Girl"	4 weeks	1987
Madonna	United States	"Hung Up"	7 weeks	2005
Madonna	United States	"4 Minutes"	2 weeks	2008
Madonna	United States	"Give It 2 Me"	6 weeks	2008
Major Lazer	United States	"Lean On"	4 weeks	2015
Major Lazer	United States	"Cold Water"	6 Weeks	2016
Mario	United States	"Let Me Love You"	1 week	2005
Maroon 5	United States	"Moves Like Jagger"	3 weeks	2011
Marshmello	United States	"Friends"	2 weeks	2018
Bruno Mars	United States	"Nothin' on You"	2 weeks	2010
Bruno Mars	United States	"Billionaire"	1 week	2010
Bruno Mars	United States	"Just the way You Are"	11 weeks	2010
Bruno Mars	United States	"Die with a Smile"	17 Weeks	2024
Bruno Mars	United States	"Apt."	10 Weeks	2025
Bruno Mars	United States	"I Just Might"	11 Weeks	2026
Massada	Netherlands	"Sajang é"	2 Weeks	1980
Massive Attack	United Kingdom	"Unfinished Sympathy"	1 week	1991
Edward Maya	Romania	"Stereo Love"	2 weeks	2009
Maywood	Netherlands	"Late At Night"	3 weeks	1980
Ava Max	(United States)	"Sweet but Psycho"	3 weeks	2019
Travie McCoy	United States	"Billionaire"	1 week	2010
Maria McKee	United States	"Show Me Heaven"	2 weeks	1990
Bitty Mclean	United Kingdom	"It Keeps Rainin' (Tears from My Eyes)"	2 weeks	1993
Don McLean	United States	"Crying"	5 Weeks	1980
MC Miker G & DJ Sven	Netherlands	"Holiday Rap"	3 weeks	1986
Tate McRae	Canada	"Greedy"	15 Weeks	2023
MEAU	Netherlands	"Dat heb jij gedaan"	8 weeks	2022
Meat Loaf	United States	"I'd Do Anything for Love (But I Won't Do That)"	6 weeks	1993
Glenn Medeiros	Spain	"Nothing's Gonna Change My Love For You"	6 weeks	1988
Bill Medley	United States	"(I've Had) The Time of My Life"	9 weeks	1988
Guus Meeuwis	Netherlands	"Het is een nacht... (Levensecht)"	7 weeks	1995
Guus Meeuwis	Netherlands	"Per spoor (Kedeng kedeng)"	4 weeks	1996
Guus Meeuwis	Netherlands	"Geef mij je angst (Give Me Your Fear)"	7 weeks	2005
Guus Meeuwis	Netherlands	"Tranen gelachen"	2 weeks	2007
Mel and Kim	United Kingdom	"Showing Out (Get Fresh at the Weekend)"	4 weeks	1987
Mel and Kim	United Kingdom	"Respectable"	3 weeks	1987
Men2B	Netherlands	"Bigger Than That"	2 weeks	2004–2005
Sérgio Mendes	Brazil	"Mas Que Nada"	2 weeks	2006
Shawn Mendes	Canada	"Señorita"	12 weeks	2019
Anita Meyer	Netherlands	"Why Tell Me Why"	6 weeks	1981
George Michael	United Kingdom	"Careless Whisper"	5 weeks	1984
George Michael	United Kingdom	"A Different Corner"	1 week	1986
George Michael	United Kingdom	"Faith"	6 weeks	1987
George Michael	United Kingdom	"I Want Your Sex"	3 weeks	1987
George Michael	United Kingdom	"I Knew You Were Waiting (For Me)"	3 weeks	1987
George Michael	United Kingdom	"Don't Let the Sun Go Down on Me"	8 weeks	1992
Davina Michelle	Netherlands	"Duurt te lang"	11 weeks	2018–2019
Davina Michelle	Netherlands	"Hoe het danst"	3 weeks	2019
Davina Michelle	Netherlands	"17 miljoen mensen"	4 weeks	2020
Mika	United Kingdom	"Relax, Take It Easy"	8 weeks	2007
Jamie Miller	(Wales)	"Babydoll"	3 Weeks	2026
Milli Vanilli	United States	"Girl I'm Gonna Miss You"	5 weeks	1989
Stephanie Mills	United States	"Never Knew Love Like This Before"	1 Week	1980
Milow	Belgium	"Ayo Technology"	4 weeks	2009
Kylie Minogue	Australia	"Can't Get You Out of My Head"	6 weeks	2001
MNEK	United Kingdom	"Head & Heart"	5 weeks	2020
Prince Mohammed	Jamaica	"Someone Loves You Honey"	6 weeks	1982
Mohombi	Sweden	"Bumpy Ride"	1 week	2010
Monica	United States	"The Boy Is Mine"	3 week	1998
Irene Moors	Netherlands	"No Limit"	6 Weeks	1995
Nana Mouskouri	Greece	"Only Love"	2 weeks	1985
Mr. Big	United States	"To Be with You"	4 weeks	1992
Mr Probz	Netherlands	"Nothing Really Matters"	7 weeks	2014
Musical Youth	(United Kingdom)	"Pass the Dutchie"	4 weeks	1982
Artist	Nationality	Single	Weeks at No. 1	Year
Aya Nakamura	(Mali)	"Djadja"	2 weeks	2018
Anne-Marie	United Kingdom	"Friends"	2 weeks	2018
Nelly	United States	"Dilemma"	7 weeks	2002
Nena	Germany	"Anyplace, Anywhere, Anytime"	5 weeks	2003
Nena (band)	Germany	"99 Luftballons"	4 weeks	1983
Olivia Newton-John	United States	"Xanadu"	3 weeks	1980
Nienke	Netherlands	"Het huis Anubis"	1 week	2007
Sandra van Nieuwland	Netherlands	"Keep Your Head Up"	2 weeks	2012
Anne-Marie	United Kingdom	"Rockabye"	5 Weeks	2016/2017
Nick & Simon	Netherlands	"Julia"	2 weeks	2013
Nico & Vinz	Norway	"Am I Wrong"	3 weeks	2014
Nicole	Germany	"Ein bißchen Frieden"	4 weeks	1982
Rob de Nijs	Netherlands	"Banger hart"	5 weeks	1996
Anders Nilsen	Norway	"Salsa Tequila"	3 weeks	2014
No Doubt	United States	"Don't Speak"	7 weeks	1996–1997
No Mercy	United States	"When I Die"	4 weeks	1997
The Notorious B.I.G.	United States	"I'll Be Missing You"	9 weeks	1997
Nova	Netherlands	"Aurora"	2 weeks	1982
Artist	Nationality	Single	Weeks at No. 1	Year
Sinéad O'Connor	(Republic of Ireland)	"Nothing Compares 2 U"	8 weeks	1990
O-Zone	(Moldova)	"Dragostea din tei"	9 weeks	2004
Billy Ocean	United States	"When the going gets tough, the tough get going"	5 weeks	1986
Billy Ocean	United States	"Get Outta My Dreams, Get into My Car"	1 week	1988
OMI	Jamaica	"Cheerleader"Felix Jaehn Remix	11 weeks	2015
OneRepublic	United States	"Apologize"	4 weeks	2007–2008
The Opposites	Netherlands	"Slapeloze nachten"	1 week	2012
Orchestral Manoeuvres in the Dark	United Kingdom	"Maid of Orleans (The Waltz Joan of Arc)"	4 weeks	1982
Outkast	United States	"Ms. Jackson"	1 week	2001
The Offspring	United States	"Pretty Fly (for a White Guy)"	3 weeks	1999
Outlandish	Denmark	"Aïcha"	2 weeks	2003
Owl City	United States	"Fireflies"	10 weeks	2009–2010
Artist	Nationality	Single	Weeks at No. 1	Year
Gers Pardoel	Netherlands	"Ik Neem Je Mee "	6 weeks	2011
Ryan Paris	Italy	"Dolce Vita"	2 weeks	1983
Dolly Parton	United States	"You Are"	3 weeks	1983/1984
The Pasadenas	United States	"Tribute (Right On)"	4 weeks	1988
Passenger	United Kingdom	"Let Her Go"	2 weeks	2012
Raffaëla Paton	(Netherlands)	"Right Here, Right Now (My Heart Belongs to You)"	5 weeks	2006
Party Animals	(Netherlands)	"Have You Ever Been Mellow"	1 week	1996
Party Animals	(Netherlands)	"Hava Naquila"	3 weeks	1996
Party Animals	(Netherlands)	"Aquarius/Let the Sunshine In"	3 weeks	1996
Sean Paul	Jamaica	"Get Busy"	1 week	2003
Sean Paul	Jamaica	"Rockabye"	5 Weeks	2016/2017
Laura Pausini	Italy	"La solitudine"	1 week	1994
Katy Perry	United States	"I Kissed a Girl"	2 weeks	2008
Katy Perry	United States	"Dark Horse"	2 weeks	2014
Katy Perry	United States	"Hot n Cold"	2 weeks	2009
Ph.D.	United Kingdom	"I Won't Let You Down"	1 week	1982
Coole Piet	Netherlands	"Paniek In De Confettifabriek"	1 week	2006
Pink	United States	"Just Give Me a Reason"	3 weeks	2013
Pink	United States	"What About Us"	7 weeks	2017
Pitbull	United States	"I Know You Want Me (Calle Ocho)"	5 weeks	2009
Pitbull	United States	"Give Me Everything"	2 weeks	2011
Pitbull	United States	"Timber"	4 weeks	2013
Pitbull	United States	"Fireball"	4 weeks	2014
The Police	United Kingdom	"Every Little Thing She Does Is Magic"	3 weeks	1981
Mike Posner	United States	"I Took a Pill in Ibiza" (Seeb Remix)	10 weeks	2016
Pras	(United States)	"Ghetto Supastar (That Is What You Are)"	3 weeks	1998
Prince	United States	"Purple Rain"	4 weeks	1984
Prince	United States	"The Most Beautiful World"	2 weeks	1994
PSY	South Korea	"Gangnam Style"	2 weeks	2012
De Poema's	Netherlands	"Zij maakt het verschil"	2 weeks	2001
Artist	Nationality	Single	Weeks at No. 1	Year
Queen	United Kingdom	"Under Pressure"	1 Week	1981
Queen	United Kingdom	"Radio GaGa"	1 Week	1984
Queen	United Kingdom	"I Want to Break Free"	2 weeks	1984
Quintino	Netherlands	"Epic"	1 week	2011
Artist	Nationality	Single	Weeks at No. 1	Year
R.E.M.	United States	"Losing My Religion"	3 weeks	1991
Raffish	Netherlands	"Plaything"	1 week	2005
Rayvon	Barbados	"Angel"	7 weeks	2001
Red Hot Chili Peppers	United States	"Under the Bridge"	3 weeks	1992
Rednex	Sweden	"Cotton-Eyed Joe"	2 weeks	1994
Jaap Reesema	Netherlands	"Nu Wij Niet Meer Praten"	1 week	2021
Reel 2 Real	United States	"I Like to Move It"	4 weeks	1994
Matthias Reim	Germany	"Verdammt, ich lieb' dich"	4 weeks	1990
Rema	Nigeria	"Calm Down"	4 weeks	2022
Renée and Renato	Italy	"Save Your Love (Renée and Renato song)"	1 week	1983
Bebe Rexha	United States	"I'm Good (Blue)"	12 weeks	2022
Sofia Reyes	Mexico	"How You Samba"	4 weeks	2023
Lionel Richie	United States	"Hello"	4 weeks	1984
The Righteous Brothers	United States	"Unchained Melody"	2 weeks	1990
Rihanna	Barbados	"Don't Stop the Music"	2 weeks	2001
Rikrok	(United Kingdom)	"It Wasn't Me"	7 weeks	2001
Def Rhymz	Netherlands	"Doekoe"	1 week	1999
Def Rhymz	Netherlands	"Puf / Schudden"	2 weeks	2001
Lionel Richie	United States	"All Night Long (All Night)"	4 Weeks	1983
LeAnn Rimes	United States	"Can't Fight the Moonlight"	5 Weeks	2000–2001
Rubberen Robbie	Netherlands	"De Nederlandse sterre die strale overa"	3 Weeks	1981
The Rock Steady Crew	United States	"(Hey You) The Rock Steady Crew"	4 Weeks	1983
Olivia Rodrigo	United States	"Drivers License"	5 Weeks	2021
Olivia Rodrigo	United States	"Good 4 U"	6 Weeks	2021
The Rolling Stones	United Kingdom	"Paint It Black"	4 weeks	1990
Mark Ronson	United Kingdom	"Valerie"	4 weeks	2008
Roots Syndicate	Netherlands	"Mockin' Bird Hill"	2 weeks	1993
Rosé	South Korea	"Apt."	10 Weeks	2025
Diana Ross	United States	"Why Do Fools Fall In Love"	2 Weeks	1981
Kelly Rowland	United Kingdom	"Dilemma"	7 weeks	2002
Roxette	Sweden	"Joyride"	2 weeks	1991
Run-D.M.C.	United States	"It's Like That"	3 weeks	1998
Artist	Nationality	Single	Weeks at No. 1	Year
S10	Netherlands	"De diepte"	1 week	2022
Robin S.	United States	"Show me Love 2008"	3 weeks	2008
Sak Noel	Spain	"Loca People"	4 weeks	2011
Salt-N-Pepa	United States	"Push It"	3 weeks	1988
Salt-N-Pepa	United States	"Let's Talk About Sex"	3 weeks	1991
Sandra	Germany	"(I'll Never Be) Maria Magdalena"	2 weeks	1985
Schnappi	Germany	"Schnappi, das kleine Krokodil"	4 weeks	2005
Scoop	Belgium	"Drop It"	3 weeks	2000
Scorpions	Germany	"Wind of Change"	3 weeks	1991
Seal	United States	"Crazy"	3 weeks	1991
Shanice	United States	"I Love Your Smile"	1 week	1992
Shaggy	Jamaica	"Angel"	7 weeks	2001
Shaggy	Jamaica	"It Wasn't Me"	7 weeks	2001
Shaggy	Jamaica	"Banana"	5 Weeks	2020
Shakira	Colombia	"Whenever, Wherever"	9 weeks	2002
Shakira	Colombia	"Underneath Your Clothes"	4 weeks	2002
Shakira	Colombia	"Hips Don't Lie"	2 weeks	2006
Shakira	Colombia	"Beautiful Liar"	3 weeks	2007
Shakira	Colombia	"Dai Dai"	15 Weeks	2026
Tupac Shakur	United States	"Changes"	3 weeks	1999
Feargal Sharkey	(Republic of Ireland)	"A Good Heart"	2 weeks	1986
Ed Sheeran	United Kingdom	"Thinking Out Loud"	5 weeks	2014
Ed Sheeran	United Kingdom	"Perfect"	9 weeks	2017–2018
Ed Sheeran	United Kingdom	"Shape of You"	15 weeks	2017
Ed Sheeran	United Kingdom	"Bad Habits"	5 Weeks	2021
Ed Sheeran	United Kingdom	"Merry Christmas"	1 Week	2021
Ed Sheeran	United Kingdom	"Azizam"	3 Weeks	2025
The Shorts	(Netherlands)	"Comment ça va"	3 weeks	1983
Rolf Sanchez	Netherlands	"Más más más"	2 weeks	2020
Sandro Silva	Netherlands	"Epic"	1 week	2011
Nina Simone	United States	"My Baby Just Cares for Me"	1 week	1987
Simple Minds	United States	"Don't You (Forget About Me)"	3 weeks	1985
Simple Minds	United States	"Belfast Child"	2 weeks	1989
Margaret Singana	South Africa	"We Are Growing (Shaka Zulu)"	4 weeks	1989
William Singe	Australia	"Mama"	2 Weeks	2017
Sita	Netherlands	"Happy"	2 weeks	2001
Sita	Netherlands	"Lopen op het water"	4 weeks	2002
Jan Smit	Netherlands	"Ik zing dit lied voor jou alleen"	7 weeks	1997
Jan Smit	Netherlands	"Als De Morgen Is Gekomen"	5 Weeks	2006
Jan Smit	Netherlands	"Cupido"	5 Weeks	2006–2007
Jan Smit	Netherlands	"Dan volg je haar benen"	4 weeks	2007
Jan Smit	Netherlands	"Op weg naar geluk"	1 week	2007
Jan Smit	Netherlands	"Mi Rowsu"	3 weeks	2009
The Smurfs	Belgium	"No Limit"	6 weeks	1995
Snap!	Germany	"The Power"	4 weeks	1990
Snap!	Germany	"Rhythm Is a Dancer"	4 weeks	1992
Snelle	Netherlands	"Reünie"	1 week	2019
Snelle	Netherlands	"Smoorvierliefd"	3 Weeks	2020
Snelle	Netherlands	"17 miljoen mensen"	4 weeks	2020
Snelle	Netherlands	"Blijven slapen"	10 Weeks	2021
Sniff 'n' the Tears	United Kingdom	"Driver's Seat"	3 weeks	1991
Snow	Canada	"Con Calma"	1 weeks	2019
Snow Patrol	(Republic of Ireland)	"Just Say Yes"	3 weeks	2009
The Soca Boys	Spain	"Follow The Leader"	3 weeks	1998
Soul II Soul	United States	"Back to Life (However Do You Want Me)"	2 weeks	1989
Martin Solveig	France	"Hello"	4 weeks	2011
Spargo	Netherlands	"You And Me"	3 weeks	1980
Britney Spears	United States	"Sometimes"	2 weeks	1999
Spice Girls	United Kingdom	"Wannabe"	2 weeks	1996
Bruce Springsteen	United States	"Dancing In the Dark"	1 week	1985
Bruce Springsteen	United States	"I'm on Fire"	3 weeks	1985
Lisa Stansfield	United Kingdom	"All Around the World"	4 weeks	1990
Alvin Stardust	United Kingdom	"Pretend"	2 weeks	1981
Stars on 45	Netherlands	"Stars on 45 Medley"	4 weeks	1981
Starmaker	Netherlands	"Damn (I Think I Love You)"	5 weeks	2001
Star Sisters	United States	"Stars on 45Proudly Presents The Star Sisters"	5 weeks	1983
Berdien Stenberg	Netherlands	"Rondo Russo"	3 weeks	1983
Steve Miller Band	United States	"The Joker"	2 weeks	1990
David A. Stewart	United Kingdom	"Lily Was Here"	5 weeks	1989
Barbra Streisand	United States	"Woman in Love"	6 weeks	1980
Barbra Streisand	United States	"Tell Him"	2 weeks	1997–1998
Stromae	Belgium	"Alors on danse"	8 weeks	2010
Studio Killers	Denmark	"Ode to the Bouncer"	1 week	2012
Harry Styles	United Kingdom	"As It Was"	18 weeks	2022
The Sugarhill Gang	United States	"Rapper's Delight"	3 weeks	1980
Donna Summer	United States	"State of Independence"	1 week	1982
Suzan & Freek	Netherlands	"Als het avond is"	3 weeks	2019
Suzan & Freek	Netherlands	"Pijnstiller"	2 weeks	2026
Swedish House Mafia	Sweden	"One"	2 weeks	2010
Taylor Swift	United States	"The Fate of Ophelia"	10 weeks	2025–26
Artist	Nationality	Single	Weeks at No. 1	Year
T'Pau	United Kingdom	"China in Your Hand"	2 weeks	1988
Tears for Fears	United Kingdom	"Shout"	3 weeks	1985
Technohead	Germany	"I Wanna Be A Hippy"	3 weeks	1995
Michel Teló	Brazil	"Ai Se Eu Te Pego!"	11 weeks	2012
Tinie Tempah	United Kingdom	"How You Samba"	4 Weeks	2023
Robin Thicke	Canada	"Blurred Lines"	11 weeks	2013
Pommelien Thijs	Belgium	"Nu Wij Niet Meer Praten"	1 week	2021
Dante Thomas	United States	"Miss California"	1 week	2001
Jasmine Thompson	United Kingdom	"Ain't Nobody"	1 Week	2015
Tiësto	Netherlands	"The Business"	7 Weeks	2020–2021
Tiësto	Netherlands	"The Motto"	3 Weeks	2022
Tight Fit	United Kingdom	"The Lion Sleeps Tonight"	2 Weeks	1982
Justin Timberlake	United States	"Can't Stop the Feeling!"	8 Weeks	2016
Timbaland	United States	"Apologize"	4 weeks	2007–2008
Timmy T	United States	"One More Try"	2 weeks	1991
Tones and I	Australia	"Dance Monkey"	15 weeks	2019–2020
Tove Lo	Sweden	"Stay High"	3 weeks	2014
Toy-Box	Denmark	"Best Friend"	4 weeks	1999
Train	United States	"Hey, Soul Sister"	7 weeks	2010
Treble	Netherlands	"Ramaganana"	1 week	2004
Triggerfinger	Belgium	"I Follow Rivers"	6 weeks	2012
Tina Turner	United States	"Tonight"	4 weeks	1989
Twarres	Netherlands	"Wêr bisto"	6 weeks	2000
Artist	Nationality	Single	Weeks at No. 1	Year
U2	(Republic of Ireland)	"Beautiful Day"	2 weeks	2000
U2	(Republic of Ireland)	"Elevation"	1 week	2001
U2	(Republic of Ireland)	"The Saints Are Coming"	2 weeks	2006
U2	(Republic of Ireland)	"Window in the Skies"	2 weeks	2007
UB40	Jamaica	"Red Red Wine"	3 Weeks	1983
UB40	Jamaica	"I Got You Babe"	1 weeks	1985
UB40	Jamaica	"Sing Our Own Song"	4 weeks	1986
UB40	Jamaica	"Kingston Town"	2 weeks	1990
UB40	Jamaica	"I Can't Help Falling In Love With You"	5 weeks	1993
Ultravox	United Kingdom	"Vienna"	3 weeks	1981
The Underdog Project	(Germany) (Belgium)	"Summer Jam 2003"	9 weeks	2003
USA for Africa	United States	"We Are the World"	6 Weeks	1985
Usher	United States	"Yeah!"	4 weeks	2004
Artist	Nationality	Single	Weeks at No. 1	Year
Armin van Buuren	Netherlands	"Hoe het danst"	3 weeks	2019
Vangelis	Greece	"Conquest of Paradise"	10 weeks	1995
Vanilla Ice	United States	"Ice Ice Baby"	7 weeks	1990–1991
Vaya Con Dios	Belgium	"What's a Woman?"	3 weeks	1990
Piet Veerman	Netherlands	"Sailing Home"	4 weeks	1987
Vengaboys	Netherlands	"Boom, Boom, Boom, Boom!!"	4 weeks	1998
Vengaboys	Netherlands	"We're Going to Ibiza"	3 weeks	1999
The Voice of Holland	Netherlands	"One Thousand Voices"	1 week	2011
Artist	Nationality	Single	Weeks at No. 1	Year
Jennifer Warnes	United States	"(I've Had) The Time of My Life"	9 weeks	1988
Alex Warren	United States	"Ordinary"	17 Weeks	2025
Alex Warren	United States	"Fever Dream"	7 Weeks	2026
Marianne Weber	Netherlands	"De regenboog"	3 weeks	1997
The Weeknd	Canada	"Starboy"	4 weeks	2016
The Weeknd	Canada	"Blinding Lights"	13 weeks	2020
Wet Wet Wet	United Kingdom	"Love Is All Around"	4 weeks	1994
Wham!	United Kingdom	"Wake Me Up Before You Go-Go"	2 weeks	1984
Wham!	United Kingdom	"The Edge of Heaven"	3 weeks	1986
Pharrell Williams	United States	"Happy"	4 weeks	2013
will.i.am	United States	"This Is Love"	1 week	2012
will.i.am	United States	"Scream & Shout"	4 weeks	2014
Robbie Williams	United Kingdom	"Feel"	3 weeks	2002–2003
Robbie Williams	United Kingdom	"Tripping"	3 weeks	2005
Robbie Williams	United Kingdom	"Bodies"	4 weeks	2009
Willy William	France	"Mi Gente"	5 Weeks	2017
Jackie Wilson	United States	"Reet Petite"	2 weeks	1987
Mario Winans	United States	"I Don't Wanna Know"	1 week	2004
Dinand Woesthoff	Netherlands	"Dreamer (Gussie's song)"	2 weeks	2004
Womack & Womack	United States	"Teardrops"	6 weeks	1988
Stevie Wonder	United States	"I Just Called to Say I Love You"	3 weeks	1984
Artist	Nationality	Single	Weeks at No. 1	Year
XYP	(United Kingdom)	"Body to Body"	1 week	2007
Artist	Nationality	Single	Weeks at No. 1	Year
Daddy Yankee	Puerto Rico	"Despacito" (with Luis Fonsi and Justin Bieber)	15 Weeks	2017
Daddy Yankee	Puerto Rico	"Con Calma"	1 Week	2019
Yazz	United Kingdom	"The Only Way Is Up"	2 weeks	1988
Yolanda Be Cool	Australia	"We No Speak Americano"	8 weeks	2010
Paul Young	United Kingdom	"Love of the Common People"	4 weeks	1984
Artist	Nationality	Single	Weeks at No. 1	Year
Nomcebo Zikode	South Africa	"Jerusalema"	5 Weeks	2020
