= List of Dutch Top 40 number-one singles of 2024 =

This is a list of the Dutch Top 40 number-one singles of 2024. The Dutch Top 40 is a chart that ranks the best-performing singles of the Netherlands. It is published every week by radio station Qmusic.

== Chart history ==
List of Dutch Top 40 number-one singles of 2024
Issue date	Song	Artist(s)	Ref.
6 January	"Greedy"	Tate McRae	
13 January	"Greedy"	Tate McRae	
20 January	"Stick Season"	Noah Kahan	
27 January	"Stick Season"	Noah Kahan	
3 February	"Stick Season"	Noah Kahan	
10 February	"Stick Season"	Noah Kahan	
17 February	"Stick Season"	Noah Kahan	
24 February	"Stick Season"	Noah Kahan	
2 March	"Stick Season"	Noah Kahan	
9 March	"Europapa"	Joost	
16 March	"Europapa"	Joost	
23 March	"Europapa"	Joost	
30 March	"Europapa"	Joost	
6 April	"Europapa"	Joost	
13 April	"Sugardaddy"	Roxy Dekker	
20 April	"Sugardaddy"	Roxy Dekker	
27 April	"Sugardaddy"	Roxy Dekker	
4 May	"Sugardaddy"	Roxy Dekker	
11 May	"Sugardaddy"	Roxy Dekker	
18 May	"Europapa"	Joost	
25 May	"Europapa"	Joost	
1 June	"Stumblin' In"	Cyril	
8 June	"Stumblin' In"	Cyril	
15 June	"Stumblin' In"	Cyril	
22 June	"Stumblin' In"	Cyril	
29 June	"Stumblin' In"	Cyril	
6 July	"Stumblin' In"	Cyril	
13 July	"Belong Together"	Mark Ambor	
20 July	"Belong Together"	Mark Ambor	
27 July	"Gaan we weg?"	Roxy Dekker featuring Ronnie Flex	
3 August	"Gaan we weg?"	Roxy Dekker featuring Ronnie Flex	
10 August	"Terug in de tijd"	Yves Berendse	
17 August	"Terug in de tijd"	Yves Berendse	
24 August	"Terug in de tijd"	Yves Berendse	
31 August	"Terug in de tijd"	Yves Berendse	
7 September	"Terug in de tijd"	Yves Berendse	
14 September	"Terug in de tijd"	Yves Berendse	
21 September	"Die with a Smile"	Lady Gaga and Bruno Mars	
28 September	"Die with a Smile"	Lady Gaga and Bruno Mars	
5 October	"Die with a Smile"	Lady Gaga and Bruno Mars	
12 October	"Die with a Smile"	Lady Gaga and Bruno Mars	
19 October	"Die with a Smile"	Lady Gaga and Bruno Mars	
26 October	"Die with a Smile"	Lady Gaga and Bruno Mars	
2 November	"Die with a Smile"	Lady Gaga and Bruno Mars	
9 November	"Die with a Smile"	Lady Gaga and Bruno Mars	
16 November	"Die with a Smile"	Lady Gaga and Bruno Mars	
23 November	"Die with a Smile"	Lady Gaga and Bruno Mars	
30 November	"Die with a Smile"	Lady Gaga and Bruno Mars	
7 December	"Die with a Smile"	Lady Gaga and Bruno Mars	
14 December	"Die with a Smile"	Lady Gaga and Bruno Mars	
21 December	"Die with a Smile"	Lady Gaga and Bruno Mars	
28 December	"Die with a Smile"	Lady Gaga and Bruno Mars	

== Number-one artists ==
Position	Artist	Weeks No. 1
1	Lady Gaga	15
1	Bruno Mars	15
2	Noah Kahan	7
2	Joost	7
2	Roxy Dekker	7
3	Cyril	6
3	Yves Berendse	6
4	Tate McRae	2
4	Mark Ambor	2
4	Ronnie Flex	2

== See also ==
- 2024 in music
