= Mama I Made It =

Studio album by Roxy Dekker
- Released: 7 March 2025
- Recorded: 2023–2025
- Genre: Nederpop
- Length: 29:46
- Language: Dutch
- Label: Warner Music Benelux
- Producers: Julian Vahle; Antoon; Elke Tiel; Stas Swaczyna; Lucky

Singles from Mama I Made It
- 1. "Anne-Fleur vakantie" Released: 26 May 2023; 2. "Satisfyer" Released: 10 November 2023; 3. "Sugardaddy" Released: 4 April 2024; 4. "Gaan we weg?" Released: 12 July 2024; 5. "Industry Plant" Released: 19 September 2024; 6. "Ga dan!" Released: 17 January 2025; 7. "Casual" Released: 14 March 2025; 8. "Jouw idee" Released: 14 March 2025

Mama I Made It is the debut studio album by Dutch singer and songwriter Roxy Dekker. The album was released on 7 March 2025 by Warner Music Benelux. The album features collaborations with Koen, Ronnie Flex and Russo.

== Background ==
On 26 February 2025, Dekker announced that she would release an album containing several of her successful singles. The goal was actually to have enough songs to perform at Paradiso and Melkweg and to delight her fans for a longer period of time during a festival, but in the end Dekker came up with enough songs to fill an entire album. The title of the album is a nod to a speech Dekker gave after winning an Edison.

In addition to the successful singles "Gaan we weg?", "Sugardaddy", "Satisfyer", "Industry Plant", "Ga dan!" and "Anne-Fleur vakantie", the album contains six new songs. These include two collaborations, but also the ballad "Jouw idee", with which Dekker tries to show a different side of herself. After the release of her debut album, "Casual" and "Jouw idee" were released as singles.

== Track listing ==
Mama I Made It track listing
No.	Title	Writer(s)	Producer(s)	Length
1.	"Casual"	Beer Petrie, Julian Vahle, Paul Sinha, Renske te Buck, Roxy Dekker	Julian Vahle, Lucky	2:22
2.	"Gaan we weg?" (featuring Ronnie Flex)	Ronnell Plasschaert, Ucahzo Hoogdorp, Julian Vahle, Renske te Buck, Roxy Dekker	Julian Vahle	2:21
3.	"Proost"	Julian Vahle, Paul Sinha, Renske te Buck, Roxy Dekker	Julian Vahle	2:27
4.	"Jouw Idee"	Julian Vahle, Paul Sinha, Renske te Buck, Roxy Dekker	Julian Vahle	3:20
5.	"Ga dan!"	Paul Sinha, Julian Vahle, Renkse te Buck, Roxy Dekker	Julian Vahle	2:17
6.	"Guilty Plessure" (featuring Russo)	Julian Vahle, Paul Sinha, Renske te Buck, Roxy Dekker, utger van Eck	Julian Vahle	2:39
7.	"Sugardaddy"	Beer Petrie, Julian Vahle, Renske te Buck, Roxy Dekker	Julian Vahle	2:11
8.	"1 nacht" (featuring Koen)	Julian Vahle, Koen van Heest, Paul Sinha, Renske te Buck, Roxy Dekker	Julian Vahle	2:13
9.	"Industry Plant"	Julian Vahle, Renske te Buck, Roxy Dekker	Julian Vahle	2:20
10.	"Over Datum"	Julian Vahle, Paul Sinha, Renske te Buck, Roxy Dekker	Julian Vahle	2:31
11.	"Satisfyer"	Maan de Steenwinkel, Valentijn Verkerk, Julian Vahle, Kevin Bosch, Roxy Dekker	Antoon	2:01
12.	"Anne-Fleur vakantie"	Roxy Dekker	Elke Tiel, Stas Swaczyna	2:54
Total length:				29:42

== Charts ==
=== Weekly charts ===
Weekly chart performance for Mama I Made It
Chart (2025)	Peak position
Belgian Albums (Ultratop Flanders)	1
Dutch Albums (Album Top 100)	1

=== Year-end charts ===
Year-end chart performance for Mama I Made It
Chart (2025)	Position
Dutch Albums (Album Top 100)	1
