= Gaan we weg? =

2024 single by Roxy Dekker

Single by Roxy Dekker and Ronnie Flex

from the album Mama I Made It
- Released: 12 July 2024
- Genre: Nederpop; house; pop rap
- Length: 2:21
- Label: Warner Music Benelux
- Songwriters: Julian Vahle; Renske te Buck; Ronell Plasschaert; Roxy Dekker; Ucahzo Hoogdorp
- Producer: Julian Vahle

Roxy Dekker singles chronology
"Huisfeestje" (2024)	"Gaan we weg?" (2024)	"Industry Plant" (2024)

Ronnie Flex singles chronology
"Desire" (2024)	"Gaan we weg?" (2024)	"After six" (2024)

"Gaan we weg?" (transl. Are We Going Away?) is a song by Dutch singer and songwriter Roxy Dekker and rapper Ronnie Flex. It was written by Dekker alongside Julian Vahle, Renske te Buck, Flex and Ucahzo Hoogdorp, with production handled by Vahle. The single was released on 12 July 2024 as the fourth single from her debut studio album, Mama I Made It.

== Background ==
"Gaan we weg?" was written by Julian Vahle, Renske te Buck, Ronell Plasschaert, Roxy Dekker and Ucahzo Hoogdorp and produced by Vahle. The genre of the song is a mix of Nederpop, house and pop rap. The song was written shortly after Dekker released her first hit single "Anne-Fleur vakantie". After the success of that song, Dekker decided to send Ronnie Flex a message via Instagram asking if they wanted to go into the studio together, to which the rapper responded enthusiastically. The song was made and Dekker said that she was emotional when she heard it for the first time because she thought her and Ronnie Flex' voices matched so well. Gaan we weg? was not released until a year later, after Dekker had had several major hits in the Netherlands with "Satisfyer", "Sugardaddy" and "Huisfeestje". Before the single was released, Dekker shared several videos on TikTok in which she played fragments of the song. The single was finally released on 12 July 2024.

== Commercial performance ==
After the single was released, it received a lot of attention on social media and on Dutch radio. On the first day, the song was listened to 700,000 times and on radio station 100% NL it was declared the Hit of 100. It entered the Single Top 100 at number one and also entered the Dutch Top 40 at number four. Eventually, it also reached number one in the Top 40 and stayed there for two weeks. In total, it stayed in this chart for thirteen weeks. It stayed at number one in the Single Top 100 for even longer. Here, it managed to hold on to number one for four weeks and stayed in the chart for a total of thirteen weeks. Dekker also had success with the song in Flanders. "Gaan we weg?" peaked at number 37 in the Flemish Ultratop 50 and was there for ten weeks. As of 2025, the single has platinum status in the Netherlands.

== Charts ==
Weekly chart performance for "Gaan we weg?"
Chart (2024)	Peak position
Belgium (Ultratop 50 Flanders)	37
Netherlands (Dutch Top 40)	1
Netherlands (Single Top 100)	1

== Certifications ==
Region	Certification	Certified units/sales
Netherlands (NVPI)	Platinum	93,000^{‡}
^{‡} Sales+streaming figures based on certification alone.
