= Satisfyer =

2023 single by Roxy Dekker

Single by Roxy Dekker

from the album Mama I Made It
- Released: 10 November 2023
- Genre: Nederpop
- Length: 2:01
- Label: Warner Music Benelux
- Songwriters: Julian Vahle; Kevin Bosch; Maan de Steenwinkel; Roxy Dekker; Valentijn Verkerk
- Producer: Antoon

Roxy Dekker singles chronology
"Anne-Fleur vakantie" (2023)	"Satisfyer" (2023)	"Sugardaddy" (2024)

"Satisfyer" is a song by Dutch singer and songwriter Roxy Dekker. It was written by Dekker alongside Julian Vahle, Kevin Bosch, Maan de Steenwinkel and, Valentijn Verkerk (Antoon), with production handled by Antoon. The single was released on 10 November 2023 as the second single from her debut studio album Mama I Made It.

== Background ==
"Satisfyer" was written by Julian Vahle, Kevin Bosch, Maan de Steenwinkel, Roxy Dekker and Valentijn Verkerk (Antoon) and produced by Antoon. It is a song that fits into the Nederpop genre. In the song, the artist sings about a sexual relationship with a person she describes as her "satisfyer". The song plays with the meaning of that word, which is known as a sex toy, but can also be seen as a person who can satisfy the songwriter.

An initial version of the song was made by Antoon for the singer Maan. After the success of Anne-Fleur vakantie, Antoon approached Dekker, congratulated her on her successes and suggested that they go into the studio together. Here, he offered her Satisfyer, after which they edited the song so that it would fit Dekker's style. Before the song was released as a single, it was already shared in short pieces on TikTok. This was under the title Airfryer. Satisfyer was not used because sex is not allowed to be promoted on TikTok and on the platform "Airfryer" is often used as a code word for "Satisfyer".

The song was declared the Hit of 100 on radio station 100% NL.

== Commercial performance ==
Dekker had success with the song in the Dutch charts. It peaked at fourth place in the Single Top 100 in the sixteen weeks that it was in this list. In the Dutch Top 40 it reached number nine in the fifteen weeks that it was in this chart. As of 2025, the single has platinum status in the Netherlands.

== Charts ==
Weekly chart performance for "Satisfyer"
Chart (2023–2024)	Peak position
Netherlands (Dutch Top 40)	9
Netherlands (Single Top 100)	4

== Certifications ==
Region	Certification	Certified units/sales
Netherlands (NVPI)	Platinum	93,000^{‡}
^{‡} Sales+streaming figures based on certification alone.
