= Los Darts =

1960s rock music band in Venezuela

- Origin: Venezuela
- Genres: Rock
- Labels: Sonus, Orbe, Top Hits, Discomoda, Istmo
- Past members: Richard Aumaitre; Augusto de Lima; Claudio Gámez; Victor Gámez; Carlos Moreán; Rafael "Parajito" Pimental

Los Darts was a 1960s rock music band from Venezuela who recorded for various labels. They had several hits in their country during the 1960s. They are a part of the history of Venezuelan rock music.

== Background ==
Along with Los Supersónicos, Los Impala and Los 007, Los Darts are regarded as one of the most important rock groups in Venezuela during the 1960s. Their chart hits include "Los Mejo Que Vio En Ti" in 1967, and "Por Alguien Como Tú" in 1970.

Formed in the mid-1960s, the group was made up of Carlos Moreán on rhythm guitar and backing vocals, Richard Aumaitre on bass and backing vocals, Rafael "Parajito" Pimental on drums, Augusto de Lima on lead guitar, Claudio Gámez on keyboards, and Victor Gámez on lead vocals.

== Career ==
In 1966, the group released their self titled debut album. Also that year, the group released their EP, Tu La Vas A Perder on Songs EPS 02. The songs on the EP were, "Tu La Vas A Perder", which was a cover of the Beatles "You're Going to Lose That Girl", "Por Tu Amor", "Donde, Donde" and "Gritos".

The group released the single, "Los Mejo Que Vio En Ti", which made the Venezuela Top Ten in August 1967.

It was reported in the June 20, 1970, issue of Record World that their single "Por Alguien Como Tú" was threatening to become a break out single. It was also at no. 15 in the Latin American Hit Parade top 15. For the week of August 15, Record World now had it at no. 4.

In 1971, the group released the single, "Jesucristo" bw "Ahora Soy Feliz" on Top Hits H-3040 in Venezuela, and on Odeon SOM 145 in Mexico. It was credited to Victor Gamez con los Darts.

== Post Los Darts ==
Following the break up of the group, Victor Gámez had a career as a solo singer and in October 1971, his single "Yod Soy" was in the Venezuela Top Ten.

== Later years ==
In 1996, their album Grandes Exitos De Los Darts was released. It included the songs "Ahora Es Tarde", "Si Estas Triste", "Donde Donde", two Beatles songs; "Tú la vas a perder" ("You´re Going to Lose That Girl"), and “Aquí, allá y dónde sea” ("Here, There and Everywhere"), and seven others.

In 2010 four of the original members reunited, and the following year they released the album, Los Darts Hoy. They were original members; Claudio Gámez, Augusto de Lima, Ricardo Pimental and Richard Aumaitre. They were joined by Jorge Chapellin on vocals.
