= Top Hits (record label) =

- Parent company: Formerly part of Grupo Ricken
- Founded: 1960s
- Founder: Wilhelm Ricken
- Genre: Various
- Country of origin: Venezuela

Top Hits (also known as TH) was a Venezuelan record label. Major artists such as Los Darts, José Luis Rodríguez, Conexión, Azucar, Escena, Cacao Y Leche, Oscar D'León, Rudy Marquez and David Beigbeder recorded for the label. It was also a distributor for mainstream Western artists.

== Background ==
The label was founded and owned by Wilhelm Ricken who also presided over the Los Ruices, La Discoteca as well as the Cordica labels; Discomoda and Antor.

The label was responsible for José Luis's LP going to no. 1 in various South American countries as well as their Top Five sales lists. It even made an impression in some US territories.

In his Latin Notas section column in the March 22, 1986, issue of Billboard, Enrique Fernandez called the label powerful and independent.

Essex entertainment Inc. who became the owners of the Buddah Records, Inc. and Kama Sutra Records, Inc. catalogues published a notice in the November 9, 1991, issue of Billboard which included Discos Top Hits as one of their legitimate foreign licensees.

Wilhelm Ricken's key Lieutenant Carlos Vidal was the representative for Top Hits. In the United States West Coast, Pedro Mares was the label's chief of promotion.

== History ==
Music trade magazine Record World wrote in their July 3, 1971 issue that Top Hits had a group with potential to "make it all over". The group fronted by lead singer Edgar Castro was called Group C. That same year, Los Cazadores released their album The Hunters on Top Hits TH-1024. This was the first of six albums for the label.

In 1973, Los Darts had their Greatest Hits album issued on Top Hits THS 1043. Also the same year, Grupo Escena released their single, "Altamira" bw "Triste" which was produced by Rudy Márquez. It was released on Top Hits H-3236. A young Pecos Kanvas was a member of the group for some time. Escena would have an influence on a Dutch Moluccan band, Massada.

The single, "Prueba de amor" by Top Hits artist Tania was on no. 2 in the New York section of the Latin American Hit Parade chart for the week of December 21, 1974.

As of June 1978, artists with the label included Chery Jimiez, Oscar D'León, Tommy Olivencia, José Luis, Paquito Guzmán, Rudy Máquez, Henry Salvat, Três Tristes Tigres and Luis Enrique (Luis Enrique Hernández).

As of 1979, artists with the label included Mirla, Wladimir Y Su Constelacion, Emir Boscán, Luis Conny, la Banda, Los Cazadores, Delia, La Grande, Tania, La Critica, Tania, Grupo Acuario, Eddy Castro, Fernando Touzent, Luis Enríque, Tabaco Y Sus Metales, Trino Mora, Oscar D'León, José Luis Rodríguez, Henry Salvat, Los Tigres, Los Reales Brass, Noel Petro, Willie Salcedo, and Raquel.

Venezuelan group Los Cañoneros signed with the label after leaving their previous label that was owned by a German, Ernesto Aue. They left his label as they were seeking more musical freedom and came to Top Hits which was owned by another German, Wilhelm Ricken. their self-titled album was released in 1986.

By July, 1994, Paulo Moura had his album Rio Nocturnes released as did Mario Bauzá with his Tanga album and Seis Del Solar with their Decision album. Discos Top Hits was the Venezuelan distributor for the Messidor label artists albums.

It appears that in the 1990s, Alvaro Veli had purchased the catalogue of TH aka (Top Hits). He also bought other Venezuelan labels, Velvet, Sonografica, and Sonorodven.

== Wilhelm Ricken ==
Ricken acquired the Cuban record label, Panart Records in 1983.

Ricken also owned the five-studio complex, Intersonido in Venezuela.
