= Sajang é =

Song by Massada
- A-side: "Sajang é"
- B-side: "Impulse Of Rhythm"
- Published: Luma Music
- Released: 1980
- Songwriter(s): J. Manuhutu/, R. de Queljoe

Netherlands chronology
"Mother Of My Origine" (1980)	"Sajang é" (1980)	"Toto buang tomah" (1980)

Sajang é was a 1980 single for Dutch Latin rock group Massada. It became a number one hit for the group in the Netherlands.

== Background ==
"Sajang é" was the follow up to their single, "Mother Of My Origine" / "Ibu dari adzal-ku" that was released in 1980. The song backed with "Impulse Of Rhythm" was released on Kendari Records 2980 in the Netherlands in 1980. Side A was composed by Johnny Manuhutu and Rudy de Queljoe. The B side's composition was credited to Massada. It was released in Germany on Ariola 101 870, 101 870–100.

They followed up with "Toto buang tomah" the same year.

== Chart ==
The song made its debut in the Dutch charts at no. 47 on 15 March 1980. Music trade magazine Cash Box reported in their 3 May 1980 issue that "Sajang é" was at no 1 in the Dutch International Best Sellers, Top Ten 45s chart. It spent two weeks at that position. Spending a total of twelve weeks in the chart, its last entry was no. 49 on 31 May.
