= Anne-Fleur vakantie =

2023 single by Roxy Dekker

Single by Roxy Dekker

from the album Mama I Made It
- Released: 26 May 2023
- Genre: Nederpop
- Length: 2:54
- Label: Self-released
- Songwriter(s): Roxy Dekker
- Producer(s): Elke Tiel; Stas Swaczyna

Roxy Dekker singles chronology
"Heimwee" (2022)	"Anne-Fleur vakantie" (2023)	"Satisfyer" (2023)

"Anne-Fleur vakantie" (lit. 'Anne-Fleur holiday') is a song by Dutch singer and songwriter Roxy Dekker. It was written by Dekker, with production handled by Elke Tiel and Stas Swaczyna. The single was released on 26 May 2023 as the first single from her debut studio album Mama I Made It.

== Background ==
"Anne-Fleur vacation" was written by Roxy Dekker and produced by Elke Tiel and Stas Swaczyna. The song describes an "Anne-Fleur vacation". An "Anne-Fleur" is a term used on social media to describe a type of girl who acts like a snob and uses a lot of abbreviations in their spoken language. With the song, Dekker makes fun of girls who act like an "Anne-Fleur".

The song emerged from videos of Dekker on media platform TikTok. In it, she asked her followers for four different words, which she then used to write a song herself. During one of those challenges in March 2022, one of the followers asked to make a song with the words "colors", "sun", "Ibiza" and "mirror".

Dekker started with the chords of the song, after which she wrote the lyrics of the song. She posted a video on the platform, which was viewed tens of thousands of times and to which many followers responded to finish the song and release it. The singer herself initially doubted whether she wanted to release it, but eventually decided to send the song to a producer and finish it. The full song went viral on TikTok and other social media platforms after it was released, and is considered a cult hit.

== Commercial performance ==
Dekker had success with the song in the Dutch charts. It peaked at seventeenth place in the Single Top 100 in the fourteen weeks that it was in this list. It was not listed in the Top 40, but it reached eighth place in the Tipparade. As of 2024, the single has platinum status in the Netherlands.

== Charts ==
Weekly chart performance for "Anne-Fleur vakantie"
Chart (2023–2024)	Peak position
Netherlands (Single Top 100)	17

== Certifications ==
Region	Certification	Certified units/sales
Netherlands (NVPI)	Platinum	93,000^{‡}
^{‡} Sales+streaming figures based on certification alone.
