= Massada (band) =

Dutch funk, rock and pop band

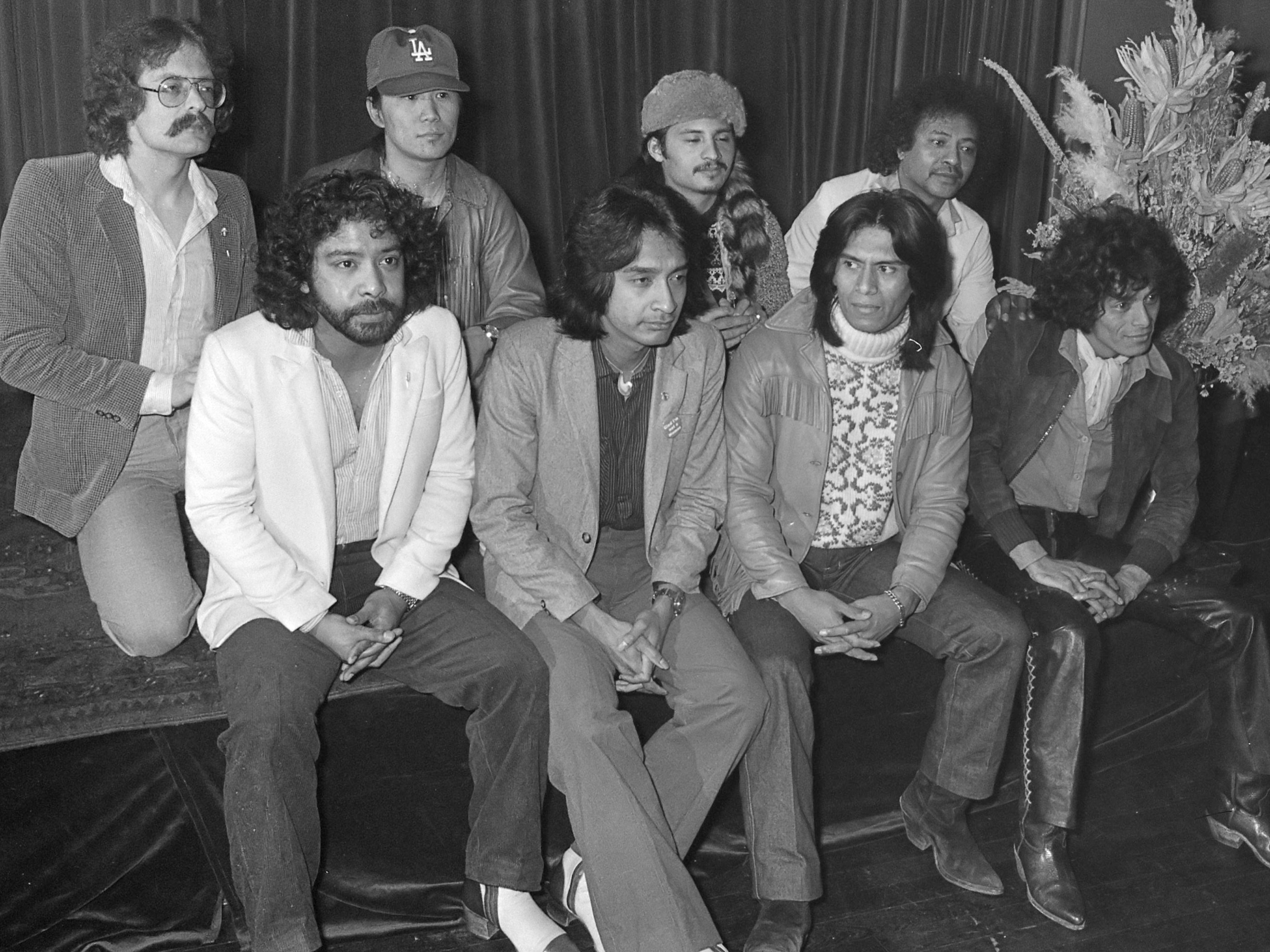
- Massada in 1979

Background information
- Origin: Holland
- Genres: Latin rock, pop
- Years active: 1970s - 1980s
- Labels: Kendari, Ariola, VIP, RCA, Sky
- Past members: Frans Eschauzier; Chris Latul; Nino Latuny; Eppy Manuhutu; Nippy Noya; Johnny Manuhutu; Zeth Mustamu; Usje Sabander
- Website: www.massada.nu

Massada was a Dutch band that had a funk, rock and pop background with Latin influences. They had several hits in the Netherlands, such as "Latin Dance", "Dansa (Don't Quit Dancing)" in 1978, "Unknown Destination" in 1979, "Feelin' Lonely", "Sajang é" and "I Never Had A Love Like This Before" in 1980.

== Background ==
The group was founded by Johnny Manuhutu. Much of the group were of Moluccan ethnicity.

According to the book in the 33⅓ series, Massada's Astaganaga by Lutgard Mutsaers, they had opportunities to record since 1975. But due to concessions, the group declined the offers. However, in 1978, things were set to change. Their debut album Astaganaga was released in that year. The two hit singles "Latin Dance" and "Dansa" are from that album. Both songs spent eight weeks on the Dutch charts, peaking at 17 and 23 respectively.

The group's influences include the groups Malo, Escena and El Chicano. Early on they were compared to Santana but at the time they were not familiar with the group.

== Career ==
=== 1980s ===
On the week of 3 May 1980, Cash Box showed that their single "Sajang é" was at no 1 in the Dutch International Best Sellers, Top Ten 45s chart. It had actually been at that position earlier.

It was reported by Cash Box in the 26 July 1980 issue that Massada were finialising their contract with their label Telstar Records. Their last album that was recorded at three different locations would be with the current label, however their next album would be produced and recorded by their own company.

They recorded the song "Vahevala" which was originally a hit for Loggins and Messina in 1972, and covered by Sugar Cane in 1979. Massada's version was backed with "Trust In Me" which was composed by De Queljoe, J. Manuhutu, and E. Manuhutu, and released in 1986. Music trade magazine Eurotipsheet reported that it was added to the playlist of Radio Veronica on the week of 1 March. It managed to peak at no. 14 on the Dutch Tipparade chart.

== Later years ==
Some five decades after their formation, they regrouped for a fifty-year anniversary tour in September 2023. The line up at that time was Johnny Manuhutu on lead vocals and percussion, Rudy de Queljoe on guitar, Julian Souisa on guitar, James Sabandar on bass, Alvin Manuhuw on drums, Jopie Manuhutu on timbales and percussion, Freddy Anindjola on keyboards and synthesizer, Daniël Bloem-Beretty on congas and percussion and Nippy Noya on congas and percussion.
