= Belong Together =

Single by Mark Ambor

from the album Rockwood
- Released: February 16, 2024
- Genre: Folk
- Length: 2:28
- Label: Hundred Days
- Songwriter: Mark Ambor
- Producers: Mark Ambor; Noel Zancanella

Mark Ambor singles chronology
| "I Hope It All Works Out" (2023) | "Belong Together" (2024) | "Our Way" (2024) |

Music video
- "Belong Together" on YouTube

"Belong Together" is a song by American singer Mark Ambor. It was released on February 16, 2024, through Hundred Days Records as the third single from Ambor's debut studio album, Rockwood. The song went viral on TikTok before its release. It became his first charting single, peaking in the top 10 in Austria, Germany, Ireland, the Netherlands, Norway and Switzerland, as well as the top 20 in Australia, New Zealand, Sweden and the United Kingdom.

== Background ==
Ahead of its release, Ambor had been teasing the song for weeks on his TikTok account. Two versions of the song went viral on the platform. The song reached the top 40 on the UK Singles Chart and numerous other countries in March 2024.

== Charts ==
=== Weekly charts ===
Weekly chart performance for "Belong Together"
| Chart (2024–2025) | Peak position |
|---|---|
| Australia (ARIA) | 18 |
| Austria (Ö3 Austria Top 40) | 5 |
| Belgium (Ultratop 50 Flanders) | 1 |
| Belgium (Ultratop 50 Wallonia) | 14 |
| Canada (Canadian Hot 100) | 24 |
| CIS Airplay (TopHit) | 40 |
| Croatia International Airplay (Top lista) | 21 |
| Czech Republic Airplay (ČNS IFPI) | 7 |
| Denmark (Tracklisten) | 27 |
| Estonia Airplay (TopHit) | 1 |
| Finland Airplay (Radiosoittolista) | 19 |
| France (SNEP) | 30 |
| Germany (GfK) | 7 |
| Global 200 (Billboard) | 21 |
| Greece International (IFPI) | 64 |
| Hungary (Editors' Choice Top 40) | 37 |
| Iceland (Tónlistinn) | 30 |
| Ireland (IRMA) | 6 |
| Italy (FIMI) | 87 |
| Latvia Airplay (LaIPA) | 13 |
| Lebanon (Lebanese Top 20) | 15 |
| Lithuania (AGATA) | 41 |
| Lithuania Airplay (TopHit) | 39 |
| Luxembourg (Billboard) | 14 |
| Netherlands (Dutch Top 40) | 1 |
| Netherlands (Single Top 100) | 4 |
| New Zealand (Recorded Music NZ) | 20 |
| Norway (VG-lista) | 7 |
| Norway Airplay (IFPI Norge) | 3 |
| Poland (Polish Airplay Top 100) | 1 |
| Poland (Polish Streaming Top 100) | 59 |
| Portugal (AFP) | 61 |
| Romania Airplay (TopHit) | 65 |
| San Marino Airplay (SMRTV Top 50) | 5 |
| Slovakia Airplay (ČNS IFPI) | 1 |
| Slovenia Airplay (Radiomonitor) | 6 |
| South Africa (Billboard) | 24 |
| Spain (Promusicae) | 95 |
| Sweden (Sverigetopplistan) | 12 |
| Switzerland (Schweizer Hitparade) | 5 |
| Turkey International Airplay (Radiomonitor Türkiye) | 3 |
| Ukraine Airplay (TopHit) | 9 |
| UK Singles (Official Charts) | 11 |
| UK Indie (Official Charts) | 40 |
| US Billboard Hot 100 | 74 |
| US Adult Pop Airplay (Billboard) | 11 |
| US Pop Airplay (Billboard) | 18 |

=== Monthly charts ===
Monthly chart performance for "Belong Together"
| Chart (2024–2025) | Peak position |
|---|---|
| CIS Airplay (TopHit) | 45 |
| Czech Republic (Rádio Top 100) | 11 |
| Estonia Airplay (TopHit) | 1 |
| Lithuania Airplay (TopHit) | 50 |
| Romania Airplay (TopHit) | 69 |
| Slovakia (Rádio Top 100) | 1 |
| Ukraine Airplay (TopHit) | 12 |

=== Year-end charts ===
2024 year-end chart performance for "Belong Together"
| Chart (2024) | Position |
|---|---|
| Australia (ARIA) | 48 |
| Austria (Ö3 Austria Top 40) | 6 |
| Belgium (Ultratop Flanders) | 4 |
| Canada (Canadian Hot 100) | 56 |
| CIS Airplay (TopHit) | 115 |
| Estonia Airplay (TopHit) | 29 |
| France (SNEP) | 86 |
| Germany (GfK) | 9 |
| Global 200 (Billboard) | 105 |
| Netherlands (Dutch Top 40) | 15 |
| Netherlands (Single Top 100) | 12 |
| New Zealand (Recorded Music NZ) | 48 |
| Poland (Polish Airplay Top 100) | 11 |
| Sweden (Sverigetopplistan) | 48 |
| Switzerland (Schweizer Hitparade) | 6 |
| UK Singles (OCC) | 27 |

2025 year-end chart performance for "Belong Together"
| Chart (2025) | Position |
|---|---|
| Austria (Ö3 Austria Top 40) | 54 |
| Belgium (Ultratop 50 Flanders) | 47 |
| Belgium (Ultratop 50 Wallonia) | 106 |
| CIS Airplay (TopHit) | 199 |
| Estonia Airplay (TopHit) | 111 |
| Germany (GfK) | 57 |
| Poland (Polish Airplay Top 100) | 91 |
| Switzerland (Schweizer Hitparade) | 52 |
| US Adult Pop Airplay (Billboard) | 49 |

== Certifications ==
Certifications for "Belong Together"
| Region | Certification | Certified units/sales |
|---|---|---|
| Australia (ARIA) | 2× Platinum | 140,000^{‡} |
| Austria (IFPI Austria) | Platinum | 30,000^{‡} |
| Belgium (BRMA) | 2× Platinum | 80,000^{‡} |
| Canada (Music Canada) | 2× Platinum | 160,000^{‡} |
| Denmark (IFPI Danmark) | Platinum | 90,000^{‡} |
| France (SNEP) | Diamond | 333,333^{‡} |
| Germany (BVMI) | Gold | 300,000^{‡} |
| Italy (FIMI) | Gold | 50,000^{‡} |
| Netherlands (NVPI) | Gold | 46,500^{‡} |
| New Zealand (RMNZ) | 2× Platinum | 60,000^{‡} |
| Poland (ZPAV) | Platinum | 50,000^{‡} |
| Spain (Promusicae) | Platinum | 60,000^{‡} |
| Switzerland (IFPI Switzerland) | 2× Platinum | 60,000^{‡} |
| United Kingdom (BPI) | 2× Platinum | 1,200,000^{‡} |
| United States (RIAA) | Platinum | 1,000,000^{‡} |
^{‡} Sales+streaming figures based on certification alone.
