= Mark Ambor =

American singer-songwriter (born 1997)

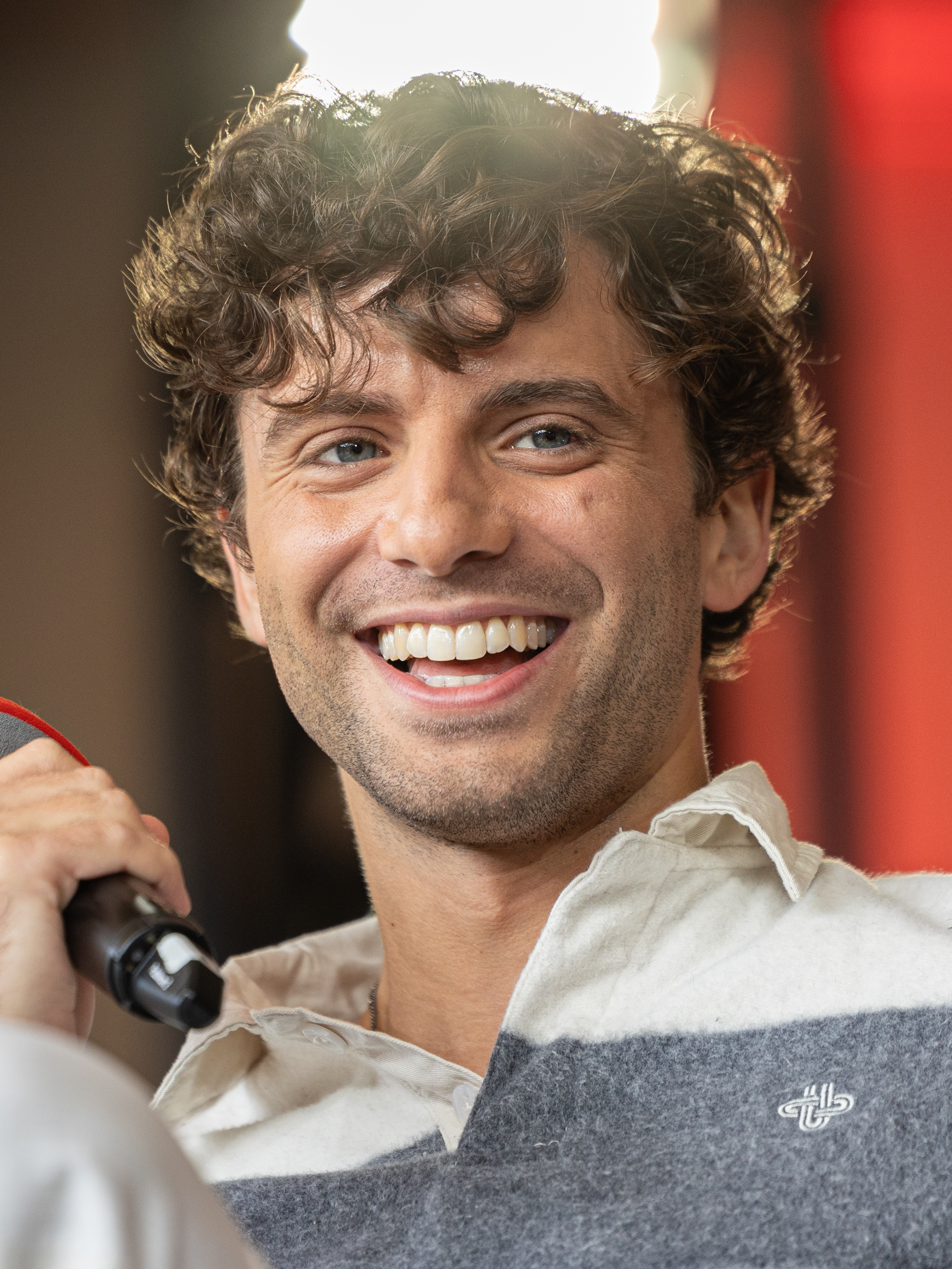
- Ambor at the SWR3 New Pop Festival 2024

Background information
- Born: Mark Gregory Damboragian; December 4, 1997 (age 28); Pleasantville, New York, U.S.
- Origin: New York City, U.S.
- Genres: Folk
- Occupations: Musician; singer; songwriter
- Instruments: Vocals; piano; guitar
- Years active: 2019–present
- Label: Hundred Days
- Website: markambor.com

Mark Gregory Damboragian (born December 4, 1997), known professionally as Mark Ambor, is an American singer-songwriter. He is best known for his 2024 single "Belong Together".

== Career ==
=== 2019–2022: Career beginnings and early EPs ===
Ambor released his debut single "Fever" in April 2019. An EP Colorful was released in September 2019. Mimi Loughlin from Fairfield Mirror said "it's clear that he has an affinity for creating catchy, musically upbeat songs that hit home at the core of listeners' emotions". In October 2020, Ambor released the single "It's Us Again"

In September 2021, Ambor released “The Long Way”. This was followed by "Company" in November 2021, "Waves" in March 2022 "Hair Toss, Arms Crossed" in April 2022 and "Don't You Worry" in July 2022. In September 2022, Ambor released the EP Hello World, which he called his "debut EP".

=== 2023–present: Rockwood ===
"Curls in the Wind" was released in July 2023. This was followed by "Good to Be" in October 2023 and "I Hope It All Works Out" in November 2023.

In February 2024, Ambor released "Belong Together". The single debuted at 167 on Billboard's global chart outside the U.S. with 8.2 million non-US streams and at 88 on the Canadian Hot 100. The single charted at 87 on Billboard Hot 100 with 7 million U.S. streams. The single charted at number one in the Netherlands in July 2024 (Dutch Top 40).

In June 2024, Ambor announced the release of his debut studio album Rockwood, which released on August 16, 2024.

== Discography ==
=== Studio albums ===
List of studio albums, with selected details, peak chart positions and certifications
| Title | Details | Peak chart positions | | | | | Certifications |
| Title | Details | US Heat. | BEL (FL) | GER | NLD | NOR | Certifications |
|---|---|---|---|---|---|---|---|
| Rockwood | Released: August 16, 2024; Label: Hundred Days Records; Format: CD, digital download, streaming | 6 | 52 | 99 | 22 | 35 | BEA: Gold; NVPI: Gold |

=== Extended plays ===
List of EPs, with selected details
| Title | Details |
|---|---|
| Colorful | Released: September 25, 2019; Format: Digital download, streaming |
| Hello World | Released: September 9, 2022; Label: Hundred Days Records; Format: Digital download, streaming |

=== Singles ===
List of singles, with selected peak chart positions and certifications, showing year released and album name
| Title | Year | Peak chart positions | | | | | | | | | | Certifications | Album |
| Title | Year | US | AUS | AUT | BEL (FL) | CAN | GER | IRE | NLD | SWI | UK | Certifications | Album |
|---|---|---|---|---|---|---|---|---|---|---|---|---|---|
| "Fever" | 2019 | — | — | — | — | — | — | — | — | — | — | | Colorful |
| "It's Us Again" | 2020 | — | — | — | — | — | — | — | — | — | — | | Non-album single |
| "The Long Way" | 2021 | — | — | — | — | — | — | — | — | — | — | | Hello World |
| "Company" | 2021 | — | — | — | — | — | — | — | — | — | — | | Hello World |
| "Waves" | 2022 | — | — | — | — | — | — | — | — | — | — | | Hello World |
| "Hair Toss, Arms Crossed" | 2022 | — | — | — | — | — | — | — | — | — | — | | Hello World |
| "Don't You Worry" | 2022 | — | — | — | — | — | — | — | — | — | — | | Hello World |
| "Curls in the Wind" | 2023 | — | — | — | — | — | — | — | — | — | — | | Non-album single |
| "Good to Be" | 2023 | — | — | — | 10 | — | — | — | 24 | — | — | BEA: Gold; MC: Gold; NVPI: Gold | Rockwood |
| "I Hope It All Works Out" | 2023 | — | — | — | 28 | — | — | — | — | — | — | | Rockwood |
| "Belong Together" | 2024 | 74 | 18 | 5 | 1 | 24 | 7 | 6 | 4 | 5 | 11 | RIAA: Platinum; ARIA: 2× Platinum; BEA: 2× Platinum; BPI: 2× Platinum; BVMI: Gold; IFPI AUT: Platinum; IFPI SWI: 2× Platinum; MC: 2× Platinum; NVPI: Gold | Rockwood |
| "Our Way" | 2024 | — | — | — | — | — | — | — | — | — | — | | Rockwood |
| "Someone That's Better" | 2024 | — | — | — | — | — | — | — | — | — | — | | Rockwood |
| "Run Rudolph Run" | 2024 | 78 | 36 | — | — | 56 | — | 9 | 96 | — | 31 | | Non-album single |
| "Who Knows" | 2025 | — | — | — | — | — | — | — | — | — | — | | TBA |
| "New York Confident" | 2026 | — | — | — | — | — | — | — | — | — | — | | TBA |
"—" denotes a recording that did not chart or was not released in that territory.
