= Roxy Dekker =

Dutch singer and songwriter (born 2005)

- Roxy Dekker op de Lokerse Feesten

Background information
- Born: 12 January 2005 (age 21); Amsterdam, Netherlands
- Genres: Pop; Europop; dance-pop
- Occupations: Singer; songwriter; TikToker
- Years active: 2019–present
- Label: Warner Music Benelux

Roxy Dekker (born 12 January 2005) is a Dutch singer, songwriter and TikToker.

== Early life ==
Roxy Dekker was born on 12 January 2005 in Amsterdam. Dekker graduated high school in 2023.

== Career ==
Dekker participated in Junior Songfestival in 2019, the Dutch national final for the Junior Eurovision Song Contest 2019, where she was part of the group 6Times with the song "End of Time". The group finished runners-up.

In 2021, Dekker launched her solo career. She sings covers of songs on TikTok, among others. Partly due to this platform, she has already managed to achieve quite a few streams with her singles "Heimwee" and "Spijt".

In 2023, Dekker came up with a concept on TikTok where her followers could submit four words under her videos. When a follower left the words "colours", "sun", "Ibiza" and "mirror", Dekker decided to turn this into a song. Ultimately, the song "Anne-Fleur vakantie" emerged from this. It didn't take long for this song to become popular on the TikTok platform, making it a hit; the single reached 5th place in the Top 50 and managed to reach the Tipparade. In November 2023, Dekker released the single Satisfyer. This single, whose name is a nod to the sex toy of the same name, more than equaled the success of Anne-Fleur vakantie. It even reached ninth place on the Dutch Top 40. On 21 December 2023, Dekker was a guest on 3FM Serious Request.

At the Edisons 2024, on 4 March 2024, Dekker's breakthrough was rewarded with her first Edison Award. She won the prize in the category for best newcomer. On 21 March, she was named 3FM Talent during the 3FM Awards. On 4 April 2024, Dekker released the single "Sugardaddy". This single was teased on TikTok for over a month and quickly went viral there. On 12 April, "Sugardaddy" managed to enter at number one on the Dutch Top 40, thus giving Dekker her first number-one hit. On 7 June, Dekker released another new single in collaboration with Bankzitters dubbed "Huisfeestje". On 12 July, Dekker then released another single, this time with Ronnie Flex, entitled Gaan we weg?. On 27 July, this new single also reached number 1, which was her second number 1 hit in the Dutch Top 40. Her next single was "Industry Plant", in which she responded to hateful reactions. This also peaked at number 1 in the Single Top 100. In 2025, the single "Ga dan!" followed, which Dekker also teased for a while before its release. With the latter song, Dekker scored her fifth number 1 hit, in a row, in the Single Top 100.

On 7 March 2025, Dekker released her debut album Mama I Made It. In the week following its release, eight songs from the album were in the Dutch top ten on Spotify. Casual and Jouw idee were released as the seventh and eighth singles from the album.

== Personal life ==
On 3 May 2024, Dekker announced that she is in a relationship with Koen van Heest, a member of the Bankzitters.

== Discography ==
=== Albums ===
List of albums, with selected peak chart positions
Title	Details	Peak chart positions	
Title	Details	NLD	BEL (FL)
Mama I Made It	Released: 6 March 2025; Label: Warner; Formats: Digital download, streaming	1	1
Superstar	Released: 20 August 2026; Label: Warner; Formats: Digital download, streaming	1	27

=== Singles ===
==== As lead artist ====
List of singles as lead artist, with selected peak chart positions and certifications
Title	Year	Peak chart positions			Certification	Album
Title	Year	NLD 40	NLD 100	BEL (FL)	Certification	Album
"Begin met jou"	2021	—	—	—		Non-album singles
"Spijt"	2022	—	—	—		Non-album singles
"Heimwee"	2022	—	—	—		Non-album singles
"Anne-Fleur vakantie"	2023	— (Note: "Anne-Fleur vakantie" did not enter the Dutch Top 40, but peaked at number 8 on the Tipparade chart.)	17	—	NVPI: Platinum	Mama I Made It
"Satisfyer"	2023	9	4	—	NVPI: Diamond	Mama I Made It
"Sugardaddy"	2024	1	1	8	NVPI: Diamond	Mama I Made It
"Gaan we weg?" (with Ronnie Flex)	2024	1	1	37	NVPI: Platinum	Mama I Made It
"Industry Plant"	2024	17	1	—	NVPI: Gold	Mama I Made It
"Ga dan!"	2025	2	1	38	NVPI: Gold	Mama I Made It
"Casual"	2025	9	1	—	NVPI: Gold	Mama I Made It
"Jouw idee"	2025	21	2	31	NVPI: Platinum	Mama I Made It
"Hoe het is" (featuring Idaly and Ronnie Flex)	2025	4	2	—	NVPI: Platinum	Non-album singles
"Go Bestfriend"	2025	31	6	—		Non-album singles
"Loser"	2025	6	5	—	NVPI: Gold	Non-album singles
"Cool"	2025	—	27	—		Non-album singles
"Down 4 Whatever"	2025	—	81	—		Non-album singles
"Superstar"	2026	13	4	—		Superstar
"Bare Minimum"	2026	13	10	—		Superstar
"—" denotes a recording that did not chart or was not released in that territory.

==== As featured artist ====
List of singles as featured artist, with selected peak chart positions and certifications
Title	Year	Peak chart positions			Certification	Album
Title	Year	NLD 40	NLD 100	BEL (FL)	Certification	Album
"Huisfeestje" (Bankzitters featuring Roxy Dekker)	2024	2	1	38	NVPI: Platinum	Non-album singles
"Jij hebt mij" (Kevin featuring Roxy Dekker)	2026	4	1	—		Non-album singles

=== Other charted songs ===
List of other charted songs, with selected peak chart positions
Title	Year	Peak chart positions	Album
Title	Year	NLD 100	Album
"Wauw"	2026	16	Superstar
