= Sugardaddy (song) =

2024 single by Roxy Dekker

Single by Roxy Dekker

from the album Mama I Made It
- Released: 4 April 2024
- Genre: Nederpop
- Length: 2:11
- Label: Warner Music Benelux
- Songwriters: Beer Petrie; Julian Vahle; Renske te Buck; Roxy Dekker
- Producer: Julian Vahle

Roxy Dekker singles chronology
"Satisfyer" (2024)	"Sugardaddy" (2024)	"Huisfeestje" (2024)

"Sugardaddy" is a song by Dutch singer and songwriter Roxy Dekker. The single was released on 4 April 2024 as the third single from her debut studio album, Mama I Made It.

== Background ==
Sugardaddy was written by Julian Vahle, Beer Petrie, Renske te Buck and Roxy Dekker. It is a song in the Nederpop genre. The song was written at a writing camp in Friesland. Prior to the release, Dekker teased the song for five weeks. She did this on the TikTok platform and at various festivals. At the Paaspop festival, the song was well received and sung along to the loudest of all Dekker's songs. On 4 April 2024, Dekker released the song on Domien Verschuuren's afternoon show at Qmusic. That same evening, she was also a guest on the talk show Beau.

In the song, Dekker turns the tables. A 'sugardaddy' is a man who pays for everything for a woman. In the song, however, Dekker sings that she, as a woman, will pay for this for her boyfriend. This is expressed, among other things, when Dekker sings about 'Roxy Ro pays the bill', which is a nod to a joke within Dekker's group of friends. This makes Dekker the 'sugardaddy'.

Sugardaddy immediately reached the first place in the Top 50 of most streamed songs on the music platform Spotify with several hundred thousand streams. On iTunes, the song managed to reach the first place in the download list. On YouTube, the song became trending, despite the fact that listeners only get to see Dekker's side.

== Commercial performance ==
On 12 April 2024, Sugardaddy entered the Dutch Top 40 in first place in the first week that the song was on the list. It thus became Dekker's first number 1 hit in the Top 40.

== Charts ==
=== Weekly charts ===
Weekly chart performance for "Sugardaddy"
Chart (2024)	Peak position
Belgium (Ultratop 50 Flanders)	8
Netherlands (Dutch Top 40)	1
Netherlands (Single Top 100)	1

=== Year-end charts ===
Year-end chart performance for "Sugardaddy"
Chart (2025)	Position
Belgium (Ultratop 50 Flanders)	104

== Certifications ==
Region	Certification	Certified units/sales
Netherlands (NVPI)	Diamond	232,500^{‡}
^{‡} Sales+streaming figures based on certification alone.
