= Antoon (singer) =

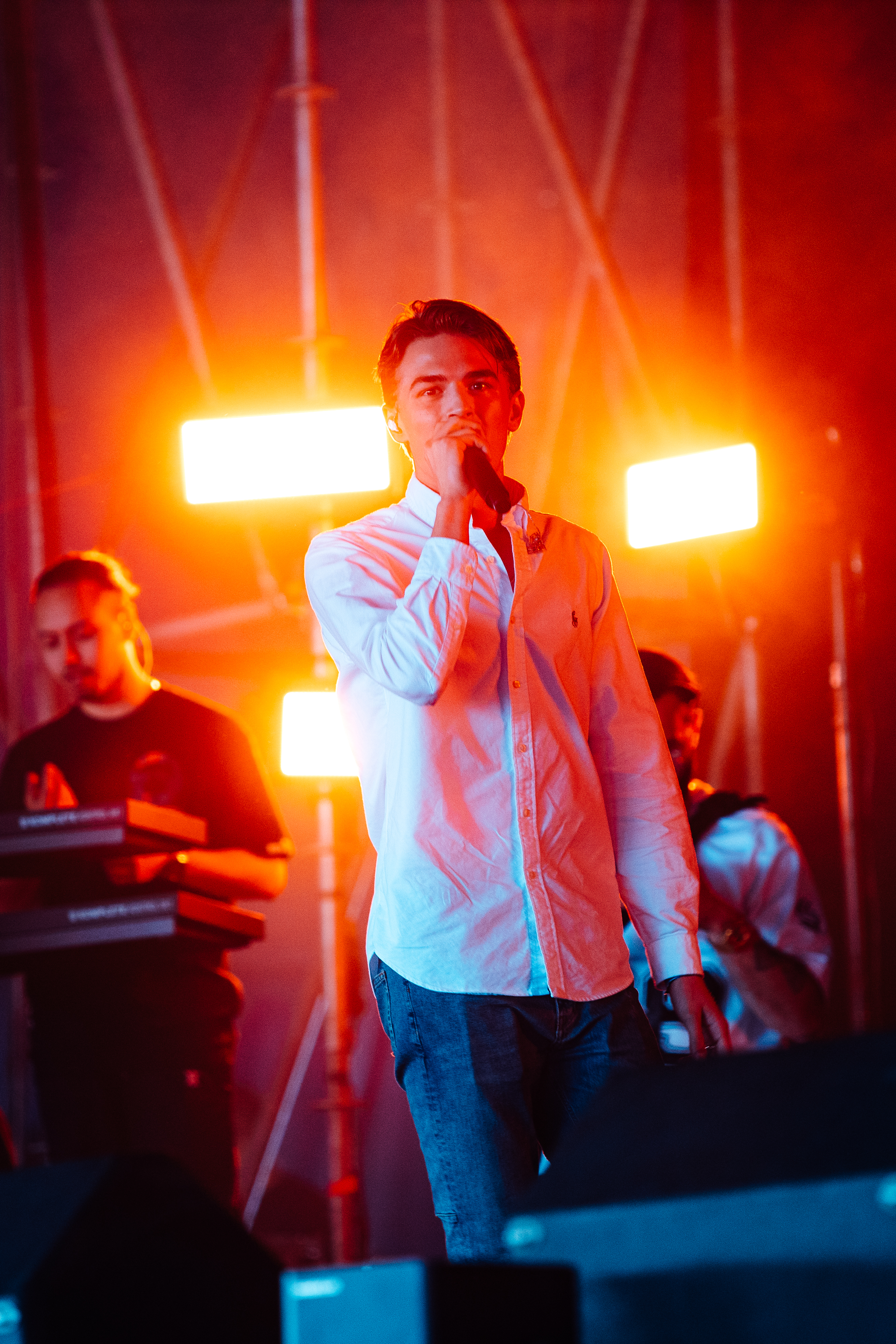
- Antoon performing at Hello Festival in 2022

Background information
- Born: Valentijn Antoon Remmert Verkerk; February 11, 2002 (age 24); Hoorn, Netherlands
- Genres: hip-hop; pop
- Occupations: Singer, rapper, producer, songwriter
- Instruments: singer, rapper, drums, classical piano
- Years active: 2020–present
- Labels: Atlantic Record Benelux; Dreamteam Music

Valentijn Antoon Remmert "Tijn" Verkerk (born 11 February 2002), known professionally as Antoon, is a Dutch singer, rapper, music producer and songwriter. He first rose to popularity with his 2020 single "Hyperventilatie", which became a hit on TikTok. He has released three studio albums since; De nacht is van ons in 2020, Engel in 2022, and Tot het eind van mij in 2026. In 2022, Antoon was the most streamed artist in the Netherlands.

== Early life ==
Valentijn Verkerk was born on 11 February 2002 in Hoorn and grew up in Midwoud, North Holland. He was involved with music from a young age and started playing drums and classical piano from an early age. His parents recognized their son's musical talent early on and actively supported him, including by traveling all over the country together from the moment he was first booked as a DJ. This started when he was just thirteen years old. At the age of 15, he dropped out of secondary school and was accepted into the Herman Brood Academy, becoming the youngest student ever accepted there.

== Music career ==
As a DJ and producer, Verkerk began his career by focusing primarily on EDM productions, but he developed his style by integrating hip hop and adding his own lyrics. At the Herman Brood Academy, he became acquainted with Twan van Steenhoven, known from his role in Big2 and The Opposites.

In May 2020, Antoon signed with Dreamteam Music, and rose to popularity when his first single, "Hyperventilatie", which was released in June 2020, went viral on the social media platform TikTok.

Antoon's first album, De nacht is van ons, was released in 2020. That same year, he released the EP Heilig water together with Big2. In 2021, he released several singles. In 2022, Antoon was nominated for the Edison 'Newcomer' award. He participated in the online television program Het Jachtseizoen by StukTV that year. In late 2022, he performed at the Ziggo Dome, and became the most streamed artist of 2022 on Spotify in the Netherlands. The song "Vluchtstrook", featuring Kris Kross Amsterdam and Sigourney K, became the most streamed single of 2022 in the Netherlands.

In 2023, he received the Qmusic Top 40 Award for 'Best National Artist' and the Edison in the pop category. That same year, the musical film "Antoon - Engel" was made about him, for which he was awarded the 'Kristallen Film' award.

Antoon signed with Atlantic Records Benelux in 2023.

In November 2025, Antoon released the song "Tot het eind van mij" as a tribute to his deceased mother. In January 2026, Antoon released his third studio album, Tot het eind van mij.

== Personal life ==
Just before Antoon's breakthrough in 2020, his mother died of cancer. In the song "Onweer", he sings about the loss of his mother. His father works for him as a manager. He has an older and a younger sister.

== Discography ==
=== Studio albums ===
Title	Release date	Peak chart positions		Details
Title	Release date	BEL (FL)	NLD	Details
De nacht is van ons	17 July 2020	—	7	*Label: Dreamteam *NVPI: Gold
Engel	21 April 2023	188	24	*Label: Dreamteam *NVPI: 3× Platinum
Tot het eind van mij	16 January 2026	—	7	* Label: Atlantic Records Benelux NVPI: Gold

=== EPs ===
Title	Release date	Peak chart positions		Details
Title	Release date	BEL (FL)	NLD	Details
Heilig water	27 November 2020	—	—	*Label: Dreamteam *NVPI: Gold
Hallo (Antoon)	4 March 2022	—	—	*Label: Dreamteam *NVPI: Gold

=== Singles ===
Title	Year	Peak chart positions			Certification	Album
Title	Year	BEL (FL)	NLD (40)	NLD (100)	Certification	Album
"Hyperventilatie"	2020	—	11	4	NVPI: 2 x Platinum	De nacht is van ons
"Disco duivel" (with Big2)	2020	tip	tip17	—		Heilig water (EP)
"Leuk" (with Big2)	2020	—	33	18	NVPI: 2 x Platinum	Engel
"Bootje" (with Paul Sinha)	2021	—	tip4	23	NVPI: Platinum	Engel
"Zo ben jij" (with Sterre)	2021	—	tip18	52	NVPI: Gold	Engel
"Vluchtstrook" (with Kris Kross Amsterdam & Sigourney K)	2021	2	2	1	NVPI: 3 x Platinum	Engel, Echte meisjes huilen niet (Kris Kross Amsterdam Album)
"Hallo"	2022	—	1	1	NVPI: Platinum	Engel
"Hotelschool"	2022	—	18	2	NVPI: Platinum	Engel
"Tantoe lekker" (with Big2)	2022	—	tip6	5	NVPI: Gold	Engel
"Olivia"	2022	—	5	1 (2 wkn)	NVPI: Platinum	Engel
"Centraal Station" (with Bilal Wahib)	2022	—	tip13	12	NVPI: Gold	Engel
"Remedy" (with Josylvio)	2022	—	—	28		Engel
"Echo" (with Big2)	2022	—	tip6	72		Lima (Big2 Album)
"Soms" (with Josylvio)	2022	—	tip10	21		Vallen En Opstaan (Josylvio Album)
"Klop klop"	2022	—	13	8		Engel
"Meteoriet" (with Dopebwoy)	2022	—	33	14		Engel
"Roddels" (with Frenna)	2023	—	tip7	32		Engel
"Sliden" (with Ronnie Flex)	2023	—	28	9	NVPI: Gold	Sliden (EP)
"Bassline" (with Ronnie Flex)	2023	—	—	74		Sliden (EP)
"Blindelings"	2024	32	19	19		Gezichten (EP)
"Doe maar"	2024	—	tip19	—		Gezichten (EP)
"Gezichten" (with Kevin)	2024	—	—	47		Gezichten (EP)
"Ça va" (with Big2 & Bilal Wahib)	2024	—	tip6	29		—
"After six" (with Broederliefde & Ronnie Flex)	2024	—	tip14	26		—
"Vleugels" (with Kris Kross Amsterdam & Zoë Tauran)	2024	—	39	36		—
"ChinChin" (with Ronnie Flex, Lil Kleine, Kraantje Pappie & ADF Samski	2024	—	39	10		—
"Beetje van mij"	2025	—	2	1	NVPI: Platinum	Tot het eind van mij
"Chaos"	2025	—	tip22	63		Tot het eind van mij
"3D"	2025	—	tip11	81		Tot het eind van mij
"Knalprobleem" (with Milolaathetlukken)	2025	—	tip17	36		Tot het eind van mij
"Tot het eind van mij"	2025	—	32	20		Tot het eind van mij
"Vergeten" (with Gotu Jim)	2026	—	—	92		–
"De enige"	2026	27	24	27		–
"100 tranen" (with Qlas & Boef)	2026	—	tip30	1		–
