= List of Dutch Top 40 number-one singles of 2009 =

This is a list of the Dutch Top 40 number-one singles of 2009. The Dutch Top 40 is a chart that ranks the best-performing singles of the Netherlands. Published by radio station Radio 538.

== Chart history ==
| Issue date | Song | Artist(s) | Reference(s) |
|---|---|---|---|
| 3 January | "Hot n Cold" | Katy Perry | |
| 10 January | "Hot n Cold" | Katy Perry | |
| 17 January | "Ayo Technology" | Milow | |
| 24 January | "Ayo Technology" | Milow | |
| 31 January | "Ayo Technology" | Milow | |
| 7 February | "Ayo Technology" | Milow | |
| 14 February | "Rap das Armas" | Cidinho & Doca | |
| 21 February | "Rap das Armas" | Cidinho & Doca | |
| 28 February | "Just Dance" | Lady Gaga featuring Colby O'Donis | |
| 7 March | "Just Dance" | Lady Gaga featuring Colby O'Donis | |
| 14 March | "Miracle" | Ilse DeLange | |
| 21 March | "Miracle" | Ilse DeLange | |
| 28 March | "Poker Face" | Lady Gaga | |
| 4 April | "Poker Face" | Lady Gaga | |
| 11 April | "Poker Face" | Lady Gaga | |
| 18 April | "Poker Face" | Lady Gaga | |
| 25 April | "Poker Face" | Lady Gaga | |
| 2 May | "Poker Face" | Lady Gaga | |
| 9 May | "Poker Face" | Lady Gaga | |
| 16 May | "Poker Face" | Lady Gaga | |
| 23 May | "Hallelujah" | Lisa | |
| 30 May | "Hallelujah" | Lisa | |
| 6 June | "Hallelujah" | Lisa | |
| 13 June | "Hallelujah" | Lisa | |
| 20 June | "Beggin'" | Madcon | |
| 27 June | "Beggin'" | Madcon | |
| 4 July | "I Know You Want Me (Calle Ocho)" | Pitbull | |
| 11 July | "I Know You Want Me (Calle Ocho)" | Pitbull | |
| 18 July | "I Know You Want Me (Calle Ocho)" | Pitbull | |
| 25 July | "I Know You Want Me (Calle Ocho)" | Pitbull | |
| 1 August | "I Know You Want Me (Calle Ocho)" | Pitbull | |
| 8 August | "I Gotta Feeling" | Black Eyed Peas | |
| 15 August | "I Gotta Feeling" | Black Eyed Peas | |
| 22 August | "Mi Rowsu (Tuintje In Mijn Hart)" | Damaru & Jan Smit | |
| 29 August | "Mi Rowsu (Tuintje In Mijn Hart)" | Damaru & Jan Smit | |
| 5 September | "Mi Rowsu (Tuintje In Mijn Hart)" | Damaru & Jan Smit | |
| 12 September | "Three Days in a Row" | Anouk | |
| 19 September | "Three Days in a Row" | Anouk | |
| 26 September | "Three Days in a Row" | Anouk | |
| 3 October | "Three Days in a Row" | Anouk | |
| 10 October | "Evacuate the Dancefloor" | Cascada | |
| 17 October | "Evacuate the Dancefloor" | Cascada | |
| 24 October | "Bodies" | Robbie Williams | |
| 31 October | "Bodies" | Robbie Williams | |
| 7 November | "Bodies" | Robbie Williams | |
| 14 November | "Bodies" | Robbie Williams | |
| 21 November | "Stereo Love" | Edward Maya featuring Vika Jigulina | |
| 28 November | "Stereo Love" | Edward Maya featuring Vika Jigulina | |
| 5 December | "Just Say Yes" | Snow Patrol | |
| 12 December | "Just Say Yes" | Snow Patrol | |
| 19 December | "Just Say Yes" | Snow Patrol | |
| 26 December | "Fireflies" | Owl City | |

== Number-one artists ==
| Position | Artist | Weeks #1 |
|---|---|---|
| 1 | Lady Gaga | 10 |
| 2 | Pitbull | 5 |
| 3 | Milow | 4 |
| 3 | Lisa | 4 |
| 3 | Anouk | 4 |
| 3 | Robbie Williams | 4 |
| 4 | Damaru | 3 |
| 4 | Jan Smit | 3 |
| 4 | Snow Patrol | 3 |
| 5 | Katy Perry | 2 |
| 5 | Cidinho & Doca | 2 |
| 5 | Colby O'Donis | 2 |
| 5 | Ilse DeLange | 2 |
| 5 | Madcon | 2 |
| 5 | Black Eyed Peas | 2 |
| 5 | Cascada | 2 |
| 5 | Edward Maya | 2 |
| 5 | Vika Jigulina | 2 |
| 6 | Owl City | 1 |

== See also ==
- 2009 in music
- List of number-one hits (Netherlands)
