= List of Dutch Top 40 number-one singles of 2011 =

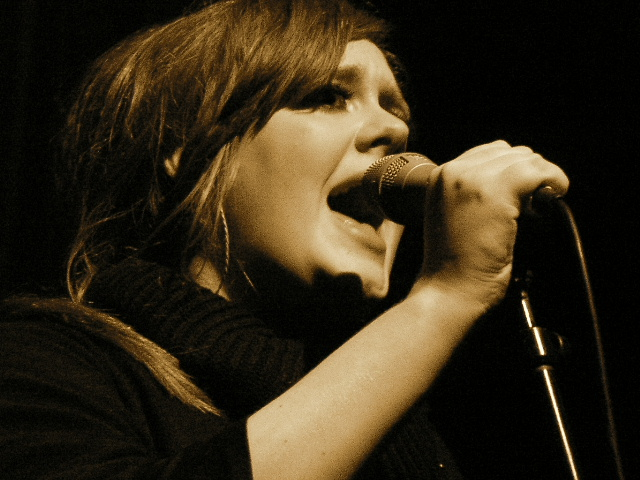
With her singles "Rolling in the Deep" and "Set Fire to the Rain", Adele became the first artist since 1974 to hold the number-one position in the Dutch Top 40 with two songs consecutively.

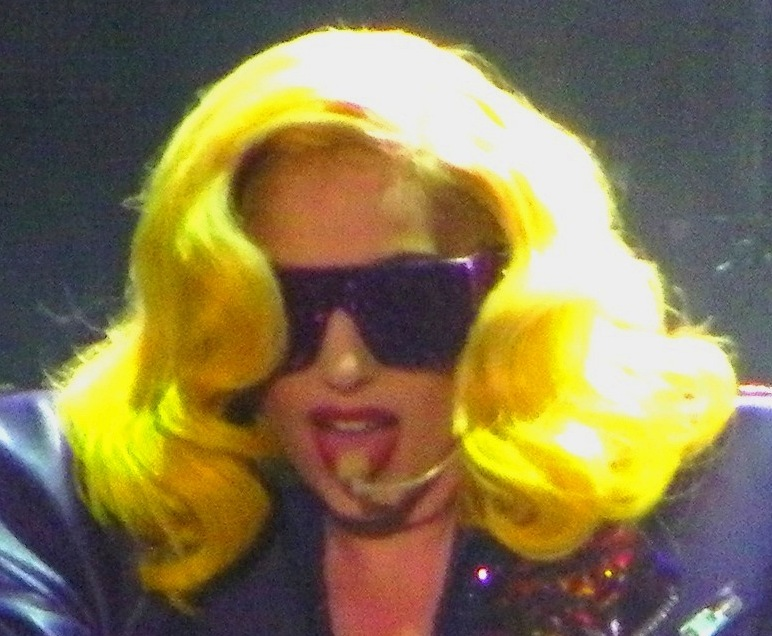
Lady Gaga became, with her single "Born This Way", the first artist since 2009 that debuted at the number-one position in the Dutch Top 40.

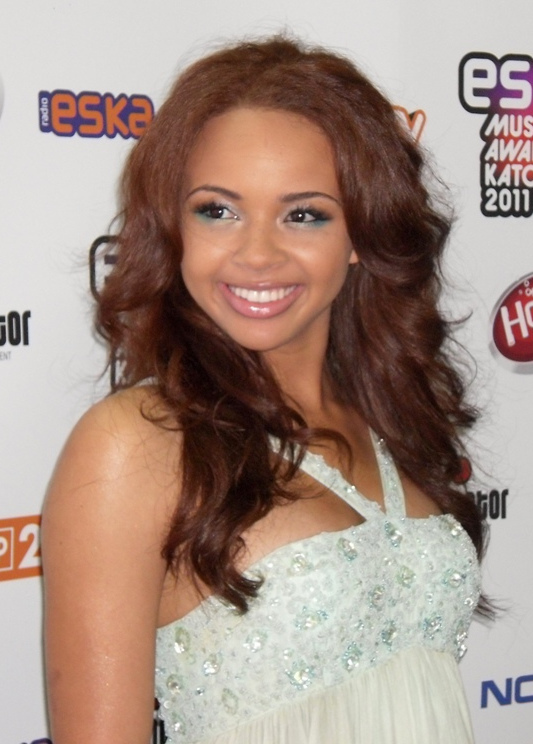
Alexis Jordan scored her first number-one hit in the Dutch Top 40 this year. Her song "Happiness" spent ten weeks at the top of the chart, making it the song that stayed the most weeks on number one this year.

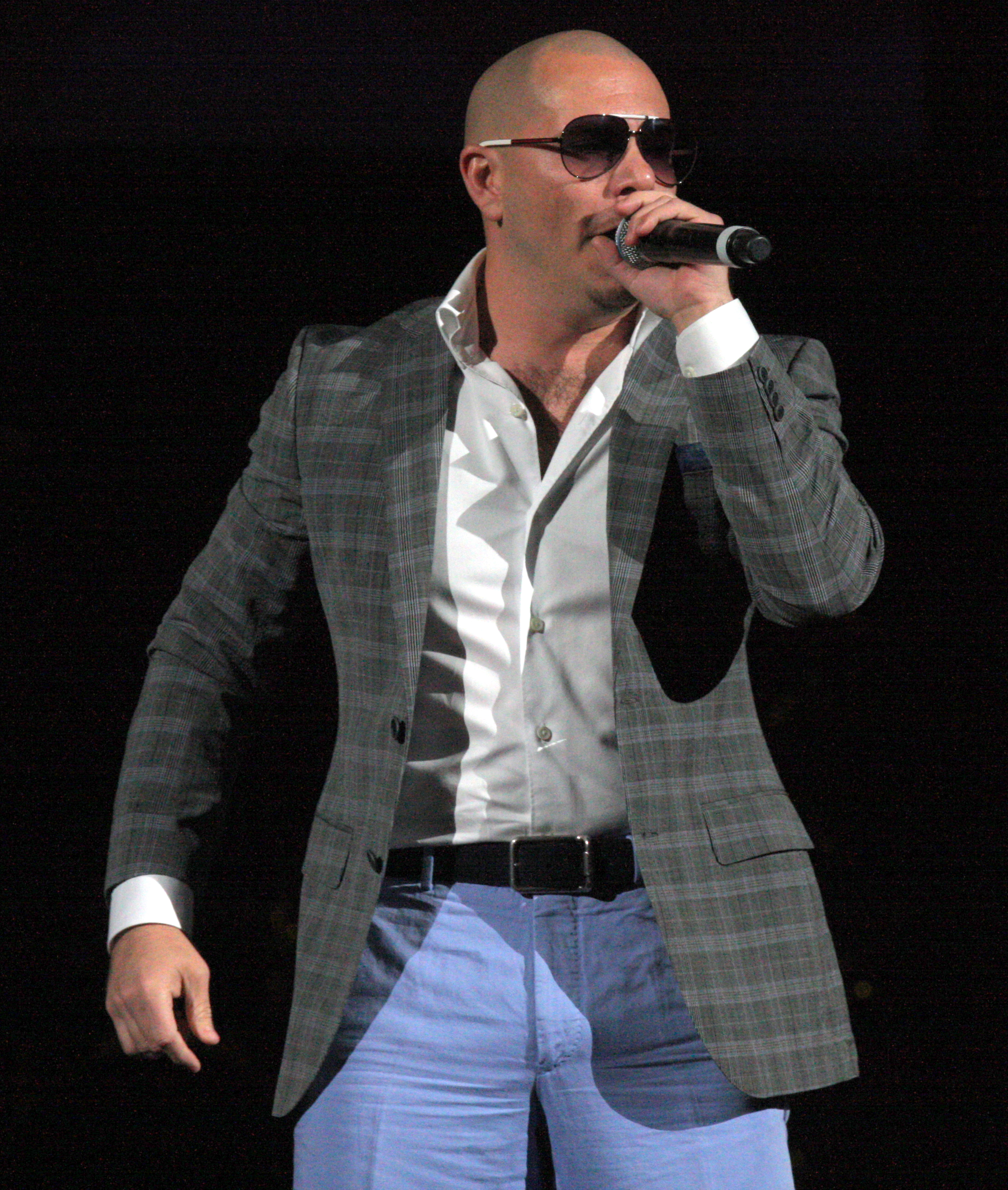
Pitbull scored his second number-one hit in the Dutch Top 40 this year with his song "Give Me Everything" (which features Ne-Yo, Afrojack and Nayer).

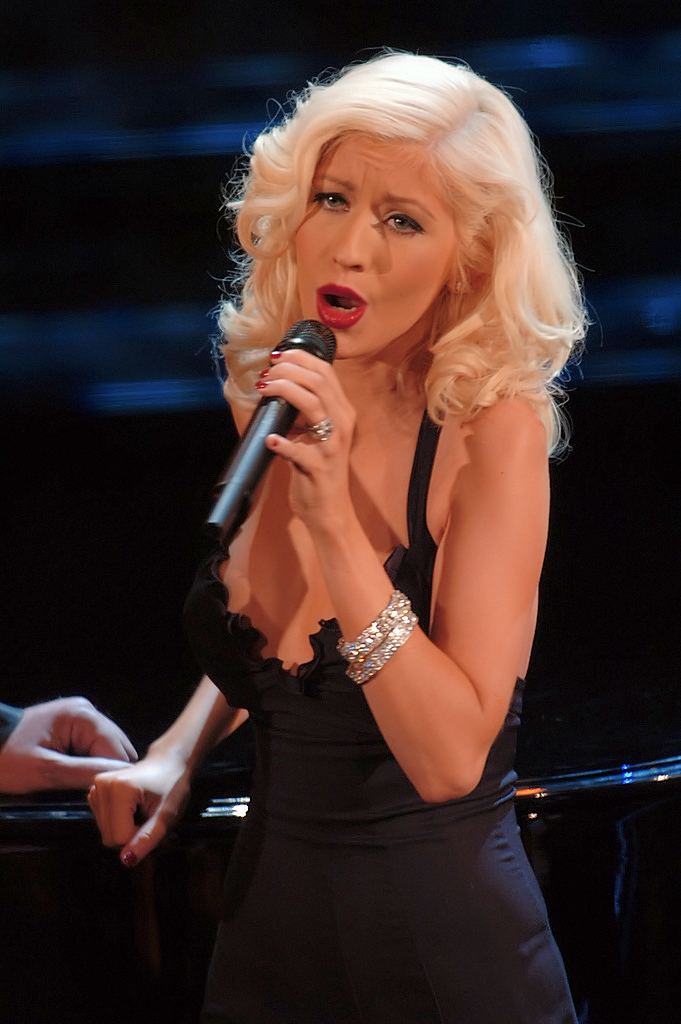
Maroon 5 and Christina Aguilera (pictured) scored their first number-one hit this year with the song "Moves Like Jagger".

This is a list of the Dutch Top 40 number-one singles of 2011. The Dutch Top 40 is a chart that ranks the best-performing singles of the Netherlands. It is published every week by radio station Radio 538. In 2011, it was the first time that the Dutch Top 40 had 53 releases, because there were 53 Saturdays in 2011. In the past, if there were 53 Saturdays in a year, the Dutch Top 40 was only released 52 times.

Eighteen acts gained their first number-one single in the Dutch Top 40 in 2011, either as lead or featured act: Martin Solveig, Dragonette, Adele, Alexis Jordan, Ne-Yo, Afrojack, Nayer, Sak Noel, Don Omar, Lucenzo, Maroon 5, Christina Aguilera, The Voice of Holland, Gotye, Kimbra, Gers Pardoel, Sandro Silva and Quintino. This means only Lady Gaga and Pitbull did not gain their first number-one single this year: they gained their first number-one singles in 2009 (Gaga with "Just Dance" and Pitbull with "I Know You Want Me (Calle Ocho)").

Lady Gaga's single "Born This Way" debuted at number one in the Top 40 this year. This has not happened since 2009, when Lisa Lois's cover version of "Hallelujah" debuted at number one. Alexis Jordan became the artist with the most weeks on number one this year: her song "Happiness" spent ten weeks at the top (see number-one artists). Three singles spent only one week at the number-one position: "Set Fire to the Rain", "One Thousand Voices" and "Epic".

The artist with the most number-one singles in 2011, was Adele. In fact, she was the only artist with more than one number-one single this year. She reached the top with her songs "Rolling in the Deep" and "Set Fire to the Rain". Adele also became, with these two singles, the first act since 1974 that held the number-one position with more than one song consecutively. In 1974, the English band Mud managed to achieve this with the singles "Dynamite" and "Tiger Feet".

Seven artists that scored a Dutch Top 40 number-one single in 2011, are American; five are Dutch. The other artists are Belgian Australian, Canadian, French, New Zealander, Portuguese, Puerto Rican, Spanish and British. The most used language in the number-one singles of 2011 is English.

== Chart history ==
Issue Date	Song	Artist(s)	Reference(s)
January 1	"Hello"	Martin Solveig & Dragonette	
January 8	"Hello"	Martin Solveig & Dragonette	
January 15	"Hello"	Martin Solveig & Dragonette	
January 22	"Hello"	Martin Solveig & Dragonette	
January 29	"Rolling in the Deep"	Adele	
February 5	"Rolling in the Deep"	Adele	
February 12	"Rolling in the Deep"	Adele	
February 19	"Rolling in the Deep"	Adele	
February 26	"Born This Way"	Lady Gaga	
March 5	"Born This Way"	Lady Gaga	
March 12	"Rolling in the Deep"	Adele	
March 19	"Rolling in the Deep"	Adele	
March 26	"Rolling in the Deep"	Adele	
April 2	"Set Fire to the Rain"	Adele	
April 9	"Happiness"	Alexis Jordan	
April 16	"Happiness"	Alexis Jordan	
April 23	"Happiness"	Alexis Jordan	
April 30	"Happiness"	Alexis Jordan	
May 7	"Happiness"	Alexis Jordan	
May 14	"Happiness"	Alexis Jordan	
May 21	"Happiness"	Alexis Jordan	
May 28	"Happiness"	Alexis Jordan	
June 4	"Happiness"	Alexis Jordan	
June 11	"Happiness"	Alexis Jordan	
June 18	"Give Me Everything"	Pitbull featuring Ne-Yo, Afrojack & Nayer	
June 25	"Give Me Everything"	Pitbull featuring Ne-Yo, Afrojack & Nayer	
July 2	"Loca People"	Sak Noel	
July 9	"Loca People"	Sak Noel	
July 16	"Loca People"	Sak Noel	
July 23	"Loca People"	Sak Noel	
July 30	"Danza Kuduro"	Don Omar & Lucenzo	
August 6	"Danza Kuduro"	Don Omar & Lucenzo	
August 13	"Danza Kuduro"	Don Omar & Lucenzo	
August 20	"Danza Kuduro"	Don Omar & Lucenzo	
August 27	"Danza Kuduro"	Don Omar & Lucenzo	
September 3	"Danza Kuduro"	Don Omar & Lucenzo	
September 10	"Danza Kuduro"	Don Omar & Lucenzo	
September 17	"Moves Like Jagger"	Maroon 5 featuring Christina Aguilera	
September 24	"Moves Like Jagger"	Maroon 5 featuring Christina Aguilera	
October 1	"Moves Like Jagger"	Maroon 5 featuring Christina Aguilera	
October 8	"One Thousand Voices"	The Voice of Holland^{[1]}	
October 15	"Somebody That I Used to Know"	Gotye featuring Kimbra	
October 22	"Somebody That I Used to Know"	Gotye featuring Kimbra	
October 29	"Somebody That I Used to Know"	Gotye featuring Kimbra	
November 5	"Ik Neem Je Mee"	Gers Pardoel	
November 12	"Ik Neem Je Mee"	Gers Pardoel	
November 19	"Ik Neem Je Mee"	Gers Pardoel	
November 26	"Ik Neem Je Mee"	Gers Pardoel	
December 3	"Somebody That I Used to Know"	Gotye featuring Kimbra	
December 10	"Somebody That I Used to Know"	Gotye featuring Kimbra	
December 17	"Ik Neem Je Mee"	Gers Pardoel	
December 24	"Ik Neem Je Mee"	Gers Pardoel	
December 31	"Epic"	Sandro Silva & Quintino	

Notes

- 1 "One Thousand Voices" is a song by the coaches of the Dutch programme The Voice of Holland: Marco Borsato, Angela Groothuizen, Nick & Simon (Nick Schilder & Simon Keizer) and VanVelzen.

== Number-one artists ==
Position	Artist	Weeks #1
1	Alexis Jordan	10
2	Adele	8
3	Lucenzo	7
3	Don Omar	7
4	Gers Pardoel	6
5	Gotye	5
5	Kimbra	5
6	Martin Solveig	4
6	Dragonette	4
6	Sak Noel	4
7	Maroon 5	3
7	Christina Aguilera	3
8	Lady Gaga	2
8	Pitbull	2
8	Ne-Yo	2
8	Afrojack	2
8	Nayer	2
9	The Voice of Holland	1
9	Sandro Silva	1
9	Quintino	1

== See also ==
- 2011 in music
