= Snotkop =

South African singer and songwriter

snotkop
- Also known as: bgay (until 2005)
- Born: Francois Henning; 22 December 1974 (age 51)
- Origin: South Africa
- Genres: Pop, rap, kwaito
- Years active: 1989–present
- Website: www.snotkop.co.za

Francois Henning (born 22 December 1974), better known by his stage name Snotkop ([ˈsnɔtkɔp], and previously known as Lekgoa [ləkˈχo̯a], is a South African singer and rapper who performs in Afrikaans.

He started his music career at age 15 preparing demo CDs, and in the late 1990s adopted the stage name Lekgoa ("white guy" in Sotho language Sotho) singing in the South African kwaito genre of music. In this period, he was signed to Gallo record label, releasing two albums; Basetsana in 1999 and Ngamla Yoba in 2002.

In 2005, he adopted the name Snotkop initially as part of a 4-piece boy band, and shortly later a solo act signing with Next Music-record label, and launched his self-titled 2005 debut album Snotkop followed by So Damn Sexy in 2008 and Francois Henning was hier in 2009. With the release of Ek laaik van jol in 2012, he became one of the top selling South African artists in Africa in the Afrikaans language. Well known singles and music video releases include "Song vir my dad", "Dis 'n land", "Hou my stywer vas", "Oppas", "Katrien", "Parapapa" (a remake of Cidinho & Doca hit "Rap das Armas"), "Hoe lykit", "Raak vir my rustig", "Cool soos Koos Kombuis", and "Agter op my fiets". He is also featured in Shine4's "Ramaja", a cover of Glenys Lynne's hit with the same title, in Kurt Darren's hit "Stoomtrein" and in MoniQue's hit "Ek val vir jou", an Afrikaans cover of Waldo's People's "Lose Control", one of several international hits he has covered in the language. Other covers include The Offspring's "Why Don't You Get A Job?", covered as "Kry jouself by die werk" and Junior e Leonardo's "Rap das Armas", covered as "Parapapa", but with unrelated lyrics.

Snotkop is also a television personality. He presented the programme Petrolkop on MK, the mostly Afrikaans music channel in South Africa where Snotkop featured various celebrities driving racing cars in time trials against each other.

== Awards ==
Snotkop was nominated for 9 MK, Tempo and Vonk awards, notably "Best Afrikaans Pop album". In 2009, he was nominated for South African Music Awards in the category "Best Afrikaans DVD" during the 15th annual awards.

In 2012, Snotkop won "Best Sokkie Dans Album" award for his album Ek Laaik Van Jol during the 18th South African Music Awards.

== Discography ==
=== Studio albums ===
as Lekgoa

- 1999: Basetsana
- 2002: Ngamla Yoba

as Snotkop

- 2005: Snotkop
- 2008: So Damn Sexy
- 2009: Francois Henning was hier
- 2011: Ek laaik van jol!
- 2012: Oppas
- 2014: Soos 'n boss
- 2016: HKGK
- 2018: Sous

=== Others ===
- 2007: Spring lewendig (Live album and DVD)
- 2011: Die beste van Snotkop (Compilation album)
- 2013: Wille videos (DVD)

== Videography ==
- 2009: "Parapapa"
- 2010: "Vrydagaand"
- 2011: "Song vir my dad"
- 2011: "Ek laaik van jol"
- 2012: "Dis 'n land"
- 2012: "Oppas"
- 2013: "Ek's dalk 'n ses"
- 2013: "Shut up en soen my"
- 2013: "Hou my stywer vas"
- 2013: "Katrien"
- 2013: "Bakgat Boogie"
- 2014: "Dikkelicious"
- 2014: "Agter op my fiets"
- 2015: "Kry jouself by die werk"
- 2015: "Ek wens"
- 2015: "Hiekies in Hartenbos"
- 2015: "Loslap"
- 2016: "Cool soos Koos Kombuis"
- 2016: "Rock my Amadeus"
- 2017: "Raak vir my rustig"
- 2017: "Woestersous"
- 2019: "Pens en pootjies"
- 2025 "Avbob se stoep"

Collaborative

- 2010: "Ek val vir jou" (MoniQue & Snotkop)
- 2012: "Stoomtrein" (Kurt Darren feat. Snotkop)
