= Phatt =

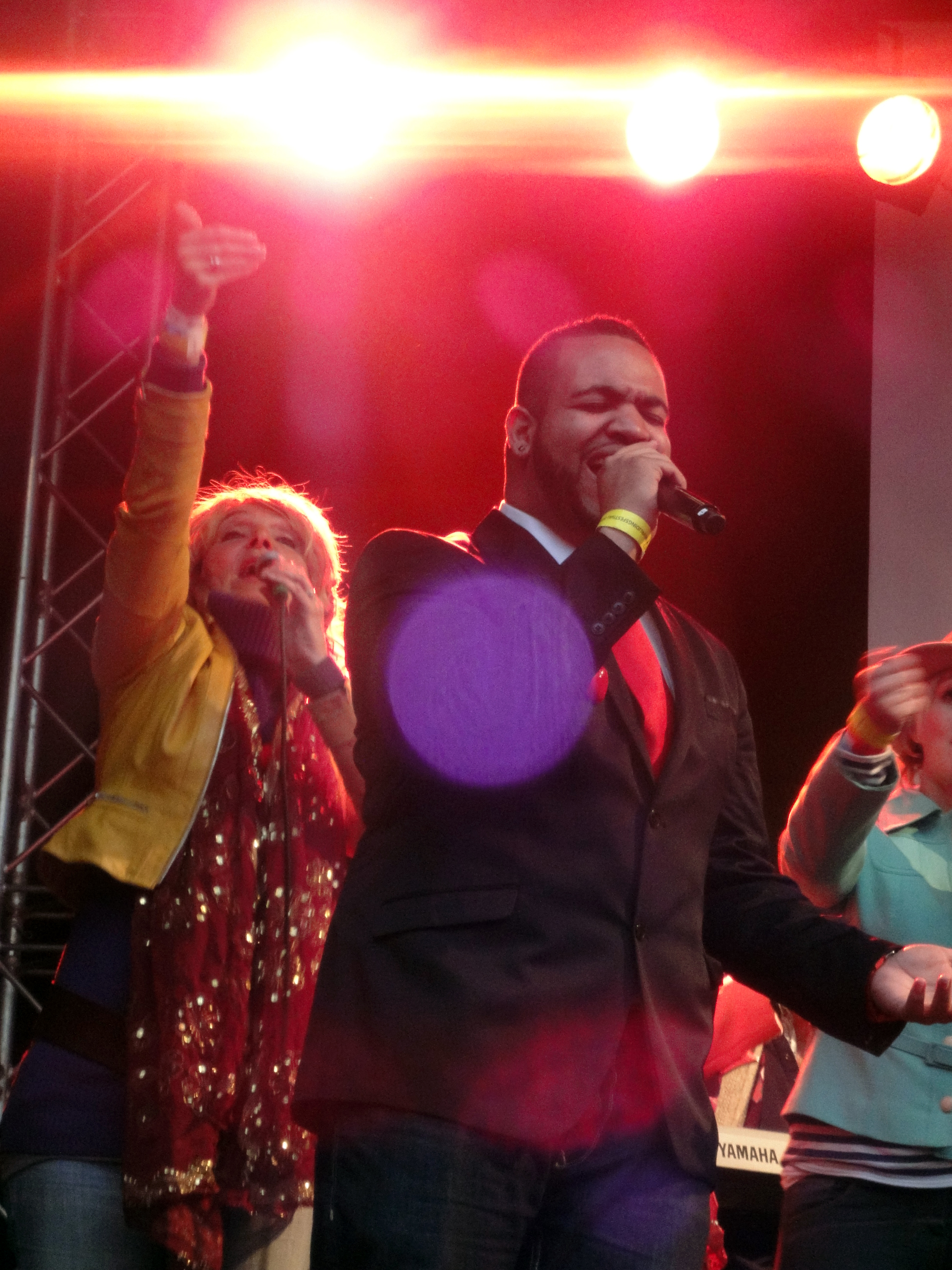

Background information
- Born: Ricardo Burgrust; Rotterdam, Netherlands
- Genres: R&B, pop, hip hop, dance
- Occupations: Singer, songwriter, record producer
- Years active: 2004–present
- Formerly of: RMXCRW

Phatt is a Dutch singer, songwriter and producer. He generally performs under his stage name and writes, composes and produces under his real name, Ricardo Burgrust.

Phatt has performed and worked with international artists such as Chaka Khan, Candy Dulfer and Rick Ross. Until 2010, Phatt was a member of the RMXCRW, pronounced as RemixCrew. With the RMXCRW, Phatt toured the world and had several hit songs.

== Biography ==
Phatt grew up in the Netherlands. He started singing in a choir when he was six years old. He was inspired by his cousin, who was a pop star in Portugal. Phatt's mother is from Portugal, and his father is from Suriname, in South America.

When he was a teenager, Phatt went to a high school that specializes in music and dance, and he studied singing at the conservatory of Rotterdam, the Netherlands. Since 2010 he has also been a teacher at the Amsterdam and Rotterdam Conservatory.

When Phatt was 16 years old, he made his first steps into the music industry. He started as a background vocalist to various chart topping Dutch artists. Phatt has performed with saxophone player Candy Dulfer and American pop icon Chaka Khan. He still shares the stage with Candy Dulfer on her worldwide tour; he is now a "special guest".

From 2005 to 2010 Phatt was a member of the RMXCRW. Their first release was a remix of Kevin Lyttle's "Turn Me On". The three members of the formation each brought their own musical style: rap, dancehall and soul / R&B. As the singer of the RMXCRW, Phatt has shared the stage with Dru Hill, 112 and Jodeci. The group had hits in the Dutch charts and toured around the world, with performances across Europe, Asia and the Caribbean. In 2010 the group split up with a farewell concert, also in the Caribbean.

Phatt is currently working on various projects as a solo artist. He still lives in the Netherlands. Phatt recorded the dance track "Looking for Love", which reached number 3 in the Portuguese iTunes download charts and was in the Portugal Singles Top 50.

Phatt recently recorded the song "Dancing" for the soundtrack of the dance film Body Language. This track is released in Portugal on 14 January 2012. Phatt will release his EP #Lovely EP in the spring of 2012. Phatt was the opening act for R&B artists Ciara, Joe, Akon and Ne-Yo. He also writes and produces songs for Dutch artists and is a leading vocalist in the Dutch hiphop scene.

Phatt is also expanding his career towards the USA. He has worked with Omega, a singer from Atlanta, on an official remix of the song "Make Love to this Music" by American rapper Rick Ross.

== Discography ==
=== Song credits ===
Title	Artist	Credited	Position in charts	Album	Released by
Als je slaapt	Glennis Grace	Ricardo Burgrust – Piano	No. 9 – in the Netherlands		
Girl – B Side Single	Anouk	Ricardo Burgrust – Backing Vocals			
Ping!	Fouradi	Ricardo Burgrust – Songwriter	No. 20 in the Netherlands		
Een Date	Damaru	Ricardo Burgrust – Songwriter		Tuintje in mijn hart	Top Notch
Zo Zit Het Niet	Damaru	Ricardo Burgrust – Songwriter		Tuintje in mijn hart	Top Notch
Deze Wereld is van jou	Gers Pardoel ft. Phatt	Ricardo Burgrust – co-production, songwriter, vocals		Deze Wereld Is Van Jou	Top Notch
20:30	Gers Pardoel ft. Guus Meeuwis	Ricardo Burgrust – co-production		Deze Wereld Is Van Jou	Top Notch
Wat ik zie	Kempi ft. Phatt	Ricardo Burgrust – Songwriting and vocals		Het testament van Zanian Adamus	Top Notch
Ouder	Monsif	Ricardo Burgrust – co production, songwriting and backing vocals		Voor Jou	Zonamo Entertainment
Looking for Love	Delivio Reavon & Aaron Gill ft. Phatt	Ricardo Burgrust – co production, songwriting and vocals	No. 42 in Portugal	Looking for Love	Cloud9
Dancing	Delivio Reavon & Aaron Gill ft. Phatt	Ricardo Burgrust – co production, songwriting and vocals		Looking for Love	Cloud9
