= Jan van Nuenen =

Dutch visual artist

Jan van Nuenen (born 1978) is a Dutch visual artist with a strong focus on media art, including video collages, computer animations and video installations. A recurring theme in his artworks is the relations between humans, technology and nature.

== Education ==
Van Nuenen studied audio-visual design at the art academy St. Joost in Breda where he graduated in 2002. He graduated in 2002 with the 12-minute long animation film Optimizer Customizer, which shows the “eventual downfall of civilized society” caused by consumerism. Optimizer Customizer was nominated for the René Coulhoprijs in the same year but did not win.

== Career ==
Van Nuenen has said to be fascinated by “trivial” imagery, which are images that were not made with an artistic purpose in mind. These images are often what jumpstarts his artworks; there is no scenario or narrative prior. Van Nuenen usually does not work with his own imagery but salvages the images that fascinate him and builds his computer animations with these. These animations are built and shown on Van Nuenen's own hardware and software.

Even though Van Nuenen does not work with a preexisting narrative, the narration often unfolds itself in the same direction, though, which often focuses on society's rigid and mechanic components that keep the gears of this machinal society turning. The perfect way to resist this rigid system is to make art, according to Van Nuenen.

Due to his skilful salvaging of images, he has been named the “master of recycling” by Dutch art journalist Sandra Smallenburg.

=== Works ===
Some of Van Nuenen's works include:

- Optimizer Customizer (2002), a 12-minute long 2D animation video made with pre-existing images and sounds that are composed to show a feminine machine that runs on money. Inside her is a factory that endlessly repeats its tasks. When one task within this system malfunctions, a chain-reaction which rapidly destroys the system follows. This is Van Nuenen's first video animation.
- Seeing Bush Through the Trees (2003), a 2-minute long video in which logos of multinational companies are collaged to create a distorted portrait of George W. Bush.
- Lame Yard (2003), a 2-minute two-channel video installation. Each channel shows a 2D computer animation of symmetric landscapes that become more and more chaotic until an almost abstract world is all that remains.
- SET-4 (2003), a 4-minute long video using footage from various sports competitions, including table tennis, volleyball and springboard diving. The footage and accompanying sounds are digitally manipulated by Van Nuenen to create a noisy composition.
- Warning, Petroleum Pipeline (2004), a 4-minute long animated video in which a desert landscape slowly transforms into a futuristic industrialized world in which neither a landscape nor a machine can be recognized anymore.
- Aux Raus - Rasthof Deutschland (2007), a 3-minute long music video for the Dutch gabber-punk band Aux Raus.
- Battle of the Plants (2007), an 8-minute long video installation shown in Rotterdam, the Netherlands. A system of skeletons and plants slowly take over the building they are projected upon.
- Evolizer (2007), an 11-minute long animated video showing figures moving around in a black and white city, one of these figures carries a box. This box opens up and reveals a colourful world in which organisms seem to struggle for survival. Van Nuenen received support from Ruveanne Gerrissen for the animations. The sound for this video is created by Aux Raus, Sanne Groeneveld, Studio Gnocci and Roderick Hietbrink.
- Physics Distorter (2009), a real-time computer simulation of falling and colliding objects projected on a building. The audience could control the direction of these objects through a wireless globe.
- Deep Sea Paradiso (2010), an 8-minute video installation shown in Amsterdam, the Netherlands. The video shows the rise and fall of the tides. The fall of the tides causes the creatures in the sea to disappear. New creatures are created when the tide rises again.
- nAnOnAnD (2011), a hand-made, cheap and patchable sound synthesizer. The building instructions for this synthesizer are available for free on the artist's website.
- Hit Others (2013), a free video game created by Van Nuenen, musician Bastiaan Bosma and the Dutch band Bullerslug. The game is no longer available online.
- The Origin of Creepers (2017), a real-time computer simulation of a fictional ecosystem projected on a forest on Vlieland. The ecosystem is made up by hordes of creatures who battle each other for food and habitat. These creatures are becoming better at adapting to their surroundings and reproduce quickly. The public can stop creatures from taking over the ecosystem by producing loud noise.

== Exhibitions and awards ==
=== Group exhibitions ===
- 2002, Academie Awards, Showroom Mama, Rotterdam (Netherlands).
- 2002, KunstXpress, Rotterdam (Netherlands).
- 2003, Museo de Arte Contemporáneo, Santiago (Chile).
- 2004, SMS XL, Showroom Mama, Rotterdam (Netherlands).
- 2004, Videozone 2, Centre of Contemporary Art, Tel Aviv (Israel).
- 2004, La Sapienza, Laboratory Museum of Contemporary Art, Rome (Italy).
- 2004, Galerie für Zeitgenössische Kunst, Leipzig (Germany).
- 2005, Close Encounters, Artoteek Den Haag, Den Haag (Netherlands).
- 2005, assume vivid astro focus, Tate Liverpool, Liverpool (United Kingdom).
- 2006, National Museum of Contemporary Art, Bucharest (Romania).
- 2006, Next Level. Art, Games & Reality, Stedelijk Museum, Amsterdam (Netherlands).
- 2006, This is America: Viisies op de Amerikaanse Droom, Centraal Museum, Utrecht (Netherlands).
- 2006, Maverick Convention, Gallery Majke Hüsstege, Den Bosch (Netherlands).
- 2006, His Life is Full of Miracles, Site Gallery, Sheffield (United Kingdom).
- 2006, Met Stip, Gem Den Haag, Den Haag (Netherlands).
- 2007, Municipal Gallery Arsenal, Poznań (Poland).
- 2007, MiArt, Milan (Italy).
- 2007, TENT, Rotterdam (Netherlands).
- 2008, Ecoscape, TENT, Rotterdam (Netherlands).
- 2008, Filtered Gallery, Club11, Amsterdam (Netherlands).
- 2008, ReSort Off, Design Museum Den Bosch, Den Bosch (Netherlands).
- 2008, Gallery Henze & Ketterer, Bern (Germany).
- 2009, Transmediale Art Festival at C-Base, PLANETART, Berlin (Germany).
- 2009, Transformations, MK Gallery, Berlin (Germany).
- 2009, Transformations, MK Gallery, Rotterdam (Netherlands).
- 2009, Ned 2, Museum Gouda, Gouda, (Netherlands).
- 2009, Gaga Arts Centre, New York (United States).
- 2009, Kunstenlab, Deventer (Netherlands).
- 2010, Hara Museum of Contemporary Art, Tokyo (Japan).
- 2010, The Mediagate, Galeria NT, Lodz (Poland).
- 2010, OneDotZero, London (United Kingdom).
- 2011, Attraction of the Opposites, Cucosa, Rotterdam (Netherlands).
- 2012, The Kids are All right, Kunsthal, Rotterdam (Netherlands).
- 2012, Game City, CBK, Den Bosch (Netherlands).
- 2013, Route du Nord, Rotterdam (Netherlands).
- 2013, Game-City, TETEM Kunstruimte, Enschede (Netherlands).

=== Solo exhibitions ===
- 2007, W139, Amsterdam (Netherlands).
- 2008, Alexandria Contemporary Art Forum, Alexandria (Egypt).

=== Awards ===
- 2002, Teek, Breda (Netherlands), award ‘public price’ for Optimizer Customizer.
- 2003, Shorts!, Amsterdam (Netherlands), award ‘digital’ for Optimizer Customizer.
