= Morgen ben ik rijk =

Single by Gers Pardoel

from the album Deze wereld is van jou
- Released: 12 April 2011
- Genre: Hip hop
- Length: 3:12
- Label: TopNotch, Universal
- Songwriter(s): Gerwin Pardoel, Jelle de Boer
- Producer(s): Snelle Jelle

Gers Pardoel singles chronology
"Ik ga hard" (2011)	"Morgen ben ik rijk" (2011)	"Ik neem je mee" (2011)

Music video
- "Morgen ben ik rijk" on YouTube

"Morgen ben ik rijk" (Dutch pronunciation: [ˈmɔrɣə(m) bɛn ɪk ˈrɛik]; English: "Tomorrow I'll Be Rich") is a song recorded by Dutch rapper Gers Pardoel for his debut studio album, Deze wereld is van jou. It was released on 12 April 2011. The song was co-written by Pardoel and disc jockey Snelle Jelle (Jelle de Boer) and was produced by Snelle Jelle.

== Track listing ==
- Digital download
1. "Morgen ben ik rijk" – 3:12
2. "Morgen ben ik rijk" (Instrumental Version) - 3:10

== Personnel ==
- Songwriting – Gerwin Pardoel, Jelle de Boer
- Production – Snelle Jelle

== Charts and certifications ==
=== Weekly charts ===
Chart (2011)	Peak position
Netherlands (Single Top 100)	61

== Release history ==
Region	Date	Format
Netherlands	11 April 2011	CD single
Netherlands	12 April 2011	Digital download
Belgium	12 April 2011	Digital download
