= Broodje Bakpao =

2009 single by Gers Pardoel

Single by The Opposites featuring Gers and Sef

from the album Succes / Ik Ben Twan
- Released: 4 December 2009
- Genre: Hip hop
- Length: 3:15:00
- Label: TopNotch, Universal
- Songwriter(s): Twan van Steenhoven, Yousef Gnaoui, Gerwin Pardoel, Steffen Haars
- Producer(s): Big2

The Opposites singles chronology
"Vandaag / Me Nikes" (2008)	"Broodje Bakpao" (2009)	"Licht Uit" (2010)

Gers singles chronology
"Broodje Bakpao" (2009)	"Ik Ga Hard" (2011)

Sef singles chronology
"Aye" (2009)	"Broodje Bakpao" (2009)	"Crazy Zin In" (2010)

Music video
- "Broodje Bakpao" on YouTube

"Broodje Bakpao" is a song recorded by Dutch rapper Big2, from the hip hop duo The Opposites, featuring rappers Gers and Sef. The song is based on the popular Dutch sketch show New Kids. The single was released on 4 December 2009 through TopNotch. It was produced by Big2, and co-written by Twan van Steenhoven, Yousef Gnaoui, Gerwin Pardoel and Steffen Haars. The single became a success in the Netherlands and Belgium.

== Background ==
The single is based on the Dutch comedy sketch show New Kids, a popular television series in the Netherlands, with the programme's popularity being the main reason behind the success of "Broodje Bakpao". The song lyrics refer to the consumption of Bakpau, a Chinese Indonesian dish often popular in the Netherlands, where it is known as a "broodje Bapao".

== Chart performance ==
"Broodje Bakpao" became a success in the Netherlands and Flanders. In the Netherlands, the song reached number 1 in the Mega Single Top 100, where it stayed at the top for two weeks. It reached number 2 in the Dutch Top 40 and remained there for three weeks. In Flanders, the song reached the third position in the Ultratop 50.

== Music video ==
In the music video, the characters of New Kids are eating Bakpau. As of December 2015, the video on YouTube was watched over 3.4 million times. The cover art of the single is a screenshot of the music video.

== Track listing ==
- CD single
1. "Broodje Bakpao" – 3:15

== Personnel ==
- Songwriting – Twan van Steenhoven, Yousef Gnaoui, Gerwin Pardoel, Steffen Haars
- Production – Big2

== Charts and certifications ==
=== Weekly charts ===
Chart (2010)	Peak position
Belgium (Ultratop 50 Flanders)	3
Netherlands (Dutch Top 40)	2
Netherlands (Single Top 100)	1

=== Year-end charts ===
Chart (2010)	Position
Netherlands (Dutch Top 40)	57
Netherlands (Mega Single Top 100)	58

== Release history ==
Region	Date	Format
Netherlands	14 December 2009	Promo CD single
Netherlands	8 January 2010	CD single
