= Ik neem je mee =

Single by Gers Pardoel

from the album Deze wereld is van jou
- Released: 2 September 2011
- Genre: Hip hop; pop; pop rap
- Length: 3:37
- Label: TopNotch, Universal
- Songwriters: Gerwin Pardoel, Ricardo de Rooy, Sergio van Gonter
- Producer: Reverse

Gers Pardoel singles chronology
"Morgen ben ik rijk" (2011)	"Ik neem je mee" (2011)	"Nergens zonder jou" (2011)

Music video
- "Ik neem je mee" on YouTube

"Ik neem je mee" (Dutch pronunciation: [ɪk ˈneːm jə ˈmeː]; English: "I'll Take You With Me") is a song recorded by Dutch rapper Gers Pardoel for his debut studio album, Deze wereld is van jou (English: "This World Is Yours"). It was released on 2 September 2011 as the second single of the album. The song was produced by Dutch producer Sergio van Gonter, better known as Reverse, and co-written by Van Gonter, Pardoel and Ricardo de Rooy. The single became a great success in the Netherlands and Belgium. "Ik neem je mee" is the most successful Dutch-language song in the Dutch Top 40 and the Mega Top 50 ever.

== Chart performance ==
"Ik neem je mee" became a great success in The Netherlands and Flanders. In The Netherlands, the song reached the peak position in both the Dutch Top 40 and the Mega Single Top 100. It spent five weeks at the top of the Mega Single Top 100 and six weeks at the peak position of the Dutch Top 40. On 3 November 2011, "Ik neem je mee" was certified gold by the NVPI. Gers Pardoel received the award from Matthijs van Nieuwkerk during an episode of De Wereld Draait Door. Pardoel's first reaction was: "Now already?!" A few weeks later, on 26 November, the song was certified platinum in The Netherlands. This time, Pardoel received the award from Paul de Leeuw during an episode of PAU!L, after his performance with Guus Meeuwis. In Flanders, the song reached the second position in the Ultratop 50 and the first position in the Radio 2 Top 30. The song was also certified gold and later even platinum by the Belgian Entertainment Association.

== Music video ==
The music video for "Ik neem je mee" is a 3D-animation. It was launched on 31 August 2011 on Vimeo. The main character in the music video takes his girlfriend on a trip around the world. During the trip they get married, have children and grow old together. They travel around the world, including Rome and Paris. This represents the lyrics of the chorus: "Ik neem je mee / neem je mee op reis / Neem je mee / naar Rome of Parijs" means "I'll take you with me / take you on a trip / Take you with me / to Rome or Paris". As of 23 May 2013, the video on YouTube was watched over 14 million times. The cover art of the single is a picture of the 3D-animations of Pardoel and his girlfriend in the music video.

== Cover versions ==
- The Dutch cover band Volgende X Beter (English: Next T(ime) Better) added "Ik neem je mee" to their repertoire on 15 November 2011. By doing this, the party band "responded to the Dutch charts", as said on their web site.
- Het Feestteam (English: The Party Team), a Dutch duo consisting of Stan van de Dobbelsteen and Peter Loree, released a carnival version of "Ik neem je mee" in late November 2011. This cover was produced by Berk Music Productions and reached the 25th position of the Mega Single Top 100.
- Dutch singer Sanne Hans sang a cover version of "Ik neem je mee" at Giel Beelen's show GIEL on 1 December 2011.
- On 12 January 2012, Dutch singer Gerst released a parody of "Ik neem je mee", called "Ik laat je thuis" (English: "I'll Leave You At Home"). Just as Het Feestteam, Gers made the parody especially for Carnival 2012. The video on YouTube was watched almost 600 times in just one day. This parody became a success and reached the 34th position of the Mega Single Top 100.
- Dutch singer Leonie Meijer, finalist of the first season of The Voice of Holland, released a cover version of "Ik neem je mee" on 13 January, which is included on her single "Het staat in de sterren" (English: "It's Written In The Stars").

== Track listing ==
- Digital download
1. "Ik neem je mee" – 3:37
2. "Ik neem je mee" (Instrumental Version) - 3:37

== Personnel ==
- Songwriting – Gers Pardoel, Ricardo de Rooy, Reverse
- Production – Reverse

== Charts and certifications ==
=== Weekly charts ===
Chart (2011–12)	Peak position
Belgium (Ultratop 50 Flanders)	2
Netherlands (Dutch Top 40)	1
Netherlands (Single Top 100)	1

=== Year-end charts ===
Chart (2011)	Position
Netherlands (Dutch Top 40)	29
Netherlands (Mega Single Top 100)	5

Chart (2012)	Position
Belgium (Ultratop 50 Flanders)	8
Netherlands (Dutch Top 40)	19
Netherlands (Mega Single Top 100)	14

=== Certifications ===
Region	Certification	Certified units/sales
Belgium (BRMA)	Platinum	30,000^{*}
Netherlands (NVPI)	Platinum	20,000^{^}
^{*} Sales figures based on certification alone.^{^} Shipments figures based on certification alone.

== Release history ==
Region	Date	Format
Netherlands	2 September 2011	Digital download
Belgium	2 September 2011	Digital download

== See also ==
- List of Dutch Top 40 number-one singles of 2011
