= Deze wereld is van jou =

Studio album by Gers Pardoel
- Released: 14 October 2011
- Recorded: 2009–2011
- Genre: Nederpop, hip hop
- Length: 53:26
- Label: TopNotch, Universal

Singles from Deze wereld is van jou
- 1. "Morgen ben ik rijk" Released: 12 April 2011; 2. "Ik neem je mee" Released: 2 September 2011; 3. "Bagagedrager" Released: 20 January 2012

Professional ratings
Review scores
Source	Rating
NU.nl	3/5 stars

Deze wereld is van jou (Dutch pronunciation: [ˌdeːzə ˈʋeːrəlt ɪs fɑ ˈɲʌu]; "This World Is Yours") is the debut studio album by Dutch artist Gers Pardoel. It was released on 14 October 2011 through TopNotch.

== Track listing ==
No.	Title	Writer(s)	Producer(s)	Length
1.	"Deze wereld is van jou" (featuring Phatt)	Gerwin Pardoel, Ricardo Burgrust	Gerwin Pardoel	4:02
2.	"Morgen ben ik rijk"	Gerwin Pardoel, Jelle de Boer	Snelle Jelle	3:09
3.	"Denk"	Gerwin Pardoel, Fabian Lieuw-a-soe	Gerwin Pardoel, Delivio Reavon	3:03
4.	"Vandaag" (featuring Hef)	Gerwin Pardoel, Julliard Frans	Gerwin Pardoel	3:26
5.	"Ik neem je mee"	Gerwin Pardoel, Ricardo de Rooy, Sergio van Gonter	Reverse	3:37
6.	"De money & de faam"	Gerwin Pardoel	Gerwin Pardoel	3:17
7.	"Zijn"	Gerwin Pardoel	Gerwin Pardoel	3:36
8.	"20.03" (featuring Guus Meeuwis)	Gerwin Pardoel, Ricardo Burgrust, Guus Meeuwis	Gerwin Pardoel	3:07
9.	"Spookstad"	Gerwin Pardoel, Sergio van Gonter	Reverse	3:38
10.	"Eenzaam op de bank"	Gerwin Pardoel, Benny Vreden, Henri Dijan, Jacques Luent, Daniël Faure	FS Green	4:20
11.	"Bagagedrager" (featuring Sef)	Gerwin Pardoel, Yousef Gnaoui	Gerwin Pardoel	3:41
12.	"Zweef"	Gerwin Pardoel, Ronell Plasschaert	Gerwin Pardoel	3:27
13.	"We missen je" (featuring Case Mayfield)	Gerwin Pardoel	Gerwin Pardoel	4:21
14.	"Emotioneel hart"	Gerwin Pardoel, Kim Arzbach, Vijay Kanhai, Arjan Bedawi	Soulsearchin'	3:30
Total length:				50:14

Bonus tracks
No.	Title	Writer(s)	Producer(s)	Length
15.	"Op zoek naar de symfonie"	Gerwin Pardoel, Joris Titawano	SirOJ	3:12
Total length:				53:26

== Charts and certifications ==
=== Weekly charts ===
Chart (2011–12)	Peak position
Belgian Albums Chart (Flanders)	7
Dutch Albums Chart	3

=== Year-end charts ===
Chart (2011)	Position
Dutch Albums Chart	62

=== Certifications ===
Region	Certification	Certified units/sales
Netherlands (NVPI)	Gold	25,000^{^}
^{^} Shipments figures based on certification alone.
