= Epic (Sandro Silva and Quintino song) =

Song by Sandro Silva and Quintino

Single by Sandro Silva and Quintino
- Released: 3 October 2011
- Genre: Big room house
- Length: 5:50 (original); 2:52 (radio edit); 2:42 (Garmiani remix)
- Label: Musical Freedom; Spinnin'
- Songwriters: Shandro Jahangier; Maarten Vorwerk; Quinten van de Berg
- Producers: Sandro Silva; Quintino; Maarten Vorwerk

Quintino singles chronology
"Selecta" (2011)	"Epic" (2011)

Spinnin' Records cover

"Epic" is a song by Dutch producers Sandro Silva and Quintino and produced by Silva, Quintino, and Maarten Vorwerk, released on 3 October 2011. It is considered the first true big room house song. The single became a success in The Netherlands by reaching the peak position in both the Dutch Top 40 and the Mega Single Top 100 (see charts and certifications). "Epic" is the twelfth full instrumental number-one hit in the Dutch Top 40. The track was also featured on Swedish House Mafia's compilation album Until Now.

It is considered one of the most popular big room house songs of all-time, along with "Animals" by Martin Garrix, "Spaceman" by Hardwell, "Tsunami" by Dvbbs and Borgeous and "Tremor" by Dimitri Vegas & Like Mike.

will.i.am caused controversy with his track "Bang Bang" as the drop is extremely similar to the drop from this track, but no permission was used. will.i.am was involved in another sampling scandal on the same album. Eventually, all three of the songwriters of "Epic" were added to the credits of "Bang Bang".

== Charts ==
=== Weekly charts ===
Weekly chart performance for "Epic"
Chart (2011–2012)	Peak position
Belgium (Ultratop 50 Flanders)	16
Belgium (Ultratop 50 Wallonia)	34
Netherlands (Dutch Top 40)	1
Netherlands (Single Top 100)	1
Switzerland (Schweizer Hitparade)	14

=== Year-end charts ===
Year-end chart performance for "Epic"
Chart (2011)	Position
Netherlands (Single Top 100)	99
Chart (2012)	Position
Netherlands (Dutch Top 40)	8
Netherlands (Single Top 100)	11

== Certifications ==
Certifications for "Epic"
Region	Certification	Certified units/sales
Netherlands (NVPI)	Platinum	20,000^{^}
Sweden (GLF)	Gold	20,000^{‡}
^{^} Shipments figures based on certification alone.^{‡} Sales+streaming figures based on certification alone.

== See also ==
- List of Dutch Top 40 number-one singles of 2011
