= Bagagedrager =

Single by Gers Pardoel featuring Sef

from the album Deze wereld is van jou
- Released: 20 January 2012
- Genre: Hip hop
- Length: 3:41:00
- Label: TopNotch, Universal
- Songwriter(s): Yousef Gnaoui, Gerwin Pardoel
- Producer(s): Gers Pardoel

Gers Pardoel singles chronology
"Nergens zonder jou" (2011)	"Bagagedrager" (2012)	"Pijn" (2012)

Sef singles chronology
"Diamanten" (2011)	"Bagagedrager" (2012)

Music video
- "Bagagedrager" on YouTube

"Bagagedrager" (English: "Luggage Carrier" or "Rack") is a song recorded by Dutch rappers Gers Pardoel and Sef (Yousef Gnaoui) for Pardoel's debut studio album, Deze wereld is van jou. It was released on 20 January 2012 through TopNotch, as the third single of the album. The song was co-written by Pardoel and Gnaoui and was produced by Pardoel.

== Track listing ==
- Digital download
1. "Bagagedrager" – 3:41
2. "Bagagedrager" (Instrumental Version) - 3:44

== Personnel ==
- Songwriting – Gerwin Pardoel, Yousef Gnaoui
- Production – Gers Pardoel

== Charts and certifications ==
=== Weekly charts ===
Chart (2011–12)	Peak position
Belgium (Ultratop 50 Flanders)	3
Netherlands (Dutch Top 40)	2
Netherlands (Single Top 100)	2

=== Year-end charts ===
Chart (2012)	Position
Belgium (Ultratop 50 Flanders)	20
Netherlands (Dutch Top 40)	9
Netherlands (Single Top 100)	12

=== Certifications ===
Region	Certification	Certified units/sales
Belgium (BEA)	Gold	15,000^{*}
^{*} Sales figures based on certification alone.

== Release history ==
Region	Date	Format
Netherlands	20 January 2012	Digital download
