= Quintino (DJ) =

Dutch DJ and record producer

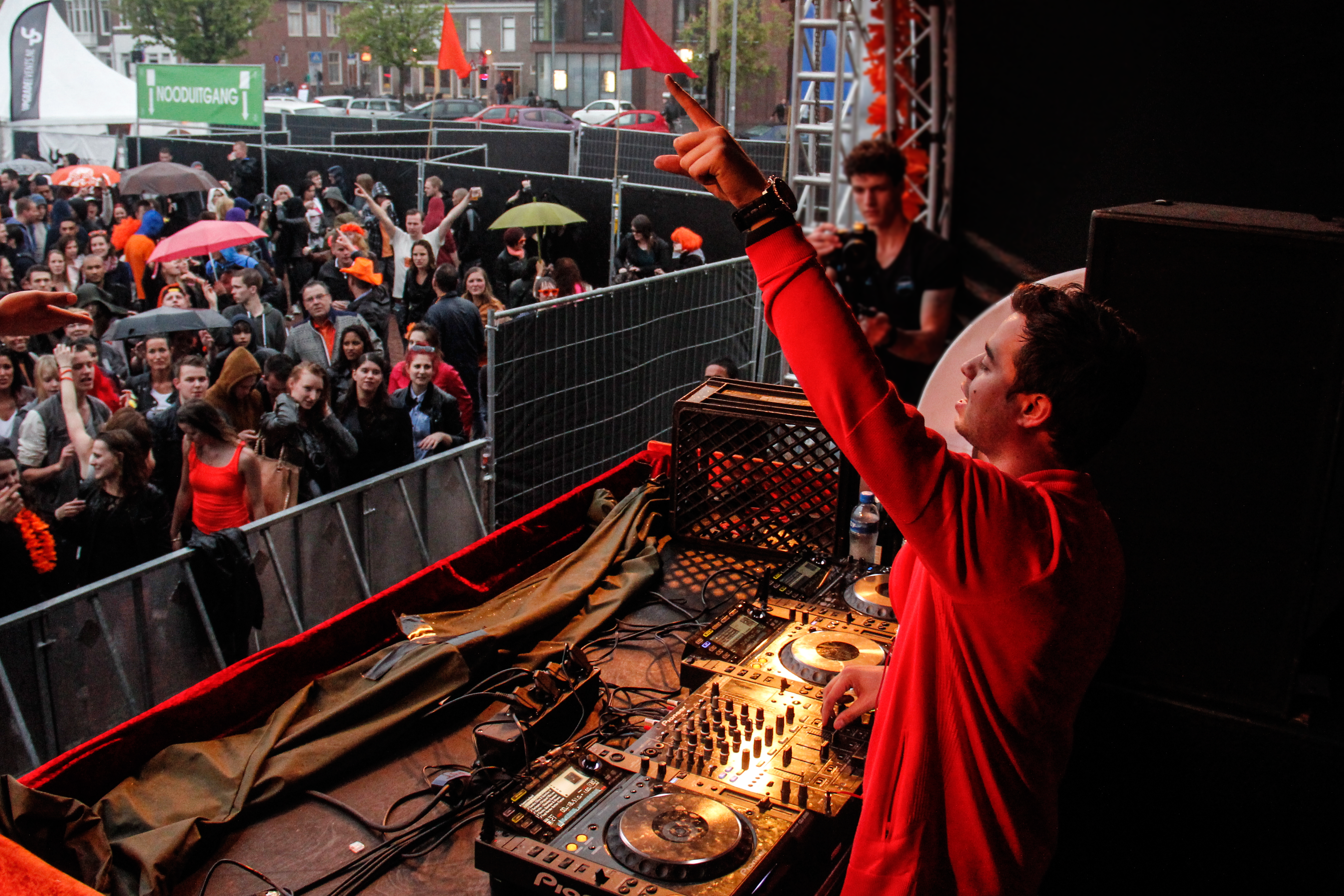

Background information
- Born: Quinten van den Berg; 21 September 1985 (age 40); Den Helder, North Holland, Netherlands
- Genres: Electro house; EDM; Dutch house; progressive house; big room house; trap
- Occupations: Musician; DJ; record producer
- Instruments: Piano; synthesiser
- Years active: 2003–present
- Labels: Spinnin' Records; Revealed Recordings; Musical Freedom; SupersoniQ Records; Mixmash Records; Wall Recordings; STMPD RCRDS
- Website: djquintino.com

Quinten van den Berg (Dutch pronunciation: [ˈkʋɪntə(ɱ) vɑn də(m) ˈbɛr(ə)x]; born 21 September 1985), known professionally as Quintino, is a Dutch DJ and record producer. Notable releases include a remix of "Rap das Armas," "Selecta," "Go Hard," and "Fatality." In 2019 he was named #25 of the Top 100 DJs list put out by DJ Magazine.

== Music career ==
At the age of 18, Quintino was discovered by Dutch DJ Laidback Luke, who assisted in developing his career. His breakthrough followed in 2011 with his remix of stairs hit "Rap Das Armas" in the Netherlands, and the release of Epic. That same year Quintino co-produced the Afrojack track "Selecta." In 2013 he worked with DJs Tiësto and Alvaro to produce the anthem of Ultra Music Festival. In August, he launched his radio show on Radio SupersoniQ international station SiriusXM's Electric Area.

In 2014, Quintino produced tracks like "Go Hard," "Slammer," "Fatality," "Genesis," and a remix of R3hab & Trevor Guthrie's hit "Soundwave." In 2014 Quintino performed on larger stages, growing from a support act to a headliner. He made his debut in the DJ Mag "Top 100 DJs" in 2014, at the 86th position. His ranking has since risen in consecutive years, and was consequently ranked 25th in 2019.

== Awards and nominations ==
Year	Award	Nominated work	Category	Result
2014	DJ Magazine	Quintino	Top 100 DJs	No. 86
2015	DJ Magazine	Quintino	Top 100 DJs	No. 80
2016	DJ Magazine	Quintino	Top 100 DJs	No. 32
2017	DJ Magazine	Quintino	Top 100 DJs	No. 30
2018	DJ Magazine	Quintino	Top 100 DJs	No. 25
2019	DJ Magazine	Quintino	Top 100 DJs	No. 25
2020	DJ Magazine	Quintino	Top 100 DJs	No. 33
2021	DJ Magazine	Quintino	Top 100 DJs	No. 30
2022	DJ Magazine	Quintino	Top 100 DJs	No. 33
2023	DJ Magazine	Quintino	Top 100 DJs	No. 29
2024	DJ Magazine	Quintino	Top 100 DJs	No. 38
2025	DJ Magazine	Quintino	Top 100 Djs	No. 47

== Discography ==
=== Studio albums ===
Title	Album details
Bright Nights	Released: 11 October 2019; Format: Digital download; Label: Spinnin' Records

=== Extended plays ===
Title	Album details
Go Harder	Released: 29 January 2016; Format: Digital download; Label: Spinnin' Premium
Go Harder, Pt. 2	Released: 29 September 2016; Format: Digital download; Label: Spinnin' Premium
Go Harder, Pt. 3: Do or Die	Released: 30 June 2017; Format: Digital download; Label: Spinnin' Records
Go Harder, Pt. 4: EDM's Revenge	Released: 2 March 2018; Format: Digital download; Label: Spinnin' Records

=== Singles ===
Year	Title	Peak chart positions				Album
Year	Title	NLD	BEL (Fl)	BEL (Wa)	SWI	Album
2008	"Supersoniq"	—	—	—	—	Non-album singles
2008	"Wooker"	—	—	—	—	Non-album singles
2008	"Rap das Armas (Quintino Remix)" (with Cidinho & Doca)	13	30	23	—	Non-album singles
2009	"Heaven" (featuring Mitch Crown)	27	—	—	—	Non-album singles
2010	"You Know What"	—^{[A]}	—	—	—	Non-album singles
2010	"You Can't Deny" (featuring Mitch Crown)	27	—	—	—	Non-album singles
2010	"Sustain"	—	—	—	—	Non-album singles
2010	"Can You Feel It" (with Alvaro)	—	—	—	—	Non-album singles
2010	"My House"	—	—	—	—	Non-album singles
2010	"Fire" (with The Partysquad)	20	—	—	—	Non-album singles
2010	"Drop the Beat"	—	—	—	—	Non-album singles
2010	"I Feel"	17	—	—	—	Non-album singles
2011	"Music Oh" (with Apster)	—	—	—	—	Non-album singles
2011	“Selecta” (with Afrojack)	74	—	—	—	Non-album singles
2011	"World Is Calling" (with Groovenatics featuring Jaren)	—	—	—	—	Non-album singles
2011	"Raider"	—	—	—	—	Non-album singles
2011	"Epic" (with Sandro Silva)	1	16	34	14	Non-album singles
2012	"The One and Only"	—	—	—	—	Non-album singles
2012	"We Gonna Rock"	90	—	—	—	Non-album singles
2012	"Circuits" (with MOTi)	69	—	—	—	Non-album singles
2012	"Kinky Denise" (with MOTi)	—	—	—	—	Non-album singles
2013	"United" (with Tiësto and Alvaro)	—	—	—	-	Non-album singles
2013	"Jackpot" (with Ralvero)	—	—	—	—	Non-album singles
2013	"World in Our Hands" (with Alvaro)	—	—	—	—	Non-album singles
2013	"Puzzle" (with Blasterjaxx)	—	—	—	—	Non-album singles
2013	"Dynamite" (with MOTi featuring Taylr Renee)	—^{[B]}	—	—	—	Non-album singles
2014	"Go Hard"	—	—	—	—	Non-album singles
2014	"Crash" (with MOTi)	—	—	—	—	Non-album singles
2014	"Blowfish" (with Kenneth G)	—	—	—	—	Non-album singles
2014	"Slammer" (with FTampa)	—	—	—	—	Non-album singles
2014	"Genesis" (with Mercer)	—	—	—	—	Non-album singles
2015	"Winner"	—	—	—	—	Non-album singles
2015	"Escape (Into the Sunset)" (featuring Una Sand)	—^{[C]}	—	—^{[D]}	—	Non-album singles
2015	"Aftermath" (with Sandro Silva)	—	—	—	—	Non-album singles
2015	"Devotion"	—	—	—	—	Non-album singles
2015	"Scorpion (Hardwell Edit)"	—	—	—	—	Non-album singles
2015	"Unbroken" (with Yves V)	—	—	—	—	Non-album singles
2016	"Freak" (with R3hab)	91	—	—	—	Non-album singles
2016	"Can't Fight It" (with Cheat Codes)	—	—	—	—	Non-album singles
2016	"Lights Out" (with Joey Dale featuring Channii Monroe)	—	—	—	—	Non-album singles
2016	"Underground"	—	—	—	—	Non-album singles
2016	"Baldadig" (with Hardwell)	—	—	—	—	Non-album singles
2017	"Carnival"	—	—	—	—	Non-album singles
2017	"Lost in You" (with Nervo)	—	—	—	—	Non-album singles
2017	"I Just Can't" (with R3hab)	—	—	—	—	Trouble
2017	"Good Vibes" (with Laurell)	—	—	—	—	Bright Nights
2018	"Woest" (with Hardwell)	—	—	—	—	Hardwell & Friends Volume 3
2018	"Slow Down" (with Dimitri Vegas & Like Mike)	—	—	—	—	Patser soundtrack
2018	"Patser Bounce" (with Dimitri Vegas & Like Mike)	—	—	—	—	Patser soundtrack
2018	"Mayhem" (with Steve Aoki)	—	—	—	—	5OKI
2018	"Brasil Connect"	—	—	—	—	Non-album singles
2018	"Get Down" (with Curbi)	—	—	—	—	Non-album singles
2018	"Knockout" (with Deorro and MAKJ)	—	—	—	—	Non-album singles
2018	"Heey Ya"	—	—	—	—	Non-album singles
2018	"Inferno"	—	—	—	—	Non-album singles
2018	"How It's Done"	—	—	—	—	Non-album singles
2019	"Can't Bring Me Down"	—	—	—	—	Bright Nights
2019	"Teqno (Music Is The Answer)"	—	—	—	—	Bright Nights
2019	"Tututu"	—	—	—	—	Bright Nights
2019	"Party Never Ends" (with Alok)	—	—	—	—	Bright Nights
2019	"Reckless" (with Hardwell)	—	—	—	—	Hardwell Presents Revealed Vol. 10 and Bright Nights
2019	"Boing" (with Dimitri Vegas & Like Mike and Mad M.A.C.)	—	—	—	—	Tomorrowland 2019 EP and Bright Nights
2019	"Make Believe"	—	—	—	—	Bright Nights
2019	"Don't Lose Love" (with Afsheen featuring Cher Lloyd)	—	—	—	—	Bright Nights
2020	"The Drill"	—	—	—	—	Non-album singles
2020	"The Chase" (with Dimitri Vegas & Like Mike)	—	—	—	—	Garden of Madness 2020 EP
2020	"Manimal" (with Richie Loop)	—	—	—	—	Non-album singles
2020	"Get You Home"	—	—	—	—	Non-album singles
2020	"Switch Back"	—	—	—	—	Non-album singles
2020	"Ruins" (with Mike Cervello)	—	—	—	—	Non-album singles
2020	"Out Of This World" (featuring Kifi)	—	—	—	—	Non-album singles
2021	"Back to the Oldskool" (with Dimtri Vegas & Like Mike)	—	—	—	—	Non-album singles
2021	"Bad Bees" (featuring Harrison First)	—	—	—	—	Non-album singles
2021	"Coming Home"	—	—	—	—	Non-album singles
2021	"Quechua" (with Thomas Gold)	—	—	—	—	Non-album singles
2021	"Moon"	—	—	—	—	Non-album singles
2021	"In My Head" (featuring Emie)	—	—	—	—	Non-album singles
2021	"Vivid"	—	—	—	—	Non-album singles
2022	"Melody"	—	—	—	—	Non-album singles
2023	"Motor" (with Steve Aoki)	—	—	—	—	Hiroquest 2: Double Helix
"—" denotes a recording that did not chart or was not released in that territory.

=== Remixes ===
- 2011: LMFAO — "Champagne Showers" (Quintino Remix)
- 2011: Pitbull featuring Marc Anthony — "Rain Over Me" (Quintino Remix)
- 2012: Pitbull — "Back In Time" (from "Men In Black 3") (Quintino Remix)
- 2012: Lady Gaga — "Marry The Night" (Quintino Remix)
- 2013: Example - “All the Wrong Places” (Quintino Remix)
- 2017: J Balvin and Willy William — "Mi Gente" (Hardwell & Quintino Remix)
- 2020: Regard — "Ride It" (Dimitri Vegas & Like Mike and Quintino Remix)
- 2020: Tiësto and Vintage Culture — "Coffee (Give Me Something)" (Quintino Remix)
- 2021: Illenium, Valerie Broussard, and Nurko — "Sideways" (Quintino Remix)

== Notes ==
- A "You Know What" did not enter the Single Top 100, but peaked at number 10 on the Dutch Top 40 chart.
- B "Dynamite" did not enter the Single Top 100, but peaked at number 16 on the Dutch Dance chart.
- C "Escape (Into the Sunset)" did not enter the Single Top 100, but peaked at number 3 on the Dutch Dance chart.
- D "Escape (Into the Sunset)" did not enter the Ultratop 50, but peaked at number 84 on the Flemish Ultratip chart.
