= Lucky Fonz III =

Dutch singer-songwriter

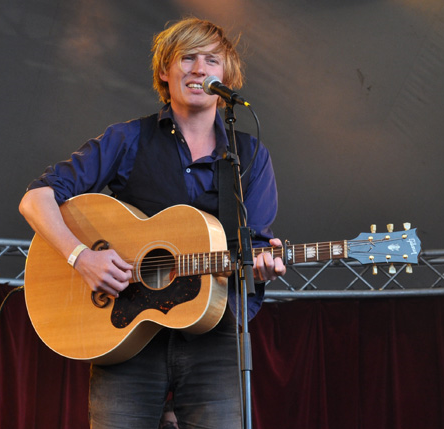

Background information
- Origin: Nijmegen, Netherlands
- Genres: Singer-Songwriter
- Years active: 2005–
- Labels: Top Notch; Independent; MGM Distribution
- Website: Official website

Lucky Fonz III (born in 1981 as Otto Fons Wichers) is a Dutch singer-songwriter from Rotterdam, Netherlands.

== History ==
Wichers studied at the University of Amsterdam and the University of Edinburg when he recorded his first titleless album in 2005. After winning the Grote Prijs van Nederland in the category singer-songwriter, Lucky Fonz III received more media attention. In 2007 the second album, called Life is short was released. In 2008 he did a serie of monthly live performances at VARA's De Wereld Draait Door, a Dutch talkshow on Nederland 3. In 2009 he did his first US tour including a performance at SxSW. In 2009 A family like yours. The single Ik heb een meisje entered the Dutch charts in May 2010 and is a precursor of the new album Hoe je honing maakt, which was released on 8 October 2010.

He has released several albums since, including 'All of Amsterdam' (2013), 'In je Nakie' (2016), 'Multimens' (2019), 'Hemellichamen' (2022) and 'De Zachte Krachten' (2026).

His debut novel 'Van de goden vervuld' was published in 2024 and nominated for the Hebban Debut Award 2025.

== Discography ==
=== Albums ===
- Lucky Fonz III, 2005
- Life is short, 2007
- A family like yours, 2009
- Hoe je honing maakt, 2010
- All of Amsterdam, 2013
- In je nakie, 2016
- Multimens, 2019
- Hemellichamen, 2022
- De Zachte Krachten, 2026

=== Singles ===
- Ik heb een meisje, 2010
- Diana, 2011
- Zondag, 2017
