= Rap das Armas =

Single by Cidinho & Doca

from the album Elite Squad (Soundtrack)
- Released: 2008
- Recorded: 2007
- Genre: Funk proibidão; hip-hop
- Length: 3:27
- Songwriters: MC Doca, MC Cidinho (2008 version); MC Júnior, MC Leonardo (original 1990s version)

Music video
- "Rap das Armas" on YouTube

"Rap das Armas" (English: "Rap of Weapons") is a 1990s song originally written and performed by Brazilian funk duo Júnior e Leonardo. It has lyrics in Brazilian Portuguese written on the melody of the 1986 song "Your Love" by the English rock band The Outfield.

Brazilian funk proibidão duo Cidinho and Doca, made up of MC Cidinho and MC Doca, recorded and released a cover of the song, making it an international hit both in 2008 and in 2009. The duo are two prominent proibidão singers in Brazil, proibidão referring to songs which are banned from airplay by order of the Brazilian courts, in this case due to alleged crime apology.

The song enjoyed success in the mid-1990s, but would only reach its peak in popularity after appearing in the soundtrack of box office hit film Elite Squad (Portuguese: Tropa de Elite) in 2007.

Following the song's success, the record was subject to many remixes from 2008 to 2011, like that of Dutch DJ Quintino, which became popular throughout 2009 in European nightclubs and reached #1 in The Netherlands and in Sweden.

== Early-to-mid 1990s original version ==
The song is considered part of the "Funk carioca" movement that started with the release of the album Funk Brasil in 1989, produced by DJ Marlboro, a compilation considered the initial milestone of the movement. The movement itself was then solidified with a string of albums and songs including the first-ever version of "Rap das Armas", written by sibling MCs Júnior e Leonardo in 1992 and recorded in 1995. The song starts as a praise to Brazil and Rio de Janeiro's beauties, and gradually transforms into a protest against firearms and urban violence. Although the text called for peace and was against violence, it was still banned for mentioning names of a great number of weapons including Intratec (a semi-automatic pistol), .45 ACP, FMK, Uzi, 7.62×51mm NATO and 7.65×21mm Parabellum rifles, hand grenades, .44 Magnum, Beretta, Madsen (referred in the song as an "android hunter") and automatic weapons. Leonardo said the naming of these weapons was facilitated by his day job as a newsstand attendant, where he frequently came across references to them in the news. The refrain of the record was interpolated from the 1986 song "Your Love" by the English rock band The Outfield, replacing the lyrics with the sound of a machine gun, imitated through the rendition "pa ra pa pa..."

== 1994: Cidinho e Doca version ==
While MC Júnior & MC Leonardo's original version would only be recorded for the first time in 1995, the duo began performing the song live at parties by 1992, and in 1994 an unlicensed version of the song was peforemed by MCs Cidinho and Doca, a duo popular for the song "Rap da felicidade". This version made changes to the lyrics of the song, including to the names of some of the firearms used, adding AR-15, 12-gauge, 5.7×28mm pistols, Uru, Glock, AK-47, Winchester rifle, M16, .50 and .30 calibre weapons. But Júnior and Leonardo criticized the new version, saying it went for the opposite message they were seeking, as they felt it praised violence instead of criticizing it. Despite the disavowal, Cidinho and Doca could not be litigated for their version because it "was not commercialized", as it lacked a recorded version and radio airplay.

== 2007: "Elite Squad" film soundtrack ==
The 1990s song was rerecorded by MCs Júnior and Leonardo with amended lyrics for the soundtrack of the 2007 film Elite Squad, directed by José Padilha. The film was a box-office hit domestically, and soon became the highest-grossing film of the year in Brazil. The original 1995 recording by Júnior and Leonardo was included in the soundtrack along with the 2007 remix, however it was a recording of the version by MC Cidinho and Doca that became most popular following the release of the film.

The lyrics of the remixed version were modified in order to make it sound like a social protest, which was not the intention of the original 1990s version. The music was also inspired by kuduro, informally known as the "funk carioca of Angola". The filmmakers ultimately preferred using the original 1995 version in the film.

The song vividly illustrates the daily invasion of favelas by the elite squad of the police in order to fight drug trafficking, as it is clear from its own title. Its lyrics reference the firearms popular among drug dealers and police officers.

Despite its popularity, no version of "Rap das Armas" was ever played on Brazilian radio due to its controversial nature and it was abruptly removed from the Elite Squad film soundtrack album two weeks after its release, due to its alleged praise of drug consumption and support of the drug dealer and criminal faction side in Rio de Janeiro's war on crime.

== 2008-2011: "Rap das Armas" song remixes ==
European DJs made many remix versions, primarily of the Cidinho and Doca rendition rather than the original by Júnior and Leonardo.

The first well known remix was made in Portugal in 2008, where it became a huge hit. This version was also a big hit in many other European countries.

Dutch DJ Quintino made his own version that reached the number 1 in The Netherlands in February 2009, staying at the top of the chart for 2 weeks.

"Rap das Armas" was an even bigger hit in Sweden, where it stayed at the top of the Swedish singles charts for a total of 4 weeks in the summer of 2009. The supporters of Stockholm football team Djurgårdens IF Fotboll like to sing the machine gun-like chorus during the games of their club.

In 2011 rapper Flo Rida released music that samples "Rap das Armas", with the recording being produced by DJ Frank E. However, it was not included in the Flo Rida's 2012 album Wild Ones.

== Other versions and parodies ==
The song has been subject to many versions, remixes and even parodies by various disc jockeys throughout Europe.

Well-known versions include a dance version known as "Lucana Club Mix", a remix by "Rockstarzz featuring Antoine Montana and DJ Bo", "Parapapa" by "DJ Jan" and a parody by "DJ Maurice and Boldheadz", entitled "Parapapaprika".

South African artist Snotkop used the chorus and the melody in his song "Parapapa", though the lyrics in Afrikaans have no connection with the original ones.

There is also a Greek version entitled "Πάρα πολύ" (Very much), by Laïko music singer Giorgos Tsalikis, but its lyrics are also unrelated to those of the original song, which are rewritten in Greek language.

== Charts ==
=== Weekly charts ===
Chart (2008–2009)	Peak position
Belgium (Ultratop 50 Flanders)	30
Belgium (Ultratip Bubbling Under Wallonia)	23
Finland (Suomen virallinen lista)	12
France (SNEP)	25
Israel (Media Forest)	3
Netherlands (Dutch Top 40)	1
Netherlands (Single Top 100)	1
Sweden (Sverigetopplistan)	1
Switzerland (Schweizer Hitparade)	79
Chart (2015)	Peak position
Slovenia (SloTop50)	49

=== Year-end charts ===
Chart (2009)	Position
Netherlands (Dutch Top 40)	37
Netherlands (Single Top 100)	25
Sweden (Sverigetopplistan)	10
