= One Thousand Voices =

Single by The Voice of Holland

Single by The Voice of Holland
- Released: 16 September 2011
- Recorded: 2011
- Genre: Pop
- Length: 3:19
- Label: 8ball Music
- Songwriters: Tjeerd Oosterhuis, Klaus Derendorf, Hiten Bharadia, Alfred Tuohey
- Producers: Tjeerd Oosterhuis, Klaus D

"One Thousand Voices" is a single by the coaches of the Dutch television programme The Voice of Holland. The song was released on 16 September 2011. The song was written by Tjeerd Oosterhuis, Klaus Derendorf, Hiten Bharadia and Alfred Tuohey and was produced by Oosterhuis and Derendorf.

It reached the peak position in both the Dutch Top 40 and the Mega Single Top 100. It also reached the peak position in the 3FM Megatop 50, the iTunes Top 30 and the Download Top 50. The song stayed only for one week at the peak position in all five charts.

The first performance of "One Thousand Voices" was at the first episode of the second season of The Voice of Holland. It was performed by the coaches: Angela Groothuizen, Marco Borsato, VanVelzen and Nick & Simon (Nick Schilder and Simon Keizer). "One Thousand Voices" can be seen as the theme song of the second season of The Voice of Holland.

== Charts ==
=== Weekly charts ===
Chart (2011)	Peak position
Netherlands (Dutch Top 40)	1
Netherlands (Mega Single Top 100)	1
Netherlands (3FM Megatop 50)	1

=== Year-end charts ===
Chart (2011)	Position
Netherlands (Dutch Top 40)	83
Netherlands (Single Top 100)	84

== See also ==
- List of Dutch Top 40 number-one singles of 2011
