= Mi Rowsu =

2007 single by Damaru

"Mi Rowsu" is a song written and performed by Surinamese singer Damaru. The song became a great success in Suriname. Another version of the song, which features Jan Smit, became a huge hit in the Netherlands.

== Damaru version ==
"Mi Rowsu"

Single by Damaru

from the album Mi Rowsu
- Released: 2007
- Recorded: 2007
- Genre: Reggae
- Songwriter(s): Damaru

Damaru singles chronology
"Yu Na Mi Engel" (2007)	"Mi Rowsu" (2007)	"Mi Rowsu (Tuintje in mijn hart)" (2009)

"Mi Rowsu" (English: My Rose) is a single by Surinamese singer Damaru from his album Mi Rowsu. He wrote the song for his daughter Dinoura. The song was released in Suriname in 2007. It reached the peak position of the Surinam charts and stayed there for nine weeks. Two years later, the song was released in the Netherlands. It reached the 7th position in the Mega Single Top 100 and the 14th position in the Dutch Top 40.

=== Charts and certifications ===
==== Charts ====
Chart (2007–09)	Peak position
Netherlands (Mega Single Top 100)	7
Netherlands (Dutch Top 40)	14

=== Release history ===
Region	Date	Format
Suriname	2007	CD single, 7-inch
Netherlands	2009	CD single, 7-inch

== Damaru featuring Jan Smit version ==
"Mi Rowsu (Tuintje in mijn hart)"

Single by Damaru featuring Jan Smit
- Released: 2009
- Recorded: 2009
- Genre: Reggae
- Length: 3:34
- Label: Top Notch
- Songwriter(s): Damaru

Damaru singles chronology
"Mi Rowsu" (2007/09)	"Mi Rowsu (Tuintje in mijn hart)" (2009)

Jan Smit singles chronology
"Je naam in de sterren" (2008)	"Mi Rowsu (Tuintje in mijn hart)" (2009)	"Leef nu het kan" (2010)

Damaru recorded a new version of "Mi Rowsu" with famous Dutch singer Jan Smit, under the name "Mi Rowsu (Tuintje in mijn hart)" (My Rose (Garden In My Heart)). This song became a huge hit in the Netherlands. It reached the peak position in both the Mega Single Top 100 and the Dutch Top 40. The song won the "Sterren.nl Award for Best Song of 2009" and the "100% NL Award for Biggest Hit of 2009". In September 2009, the song reached the platinum status in the Netherlands (20,000 singles sold).

=== Charts and certifications ===
==== Charts ====
Chart (2009)	Peak position
Netherlands (Mega Single Top 100)	1
Netherlands (Dutch Top 40)	1

==== Decade-end charts ====
Chart (2000–09)	Position
Netherlands (Single Top 100)	37

==== Certifications ====
Country	Certification
Netherlands (NVPI)	Platinum

=== Awards ===
Year	Award	Result
2009	Sterren.nl Award for Best Song of 2009	Won
2009	100% NL Award for Biggest Hit of 2009	Won

== See also ==
- List of Dutch Top 40 number-one singles of 2009
