= Nergens zonder jou =

Single by Guus Meeuwis featuring Gers Pardoel
- Released: 4 November 2011
- Genre: Pop
- Length: 3:50:00
- Label: Universal
- Songwriters: Guus Meeuwis, Jan Willem Rozenboom, Jan Willem Roy
- Producers: Rob van Donselaar, Jan Willem Rozenboom

Guus Meeuwis singles chronology
"Als ze danst" (2011)	"Nergens zonder jou" (2011)

Gers Pardoel singles chronology
"Ik neem je mee" (2011)	"Nergens zonder jou" (2011)	"Bagagedrager" (2012)

Music video
- "Nergens zonder jou" on YouTube

"Nergens zonder jou" (Dutch pronunciation: [ˈnɛrɣən ˌsɔndər ˈjʌu]; "Nowhere Without You") is a song recorded by Dutch artists Guus Meeuwis and Gers Pardoel. It was released on 4 November 2011 through Universal Music Group. The song was written by Guus Meeuwis, Jan Willem Rozenboom and Jan Willem Roy and was produced by Rob van Donselaar and Rozenboom. At first, "Nergens zonder jou" was recorded only by Guus Meeuwis, for his eighth studio album Armen open, without rap vocals by Gers Pardoel. Later, the artists decided to collaborate and the song including Gers Pardoel's rap was released as a digital download.

== Track listing ==
- Digital download
1. "Nergens zonder jou" – 3:50

== Charts and certifications ==
=== Weekly charts ===
Chart (2011)	Peak position
Netherlands (Dutch Top 40)	5
Netherlands (Single Top 100)	5

=== Year-end charts ===
Chart (2011)	Position
Netherlands (Dutch Top 40)	70
Netherlands (Single Top 100)	69

== Release history ==
Region	Date	Format
Netherlands	4 November 2011	Digital download
