= Sandro Silva (DJ) =

Dutch DJ & record producer (born 1992)

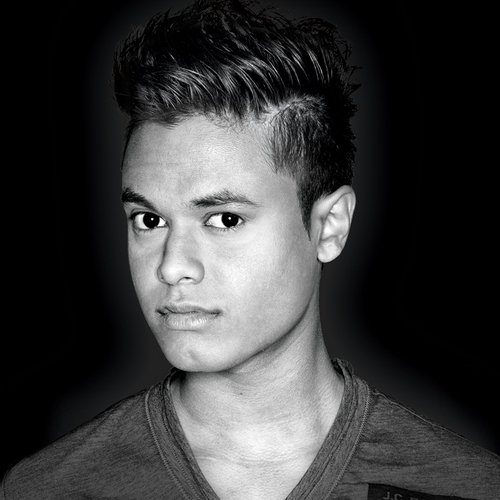
- Silva in 2012

Background information
- Born: Shandro Jahangier; 19 February 1992 (age 34); Zoetermeer, Netherlands
- Genres: Electro house; big room house; Dutch house; progressive house
- Occupations: Musician; DJ; record producer
- Instruments: Piano; guitar; synthesizer; drums
- Years active: 2009–present
- Labels: Big Beat Records, Atlantic Records, Spinnin', Dim Mak Records, Armada, Smash The House, Revealed Recordings, Musical Freedom, Mixmash Records
- Website: sandrosilva.tv/

Shandro Jahangier (born 19 February 1992), better known by his stage name Sandro Silva, is a Dutch DJ and record producer. He is known for his broad, energetic sound combined with a musical depth acquired by his years of piano study. Silva produced the song "Epic" with Quintino, which is considered to be the first big room house track ever created.

== Biography and career ==
Silva was born as Shandro Jahangier on 19 February 1992 in Zoetermeer, the Netherlands.

He started his career in 2009 at the age of 17. Through DJ and music producer Laidback Luke's coaching and support, he was able to develop his DJ and producing skills at such a rapid pace. His release, Prom Night was featured as an Essential Choice on Pete Tong’s BBC radio show. He has released his own tracks on (Steve Aoki's) Dimmak Records, (Laidback Luke's) Mixmash Records, Musical Freedom, Newstate Records and his song with Bizzey, "Get Lower" was released in 2011 through Atlantic Records. His track, "Epic", featuring Quintino, became a major hit and is widely considered as the first big room house track ever created. The song reached the top of the dance-charts worldwide, including the Netherlands, Silva's homeland, where it peaked at the top of the Dutch Top 40 and the Mega Single Top 100.

In addition to working on his own projects, Silva is a skilled remixer, remixing for the likes of Pitbull, Ricky Blaze, Laidback Luke and Calvin Harris. He has played in clubs and festivals including EDC Las Vegas, LIV Miami, Creamfields Liverpool, Ministry of Sound London, Privilege and Ushuaia Ibiza.

== Discography ==
=== Extended plays ===
Title	Album details
Ambition	Released: May 19, 2017; Format: Digital download; Label: Buygore
Royal (with KEVU)	Released: June 22, 2020; Format: Digital download; Label: Rave Culture

=== Charting Singles ===
Year	Title	Peak chart positions												Album
Year	Title	NLD	AUS	AUT	BEL (Vl)	BEL (Wa)	FIN	FRA	GER	IRL	SWE	SWI	UK	Album
2011	"Epic" (with Quintino)	1	—	—	16	34	—	—	—	—	—	14	—	Non-album singles
2013	"Puna"	—	—	—	13^{[A]}	—	—	—	—	—	—	—	—	Non-album singles
2014	"Miraj" (with Junkie Kid)	—	—	—	18^{[A]}	—	—	—	—	—	—	—	—	Non-album singles
2015	"Aftermath" (with Quintino)	—	—	—	2^{[A]}	16^{[A]}	—	—	—	—	—	—	—	Non-album singles
"—" denotes a recording that did not chart or was not released in that territory.

=== Singles ===
List is not exhaustive below:

- 2010: "Prom Night" [Mixmash Records]
- 2010: "Yearbook" [Confidence (Spinnin')]
- 2010: "Only You" [Spinnin Records]
- 2010: "Paranoia" [Spinnin Records]
- 2011: "Push Push" [Mixmash Records]
- 2011: "Resurrection" [New State Music]
- 2011: "Get Lower" (featuring Bizzey) (Big Beat Records)
- 2011: "Epic" (with Quintino) [Musical Freedom]
- 2012: "Mach 5" [New State Music]
- 2012: "Gladiator" (with Oliver Twizt) [Mixmash Records]
- 2012: "Core" [Hysteria Recs]
- 2013: "Libra" [Ultra Records]
- 2013: "Let Go Tonight" (with Jack Miz)
- 2013: "Puna" [Spinnin' Records]
- 2013: "Payback" [Revealed Recordings]
- 2014: "Miraj" (with Junkie Kid) [DOORN (Spinnin')]
- 2014: "Throne" [Fly Eye Records]
- 2014: "Chasing Dreams" (with D.O.D.) [Mixmash]
- 2014: "Symphony" (with Arston) [Revealed Recordings]
- 2014: "200K" [Free]
- 2014: "P.L.U.R." [Armada Music]
- 2015: "Firestarter" [Armada Music]
- 2015: "Aftermath" (with Quintino) [Spinnin' Records]
- 2015: "Someone Like U" (with Dirtcaps featuring Cathy Dennis) [Armada Music]
- 2015: "Vandals" (with Thomas Newson) [Smash The House]
- 2015: "BYOS (Bring Your Own Speakers)" (with Futuristic Polar Bears) [Armada Music]
- 2015: "Hell of a Night" (with GTA (Good Times Ahead)) [Warner Music]
- 2015: "HooYa" (with (S)haan) [Armada Music]
- 2016: "Takeover" (with Arston) [Revealed Recordings]
- 2016: "Spartan" [Mainstage Music]
- 2016: "Breaking Walls" (featuring Rochelle) [Armada Music]
- 2016: "Stay Inside" (featuring Kepler) [Armada Music]
- 2017: "That Girl" (with Badd Dimes and F1rstman) [Revealed Recordings]
- 2017: "Second Life" (with Richy George) [Revealed Recordings]
- 2018: "Running Back" [Revealed Recordings]
- 2018: "Show Me" (with Anjulie) [Interstellar]
- 2019: "Story of a Violin" (with Broz Rodriguez & Calixto) [Smash The House]
- 2019: "Harder" (with Dimaro) [Smash The House]
- 2019: "Omerta" (with SaberZ) [Rave Culture]
- 2019: "Activate" (with Max Adrian and Meikle) [Revealed Recordings]
- 2019: "Genesis" (with Max Adrian and Rion) [Self-released]
- 2019: "Baile" (with Michael Prado) [Smash The House]
- 2020: "Raise Your Flag" [Self-released]
- 2020: "Wizards of the Beats" (with W&W and Zafrir) [Rave Culture]
- 2020: "Raveolution" (with Graham Bell) [Rave Culture]
- 2020: "X" (with Reggio) [Revealed Recordings]
- 2020: "Lost In <3" [Self-released]
- 2020: "Raver Dome" (with 3 Are Legend and Justin Prime) [Smash The House]
- 2020: "Russian Roulette" (with SaberZ) [Rave Culture]
- 2020: "Royal" (with Kevu) [Rave Culture]
- 2020: "Ibiza 7AM" [Rave Culture]
- 2021: "Heaven & Hell" (with Axmo) [Rave Culture]
- 2021: "Outta Control" (with Jaxx & Vega) [Rave Culture]
- 2021: "Forever" [Rave Culture]
- 2021: "This Is Our Legacy" (with W&W and Justin Prime) [Rave Culture]
- 2021: "Risk It All" [Rave Culture]
- 2021: "Founding Fathers" (with Olly James) [Rave Culture]

=== Remixes ===
- 2010: Yolanda Be Cool - "We No Speak Americano" (Sandro Silva Remix) [Kontor Records]
- 2011: Yasmeen and Damisn - "Rise" (Sandro Silva Remix) [Strictly Rhythm Records]
- 2011: Angger Dimas and Christian Luke - "Chiquila" (Sandro Silva Remix) [Vicious Recordings]
- 2011: Steve Aoki and Laidback Luke featuring Lil Jon - "Turbulence" (Sandro Silva Remix) [Mixmash Records]
- 2012: David Guetta featuring Sia - "She Wolf (Falling to Pieces)" (Sandro Silva Remix) [What A Music]
- 2012: Rita Ora - "How We Do (Party)" (Sandro Silva Remix)
- 2012: Sandro Silva and Oliver Twizt - "Gladiator" (Sandro Silva Remix) [Mixmash Records]
- 2012: Drop The Lime - "Darkness" (Sandro Silva Remix) [Ultra Records]
- 2013: Dirtyrockers - "Shockwave" (Sandro Silva Remix) [Big Boss Records]
- 2013: D.O.D - "Break" (Sandro Silva Remix)
- 2013: DJ Pauly D - "Back to Love" (featuring Jay Sean) (Sandro Silva Remix) [G-Note Records]
- 2014: Gia and X-Vertigo - "Bombs" (Sandro Silva Remix) [X-Vertigo Attack!]
- 2016: Vigel - "Bounce to the Rhythm" (Sandro Silva Edit) [Armada Trice]
