= Aux Raus =

Former Dutch hardcore-punk band

- Origin: Amsterdam, Netherlands
- Genres: Hardcore-punk
- Years active: 2004-2012
- Label: TopNotch
- Past members: Bastiaan Bosma, Luuk Bouwman
- Website: http://www.auxraus.com

Aux Raus was a musical duo consisting of Bastiaan Bosma and Luuk Bouwman. Their music can be described as a kind of hardcore-punk with techno beats. They are also described as "gabber punk". The live shows of Aux Raus often ended up with a half-naked frontman.

== History ==
In 2006 Aux Raus released the album This Is How This Works in Mexico on the Nuevos Ricos label, and the following year in the Netherlands on the Amsterdam record label Fear Recordings. The album won a 3VOOR12 award and Essent Awards for best album. The duo performed at festivals, including Lowlands 2007 and Lowlands 2009, Noorderslag 2007 and on stage at Club 3voor12. At Noorderslag 2008 they were winner of one of the Essent Awards for best album.

The band also contributed to the RMXXX album The Moi Non Plus.

=== TopNotch ===
On 21 August 2009 the album The Brick Is In The Air was released on the nederhop label TopNotch. Aux Raus was the first gabber punk act on TopNotch. Before that they had only hip hop, reggae, R & B and bubbling. The album was well received and in 2010 the duo released a remix album.

For some (festival) shows the band performed with an extended crew, under the name Aux Raus Deluxe. The role of second guitarist was filled alternately by Oeds Beydals and Thomas Sciarone. Jane and Kiki provided the background vocals. After the release of their third album, All Creeping Things Stopped Creeping, the band performed with a second guitarist, again filled alternately by Beydals and Sciarone.

On 13 July 2011 Aux Raus announced the end of the group. On 21 January 2012 Aux Raus played their last show at the Paradiso in Amsterdam.

== Discography ==
Releases

Year	Album	Country	Label
2006	This Is How This Works	Mexico	Nuevos Ricos
2007	This Is How This Works	Holland	Angst Records
2009	The Brick Is in the Air	Holland	TopNotch
2010	Aux Raux Remixes	Holland	TopNotch
2011	All Creeping Things Stopped Creeping	Holland	TopNotch

=== Peak position ===
Album title	Release date	Charting in the Dutch Album Top 100			Comments
Album title	Release date	Date of entry	Highest	Weeks	Comments
The brick is in the air	2009	29-08-2009	93	1	
