= Roderick Hietbrink =

Dutch visual artist

- Born: 1975 (age 50–51); Gorssel, Netherlands
- Education: Rijksakademie van beeldende kunsten
- Known for: Visual art
- Website: https://www.roderickhietbrink.com

Roderick Hietbrink (born 15 June 1975) is a contemporary Dutch visual artist, living and working in Oslo, Norway. His practice encompasses video art, installation art, performance art, sculpture and photography.

Roderick Hietbrink studied visual arts at the Academy of Art and Design St. Joost in Breda (1995–1999), the Piet Zwart Institute in Rotterdam (2001–2002) and the Rijksakademie van beeldende kunsten in Amsterdam (2011–2012).

== Work ==
Through the use of different media Hietbrink questions and explores different aspects of the psychological and inherent conflicts between the rational and instinctive self. He juxtaposes the everyday with the surreal, and the cultivated with the instinctive, in order to address and blur the divisions between these traditionally binary fields in spatial installations and live performances that can be endearing and humorous, while at the same time painful and sad.

== Selected group and solo exhibitions ==
2018

- 33rd Bienal de São Paulo
- Into Nature, Netherlands

2017

- Kunsthall Oslo

2015

- P/////AKT, Amsterdam
- LIAF Biennale, Lofoten Norway
- Unge Kunsteres Samfund (UKS), Oslo

2013

- Stedelijk Museum Amsterdam (collection presentation)
- 5th Moscow Biennale (Special programme)
- De Appel Amsterdam
