= Gers Pardoel =

Dutch rapper

Gers Pardoel or Gerwin Schalk

Background information
- Also known as: Gers Pardoel; Gers
- Born: Gerwin Pardoel; 12 May 1981 (age 45); Nijmegen, Netherlands
- Genre: Nederhop
- Occupations: Rapper, songwriter
- Instrument: Vocals
- Years active: 2009–present
- Labels: TopNotch, Universal Music
- Website: gerspardoel.nl

Gerwin Pardoel (born 12 May 1981), better known by his stage name Gers Pardoel or mononymously as Gers, is a Dutch rapper. He rose to fame in 2009, due to his successful collaboration with The Opposites on the single "Broodje Bakpao". Pardoel's debut studio album Deze wereld is van jou was released in November 2011 and was certified Platinum by the NVPI. The Nederhop artist is best known for his number-one single "Ik neem je mee", which became the most successful Dutch-language and Dutch-artist hit in the Dutch Top 40 ever.

== Biography ==
=== 1981–2002: Early life ===
Gerwin Pardoel was born on 12 May 1981 in Nijmegen, thirty-five minutes before his younger twin brother Robbie. When Pardoel was young, his father was purchaser at a nursing home. Later, his father worked for the theme park De Efteling in Kaatsheuvel. His mother was a housewife and took care of the children.

When Pardoel was 17 years old, his life changed when his mother died from cancer. His life was turned upside down and the relation with his father deteriorated enormously. To escape from his difficult home situation, Pardoel looked for refuge in roller skating. He was a very fanatical roller skater and wanted to reach the Dutch roller skating top. Together with Steffen Haars and Huub Smit (nowadays known as the characters of New Kids), he practiced almost every day in an inline skate hall in 's-Hertogenbosch. The hall became a "new home" for Pardoel. He reached the ninth position in a national roller skating competition.

=== 2002–2010: Career beginnings ===
Pardoel became interested in hip hop. In Rotterdam, he met rapper Postman (Remon Stotijn). Postman and his then-wife Anouk helped him to discover the world of hip hop. They made up Pardoel's stage name Gers. Despite the fact that the name Gers is very similar to his own name Gerwin, "gers" also means "cool" or something like that in Rotterdam dialect. Postman highly influenced Pardoel's performing stile.

Pardoel improved his rapping skills and began developing himself as a producer. He started working on songs for a future album. At some point, Pardoel showed his old friend Steffen Haars (who had become director of New Kids in the meantime) some of his raps. Haars was impressed and put him in touch with rappers Sef and Big2. That resulted in the recording of the song "Broodje Bakpao". The hit single, which was included in the soundtrack of the movie New Kids Turbo and reached the first position in the Mega Single Top 100, resulted in an enormous rise of fame for Pardoel. Due to this success, Pardoel received a recording contract at Dutch label TopNotch. The next success for Pardoel was the single "Ik ga hard". This song, by The Partysquad featuring Gers Pardoel, Adje, Jayh and Reverse, became a popular song among teenagers.

=== 2011–present: Deze wereld is van jou and De toekomst is van ons ===
On 14 October 2011, Pardoel released his debut studio album Deze wereld is van jou. After a lot of work (the recordings of the album started already in 2009), the release was finally there. The second single of the album, "Ik neem je mee", became a great success and reached the number-one position in both the Dutch Top 40 and the Mega Single Top 100. The album was certified Platinum by the NVPI. The album also included the single "Bagagedrager" among others. Three years later, another studio album was released, called De toekomst is van ons. It didn't match the success of its predecessor, but includes the Platinum-certified single "Louise".

Due to his musical success in the Flemish part of Belgium, Pardoel became a coach in the Flemish version of The Voice Kids in the shows 4th and 5th seasons. In the summer of 2021, the Belgian popular newspaper Het Laatste Nieuws published stories in which Sélina van Gool (Pardoel's former partner, mother of his children, and also his former manager) accused him of domestic abuse, both physical and psychological in nature. Van Gool also posted on Instagram on the topic, screenshots of her private profile are visible in the newspaper articles. The newspaper added specifically that they were able to check police reports supplied by van Gool which confirmed her allegations. Subsequently Pardoel did not return in the 2022 season of The Voice Kids. It is noteworthy that both VTM which airs The Voice Kids and Het Laatste Nieuws are brands of Mediahuis. However, also in 2022, Pardoel was welcomed as the presenter of the Flemish version of Come Dance With Me on Play4, a channel of SBS Belgium.

== Discography ==
Gers Pardoel discography
- Studio albums: 2
- Singles: 11

=== Studio albums ===
Title	Album details	Peak chart positions		Certifications
Title	Album details	NL	BEL (FLA)	Certifications
Deze wereld is van jou	Released: 14 October 2011; Label: TopNotch	3	7	BEA: Gold; NVPI: Platinum
De toekomst is van ons	Released: 26 May 2014; Label: TopNotch	6	6	
Voor m'n kids	Released: 3 November 2017; Label: Mickey Bars	—	4	BEA: Gold
Juli (with Mennoboomin)	Released: 6 July 2018; Label: Goudrocc	—	176	
"—" denotes items which were not released in that country or failed to chart.

=== Singles ===
==== As lead artist ====
Title	Year	Peak chart positions			Certifications	Album
Title	Year	NL Top 40	NL Top 100	BEL (FLA)	Certifications	Album
"Morgen ben ik rijk"	2011	— (Note: "Morgen ben ik rijk" did not enter the Dutch Top 40, but peaked at number six on the Tipparade chart, which acts as an extension to the Top 40.)	61	— (Note: "Morgen ben ik rijk" did not enter the Ultratop 50, but peaked at number 17 on the Ultratip chart, which acts as an extension to the Ultratop 50.)		Deze wereld is van jou
"Ik neem je mee"	2011	1	1	2	BEA: Platinum; NVPI: Platinum	Deze wereld is van jou
"Bagagedrager" (featuring Sef)	2012	2	2	3	BEA: Gold	Deze wereld is van jou
"Pijn"	2012	27	35	27		Deze wereld is van jou
"Liever dan lief" (with Doe Maar)	2012	7	5	—		De toekomst is van ons
"#VFD"	2013	— (Note: "#VFD" did not enter the Dutch Top 40, but peaked at number 13 on the Tipparade chart, which acts as an extension to the Top 40.)	—	— (Note: "#VFD" did not enter the Ultratop 50, but peaked at number 12 on the Ultratip chart, which acts as an extension to the Ultratop 50.)		De toekomst is van ons
"Dankbaarheid"	2014	37	44	—		De toekomst is van ons
"Louise"	2014	26	20	6	BEA: Gold; NVPI: Platinum	De toekomst is van ons
"Dans met mij" (featuring Willem)	2014	— (Note: "Dans met mij" did not enter the Dutch Top 40, but peaked at number 16 on the Tipparade chart, which acts as an extension to the Top 40.)	—	— (Note: "Dans met mij" did not enter the Ultratop 50, but peaked at number 56 on the Ultratip chart, which acts as an extension to the Ultratop 50.)		De toekomst is van ons
"Nooit meer alleen"	2015	—	—	— (Note: "Nooit meer alleen" did not enter the Ultratop 50, but peaked at number 32 on the Ultratip chart, which acts as an extension to the Ultratop 50.)		De toekomst is van ons
"Festivals"	2015	—	—	— (Note: "Festivals" did not enter the Ultratop 50, but peaked at number 35 on the Ultratip chart, which acts as an extension to the Ultratop 50.)		De toekomst is van ons
"Als jij langsloopt" (featuring Boef)	2016	—	—	— (Note: "Als jij langsloopt" did not enter the Ultratop 50, but peaked at number 21 on the Ultratip chart, which acts as an extension to the Ultratop 50.)		Non-album single
"Boeng" (live)	2017	—	—	20		Voor m'n kids
"Zo bijzonder" (live)	2017	—	—	15		Voor m'n kids
"Anne" (live)	2017	—	—	44		Voor m'n kids
"Ma chérie"	2017	—	—	25		Voor m'n kids
"Lila lakens van satijn"	2018	—	—	28		Voor m'n kids
"Dom"	2018	—	—	— (Note: "In mijn hoofd" did not enter the Ultratop 50, but peaked at number 13 on the Ultratip chart, which acts as an extension to the Ultratop 50.)		Voor m'n kids
"In mijn hoofd"	2018	—	—	— (Note: "In mijn hoofd" did not enter the Ultratop 50, but peaked at number 13 on the Ultratip chart, which acts as an extension to the Ultratop 50.)		Non-album single
"Zomer" (featuring Jayh)	2019	—	—	42		2020
"Hey jij!!"	2019	—	—	— (Note: "Hey jij!!" did not enter the Ultratop 50, but peaked at number 15 on the Ultratip chart, which acts as an extension to the Ultratop 50.)		2020
"Nooit meer een ander"	2019	—	—	— (Note: "Nooit meer een ander" did not enter the Ultratop 50, but peaked at number three on the Ultratip chart, which acts as an extension to the Ultratop 50.)		2020
"Nachttrein" (featuring Sean Dhondt)	2020	—	—	—		2020
"—" denotes items which were not released in that country or failed to chart.						2020

==== Featured singles ====
Title	Year	Peak chart positions			Album
Title	Year	NL Top 40	NL Top 100	BEL (FLA)	Album
"Broodje Bakpao" (The Opposites featuring Gers and Sef)	2009	2	1	3	Succes / Ik ben Twan
"Ik ga hard" (The Partysquad featuring Adje, Gers, Jayh and Reverse)	2011	16	8	—	Non-album singles
"Nergens zonder jou" (Guus Meeuwis featuring Gers Pardoel)	2011	5	5	—	Non-album singles
"—" denotes items which were not released in that country or failed to chart.

==== Other appearances ====
Title	Year	Peak chart positions		
Title	Year	NL Top 40	NL Top 100	BEL (FLA)
"Koningslied" (song by various Dutch artists for the investiture of Willem-Alexander)	2013	2	1	41
"—" denotes items which were not released in that country or failed to chart.

== Awards and nominations ==
Gers Pardoel awards and nominations
Awards and nominations
Award	Wins	Nominations
3FM Awards	2	5
3VOOR12 Awards	0	1
Edison Awards	0	1
Mega Awards	1	1
Nickelodeon Kids' Choice Awards	0	1
State Awards	0	4
TMF Awards	2	2

Totals (Note: Certain award groups do not simply award one winner. They acknowledge several different recipients, have runners-up, and have third place. Since this is a specific recognition and is different from losing an award, runner-up mentions are considered wins in this award tally. For simplification and to avoid errors, each award in this list has been presumed to have had a prior nomination.)
- Wins: 5
- Nominations: 14

Gers Pardoel has been nominated for several Dutch awards since 2010.

=== 3FM Awards ===
The 3FM Awards is an annual awards ceremony by the Dutch radio station 3FM. Pardoel has been nominated for five awards in 2012 and won two awards of them.

Year	Nominee / work	Award	Result
2012	"Ik neem je mee"	Best Single	Nominated
2012	Deze wereld is van jou	Best Album	Nominated
2012	Gers Pardoel	Best Hiphop Artist	Nominated
2012	Gers Pardoel	Best New Artist	Won
2012	Gers Pardoel	3FM Serious Talent Award	Won

=== 3VOOR12 Awards ===
Every year, the Dutch multimedia platform 3VOOR12 composes a top 100-list of the best songs of the year. Pardoel's song "Ik neem je mee" ended at the 20th position in the list of 2011, while Gotye's song "Somebody That I Used to Know" ended at the first position and became Song of the Year 2011.

Year	Nominee / work	Award	Result
2011	"Ik neem je mee"	Song of the Year	20th

=== Edison Music Awards ===
The Edison Music Awards is an annual Dutch music awards ceremony. The awards are for outstanding achievements in the music industry. It is one of the oldest music awards ceremonies in the world, having been presented since 1960. Pardoel has been nominated once for an Edison Music Award.

Year	Nominee / work	Award	Result
2010	"Broodje Bakpao" (with The Opposites and Sef)	Best Single	Nominated

=== Mega Awards ===
The Mega Award is awarded every year to the best Dutch artist of the year. It is initiated by 3FM, TROS and GfK Dutch Charts. Pardoel received the Mega Award in 2011.

Year	Nominee / work	Award	Result
2011	Gers Pardoel	Mega Award 2011	Won

=== Nickelodeon Kids' Choice Awards ===
The Nickelodeon Kids' Choice Awards is an annual awards show that airs on Nickelodeon that honors the year's biggest television, movie and music acts, as voted by Nickelodeon viewers. Pardoel has been nominated for one of the Netherlands Kids Choice Awards 2012. In 2013 he was nominated as well and won the award.

Year	Nominee / work	Award	Result
2012	Gers Pardoel	Favourite star: Netherlands/Belgium	Nominated

=== State Awards ===
The State Awards are awards for Dutch hip hop and urban artists. The ceremony is held every year since 2008. Pardoel has been nominated four times in 2010 and 2011.

Year	Nominee / work	Award	Result
2010	"Broodje Bakpao" (with The Opposites and Sef)	Best Single	Nominated
2010	Gers Pardoel	Rookie of the Year	Nominated
2011	"Morgen ben ik rijk"	Best Single	Nominated
2011	Gers Pardoel	Best Artist	Nominated

=== TMF Awards ===
The TMF Awards are presented annually by Dutch music channel The Music Factory. Pardoel received two awards.

Year	Nominee / work	Award	Result
2010	"Broodje Bakpao" (with The Opposites and Sef)	Best Video	Won
2010	"Broodje Bakpao" (with The Opposites and Sef)	Super Chart Award	Won
