= Cidinho & Doca =

Brazilian musical duo

Cidinho and Doca
- Born: Sidney da Silva (MC Cidinho); Marcos Paulo de Jesus (MC Doca)
- Genre: Hip-hop
- Years active: 1994–present

Cidinho and Doca (in Portuguese Cidinho e Doca, also as Cidinho & Doca) is a Brazilian hip-hop duo made up of Sidney da Silva (MC Cidinho) and Marcos Paulo de Jesus Peixoto (MC Doca), two funk proibidão singers.

== Career ==
Cidinho e Doca are part of the proibidão ("Strongly Prohibited") subgenre of Funk carioca. Most proibidão songs are banned from public performance or broadcast due to their lyrics promoting drug gangs and related crimes, which limits the genre's reach and keeps its acts highly localized.

Cidinho and Doca are known for their rendition of "Rap das Armas" (English: Rap of Weapons), a 1990s song originally by Junior e Leonardo. This version gained popularity among European electronic DJs experimenting with Brazilian funk remixes throughout the 2000s, earning the song multiple chart spots in Sweden and the Netherlands.

== Discography ==
=== Albums ===
- Eu Só Quero É Ser Feliz (1995)
- É O Bonde da C.D.D (1998)
- Desarme-se (2000)
- Rap das Armas (2008)

=== Singles ===
- "Rap das Armas" (in Brazil) (1994)
- "Rap da Felicidade" (in Brazil) (1995)
- "Rap das Armas" (in Europe) (2008)
- "Rap das Armas (Lucano Radio Mix)" (2009)

=== Compilations ===
- Os Maiores Sucessos 2005 (2005)
