= Damaru (singer) =

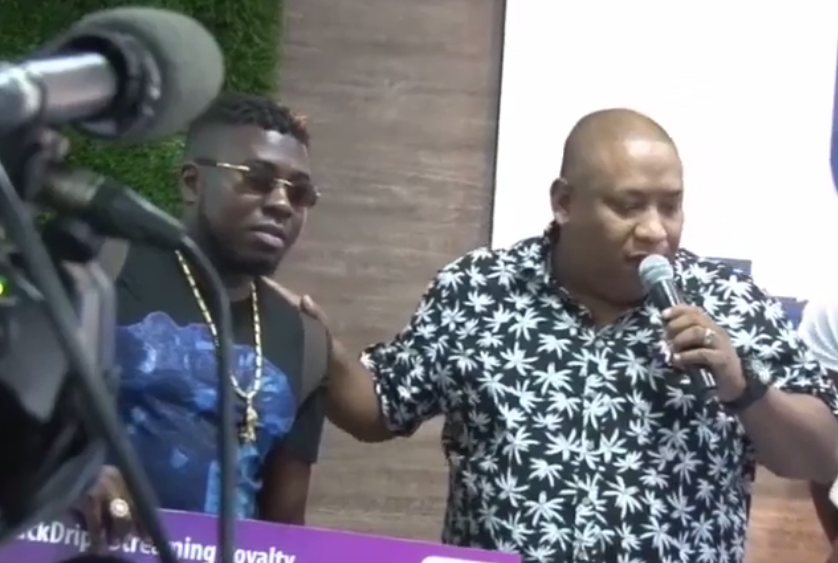
- Damaru (left) in 2019

Background information
- Born: Dino Orpheo Canterburg; 2 July 1986 (age 40); Paramaribo, Suriname
- Genres: Hip Hop, Pop, Reggae
- Occupations: Singer, rapper, film director
- Label: TopNotch
- Website: http://www.damarumusic.com/

Dino Orpheo Canterburg (born 2 July 1986, in Paramaribo), better known by his stage name Damaru, is a Surinamese singer and rapper. He is best known for his song "Mi Rowsu (Tuintje In Mijn Hart)" with Dutch singer Jan Smit.

== Life and career ==
=== Early life and career beginnings ===
Damaru grew up in Paramaribo, the capital of Suriname, in a family with six children. When he was thirteen years old, he started rapping and singing. His singing talents were a great success. Before he started his solo career, he was member of the bands "Lava Boys" and "New Jack Boys". Damaru derived his stage name from his idol Tupac Shakur: the second name of this American rapper was "Amaru". Damaru added the letter D, from his name Dino, and his stage name was born.

=== Suriname ===
In Suriname, Damaru scored several hits, like "Yu Na Mi Engel" (English: You Are My Angel), "Hey Baby" and "Sranang Koningin" (Surinam Queen). In 2007, he scored his biggest hit with "Mi Rowsu" (My Rose), a song he had written for his daughter Denoura. It spent nine weeks at the peak position of the Surinam charts. In 2008, Damaru released his first movie: "Mi Rowsu The Movie".

=== Netherlands ===
In 2009, Damaru went to the Netherlands, in an attempt to get a break through. He toured the country three months, appeared on television and eventually got a recording contract with the major Dutch hip hop label TopNotch. He released "Mi Rowsu" in the Netherlands and the song reached the 7th position in the Mega Single Top 100 and the 14th position in the Dutch Top 40.

Together with Dutch singer Jan Smit Damaru recorded a new version of "Mi Rowsu": "Mi Rowsu (Tuintje In Mijn Hart)" (My Rose (Garden In My Heart)). This song reached the peak position in both the Single Top 100 and the Dutch Top 40. In September 2009, the song reached the platinum status (20,000 singles sold). "Mi Rowsu (Tuintje In Mijn Hart)" also won the "Sterren.nl Award" for "Best Song of 2009" and the "100% NL Award" for "Biggest Hit of 2009".

== Discography ==
=== Albums ===
Year	Title	Peak chart positions	
Year	Title	NL	SU
	Mi Rowsu	-	-
	The Best of Damaru	-	-
2009	Schatje Lief	-	-
2011	Tuintje In Mijn Hart	-	-

=== Singles ===
Year	Title	Peak chart positions		
Year	Title	NL Top 40	NL Top 100	SU
	"Yu Na Mi Engel"	-	-	-
	"Hey Baby"	-	-	-
	"Sranang Koningin"	-	-	-
2007	"Mi Rowsu"	-	-	1
2009	"Mi Rowsu"	14	7	-
2009	"Mi Rowsu (Tuintje In Mijn Hart)" (featuring Jan Smit)	1	1	-

== Awards ==
Year	Nominated work	Award	Result
2009	"Mi Rowsu (Tuintje In Mijn Hart)" (featuring Jan Smit)	Sterren.nl Award for Best Song of 2009	Won
2009	"Mi Rowsu (Tuintje In Mijn Hart)" (featuring Jan Smit)	100% NL Award for Biggest Hit of 2009	Won
