= TopNotch =

Dutch record label

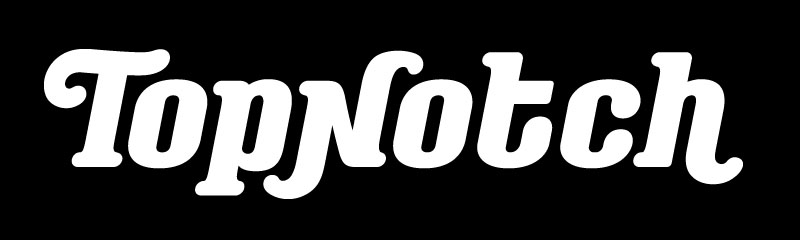

TopNotch is a Dutch record label specializing in hip-hop. The label was founded in 1995, and is run by Vincent Patty. After some commercial success (with rap acts such as De Jeugd van Tegenwoordig, The Opposites, Def Rhymz, Postmen, and Extince) it became allied with Virgin EMI Records, and since 2004 has a marketing and distribution deal with PIAS Entertainment Group. It has expanded into Dutch-language music by singer-songwriters such as Lucky Fonz III, and in 2009 signed a distribution and marketing agreement with Universal Music Group. Still praised in 2009 as "the brand for high-quality Dutch hip-hop", it sought to expand into other musical genres.

== History ==
Founder Kees de Koning is a former music journalist and manager of Anouk. He is credited with "putting Dutch hip-hop on the map" with TopNotch, signing acts such as De Jeugd van Tegenwoordig, Extince, and The Opposites. Initially the label, which released music that didn't automatically receive radio play, used platforms such as YouTube (Note: De Koning commented in 2009 on reports that Universal Music Group made $100 million from YouTube videos, and said that YouTube was good for promoting artists but was not itself a "goldmine" for record companies. He could not say how much his label made from YouTube since Universal did the label's video distribution.) and Hyves to get attention for its artists, and added Instagram and Vine. TopNotch also collaborates in marketing with companies such as the brewery Bavaria and insurance company Centraal Beheer; for the latter, it made a video featuring Anouk, watched over 2 million times by August 2013. After achieving commercial success with Def Rhymz, Postmen, and Extince, the label acquired a reputation such that Virgin EMI Records hired de Koning as A&R and label manager in 2000. Success with Raymzter and Opgezwolle notwithstanding, de Koning's contract was not renewed after four years, and the label was in danger of folding. In 2004, PIAS Entertainment Group signed a distribution and marketing deal with TopNotch, saving the label. The first releases after the restructuring were by VSOP, Duvel Duvel, and Kubus. In 2009, the label make a distribution and marketing agreement with Universal Music Group (owners of Virgin EMI) and signed a non-hip-hop act, gabber punk band Aux Raus.

Their fifteenth anniversary, in 2010, was celebrated with a two-day festival in the Melkweg. That same year the label signed Lucky Fonz III, a Dutch-language singer, in a more comprehensive effort to expand beyond hip-hop which also included signing Surinamese singer Damaru; de Koning had personally pursued the artist, whose monthly performances in the TV show De Wereld Draait Door he admired. Their biggest commercial success to date is Gers Pardoel, whose "Ik neem je mee" is referred to as the most successful Dutch song ever; the song's video had 15 million views by 15 August 2013, a Dutch record.

De Koning started another company in 2006, Good Life, with Jerry Leembruggen and Ruben Fernhout (founders of The Partysquad and owners of the production company F & L Entertainment). Good Life aimed to produce more pop-oriented, rhythm and blues artists (such as Wudstik) through record deals and events.

== Artists ==
=== Current artists ===
- Appa
- Adje
- Cho
- Damaru
- Extince
- Gers Pardoel
- Jack Parow
- Lange Frans
- Lefties Soul Connection
- Lil' Kleine
- Lucky Fonz III
- The Opposites
- Salah Edin
- Typhoon
- U-Niq
- Tourist LeMC

=== Artists produced together with Magnetron Music ===
- De Jeugd van Tegenwoordig

=== Former artists ===
- Ronnie Flex
- Bilal Wahib
- Cilvaringz
- Def Rhymz
- K-Liber
- Kempi
- Opgezwolle
- Postmen
- Raymzter
- Robert Lee
- Joost Klein
