= List of Dutch Top 40 number-one singles of 1995 =

These hits topped the Dutch Top 40 in 1995 (see 1995 in music).

Issue Date	Artist	Song
7 January	Hermes House Band	I Will Survive
14 January	Hermes House Band	I Will Survive
21 January	Marco Borsato	Waarom nou jij
28 January	Irene Moors & de Smurfen	No Limit
4 February	Irene Moors & de Smurfen	No Limit
11 February	Irene Moors & de Smurfen	No Limit
18 February	Irene Moors & de Smurfen	No Limit
25 February	Irene Moors & de Smurfen	No Limit
4 March	Irene Moors & de Smurfen	No Limit
11 March	Gompie	Alice, Who the X Is Alice
18 March	Gompie	Alice, Who the X Is Alice
25 March	Gompie	Alice, Who the X Is Alice
1 April	Gompie	Alice, Who the X Is Alice
8 April	Gompie	Alice, Who the X Is Alice
15 April	Céline Dion	Think Twice
22 April	Céline Dion	Think Twice
29 April	Céline Dion	Think Twice
6 may	Vangelis	Conquest of Paradise
13 may	Vangelis	Conquest of Paradise
20 may	Vangelis	Conquest of Paradise
27 may	Vangelis	Conquest of Paradise
3 June	Vangelis	Conquest of Paradise
10 June	Vangelis	Conquest of Paradise
17 June	Vangelis	Conquest of Paradise
24 June	Vangelis	Conquest of Paradise
1 July	Vangelis	Conquest of Paradise
8 July	Vangelis	Conquest of Paradise
15 July	Technohead	I Wanna Be A Hippy
22 July	Technohead	I Wanna Be A Hippy
29 July	Technohead	I Wanna Be A Hippy
5 August	Clouseau	Passie
12 August	Guus Meeuwis & Vagant	Het is een nacht... (Levensecht)
19 August	Guus Meeuwis & Vagant	Het is een nacht... (Levensecht)
26 August	Guus Meeuwis & Vagant	Het is een nacht... (Levensecht)
2 September	Guus Meeuwis & Vagant	Het is een nacht... (Levensecht)
9 September	Guus Meeuwis & Vagant	Het is een nacht... (Levensecht)
16 September	Guus Meeuwis & Vagant	Het is een nacht... (Levensecht)
23 September	Höllenboer	Het busje komt zo
30 September	Höllenboer	Het busje komt zo
7 October	Höllenboer	Het busje komt zo
14 October	Höllenboer	Het busje komt zo
21 October	Höllenboer	Het busje komt zo
28 October	Guus Meeuwis & Vagant	Het is een nacht... (Levensecht)
4 November	Coolio feat. L.V.	Gangsta's Paradise
11 November	Coolio feat. L.V.	Gangsta's Paradise
18 November	Coolio feat. L.V.	Gangsta's Paradise
25 November	Coolio feat. L.V.	Gangsta's Paradise
2 December	Coolio feat. L.V.	Gangsta's Paradise
9 December	Linda, Roos & Jessica	Ademnood
16 December	Linda, Roos & Jessica	Ademnood
23 December	Linda, Roos & Jessica	Ademnood
30 December	Linda, Roos & Jessica	Ademnood

== See also ==
- 1995 in music
