= Ultratop 50 number-one hits of 1995 =

These hits topped the Ultratop 50 started the official charts.

Issue Date	Artist	Song
January 7	Marco Borsato	"Dromen zijn bedrog"
January 14	The Cranberries	"Zombie"
January 21	The Cranberries	"Zombie"
January 28	The Cranberries	"Zombie"
February 4	The Cranberries	"Zombie"
February 11	The Cranberries	"Zombie"
February 18	Edwyn Collins	"A Girl Like You"
February 25	Edwyn Collins	"A Girl Like You"
March 4	Edwyn Collins	"A Girl Like You"
March 11	Edwyn Collins	"A Girl Like You"
March 18	Edwyn Collins	"A Girl Like You"
March 25	Boyzone	"Love Me for a Reason"
April 1	Kamiel Spiessens	"Het isj nie moeilijk, het isj gemakkelijk"
April 8	Gompie	"Alice, Who the Fuck Is Alice?"
April 15	Gompie	"Alice, Who the Fuck Is Alice?"
April 22	Gompie	"Alice, Who the Fuck Is Alice?"
April 29	Gompie	"Alice, Who the Fuck Is Alice?"
May 6	Céline Dion	"Think Twice"
May 13	Céline Dion	"Think Twice"
May 20	Scatman John	"Scatman (Ski Ba Bop Ba Dop Bop)"
May 27	Scatman John	"Scatman (Ski Ba Bop Ba Dop Bop)"
June 3	Céline Dion	"Think Twice"
June 10	Céline Dion	"Think Twice"
June 17	Céline Dion	"Think Twice"
June 24	Vangelis	"Conquest of Paradise"
July 1	Vangelis	"Conquest of Paradise"
July 8	Vangelis	"Conquest of Paradise"
July 15	Vangelis	"Conquest of Paradise"
July 22	Vangelis	"Conquest of Paradise"
July 29	Vangelis	"Conquest of Paradise"
August 5	Vangelis	"Conquest of Paradise"
August 12	Vangelis	"Conquest of Paradise"
August 19	Scatman John	"Scatman's World"
August 26	Scatman John	"Scatman's World"
September 2	Scatman John	"Scatman's World"
September 9	Scatman John	"Scatman's World"
September 16	Scatman John	"Scatman's World"
September 23	Scatman John	"Scatman's World"
September 30	Technohead	"I Wanna Be a Hippy"
October 7	Guus Meeuwis & Vagant	"Het is een Nacht... (Levensecht)"
October 14	Guus Meeuwis & Vagant	"Het is een Nacht... (Levensecht)"
October 21	Guus Meeuwis & Vagant	"Het is een Nacht... (Levensecht)"
October 28	Guus Meeuwis & Vagant	"Het is een Nacht... (Levensecht)"
November 4	Guus Meeuwis & Vagant	"Het is een Nacht... (Levensecht)"
November 11	Guus Meeuwis & Vagant	"Het is een Nacht... (Levensecht)"
November 18	Guus Meeuwis & Vagant	"Het is een Nacht... (Levensecht)"
November 25	Guus Meeuwis & Vagant	"Het is een Nacht... (Levensecht)"
December 2	Coolio & LV	"Gangsta's Paradise"
December 9	Jimmy B	"Ik ben een vent"
December 16	Coolio & LV	"Gangsta's Paradise"
December 23	Coolio & LV	"Gangsta's Paradise"
December 30	Coolio & LV	"Gangsta's Paradise"

== See also ==
- 1995 in music
