= Kraantje Pappie =

Dutch rapper (born 1986)

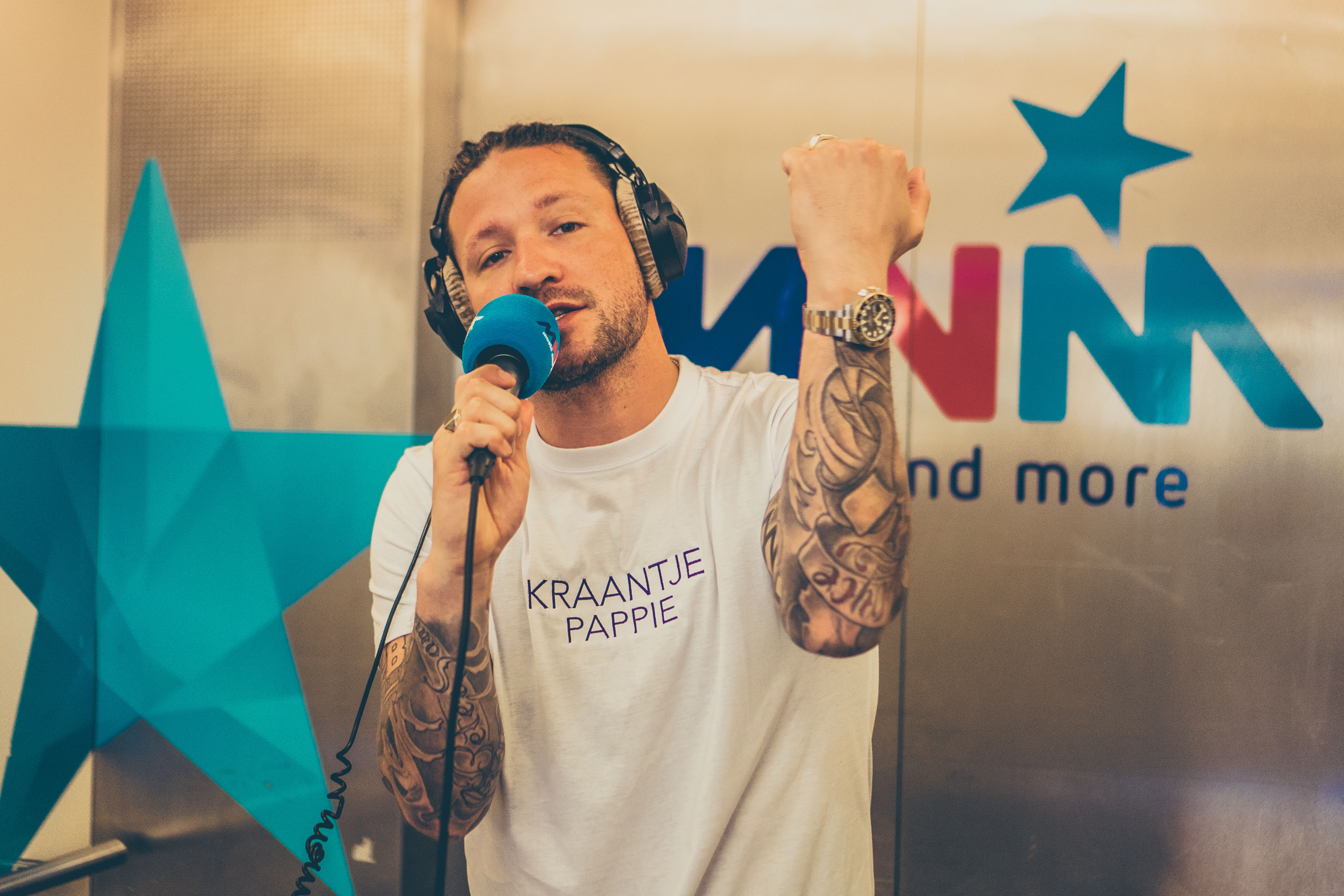
- Kraantje Pappie during a performance at MNM

Background information
- Born: Alex van der Zouwen; July 1, 1986 (age 40); Rozenburg, Netherlands
- Genre: Hip hop
- Occupations: Rapper; presenter; singer
- Instrument: Vocals
- Years active: 2007–present
- Label: Noah's Ark
- Website: https://www.kraantjepappie.nl/

Alex van der Zouwen (Dutch pronunciation: [ˈaːlɛks fɑn dər ˈzʌuə(n)]; born 1 July 1986), better known by his stage name Kraantje Pappie (pronounced [ˈkraːɲtɕə ˈpɑpi]; lit. 'Lil' Crane Daddy'), is a Dutch rapper and television presenter. Van der Zouwen is signed to the label Noah's Ark, which released four major albums alongside several singles.

== Early and personal life ==
Van der Zouwen is a Dutch/Moluccan rapper, who grew up in Rozenburg near Rotterdam and followed an education in Zuidlaren and Groningen. He lived in Haarlem for a while because of his successful judo career. In 2016, van der Zouwen participated in the 17th season of the reality show, Expeditie Robinson. He left after feeling homesick and not having finished his album Crane III. On 10 February 2021, Van der Zouwen became a father to his daughter Maeve Celine van der Zouwen.

=== Music ===
The name Kraantje Pappie comes from a website that generates Native American names. The name for Van der Zouwen was Kraantje Pappie. In 2007 he started gaining more recognition from the hiphop-community by releasing mixtapes and performing. In 2007, Van der Zouwen, won the Before the Fame Awards hosted in Groningen which started his career as a rapper. He made his breakthrough in 2012 with his debutalbum Crane. The album distinguished itself by using Van der Zouwen's rhyming technique in combination with dubstep- and grimeproductions. The album was produced by a group called Noisia.

In the beginning of May 2015 Van der Zouwen released three new albums, of which one he send to a fan whose address he knew. It is a trilogy, called Guardians van the Real Shit. On these three albums there are a total 39 tracks and collaborations with different artists, such as Jan Smit, Dope D.O.D, Jiggy Djé and Boef en de Gelogeerde Aap. These albums were also free to download for a week.

Van der Zouwen released in 2012 and 2014 the first two parts of the trilogy Crane. On October 28, 2016, he released the third part of the trilogy, which in September 2017 won him a gold record. Van der Zouwen also received golden record for, among others the singles Waar is Kraan?, Feesttent, Handen omhoog and De manier. In 2017 he scored a massive hit in Flanders with the single Pompen.

On September 28, 2018, the album Daddy was released, of which the single Lil Craney was rewarded with a platinum record for selling more than 160,000 records. The single Liefde in de lucht (in collaboration with Chef'Special-singer Joshua Nolet) also grew out to be a top 10 hit.

Van der Zouwen as of March 2021 part of a group of musicians named The Streamers, who gave free livestream-concerts during the COVID-19 pandemic. After the corona measures where loosened, the group announced to perform in concerts with an audience.

=== Television ===
In 2013 Van der Zouwen made his debut as television presenter and presented with Geraldine Kemper the second season of the show 101Barz The Next MC. Afterwards he continued with being a presenter with the television network BNN. He was part of a group of presenters from the NPO 3-program, De Social Club. He also used his stage name Kraantje Pappie as presenter.

=== Film ===
He plays a role in the 2023 film Juf Braaksel en de magische ring directed by Aram van de Rest.

== Discography ==
=== Albums ===
List of albums
Title	Year	Peak chart positions		Certification
Title	Year	NLD	BEL (FL)	Certification
Crane	2012	8	73	
Crane II	2014	13	62	
Crane III	2016	22	57	
Daddy	2018	2	59	NVPI: Gold
Crane I–IV	2025	9	—	
Crane IV	2025	99	—	

=== Singles ===
List of singles
Title	Year	Peak chart positions		
Title	Year	NLD 40	NLD 100	BEL (FL)
"Waar is Kraan?"	2012	21	24	16
"Wat nou als het lukt"	2012	—	92	—
"Alles gaat voorbij" (with Doe Maar and Postmen)	2012	34	21	—
"Weekend" (with FeestDJRuud, Dirtcaps and Sjaak)	2013	tip11	69	—
"Met z'n tweeën"	2013	tip4	57	tip8
"Feesttent" (featuring MC Jiggy Dje)	2014	tip2	50	—
"Handen omhoog" (with Jan Smit)	2014	26	1	—
"De hele nacht door" (with StukTV and Cazz Major)	2015	tip13	—	—
"De manier" (featuring Bizzey)	2016	tip7	22	37
"Pompen"	2017	—	81	6
"Traag" (with Bizzey and Jozo)	2017	tip8	22	tip27
"Ja!" (with Bizzey, Chivv and Yung Felix)	2018	5	1	tip2
"Lil Craney"	2018	5	2	tip1
"Allez" (with Diggy Dex)	2018	tip12	—	—
"Liefde in de lucht" (featuring Joshua Nolet)	2018	5	6	tip12
"Ik heb je nodig" (featuring Bizzey and Jonna Fraser)	2018	20	11	—
"Bitch Move" (featuring Josylvio)	2018	—	76	—
"Sigaret"	2018	tip13	—	—
"Drup" (with Bizzey, Jonna Fraser and Ramiks)	2019	9	2	tip33
"Fuego" (with Bizzey and Rockywhereyoubeen)	2019	—	68	—
"Last Man Standing" (with Bizzey, Chivv and Yung Felix)	2019	tip5	7	—
"Moment" (with Kris Kross Amsterdam and Tabitha)	2019	3	5	—
"Vallende ster"	2019	38	—	—
"Getaway"	2019	tip20	—	tip31
"Nacht" (with Guus Meeuwis)	2020	25	17	—
"Rode wijn" (with Maan)	2020	23	28	—
"Hoe het loopt" (with Paul Sinha)	2020	tip21	—	—
"Ma aan de lijn"	2021	tip14	—	—
"Tranen" (with Kris Kross Amsterdam and Pommelien Thijs)	2021	tip6	73	14
"1%" (with Bilal Wahib)	2021	—	52	—
"Hockeymeisjes" (with Bizzey and Immo)	2022	tip26	67	—
"Missen zou" (with Thomas Acda and Rolf Sanchez)	2022	27	67	—
"Lang leve the Life"	2022	tip10	78	—
"Lil Freakje" (featuring ADF Samski)	2025	33	25	—
"Spijt komt later" (with Isabèl Usher)	2026	4	2	—
