= Strings 'n' Stripes =

Studio album by The Baseballs
- Released: 15 April 2011
- Genre: Rock and roll; rockabilly
- Label: Warner Music Group

The Baseballs chronology
Strike! (2009)	Strings 'n' Stripes (2011)	Strings 'n' Stripes Live (2012)

Singles from Strings 'n' Stripes
- 1. "Candy Shop" Released: 8 July 2011; 2. "Hello" Released: 8 April 2011; 3. "This is a Night (Het is een Nacht)" Released: 23 May 2011

Strings 'n' Stripes is the second album released by The Baseballs, a German rock 'n' roll cover band, in 2011. The album was released in April 2011.

== Track listing ==
No.	Title	Writer(s)	Length
1.	"Intro" (featuring Scott Mills)		0:27
2.	"Candy Shop"	(50 Cent cover)	3:45
3.	"I'm Not a Girl, Not Yet a Woman"	(Britney Spears cover)	2:52
4.	"Hello"	(Martin Solveig cover)	2:49
5.	"Quit Playing Games (With My Heart)"	(Backstreet Boys cover)	2:49
6.	"Paparazzi"	(Lady Gaga cover)	2:45
7.	"Bitch"	(Meredith Brooks cover)	3:35
8.	"Ghetto Superstar"	(Pras Michel cover)	2:56
9.	"California Gurls"	(Katy Perry cover)	4:12
10.	"Hard Not to Cry"		3:01
11.	"Coming Home"	(Diddy - Dirty Money cover)	3:07
12.	"Tik Tok"	(Ke$ha cover)	3:40
13.	"Follow Me"	(Uncle Kracker cover)	2:52
14.	"Miami"	(Will Smith cover)	3:44

Dutch edition
No.	Title	Writer(s)	Length
15.	"This is a Night (Het is een Nacht)" (featuring Guus Meeuwis)	(Guus Meeuwis cover)	3:07

Deluxe edition
No.	Title	Writer(s)	Length
15.	"When Love Takes Over" (Live)	(David Guetta and Kelly Rowland cover)	3:58
16.	"She Hates Me" (Live)	(Puddle of Mudd cover)	4:04
17.	"Torn" (Live)	(Ednaswap cover)	4:14
18.	"Let Me Love You" (Live)	(Mario cover)	7:10
19.	"I'm Yours" (Live)	(Jason Mraz cover)	5:46

Dutch deluxe edition
No.	Title	Writer(s)	Length
15.	"When Love Takes Over" (Live)	(David Guetta and Kelly Rowland cover)	3:58
16.	"She Hates Me" (Live)	(Puddle of Mudd cover)	4:04
17.	"Torn" (Live)	(Ednaswap cover)	4:14
18.	"Let Me Love You" (Live)	(Mario cover)	7:10
19.	"I'm Yours" (Live)	(Jason Mraz cover)	5:46
20.	"This is a Night (Het is een Nacht)" (featuring Guus Meeuwis)	(Guus Meeuwis cover)	3:07

== Chart performance ==
=== Weekly charts ===
Chart (2011)	Peak position
Austrian Albums (Ö3 Austria)	3
Belgian Albums (Ultratop Flanders)	10
Finnish Albums (Suomen virallinen lista)	2
Dutch Albums (Album Top 100)	4
German Albums (Offizielle Top 100)	5
Spanish Albums (PROMUSICAE)	29
Swedish Albums (Sverigetopplistan)	4
Swiss Albums (Schweizer Hitparade)	1
UK Albums (OCC)	74

=== Year-end charts ===
Chart (2011)	Position
Dutch Albums (Album Top 100)	47
German Albums (Offizielle Top 100)	73
Swedish Albums (Sverigetopplistan)	76
Swiss Albums (Schweizer Hitparade)	21
