= Umbrella (song) =

2007 single by Rihanna featuring Jay-Z

Single by Rihanna featuring Jay-Z

from the album Good Girl Gone Bad
- Released: March 29, 2007
- Recorded: 2007
- Studio: Westlake, Los Angeles
- Genre: Pop; hip-hop; R&B
- Length: 4:36 (album version); 4:17 (radio edit)
- Label: Def Jam; SRP
- Songwriters: Christopher Stewart; Kuk Harrell; Terius Nash; Shawn Carter
- Producer: Tricky Stewart

Rihanna singles chronology
"Roll It" (2007)	"Umbrella" (2007)	"Shut Up and Drive" (2007)

Jay-Z singles chronology
"Hollywood" (2007)	"Umbrella" (2007)	"Blue Magic" (2007)

Music video
- "Umbrella (Orange Version)" on YouTube

"Umbrella" is a song by Barbadian singer Rihanna, released worldwide on March 29, 2007, by Def Jam Recordings, as the lead single and opening track from her third studio album, Good Girl Gone Bad (2007). It features a guest performance from the singer's mentor and Def Jam-label boss Jay-Z, who co-wrote the song alongside American singer the-Dream. Its producers, Tricky Stewart and Kuk Harrell, also received songwriting credits.

"Umbrella" was met with universal acclaim upon release and was a global commercial success, topping the charts in 19 countries such as Australia, Canada, Germany, Spain, the Republic of Ireland, Sweden, Switzerland, the United Kingdom, and the United States. In the UK, where the song's chart performance coincided with prolonged rain and flooding, it was one of the most played songs on radio in the 2000s. It managed to remain atop the UK Singles Chart for 10 consecutive weeks, the longest run at number one for any single of that decade, and is also one of the few songs to top the chart for at least 10 weeks. As one of the highest digital debuts in the United States at the time, it remained atop of the U.S. Billboard Hot 100 for seven consecutive weeks.

The single's accompanying music video, directed by Chris Applebaum and featuring Rihanna's nude body covered in silver paint, earned her a Video of the Year at the 2007 MTV Video Music Awards and Most Watched Video on MuchMusic.com at MuchMusic Video Awards. "Umbrella" has been covered by several notable performers across various musical genres, including All Time Low, the Baseballs, Train, Manic Street Preachers, McFly, Mike Shinoda of Linkin Park, OneRepublic, Taylor Swift, and Vanilla Sky. Rihanna performed the song at the 2007 MTV Movie Awards and at the 2008 BRIT Awards, and also included it as the closing number of the Good Girl Gone Bad Tour (2008), the Last Girl on Earth (2010), and the Loud Tour (2011) as well as in the Diamonds World Tour (2013), and the Anti World Tour (2016). In 2021, Rolling Stone ranked "Umbrella" #332 on their revised list of the 500 Greatest Songs of All Time.

== Background and development ==
American songwriter and producer Christopher "Tricky" Stewart convened with Terius "The-Dream" Nash and Kuk Harrell in January 2007 at the Atlanta-based Triangle Studios to create new material. In the studio, Stewart was "messing around with a walloping hi-hat sound", which he found in GarageBand. With his attention caught by the sound, Nash asked Stewart what he was doing: "Oh, my Gosh, what is that beat?". When Stewart incorporated chords onto the hi-hat, "immediately the word popped into [Nash's] head"; he went to the vocal booth and started singing. Nash wrote the first two verses and the chorus over Stewart's skeleton track. They quickly wrote the lyrics, completing the first verse in 60 seconds. They continued into writing, adding the hook while "[Stewart] would put the next chord". In a matter of hours, they had recorded a demo of the track. The song was written with American pop singer Britney Spears in mind, whom Stewart had previously worked with on her 2003 single "Me Against the Music". Stewart and Nash thought that Spears, who had "her personal life ... a little out of control" at the time, needed a hit as a musical comeback. Spears was working on her fifth album, Blackout, so they sent a copy of the demo to Spears' management. However, Spears did not hear of the song because her label at the time, Jive rejected it, claiming they had enough songs for her to record.

Following the management's rejection of the track, Stewart and Nash dealt it out to other record labels. It was also given to British singer-songwriter Taio Cruz, who failed to convince his record company Mercury to release it. It was then opted by Island Def Jam chairman Antonio "L.A." Reid, a friend of Stewart who established his first studio. By early February 2007, the demo was sent to Reid's right-hand woman, A&R executive Karen Kwak, who passed it along to Reid with a message confirming that they had found a song suited for Rihanna, who was working on her third studio album, Good Girl Gone Bad, at the time. Reid immediately sent the demo to Rihanna, who was also positive towards it: "When the demo first started playing, I was like, This is interesting, this is weird. ... But the song kept getting better. I listened to it over and over. I said, 'I need this record. I want to record it tomorrow."

However, since it was the Grammy season of 2007, Stewart and Nash eyed American R&B singer Mary J. Blige for the demo. Upon calling them to set the record aside for Rihanna, Stewart had played it to an associate of Blige, subsequently promising the song to her. Having heard the move of the writers, Kwak and A&R Angel Maldonado began calling Stewart and his manager, Mark Stewart, incessantly. Meanwhile, considering Blige's nominations at the Grammys, Stewart and Nash agreed to wait for her response. However, Blige failed to hear the song in full due to her obligations to the Grammys at the time and "had to sign off on the record before her reps could accept it". Finally, Reid "stepped in, trading on his power-broker status and longstanding relationship with Stewart", and admits, "I made the producers an offer they couldn't refuse." By the time Reid had successfully persuaded Stewart's camp, they "just couldn't say no". On giving up the record to Reid's camp, Mark Stewart comments, "We knew Rihanna's album would be out in a few months. Mary wasn't even in an album cycle yet. We made the sensible business decision."

== Recording and composition ==
When [Rihanna] recorded the 'ellas,' you knew it was about to be the jump-off and your life was about to change if you had anything to do with that record.

— Tricky Stewart, MTV News

Rihanna recorded "Umbrella", with vocal production by Thaddis "Kuk" Harrell, at Westlake Recording Studios in Los Angeles. Initially, Stewart admitted he was still reluctant as to whether Rihanna was the right artist to record the song, but following the recording of the "ella, ella" catch phrase, he felt they were onto "something". Following Rihanna's recording, Def Jam CEO-rapper Jay-Z added his rap. However, Jay-Z rewrote his verse without the awareness of Stewart and Nash. Stewart could not understand it, but later realized it "made sense" instead of the first version. Stewart noted that "from a songwriter's standpoint, he just really made it more about the song, with the metaphors about umbrellas and about the weather versus what he had before".

"Umbrella" is a pop, hip-hop and R&B song with rock influences. The song's musicscape is based on the hi-hat, synthesizers, and a distorted bassline. According to Entertainment Weekly magazine, the song's beat can be recreated through a drum loop from the Apple music-software program GarageBand (Vintage Funk Kit 03). The sheet music for "Umbrella" shows the key of B♭ minor (G♭ major for the bridge), with a tempo of 87 beats per minute. The song's lyrics are written in the traditional verse-chorus form. They open with a rap verse, and the hook "ella, ella" follows every chorus. A bridge follows the second hook, and the song ends in a fadeout.

== Release and reception ==
"Umbrella" was released worldwide on March 29, 2007, debuting on Rihanna's Def Jam website. It received airplay across mainstream, rhythmic and urban radios in the US the same day. The song was released digitally in the United Kingdom on May 14, 2007, along with its physical release following two weeks later.

"Umbrella" received universal critical acclaim. Andy Kellman of AllMusic commented: "'Umbrella' is [Rihanna's best song] to date, delivering mammoth if spacious drums, a towering backdrop during the chorus, and vocals that are somehow totally convincing without sounding all that impassioned – an ideal spot between trying too hard and boredom, like she might've been on her 20th take." Alex Macpherson of British newspaper The Guardian, "Umbrella" is "evidence" that Rihanna's "strict work ethic is paying off", adding that she "delivers [in the song] an impassioned declaration of us-against-the-world devotion". Tom Breihan of Pitchfork, though he complimented the production, dismissed Rihanna's voice which "takes on an unpleasant icepick edge when she tries to fill the space between the slow-tempo beats", adding that the song is "uncompelling as event-pop, particularly because of the disconnect between Rihanna's cold, clinical delivery and the comforting warmth of the lyrics". In comparison, Breihan's retrospective review on Stereogum acclaimed "Umbrella". Especially reflecting on his contemporary, more critical Pitchfork review, he admitted that her vocal performance was moreso that of "self-assured power" than "[disconnection] from a song that’s all about visceral connection"; however, he expressed criticism towards Jay-Z's guest verse for sounding uncommitted and adding "nothing" to the song besides "branding".

Sal Cinquemani from Slant Magazine wrote "That the song is just plain good, regardless of genre, proves that Jay and Rihanna, who's already scored hits across several formats with a string of singles that couldn't be more different from each other, are dedicated to producing quality hits—however frivolous they may be." Quentin B. Huff of PopMatters said that ""Umbrella" is a monster, so much so that I'll even confess to spending a portion of a rainy afternoon practicing the hook." Jonah Weiner of Blender magazine called the song the album's highlight and stated that it "would be far less engrossing if it wasn't for the way Rihanna disassembles its ungainly title into 11 hypnotic, tongue-flicking syllables". The New York Times' Kelefa Sanneh described the song as "a space-age hip-pop song". Gabe Saporta of Cobra Starship noted in an interview on MTV's Total Request Live that the song's hook can be misheard as a reference to girl power: "I love that song but when I first heard it I thought she was saying 'My Beretta,' you know, like a gun? And I'm like whoa, that's a little edgy."

Entertainment Weekly ranked the song number one on the 10 Best Singles of 2007, while Rolling Stone and Time listed the song at number three on the 100 Best Songs of 2007.

== Chart performance ==
=== Oceania ===
"Umbrella" entered the Australian Singles Chart at number one on June 10, 2007, becoming Rihanna's second number one in the country following "SOS" (2006). It spent six consecutive weeks at the top, and has since earned a 5× Platinum certification by the Australian Recording Industry Association, denoting sales of 350,000 copies. It spent a total of 32 weeks on the chart, ending the year as the country's third best-selling single of 2007. "Umbrella" debuted on the New Zealand Singles Chart at number 34 on May 14, 2007. Over the following two weeks, it dropped one place, then climbed to a new peak of number 33. In its fourth week on the chart, it leaped to the top of the chart, becoming Rihanna's second number one single following "Pon de Replay" (2005). It remained atop the chart for six consecutive weeks and on the chart for a total of 24 weeks. The song received a Platinum certification from the Recording Industry Association of New Zealand, denoting sales of 15,000 copies, subsequently becoming the country's best-selling single of 2007.

=== North America ===
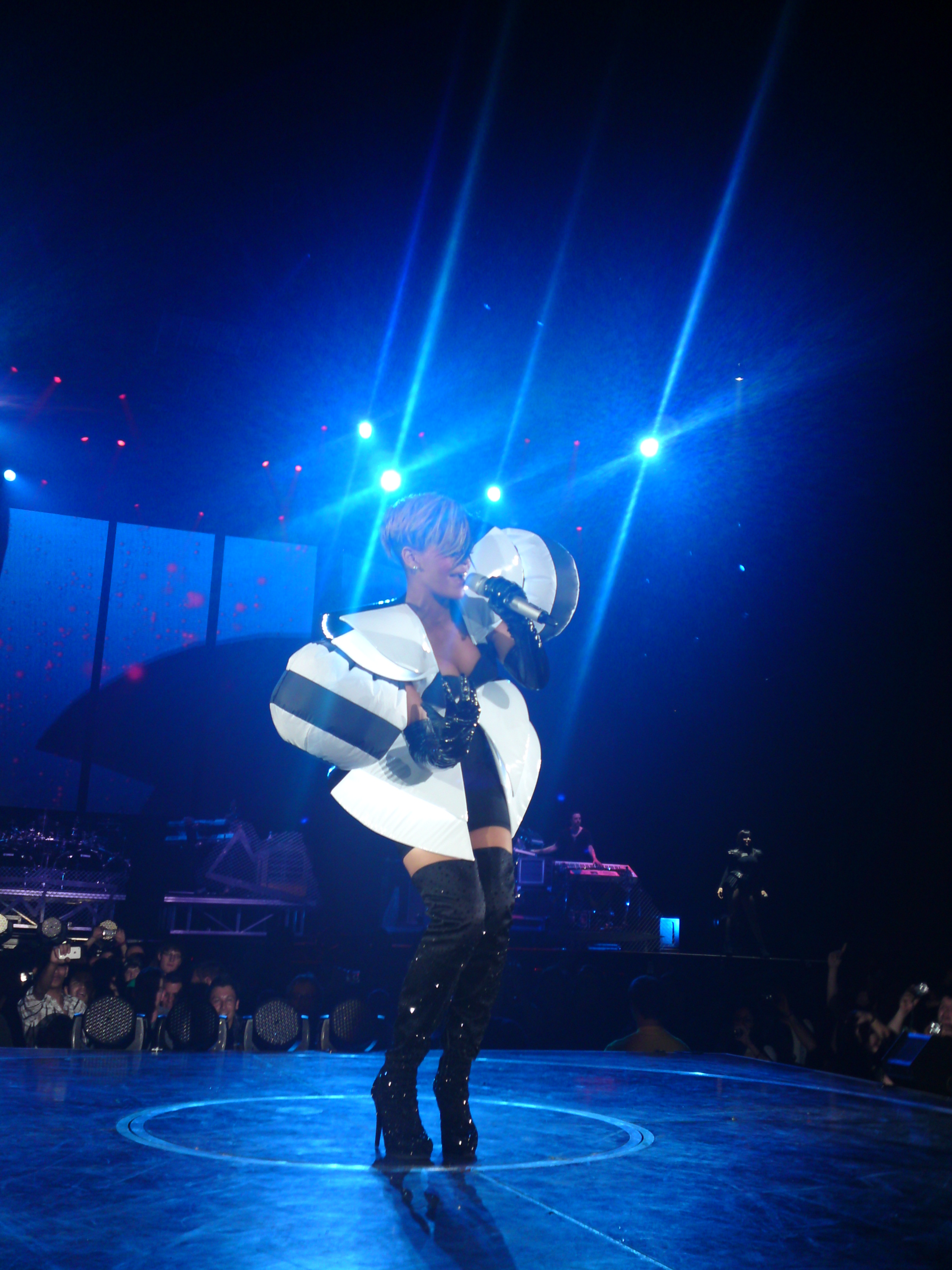
Rihanna performing "Umbrella" in Zurich at her tour Last Girl on Earth, 2010

"Umbrella" debuted on the US Billboard Hot 100 on the chart issue dated April 28, 2007, at number 91. The following week it climbed to number 72, and to number 63 in its third week. In its fourth, fifth and sixth week on the chart, it progressively ascended to numbers 52, 44 and 41. Prior to its physical release, "Umbrella" achieved the biggest debut in the six-year history of iTunes in the United States, breaking a record previously held by Shakira and Wyclef Jean's "Hips Don't Lie". Following its digital release, "Umbrella" soared to number one for the issue dated June 9, 2007, on its seventh week on the chart. It subsequently debuted atop the Hot Digital Songs chart, with first-week sales of over 277,000 units. The single became the highest digital debut in the United States since Nielsen SoundScan began tracking downloads in 2003, surpassing Justin Timberlake's "SexyBack" 250,000 sales record in 2006. The single's rise to the top of the Hot 100 marked Rihanna's second number one single following "SOS" (2006), which was also noted for its huge leap on the Hot 100 to the top spot based on digital sales alone. Significantly sustained by the strong airplay of the single and preventing American rap group Shop Boyz' "Party Like a Rockstar" from advancing on the chart, "Umbrella" spent seven consecutive weeks at the top of the chart. "Umbrella" eventually became the second best-performing single of 2007 on the Hot 100, only behind Beyoncé's hit single "Irreplaceable" which topped the chart for ten weeks total.

"Umbrella" entered the top fifty of the US Radio Songs chart on the issue dated April 28, 2007, at number 42. The following week it climbed to number 29, and reached the top twenty in its fourth week on the chart, at number 17. It entered the top five of the chart on the chart issue of June 2, 2007, at number three. It eventually reached number one on the issue dated July 14, 2007, and remained at the top for four consecutive weeks. On the Pop Songs chart, "Umbrella" debuted at number 77 on the chart issue dated April 28, 2007. The following week it rose to number 61, and to 51 in its third week. In its fourth week on the chart, it climbed to number 36. On the chart issue of June 9, 2007, "Umbrella" soared from number 31 to number one in its eighth week on the chart. It spent six consecutive weeks at the top. "Umbrella" debuted at number 69 on the Hot R&B/Hip Hop Songs chart on the issue dated April 21, 2007. The following week it rose to number 52 and by the issue dated June 9, 2007, it had climbed into the top twenty at number 17. It reached the top ten for the chart issue of June 16, 2007, and rose to number six the following week, earning the 'Greatest Gainer' in both sales and airplay for the week. It made its peak of number four in the issue of July 14, 2007. "Umbrella" entered the Hot Dance Club Songs chart as the 'Hot Shot Debut' at number 36, for the issue dated June 9, 2007. The following week it leaped to number 25. It ascended into the top ten of the chart the week after, landing at number nine, and rose to number four in its fourth week on the chart. It topped the chart on the issue dated July 7, 2007 and remained at number one for a second week.

The song debuted at number one in Canada, becoming the first song to top the then recently launched Canadian Hot 100, a singles chart in Canada issued by Billboard magazine, similar to that of the Billboard Hot 100.

In February 2023, the song re-entered the US Billboard Hot 100 following Rihanna's performance at the halftime show of Super Bowl LVII, peaking at number 37.

=== Europe ===
The single experienced major success in Europe, most notably in the United Kingdom. The song entered the UK Singles Chart at number one based on digital sales alone, becoming Rihanna's first chart-topper in the country and Jay-Z's third. During the single's fourth week on the chart, Rihanna earned her first 'Chart Double' with both the single and subsequent album (Good Girl Gone Bad) topping the UK Singles and Albums charts simultaneously. Having reached nine straight weeks at number one on the chart, it broke the record of American group Gnarls Barkley's "Crazy" as the longest chart-topper of the decade. "Umbrella" eventually reached a total of ten weeks at number one on the chart, becoming the country's longest-running number one single of the 21st century and the longest-running number 1 male/female duet, until the record was broken by Sam Fender and Olivia Dean in 2026. In addition, Rihanna became the seventh artist in history to top the chart for ten consecutive weeks. By the end of 2008, "Umbrella" had sold over 600,000 copies, making it her biggest-selling single at the time, before being succeeded by "Love the Way You Lie", a collaboration with Eminem two years later in 2010. It became Britain's second biggest-selling single of 2007, only behind Leona Lewis' "Bleeding Love". On August 16, 2024, it was certified 4× Platinum by the British Phonographic Industry (BPI) for sales and streams of 2,400,000 units. In total, "Umbrella" has amassed 51 weeks in the official Charts, making it the joint 20th longest runner of all time. It has spent a further 20 weeks to tally 71 total weeks inside the Top 100, in which it has appeared in three consecutive years; number one in 2007, 18 in 2008 and number 99 in 2009.

"Umbrella" had similar success elsewhere in Europe, topping charts for lengthy periods including Switzerland for nine weeks, Norway for seven weeks, Germany for five weeks, Austria for four weeks and Belgium for three weeks. It also reached number one in Denmark and Hungary. In Spain, the song achieved an eight-times platinum certification from PROMUSICAE, denoting sales of over 160,000 units. Furthermore, "Umbrella" attained top five positions in the Czech Republic, Finland, Italy, the Netherlands and Sweden. It also reached the top ten of France.

Worldwide the song has sold more than 6.6 million copies, making it one of the best selling singles of all time.

== Music video ==
=== Background and concept ===
While working on the album, ideas began to circulate concerning Rihanna's image, extending into her music videos. She asked American music video director Chris Applebaum to send her "something" to work on. Def Jam representatives were expecting Applebaum of the treatment. In response, Applebaum hurriedly made a treatment for the video, one of his first ideas being the silver body paint that Rihanna is seen in. Applebaum was doubtful whether Rihanna would embrace the idea, but her "positive response" following a letter the director sent to the artist ensured its approval. Makeup artist Pamela Neal mixed a silver paint that would give Rihanna such a look. During the session, the paint was re-applied between takes to ensure she was completely covered. The set was closed to Rihanna, Applebaum and a camera assistant. Rihanna also contributed her own ideas towards the video shoot, suggesting to Applebaum that she dance en pointe, an idea which he accepted.

Visual effects at Kroma were supervised by Bert Yukich and produced by Amy Yukich. A key part of the video is a 24-second visual effects sequence in which Rihanna is surrounded by silvery strands of liquid that crisscross the frame in graceful arcs in response to her movements. Water elements were recorded on a special effects stage using a high-speed 35mm camera. Bert Yukich then composited them into the scene with the singer. He then added lighting effects to the practical water elements to give them the mirror-like texture of mercury.

=== Release ===
The music video premiered on April 26, 2007, on her website. Downloads were made available for those in the U.S. only from the website for a limited time. The video was officially released on the iTunes Store on May 11, 2007, peaking at number one for a period of eight weeks. On May 1, 2007, "Umbrella" debuted on MTV's TRL at number ten, before reaching number one on May 9 where it remained for fifteen days, making it the longest running number one of 2007. The video was well-played in MTV during the second half of 2007; it has reached over 8,000 plays, receiving a platinum recognition at the MTV Platinum and Gold Video Awards. Such was the success of the promotional video that it received five nominations at the 2007 MTV Video Music Awards, including Female Artist of the Year, Video of the Year and Monster Single of the Year, going on to win the latter two.

== Legacy ==
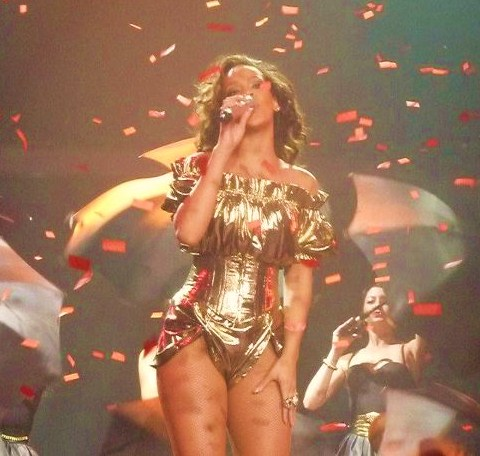
Rihanna performing "Umbrella" during the Loud Tour

"Umbrella" is widely acknowledged as the song that propelled Rihanna from rising pop act into superstardom and transformed her into a "fully fledged sex symbol" and a pop icon. It marked her switch from the "girl next door" persona of her first two albums to the "edgy, sexier" look of her subsequent albums. Some music journalists consider it to be her signature song. In his book The Song Machine: Inside the Hit Factory, John Seabrook wrote:

Two albums into her career, it still wasn't clear who Rihanna was. To her detractors, and there were many, she was just another wannabe-yoncé who sang through her nose and couldn't really dance. To prove them wrong, she needed a song that would define her as an artist....Eleven rhythmic syllables, "umbrella-ella-ella-eh-eh-eh," did what the two previous albums together had not done: they defined Rihanna as an artist...."Umbrella" marked the arrival of something new in pop: a digital icon. In the rock era, when the album was the standard unit of recorded music, listeners had ten or twelve songs to get to know the artist, but in the singles-oriented world of today, the artist has only three or four minutes to put their personality across, and at that Rihanna would prove to be without peer.

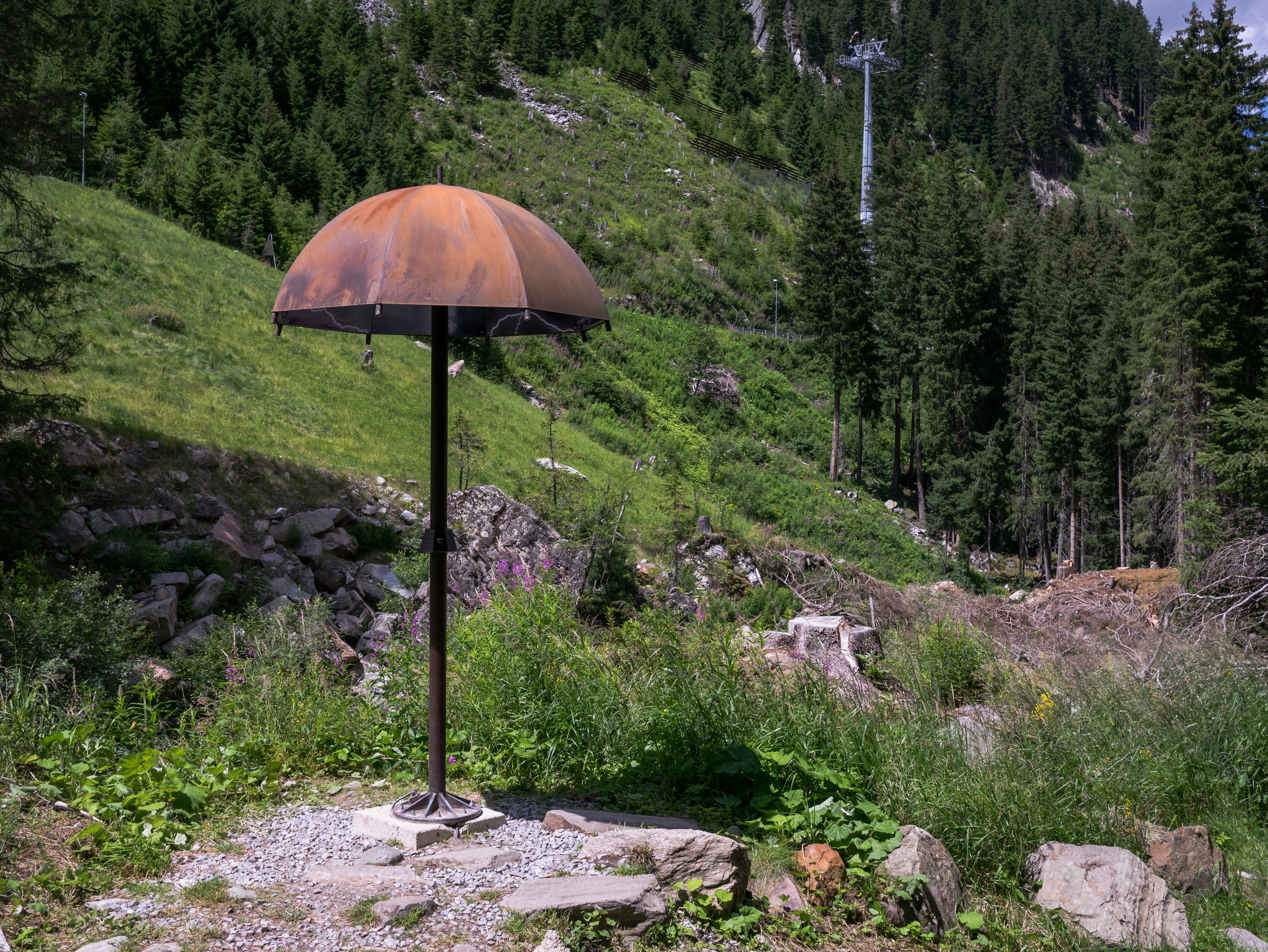
Rust sculpture for the song at the Ischgl Walk of Lyrics

Featured act Jay-Z said, "It shows such growth for her as an artist...If you listen to the lyrics to that song, you know the depth and how far she's come." The song's producer, Kuk Harrell, said, "We knew it was special....Nothing has been the same since we created that record. We had experience in record making but not hit making. All of a sudden you have major artists blowing up your phone. And we knew exactly how to service them; we reverted back to that jingle mentality — we were prepared for that pressure. So whether it was Beyoncé calling or Bieber calling, we knew how to operate....When she recorded the 'ellas', you knew your life was about to change." In January 2016, Billboard called "Umbrella" Rihanna's best song. In 2018, Rolling Stone called it her second-greatest song, behind 2011's "We Found Love" (featuring Calvin Harris), and said that it transformed Rihanna into a "full-fledged pop heavyweight". In the same year, The Guardian named "Umbrella" as the best song to spend over 10 weeks at number one in the UK, writing that "Rihanna's Umbrella is a genuinely exceptional pop song....it's perfect." Canadian duo Tegan and Sara stated that "Umbrella" inspired their 2013 single "I Was a Fool" from their album Heartthrob.

=== "Rihanna Curse" ===
"Umbrella"'s reign at number one in the United Kingdom occurred as the country was hit by the unseasonal extreme rainfall and flooding, which led the British national newspaper The Sun to humorously suggest the two events were related, with the media referring to it as the "Rihanna Curse." Rihanna herself commented on this saying that it "definitely helped the song stay [at No.1] for so long." A similar situation occurred in New Zealand, where the song hit number one in the early winter of 2007 as the country was experiencing some of the worst storms in its history. During the weather conditions, Taranaki, Tauranga, and Auckland had experienced tornadoes and flooding in the Far North of the country. Once the single was replaced on the top spot, weather conditions throughout New Zealand pacified, although Hawke's Bay was still stormy.

The same happened in Romania where "Umbrella" hit the stations in the nation during the summer. That summer was in its first half the hottest and driest period of time in Romania since 1946. As the song reached the top ten and then its number-one peak, the country experienced the worst storms and most pouring rains in its history. As the song was losing positions in the charts, the storm ended and the temperatures lowered step-by-step.

With the record-breaking success of the single and the reported coincidence with the weather, Def Jam's marketing team collaborated with British umbrella manufacturer Totes. The company produced five types of Rihanna umbrellas, one of which was a two-tone satin umbrella that Rihanna debuted in public during her performance of the song at the 2007 MTV Movie Awards.

== Live performances ==
"Umbrella" was performed by Rihanna during the 2007 MTV Movie Awards on June 3, 2007. In the United Kingdom, she performed the song on the ITV morning show GMTV and at the Brit Awards (alongside Klaxons) in 2008. She also performed "Umbrella" during her AOL sessions. In France, she performed it on Star Academy. "Umbrella" was added to the setlist of her first headlining Good Girl Gone Bad Tour where it was performed as the final song for the encore. It was also included as the closing act of the Last Girl on Earth tour and the Loud Tour. Rihanna performed "Umbrella" at Radio 1's Hackney Weekend on May 24, 2012, as the sixteenth song on the set list. The performance featured a giant sphinx on the stage. The song was also performed during the Diamonds World Tour and the Anti World Tour. On February 12, 2023, she performed the song as part of her set during the halftime show of Super Bowl LVII.

== Formats and track listings ==
=== Umbrella ===
- US promo only CD single
1. "Umbrella" featuring Jay-Z (Radio Edit) – 4:14
2. "Umbrella" (Seamus Haji and Paul Emanuel Radio Edit) – 4:00
- Australian, European CD single
1. "Umbrella" (Radio Edit) – 4:14
2. "Umbrella" (Seamus Haji and Paul Emanuel Radio Edit) – 3:59
- EU enhanced Maxi-CD single

GR enhanced CD single

1. "Umbrella" (Radio Edit) – 4:14
2. "Umbrella" (Seamus Haji and Paul Emanuel Remix) – 4:01
3. "Umbrella" (The Lindbergh Palace Remix) – 7:54
4. "Umbrella" (Video Enhancement)
- American 12" vinyl

Sides A & B

1. "Umbrella" (Radio Edit) – 4:14
2. "Umbrella" (Instrumental) – 4:37
- European 12" vinyl

Side A

1. "Umbrella" (Seamus Haji and Paul Emanuel Remix) – 4:01

Side B

1. "Umbrella" (Radio Edit) – 4:14
2. "Umbrella" (Instrumental) – 4:37

=== Umbrella: Remixes ===
- American, Brazilian promo CD single
1. "Umbrella" (Seamus Haji and Paul Emanuel Radio Edit) – 3:59
2. "Umbrella" (Jody den Broeder Lush Radio Edit) – 4:42
3. "Umbrella" (Jody den Broeder Destruction Radio Edit) – 4:25
4. "Umbrella" (The Lindbergh Palace Radio Edit) – 3:54
5. "Umbrella" (Seamus Haji and Paul Emanuel Club Mix) – 6:35
6. "Umbrella" (Jody den Broeder Lush Club Mix) – 9:11
7. "Umbrella" (Jody den Broeder Destruction Club Mix) – 7:57
8. "Umbrella" (The Lindbergh Palace Club Mix) – 7:54
9. "Umbrella" (The Lindbergh Palace Dub) – 6:46
- British promo CD single
1. "Umbrella" (Seamus Haji and Paul Emanuel Club Mix) – 6:35
2. "Umbrella" (Jody den Broeder Lush Club Mix) – 9:11
3. "Umbrella" (The Lindbergh Palace Club Mix) – 7:54
4. "Umbrella" (Jody den Broeder Destruction Club Mix) – 7:57
5. "Umbrella" (The Lindbergh Palace Dub) – 6:46
6. "Umbrella" (Seamus Haji and Paul Emanuel Radio Edit) – 3:59
7. "Umbrella" (The Lindbergh Palace Radio Edit) – 3:54

== Credits and personnel ==
Song credits

- "Tricky" Stewart ― produced
- The-Dream ― written
- Kuk Harrell ― vocal production
- Rihanna ― main vocals
- Jay-Z ― rap verse

Video credits

- Chris Applebaum ― direction
- John Hardin ― produced
- Pierre Rouger ― direction of photography
- Bert Yukich and Amy Yukich (KromA) ― visual effects
- Nabil Mechi ― editorial
- Isaac Heckert ― production assistant
- Reactor Films ― production co
- Mike Sarkissian ― rep

== Accolades ==
The song has earned Rihanna several awards and nominations. In 2007, the song won two awards out of three nominations at the MTV Video Music Awards. At the 50th Grammy Awards in 2008, "Umbrella" also earned Rihanna and Jay-Z a Grammy Award for Best Rap/Sung Collaboration in addition to receiving nominations for Record of the Year and Song of the Year. The song was listed at No. 412 on Rolling Stone's "The 500 Greatest Songs of All Time" in 2010 and at No. 333 in the 2021 update.

Year	Ceremony	Award	Result
2007	Los Premios 40 Principales	Best International Song	Won
2007	MOBO Awards	Best Video	Nominated
2007	Teen Choice Awards	Choice Music: Single	Nominated
2007	MTV Video Music Awards	Video of the Year	Won
2007	MTV Video Music Awards	Monster Single of the Year	Won
2007	MTV Video Music Awards	Best Director	Nominated
2007	MTV Europe Music Awards	Most Addictive Track	Nominated
2007	MTV Italian Music Awards	Best Number One of the Year	Nominated
2007	Los Premios MTV Latinoamérica	Song of the Year	Nominated
2007	MuchMusic Video Awards	International Video of the Year – Artist	Nominated
2007	Nickelodeon Australian Kids' Choice Awards	Favorite Song	Nominated
2007	Nickelodeon Kids' Choice Awards UK	MTV Hits Best Music Video	Nominated
2007	VH1 Soul VIBE Awards	Video of the Year	Won
2008	Barbados Music Awards	Song of the Year	Won
2008	ECHO Awards	Hit of the Year	Nominated
2008	50th Annual Grammy Awards	Record of the Year	Nominated
2008	50th Annual Grammy Awards	Song of the Year	Nominated
2008	50th Annual Grammy Awards	Best Rap/Sung Collaboration	Won
2008	MTV Video Music Awards Japan	Best Video of the Year	Nominated
2008	NAACP Image Awards	Outstanding Song	Nominated
2008	Swiss Music Awards	International Song	Won
2008	MuchMusic Video Awards	Most Watched Video	Won

== Charts ==
=== Weekly charts ===
Chart (2007–2008)	Peak position
Australia (ARIA)	1
Australian Urban (ARIA)	1
Austria (Ö3 Austria Top 40)	1
Belgium (Ultratop 50 Flanders)	1
Belgium (Ultratop 50 Wallonia)	3
Brazil Airplay (Crowley)	3
Canada Hot 100 (Billboard)	1
CIS Airplay (TopHit)	2
Croatia International Airplay (HRT)	1
Czech Republic Airplay (ČNS IFPI)	2
Denmark (Tracklisten)	1
European Hot 100 Singles (Billboard)	1
Euro Digital Tracks (Billboard) Album version	8
Finland (Suomen virallinen lista)	2
France (SNEP)	6
Germany (GfK)	1
Greece (IFPI)	4
Hungary (Rádiós Top 40)	1
Hungary (Single Top 40)	5
Ireland (IRMA)	1
Italy (FIMI)	3
Netherlands (Dutch Top 40)	2
Netherlands (Single Top 100)	2
New Zealand (Recorded Music NZ)	1
Norway (VG-lista)	1
Portugal Digital Song Sales (Billboard)	3
Romania (Romanian Top 100)	2
Russia Airplay (TopHit)	1
Spain (PROMUSICAE)	1
Scottish Singles Sales (Official Charts)	1
Slovakia Airplay (ČNS IFPI)	1
Sweden (Sverigetopplistan)	2
Switzerland (Schweizer Hitparade)	1
UK Singles (Official Charts)	1
UK Airplay (Music Week)	1
UK Hip Hop/R&B (Official Charts)	1
US Billboard Hot 100	1
US Adult Pop Airplay (Billboard)	28
US Dance Club Songs (Billboard)	1
US Dance Airplay (Billboard)	1
US Hot R&B/Hip-Hop Songs (Billboard)	4
US Latin Pop Airplay (Billboard)	19
US Pop Airplay (Billboard)	2
US Rhythmic Airplay (Billboard)	3
Venezuela Pop Rock (Record Report)	1

Chart (2014)	Peak position
Ukraine Airplay (TopHit)	36

Chart (2023–2024)	Peak position
Canada (Canadian Hot 100)	31
Poland (Polish Airplay Top 100)	75
Portugal (AFP)	135
Romania Airplay (TopHit)	83
US Billboard Hot 100	37
Global 200 (Billboard)	32

Chart (2026)	Peak position
Romania Airplay (TopHit)	80

=== Year-end charts ===
Chart (2007)	Position
Australia (ARIA)	3
Australian Urban (ARIA)	2
Austria (Ö3 Austria Top 40)	2
Belgium (Ultratop 50 Flanders)	5
Belgium (Ultratop 50 Wallonia)	10
Brazil (Crowley)	5
CIS (TopHit)	9
European Hot 100 Singles (Billboard)	1
France (SNEP)	46
Germany (Media Control GfK)	5
Hungary (Rádiós Top 40)	11
Ireland (IRMA)	2
Italy (FIMI)	11
Netherlands (Dutch Top 40)	8
Netherlands (Single Top 100)	6
New Zealand (RIANZ)	1
Russia Airplay (TopHit)	5
Sweden (Sverigetopplistan)	9
Switzerland (Schweizer Hitparade)	2
UK Singles (OCC)	2
UK Urban (Music Week)	7
US Billboard Hot 100	2
US Dance Club Play (Billboard)	40
US Hot Dance Airplay (Billboard)	1
US Hot R&B/Hip-Hop Songs (Billboard)	39
US Rhythmic Airplay (Billboard)	3
Worldwide (IFPI)	3

Chart (2008)	Position
Australian Urban (ARIA)	32
Brazil (Crowley)	87
Canada (Canadian Hot 100)	97
Switzerland (Schweizer Hitparade)	86
UK Singles (OCC)	94

Year-end chart performance
Chart (2024)	Position
Romania Airplay (TopHit)	154

Year-end chart performance
Chart (2025)	Position
Romania Airplay (TopHit)	176

=== Decade-end charts ===
Chart (2000–2009)	Position
Australia (ARIA)	67
CIS Airplay (TopHit)	34
Germany (Media Control GfK)	72
Russia Airplay (TopHit)	28
UK Singles (OCC)	33
US Billboard Hot 100	57
US Hot Ringtones (Billboard)	29

== Certifications and sales ==
Region	Certification	Certified units/sales
Australia (ARIA)	15× Platinum	1,050,000^{‡}
Belgium (BRMA)	Platinum	50,000^{*}
Brazil (Pro-Música Brasil)	Diamond	250,000^{‡}
Brazil (Pro-Música Brasil) Digital media sales	Platinum	60,000^{*}
Canada	—	89,000
Denmark (IFPI Danmark)	3× Platinum	270,000^{‡}
Finland (Musiikkituottajat)	Platinum	10,784
Germany (BVMI)	2× Platinum	600,000^{‡}
Italy	—	20,580
Italy (FIMI) since 2009	2× Platinum	200,000^{‡}
Japan (RIAJ) Full-length ringtone	Gold	100,000^{*}
New Zealand (RMNZ)	7× Platinum	210,000^{‡}
Portugal (AFP)	3× Platinum	75,000^{‡}
Spain (Promusicae)	8× Platinum	160,000^{*}
Spain (Promusicae) Ringtone	10× Platinum	200,000^{*}
Spain (Promusicae) (since 2015)	2× Platinum	120,000^{‡}
Sweden (GLF)	2× Platinum	40,000^{‡}
Switzerland (IFPI Switzerland)	Gold	15,000^{^}
United Kingdom (BPI)	4× Platinum	2,400,000^{‡}
United States (RIAA)	Diamond	10,000,000^{‡}
United States (RIAA) Mastertone	2× Platinum	2,000,000^{*}
Streaming
Greece (IFPI Greece)	2× Platinum	4,000,000^{†}
^{*} Sales figures based on certification alone.^{^} Shipments figures based on certification alone.^{‡} Sales+streaming figures based on certification alone.^{†} Streaming-only figures based on certification alone.

== Release history ==
Release dates and formats
Region	Date	Version(s)	Format(s)	Label(s)	Ref.
Various	March 29, 2007	Original	Streaming	Def Jam	
United States	April 24, 2007	Original	Contemporary hit radio; rhythmic contemporary radio; urban contemporary radio	Def Jam	
Germany	May 25, 2007	Original	CD; maxi CD	Universal Music	
United Kingdom	May 28, 2007	Original	Maxi CD	Mercury	
United States	July 17, 2007	Travis Barker Remix	Digital download	Def Jam	
France	July 23, 2007	Original	CD	Barclay	
United States	July 31, 2007	Seamus Haji & Paul Emanuel Club Remix	Digital download	Def Jam	
United States	July 31, 2007	The Lindbergh Palace Remix	Digital download	Def Jam	
United States	July 31, 2007	Jody den Broeder Lush Club Remix	Digital download	Def Jam	

== Cover versions and remixes ==
Then-upcoming singer Marié Digby recorded an acoustic version of "Umbrella" which was released August 3, 2007, as the debut single from her Hollywood Records Start Here EP and included as the closing track on Digby's debut album Unfold.

Italian band Vanilla Sky released a punk cover of the song on their 2007 album Changes.

Swedish metal band Lillasyster covered the song on their 2007 album Hjärndöd Musik För En Hjärndöd Generation, and it peaked at No. 20 on the Swedish charts.

Sam Smith recorded the song during their Live at the Spectator concert in 2008 and it is also part of the soundtrack to the documentary film Sam Smith Diva Boy, which was a portrait of Sam 2007–2009.

American rock band Train covered the song in 2010 and was released in the deluxe edition of their album Save Me, San Francisco.

For her debut album a.k.a Cassandra, Filipina singer and actress KC Concepcion covered the song in English, while singer Miss Ganda recorded a version in Filipino entitled "Payong" (which means umbrella in Filipino). Singer and actress Mandy Moore sang an acoustic version of the song in 2007 and its video on YouTube has more than 6.6 million views by January 2019.

"Umbrella"

Promotional single by All Time Low

from the album Punk Goes Crunk
- Released: April 8, 2008
- Genre: Pop punk
- Label: Fearless

All Time Low chronology
"Umbrella" (2008)	"Dear Maria, Count Me In" (2008)

Pop-punk outfit All Time Low covered the song for the 2008 Fearless Records compilation album Punk Goes Crunk, and Welsh rock band Manic Street Preachers produced their own version of "Umbrella", which was originally recorded for the album NME Awards 2008. Produced in celebration of the Shockwaves NME Awards 2008 and Big Gig, that album was given free with a special souvenir box set of the magazine NME on February 27. Two additional versions (acoustic and Grand Slam mix) were later made available on iTunes, and the trio is now released together on an Umbrella EP; a video for the cover is available on the band's official website.

British pop rock band McFly performed their own version of "Umbrella" during their Greatest Hits So Far Tour in 2007, and Finnish melodic death metal band Children of Bodom performed their 2008 cover live at Wacken Open Air. Country-pop singer-songwriter Taylor Swift recorded a live version of the song, which was later included in an iTunes Store exclusive EP titled iTunes Live from SoHo (2008). Her version of the song peaked at number seventy-nine on Billboard Pop 100.

There have also been notable mixed versions of the song. American rapper Lil Mama recorded a version of "Umbrella" that replaced Jay-Z's opening rap verse. An article by Blender magazine, which dismissed Jay-Z's version, said "Lil Mama actually seems to understand the song's metaphorical themes of protection and loyalty". American punk band Blink-182 drummer Travis Barker remixed the song, adding to the track "quicksilver snare flourishes and... real-life guitars".

Singer Chris Brown created an answer song titled "Cinderella", replacing some of the verses and part of the chorus of "Umbrella" with his own lyrics. This version is the official remix. This version has been performed as a duet between Brown and Rihanna when he joined Rihanna on a late-2008 tour in the Asia-Pacific region. R&B/hip-hop singer The-Dream, who wrote "Umbrella", recorded the demo with a slightly different intro and instrumental. The remix was later removed from streaming services.

On October 15, 2015, Scott Bradlee's Postmodern Jukebox released a "Singin' in the Rain" style cover, featuring Casey Abrams & the Sole Sisters, surpassing 15 million views.

=== Lip syncing ===
On a third-season episode of the Spike television show Lip Sync Battle, actor Tom Holland won his match against actress Zendaya by lip syncing to "Umbrella" while dressed as Rihanna. His performance began with a lip-sync to Gene Kelly's rendition of "Singin' in the Rain" from the 1952 film Singin' in the Rain, before transitioning to "Umbrella".

== The Baseballs version ==
"Umbrella"

Single by The Baseballs

from the album Strike! and Strike! Back
- Released: May 1, 2009
- Length: 3:07
- Label: Warner Bros.

The Baseballs singles chronology
"Umbrella" (2009)	"Hot n Cold" (2009)

"Umbrella" was covered by the rockabilly coverband The Baseballs in 2009 for their albums Strike! and Strike! Back. It was certified Platinum in Finland by Musiikkituottajat – IFPI Finland.

Track listings

Promo CD and CD single
No.	Title	Length
1.	"Umbrella"	3:07
2.	"Bleeding Love"	3:52
Total length:		6:59

Release history

Date	Country	Format	Label
May 1, 2009	Europe	CD	Warner Bros. Records

Chart performance

Chart (2009–10)	Peak position
Austria (Ö3 Austria Top 40)	70
Belgium (Ultratop 50 Flanders)	30
Netherlands (Dutch Top 40)	4
Netherlands (Single Top 100)	5
Finland (Suomen virallinen lista)	1
Spain (Promusicae)	38
Spanish Airplay Chart	17
Sweden (Sverigetopplistan)	19
Switzerland (Schweizer Hitparade)	9

Year-end charts

Chart (2009)	Position
Switzerland (Schweizer Hitparade)	36

Chart (2010)	Position
Netherlands (Dutch Top 40)	33
Netherlands (Single Top 100)	28

== See also ==
- List of highest-certified singles in Australia
