= The Baseballs =

German rock and roll band

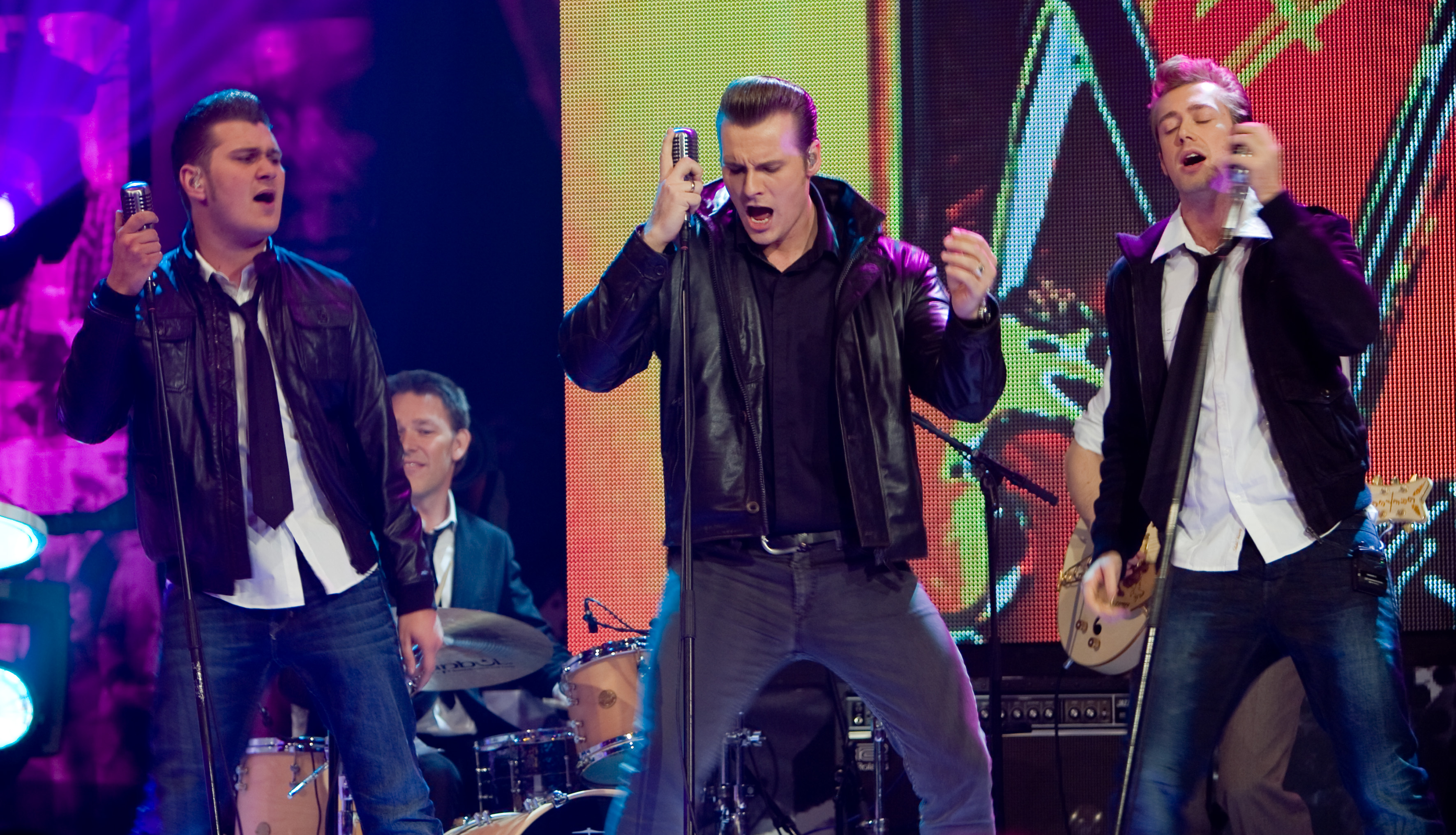

Background information
- Origin: Berlin, Germany
- Genres: Rock and roll, rockabilly
- Years active: 2007–present
- Labels: JMC Music and Warner Music
- Members: Sam (Sven Budja); Basti (Sebastian Raetzel); Back-up band Lars Vegas (guitar); Klaas Wendling (upright bass); Jan Miserre (piano); Tomas Svensson (drums)
- Past members: Digger (Rüdiger Brans)
- Website: thebaseballs.com

The Baseballs are a German rock and roll band founded in Berlin in 2007. They became popular with 1950s and 1960s style rock cover versions of modern pop hits such as "Umbrella" by Rihanna, "Crazy in Love" by Beyoncé, "Hot n Cold" by Katy Perry, and "Call Me Maybe" by Carly Rae Jepsen. The band members are only credited by their nicknames (Sam, Digger, and Basti). Their version of "Umbrella" was a hit in Germany, Spain, the Netherlands, Belgium, Finland, Iceland, Austria, Switzerland, Sweden, and Norway.

== Musical career ==
Their debut album, Strike!, was produced by JMC Music and released in May 2009 in Germany, Switzerland and Austria, in October 2009 in Finland, in December 2009 in Sweden, in February in Norway and in March 2010 in The Netherlands. It reached No. 15 in Austria, No. 6 in Germany, No. 2 in Switzerland and the Netherlands, No. 1 in Finland, No. 1 in Sweden and No. 1 in the Norwegian album charts. In the UK it was released on Rhino Records UK on 17 May 2010.

The band re-released the album in 2010 as Strike! Back! The lead single is a rockabilly version of Snow Patrol's "Chasing Cars." The video features the band rocking a 1950s prom.

In the UK, The Baseballs have appeared on ITV1's The David Dickinson Show, Magic Numbers and This Morning. In Ireland, The Baseballs have appeared on RTÉ's The Late Late Show. In Australia the group appeared on Channel 9's Hey Hey It's Saturday. In New Zealand they appeared on TVNZ's Good Morning.

In 2010 the band supported guitarist Jeff Beck on his "Emotion and Commotion" tour as his opening act.

On 6 June 2011, the Baseballs released their second album titled Strings 'n' Stripes. It included new singles tracks such as "Candy Shop", "Hello" and "Paparazzi".

On 1 August 2011, The Baseballs released together with General Mills – the producer of the ice cream Häagen-Dazs – within an advertising campaign with Cosma Shiva Hagen a free download of the song "Wha Wha" – which was written especially for the campaign. The track is freely available and can be downloaded from the German site of the brand Häagen-Dazs.

On 25 May 2012, The Baseballs released their first live CD/DVD, Strings 'n' Stripes Live.

On 17 July 2023, The Baseballs announced that Digger had left the band.

== Discography ==
=== Studio albums ===
Title	Album details	Peak chart positions											Certifications
Title	Album details	GER	AUT	BEL (FL)	DEN	ESP	FIN	NL	NOR	SWE	SWI	UK	Certifications
Strike!	Released: 15 May 2009; Label: Warner; Formats: CD, digital download	6	5	1	5	29	1	2	1	1	2	4	BVMI: Platinum; BPI: Gold; GLF: Platinum; IFPI FIN: 3× Platinum; IFPI NOR: Platinum; IFPI SWI: Platinum; NVPI: Platinum
Strings 'n' Stripes	Released: 15 April 2011; Label: Warner; Formats: CD, LP, digital download	5	3	10	—	29	2	4	—	4	1	74	
Good Ol' Christmas	Released: 11 February 2012; Label: Warner; Formats: CD, digital download	25	22	—	—	—	36	—	—	—	10	—	
Game Day	Released: 7 March 2014; Label: Warner; Formats: CD, digital download	22	17	—	—	—	—	88	—	—	5	—	
Hit Me Baby...	Released: 9 September 2016; Label: Warner; Formats: CD, digital download	9	8	54	—	—	—	62	—	—	4	—	
The Sun Sessions	Released: 20 October 2017; Label: Warner; Formats: CD, digital download	43	38	—	—	—	—	—	—	—	36	—	
Hot Shots	Released: 28 May 2021; Label: Electrola; Formats: CD, digital download	13	—	151	—	—	—	—	—	—	7	—	
"—" denotes a recording that did not chart or was not released in that territory.

=== Singles ===
Year	Single	Peak chart positions										Certifications (sales thresholds)	Album
Year	Single	GER	AUT	ESP	FIN	ICE	NL	NOR	SWE	SWI	UK	Certifications (sales thresholds)	Album
2009
2009	"Umbrella"	43	58	38	1	22	3	6	19	9	124	FIN: Platinum	Strike!
2009	"Hot n Cold"	68	65	—	7	—	99	—	—	52	—		Strike!
2010	"Last in Line"	—	—	—	13	—	—	—	—	—	—		Strike! Back!
2010	"Chasing Cars"	—	—	—	—	—	—	—	—	—	—		Strike! Back!
2011	"Candy Shop"	—	69	—	—	—	—	—	—	—	—		Strings 'N' Stripes
2011	"Hello"	100	41	—	—	—	—	—	—	68	—		Strings 'N' Stripes
2011	"This is a Night (Het is een Nacht)" (feat. Guus Meeuwis)	—	—	—	—	—	69	—	—	—	—		Strings 'N' Stripes

Various releases

- 2011: "Wha Wha" (Promotional)
- 2016: "...Baby One More Time"
- 2019: Cadillac Maniac ft. Kissin Dynamite
- 2020: "Don't Worry, Be Happy"
- 2020: "Take On Me"
- 2020: "Wake Me Up Before You Go-Go"
- 2021: "Rock Me Amadeus"

== Awards ==
Year	Ceremony	Award	Result
2010	EMMA Awards	Best selling Album	Won
2010	ECHO Awards	Best National Newcomer	Won
2011	EBBA Awards	European Border Breakers Award	Won
2011	EBBA Awards	Public Choice Award	Won
2011	ECHO Awards	Most successful Act on foreign country, national	Won
