= Strike! (album) =

Studio album by The Baseballs
- Released: 15 May 2009
- Genre: Rock and roll; rockabilly
- Label: Warner Music Group

The Baseballs chronology
Strike! (2009)	Strings 'n' Stripes (2011)

Alternative cover
- Cover for Strike! Back

Singles from Strike! and Strike! Back
- 1. "Umbrella" Released: 1 May 2009; 2. "Hot n Cold" Released: 2009; 3. "Last in Line" Released: 2010; 4. "Chasing Cars" Released: 2010

Professional ratings
Review scores
Source	Rating
Allmusic	3/5 stars

Strike! is the debut album released by The Baseballs, a German rock 'n' roll cover band, in 2009.

Their debut album Strike! was released in May 2009 in Germany, Switzerland and Austria and in October 2009 in Finland. It reached number six in Germany, number two in the Swiss and number one in the Finnish album charts. In Finland Strike! was the best-selling album of 2009 with sales of 73,626 units (triple platinum), with total sales of over 96,000 units (quadruple platinum) to date.

In April 2010, the album was re-released as Strike! Back, with a cover version of Nylon Beat's song "Last in Line" as an extra.

== Track listing ==
=== Strike! ===
No.	Title	Writer(s)	Length
1.	"Umbrella"	(Rihanna cover)	3:07
2.	"Love in This Club"	(Usher cover)	3:20
3.	"Hey There Delilah"	(Plain White T's cover)	3:43
4.	"Bleeding Love"	(Leona Lewis cover)	3:52
5.	"Hot n Cold"	(Katy Perry cover)	3:37
6.	"I Don't Feel Like Dancin'"	(Scissor Sisters cover)	4:06
7.	"Don't Cha"	(Pussycat Dolls cover)	4:07
8.	"Let's Get Loud"	(Jennifer Lopez cover)	3:30
9.	"Angels"	(Robbie Williams cover)	3:18
10.	"Crazy in Love"	(Beyoncé cover)	3:16
11.	"This Love"	(Maroon 5 cover)	3:24
12.	"The Look" (bonus track)	(Roxette cover)	3:24

=== Strike! Back ===
==== CD1 ====
No.	Title	Writer(s)	Length
1.	"Umbrella"	(Rihanna cover)	3:07
2.	"Love in This Club"	(Usher cover)	3:20
3.	"Hey There Delilah"	(Plain White T's cover)	3:43
4.	"Bleeding Love"	(Leona Lewis cover)	3:52
5.	"Hot n Cold"	(Katy Perry cover)	3:37
6.	"I Don't Feel Like Dancin'"	(Scissor Sisters cover)	4:06
7.	"Don't Cha"	(Pussycat Dolls cover)	4:07
8.	"Let's Get Loud"	(Jennifer Lopez cover)	3:30
9.	"Angels"	(Robbie Williams cover)	3:18
10.	"Crazy in Love"	(Beyoncé cover)	3:16
11.	"This Love"	(Maroon 5 cover)	3:24
12.	"The Look" (bonus track)	(Roxette cover)	3:24

==== CD2 ====
No.	Title	Writer(s)	Length
1.	"No One"	(Alicia Keys cover)	3:38
2.	"Chasing Cars"	(Snow Patrol cover)	2:51
3.	"Monday Morning"	(Melanie Fiona cover)	3:55
4.	"Poker Face"	(Lady Gaga cover)	2:23
5.	"Jungle Drum"	(Emilíana Torrini cover)	2:28
6.	"A Day on Tour with The Baseballs" (video)		19:43
7.	"The Baseballs in Finland" (video)		25:33

== Chart performance ==
=== Weekly charts ===
Strike!

Chart (2009–10)	Peak position
Australian Albums (ARIA)	37
Austrian Albums (Ö3 Austria)	5
Belgian Albums (Ultratop Flanders)	1
Belgian Albums (Ultratop Wallonia)	52
Danish Albums (Hitlisten)	5
Dutch Albums (Album Top 100)	2
Finnish Albums (Suomen virallinen lista)	1
French Albums (SNEP)	24
German Albums (Offizielle Top 100)	6
Greek Albums (IFPI)	36
Irish Albums (IRMA)	21
Italian Albums (FIMI)	55
Mexican Albums (Top 100 Mexico)	47
Norwegian Albums (VG-lista)	1
Scottish Albums (OCC)	3
Spanish Albums (Promusicae)	29
Swedish Albums (Sverigetopplistan)	1
Swiss Albums (Schweizer Hitparade)	2
UK Albums (OCC)	4
UK Album Downloads (OCC)	2

Strike! Back

Chart (2010)	Peak position
Austrian Albums (Ö3 Austria)	19
Dutch Albums (Album Top 100)	43

=== Year-end charts ===
Strike!

Chart (2009)	Position
Finnish Albums (Suomen virallinen lista)	1
German Albums (Offizielle Top 100)	54
Swiss Albums (Schweizer Hitparade)	4

Chart (2010)	Position
Belgian Albums (Ultratop Flanders)	24
Dutch Albums (Album Top 100)	6
Swedish Albums (Sverigetopplistan)	6
Swiss Albums (Schweizer Hitparade)	29

Strike! Back

Chart (2010)	Position
Austrian Albums (Ö3 Austria)	73

== Certifications ==
Certifications for Strike!
Region	Certification	Certified units/sales
Finland (Musiikkituottajat)	3× Platinum	96,977
Germany (BVMI)	Platinum	200,000^{^}
Netherlands (NVPI)	Platinum	50,000
Norway (IFPI Norway)	Platinum	30,000^{*}
Sweden (GLF)	Platinum	40,000^{‡}
Switzerland (IFPI Switzerland)	Platinum	30,000^{^}
United Kingdom (BPI)	Gold	100,000^{*}
^{*} Sales figures based on certification alone.^{^} Shipments figures based on certification alone.^{‡} Sales+streaming figures based on certification alone.

Certifications for Strike! Back
Region	Certification	Certified units/sales
Austria (IFPI Austria)	Platinum	20,000^{*}
^{*} Sales figures based on certification alone.
