= Het is een nacht... (Levensecht) =

1995 debut single by Guus Meeuwis

Single by Guus Meeuwis

from the album Verbazing
- B-side: "Het is een nacht... (Levensecht) (Live)"
- Released: July 29, 1995
- Recorded: 1994
- Genre: Pop; acoustic pop
- Length: 3:45
- Label: XPLO
- Songwriter: Guus Meeuwis
- Producer: Ad Kraamer

Guus Meeuwis singles chronology
"Het is een nacht... (Levensecht)" (1995)	"Per spoor (Kedeng kedeng)" (1996)

Music video
- "Het is een nacht" on YouTube

"Het is een nacht... (Levensecht)" (English: "It is a Night... (Lifelike)") is the debut single by Dutch artist Guus Meeuwis. The song was produced by Ad Kraamer and written by Meeuwis. It was released in 1995 as the lead single from Meeuwis's debut studio album Verbazing. It was highly successful in the Netherlands and Belgium where it peaked atop the national singles chart in both countries and emerged as the year's best-selling single.

To promote the song a music video was filmed, showing a performance at a bar by Guus Meeuwis. Additionally, he performed it live during several live concerts and televised appearances. Two updated versions of the song were released, including one by German band The Baseballs in 2011 and one featuring Dutch rapper Kraantje Pappie in 2020.

== Background ==
Guus Meeuwis wrote "Het is een nacht" after a romantic weekend with his girlfriend Valérie Gregoire in Bruges. In 1994, Meeuwis and a couple of friends entered a talent competition (the AHC-Studentensongfestival) in Leiden with this song and won. As a result, the group was offered a recording contract by Willem van Schijndel, under the name "Guus Meeuwis & Vagant".

In 2025, he appeared on the Dutch TV show Liefde voor Muziek where he explained that the song came to existence "I studied for a year and a half in Leuven and went up to a café with a piano and a guitar. I wrote the song there."

== Chart performance ==
The song became a huge hit in The Netherlands and Belgium and reached the peak position in both the Dutch and Belgian charts. It spent seven weeks at number one in the Dutch Top 40 and eight weeks at number one in the Mega Single Top 100 and the Ultratop 50. More than 250,000 copies were sold.

The song was placed at number 10 on the Top 40 Biggest Dutch-language Hits of All Time list compiled in 2023. It appeared on the NPO Radio 2's Top 2000 list, with the highest position of 653 in 2021.

== Live performances ==
"Het is een nacht" was performed live by Meeuwis during several televised appearances and as part of his concert tours and live gigs. In 2012, 2013 and 2019 he performed it as part of his concert Groots met een zachte G, the second time being accompanied by the band Racoon.

On 22 August 2015, he performed the song live at the tenth year anniversary of Q-music. On 26 November 2019, he performed it live during a televised appearance on the famous show De Wereld Draait Door. On 2 August 2020, Meeuwis performed the song live uring a televised appearance on Muziekcafé in Poppodium 013 at Club Zoveel. On 23 November 2024, he performed the song together with Hispanic singer Rolf Sanchez in both Spanish and Dutch at The Streamers concert.

In 2025, he performed "Het is een nacht" during the Tien om te Zien concert held on 15 August. He performed it live on 19 December 2025 during the 3FM Serious Request concert at NPO 3FM. On 20 March 2026, he performed the song live at De Vrienden van Amstel concert where he sang it together with Dutch Indie group Son Mieux and along with the song "Tonight".

On 15 June 2021, Dutch rapper Ronnie Flex and Dutch singer Emma Heesters performed a cover of "Het is een nacht" live at Q Music's De Foute 1500.

== Charts ==
=== Weekly charts ===
Chart (1995–1996)	Peak position
Belgium (Ultratop 50 Flanders)	1
Netherlands (Dutch Top 40)	1
Netherlands (Single Top 100)	1

=== Year-end charts ===
Chart (1995)	Position
Belgium (Ultratop Flanders)	1
Netherlands (Dutch Top 40)	1
Netherlands (Single Top 100)	1

=== Decade-end charts ===
Chart (1990–1999)	Position
Belgium (Ultratop Flanders)	9
Netherlands (Dutch Top 40)	2

== The Baseballs cover ==
"This is a Night (Het is een nacht)"

Single by The Baseballs featuring Guus Meeuwis

from the album Strings 'n' Stripes
- Released: May 23, 2011
- Genre: Rock 'n roll
- Length: 3:07
- Label: Warner Music Group
- Songwriter: Guus Meeuwis
- Producer: JMC Music

The Baseballs singles chronology
"Hello" (2011)	"This is a Night (Het is een nacht" (2011)	"Wha Wha" (2011)

"Het is een nacht... (Levensecht)" was covered by the rockabilly cover band, The Baseballs, in 2011, under the name "This is a Night (Het is een nacht)", featuring vocals by Meeuwis. The lyrics were partially translated into English. The single is included on the Dutch version of The Baseballs' album Strings 'n' Stripes, as well on a special edition of Meeuwis's album Armen open. The song debuted at number 83 on the Mega Single Top 100 for the chart issue dated 28 May 2011. The following week, it reached the 69th position on the chart which also marked its peak position. It fell off the chart for the issue dated 11 June only to return the next week. It spent a total of four weeks on the chart. On 27 May 2011, The Baseballs performed the song live together with Meeuwis at Radio 538.

=== Charts ===
Chart (2011)	Peak position
Netherlands (Mega Single Top 100)	69

== Kraantje Pappie cover ==
"Nacht"

Single by Guus Meeuwis featuring Kraantje Pappie

from the album Op Deel Zoveel
- Released: 10 January, 2020
- Length: 3:34
- Label: Modestus Records, Noah's Ark
- Songwriter: Guus Meeuwis
- Producer: Palm Trees

Guus Meeuwis featuring Kraantje Pappie singles chronology
"Nooit niet verliefd" (2019)	"Nacht" (2020)	"Was je maar hier" (2020)

Kraantje Pappie singles chronology
"Getaway" (2019)	"Nacht" (2020)	"Rode wijn" (2020)

A rework of the song titled "Nacht" featuring Dutch rapper Kraantje Pappie was released on 10 January 2020 in the midst of the COVID-19 pandemic. It was later included on the second CD of Guus Meeuwis's studio album Deel Zoveel (2020).

Before the official release, both Kraantje and Guus released a brief teaser video through their Instagram accounts on 9 January 2020. The new version of the song makes wide use of autotune and is produced by Palm Trees. Speaking to Brabants Bont from the portal Omroep Brabant about the song, Meeuwis said that he sees it as a tribute rather than a rework of the original version: "It is as if 'Het is een nacht' was taken to the sun. The song is timeless. When I perform I see rows full of young people who were not born when the song came out. They sing as loud as the rest."

"Nacht" was commercially successful, peaking at number 25 on the Dutch Top 40 where it also spent 6 weeks charting. On the Single Top 100, the song debuted at number 26 for the week of 18 January 2020. It later moved to its peak position of number 17 in its fifth week on the chart, on 15 February 2020.

To promote the song, the two appeared in a music video which was filmed in London. The video follows them during a night out; they take a limousine, take pictures with a fan on the street, go shopping for new clothes, eat at a luxurious restaurant, take selfies at various locations in the city and end up drinking beer together. Scenes of various tourist attractions and buildings in London are also interspersed in the video. They also appeared at the 2020 Vrienden van Amstel concert, where they sang the song live.

Credits and personnel

- Credits for "Nacht" are taken from the official music video on YouTube.
- Video direction - Machiel Hofman
- Camera - Tim Toorman
- Edit and Montage - Bas van Schellen
- Video production - Fast Forward
- Music production - Palm Trees
- Mix - Nightwatch

Chart (2020)	Peak position
Netherlands (Dutch Top 40)	25
Netherlands (Single Top 100)	17

== See also ==
- List of Dutch Top 40 number-one singles of 1995
- List of Ultratop 50 number-one singles of 1995
