= 2007 MTV Movie Awards =

American film awards ceremony

- Date: Sunday, June 3, 2007
- Location: Gibson Amphitheatre, Universal City, California
- Country: United States
- Hosted by: Sarah Silverman

Television/radio coverage
- Network: MTV
- Produced by: Mark Burnett
- Directed by: Joe DeMaio

The 2007 MTV Movie Awards took place on June 3, 2007 (June 4 in Europe), and were hosted by Sarah Silverman. The ceremony featured performances by Rihanna featuring Jay-Z, who performed "Umbrella", and Amy Winehouse, who performed "Rehab". It was the first MTV Movie Awards show broadcast live to American audiences, and it was located at the Gibson Amphitheatre in Universal City, California. Mark Burnett directed the show and executive produced this year's ceremony. Nominees were announced on April 30, 2007, and the voting for the main categories ran until the end of May.

A pre-recorded movie parody included Sarah Silverman re-enacting with the characters from Babel, Dreamgirls, The Pursuit of Happyness, The Departed, 300, The Devil Wears Prada, and Transformers. Sarah Silverman repeatedly made negative jokes towards Paris Hilton, which caused mixed reactions from the general audience. The audience at the Gibson Amphitheatre, however, were cheering after Silverman stated that Paris was going to jail very soon. In 2011, it was reported that Sarah apologized to Paris for joking about her prison time.

The pre-show was the subject of a rather vociferous ad campaign for the upcoming summer flick Transformers (distributed by Paramount Pictures, a subsidiary of Viacom, which also owns MTV), which included an extended interview with star Shia LaBeouf, several sneak previews, a "real-life" example of a car used in the movie, etc. The focus on the film was further reinforced when the film won in the category "Best Summer Movie You Haven't Seen Yet." The pre-show also included Hilton's last interview before entering jail.

== Performers ==
- Rihanna featuring Jay-Z — "Umbrella"
- Amy Winehouse — "Rehab"

== Presenters ==
- Jessica Alba, Chris Evans, Michael Chiklis, and Ioan Gruffudd — presented Best Villain
- Bruce Willis and Justin Long — presented Best Fight
- Dane Cook — presented Movie Spoof Finalists
- Chris Tucker and Victoria Beckham — introduced Rihanna and Jay-Z
- Adam Sandler, Kevin James, and Jessica Biel — presented Best Kiss
- Web Wall Viewer, Kathy — presented Breakthrough Performance
- Robin Williams, Mandy Moore, and John Krasinski — presented Best Comedic Performance
- Cameron Diaz — presented the MTV Generation Award
- Samuel L. Jackson — presented Best Movie Spoof
- Bruce Willis — introduced Amy Winehouse
- Seth Rogen and Eva Mendes — presented Best Summer Movie You Haven't Seen Yet
- Shia LaBeouf, Josh Duhamel, and Tyrese Gibson — presented Best Performance
- John Travolta, Zac Efron, and Amanda Bynes — presented Best Movie

== Awards ==
Below are the list of nominations. Winners are listed first and highlighted in bold.

Best Movie
**Pirates of the Caribbean: Dead Man's Chest**; 300; Blades of Glory; Borat; Little Miss Sunshine
Best Performance	Breakthrough Performance
**Johnny Depp – Pirates of the Caribbean: Dead Man's Chest**; Gerard Butler – 300; Jennifer Hudson – Dreamgirls; Keira Knightley – Pirates of the Caribbean: Dead Man's Chest; Beyoncé – Dreamgirls; Will Smith – The Pursuit of Happyness	**Jaden Smith – The Pursuit of Happyness**; Emily Blunt – The Devil Wears Prada; Abigail Breslin – Little Miss Sunshine; Lena Headey – 300; Mary Elizabeth Winstead – Final Destination 3; Justin Timberlake – Alpha Dog
Best Villain	Best Comedic Performance
**Jack Nicholson – The Departed**; Tobin Bell – Saw III; Bill Nighy – Pirates of the Caribbean: Dead Man's Chest; Rodrigo Santoro – 300; Meryl Streep – The Devil Wears Prada	**Sacha Baron Cohen – Borat: Cultural Learnings of America for Make Benefit Glorious Nation of Kazakhstan**; Emily Blunt – The Devil Wears Prada; Will Ferrell – Blades of Glory; Adam Sandler – Click; Ben Stiller – Night at the Museum
Best Kiss	Best Fight
**Will Ferrell and Sacha Baron Cohen – Talladega Nights: The Ballad of Ricky Bobby**; Cameron Diaz and Jude Law – The Holiday; Columbus Short and Meagan Good – Stomp the Yard; Mark Wahlberg and Elizabeth Banks – Invincible; Marlon Wayans and Brittany Daniel – Little Man	**Gerard Butler vs. the Uber Immortal – 300**; Jack Black and Héctor Jiménez vs. Los Duendes – Nacho Libre; Sacha Baron Cohen vs. Ken Davitian – Borat: Cultural Learnings of America for Make Benefit Glorious Nation of Kazakhstan; Will Ferrell vs. Jon Heder – Blades of Glory; Uma Thurman vs. Anna Faris – My Super Ex-Girlfriend
Best Summer Movie You Haven't Seen Yet	Fair One Best Filmmaker on Campus
**Transformers**; Rush Hour 3; Hairspray; Fantastic Four: Rise of the Silver Surfer; Spider-Man 3; Evan Almighty; Harry Potter and the Order of the Phoenix; I Now Pronounce You Chuck and Larry; The Simpsons Movie	**Josh Greenbaum – Border Patrol (from University of Southern California)**; Robert Dastoli – Southwestern Orange County vs. The Flying Saucers (from University of Central Florida); Maria Gigante – Girls Room (from Columbia College Chicago); Alexander Poe – Please Forget I Exist (from Columbia University); Andrew Shipsides – Bottleneck (from Savannah College of Art & Design)
MTV Movie Spoof Award	Orbit Dirtiest Mouth Moment
**United 300 – Andy Signore**; Texas Chainsaw Musical – Paul Morrell and Zan Passante; Texas Chainsaw Massacre: The Rehab – Noah Harald; Casino Royale with Cheese – Bill Caco; Quentin Tarantino's Little Miss Squirtgun – Velcro Troupe	**Jason Mewes and Kevin Smith – Clerks II**; Alicia Keys and Common – Smokin' Aces; Steve-O – Jackass Number Two; Dax Shepard and Efren Ramirez – Employee of the Month

=== MTV Generation Award ===
- **Mike Myers**
