= Guus Meeuwis =

Dutch singer-songwriter

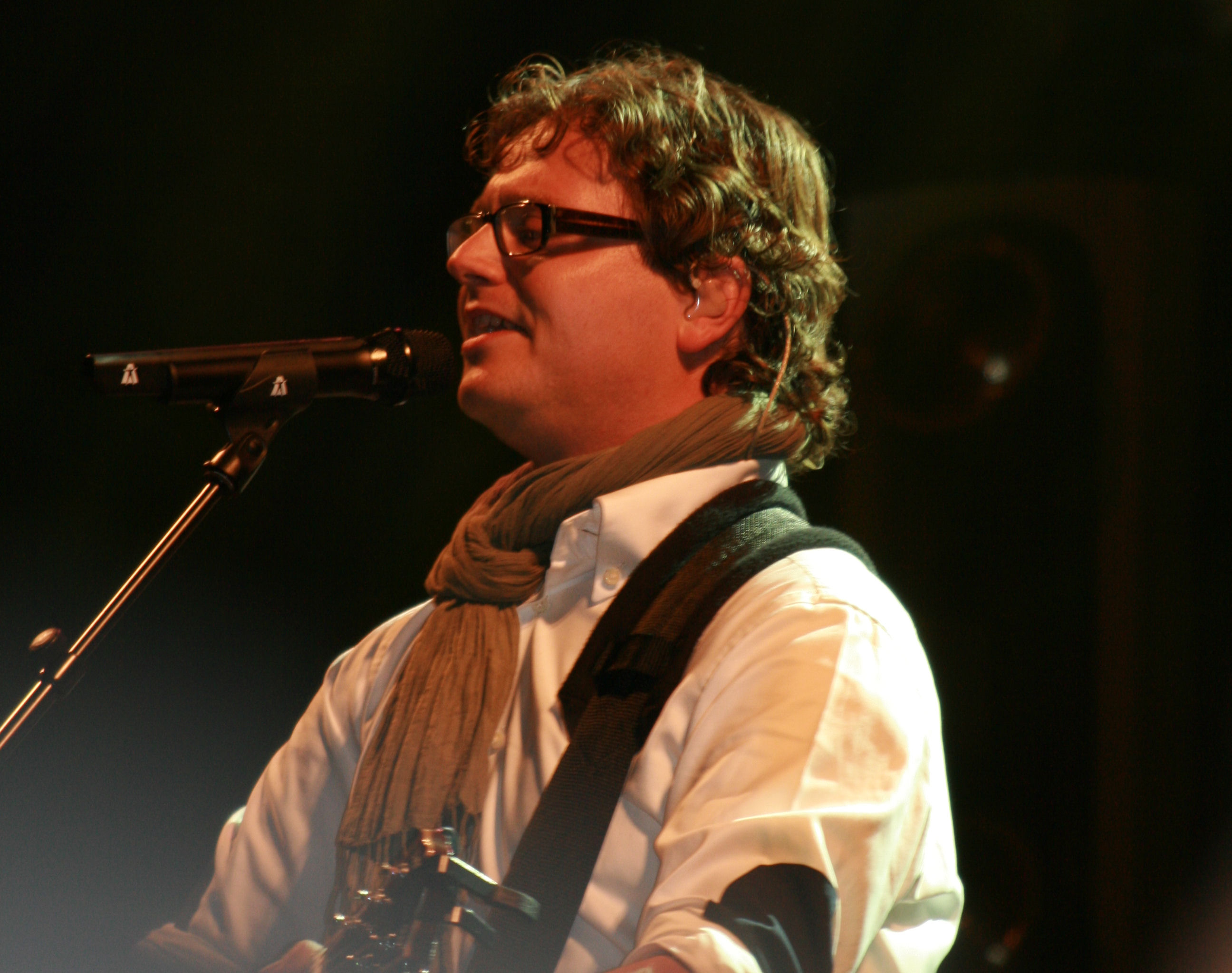
- Meeuwis performing in 2007

Background information
- Born: 23 March 1972 (age 54); Mariahout, Netherlands
- Genres: Pop
- Instruments: Vocals, guitar
- Years active: 1995–present
- Website: https://www.guusmeeuwis.nl/

Gustaaf Stephanus Modestus "Guus" Meeuwis (born 23 March 1972) is a Dutch singer-songwriter. As part of the band Vagant, he scored several hits in the Netherlands and Flanders during the 1990s and first decade of the 2000s. On 24 May 2015, Meeuwis became the first Dutch language performing artist ever to play a fully booked concert at London's Royal Albert Hall.

== Biography ==
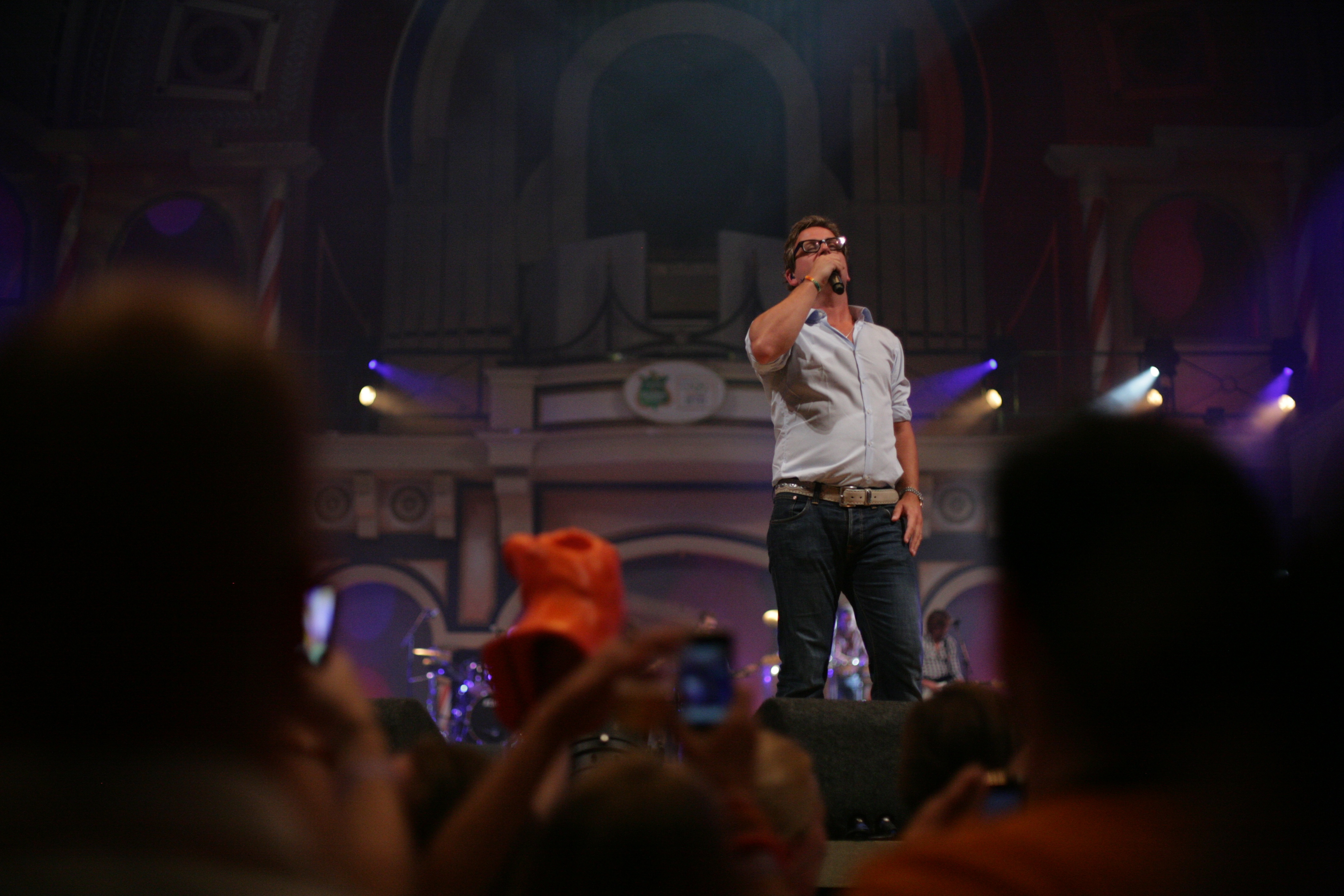
Guus Meeuwis in the Holland Heineken House in 2012.

Guus Meeuwis was born at a monastery in Mariahout, a small village in the municipality of Laarbeek where his parents were living temporarily. He attended Stella Maris College, and went on to study jurisprudence in Tilburg. It quickly became apparent that Meeuwis was musically talented while at school. Following a romantic weekend in Bruges with his girlfriend Valérie he wrote the song "Het is een Nacht" ("It is a Night"), with which, in 1994, he won a prize at the AHC-Studentensongfestival in Leiden. He and his backing band were awarded a record contract, under the name "Guus Meeuwis & Vagant", after a café they frequented. Vagant consisted of Marc Meeuwis, Jan Willem Rozenboom, Hugo van Bilsen, Robin van Beek and Dirk Oerlemans. At the end of 2001, the group decided to split and Meeuwis continued on as a solo artist. Marc Meeuwis and Jan Willem Rozenboom are still involved with Meeuwis as of 2023.

== Honours ==
- Knight of the Order of Orange-Nassau (2013)

== Guus Meeuwis & Vagant discography ==
=== Studio albums ===
Title	Album details	Peak chart positions		Certifications
Title	Album details	NL	BEL (FLA)	Certifications
Verbazing	Released: 29 April 1996; Label: WVS Music	1	41	NVPI: 2× Platinum
Schilderij	Released: 1 December 1997; Label: WVS Music	14	—	NVPI: Platinum
1 voor allen	Released: 29 March 2001; Label: WVS Music	34	—	
"—" denotes items which were not released in that country or failed to chart.

=== Singles ===
Title	Year	Peak chart positions			Album
Title	Year	NL Top 40	NL Top 100	BEL (FLA)	Album
"Het is een nacht..."	1995	1	1	1	Verbazing
"Per spoor (Kedeng kedeng)"	1996	1	1	5	Verbazing
"Zo ver weg"	1996	3	4	47	Verbazing
"Verliefd zijn"	1996	36	37	—	Verbazing
"Ik tel tot 3"	1997	16	23	— (Note: "Ik tel tot 3" did not enter the Ultratop 50, but peaked at number fourteen on the Ultratip chart, which acts as an extension to the Ultratop 50.)	Schilderij
"'t Dondert en 't bliksemt"	1998	12	15	—	Schilderij
"Ik wil met je lachen"	1998	19	21	—	Schilderij
"Ze houdt gewoon van mij"	1999	— (Note: "Ze houdt gewoon van mij" did not enter the Dutch Top 40, but peaked at number three on the Tipparade chart, which acts as an extension to the Top 40.)	50	—	1 voor allen
"Je hoeft niet veel van me te houden"	1999	— (Note: "Je hoeft niet veel van me te houden" did not enter the Dutch Top 40, but peaked at number fourteen on the Tipparade chart, which acts as an extension to the Top 40.)	53	—	1 voor allen
"Denk nou eens na"	2000	—	74	—	1 voor allen
"Op straat"	2001	—	62	—	1 voor allen
"Haven in zicht"	2001	—	86	—	1 voor allen
"—" denotes items which were not released in that country or failed to chart.

== Solo discography ==
=== Studio albums ===
Title	Album details	Peak chart positions		Certifications
Title	Album details	NL	BEL (FLA)	Certifications
Guus Meeuwis	Released: September 2002; Label: EMI Music	25	—	
Wijzer	Released: 29 October 2005; Label: EMI Music	5	—	NVPI: Platinum
Hemel nr. 7	Released: 14 September 2007; Label: EMI Music	1	—	NVPI: Platinum
NW8	Released: 11 May 2009; Label: EMI Music	1	—	NVPI: 2× Platinum
Armen open	Released: 13 May 2011; Label: Universal Music	1	—	NVPI: Platinum
Het kan hier zo mooi zijn	Released: 10 May 2013; Label: Universal Music	2	170	NVPI: Gold
Hollandse meesters with New Cool Collective	Released: 17 October 2014; Label: Universal Music	1	188	NVPI: Gold
Morgen	Released: 9 October 2015; Label: Universal Music	1	49	NVPI: Platinum
Geluk	Released: 18 May 2018; Label: Modestus	1	35	NVPI: Gold
Deel zoveel	Released: 31 July 2020; Label: Modestus	1	164	NVPI: Gold
Uit het hoofd	Released: 19 May 2023; Label: Modestus	3	141	
"—" denotes items which were not released in that country or failed to chart.

=== Compilation albums ===
Title	Album details	Peak chart positions	Certifications
Title	Album details	NL	Certifications
Tien jaar levensecht	Released: 5 November 2004; Label: EMI Music	1	NVPI: Platinum
Het beste van Guus Meeuwis	Released: 12 November 2010; Label: EMI Music	2	NVPI: Platinum
"—" denotes items which were not released in that country or failed to chart.

=== Live albums ===
Title	Album details	Peak chart positions		Certifications
Title	Album details	NL	BEL (FLA)	Certifications
Live in het Philips Stadion	Released: 1 September 2006; Label: EMI Music	6	—	NVPI: Platinum
Groots met een zachte G — Live in het Philips Stadion 2007	Released: 21 November 2007; Label: EMI Music	13	—	
Groots met een zachte G — Live in het Philips Stadion 2008	Released: 10 September 2008; Label: EMI Music	4	—	NVPI: Platinum
Groots met een zachte G 2010	Released: 10 September 2010; Label: EMI Music	2	—	NVPI: Gold
Groots met een zachte G 2013	Released: 4 October 2013; Label: Universal Music	2	193	
Groots met een zachte G 2022 – Live in het Philips Stadion	Released: 9 December 2022; Label: Modestus	17	—	
Groots De Laatste – Live in het Philips Stadion	Released: 24 October 2024; Label: Modestus		—	
"—" denotes items which were not released in that country or failed to chart.

=== Singles ===
==== As lead artist ====
Title	Year	Peak chart positions			Album
Title	Year	NL Top 40	NL Top 100	BEL (FLA)	Album
"Leve het leven"	2002	—	70	—	Non-album single
"Eerste lief"	2002	—	85	—	Guus Meeuwis
"Brabant"	2003	— (Note: "Brabant" did not enter the Dutch Top 40, but peaked at number eight on the Tipparade chart, which acts as an extension to the Top 40.)	28	—	Guus Meeuwis
"Ik wil je"	2003	— (Note: "Ik wil je" did not enter the Dutch Top 40, but peaked at number three on the Tipparade chart, which acts as an extension to the Top 40.)	30	—	Guus Meeuwis
"Hé zon"	2003	—	94	—	Non-album singles
"Waar moet 'ie in? (Daar moet 'ie in)" (with Edwin Evers)	2004	17	—	—	Non-album singles
"Toen ik je zag"	2004	—	39	—	10 jaar levensecht
"Geef mij je angst"	2005	1	1	—	10 jaar levensecht
"De weg"	2005	7	8	—	Wijzer
"Jouw hand"	2006	30	28	—	Wijzer
"Ik wil dat ons land juicht"	2006	5	2	—	Live in het Philips Stadion 2006
"Tranen gelachen"	2007	1	1	—	Hemel nr. 7
"Proosten"	2007	3	1	—	Hemel nr. 7
"Genoten"	2007	— (Note: "Genoten" did not enter the Dutch Top 40, but peaked at number four on the Tipparade chart, which acts as an extension to the Top 40.)	58	—	Hemel nr. 7
"Ik wil nog niet naar huis"	2008	33	10	—	Groots met een zachte G — Live in het Philips Stadion 2008
"Dat komt door jou"	2009	11	4	—	NW8
"Ik ook van jou"	2009	32	39	—	NW8
"Laat mij in die waan"	2009	— (Note: "Laat mij in die waan" did not enter the Dutch Top 40, but peaked at number two on the Tipparade chart, which acts as an extension to the Top 40.)	6	—	NW8
"Schouder aan schouder" (with Marco Borsato)	2010	2	1	— (Note: "Schouder aan schouder" did not enter the Ultratop 50, but peaked at number fifteen on the Ultratip chart, which acts as an extension to the Ultratop 50.)	Groots met een zachte G 2010
"Majesteit" (with Youp van 't Hek)	2010	—	2	—	Non-album single
"Dit lied"	2011	22	8	—	Armen open
"Armen open"	2011	— (Note: "Armen open" did not enter the Dutch Top 40, but peaked at number three on the Tipparade chart, which acts as an extension to the Top 40.)	1	— (Note: "Armen open" did not enter the Ultratop 50, but peaked at number 23 on the Ultratip chart, which acts as an extension to the Ultratop 50.)	Armen open
"Als ze danst"	2011	— (Note: "Als ze danst" did not enter the Dutch Top 40, but peaked at number twelve on the Tipparade chart, which acts as an extension to the Top 40.)	97	—	Armen open
"Nergens zonder jou" (with Gers Pardoel)	2011	5	5	—	Armen open
"Het kan hier zo mooi zijn"	2013	26	4	—	Het kan hier zo mooi zijn
"Zeeën van tijd"	2013	— (Note: "Zeeën van tijd" did not enter the Dutch Top 40, but peaked at number eleven on the Tipparade chart, which acts as an extension to the Top 40.)	62	—	Het kan hier zo mooi zijn
"Als de liefde"	2013	— (Note: "Als de liefde" did not enter the Dutch Top 40, but peaked at number 28 on the Tipparade chart, which acts as an extension to the Top 40.)	—	—	Non-album singles
"Zonder jou"	2014	— (Note: "Zonder jou" did not enter the Dutch Top 40, but peaked at number four on the Tipparade chart, which acts as an extension to the Top 40.)	33	—	Non-album singles
"Jij bent de liefde"	2015	— (Note: "Jij bent de liefde" did not enter the Dutch Top 40, but peaked at number two on the Tipparade chart, which acts as an extension to the Top 40.)	64	—	Morgen
"Dankjewel"	2015	— (Note: "Dankjewel" did not enter the Dutch Top 40, but peaked at number seven on the Tipparade chart, which acts as an extension to the Top 40.)	—	—	Morgen
"Kus van mij"	2016	— (Note: "Kus van mij" did not enter the Dutch Top 40, but peaked at number ten on the Tipparade chart, which acts as an extension to the Top 40.)	—	—	Morgen
"Tabee 2016 with Diggy Dex"	2016	— (Note: "Tabee 2016" did not enter the Dutch Top 40, but peaked at number nineteen on the Tipparade chart, which acts as an extension to the Top 40.)	—	—	Non-album single
"Je staat niet alleen"	2018	—	—	—	Geluk
"Je moet het voelen"	2018	— (Note: "Je moet het voelen" did not enter the Dutch Top 40, but peaked at number ten on the Tipparade chart, which acts as an extension to the Top 40.)	—	—	Geluk
"Kom we gaan"	2019	— (Note: "Kom we gaan" did not enter the Dutch Top 40, but peaked at number one on the Tipparade chart, which acts as an extension to the Top 40.)	—	—	Geluk
"Nooit niet verliefd with Sunnery James & Ryan Marciano"	2019	— (Note: "Nooit niet verliefd" did not enter the Dutch Top 40, but peaked at number fifteen on the Tipparade chart, which acts as an extension to the Top 40.)	—	—	Non-album single
"Nacht" with Kraantje Pappie	2020	25	17	—	Deel zoveel
"Was je maar hier"	2020	tip19	—	—	Deel zoveel
"Echte Mannen"	2020	tip15	—	Tip29	Deel zoveel
"Net als dansen"	2021	tip23	—	—	Non-album single
"Hoe dan ook with Acda & De Munnik"	2023	tip8	—	—	Uit het hoofd
"Wat Ik Ook Ga Doen"	2024	—	—	—	Non-album single
"In Oranje"	2024	-	—	—	Non-album single
"Verliefd Zijn with Paul Elstak"	2025	-	—	—	Non-album single
"—" denotes items which were not released in that country or failed to chart.

==== As featured artist ====
Title	Year	Peak chart positions	Album
Title	Year	NL Top 100	Album
"This is a Night (Het is een nacht)" (The Baseballs featuring Guus Meeuwis)	2011	70	Strings 'n' Stripes
"—" denotes items which were not released in that country or failed to chart.

==== Other appearances ====
Title	Year	Peak chart positions		
Title	Year	NL Top 40	NL Top 100	BEL (FLA)
"Als je iets kan doen" (charity single by supergroep Artiesten voor Azië)	2005	1	1	—
"Koningslied" (single by various Dutch artists for the investiture of Willem-Alexander)	2013	2	1	41
"—" denotes items which were not released in that country or failed to chart.
