= Diggy Dex =

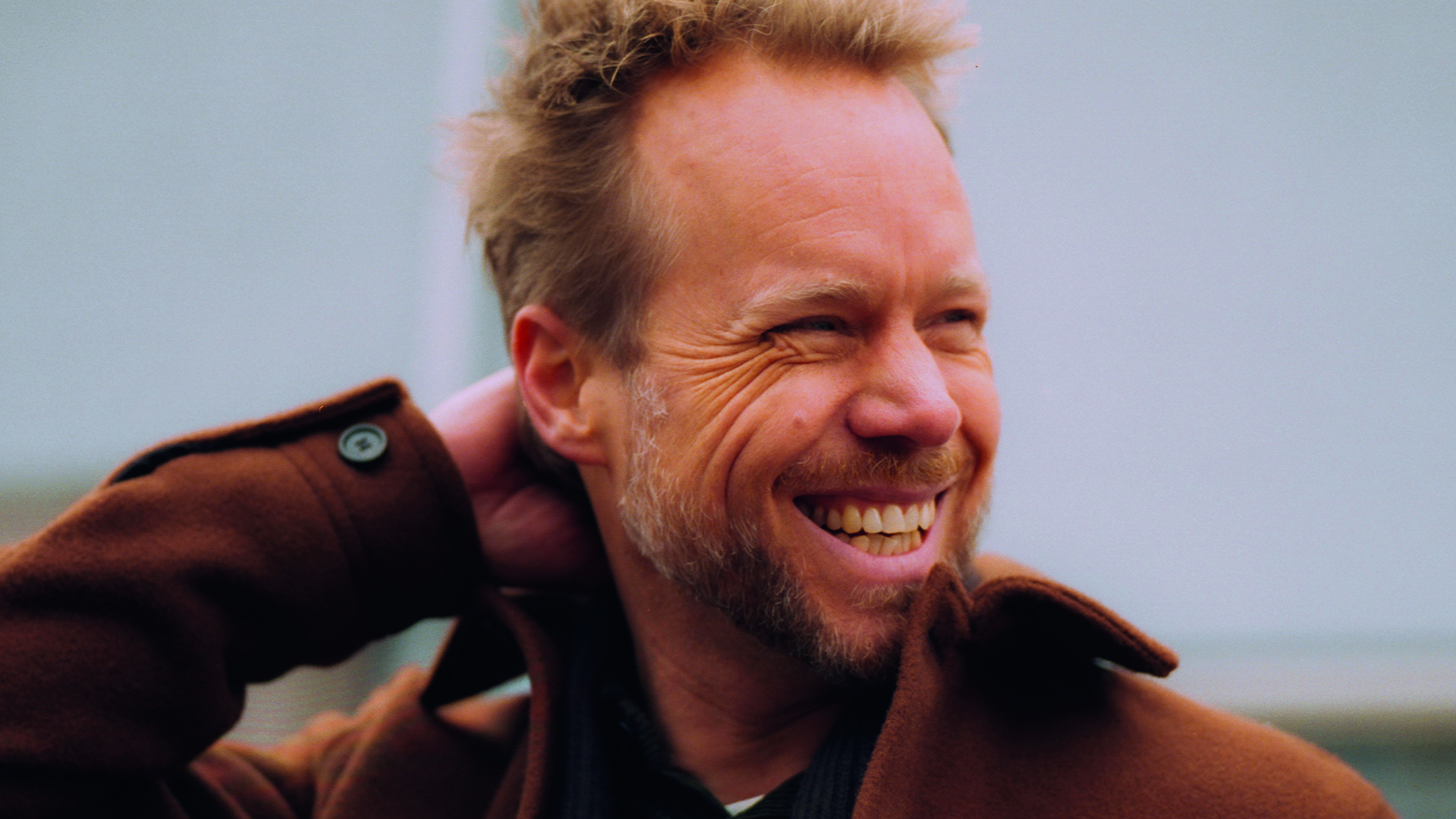

Background information
- Birth name: Koen Jansen
- Born: March 26, 1980 (age 45); Amersfoort, Netherlands
- Genres: Hip hop
- Years active: 1995–present
- Labels: We Want More Music; Noah's Ark
- Formerly of: DAC
- Website: diggydex.nl

Koen Jansen (born 26 March 1980), better known by his stage name Diggy Dex, is a Dutch rapper. He was a member of the rap group De Amersfoortse Coöperatie (D.A.C.) and started in 2006 as a solo artist.

== Life ==
=== Youth ===
Jansen was born in Amersfoort and grew up in the nearby Leusden. He started taking guitar lessons at the age of eleven. His parents divorced when he was around 15. At the age of nineteen, Diggy Dex wrote his first solo track called Zoektocht naar gelukt. After secondary school, Jansen studied social and cultural sciences at the Vrije Universiteit Amsterdam.

=== D.A.C. ===
When Jansen was 15, he was inspired by the Dutch rap group Osdorp Posse. He started freestyling and writing and would form De Profeten together with his friend Bjørn Bergen (nickname Hux B). Soon after, they met another duo from Amersfoort Darin and Glenn (D.A.C., short for Darin and Clenn), who made instrumental beats, with whom they start collaborating. They are later joined by Grootmeester Jan, Wudstik, Jiggy Djé and Mr. Fonc, all from Amersfoort. Together they formed D.A.C., this time short for "De Amersfoortse Coöperatie" (The Amersfoort Cooperative).

The group started to perform, at first mostly school parties. Around 2000, they started releasing songs on the internet as mp3. In 2001, they released the clip De Amersfoortse Pracht and won the Small Price of Amersfoort (Dutch: Kleine Prijs van Amersfoort). They are joined by two new members, drummer Kroes en dj UrbQ. In 2002, they won the people's choice award of the Grote Prijs van Nederland. They released their first album DiDACtici in 2002, of which only 1,000 copies were produced. In 2003, they made a breakthrough with the song Springstof, which is played often on The Box. The increased attention led to concerts on Lowlands and the Uitmarkt. In 2005, they released their second album Professioneel Chillen.

=== Solo career ===
At the age of nineteen, Jansen had written his solo track Zoektocht naar gelukt. After the release of Professioneel Chillen, different members of D.A.C. released solo albums and D.A.C. informally ended. In 2006, Jansen followed with his first solo album Verhalen van de sofa (Stories from the couch). He released his second album Mayonaise voor de ziel in 2008.

In 2009, Jansen released the single Slaap lekker (Fantastig toch), which was a remix of the song Fantastig toch of Belgian singer Eva De Roovere. It became a hit in both the Netherlands and Flanders. In 2010, Jansen released his third album, Lange nachten korte dagen (Long nights short days). In 2014, Jansen released his fourth album, Do It Yourself.

In 2016, Jansen participated in the TV show Ali B op volle toeren, in which he collaborated with Herman van Veen and Boudewijn de Groot. The same year, Jansen released his fifth album, Golven. In 2018, Jansen released his sixth album, Karavaan. He participated in the Beste Zangers in 2020

In 2021, Jansen was part of the Streamers, a group of Dutch artists who held free livestream-concerts during the COVID-19 lockdowns. After the restrictions had been lifted, a few physical concerts were held. Later that year, he released his seventh album, Carroussel.

== Personal life ==
Jansen and his partner have two sons (born 2010 and 2016).

== Discography ==
=== Albums ===
List of albums
| Title | Year | Peak chart positions |
| Title | Year | NLD |
|---|---|---|
| Lange nachten korte dagen | 2010 | 84 |
| Do It Yourself | 2014 | 41 |
| Golven | 2016 | 22 |
| Karavaan | 2018 | 34 |
| Carrousel | 2021 | 84 |
| Tempo Giusto | 2025 | 16 |

=== Singles (as solo artist) ===
List of singles
| Title | Year | Peak chart positions | | |
| Title | Year | NLD 40 | NLD 100 | BEL (FL) |
|---|---|---|---|---|
| "Slaap lekker (Fantastig toch)" (featuring Eva De Roovere) | 2009 | 8 | 2 | 2 |
| "Vandaag" | 2010 | — | 35 | — |
| "Wat doe je dapper" (featuring Anna Drijver) | 2010 | — | 52 | — |
| "Links, rechts" (featuring Wudstik, Big2 & Skiggy Rapz) | 2010 | — | 96 | — |
| "Dezelfde spijt" (featuring Jenny Lane) | 2011 | — | 78 | — |
| "Treur niet (Ode aan het leven)" (featuring JW Roy) | 2015 | 10 | 21 | — |
| "Ik huil alleen bij jou" (with Ali B) | 2016 | 29 | 33 | — |
| "Same Love (Jij blijft)" (with Milow) | 2020 | — | 86 | — |

=== Singles (as songwriter) ===
List of singles which Koen Jansen co-wrote and which charted.
| Title | Artist | Year | Peak chart positions | |
| Title | Artist | Year | NLD 100 | BEL (FL) |
|---|---|---|---|---|
| "Leef" | André Hazes Jr. | 2015 | 93 | 3 |
