= Jan Pijnenburg (drummer) =

Dutch drummer (1955–2026)

- Born: 29 December 1955; Vught, North Brabant, Netherlands
- Died: 12 November 2026 (aged 70) Andalusia, Spain
- Genres: Pop; Rock; Reggae; Ska
- Occupations: Drummer; Session musician
- Instruments: Drums; Percussion
- Formerly of: Doe Maar; Lucifer; Long Tall Ernie and the Shakers; Sweet d'Buster; The Magnificent 7
- Spouse: Angeline van den Berg

Jan Pijnenburg (29 December 1955 – 12 November 2026) was a Dutch drummer and session musician. He became best known as the drummer for the band Doe Maar, in which he played from 1982 to 1984 and with whom he performed again in 2000 and 2008. Furthermore, he worked for a wide range of Dutch and international artists.

== Biography ==
=== Youth and musical education ===
Pijnenburg grew up in a musical family. His mother played classical piano music every day, and his father also played the piano. His father was a businessman and envisaged a future for his eldest son within the family business. From a young age, Pijnenburg became interested in percussion. He practised on empty detergent containers before eventually being able to purchase a Trixon drum kit. He took drum lessons from Manus Cooymans, through whom he also met Manus's brother, the keyboardist Otger Cooymans. By the age of about fourteen, he was playing in a local band that included wind instruments and a bass player.

The song "Sammy" by Ramses Shaffy made a deep impression on him at a young age, both musically and through the sense of recognition he found in the lyrics. A second formative experience was a screening in London of the concert film Mad Dogs & Englishmen (1971), featuring Joe Cocker. The performances of drummers Jim Gordon and Jim Keltner, in particular, along with the high volume at which the music was presented, contributed to his decision to become a professional drummer.

He studied for a time at a conservatory and also taught percussion at music schools in 's-Hertogenbosch and Breda. He also gained experience during jam sessions, including those at the Effenaar in Eindhoven.

=== Early bands and studio recordings ===
Through manager Pieter de Wit, Pijnenburg joined the group Fontessa in the 1970s, which included guitarist Frank van der Kloot. He subsequently worked with Otger Cooymans on the project Otger Dice. On the album Garden of Pleasure (1977), he played drums alongside David Kemper. In Lucifer, the band centred around Margriet Eshuijs, he succeeded Henny Huisman. He played drums and percussion on the album Margriet (1977).

In the late 1970s, he played with Long Tall Ernie and the Shakers during live shows and contributed to the album Meet the Monsters (1979). He was also for a short while a member of Sweet d'Buster.

Together with musicians including Cooymans, guitarist Carl Carlton, and singer Tony Vandenberg, Pijnenburg played in the rock band Hollander. The album Side Kicks (1980) was recorded at various locations, including The Hit Factory in New York.

After this, he played for some time in the German rock band Gebrüder Engel. During his stay in Hamburg, he received a telephone call from Ernst Jansz, who invited him to audition for Doe Maar. Pijnenburg travelled to Tilburg and was hired.

=== Doe Maar (1982–1984) ===
In May 1982, Pijnenburg replaced René van Collem as the drummer for Doe Maar; before that, Carel Copier had been the group's drummer. After only one performance, Pijnenburg was involved in a serious traffic collision. He sustained severe injuries and required a long period of rehabilitation. Van Collem temporarily returned to the band. Pijnenburg was able to return to the drum kit in January 1983, although he continued to undergo corrective surgeries thereafter.

Owing to the traffic collision, Pijnenburg missed the recording sessions for several Doe Maar classics. The single "De bom" (1982) was recorded using a drum machine. For the studio album 4us (1983), recorded in November and December 1982, Doe Maar also made use of a drum machine, alongside drum parts played by René van Collem.

From 1983 onwards, Pijnenburg served as the permanent drummer for Doe Maar, becoming part of the lineup that performed live and appeared on television and in promotional photographs. For instance, on 5 April 1983, he featured in a television special designed by Jaap Drupsteen, in which the band performed playback versions of songs including "De bom," "Nachtzuster," and "Pa."

In May 1983, Pijnenburg performed with Doe Maar during "Een gebaar," a benefit event for Amnesty International held at the Koninklijk Theater Carré. He had not yet fully recovered by that time. In June 1983, live recordings were made that appeared later that year on the double album Lijf aan lijf, with Pijnenburg as the drummer.

At the end of 1983, Doe Maar began work on a fifth studio album. During the recording sessions in February 1984, the group decided to break up, leaving the album unfinished. In 1984, three more tracks were released featuring Pijnenburg on drums: "Macho" (with "Grote broer" as the B-side) and "Wat ze doet," which appeared on the compilation album 5 jaar – Het complete overzicht. His contribution to Doe Maar’s studio recordings remained relatively limited, despite his prominent role as their live drummer.

Pijnenburg regretted the decision to stop and had wanted to further develop the band's musical possibilities. On 14 April 1984, Doe Maar gave two farewell concerts at the Maaspoort in 's-Hertogenbosch. The recording of these concerts was released in 1995 on the album Het Afscheidsconcert.

=== International collaborations and The Magnificent Seven ===
After the breakup of Doe Maar, Pijnenburg was active as a backing and session drummer. He toured for about two years with the Belgian musician Luc Van Acker and subsequently worked with Blaine L. Reininger, known for his work with Tuxedomoon. With Reininger, he performed in various European countries.

Pijnenburg also played in the backing band for the Belgian singer Jo Lemaire. Among other performances, he appeared with her at the Belga Live Festival in Ostend on 24 July 1987, an event that also featured Tina Turner on the bill. Pijnenburg also played in Coopertest, a fusion group centred around saxophonist Jan Kooper.

Together with his former Doe Maar colleague Henny Vrienten and fellow musicians Joost Belinfante, Jan Kooper, and Jakob Klaasse, all of whom were also associated with Doe Maar, Pijnenburg performed in The Magnificent Seven, a group that included artists such as Fay Lovsky. This music-theatre ensemble created arrangements of material including film and television scores. On the album The Best of the Worst (1990), Pijnenburg played drums and percussion, and also contributed vocals. He also contributed to Vrienten’s solo album Mijn Hart Slaapt Nooit (1991) and to projects by artists including Herman Brood.

=== Work outside music and Doe Maar's return ===
In the 1990s, Pijnenburg worked for about five years as a freelance video editor for television channels and production companies. His editing work included De Woestijn Leeft, a programme for the channel AT5 created by Theo van Gogh and featuring Max Pam and Jeroen Henneman. Later, he spent some time running a poster shop in Uden.

For the Doe Maar reunion in 2000, Pijnenburg once again took his place behind the drum kit. He played on the album Klaar, which also features drumming contributions from René van Collem and Mark Stoop. The group performed sixteen sold-out concerts at Rotterdam Ahoy. The preparations for the reunion and the concerts were followed in the documentary "Alles doet 't nog" (2000).

In 2008, Doe Maar reunited for a series of performances, including two sold-out concerts at De Kuip on 10 and 12 July. The last concert of this series also marked Pijnenburg's last performance with the group. Although Doe Maar reunited several times thereafter, Pijnenburg did not return as drummer. For the next reunion, René van Collem once again took his place behind the drum kit.

=== Living in Spain ===
About 2002, Pijnenburg moved to Andalusia with his wife, journalist Angeline van den Berg. They bought a run-down farmhouse in the mountains and, over the course of about ten years, renovated it into a largely self-sufficient complex featuring a main residence, guest apartments, a swimming pool, and a recording studio.

The plan for a combined living and music space fulfilled a childhood wish, a desire partly inspired by a story he had heard about The Beatles' plans for a communal living and studio complex. In Spain, he handled recordings, organized concerts, and provided sound engineering for performing musicians. By 2026, he was working on a manuscript containing recollections of his life and musical career.

=== Death ===
Pijnenburg, however, died unexpectedly in his sleep in Spain that same year, on 12 November, at the age of 70.

== Musical style and influences ==
Pijnenburg played various genres, including rock and roll, pop, reggae, ska, and experimental music. He viewed himself as first and foremost a session musician capable of adapting to a wide range of musical settings. His influences included Jim Gordon, Jim Keltner, and Ricky Fataar. In his own playing, he placed great importance on timing, ensemble interaction, and self-confidence.

During his collaboration with Blaine L. Reininger, Pijnenburg worked with elements such as programmed bass parts, which required a tight and restrained rhythmic approach.

== Selected discography ==
Year	Artist or group	Record	Contribution
1977	Otger Dice	Garden of Pleasure	Drums, along with David Kemper
1977	Lucifer	Margriet	Drums and percussion
1979	Long Tall Ernie and the Shakers	Meet the Monsters	Drums
1980	Hollander	Side Kicks	Drums
1983	Doe Maar	Lijf aan lijf	Drums (live)
1984	Doe Maar	Macho (single)	Drums
1987	Blaine L. Reininger	Rolf and Florian Go Hawaiian (Remix) (single)	Drums
1990	The Magnificent Seven	The Best of the Worst	Drums, percussion, and vocals
1990	Jan De Wilde	Hè Hè	Drums
1991	Henny Vrienten	Mijn Hart Slaapt Nooit	Drums
1995	Doe Maar	Het Afscheidsconcert	Drums and vocals (live recording from 1984)
2000	Doe Maar	Klaar	Drums (along with René van Collem and Mark Stoop)
2000	Doe Maar	Hees van Ahoy	Drums (live)
2005	Harry Niehof	Altied Onderwegens	Drums
