= Henny Huisman =

Dutch television presenter

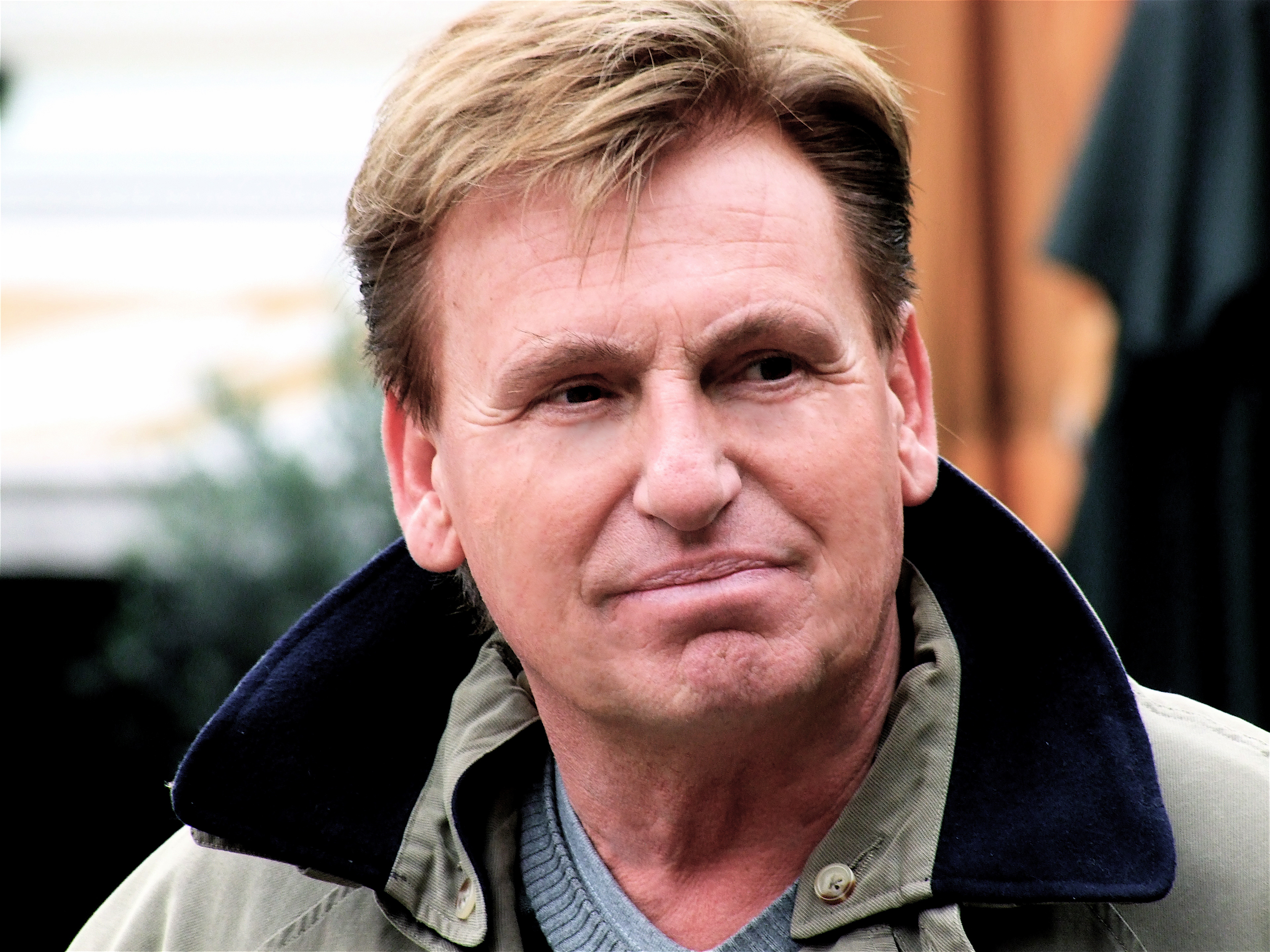
- Born: Hendrikus Josephus Huisman; 18 July 1951 (age 74); Zaandam, Netherlands
- Partner: Lia van Gulik
- Children: Nikki and Lobke
- Website: www.hennyhuisman.nl

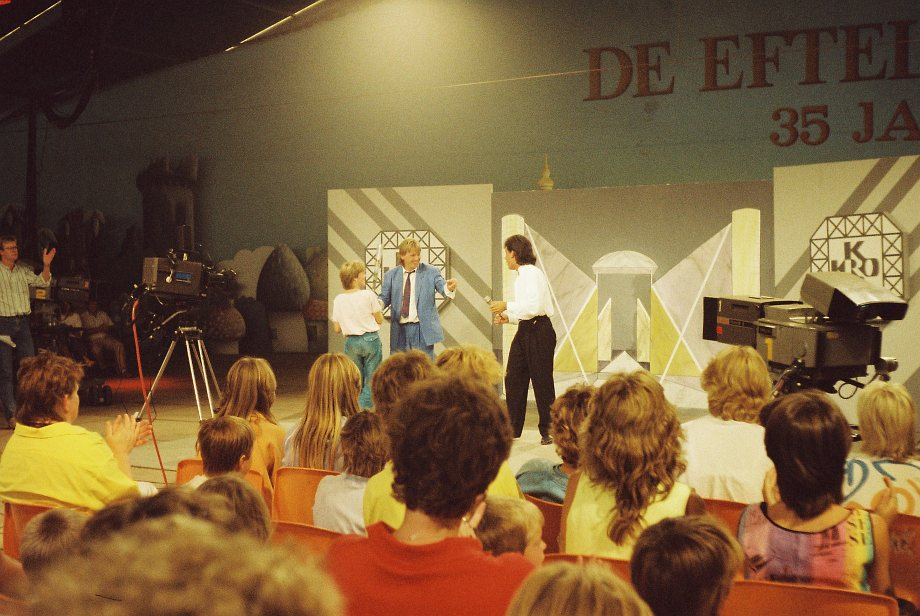
Henny Huisman during TV recordings in the Efteling in 1986

Hendrikus Josephus Huisman (born 18 June 1951) is a Dutch television presenter and musician.

== Biography ==
Huisman had a catholic upbringing. Originally trained as a window dresser, he was a drummer, DJ and event host before he enrolled in the world of television.

Huisman began his music career in 1961 as a 10-year-old member of guitar-trio The Bright Stars alongside Margriet Eshuijs. After a spell with teenage-band The Marileens he moved on to bigger things. Huisman co-founded Lucifer in which he played drums while Eshuijs performed lead vocals; he made his television-debut on March 18, 1975, appearing on Van Oekel's Discohoek (a parody of chart-show TopPop). Huisman left Lucifer after the success of House for sale and was replaced with Jan Pijnenburg, future drummer of pop/reggae-band Doe Maar. Huisman formed the short-lived spin-off group Match and became an award-winning dj at discotheques. He began to incorporate a lip-synch contest which was converted into a TV-format in 1983 after he was discovered by producer Joop van den Ende. The Playbackshow evolved into Soundmixshow and gave rise to offshoots starring children, elderly and celebrities. Soundmixshow was sold to Britain as Stars in their Eyes, and in reverse Huisman presented the Dutch version of Cilla Black's Surprise Surprise (Surpriseshow). Huisman originally made these programmes for KRO, in 1989 he was transferred to RTL 4.

From 2003 till 2009 Huisman worked for evengalical broadcaster EO; he documented his quest for God in a series of interviews with converts and ended up embracing christianity. In 2005 he welcomed guests at his holiday-resort on Bonaire in Huize Huisman. From 2007 till 2009 Huisman hosted Korenslag, the Dutch version of Last Choir Standing. During that same period, he was a judge on Steracteur Sterartiest, the Flemish version of Soapstar Superstar, aired on VRT 1.

Eind 2007 en begin 2008 was hij actief in België, als jurylid in het tv-programma Steracteur Sterartiest op de Vlaamse openbare omroep VRT.

Following a cancer-battle, Huisman made his comeback in 2014 on SBS6 for two seasons worth of Surpriseshows; difference was that he had become a co-host on his own show which was renamed Surprise Surprise.

In 2019, Huisman was given an item in talkshow Veronica Inside to visit the ones who were offended by the hosts.

On March 6, 2020, Huisman returned to SBS6, this time as presenter of Waar is dat Feestje?.
