= Lucifer (Dutch band) =

Dutch pop band

Lucifer was a Dutch pop group formed in the early 1970s. The band consisted of singer and organist Margriet Eshuijs, bassist Dick Bujisman, drummer Henry Huisman and singer/percussionist Julio Wilson.

In 1974, Lucifer signed a recording contract with EMI, marking the beginning of their professional recording career. The following year, the group achieved mainstream success with the single "House for Sale", which became their most commercially successful release and received significant airplay in the Netherlands, peaking at number 4 on the Dutch Top 40.

Although the band continued to perform and record, they struggled to replicate the success of their breakthrough hit. As a result, the group gradually faded from the mainstream music scene. Following Lucifer's decline, Margriet Eshuijs pursued a solo career and became a prominent figure in Dutch pop music, releasing several albums and continuing to perform as a solo artist. Drummer Jan Pijnenburg, who had replaced Huisman, went on to play for Long Tall Ernie and the Shakers and Doe Maar, among others.

== Discography ==
=== Studio albums ===
- As We Are (1975, EMI)
- Margriet (1977, EMI)
