= Doris Day (disambiguation) =

Doris Day (1922–2019) was an American actress and singer.

Doris Day may also refer to:

- "Doris Day" (song), a song by Doe Maar
- Doris E. Day (1873–1966), British archer
- Jim Gray (UDA member) or Doris Day (1958–2005), loyalist paramilitary
- Doris Day (actress, born 1910) (1910–1998), American actress
