= Skunk (album) =

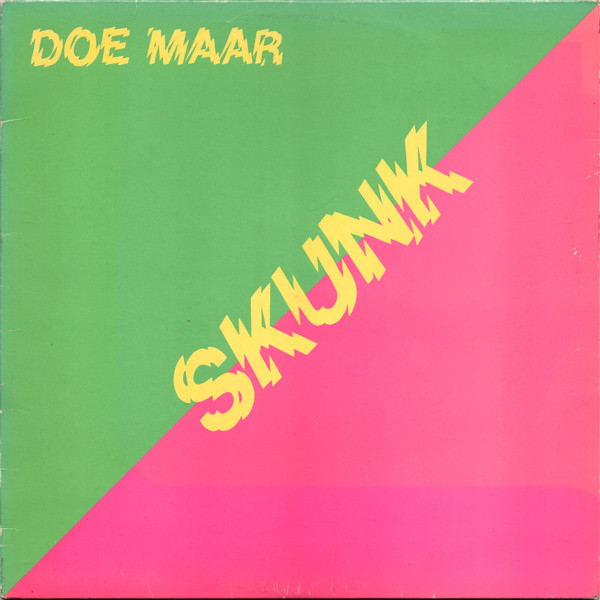

Studio album by Doe Maar
- Released: March 1981
- Genres: Nederpop, ska, punk
- Length: 37:19

Doe Maar chronology
Doe Maar (1979)	Skunk (1981)	Doris Day en andere Stukken (1983)

Skunk is the second studio album by Dutch band Doe Maar. It was released in 1981. The single "Sinds 1 dag of 2 (32 jaar)" was the band's first top 40 hit in the Netherlands. The title is a portmanteau of "ska" and "punk".

== Personnel ==
Adapted from Ernst Jansz's website.

- Carel Copier - drums, vocals
- Jan Hendriks - guitar, vocals
- Ernst Jansz - keyboard, vocals
- Henny Vrienten - bass, vocals
- Joost Belinfante - horns, harmonica, noseflute, vocals

== Track listing ==
Side 1
No.	Title	Writer(s)	Length
1.	"Sinds 1 dag of 2 (32 jaar)"	Henny Vrienten	3:18
2.	"Te Laat"	Carel Copier	2:01
3.	"Bella donna" (Instrumental)	Jan Hendriks	3:13
4.	"Smoorverliefd"	Henny Vrienten	3:15
5.	"Nederwiet"	Joost Belinfante	6:52

Side 2
No.	Title	Writer(s)	Length
1.	"Nix voor Jou"	Joost Belinfante, Carel Copier	4:06
2.	"Mis"	Ernst Jansz	2:52
3.	"Rumah Saya"	Ernst Jansz	4:04
4.	"De Laastse X"	Henny Vrienten	4:53
5.	"Dansen Met Alice"	Ernst Jansz	2:45
