= Doe Maar (album) =

Studio album by Doe Maar
- Released: 1979
- Genres: Nederpop, Ska, Reggae
- Length: 38:03
- Labels: Killroy, Telstar
- Producers: Ernst Jansz, Peter Vincent

Doe Maar chronology
Doe Maar (1979)	Skunk (1981)

Doe Maar was the first studio album by Dutch band Doe Maar. It was released in 1979, and was less successful than the band's later albums. A contemporary reviewer from Muziek Expres wrote "Ik zie niet in dat deze groep een positieve bijdrage zal leveren aan de toekomst van de (Nederlandstalige) popmuziek." (transl. "I do not see that this group will be a positive influence on the future of [Dutch] pop music.")

== Track listing ==
Side 1
No.	Title	Writer(s)	Length
1.	"Anita"	Ernst Jansz	3:28
2.	"Whiskey Coke"	Piet Dekker	2:08
3.	"Wees Niet Bang Voor Mijn Lul"	Ernst Jansz	2:12
4.	"Je Liet Me Staan"	Piet Dekker	2:19
5.	"Verdomme, Ik Doe Het Wel Alleen"	Ernst Jansz, Piet Dekker	2:04
6.	"Hé, Hé"	Ernst Jansz	4:39
7.	"Repelsteel"	Ernst Jansz, Jan Hendriks	1:28

Side 2
No.	Title	Writer(s)	Length
1.	"Ik Zou Het Willen Doen"	Ernst Jansz	3:07
2.	"Als De Morgen Komt"	Carel Copier, Ernst Jansz	4:26
3.	"Politiekman"	Ernst Jansz	2:56
4.	"Regen"	Ernst Jansz	3:10
5.	"Het Leven Gaat Door / Er Verandert Niks"	Ernst Jansz	3:01
6.	"Karneval"	Zeth Mustamu, Ernst Jansz	2:14

== Personnel ==
Credits adapted from Ernst Jansz's official website.

- Piet Dekker - bass guitar, vocals
- Ernst Jansz - keyboard, steel drum, clarinet, vocals
- Jan Hendriks - guitar, ukulele, vocals
- Carel Copier - drums, flute, percussion, vocals
- Sjeng Kraft - accordion
- Evert Hekkema - trumpet
- Nippy Noya - percussion
- Zeth Mustamu - percussion
- Patricia Maessen - backing vocals
- Stella Maessen - backing vocals

== Charts ==
Chart (2022)	Peak position
Belgian Albums (Ultratop Flanders)	153
Dutch Albums (Album Top 100)	70
