= De nietsnut =

1992 Dutch television film

- Directed by: Ab van Ieperen
- Based on: De nietsnut by Frans Kellendonk
- Produced by: Shooting Star
- Music by: Henny Vrienten
- Release date: 1992
- Running time: 90 minutes
- Country: Netherlands
- Language: Dutch

De nietsnut is a 1992 Dutch television movie directed by Ab van Ieperen.

== Production ==
The film's script is based on the 1979 novel De nietsnut by Frans Kellendonk, who collaborated on a screenplay for the novel in the 1980s. After Kellendonk's death, Ab van Ieperen produced the screenplay.

The production was controversial, involving a disagreement between the director and the production company.

== Cast ==
- Pierre Bokma as Frans
- Jacques Bonnaffé
- Marjon Brandsma
- Hugo Maerten as Lifter
- Willem Nijholt
- Ramses Shaffy
- Rik van Uffelen
- Manouk van der Meulen
