= Henny Vrienten =

Dutch musician (1948–2022)

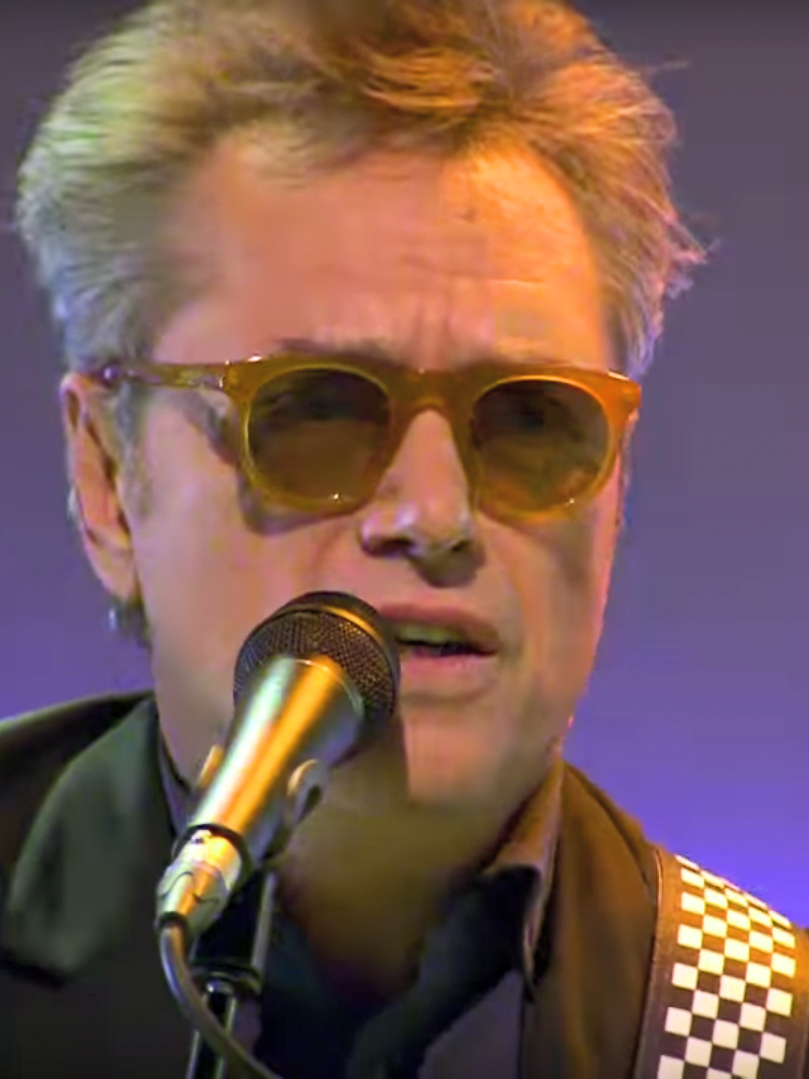
- Vrienten in 2017

Background information
- Born: 27 July 1948; Hilvarenbeek, Netherlands
- Died: 25 April 2022 (aged 73) Diepenheim, Netherlands
- Genres: Ska, film score
- Occupations: Singer; musician; composer
- Instruments: Vocals; bass
- Years active: 1960s–2022
- Formerly of: Doe Maar, the Magnificent 7
- Spouse: Gala Veldhoen (m. 2001)

Henny Vrienten (27 July 1948 – 25 April 2022) was a Dutch musician best known as the singer and bassist of the popular 1980s ska pop band Doe Maar. He also composed music for television and film.

== Biography ==
=== Early days ===
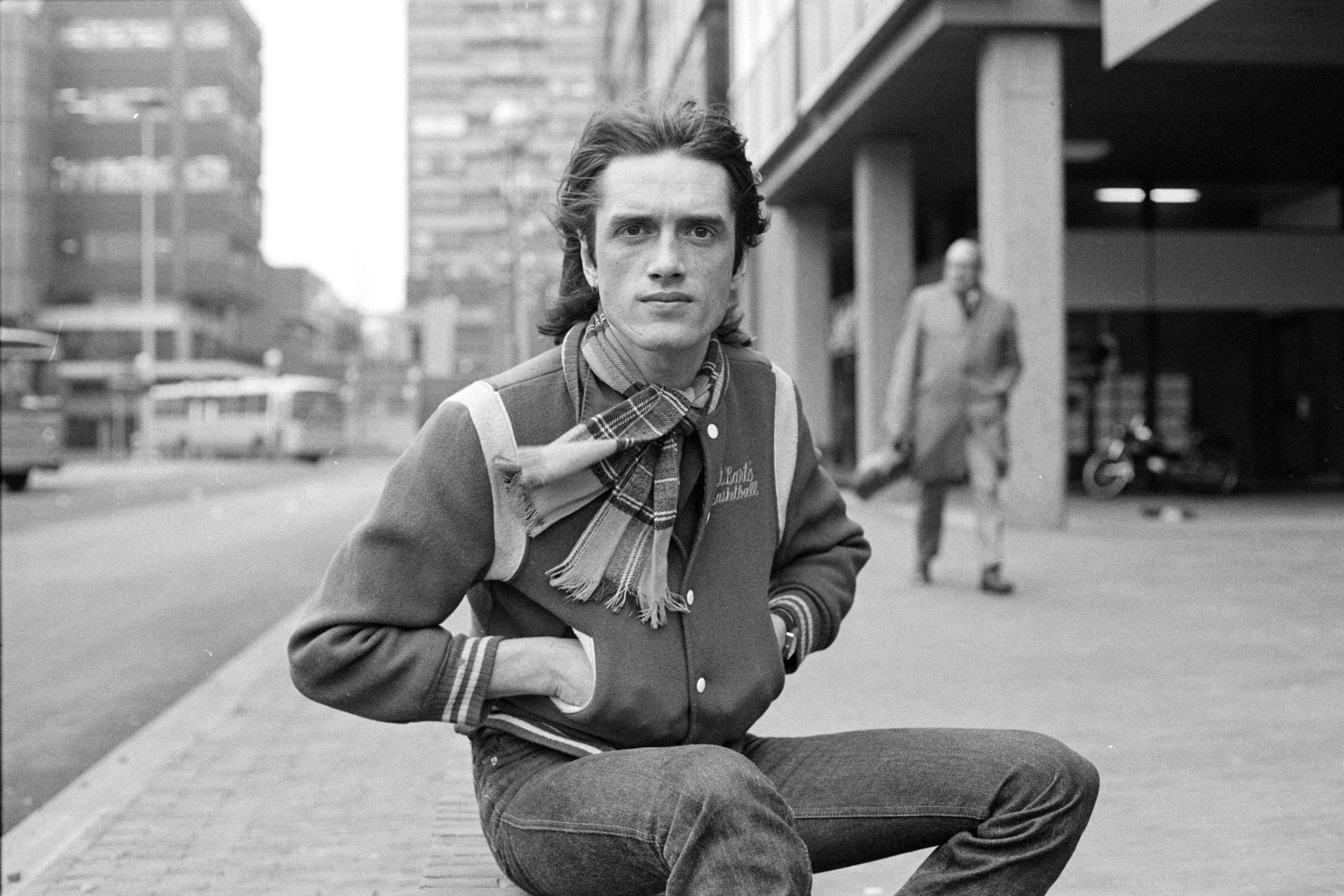
Paul Santos, 1977

Vrienten began his career in the late 1960s as a member of the local outfit Les Cruches. In the early 1970s, he wrote songs for others and released his first single as Ruby Carmichael. In 1977, Vrienten released his debut solo album, Paul Santos, which he recorded with US producer Tom Salisbury. "Lift Me Up Higher" was extracted as a single.

Also in the 1970s, he began working with singer-songwriter Boudewijn de Groot in the studio and on stage. While recording the 1975 album Waar ik woon en wie ik ben, Vrienten met keyboard player Ernst Jansz and drummer Johnny Lodewijks. The latter suggested they form a reggae band. The Rumbones, led by the vocals of Frenchman Cris Lester, toured from October to November 1977 and split up immediately after. Vrienten moved on to Sammie America's Gasphetti, recorded demos at his garage, and did another tour with De Groot.

=== Doe Maar: 1980–84 ===
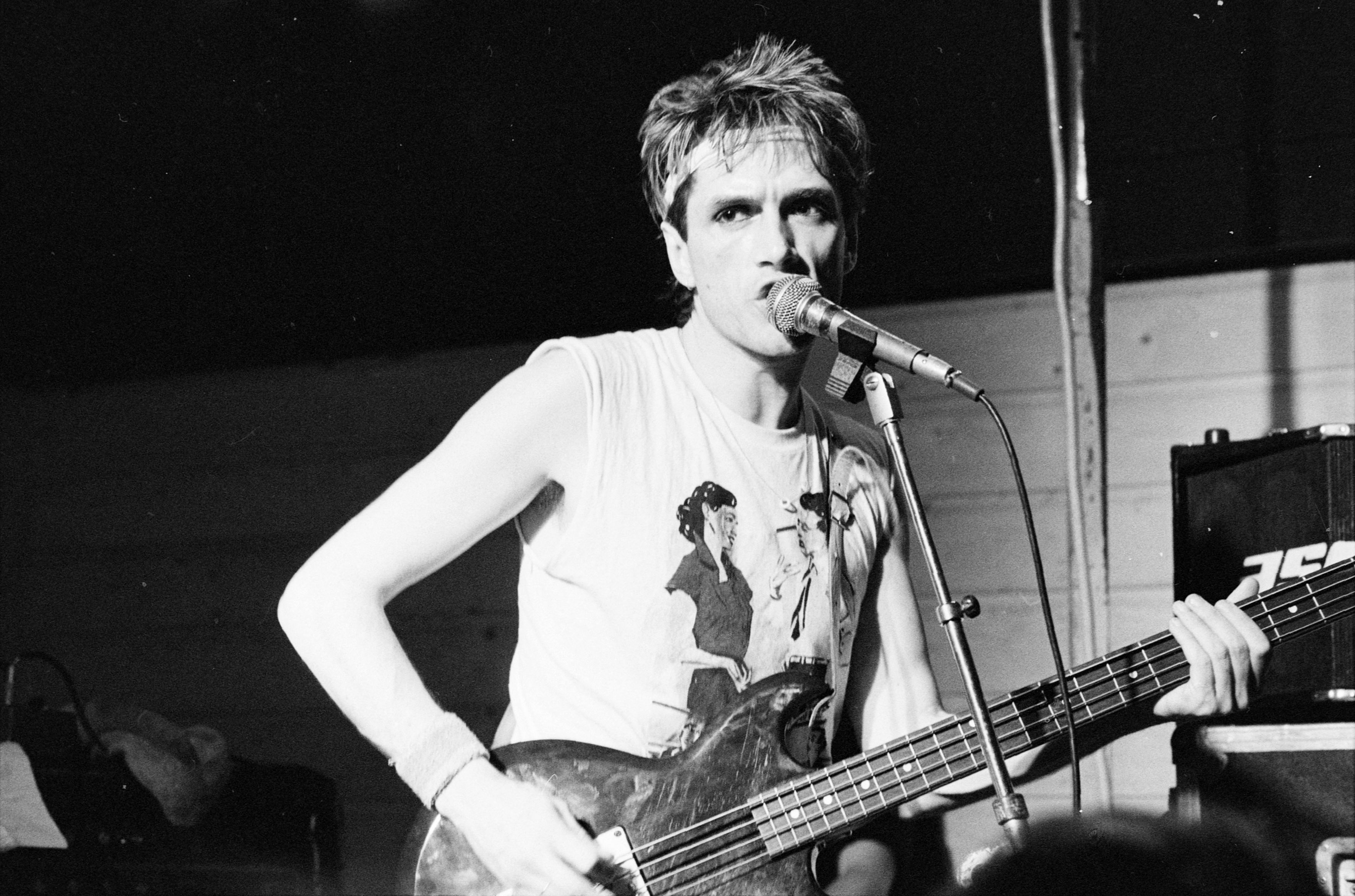
Doe Maar, 1982

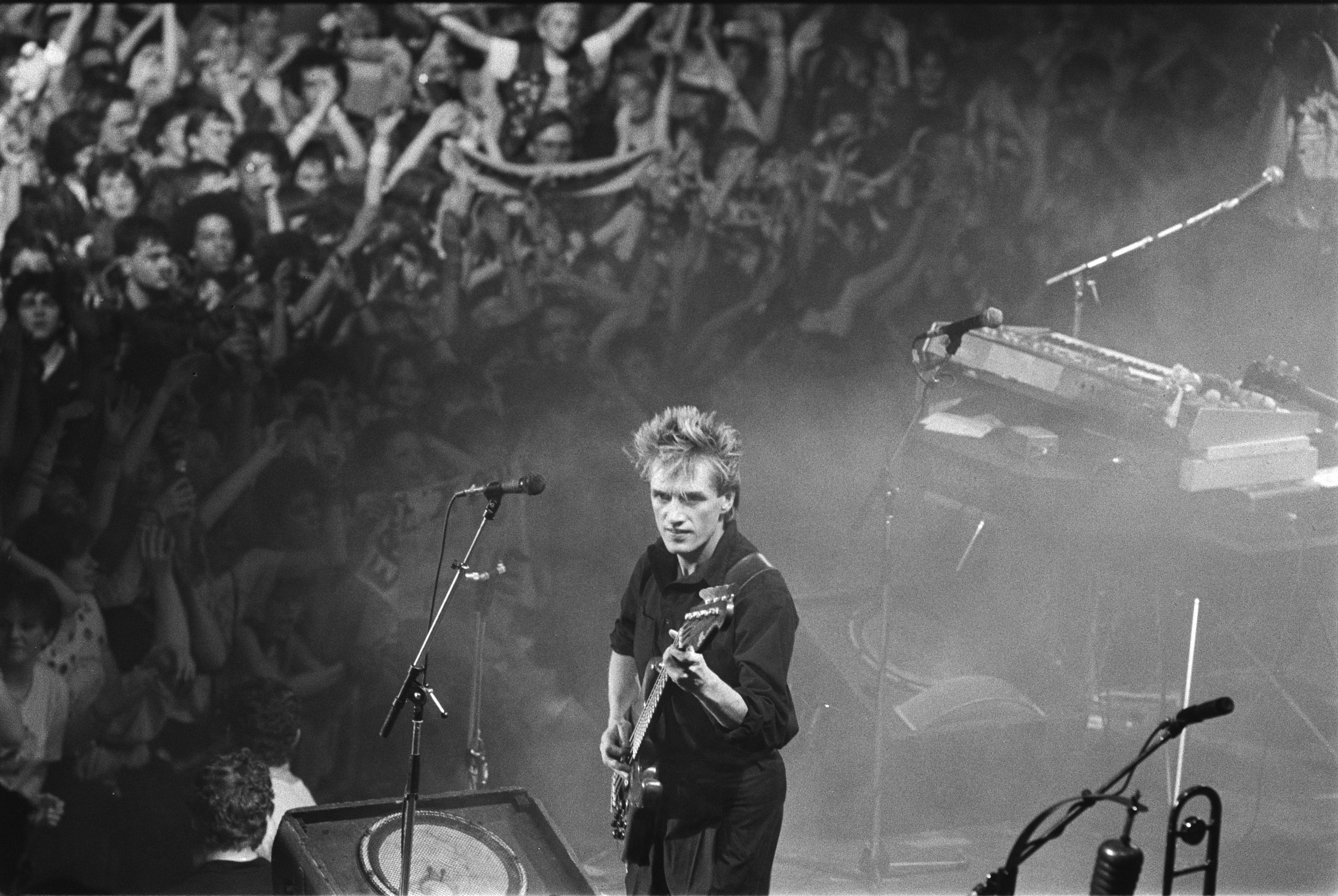
Farewell concert, 1984

Subsequently, Jansz asked Vrienten to join his band Doe Maar, but the songwriter declined, thinking that a Dutch-language group playing for fun would not survive. In 1980, however, he changed his mind. Vrienten joined Doe Maar in time for the recording of their second album, Skunk. He delivered three songs and co-designed the green/pink sleeve as the band's trademark colours.

The record was belatedly released in March 1981. The lead single, "32 Jaar", became a hit. The follow-up, "Smoorverliefd", missed the Top 40, but with the 1982-released "Doris Day", Doe Maar broke through and become key figures of the New Dutch Wave explosion. Initially, they enjoyed their newfound popularity, but six months down the line, doubts started to creep in.

In March 1983, by which time the fourth album, 4us, was released, the band temporarily retreated from publicity. This completely backfired, as Doe Maar-mania grew even bigger.

In between tours of Belgium and the Netherlands Antilles, Vrienten recorded his first Dutch-language solo album and second overall, Geen Ballade, which he released in March 1984, a few weeks before Doe Maar played two farewell shows for the live broadcast.

Instead of embarking on a solo tour, Vrienten decided to explore new territory: he wrote TV and film scores, including for the Dutch Sesame Street, and produced music for other artists.

=== Solo career ===
From 1986 to 1991, Vrienten played oldies like "Teddy Bear's Picknick" with Magnificent Seven, whose members included singer/advert composer Fay Lovsky and unofficial fifth Doe Maar member, Joost Belinfante.

A new solo album was planned but held back by the release of a best-of album. The expected Doe Maar revival never happened, and in early 1992, Mijn Hart Slaapt Nooit, Vrienten's third studio record, was released. As with Geen Ballade, the album received minimal promotion. At the end of the year, all Doe Maar members reunited to support the 1960s outfit CCC Inc., which featured Ernst Jansz and Joost Belinfante, at their 25th-anniversary concert.

In the mid-1990s, a new generation of Dutch-language acts emerged, and Henny ended up collaborating with rap group Osdorp Posse.

=== Doe Maar: the reunion: 1999 ===
In 1999, the four-piece rock band BLØF spent a whole tour playing Doe Maar tribute shows. Doe Maar members attended the show at the Amsterdam Paradiso and on 1 November 1999, they announced their reunion for one last album and a 25-date tour of the Netherlands and Belgium, consisting of eight club shows, a record-breaking sixteen-night residency at the Rotterdam Ahoy, and a stadium show at the Antwerp Sportpaleis. The album Klaar was released in April 2000; the band were finally acknowledged by the pop critics who had previously criticized them for singing in Dutch.

=== Further work: 2000–2022 ===
In 2008, Vrienten recorded an album with contemporaries Frank Boeijen and Henk Hofstede (frontman of the Nits), titled Aardige jongens. They promoted it with a theatre tour.

In 2010, Vrienten appeared in Ali B op volle toeren, a programme in which young Dutch rappers exchange songs with established artists. He contributed "32 Jaar Later", a sequel to the song that gave Doe Maar their first top 40 hit in 1981.

In 2014 and 2015, he released two solo albums and went on tour, accompanied by his son Xander (Jett Rebel's bass-player at the time) and the three-piece rock band My Baby.

In 2016, Vrienten formed the supergroup Vreemde Kostgangers with Golden Earring guitarist George Kooymans and Boudewijn de Groot. They released two albums in 2017 and toured until March 2020 with a setlist of collaborative songs and solo material.

In 2019, Vrienten and his son appeared in a self-made documentary on bass players, a sequel to 2013's Gitaarjongens, which explored the joy of playing guitar. The two became the artists-in-residence on the talk show De Wereld Draait Door during its final season. A new solo album, Tussen de Regels, was released at the end of September.

In 2021, the Doe Maar farewell tour was cancelled due to Vrienten's ill health.

On 25 April 2022 Henny Vrienten died of lung cancer at the age of 73.

== Discography ==
=== Solo ===
- Paul Santos (1977)
- Geen ballade (1984)
- Mijn hart slaapt nooit (1991)
- Nacht – De soundtrack (2006)
- Aardige jongens (2008)
- En toch... (2014)
- Alles is anders (2015)
- Tussen de regels (2019)

=== Studio albums with Doe Maar ===
- Skunk (Doe Maar) (1981)
- Doris Day en andere Stukken (1982)
- 4us (1983)
- Klaar (Doe Maar) (2000)

=== Live albums with Doe Maar ===
- Lijf aan lijf (1983)
- Het afscheidsconcert – Live in de Maaspoort 's-Hertogenbosch (1995)
- Hees van Ahoy (2000)
- Symphonica in Rosso (Doe Maar) (2012)

=== Dub albums ===
- Doe de dub (dub version of the Doe Maar album Doris Day & andere stukken – 1982)
- Hot Dub (dub version of the album Bamboo reggae by Chris Hinze – 1984)

=== Raymond Van Het Groenewoud ===
- Habba (1985)

=== The Magnificent 7 ===
- The Best of the Worst (1990)

=== Vreemde Kostgangers ===
- Vreemde Kostgangers (2017)
- Nachtwerk (2017)

=== Soundtracks ===
==== Film ====
- De prooi (film) (1985)
- In de schaduw van de overwinning (1986)
- The Vanishing (Spoorloos, 1986)
- Jan Rap en z'n maat (film) (1989)
- De Gulle Minnaar (1990)
- De nietsnut (1992)
- The Three Best Things in Life (De Drie Beste Dingen in het Leven, 1992)
- Part Time God (1993)
- Oeroeg (1993)
- Max (1994)
- Sur Place (1996)
- Dying to Go Home (1996)
- Left Luggage (1998)
- Scratches in the Table (Madelief, krassen in het tafelblad, 1998)
- The Flying Liftboy (Abeltje, 1998)
- Little Crumb (Kruimeltje, 1999)
- De Verlossing (2001)
- The Discovery of Heaven (2001)
- La balsa de piedra (2002)
- Peter Bell: The Movie (Pietje Bell: De Film, 2002)
- Sea of Silence (Verder dan de maan, 2003)
- Peter Bell II: The Hunt for the Czar Crown (Pietje Bell 2: De Jacht op de Tsarenkroon, 2003)
- Sonny Boy (2011)
- Time of My Life (Tot altijd, 2012)
- Everybody Happy (2016)

==== Television ====
- Drie Recht, één averecht (1988)
- De Vereenigde Algemeene (1992)
- Kongo (1997)
- Unit 13 (1997–98)
- Het Klokhuis (1999)
- Sesamstraat (1999)
- De Geheime dienst (2000)
- Het Sinterklaasjournaal (2001)
- Ernstige Delicten (2002–04)
- Petticoat (2016)

==== Theater ====
- Ciske de Rat (musical) (2007–09)
