= Hank the Knife and the Jets =

Dutch rock band

- Genres: Rock and roll revival
- Years active: 1974–
- Past members: Henk Bruysten (d. 2024) (vocals, 6-string bass); Alan Pierre Beek (d. 2009) (vocals, guitar); Jan van Haaften (vocals, guitar); Rob Mijnhart (drums); Hans van Geffen (d. 2006) (guitar)

Hank the Knife and the Jets was a Dutch rock and roll band, most famous for its hit single "Guitar King".

== History ==
The band was founded in 1974 in Arnhem by bassist Henk Bruysten, who had recently left Long Tall Ernie and the Shakers, as Moment Darling, and the band changed its name to Hank the Knife and the Jets that same year. The line-up at that time consisted of Henk Bruysten, Alan Pierre Beek, Jan van Haaften, Rob Mijnhart, and Hans van Geffen (guitar).

The band had its greatest success in its home country, recording five top 40 hits on the Dutch singles charts between 1975 and 1980, including the number 1 hit "Stan the Gunman".

The band performed "Guitar King" on the 22 September 1977 edition of Top of the Pops, although the single did not make the UK singles charts - it was number 9 in the Star Breakers chart (for songs "bubbling under" outside the official top 50) for the week ending 24 September 1977.

Henk Bruysten, the only remaining founding member of the band died on 28 December 2024.

== Chart appearances ==
=== Albums ===
Year	Song	NL	DE
1975	Guitar King	–	39
1980	Crazy Guitar	45	–
2018	The Golden Years of Dutch Pop Music	95	–
"—" denotes releases that did not chart.

=== Singles ===
Year	Song	NL	BE	DE	UK
1975	"Guitar King"	2	3	4	59
1975	"Stan the Gunman"	1	8	9	–
1976	"Yesterday Star"	14	–	38	–
1976	"Crazy Cat"	31	–	–	–
1980	"Crazy Guitar"	8	9	–	–
"—" denotes releases that did not chart.
