= Doris Day (song) =

1982 song by Doe Maar

Single by Doe Maar

from the album Doris Day en andere stukken
- B-side: "Winnetoe"
- Released: 1982
- Genre: Nederpop, ska
- Length: 3:48
- Label: Killroy
- Songwriter: Henny Vrienten

Doe Maar singles chronology
"Smoorverliefd" (1981)	"Doris Day" (1982)	"Is dit alles" (1982)

"Doris Day" is a 1982 single by the Dutch ska band Doe Maar. It was the title track off their third album, Doris Day en andere stukken (nl), and became their first top-ten hit. The song was written by vocalist and bass player Henny Vrienten, and it catapulted the band to sudden stardom.

== Charts ==
Chart (1982)	Peak position
Netherlands (Single Top 100)	9
