= Long Tall Ernie and the Shakers =

Dutch rock band

Long Tall Ernie & The Shakers
- Genre: Rock and roll revival
- Years active: 1972–82

Long Tall Ernie and the Shakers was a Dutch rock and roll revivalist band successful in the 1970s.

== History ==
The band was born out of the Arnhem rock group Moan (formerly The Moans) in 1972 as a joke - members of Moan would return to the stage after shows dressed in fifties clothing and playing rock & roll under the Long Tall Ernie name. Founder member Hank Bruysten left the band in 1974 to form the similarly-themed Hank the Knife and the Jets. Tony Britnell, who joined in 1975, was the only non-Dutch member, having formerly played with Birmingham band The Fortunes and Coventry's Jigsaw.

The band had a number of hit singles in the Dutch singles charts, including ten making the Dutch top 40. Its biggest success was "Do You Remember", a medley of fifties hits, linked by the band's own musical passages, which spent 4 weeks at number 1 in 1977. The parent album of the same name made number 3 in the Dutch compilation album charts. (The band's only album which made the national charts was a retrospective - The Golden Years Of Dutch Pop Music - which reached number 65 in 2015.)

The success of the single gained the band a performance on Top Of The Pops in January 1978. Despite this, it did not make the UK charts, with future television appearances stymied by a Musicians' Union rule requiring a similar opportunity in the Netherlands for a British act. The single reached number 22 in the Melody Maker disco charts in December 1977, and number 14 in the Music Week equivalent. Lead singer Arnie Treffers appeared on an Elvis Presley tribute single, "Don't Cry For Christmas" on the Sun Records label, credited simply as "?", released in the UK at the same time. "Do You Remember" also spent 4 weeks on top of the Ultratop 50 Singles (Flanders) October 1977, and reached number 20 in the German singles chart at the end of the year.

The producer of the record, Jaap Eggermont, later used the idea to create the Stars On 45 medley hits in 1981, and to pad out the resulting album, known as Long Play Album on its Dutch release and Stars On 45 - The Album in the UK, to a full album length, Eggermont included two of the Shakers' medleys ("Do You Remember" and "Golden Years Of Rock & Roll") on the second side.

== Chart appearances ==
=== Albums ===
Year	Song	AUS	AUT	NL	DE	NZ	SWE	UK	US
1981	Long Play Album	1	2	3	1	1	15	1	9
2018	The Golden Years of Dutch Pop Music	–	–	65	–	–	–	–	–

=== Singles ===
Year	Song	NL	BE (Flemish)	BE (Walloon)	DE
1973	"You Should Have Seen Me (Rock 'N' Rollin')"	14	–	–	–
1974	"Turn Your Radio On"	14	–	–	–
1973	"Big Fat Mama"	14	–	–	–
1976	"Get Yourself Together"	12	–	–	–
1976	"Operator, Operator (Get Me A Line)"	12	21	–	–
1976	"Allright (Makin' Love In The Middle Of The Night"	9	14	45	–
1976	"Get It In"	–	29	–	–
1977	"Ballerina"	25	–	–	–
1977	"Do You Remember"	1	1	13	20
1978	"Golden Years Of Rock & Roll"	5	5	–	–
1979	"Witches (Hubble Bubble)"	47	–	–	–
"—" denotes releases that did not chart.

== Band members ==
- Arnie Treffers (Long Tall Ernie), vocals, 1972–82
- Jan Rietman (Jumping Johnny), keyboards, 1972–74
- Henk (The Knife) Bruysten, bass, 1972–74
- Alan Macfarlane, drums, 1972–78
- Harry Angeneind, drums, 1972
- Alfons Haket (Alfie Muscles), guitar/vocals, 1972–76
- Tony Britnell, sax/piano, 1975–82
- Jos Jaspers, guitar, 1976–77
- Karl Buskohl (Carl Carlton), guitar, 1977–79
- Jan Pijnenburg, drums, 1978–80
- Fred Brouwer, guitar, 1979–82
- Chris Meurs, drums, 1980–82
