= Trixon Drums =

German musical instrument company

Trixon Musikinstrumenten-Fabrik
- Company type: Private (1947–74); Brand (1997–present)
- Industry: Musical instruments
- Founded: 1947
- Founder: Karl-Heinz Weimer
- Defunct: 1974; 52 years ago
- Fate: Company closed in 1974, brand re-introduced in 1997
- Headquarters: Hamburg, Germany (1947–74); Stevens Point, USA (present)
- Key people: Arthur Oeschger (Weimer's successor)
- Products: List: Drum kit; Bongo; Chime; Conga; Djembe; Drumstick; Drum hardware; Marimba; Tambourine

Trixon is a former German musical instrument manufacturing company, established in 1947 by Karl-Heinz Weimer. Trixon drums were remarkable for their innovations in their construction, including conical and ellipsoidal shaped shells, and unique designs in mounting hardware. Their product line eventually included vibraphones, xylophones, conga drums and many stands and fittings.

After the company closed, the Trixon brand has had two revivals, the first in 1997 (which lasted a short time after all the inventory was destroyed by fire) and the second in 2007, which has remained to present days. The revived Trixon company is currently headquartered in Stevens Point, Wisconsin.

== History ==
Originally hand built by Weimer in his Hamburg, Germany workshop, Trixon drums proved popular enough with jazz drummers in Europe that the company opened a factory in Hamburg/Bramfeld, which produced Trixon drums from 1956 until 1965. Trixon quickly gained popularity with American jazz drummers of the 1950s and had several major artist endorsements, including Buddy Rich, and Lionel Hampton. There are photos of Ringo Starr of The Beatles playing (borrowed) Trixon drums during the band's early days in Hamburg, before his endorsement of Ludwig drums in 1963.

Trixon began exporting drums to the United States in 1965, which required a new and larger factory, opened in 1966 in Hamburg/Reinbek. In 1967, Trixon began producing drum sets in collaboration with the Vox Musical Instrument Co. bearing the Vox logo. To meet demand, Trixon opened a new facility in Shannon, Ireland, under the name Trixon, Ltd. in cooperation with the Dublin based Irish piano company, Rippen Ltd. When Rippen collapsed in the early 70's Trixon was also closed down, due to intense competition from Japanese drum manufacturers.

After the company was dissolved, Karl Weimer continued to provide repair service and spare parts through his music store, Music City in Hamburg, one of the largest dealers of music instruments in Europe. Karl Heinz Weimer died in 1997, after handing over the remaining Trixon business, including the warehouse containing the remainder of unsold stock to a partner, Arthur Oeschger. Oeschger tried to rebuild the Trixon brand and –with the help of Jim Laabs, who partnered Oeschger and invested the capital to carry on the project– started producing custom instruments with the remaining stock and molds, but a fire in 1998 destroyed the entire inventory, ending all production of Trixon instruments. Arthur Oeschger died in 2000.

After that, Laabs took control of Dixon in 2000. In late 2007, Jim Laabs, who was Arthur Oeschger's business partner and financier before the factory fire, re-introduced the Trixon Drum name in the USA. According to company literature, the new product line includes cocktail drumsets and marching band drums, as well as more traditional drumkits, although the newly reorganized Trixon has not revived any of Karl Weimer's more unusual drum designs. The drums are made in East Asia.

== Innovations ==
Karl-Heinz Weimer with a Trixon Speedfire 700 drum set (from 1961 product brochure)

Trixon Telstar 200 drum set (from the 1964 product brochure)

In the late 1950s Trixon produced its most recognizable product, the ellipsoidal bass drum, dubbed the "Speedfire". Resembling a cylinder flattened on one side into a trapezoidal-like shape, the drum was designed to be fitted with two bass drum pedals side-by-side. The interior of the drum was divided into two sections, and the unique shape of the shell allowed each pedal to produce a different pitch. Another innovation was the "Telstar" series, which featured conical shaped tom-toms and bass drums, tapered so one end was narrower than the other. The tom-toms were played from the narrow end of the shell, while the bass drum was played from the wide end.

Trixon also pioneered the development of fiberglass drum shells, introducing the "Jet" series in 1968. These single-headed drums featured an internal parabolic baffle which radiated the sound through concentric openings.

In drum hardware, Trixon developed the "Speedfire Rack", a single bar that passed through the shells of up to five tom-toms, supporting itself on two mounting brackets on the bass drum. This design eliminated separate tom-tom stands and made it possible to move the bass drum and all five tom-toms as one unit. This was the forerunner of the modern "drum racks" used by many drummers today. Trixon was the first drum manufacturer to use ball joints to mount drums and cymbals on the bass drum shell, another innovation later copied by other drum makers. Trixon also produced a "double" hi-hat stand, that allowed two pairs of hi-hat cymbals to be operated by one pedal.

== Artists ==
Notable musicians who played Trixon Drums include:

- Kenny Clare (UK)
- Davy De Decker (Belgium)
- Wolfgang Dziony (Germany)
- Victor Feldman (UK/USA)
- Lionel Hampton (USA)
- Gene Krupa (USA)
- Tony Meehan (UK)
- Brian Bennett (UK)
- Keith Moon (UK)
- John Vass (USA)
- Noel Redding (UK)
- Buddy Rich (USA)
- Phil Seamen (UK)
- Martin Schneider (Germany)
- Ringo Starr (UK)
- Gerd Stegner (Germany)
- Clyde Stubblefield (Vox/Trixon)(USA)
- Sam Woodyard (USA)
- Pete York (UK)
- Cor van der Beek (Netherlands)
