= Margriet Eshuijs =

Dutch singer (1952–2022)

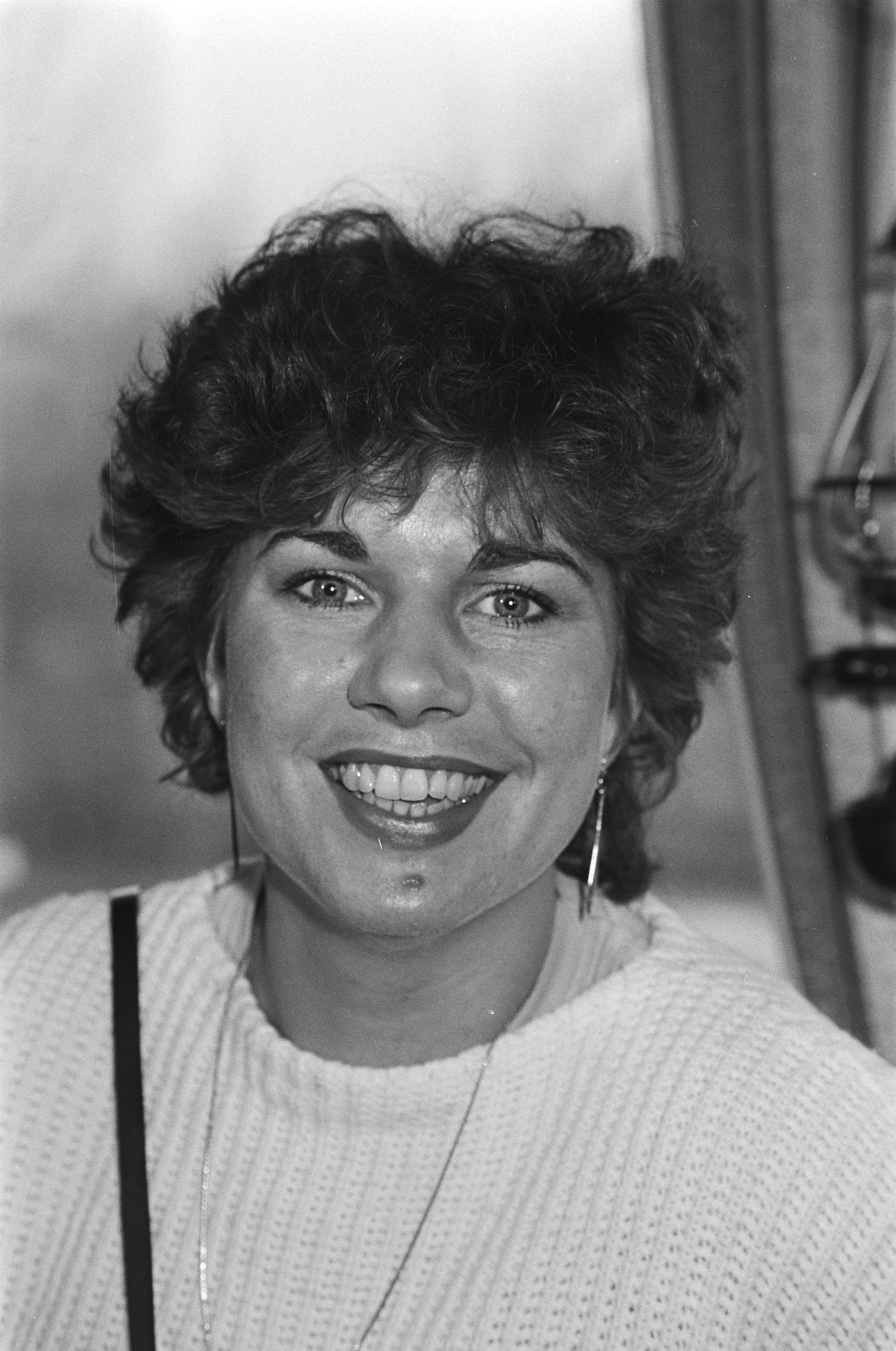
- Eshuijs in 1981
- Born: 14 October 1952; Zaandam, Netherlands
- Died: 29 December 2022 (aged 70); Zaandam, Netherlands
- Occupation: Singer

Margriet Eshuijs (14 October 1952 – 29 December 2022) was a Dutch singer.

== Life and career ==
Eshuijs was born in Zaandam, where her parents ran a music school and a record shop. A multi-instrumentist who played guitar, piano, organ and keyboards, Eshuijs started her professional career in 1972 co-founding the group Lucifer, best known for the songs "House for sale" and "Scarlet Lady" . After the group disbanded, Eshuijs continued her career as a solo artist, while also serving at the Music Conservatory in Alkmaar. Her major solo hit was the song "Black Pearl". In her later years she established a Margriet Eshuijs Pop Choir and was part of a local band, The Dream, led from her partner Maarten Peters.

During her career Eshuijs received numerous accolades and honours, notably three Edison Awards, a Golden Harp and the title of Knight of the Order of Orange-Nassau. She died after a long illness on 29 December 2022, at the age of 70.

== Discography ==
with Lucifer

- As We Are, 1975
- Margriet, 1977

Solo albums

- On the Move Again, 1979
- Right on Time, 1981
- Eye to Eye, 1982
- Sometimes, 1991
- The Wee Small Hours, 1993
- Shadow Dancing, 1996
- Step into the Light, 1998
- Time, 2001
- In Concert, 2005
