= Doe Maar =

Dutch Nederpop/ska band

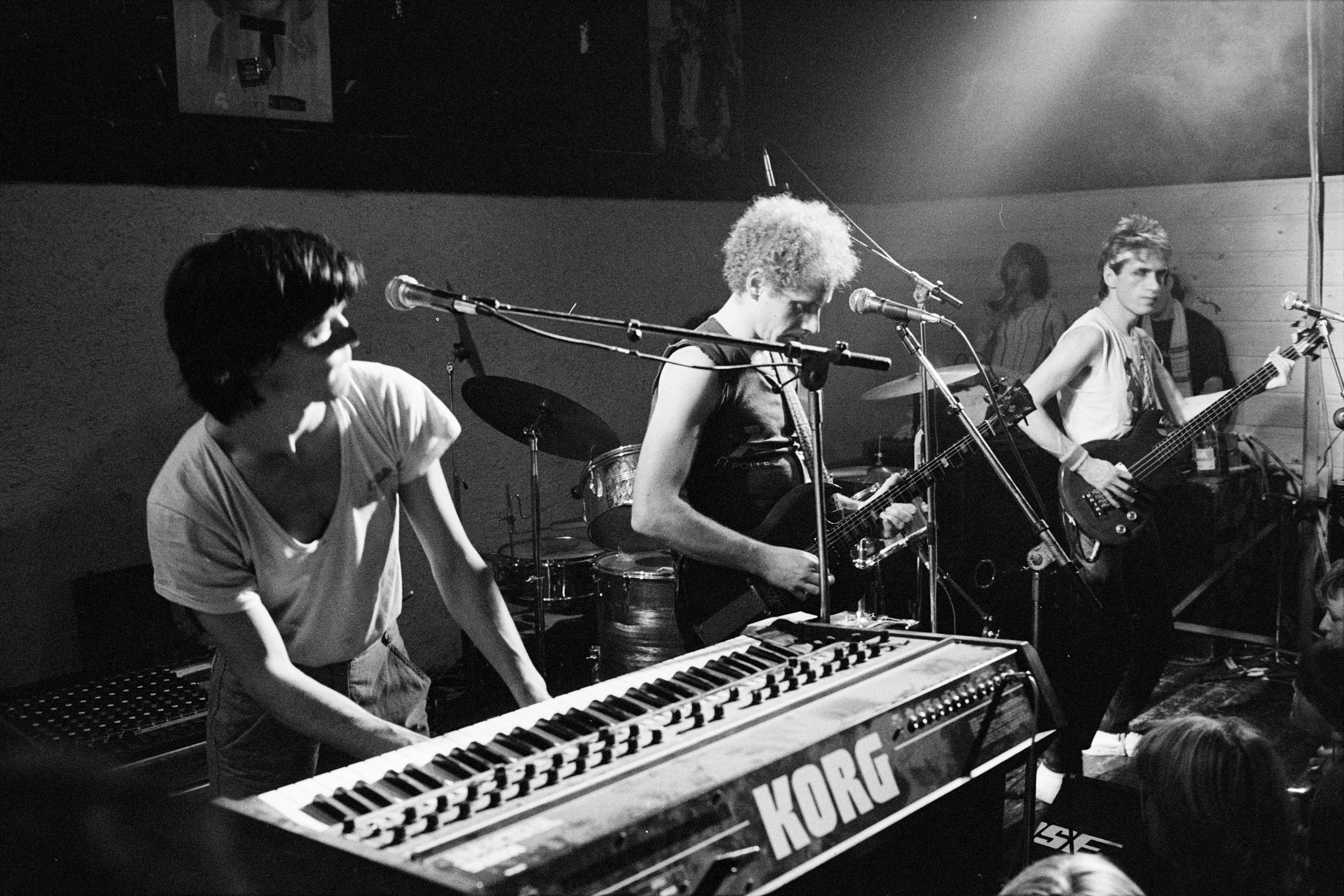
- Doe Maar in 1982

Background information
- Origin: Netherlands
- Genres: Nederpop; ska
- Years active: 1978–1984; 2000; 2008; (occasional reunions: 2011–2013, 2016–2018, 2021)
- Past members: Ernst Jansz; Jan Hendriks; Carel Copier; Piet Dekker; Henny Vrienten; René van Collem; Jan Pijnenburg

Doe Maar (Dutch pronunciation: [du ˈmaːr]; transl. "go ahead" or "just do it") was a Dutch pop band that combined punk, ska, and reggae influences. Formed in 1978, they broke up in 1984, reunited in 2000, and remained sporadically active from then until 2021, when their frontman, Henny Vrienten, became ill and subsequently died. Throughout their career, the band released five studio albums, four live albums, ten compilations, and numerous singles.

== History ==
=== Formation, first albums, and breakthrough ===
Doe Maar was formed in 1978 by keyboardist and vocalist Ernst Jansz, bassist Piet Dekker (they had previously played in several projects together, including Boudewijn de Groot's backing band), guitarist Jan Hendriks, and drummer Carel Copier. They released their debut, self-titled album a year later, and Dekker departed in 1980.

At the end of their first tour, Jansz invited Henny Vrienten, a professional musician and composer, to join the band as their bassist. They began work on the group's second album, Skunk, which was released in March 1981.

In 1982, Carel Copier suffered a career-ending injury, forcing him to depart the band. René van Collem was recruited in time to record Doe Maar's third album, Doris Day en andere Stukken, whose title track, "Doris Day", proved a hit. The album was a success and gained the band prominence among Dutch audiences. A dub version of the record, titled Doe De Dub, mixed by Vrienten and producer Peter Vincent, came out the same year, and the band won a Zilveren Harp award from Buma Cultuur. In May 1982, they were the opening act at Pinkpop. Van Collem left shortly after (he joined Spargo the following year) and was replaced by Jan Pijnenburg.

=== 4us, touring, and breakup ===
In March 1983, Doe Maar issued their fourth album, titled 4us (a creative spelling of "virus"). In September, the band embarked on their first tour of Belgium. They also released their first live album, titled Lijf aan lijf.

Jansz published his debut novel, Gideon's droom, while Vrienten recorded his first Dutch-language solo album, Geen ballade, having previously released the English-language record Paul Santos, in 1977. The last track on Geen ballade, the instrumental "Amstel Hotel 13:00", features all Doe Maar members playing their instruments.

In February 1984, Doe Maar went into the studio to record their fifth album. However, they made little headway, and after releasing the single "Macho", they decided to split up. The band played two farewell concerts at Maaspoort in Den Bosch, the recordings of which were released in 1995. They also released their first compilation album, titled 5 Jaar – Het complete overzicht, which included two new tracks. In the following years, the band played several reunion shows and released five more compilations.

=== Reunions, new music, and Vrienten's death ===
In November 1999, Doe Maar announced a one-time reunion. In February 2000, they issued two singles on the same day: Vrienten's "Als niet als", featuring rapper Brainpower, and Jansz' "Watje". In April, a new album from the band came out, titled Klaar. They played several concerts at Rotterdam Ahoy, a recording of which was released the same year, under the title Hees van Ahoy.

In December 2000, a tribute album, titled TriLLend Op M'n Benen (Doe Maar Door Anderen), consisting of 14 Doe Maar songs recorded by various artists, was released. Contributors to the record included Bløf, Postmen feat. Def Rhymz, Rowwen Hèze, Skik, Trijntje Oosterhuis, Caesar, the Prodigal Sons, Grof Geschut, Daryll-Ann, Abel, Heideroosjes, Marcel de Groot, Bob Fosko, and Osdorp Posse.

At the end of October 2005, reports appeared in the media that Doe Maar was working with V&V Entertainment on a musical theatre production set to their music. Doe Maar!, subtitled De popmusical, premiered in Tilburg on 28 January 2007 and was attended by the full band. It was nominated for five John Kraaijkamp Music Awards and won four, including best male lead (Daniël Boissevain), best male supporting role (Jan Elbertse), best female supporting role (Annick Boer), as well as the audience award. Written by Pieter van de Waterbeemd, the production's cast also included Kim-Lian and Jan Rot.

In May 2012, Vrienten announced on the television program De Wereld Draait Door that Doe Maar was working on new material, in collaboration with the record label TopNotch. Released in September of that year, Versies/Limmen Tapes was a double album that consisted of new versions of the band's classic songs on the first disc, Limmen Tapes, and rap covers of Doe Maar tracks on Versies, produced by the Anonymous Mis, by such artists as Gers Pardoel, Kempi, Kraantje Pappie, the Opposites, Winne, Extince, Postmen, Def Rhymz, and Spinvis.

Later that year, the band received the Edison Award, and they held a charity concert for War Child.

In early 2013, Doe Maar embarked on the Glad ijs tour. Later that year, the television documentary Doe Maar: Dit is Alles was broadcast. In 2016, they celebrated the 32nd anniversary of their breakup and released a Dutch version of Toots and the Maytals' "54-46 That's My Number" with Surinamese reggae singer Kenny B.

In 2018, Doe Maar celebrated their 40th anniversary with the club tour Er verandert NIX. In 2021, the band was set to perform at Down the Rabbit Hole, but the event was cancelled due to the COVID-19 pandemic. A farewell tour for the group, which was to start at the end of 2021, was also cancelled, owing to Vrienten's illness.

On 25 April 2022, Henny Vrienten died of lung cancer, at the age of 73.

On 31 May 2024, the band's original drummer, Carel Copier, died of cancer, at the age of 72.

Drummer Jan Pijnenburg died unexpectedly in Spain on 12 November 2026, at the age of 70.

== Trivia ==
Doe Maar have a tile on the Walk of Fame outside GelreDome stadium, in Arnhem, for four sold-out shows of Symphonica in Rosso they performed there in 2012.

== Band members ==
=== Final lineup ===
- Ernst Jansz – vocals, keyboards (1978–1984, 2000, 2008, 2011–2013, 2016–2018, 2021)
- Jan Hendriks – guitar, backing vocals (1978–1984, 2000, 2008, 2011–2013, 2016–2018, 2021)
- Henny Vrienten – vocals, bass (1980–1984, 2000, 2008, 2011–2013, 2016–2018, 2021; died 2022)
- René van Collem – drums (1981–1982, 2011–2013, 2016–2018, 2021; touring 1982)

=== Past members ===
- Piet Dekker – vocals, bass (1978–1980)
- Carel Copier – drums, vocals (1978–1981; died 2024)
- Jan Pijnenburg – drums (1982–1984, 2000, 2008; died 2026)

== Discography ==
=== Albums ===
Studio albums

- Doe Maar (1979)
- Skunk (nl) (1981)
- Doris Day en andere stukken (nl) (1982)
- 4us (nl) (1983)
- Klaar (nl) (2000)

Live albums

- Lijf aan lijf (nl) (1983)
- Het afscheidsconcert – Live in de Maaspoort 's-Hertogenbosch (1995)
- Hees van Ahoy (2000)
- Symphonica in Rosso (nl) (2012)

Compilations

- 5 jaar Doe Maar, Het complete overzicht (1984)
- De beste van Doe Maar (1984)
- De beste (1991)
- Het complete hitoverzicht (1994)
- Het allerbeste van Doe Maar (1999)
- Alles (1999)
- Hollands glorie (2004)
- Écht alles (2007)
- De singles (2008)
- De doos van Doe Maar (box set, 2012)

Other albums

- Doe de dub – Discodubversie (nl) (dub version of Doris Day, 1982)
- Versies/Limmen tapes (Doe Maar and various performers, 2012)
- TriLLend Op M'n Benen (Doe Maar Door Anderen) (tribute album, 2000)
- Doe Maar! De popmusical (soundtrack from the musical, 2007)

Compilation appearances

- Uitholling overdwars (1979)
- De gevestigde orde (1982)
- Een gebaar (charity album for Amnesty International, 1983)

=== Singles ===
- "Ik zou het willen doen" (1979)
- "Sinds 1 dag of 2 (32 jaar)" (1980)
- "Smoorverliefd" (1981)
- "Doris Day" (1982)
- "Is dit alles" (1982)
- "De bom" (1982)
- "Pa" (1983)
- "1 nacht alleen" (1983)
- "Macho" (1984)
- "Sinds 1 dag of 2 (32 jaar)" (1991)
- "Als niet als" – with Brainpower & Def P (2000)
- "Watje" (2000)
- "De bom" (2007)
