= List of bands from the Netherlands =

This is a list of bands from the Netherlands.

== 0-9 ==
- 2 Brothers on the 4th Floor
- 2 Unlimited
- 3JS

== A ==
- a balladeer
- Accordéon Mélancolique
- Acda en De Munnik
- Alamo Race Track
- Alquin
- The Amazing Stroopwafels
- Ambeon
- Antidote
- Antillectual
- The Apers
- Arling & Cameron
- Asphyx
- Asrai
- Audiotransparent
- Aux Raus
- Ayreon

== B ==
- Babe
- George Baker Selection
- Bardo State
- Barthezz
- Batmobile
- Bauer
- Beatbusters
- Bearforce1
- Beef
- Benjamin B
- Bettie Serveert
- Bintangs
- Blackbriar
- Bloem de Ligny
- Bløf
- Blue Diamonds
- Frank Boeijen Groep
- The Bohemes
- Bojoura
- Bolland & Bolland
- Born From Pain
- Bots
- Brainbox
- Brainpower
- BZN
- Banji

== C ==
- Caesar
- The Cats
- Cesair
- Chef'Special
- Ch!pz
- Clan of Xymox
- Claw Boys Claw
- Cloudmachine
- Coparck
- Cuby + Blizzards

== D ==
- D-Men
- Daryll-Ann
- Day Six
- Dawnseekers
- De Dijk
- De Staat
- Def P & Beatbusters
- Delain
- De Staat
- Destine
- Detonation
- Di-rect
- Diesel
- Do-The-Undo
- Doe Maar
- Dolly Dots
- Doop
- Dutch Swing College Band

== E ==
- Earth & Fire
- Ekseption
- El Pino and the Volunteers
- Elexorien
- Epica
- Euromasters
- The Ex
- Extince

== F ==
- Face Tomorrow
- Fantastique
- Fatal Flowers
- Finch
- Flairck
- Fluitsma & Van Tijn
- Focus
- Follow That Dream
- Freeway
- Frizzle Sizzle

== G ==
- The Gathering
- Gem
- The Gentle Storm
- Ghost Trucker
- Go Back to the Zoo
- Het Goede Doel
- God Dethroned
- Golden Earring
- Gorefest
- Gotcha!
- Green Lizard
- Group 1850
- Gruppo Sportivo
- Guilt Machine

== H ==
- Hallo Venray
- De Hardheid
- Hardwell
- De Havenzangers
- Hearts of Soul
- Heideroosjes
- Heidevolk
- The Herb Spectacles
- Hermes House Band
- The Hotchas

== I ==
- I Against I
- I-F
- I Spy
- Ileum
- Incision
- Intwine
- Ivy Green

== J ==
- Jan Akkerman
- Jeroen van der Boom
- Johan
- John Coffey
- Jozef van Wissem

== K ==
- K-liber
- K-otic
- Kane
- Kayak
- Kensington
- De Kift
- Kinderen voor Kinderen
- Klangstof
- Klubbheads
- Kraak & Smaak
- Krang
- Krezip

== L ==
- L.A. Style
- Laidback Luke
- Laserdance
- Last Days of Humanity
- Thé Lau
- Legion Of The Damned
- Legowelt
- The Lemming
- Loïs Lane
- LPG
- Lucky Fonz III
- Luie Hond
- Luv'

== M ==
- The Mad Trist
- Madhouse
- Marching and Cycling Band HHK
- Marlayne
- Maywood
- The medics
- Minny Pops
- Moke
- Mo'Jones
- Moss
- The Motions
- Mouth & MacNeal
- Mr. Review

== N ==
- Nembrionic
- Nemesea
- New Adventures
- New Cool Collective
- Nick & Simon
- The Nits
- Normaal
- Noisia

== O ==
- Odyssice
- Officium Triste
- OG3NE
- Omnia
- Opgezwolle
- Orphanage
- Osdorp Posse
- The Outsiders

== P ==
- Party Animals
- The Partysquad
- Pater Moeskroen
- Personal Trainer
- Pestilence
- Peter Pan Speedrock
- Picture
- Plaeto
- Pussycat

== Q ==
- Q65

== R ==
- Racoon
- Rank 1
- Rapalje
- Renée
- ReVamp
- Room Eleven
- Roosbeef
- Rosemary's Sons
- Rotterdam Philharmonic Orchestra
- Rotterdam Ska-Jazz Foundation
- Rotterdam Termination Source
- Rotterdam Terror Corps
- Rowwen Hèze
- Royal Concertgebouw Orchestra

== S ==
- S10
- Sandra & Andres
- Saskia & Serge
- The Scene
- The Serenes
- The Sheer
- Shocking Blue
- The Shoes
- Silence is Sexy
- Silhouette
- Silkstone
- Sinister
- Sita
- Skik
- Sky Architect
- Smogus
- Solo
- Solution
- Speedy J
- De Spelbrekers
- Spinvis
- Star One
- Stars on 45
- Stream of Passion
- Sugar Boy and the Sinners
- Son Mieux

== T ==
- T-Spoon
- Teach-In
- Tee-Set
- Ten Sharp
- Textures
- Thanatos
- Tielman Brothers
- Time Bandits
- Total Touch
- Trace
- The Travoltas
- Trio Lescano
- Tuindorp Hustler Click
- Twarres
- Twenty 4 Seven
- Two Brothers on the 4th Floor

== U ==
- Urban Dance Squad

== V ==
- Van Dik Hout
- VanDenBerg
- Vandenberg's Moonkings
- Vengaboys
- Vengeance
- Vitesse
- VOF de Kunst
- Voicst
- Volumia!
- Vulcano

== W ==
- W&W
- WETT
- What Fun!
- Wild Romance
- Within Temptation

== Y ==
- Yukka

== Z ==
- Zinatra
- Zuco 103
- zZz

== See also ==
- List of Dutch artists
- List of Dutch composers
- List of Dutch musicians
