= Ilium =

Ilium or Ileum may refer to:

== Places and jurisdictions ==
- Ilion (Asia Minor), former name of Troy
- Ilium (Epirus), an ancient city in Epirus, Greece
- Ilium, ancient name of Cestria (Epirus), an ancient city in Epirus, Greece
- Ilium Building, a building in Troy, New York, United States

== Anatomy ==
- Ilium (bone), part of the hip bone in the pelvis
- Ileum, the third and final part of the small intestine

== Art and entertainment ==
- Ileum (band), a grunge rock band from The Netherlands
- Ilium (band), a metal band from Australia
- Ilium (novel), a 2003 novel by Dan Simmons
- Ilium (Kurt Vonnegut), a fictional New York town in many of Kurt Vonnegut's novels
- Illium, a fictional location in the video game Mass Effect 2

== Other uses ==
- Camp Ilium, a YMCA camp

== See also ==
- Ilion (disambiguation)
- Ilum (disambiguation)
- Iliad (disambiguation)
