= Ilion =

Ilion may refer to:

- Ilion (Ἴλιον) or (Latinized) Ilium, an Archaic name for the pre-classical city of Troy, hence the title of Homer's Iliad, also a Byzantine city and bishopric, which remains a Latin Catholic titular see as Ilium
- Ilion, Greece, a suburb of Athens, Greece, also known as Nea Liosia
- Ilium (Epirus), ancient city of Epirus, Greece
- Ilion, ancient name of Cestria (Epirus), a town of ancient Epirus, Greece
- Ilion (Thessaly), a town of ancient Thessaly, Greece
- Ilion Animation Studios, a CGI animation studio based in Madrid, Spain
- Ilion, New York, a village in Herkimer County, New York
- Ilion (album), a 2024 album by French band Slift

== See also ==
- Ilium (disambiguation)
- Iliad (disambiguation)
- Ileum, the third and final part of the small intestine
