= LPG (Dutch band) =

Dutch indie-pop band

LPG is a Dutch indie-pop band, signed on Excelsior Recordings/V2 Records. In April 2005, their critically acclaimed debut album I fear no foe was released in the Netherlands, receiving positive reviews from established magazines and websites, such as Oor, VPRO 3voor12 and Volkskrant. There were few negative reviews, which mostly struggled with the applause in the opening track Speech, and the diversity of the band.

Shortlty after releasing the debut album, the band released a homemade music video to the song Sparrow, which consisted out of more than 1500 separate photos, resulting in an artistic animation. All in their early twenties, the band toured the Netherlands and supported such acts as The Cribs and Zita Swoon. In January 2006, the band announced the song Belly Rollercoaster from their debut album I fear no foe was to be used in a worldwide TV commercial for the Nokia 6280 mobile phone. The music video to this song proved a struggle to make, and was released several months after its premature release party.

== History ==
In 2002 Anne van Wieren and Arend-Jan - two friends from high-school - decided to start a band and record a demo on their own. They both had been in bands before, but wanted to take a fresh and new approach to music, one without concessions. They record their first demo at home in Hoogezand-Sappemeer, a small municipality in Groningen. After sending the demo to several friends and people in the record industry, they receive positive feedback and decide to form a band. Gerald Kooistra (bass), Christiaan Nijburg (drums) and Rob van Essen (keys) join in and the basement of Christiaan's parents house is turned into the band's recording and practicing room.

The first gigs were either really good or really bad. One of the most talked about gigs in the early years is to be played in Volta, where a girl takes place on a bar stool behind a microphone stand, only to drink wine and smoke cigarettes.

In 2003, VPRO 3voor12 and Excelsior Recordings discover the band. On 3voor12 several items about the band are placed in one of which Niels Aalbert (A&R for Universal Music Group in the Netherlands) praises the band for their ambition and commitment, comparing the band to The Lemonheads and Guided by Voices, yet he feels the band would be better at place at a smaller label such as Konkurrent or Excelsior Recordings. The latter take on the challenge, and give the band the gigs and time they need to grow before they can record their debut album. As a taste, the band release a handmade 7" vinyl split-single featuring the demo version of Sparrow, with the previously unreleased Spinvis song Goochelaars en geesten as the B-Side.

In 2004, Rob decides to leave the band and focus on college even before the band started recording in the studio. A replacement is quickly and easily found: Martien ter Veen. In several sessions LPG record their debut album at the SSE studios in Weesp, with Frans Hagenaars as their producer. They finish recording at the end of 2004, after which the tracks are being mastered in the Wisseloord Studios by Darius van Helfteren. The band find themselves a manager in Sander Zuidema and prepare themselves for the release of their debut album by performing on both the Eurosonic and Noorderslag festival in January 2005.

On April 4, 2005, the band release I fear no foe. With positive reviews coming in from several established magazines and websites, they finally find themselves a booking agency in Mana Music. An intensive tour through the Netherlands follows. The band shares the stage with such acts as The Cribs, The Dears, Voicst and Zita Swoon. Peter Weening of VERA - a famous club for the international pop underground - asks the band to perform on his 25th anniversary of this award-winning venue. Spinvis asks the band to join them, supporting his completely sold-out club-tour throughout the Netherlands. Throughout the year the gets a good name in the media, and steals the hearts of many die -hard music fans, yet fails to take the next step in becoming a mainstream act with international fame.

In 2006, after a wild and successful year, the band start with more good news just before their second appearance on Eurosonic. Thanks to Massive Music (a company specializing in composing or selecting the right tracks for the right commercials, TV-shows or movies) the band get the attention of Grey advertising and Nokia, who select the song Belly Rollercoaster to be used in a worldwide TV and Radio campaign to introduce their new Nokia 6280 cellphones. This news alone gets the band a lot of international attention in the media, with several appearances on TV and Radio as a result. A week later, the band perform in a completely sold out Paradiso (Amsterdam) together with Spinvis, filmed and broadcast by Fabchannel. It takes more than 4 months after that until the Nokia commercial first airs, and the band release the music video to Belly Rollercoaster. In the meantime, the band focus on their performances and promotion on MySpace, attracting an increasing number of fans on the LPG MySpace profile

In June 2006 the band announce a change of management. Sander Zuidema, who has managed the band from the start, is to focus more on internet promotion, whilst a new manager Maarten van der Helm, bass-player of Skik, is attracted in order to let the band take the next leap forward. During live performances the band start to play new songs and in the media they hint their next album might become a bit more consistent and up-tempo. In the summer they perform - and are to perform - on several festivals in the Netherlands, closing down with a theatre performance in their hometown Hoogezand-Sappemeer.

In 2007 LPG record their new album, to be released in 2008, with Frans Hagenaars in the SSE studio's in Weesp. In October 2007, they use 11.000 Tomato paste cans to recreate a band photo on the Spui square in The Hague. The resulting photo, taken from great height, will be used as their new album cover. Video footage of the band creating this artwork can be found over here.

== Biography ==
(taken from the official LPG website)

LPG is a versatile band from the Netherlands, full of ambition. In their songs, you can clearly hear the old legends of the 60s and 70s (Beach Boys, Beatles, Velvet Underground, Neil Young), combined with influences from the more recent indie-scene (Beck, Beta Band, Blur, Pavement (band), The Shins, Sufjan Stevens), resulting in catchy, polyphonic pop songs full of surprising twists and bends. LPG is also greatly involved in creating their own artwork, merchandize and promotion. The band's motto is 'to accomplish as much as possible by doing as much as possible' for a reason. With performances on Eurosonic, a Nokia commercial and plenty of new songs for a second album it's more than clear that LPG is still to accomplish a lot more than they already have.

== Discography ==
- 2004 - Sparrow/Goochelaars en geesten (7" split single with Spinvis)
- 2005 - I fear no foe (Full-length debut album)
- 2008 - With the Earth Above Me
- 2012 - The Village

== Band members ==
- Anne Caesar van Wieren (Guitar/bass/vocals)
- Arend Jan van der Scheer (Guitar/vocals)
- Gerard Halbe Kooistra (Bass/guitar/vocals)
- Martien ter Veen (Keyboards/guitar/vocals)
- Christiaan Jan Paul Nijburg (Drums/vocals)
