= De Heidebloem, Erica =

Smock mill in Erica, Netherlands

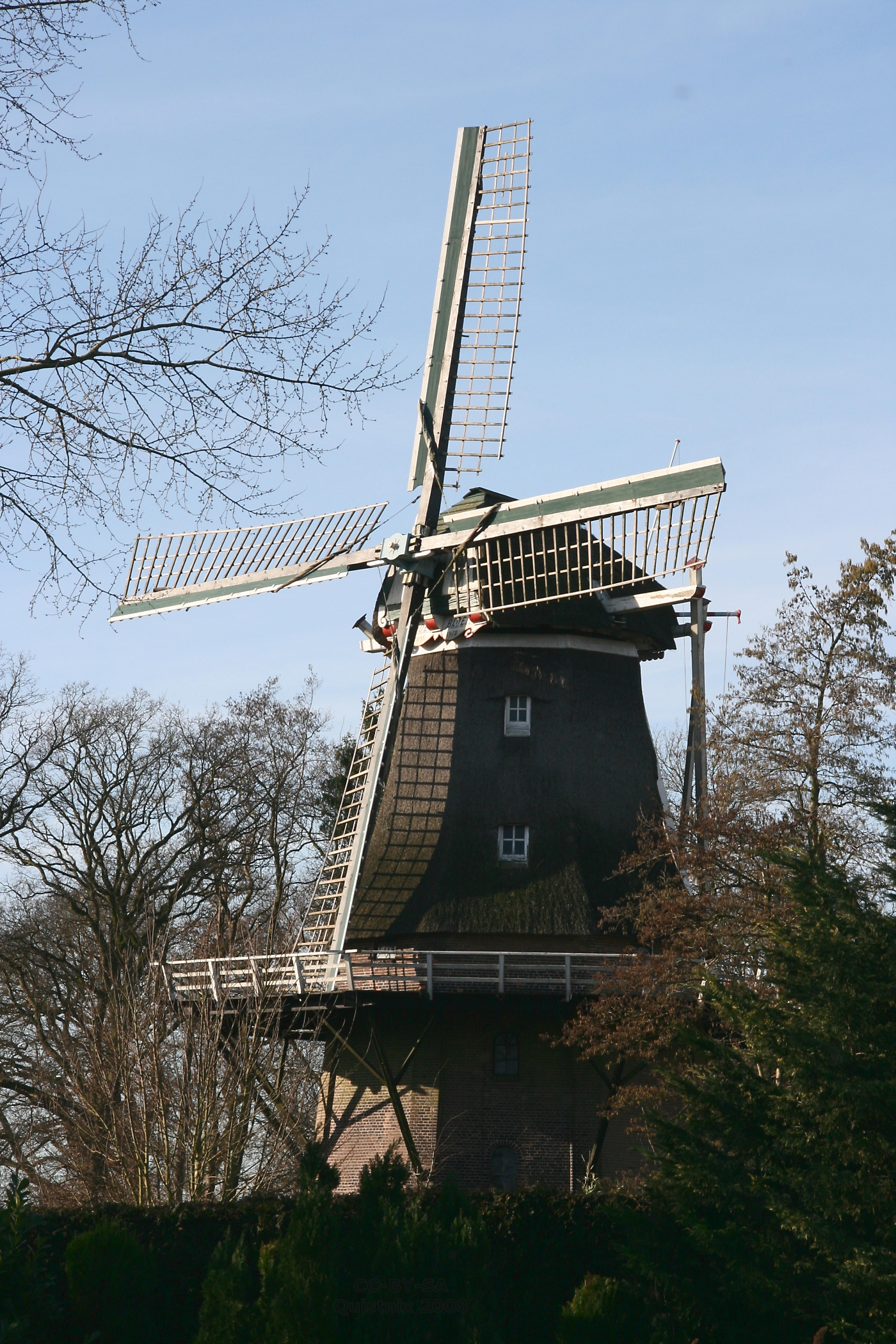
- De Heidebloem, February 2008

Origin
- Mill name: De Heidebloem
- Mill location: Verlengde Vaart ZZ 86, 7887 EP, Erica
- Coordinates: 52°43′3″N 6°55′35″E
- Operator: J. Tigelaar
- Year built: 1897

Information
- Purpose: Corn mill
- Type: Smock mill
- Storeys: Three-storey smock
- Base storeys: Two-storey base
- Smock sides: Eight sides
- No. of sails: Four sails
- Type of sails: Common sails
- Windshaft: Cast iron
- Winding: Tailpole and winch
- No. of pairs of millstones: One pair of Cullen stones, one pair of French Burr stones.
- Size of millstones: Both 1.40 metres (4 ft 7 in) diameter

De Heidebloem (English: Heather flower) is a smock mill in Erica, Netherlands. It was built in 1895. The mill is listed as a Rijksmonument, number 14962.

== History ==
The mill was built by millwright Huberts of Coevorden in 1897. It replaced an earlier mill which was built in 1877 and burnt down in 1895. Between 1894 and 1911, the sails on the mill were rented from sailmaker Wouda of Meppel. The mill was working until 1943, when a stock broke. The mill then became derelict. In 1976, a proposal was put forward to move the mill to another location. This was not carried out and the mill was restored over the winter of 1977-78. The restoration was carried out by millwrights Fabrikaant Roemeling & Molema of Scheemda, Groningen. On completion of the restoration the mill was renamed Heidebloem. It is in working order and used to train millers in their work.

The mill is privately owned and operated by J. Tigelaar of Erica; for his civic contribution, in 2004 Tigelaar was made a member of the Order of Orange-Nassau.

== Description ==
De Heidebloem is what the Dutch describe as an "achtkante stellingmolen", a smock mill with a stage. The brick base is two storeys and the three-storey smock and cap are thatched. The stage is 7.50 metres (24 ft 7 in) above ground level. The four common sails have a span of 20.20 metres (66 ft 3 in). They are carried on a cast-iron windshaft which was cast by the Koninklijke Nederlandse Grofsmederij in 1896. The windshaft also carries the brake wheel which has 68 cogs. This drives the wallower (35 cogs) at the top of the upright shaft. At the bottom end of the upright shaft the great spur wheel (121 cogs) drives two lantern pinion stone nuts, of 39 staves each. One stone nut drives a pair of 1.40 metres (4 ft 7 in) Cullen millstones. The other stone nut drives a pair of 1.40 metres (4 ft 7 in) French Burr millstones.

== Millers ==
- Jan ten Brink 1894-1901
- H Dijks 1903-05
- Jan ten Brink 1908-11
- J Tigelaar from 1978

Reference for above:-

== Public access ==
De Heidebloem is open to the public on Saturdays from 08:30-12:00 or by appointment.
