= Air Bubble =

Air Bubble may refer to:

- Air Bubble (band), Dutch band
- Air bubble, in physics
