= Ilum =

Ilum can refer to:

- Ilah, as a form of the Akkadian word for "god"
- Ilum (Star Wars), a fictional planet in the Star Wars franchise

== See also ==
- Ilium (disambiguation)
- Iluma
