= Consolation (band) =

Dutch death metal/grindcore band

- Origin: Zaanstreek, Netherlands
- Genres: Death metal, grindcore
- Years active: 1989–1999, 2002–2005, 2008-
- Label: Displeased Records
- Members: Toep Duin; Dennis Jak; Rein Schorel; Arjan van Exter; Robert van der Mijle
- Past members: Manoloxx; Jehudi van der Poll; Roel Sluitman; Machiel Siekerman; Hans Ruff

Consolation is the name of a former Dutch death metal/grindcore band from the Zaanstreek that formed in 1989. They released three full-length albums through Displeased Records and were called the Dutch "Gods of Grind"; at their peak, in the late 1990s, they were one of the highest rated metal bands in the Netherlands, according to Dutch metal magazine Aardschok.

The band split up in 1999. They more or less restarted in 2002 as Cardinal, playing shows as late as 2005. A real comeback under their old name came in late 2008, when they announced reunion shows at the end of 2008 and the beginning of 2009.

== Discography ==
- Unnamed (demo, 1990)
- Beautyfilth (Album, Displeased Records, 1993)
- Hardcore Leeft (split with Nembrionic Hammerdeath and Osdorp Posse, 1994)
- The Truth (EP, Displeased, 1994)
- Brave Melvin from the Southern Point (Album, Displeased, 1995)
- Stahlplaat (Album, Displeased, 1998)

== Members ==
- Dennis Jak (founder) - guitar, vocals
- Toep Duin - drums
- Manoloxx - vocals (- 1996)
- Rein Schorel - bass
- Arjan van Exter - vocals (1998- )
- Robert van der Mijle - guitar, vocals
