= Nembrionic =

Dutch death metal band

- Also known as: Nembrionic Hammerdeath
- Origin: Netherlands
- Genres: Death metal, grindcore
- Years active: 1991–1999
- Label: Displeased
- Past members: Jamil Beroud; Dennis Jak; Noel Derek Rule Van Eersel; Marco "Bor" Westenbrink

Nembrionic was a Dutch death metal band formed in 1991 as black metal group Nembrionic Hammerdeath. They shortened the name to Nembrionic in 1993. The band released three albums on Displeased Records and another with Osdorp Posse. They split up in 1999.

== Biography ==
The band started in April 1991, influenced by Venom, Possessed, and Terrorizer, and recorded a demo in that same year. Their 1992 EP sold 1800 copies and earned the band a deal with Dutch metal label Displeased Records. They moved toward grindcore and death metal on Tempter, a split with Consolation. The band played about 30 shows to promote the album and toured with At the Gates and Consolation.

Their next album, Psycho One Hundred, led to shows at open air festivals such as Liberation Day, Mundial, and Lowlands, and a show in Rotterdam Ahoy. In 1996, they joined Osdorp Posse to record Briljant, Hard en Geslepen, which charted in the Netherlands. Nembrionic played at Dynamo Open Air and Pinkpop Festival, and even opened for Slayer in Paradiso, June 1996.

Their second to last release was Bloodcult, which contained home recordings and other songs besides almost the entire 1992 EP. Their final effort was Incomplete, "[their] answer to the fading brutality in the music scene."

== Discography ==
- Lyrics of Your Last Will (demo, 1991)
- Themes on an Occult Theory (EP, 1992)
- Tempter (split with Consolation, Displeased Records, 1993)
- Hardcore Leeft (split EP with Consolation and Osdorp Posse, 1994)
- Psycho One Hundred (CD, Displeased, 1995)
- Briljant, hard en geslepen (with Osdorp Posse; CD, Displeased, 1996)
- Bloodcult (MCD, Displeased, 1997)
- Incomplete (CD, Displeased, 1998)

== Members ==
- Jamil Beroud - bass
- Dennis Jak - guitar
- Noel Van Eersel - drums
- Marco "Bor" Westenbrink - guitar, vocals
