= Skik =

Dutch pop group

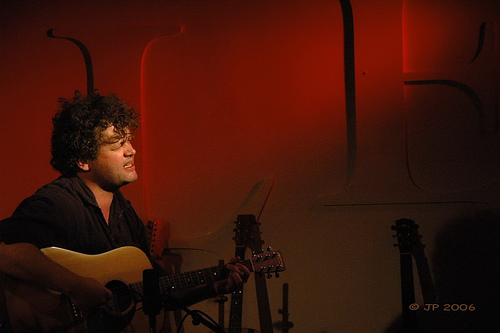
- Daniël Lohues, leader of Skik

Background information
- Origin: Erica (Drenthe), Netherlands
- Genres: Pop, Blues
- Years active: 1994 - 2004
- Past members: Daniël Lohues, Marco Geerdink, Maarten van der Helm, Marlen Davers
- Website: (in Dutch) www.skik.nl

Skik is a Dutch pop group, originating from the town of Erica, Drenthe. The band mainly sings in Drèents, a variation of Low-Saxon, which is traditionally spoken in Drenthe. Skik is Drèents for fun or enjoyment.

== Biography ==
Skik's first performance was in 1994, on Muzem, a festival dedicated to the dialect, in Emmen, Netherlands. Later they got several hits, including Op Fietse (Gone cycling) and Hoe kan dat nou? (How come?). These two songs are both from their first popular album, Niks Is Zoas 't Lek (Nothing's the way it seems to be). The follow-up of this album, 's Nachts (At night), produces the hits 't Giet Zoas 't Giet (It goes the way it goes) and Af & Toe (Now & Then).

The CD Overal & Nergens (Everywhere & Nowhere) meant a breaking of the ties with the Drèents, which resulted in a song in ABN (Broadcast Dutch). Ik Ga Als Een Speer made it to the charts, but no of the other songs did. The next song of theirs that made it into the charts was Ik heb geen zin om op te staan, which they recorded together with Henk Westbroek. Their next and fifth CD, Tof (Awesome) brought along the single-CD Dankjewel Voor De Zon (Thanks for the sun), which featured a video clip made by students of the HKU.

In 2004 the compilation-CD Best Tof (Kinda Cool), a play on Best of, was published. The group was on a promotion tour for the CD until September that same year. After that, Skik was less noticeable, as band leader Daniël Lohues was going solo with the 'Louisiana Blues Club'. On the first of Oktober 2006 the group performed on a surprise party for the 25-year anniversary of De Dijk, another Dutch band. Skik performed the song Stampvol Café for the occasion.

== Discography ==
=== Albums ===
- Skik (1995)
- Niks is zoas 't lek (1997)
- s Nachts (1999)
- Overal & nergens (2000)
- Tof (2002)

=== Compilations ===
- Best Tof (2004)

=== Singles ===
- "Tomme" (1996)
- "Klotenweer"(1996)
- "Ik heb wel 's zo'n dag" (1996)
- "Niks Meer Te Vertellen" (1996)
- "Op fietse" (1997)
- "Nie veur spek & bonen" (1997)
- "Hoe kan dat nou?" (1998)
- "Af & Toe" (1999)
- "'T giet zoas 't giet" (1999)
- "Als ik wil" (1999)
- "Logisch toch (of niet)?" (2000)
- "Ik ga als 'n speer" (2000)
- "Ik wil weg" (2001)
- "Ik heb geen zin om op te staan" (2002) (single met Henk Westbroek)
- "Verliefd" (2002)
- "Dankjewel voor de zon" (2002)
- "Tof" (2002)
- "Grachten Van Amsterdam" (2004)

=== Other ===
There are two more songs by Skik that aren't distributed, and that can't be found on regular CD's. These are: De Sneij (The Snow), which was published as an addition to the VPRO Christmas CD in 1998, and Woar Ben Ik Mee Bezig (What Am I Doing), which had an alternative version published on the CD Twee Meter Sessies NL 1.

== Trivia ==
- The song Op Fietse describes a tour by bicycle through South-East Drenthe, which is the area in which lead singer Daniël Lohues was born. The Drenthe Office of Tourism (VVV) later made this into a real route: "the Skik-route"
- Op Fietse was used for two Dutch TV commercials. The first of which was one for Calvé, a Dutch brand of peanut butter dating back to 2005. It would later also be used in an advertisement for ING, a major bank in the Netherlands.
- The single-version of Hoe Kan Dat Nou later got Niks is Zoas 't Lek as bonus track added on its CD.
- Guitarist Marco Geerdink is a nephew of frontman Daniël Lohues and played in Gimme Shelter, a Rolling Stones-cover band. He replaced Despo Kristel during the comeback of The Schizo's. Lohues said in an interview that The Shizo's were a major source of inspiration for all bands from Drenthe.

== See also ==
- List of bands from the Netherlands
