= Sugar Boy and the Sinners =

Dutch band

Sugar Boy and the Sinners is a Dutch band from South Holland. The band is formed by brothers Vinnie and Ronnie Guerin in 2010, together with Boy Vielvoye and the Frankie Duindam. In their early years, the band focused mainly on blues, but more recently the band is inspired by old school soul, rock and roll and funk.

== Biography ==
After playing the local blues circuit, Sugar Boy and the Sinners acquired nationwide attention by playing festivals such as Moulin Blues and Breda Jazz.

The band' won the Dutch Blues Challenge 2012. As a result, Sugar Boy and the Sinners represented the Netherlands at the European Blues Challenge in Toulouse (3rd place out of 19) and the International Blues Challenge in Memphis, United States (semi-finals).

The band has toured throughout Europe in countries such as Belgium, Germany, France and Italy. Their debut album was released at the Paradiso in Amsterdam on 7 February 2014.

== Discography ==
=== Albums ===
Album	Release date
All You Can Eat	7 February 2014

=== Singles ===
Singles	Release date
Third Round of Gin	22 November 2013
High Roller	9 January 2014
