= The Bohemes =

Dutch band

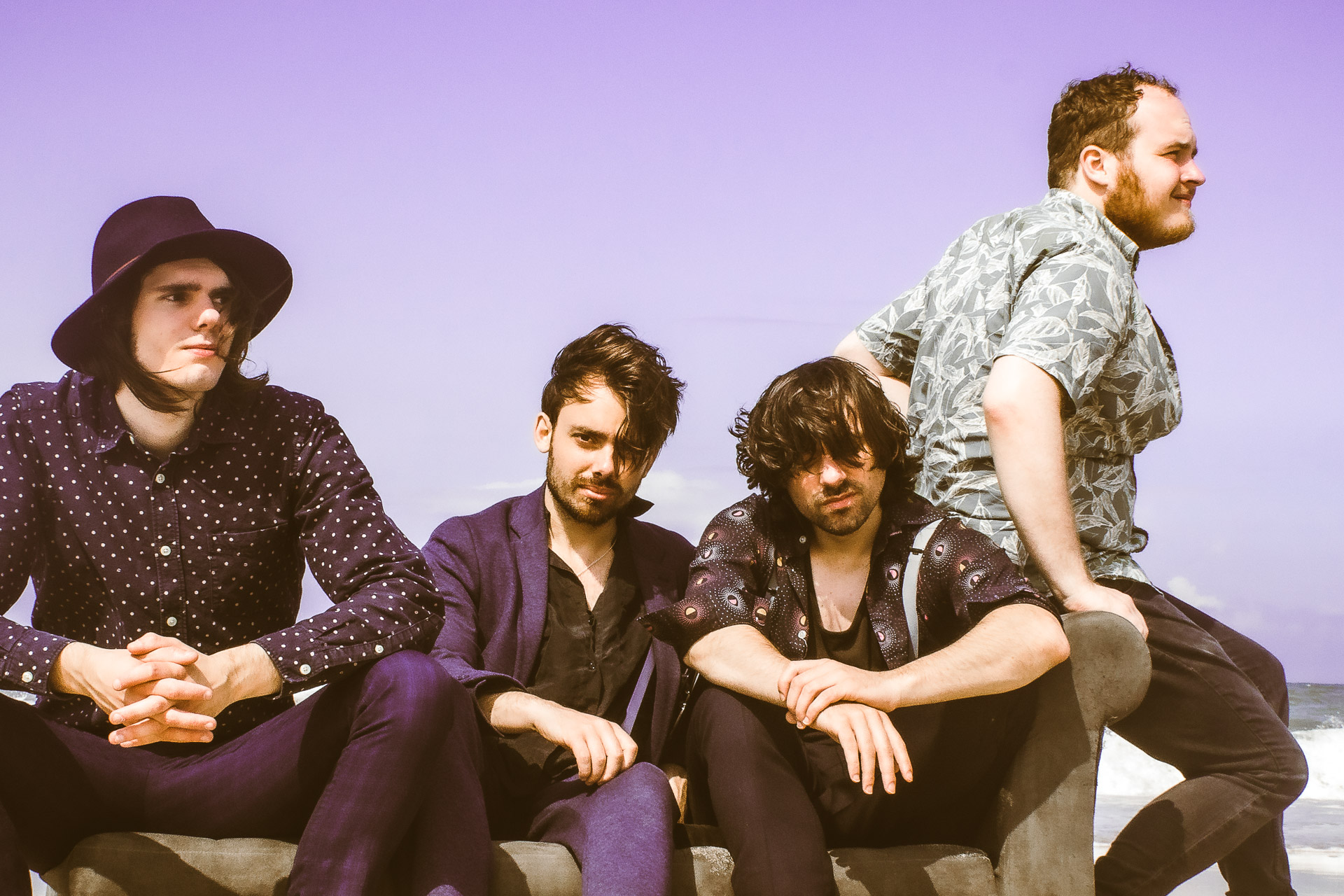
- The Bohemes, Leon Huisman, Gabriel Huisman, Nigel de Vette, Dex de Fijter

Background information
- Origin: The Hague, Netherlands
- Genres: Rock, Alternative
- Years active: 2006–present
- Members: Léon Huisman guitar/vocal Nigel de Vette guitar Dex de Fijter bass guitar Gabriël Huisman drums
- Website: thebohemes.nl

The Bohemes are an alternative indie rock band from The Hague. The sound is comparable to bands such as The Libertines, Arctic Monkeys, Kings of Leon and The Jam. The band's name is taken from Arthur Rimbaud's poem Ma Bohème.

The bandmembers of The Bohemes are singer and guitarist Léon Huisman, guitarist Nigel de Vette, bassist Dex de Fijter and drummer Gabriël Huisman.

On July 21, 2020 Von Fisennepark is released on popular digital streaming services. It is the first single in the current formation of the band. Because of the intelligent lockdown in The Netherlands, the single is recorded and produced remotely.

== Highlights ==
The Bohemes were originally formed in 2006 by Léon Huisman and Milan Weekhout, who met each other at a school in Rijswijk.

Opening act Bettie Serveert
In December 2009, The Bohemes were the opening act to Bettie Serveert in about 20 popular Dutch music venues, such as 013 (Tilburg), Tivoli (Utrecht) and Paradiso (Amsterdam).

KinkTV Plug de Band
By the end of 2009, The Bohemes won KinkTV show Plug de Band. The show was aired on TMF, 3FM and KinkFM.

2019 - 2023
In 2019, The Bohemes consisted of brothers Léon en Gabriël Huisman when Nigel de Vette joins on guitar. Early 2020, Dex de Fijter joins on bass guitar.

2023-now
In 2023, in a different set up with Kevin Smits on guitar and Redmar Hiemstra on bass, The Weekend Wasteland EP was recorded.

== Discography ==
2009

- The Black & White Demos (Double album)
- I, Boheme (EP)

2010

- Up the Modern World!/Entitled (Split single)

2011

- To the Ears of the Night

2013

- Grey Demos

2020

- Von Fisennepark (single)

2020

- Would You (single)

2024

- The Weekend Wasteland (EP)
