= The Medics (Dutch band) =

Dutch rock band

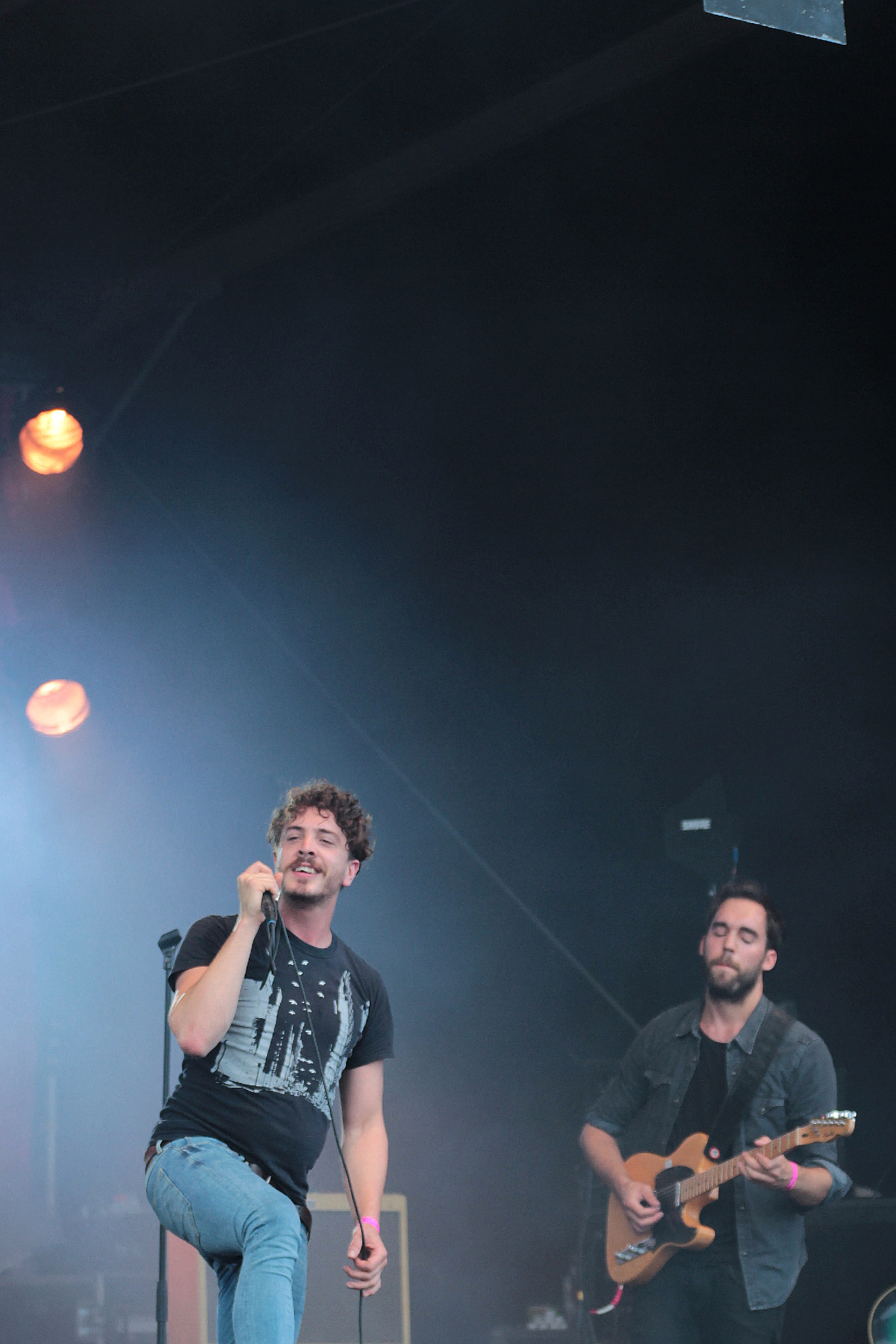
- The Medics at Uitmarkt 2014

Background information
- Origin: Utrecht, Netherlands
- Genres: pop, rock
- Years active: 2008–2015
- Labels: PIAS Recordings
- Members: Daniel Langeveld; Jarl Hector; Bryan Hokkeling; Daniel Hallin; Johan van de Werken
- Past members: Jasper Fabius; Allard Amelink; Ricardo Jupijn
- Website: themedics.nl

The Medics was a Dutch rock band. The band was founded in 2008 in Utrecht and signed in 2011 to the record label PIAS Recordings. It released its debut album Dance Into The Dark on 26 August 2011.

The Medics gained worldwide attention with their single "City". This song appeared in September 2011 on the soundtrack of FIFA 12, a soccer game by EA Sports.

== Members ==
- Daniel Langeveld - vocals
- Jarl Hector - guitar
- Daniel Hallin - keys, guitar
- Bryan Hokkeling - drums
- Johan van de Werken - bass guitar, keys, vocals

== Discography ==
- Choose Your Battle (2014)
1. "We Are Not Alone"
2. "Turnaround"
3. "Something In The Water"
4. "We Don't Ask For Much (But We'll Take It All)"
5. "Under My Skin"
6. "Breathe In/Out"
7. "A World Ago (feat. Andy Burrows)"
8. "Snapshot"
9. "Prison"
10. "Exodus"
- Dance Into The Dark (2011)
1. "Dance Into The Dark"
2. "City"
3. "Shake It Off (The Beat Goes On)"
4. "Wires"
5. "A Little Bit Of Love"
6. "I Don't Feel So Good"
7. "Word In My Heart"
8. "Gold"
9. "Water"
10. "Explode"
11. "Kill All The Lights"
12. "Body And Mind"
