= Erica, Emmen =

Erica
- Town
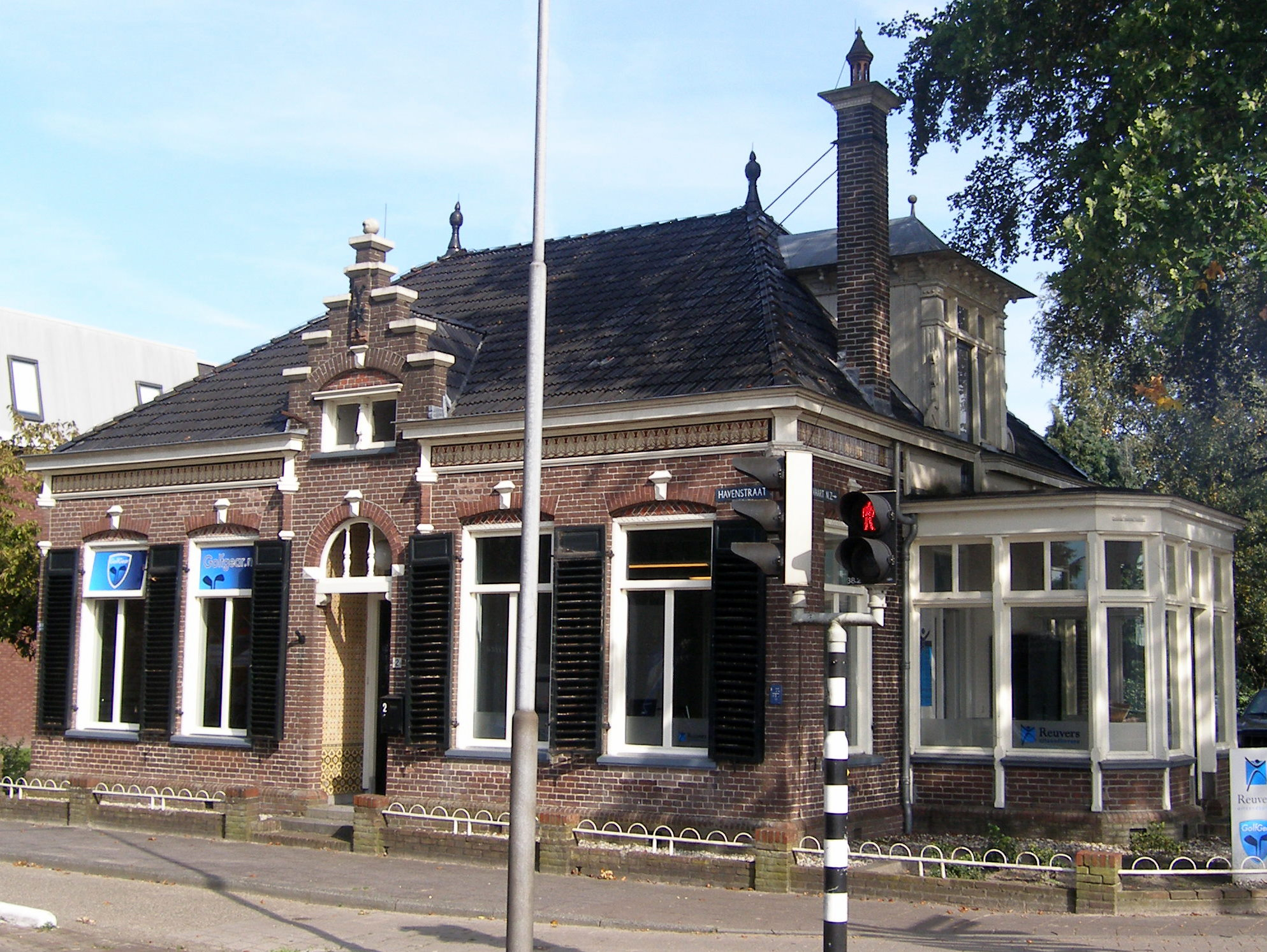

- Location in province of Drenthe in the Netherlands Erica (Netherlands)
- Coordinates: 52.71532°N 6.92596°E
- Country: Netherlands
- Province: Drenthe
- Municipality: Emmen
- Established: 1863

Area
  - Total: 24.53 km^{2} (9.47 sq mi)
- Elevation: 16 m (52 ft)

Population (2021)
  - Total: 4,740
  - Density: 193/km^{2} (500/sq mi)
- Time zone: UTC+1 (CET)
  - Summer (DST): UTC+2 (CEST)
- Postal code: 7887
- Dialing code: 0591

Erica is a town in the north-eastern Netherlands. It is located in Emmen, Drenthe. It started as a peat and buckwheat colony.

== History ==
Erica was established in 1863. The first inhabitant came from Slagharen. A fuel shortage prompted large-scale efforts to drain the peat in the area and cut them for fuel. People were drawn to the area and canals were dug, both to drain the peat and to transport the cuts. Buckwheat was farmed on the drained peats. It was originally called Nieuw-Slagharen, but has been renamed Erica after the heath plant.

Erica started as a linear settlement. In 1867, the Hoogeveense Vaart was dug, and a second settlement was constructed. Later, the two were merged. Many of the early inhabitants of Erica came from neighbouring Germany and were Roman Catholic, and in 1866, a Catholic church was built. The current church dates from 1933. In 1932, Erica was home to 2,663 people.

In 1897, the windmill De Heidebloem was constructed. It was restored in 1978, and is still in use to grind grain. In the 1960s, greenhouse cultivation started in Erica. Erica can reached via the A37 motorway.

== Gallery ==
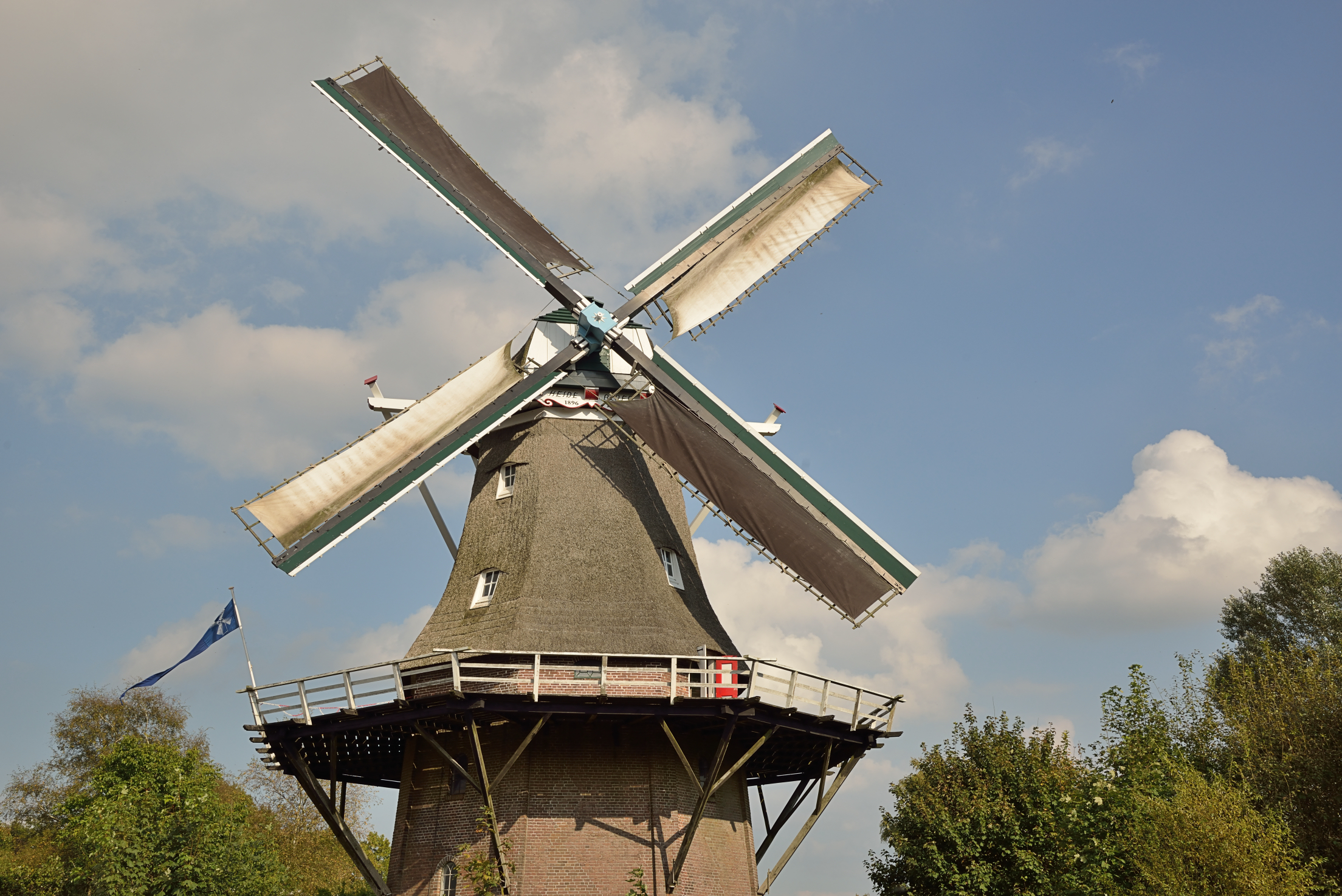
Mill De Heidebloem

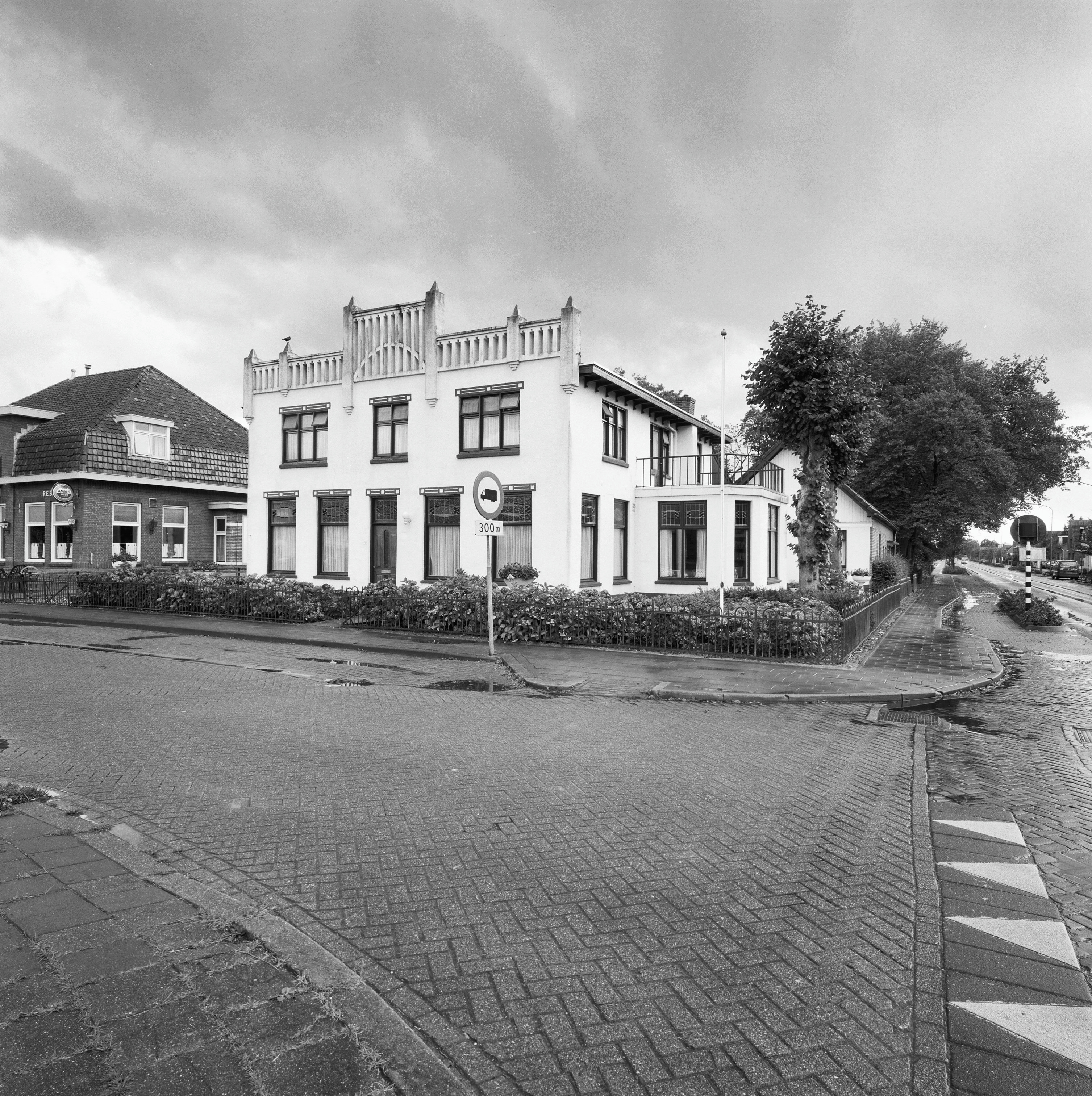
Jugendstil house in Erica

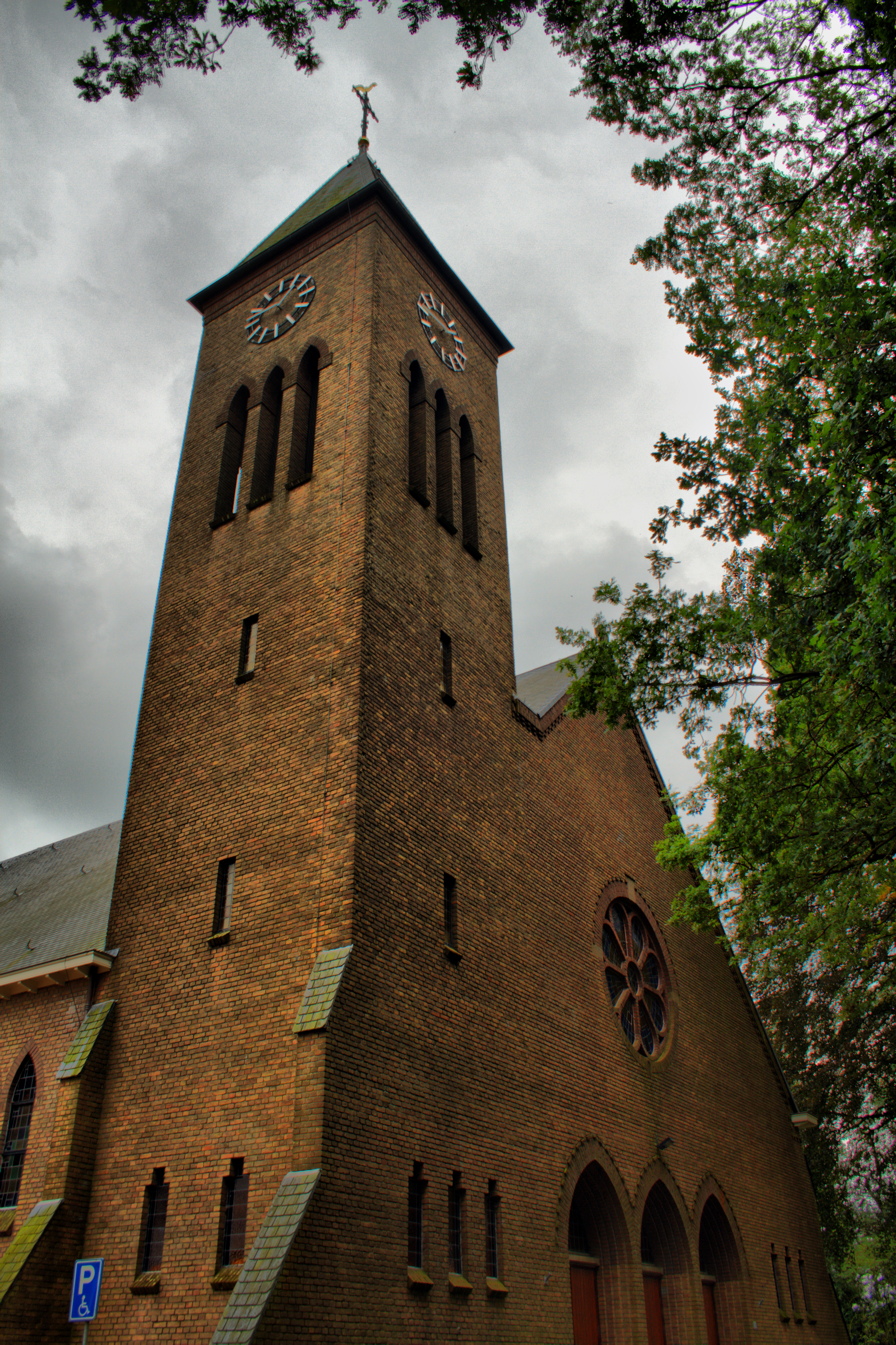
Church

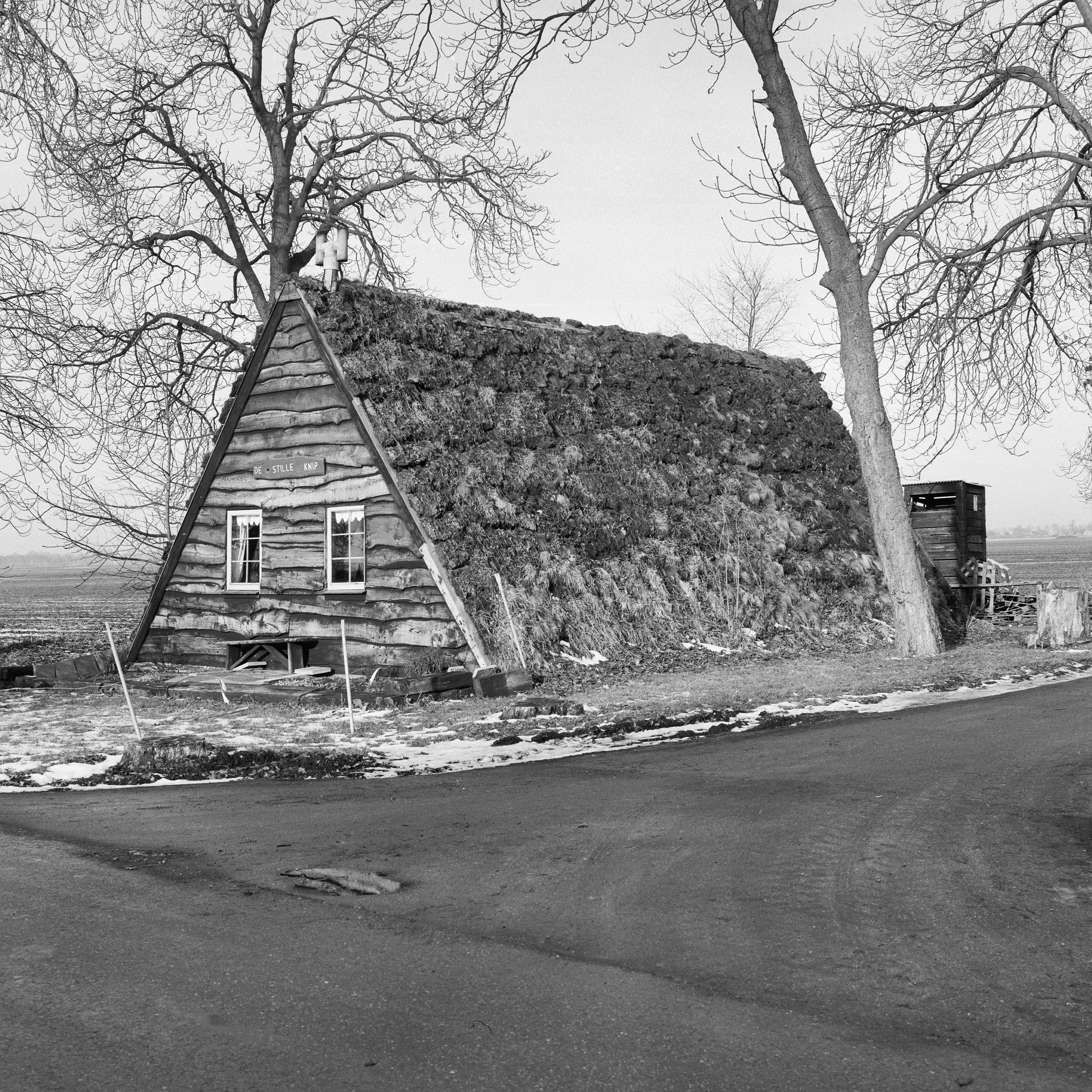
Sod house near the canal (1997)
