= Mo'Jones =

Dutch band

Mo'jones
- Origin: Netherlands
- Genres: Funk, soul, pop
- Years active: 2000–present
- Labels: Inbetweens Records
- Members: Ron van der Burgt; Jan van der Burgt; Bart Oostindie; Mike Roelofs

Mo'jones is a band from Sittard, Netherlands. It is formed by the brothers Mo' (Jan van der Burgt) and Skinnie (Ron van der Burgt). Their genre is a mix between funk, soul and pop

== Discografie ==
=== Albums ===
- Mo'Jones (2000)
- Strong Man (2002)
- My World (2005)
- Middle Aged Angry Young Man (2007)

=== Singles ===
- Where the sun stopped shining (2001).
- Little love songs (2002)
- You cannot stop me (2002)
- Revolution (2003)
- How the wind blows (2003)
- Always the Same (2005)
