= The Serenes =

Dutch rock band

- Origin: Joure, Friesland, Netherlands
- Genres: Jangle pop, alternative rock
- Years active: 1988–1994
- Labels: Integrity, RCA
- Members: Theo de Jong (musician); Joan Hooghiemstra; Pyter Kuipers; Wieb Zigtema; Jacob Veenstra
- Past members: Paul Dokter; Ale Bosma

The Serenes were a rock band from Joure, Friesland, Netherlands. They formed in 1988 and disbanded in 1994. Their jangle pop music is comparable with the music of bands like The Feelies, The Chills and the early sound of R.E.M. The sound of their guitars and vocals are best described as bright and clean. Their songs contain melancholy English lyrics, inspired by the serenity and loneliness of the silent and flat sceneries of Friesland. Both of their albums are well recognized by Dutch music critics, and still have a top status in the history of the Dutch underground scene.

== First album ==
Barefoot and Pregnant, their first album, was released in 1990. This album contains 10 tracks, of which Rebecca (You're Gonna Be Allright) was the first single, Abiding Place was the second.

== Second album ==
Their second and final album, Back to Wonder, was released in 1993 and contains 11 tracks. Three tracks were released as a single: Every Sunday, Feel Me and Here. Ale Bosma had been replaced by Pyter Kuipers. Paul Dokter left the band before the album was recorded.

== Original line up ==
- Theo de Jong (musician) - Guitar and Vocals
- Paul Dokter - Guitar and Vocals
- Ale Bosma - Bass
- Joan Hooghiemstra - Drums

== Discography ==
- Barefoot and Pregnant (album) (Integrity, 1990)
- Back to Wonder (album) (BMG, 1993)
