= Smogus =

Dutch nu metal band

Smogus was a rock music band in the Netherlands, active from 1999 to 2006.

The band played nu metal music. It was founded by four school friends named Jaap, Ruben, Daniel and Jeroen. During the recording of their first album, Everybody's Fucked Up Twice, they met Arno Dreef and Wiebe van den Ende who joined the band. The band members are Jaap van Duijvenbode (Guitar), Ruben Bandstra (Drums), Daniel de Jongh (Vocals), Wiebe van den Ende (Raps/Vocals), Jeroen Bax (Bass), Arno Dreef (Guitar). The band has won an Essent Award and played at festivals such as Ozzfest and Lowlands.

They released two tracks on a split EP on vinyl on the WOTNXT label. In 2002, the band signed a deal with BMG and released a 6-track EP. They then released No Matter What The Outcome on The Electric Co., a Dutch label focused on Dutch talent and linked to Universal Music.

== Discography ==
- Everybody's Fucked Up Twice (2000)
- Griffin EP (2000)
- Smogus EP (2002)
- No Matter What The Outcome (2004)
- Live & Unplugged (2005)
