= Fabchannel.com =

Website

Fabchannel
- Website type: Video on demand
- Available in: English
- Owner: Fabchannel
- Creator: Justin Kniest (CEO)
- Website: www.fabchannel.com
- Commercial: No
- Launched: 2000
- Current status: Inactive (as of March 13, 2009)

Fabchannel.com was a Dutch company that aimed to give attention to artists unrecognized by the mass media. The project was founded by Justin Kniest in 2000 in collaboration with internet service provider XS4ALL and broadcast facility company N.O.B.

The website streamed free, live, and on-demand video from the Paradiso, Melkweg venues in Amsterdam, the Netherlands and The Roxy Theatre venue in Los Angeles.

With more than 900 live concerts, festivals, performances, debates and lectures, Fabchannel.com built a substantial concert video archive, their claim of being 'the largest concert video archive in the world' however being an exaggeration, given the far larger archives developed by major broadcasters such as BBC.

In April 2007 Fabchannel announced that it has launched its own channel on Joost, an online TV distribution platform. This channel, The Best Of Fab, shows a selection of the archive.

In November 2007, the city of Amsterdam and Foreman Capital each took a 25% share in Fabchannel. The city of Amsterdam paid 1.25 million euro for the share.

In February 2008 Fabchannel and Universal Music Netherlands announced a recording and multi-territory digital exploitation partnership for concert videos. This was a breakthrough for Fabchannel as this meant Fabchannel was able to record and stream concerts of artists signed by Universal. Despite this deal, the business model underlying Fabchannel proved difficult to maintain, with no clear source of direct revenue from the end users (viewers), and with copyright holders (artists and/or record labels) being reluctant to allow premium value content to be streamed for free. Moreover, notwithstanding tight security measures, Fabchannel content got pirated on places like YouTube and Peer-to-Peer filesharing networks.

On March 6, 2009, Kniest announced that the site would be shutting down the following Friday, March 13. In an email to subscribers titled "Fabchannel Stops." Kniest wrote:

"After nine passionate and beautiful years of sharing the most amazing concert recordings with you, Fabchannel is stopping. ... With a bleeding heart we're pulling the plug of our online archive Friday 13th of March. Until that time, enjoy your favorite concerts and who knows - we'll meet again.

== Awards ==
- Spin Award: Winner Best Dutch Website Concept of 2003
- EuroPrix.nl: Overall Winner Best Dutch E-Content Production 2005
- Prix Europa: Winner Best European Website 2005
- Webby Awards: Winner Best Music Website 2006
- Musikexpress Style Award: Winner Best Media 2007
- W3 Silver Award: Winner 2007
- Best Dutch entertainment website of the year 2008
