= Yukka =

Dutch pop/rock band

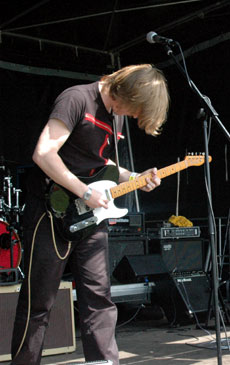
Guitar player Arjan Brentjes, Geuzenpop festival - Enschede, May 22, 2005

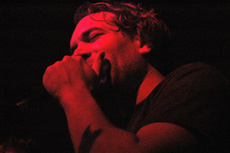
Singer Jasper Slaghuis, Willemeen - Arnhem, December 16, 2005

Yukka is an indie Dutch Pop/rockband, founded in 1995.

In the following years the band did almost 200 live shows, festivals, radio and television performances.

In 2005, the band released the CD Still. Two years before this, the CD It Isn't Safe was released. From this CD Yukka released a single and video. This video has been broadcast at MTV Holland and The Box.

In December 2005 guitar player Ivo Maassen joined the band.

In 2017 the band reunited and released a new EP and single in 2018.

The band provided free MP3 downloads of their music on their site. They also take advantage of Mininova's Content Distribution Service with which they have uploaded their latest album, Still, in high quality MP3 using BitTorrent.

== Band members ==
- Vocals: Jasper Slaghuis;
- Guitar: Arjan Brentjes;
- Guitar: Ivo Maassen (2005 - 2009);
- Bass guitar: Martijn Slagt;
- Drums: Jeroen Slagt.

== Albums ==
- Insane, Baby (2000, Mini CD);
- Momentopname (2001, Compilation CD released after the Enschede fireworks disaster);
- It isn't safe (2003, CD);
- Don't Be Sad (2003, CD Single);
- Dollypop (2004, CD containing recordings from the Dollypop Festival 2003);
- Still (2005, CD);
- Nederland Rockt (2008, Compilation CD with Dutch rock bands).
- Studio Moscow (2018, EP)
- Woman Has No Soul (2018, Single)

== See also ==
- Yukka web site in English
