= Zinatra =

Dutch hard rock band

- Origin: Netherlands
- Genres: Hard rock, AOR, pop rock
- Years active: 1988–1992
- Labels: NT Records, Mercury
- Spinoffs: Mennen

Zinatra was a Dutch hard rock- and AOR-band. The band released their debut album in 1988, which contained the single "Love or Loneliness", a song that was successful in the national music chart, peaking at #18. The following singles were "Somewhere" and "Lookin' for Love". Later the band was the opening act for David Lee Roth in his tour called Skyscraper. In 1989 the band performed a tour that went to Taiwan, Thailand and South America.

In 1990, Robby Valentine joined the band as keyboardist, besides participating in the compositions. In spring 1990, the second album, called The Great Escape was released and charted at #72 in the Netherlands. The first single "There She Was", reached #48 in the Netherlands. The other singles from the album, "Love Never Dies" and "Two Sides of Love", did not enter into any music chart. In 1992 Robby Valentine left the band. Later the singer Joss Mennen also left the band to form the band Mennen.

== Discography ==
=== Studio albums ===
Title	Album details	Peak chart positions
Title	Album details	NLD
Zinatra	Released: 1988; Label: NT Records	98
The Great Escape	Released: 1990; Label: Mercury	72
