= Koninklijke Nederlandse Grofsmederij =

Metal factory in Leiden, Netherlands

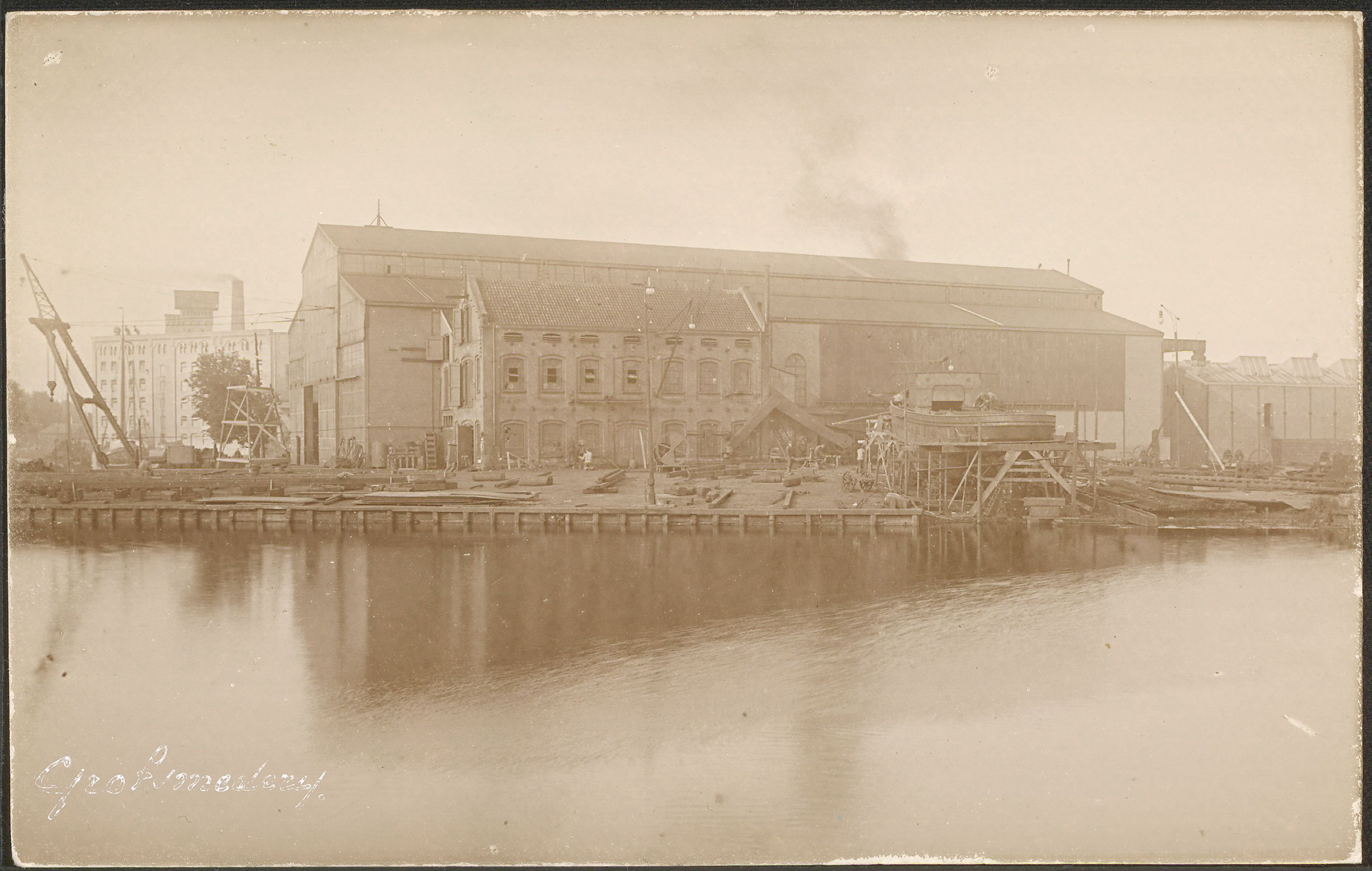
- Grofsmederij buildings viewed from Zijlsingel, in background disappeared part of flour mill
- Founded: 1836; 189 years ago
- Founder: William Archibald Bake
- Defunct: 1978
- Headquarters: Leiden, Netherlands

The N.V. Koninklijke Nederlandsche Grofsmederij was a metal factory in Leiden, Netherlands, which had various departments: forging works, iron casting, machine factory, construction works, chain factory and shipyard. The factory was in use from 1836–1978. It had two main buildings: one at the Zuidsingel near the center of Leiden, one was built in 1898 at the outskirts of the city.

== Early years ==
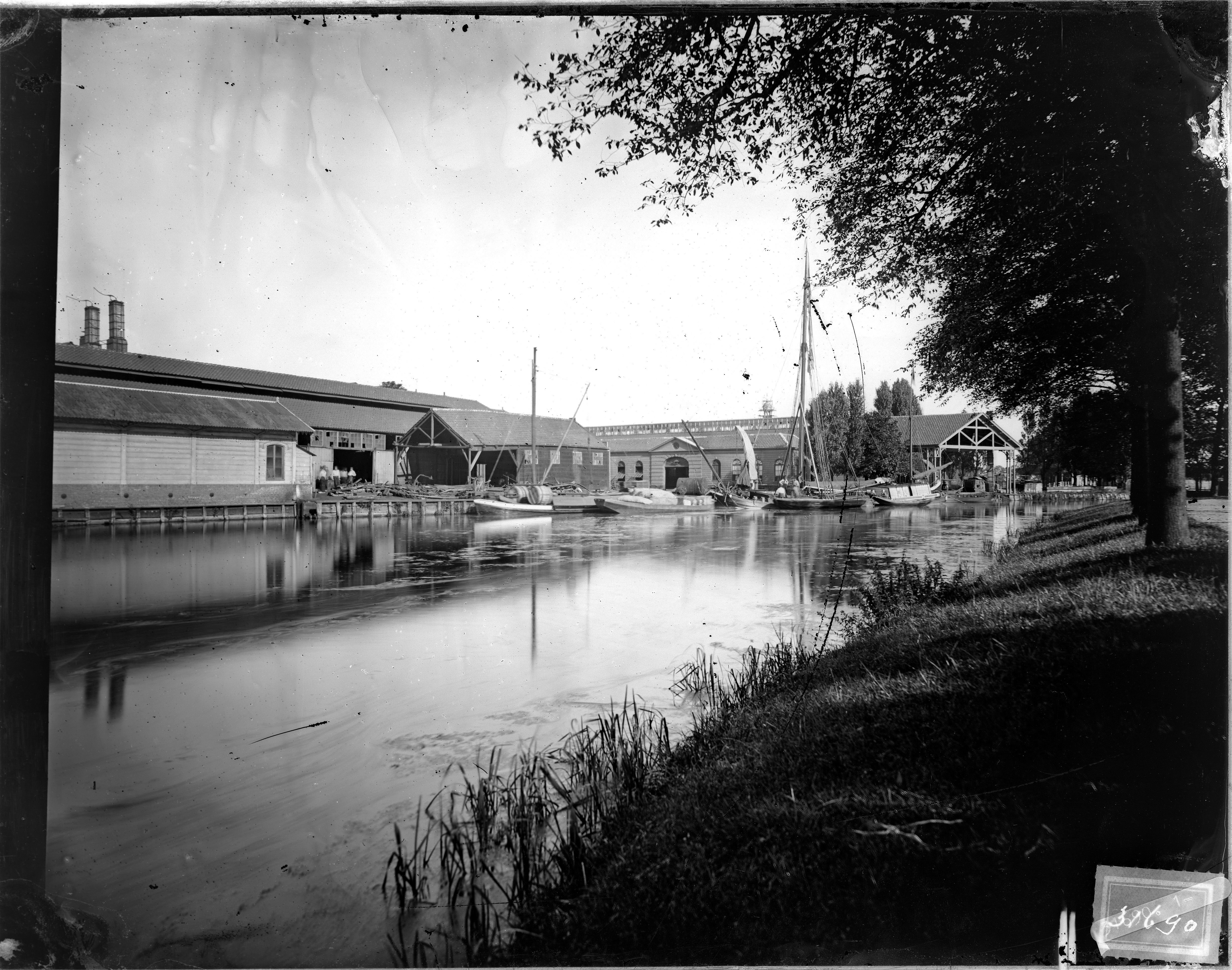
The Koninklijke Nederlandse Grofsmederij, seen to the north. Picture by Jan Goedeljee, about 1900.

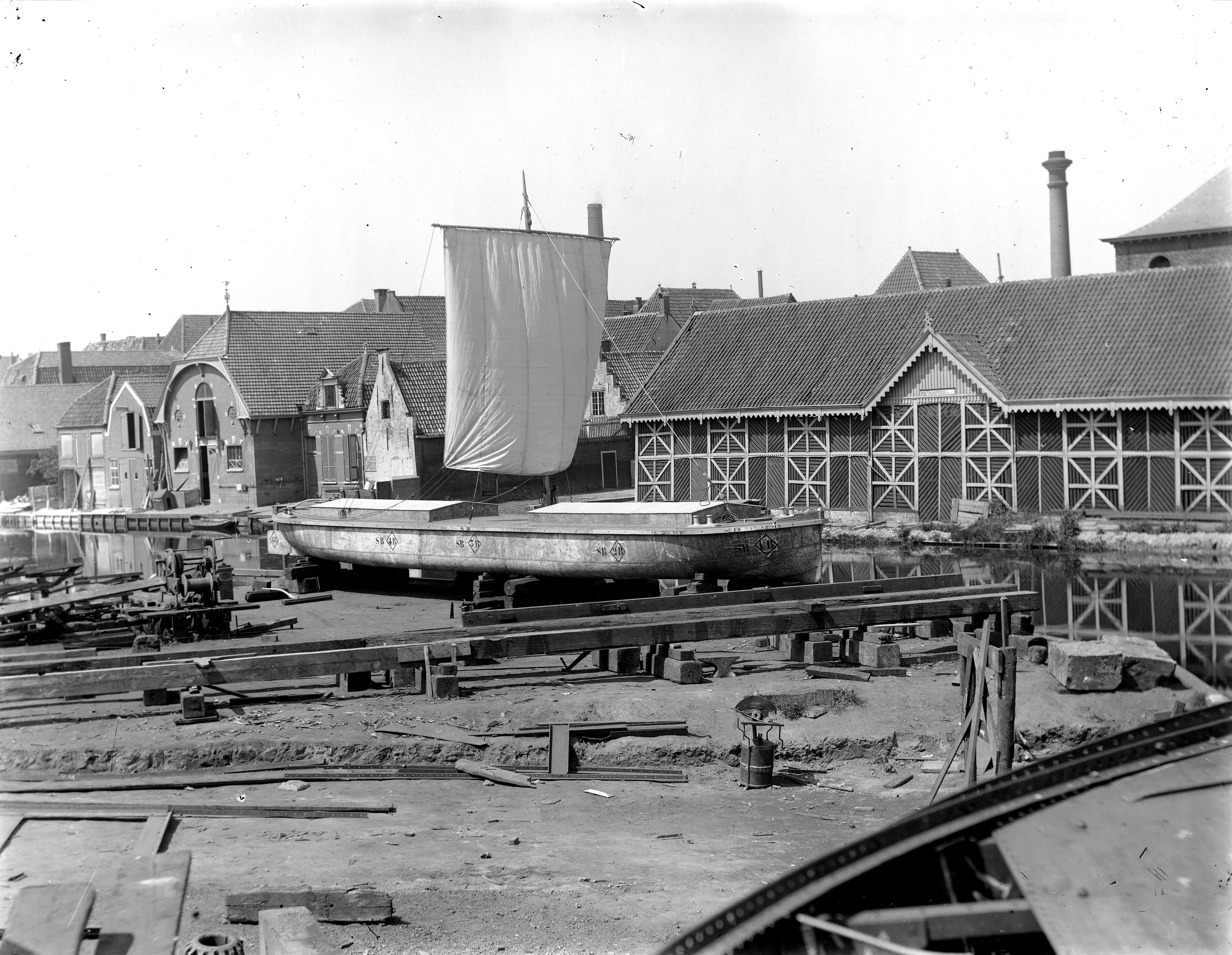
Shipyard at the Koninklijke Nederlandse Grofsmederij. Picture by Jan Goedeljee, about 1900.

=== Foundation ===
On 31 August 1836 the company was founded as the public company 'Grofsmederij' with a capital of 200,000 guilders (about £16,500). The initiative had been taken by William Archibald Bake, who had contributed to Napoleon's campaign against Russia. He had gained experience in iron works at Liège. Bake would become the first CEO. Members of the supervisory board were: Mr. A. Hartvelt, C. Leembruggen, A. Librecht Lezwijn and J.B. Bucaille.

In September 1836 K. Blansjaard got the order to erect the company's first building for 23,000 guilders. In 1836 the company's first machine was a steam engine of 47 hp (35 kW). Its primary business activities would be reforging old iron into bar stock, and producing heavy forgings.

=== Manufacture of Bar Stock ===
The business plan of the company for making bar stock out of wrought iron scrap was founded on some calculations. The Netherlands imported 13,000-14,000 tons of iron each year, and the idea was that 600 tons a year could be reforged into bar stock, in Dutch 'Sta(a)fijzer'. The bar stock would then be further processed by other metal workers, especially shipyards. The Grofsmederij was the first Dutch company to have a Rolling Mill that produced bar stock. The company was still active in this branch in the 1840s but had to give up because of the expansion of the iron industry in surrounding countries.

=== Manufacture of heavy forgings ===
The words 'heavy forgings' probably referred to forging that could not be done by the local blacksmith. Part of the rails of the 1839 Amsterdam Haarlem railway, that was exploited by the Hollandsche IJzeren Spoorweg-Maatschappij was made by the company. In the early years the company also made iron chains from the bar stock that it produced.

== Chains and anchors ==
In 1851 a factory for iron chains was established by the Grofsmederij. The company would acquire a reputation for iron chains, also for rudder chains. It also made anchors.

== Demise ==
In 1966 the company was merged with the forge part of Wilton-Fijenoord. In 1978 the merged company was closed.
