= Osdorp Posse =

Dutch rap group

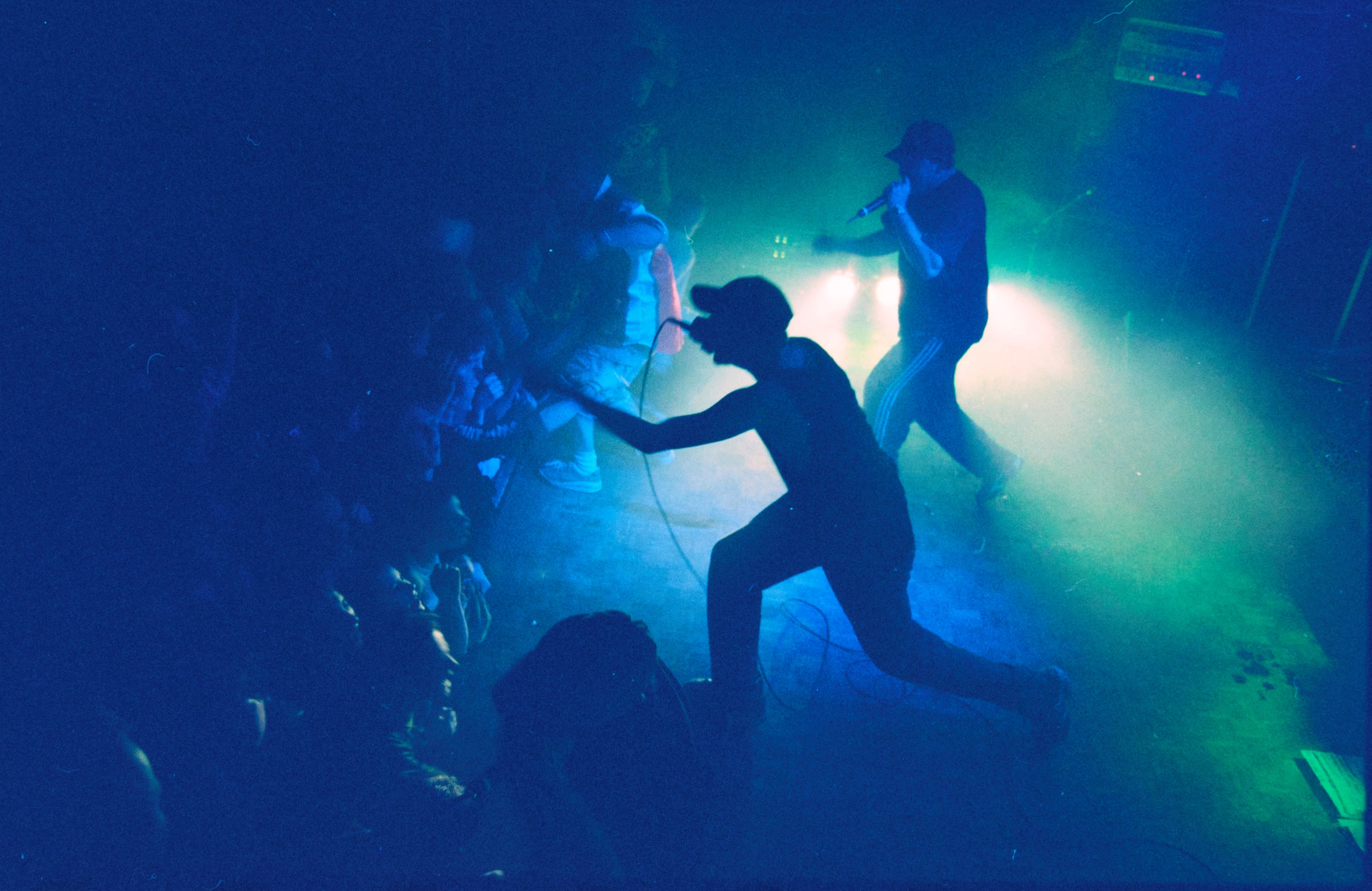
- Osdorp Posse (1999)

Background information
- Origin: Osdorp, Amsterdam, Netherlands
- Genre: Hip hop
- Years active: 1989–2009
- Label: Ramp Records
- Members: Pascal Griffioen (Def P); Robin Bezuijen (Seda); Marco Moolhuizen (IJsblok); Arthur Bezuijen (King); Daan Snouck Hurgronje (Deegmeester Daan)

The Osdorp Posse, founded in Amsterdam, Netherlands, in 1989, was the first group to make rap music in Dutch. All four members are related to each other. Influenced by gangsta rap, they made a name for themselves by combining the music of hardcore hip hop with Dutch lyrics featuring literal translations of American slang. Initially appreciated only in the Dutch underground scene, they achieved commercial success and exerted great influence on the Dutch hip hop scene. The band is additionally notable for their satirical, socially conscious lyrics.

== History ==
Their debut album Osdorp Stijl was released in 1992, and was characterized by hardcore beats combined with a hardcore message shouted out by a seemingly furious Def P. Subjects covered in their songs included commercial music ("Commerciële AIDS"), religious fanaticism ("Katholieke trut"), and the joys of drinking beer ("Bier").

In 1993 the album Roffer dan Ooit was released, and in response to the violent subject matter of the lyrics, VPRO radio DJ Lotje IJzermans accused the band of "playing ghetto":

Op deze CD staat bijvoorbeeld ook de Osdorp Posse, he. Een crew die in het Nederlands, het Amsterdams rapt. En zij doen daarop onder andere het nummer "Moordenaar!" Ja, ik denk dat dat niet echt bijdraagt aan het serieus nemen van hip-hop want dat is toch een beetje ghetto'tje spelen.

This CD also contains, for example, the Osdorp Posse. A group that raps in Dutch, actually the Amsterdam dialect. And they also perform the song "Murderer!" Yes, I think that this does not contribute to taking hip-hop seriously, because it is a bit like 'playing ghetto.'

The same year a new album was released, Vlijmscherp, and on this album the group commented about their treatment in the Dutch media. In one of the songs from the album, "Ghetto'tje spelen" ("Playing ghetto"), IJzermans was dissed by Def P.

Due to the explicit nature the group were banned all over the Dutch radio and both public and commercial radio stations refused to air music from Osdorp Posse.

This did not imply the end of Osdorp Posse, but a dramatic change in style and in 1995 Afslag Osdorp was released, which was considered by many as their finest album in which social issues like prostitution, real love, domestic abuse and religion were covered.

In 1996 the band played with death metal band Nembrionic which resulted in Briljant, Hard en Geslepen in which hip hop and metal were combined. In 1998 they started their own record label, Ramp Records. Osdorp Posse managed to get their first Top-10 hit in 2000 with the single "Origineel Amsterdams."

In 2008 the Osdorp Posse decided to prepare their last album and tour. The double CD called "2 Decennia" was released on November 13, 2008, and contains a disc with remixes of Osdorp Posse tracks and a best-of compilation disc with six new tracks, which were recorded at the LAB13 Media studio in Almere, The Netherlands. Their tour of Holland and Belgium in 2009 was their farewell.

== Other projects ==
Def P also performs as the leader of Def P & Beatbusters, an outfit blending hip hop and ska; they had a minor hit in 2001, and released a second album, Hard op weg, in 2011. In 2011 Def-P released the third "onderhonden" album with fellow mc's Casto, Das and Jerome XL (together with Jerome XL he also forms the rap duo Digibombers).

== Discography ==
=== Albums ===
- Osdorp Stijl (Osdorp Style) (1992)
- Roffer dan Ooit (Rougher than Ever) (1992)
- Vlijmscherp (Razor Sharp) (1993)
- Afslag Osdorp (Exit Osdorp) (1995)
- Briljant, Hard en Geslepen (Brilliant, Hard, and Sharpened) (1996)
- Geendagsvlieg (None Day Fly) (1997)
- Oud & Nieuw (Old and New) (1998)
- Kernramp (Nuclear Disaster) (2000)
- Tegenstrijd (Contradiction) (2003)
- Hollandse Hardcore Hiphop Helden (Dutch Heroes of Hardcore Hiphop) (2005)
- LAOS Projects (Laberinto & Osdorp Posse) (2007)
- 2 Decennia (2008) (2 CD)

=== Singles ===
- "Hardcore Leeft" (March 1994)
- "Ongeplugd" (December 1994)
- "Origineel Amsterdams" (2000)
- "Chemoderniseerd" featuring Blind Justice (2000)
- "Ik Eerst/Jongens Uit De Industrie" (2003)
- "Fok Jou!" (2003)
