= Renée (band) =

Dutch band

Renée were a Dutch band formed in 1977-1978 from the members of an earlier group, René and The Alligators led by René Nodelijk.

René and The Alligators had played venues in the Netherlands and Germany in the 1960s.
