= Odyssice =

Dutch progressive rock band

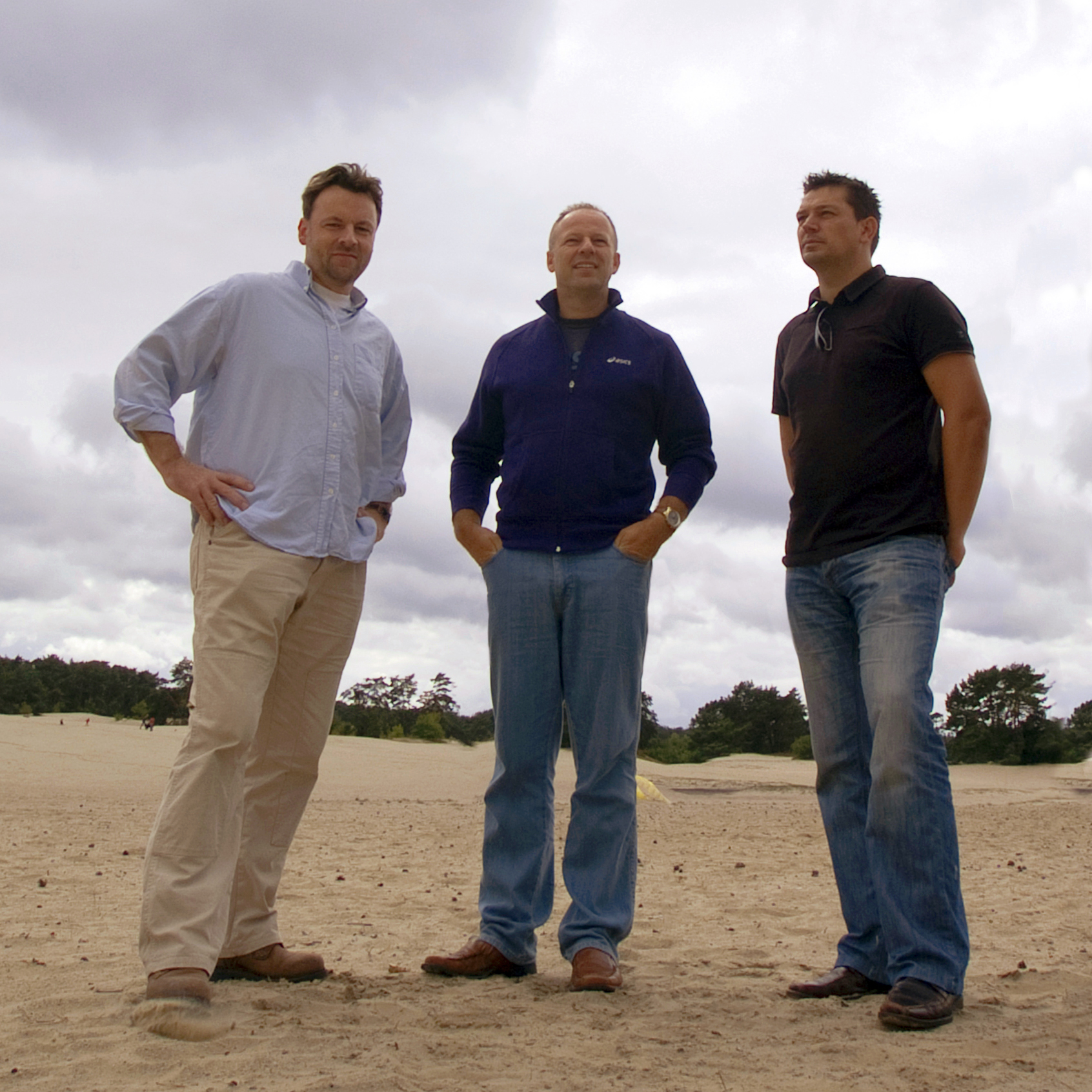
- Odyssice in 2012

Background information
- Origin: Badhoevedorp, Netherlands
- Genres: Rock; Pop; Progrock
- Years active: 1986–present
- Members: Bastiaan Peeters; Jeroen van der Wiel; Menno Boomsma; Peter Kosterman
- Past members: André Hubbeling, Alan Natele, Erik Aafjes, Bart Kühne, Pascal van de Pol
- Website: www.odyssice.com

Odyssice is a Dutch progressive rock band. The band name comes from a fantasy name associated with Greek mythology. It was founded in 1986 by Bastiaan Peeters (guitar), André Hubbeling (keyboards) and Alan Natele (drums). The group's song, "Track One" was played on the Dutch radio-show, Countdown Café, in 1987. Well known bands such as IQ, Pendragon and Oblique had tracks played on this radio-show.

== First release ==
The first changes in band membership occurred in 1989. Bart Kühne replaced Alan Natele, plus Erik Aafjes was added on bass. "Losing Her" was their new track on the Exposure compilation album from the magazine Sym-Info. The interest lad to an invitation to perform at a Sym-Infos festival at 't Noorderligt in Tilburg on 16 June 1989.

The band was successful, but musical differences caused them to disappear from spotlight for some time. Then Peeters and Kühne decided to reincarnate Odyssice with new members. After a long period, Odyssice became a quartet again. The band became complete with the addition of bassist Pascal van de Pol and keyboardist Jeroen van der Wiel.

== Debut album ==
Their debut CD was released in 1997. The mini-album, Moondrive was well received across the globe. However, Kühne decided to leave the band at the end of 1997; he was replaced by Menno Boomsma. The release of Moondrive was followed by a series of concerts, commencing at the first ProgFarm in Bakkeveen, Tivoli (ProgWorld), De Lantaarn (SympHel) and Hedon (with Pallas) followed shortly after.

== New millennium ==
After two fruitful years and a sold out album, Odyssice decided to take it slow in 1999. They worked on new material for the follow-up to Moondrive. The new songs were finished at the end of that same year and, in January 2000, the recording of Impression took place. Shortly after the recording contract was signed with Cyclops Records, Impression was released worldwide on 1 November 2000.

In 2001, there were two performances in which Odyssice played tracks from both Moondrive and Impression. By mid-2002, van de Pol decided to leave the band and focus on a completely different style of music, leaving Boomsma, Peeters and van der Wiel without a bassist. In June 2003, the Moondrive album was re-issued, which contained a multimedia part with live videos.

At the end of 2004, Odyssice finally decided to employ Peter Kosterman as their new bass player.

On 23 May 2010, their new album, Silence, was released. It received a 'vette krent' (highly recommendated) noting in the Dutch progressive music magazine, IO-Pages. Before the recording processes began, the band made a live television recording at RTV-NoordHolland. The DVD of this session will be released in 2011. Odyssice undertook a number of concerts in October 2010, including at 'de Boerderij' in Zoetermeer, Netherlands.

== Discography ==
- 1986: Track One (cassette)
- 1989: Live In Tilburg (cassette)
- 1997: Moondrive
- 2000: Impression (reissued in 2013 with bonus-cd)
- 2003: Moondrive Plus
- 2010: Silence
