= Cesair =

Dutch band

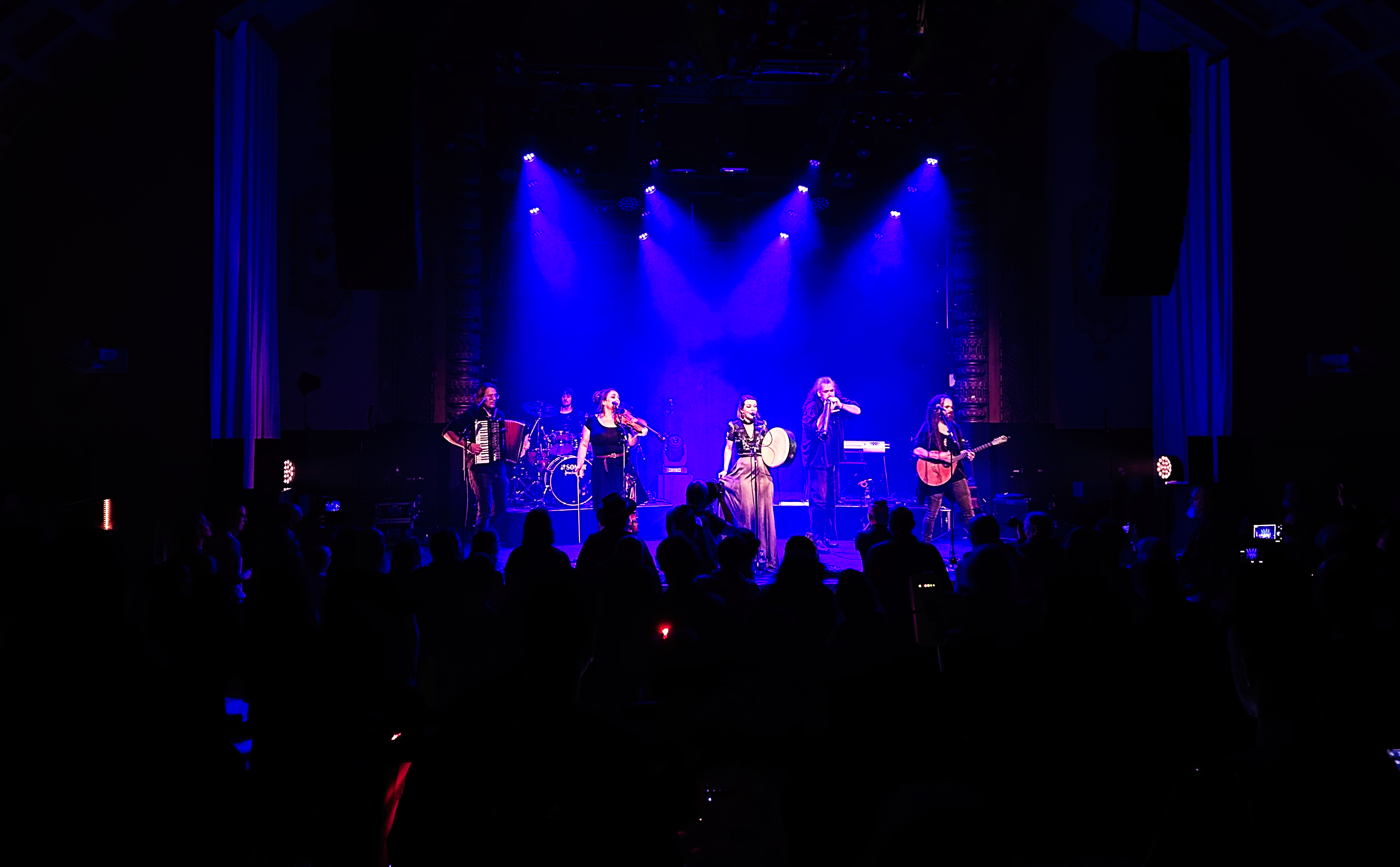
- Cesair in Arnhem (2024)

Background information
- Origin: Utrecht, Netherlands
- Genres: Pagan folk World fusion World music
- Years active: 2008–present
- Labels: Screaming Banshee, Alive AG, Miroque GmbH
- Members: Monique van Deursen, Sophie Zaaijer, Thomas Biesmeijer, Luka Aubri, Daan van Loon
- Past members: Fieke van den Hurk
- Website: www.cesair.nl

Cesair is a Dutch band formed in 2008 who make pagan folk, world fusion and world music. They are the main representatives of the pagan folk music scene in the Netherlands, alongside pagan folk band Omnia. The band refer to their genre as "Epic Folk & Mythic Music". They perform on a variety of modern and traditional instruments, including accordion, hurdy-gurdy, hammered dulcimer, Irish bouzouki, violin, cello, bodhrán and many others. Their songs are performed in a variety of languages ranging from Arabic, medieval Celtic languages, English, Latin, Greek, to Middle Dutch, Old Norse and more.

== History ==
The band was founded in 2008 in Utrecht. In 2011, they were joined by drummer Jan de Vries. In the years following, the band have performed at numerous notable alternative, gothic and medieval music festivals in Europe, including Festival-Mediaval, Wave-Gotik-Treffen, Mittelalterlich Phantasie Spectaculum and Trolls et Légendes, and have headlined at Castlefest, the largest pagan/fantasy festival in Europe, for several years. In 2016, the band announced that founding member Fieke van den Hurk would leave the band, which she did in early 2017. End of March 2017, the band announced that Luka Aubri, formerly a member of Omnia, and Faber Horbach would join the band.

=== Members ===
- Monique van Deursen – vocals, bodhrán, frame drum, zills, hurdy-gurdy
- Sophie Zaaijer – vocals, violin, viola, cello, jew's harp
- Thomas Biesmeijer – vocals, Irish bouzouki, guitars, frame drum
- Luka Aubri – vocals, slideridoo (2017–present)
- Daan van Loon – vocals, piano, accordion (2019–present)

=== Former members ===
- Fieke van den Hurk – accordion, hammered dulcimer, hurdy-gurdy (2008–2017)
- Faber Horbach – vocals, nyckelharpa, piano (2017–2019)
- Jan de Vries – drums and other percussion instruments (2012–2022)

== Style ==
=== Music ===
Cesair's music is described as "Pagan Folk", as well as "a mixture of folk and ethnic music from the Orient". The band have expressed having some difficulty with the term pagan folk, explaining that "the term 'pagan' implies that the music has a certain spiritual concept, or is aimed against certain religions, which is not what they stand for". Instead, they use the moniker "Epic Folk & Mythic Music".

Cesair's debut album, entitled Dies, Nox et Omnia, was recorded in the Wisseloord Studios in Hilversum and features a guest appearance by Sonja Drakulich from Stellamara / FAUN. In May 2015, a special edition of the band's debut album was released through Miroque GmbH / Alive AG / Screaming Banshee Records, entitled Dies, Nox et Omnia: Sine Fine. This edition was remastered by Grammy Award winner Darcy Proper in the Wisseloord Studios and features remixes by the bands Corvus Corax and Schwarzblut and by Niel Mitra from FAUN.

=== Lyrics ===
The band's lyrics are written and sung in various languages, including Arabic, medieval Celtic languages, Spanish, Romance, Swedish, Occitan, Old English, Latin, Greek, to Middle Dutch, Old Norse and more. Besides using original lyrics the band adopts historical, classical and medieval texts such as the Enûma Eliš (Enuma Elish), the Carmina Burana (Dies, Nox et Omnia) and works from Gaston Fébus (Canso), Sappho (Graeica), Aneirin (Y Gododdin) and modern authors such as William Butler Yeats (The Wanderings of Oisín).

=== Meaning of the name ===
The name Cesair derives from Cessair, a character from the Lebor Gabála Érenn, a medieval Christian pseudo-history of Ireland. According to the band, "the adventures of this heroic woman are in many ways interwoven into their songs, and offer numerous possibilities for exploration, since Cesair herself allegedly explored the entire known world".

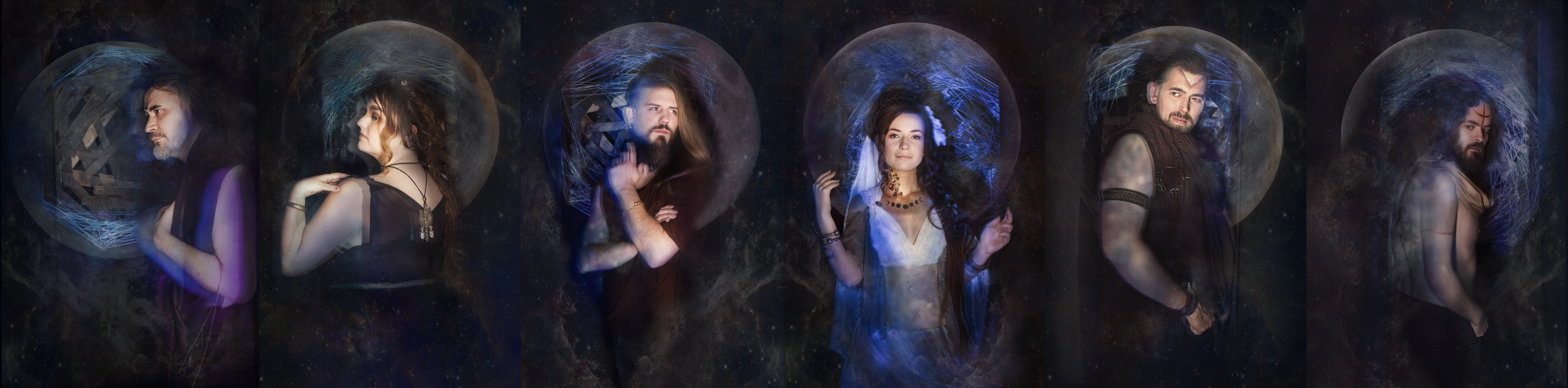
The band Cesair (Netherlands)

== Discography ==
=== Studio albums ===
| Year | Title |
|---|---|
| 2013 | Dies, Nox et Omnia |
| 2015 | Dies, Nox et Omnia: Sine Fine |
| 2017 | Omphalos |
| 2024 | Haven |
| 2025 | Haven: Reflections |

Band members Sophie Zaaijer and Fieke van den Hurk appear as guest musicians on the Leaves' Eyes' album King of Kings

=== Singles ===
| Year | Title |
|---|---|
| 2021 | Aux Pieds Nus |
