= Ilion (Thessaly) =

Ilion (Ancient Greek: Ἴλιον) was a town in ancient Thessaly. It is unlocated.
