= Mr. Review =

Dutch ska revival band

- Origin: Amsterdam
- Genres: ska
- Years active: 1983–2016
- Labels: Unicorn Records
- Members: Arne Visser; Dr.Rude; Roel Ording; Chris van der Meer; Rob Soria; Johan Steevens; Pier Borkent; Sander Loog; Annemieke Henrichs
- Website: Official website

Mr. Review is a Dutch ska revival band, formed by Roel Ording and Arne Visser in 1983 in Amsterdam. They were active from 1983 to 1998, when the band officially dissolved. Three years later the band was reformed and has remained active until present.

Drummer Roel Ording and guitarist Arne Visser had been in a band before, when they met singer Dr. Rude. They soon found a keyboardist and a saxophone player. Arne Visser was always the main songwriter. Concerts in local pubs were followed by a contract at Unicorn Records in London, which released the album Walking Down Brentford Road was released. Brentford Road is the address of Jamaica's Studio One, where many ska and reggae legends recorded songs. The band travelled to perform at many festivals in Europe. In 1994, they recorded their second album, Lock, Stock and Barrel. In 1995, their live album Keep The Fire Burning followed. After the band stopped playing together, Arne Visser and Dr. Rude continued in a new band called Rude & Visser.

In 2009, the name Rude & Visser was switched back to Mr. Review. In November 2010, Mr. Review released a new album XXV. Mr Review played their last gig on the This is Ska Festival in 2016 in Roßlau/Germany.

== Discography ==
- 1989: Walkin' Down Brentford Road - Studio album (Unicorn Records/Grover Rec.)
- 1994: Lock, Stock & Barrel - Studio album (Grover Rec.)
- 1995: The street where I'm living - Single (Grover Rec.)
- 1995: Keep the fire burning - Live album (Grover Rec.)
- 1998: One Way Ticket to Skaville - Best-of compilation (Moon Records)
- 2002: Red Rum - as Rude & Visser
- 2010: XXV
