= Def P & Beatbusters =

Dutch music group

- Origin: Amsterdam, Netherlands & Betuwe, Netherlands
- Genres: Old school hip hop and 2 Tone (Ska)
- Years active: 2001–2002
- Label: EMI
- Members: Pascal Griffioen (Def P); Amenti (Niels Hermkens); Marco Toro; Mad Saxo (Wim Van De Manacker); Jos Van Den Heuvel; Theo Jacobs; Wouter Hakhoff; Deegmeester Daan; Dutchflower (Anthony Tolsma); Erik Irie; Zendur (Sander De Haan)

Def P & Beatbusters is a Dutch music group consisting of rapper Def P of the Amsterdam old-school hip-hop band Osdorp Posse and ska band Beatbusters from the rural Betuwe region of the Netherlands.

Def P started his solo career in 1999 with the album Cryptokilostijl. During a concert at Lowlands he was accompanied by several musicians from Beatbusters and they already discussed whether Dutch rap, ska and reggae could be combined and in September 1999 they performed four concerts in Italy together. They decide to call the combination of the two styles "Skank-hop." Since both groups had their own label (Ramp Records and Boombax Music respectively) it was decided to put the combination at EMI.

== History ==
In the spring of 2001 the first single was launched, called "Stad & Land" (City and country), to indicate that the music was the product of an urban rapper and a rural ska band. The single was moderately successful, but it did not chart. The single was not the band's priority, either, since it was meant as an introduction to a tour program. In the autumn of 2001 the album Aangenaam (=Pleasant) was released, which was produced by Frans Hendriks in Studio Zeezicht. From then on the number of bookings for performances increased and resulted in an extensive 18-month tour.

The record label EMI saw commercial interest in further promoting the album given the success of the tour and released the single "Bubbelbad" (=Bubblebath). This song was a parody on the existing pop culture of all looks and no contents, however it is rumored that the extensive list of female singers (Vengaboys, TLC, Jennifer Lopez, All Saints, Cindy Crawford, Mariah Carey, Destiny's Child, etc.) featured in the song is also a personal preference of Def P. The song became a hit and peaked at #11 in the Top 40.

Because of this hit Def P & Beatbusters was booked on the prestigious Pinkpop festival and many other festivals like Lowlands, Bospop and Uitmarkt followed. In the June 2002 a live double CD from the Pinkpop festival was released called "Wrijving" (=Friction) and a videoclip was made to promote the single.

In December 2002 the band stopped performing after 85 shows with a last sold-out concert and has gone its separate way again with Beatbusters and Osdorp Posse respectively. In 2008 they started performing together again, after some loose collaborations, which resulted in the 2011 album Hard op Weg.

== Discography ==
| Year | Title | Chart | Comments |
Albums
| 2001 | Aangenaam | - | |
| 2011 | Hard op Weg | - | |
Singles
| 2001 | "Stad & Land" | - | Released by Ramp Records |
| 2002 | "Bubbelbad" | NL #11 | |
| 2002 | "Wrijving" | - | Live double single |
| 2011 | "Crisis" (Single) | - | |
| 2011 | "Hard Op Weg" (Album) | - | |
| 2015 | "Ssshhh!" (Single) | - | |
| 2015 | "Gloeiende Plaat" (Ep) | - | |
| 2015 | "Gloeiende Mixtape" (Mixed by DJ DNS & Deejay Irie) | - | |
