= Ilium (Epirus) =

Ancient Greek city

Coordinates: 39°44′20″N 20°33′57″E

Epirus in antiquity

Ilium or Ilion (Ancient Greek: Ἴλιον), also known as Troja (Τροΐα), was a city of ancient Epirus. It is mentioned in the Aeneid of Virgil as a foundation of Helenus after the Trojan War in the land of the Chaonia.

Its site is located near the modern village of Despotiko in Greece. The village was formerly known as Kretsounista.

== See also ==
- List of cities in ancient Epirus
