= Iliad (disambiguation) =

The Iliad is an epic poem attributed to Homer.

Iliad may also refer to:

- iLiad, an e-book reading device
- Iliad SA, a French telecommunications provider
  - Iliad Italia, an Italian telecommunications operator, subsidiary of the above
- Iliad Glacier, Antarctica
- Iliad, a derivative of the IBM 801 processor
- Iyad Shalabi (born 1987), Israeli Paralympic swimmer
- The nickname for the rivalry between the USC Trojans and the Michigan State Spartans
- The Iliad Bookshop

== See also ==
- J. D. Frazer, comic artist and writer who writes under the pen name Illiad
