= Ileum (band) =

Dutch grunge rock band

iLEUM
- Origin: Heerhugowaard, Netherlands
- Genres: Grunge, stoner rock
- Years active: 2006–2010
- Labels: Independent
- Past members: Bas de Vries; Frank de Vries; Michel Giardina; Sander Spoor; Rob Bosdijk
- Website: http://ileum.nl/

Ileum (stylized as iLEUM) was a Dutch grunge rock band. In January 2010, iLEUM announced on their website that they would disband.

== Biography ==
The name of the band was chosen as a reference to Rob Bosdijk, who suffers from Crohn's disease. After having participated at different music contests during 2006 the Dutch grunge formation headed into the studio to record their first full-length album, Diagnosed, in 2007; the album was released on 1 February 2008.

After the departure of Rob Bosdijk in autumn 2008, Sander Spoor joined the band as the new bassist, with Michel Giardina taking over as secondary guitar. The band participated in music competition The Next Stage, managing to reach the finales, which were held at De Melkweg in Amsterdam on 13 June 2009.

While iLEUM did record a second full-length album, they never officially released it, due to disbanding. "Summer, High, Love, Sweat!" could be listened to on their Hyves profile page. The members decided to disband in January 2010, for unknown reasons. Their final performance was in May 2010.

== Line-up ==
=== Final line-up ===
- Bas de Vries - Guitar, vocals (2006–2010)
- Frank de Vries - Drums, vocals (2006–2010)
- Michel Giardina – Guitar (2008–2010), bass guitar (2006–2008)
- Sander Spoor - Bass guitar (2008–2010)

=== Previous members ===
- Rob Bosdijk - Vocals, guitar (2006–2008)

== Discography ==
=== Studio albums ===
- Diagnosed (2008)
- Summer, High, Love, Sweat! (Unreleased, recorded 2009)
