= Paradiso (Amsterdam) =

Music venue in the Netherlands

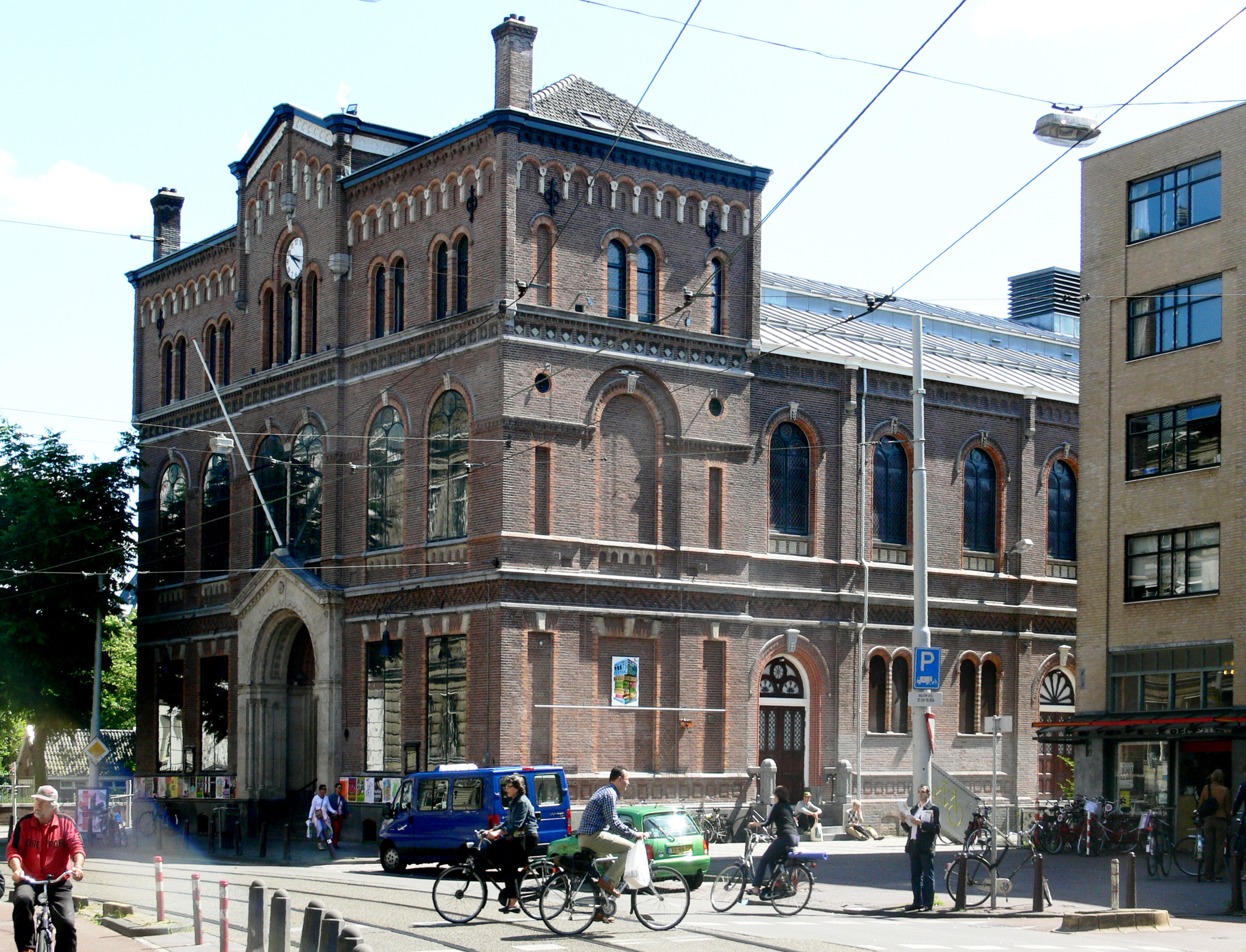
- Paradiso in 2008

- Location within Amsterdam
- Former names: Cosmisch Ontspanningscentrum Paradiso

General information
- Status: music venue
- Location: Weteringschans 6-8, Amsterdam, Netherlands
- Coordinates: 52°21′44″N 4°53′02″E
- Year built: 24 May 1879 – 2 May 1880
- Opened: 30 March 1968

Other information
- Seating capacity: 1,500 (main hall); 250 (upper floor stage)

Website
- www.paradiso.nl

Paradiso is a music venue and cultural centre located in Amsterdam, Netherlands. Built in 1880 as a religious building for the Vrije Gemeente (Free Congregation), it was converted into a youth entertainment venue in 1968. Until the 1990s, it was the largest concert club in Amsterdam. It is sometimes described as a "Pop Temple" (poptempel in Dutch), as the interior of its main hall retains some church-like features, including large stained glass windows behind the stage.

The main hall of Paradiso has a capacity of 1,500 visitors. On an upper floor, there is another small hall with a capacity of 250 people. Performances are also regularly held in the basement cafe. In 2014, the Paradiso organization began operations at a venue in Amsterdam-Noord named Tolhuistuin, formerly Paradiso Noord.

Among the most famous acts to have played Paradiso are Adele, David Bowie, U2, Eminem, Kanye West, Nirvana, Duran Duran, Pink Floyd, Lady Gaga, Prince, Los Lobos, The Rolling Stones, Metallica and Black Sabbath.

== History ==
The building which currently houses Paradiso was built from 24 May 1879 to 2 May 1880 by De Vrije Gemeente (English: The Free Congregation), a modern theologic religious group. The construction site was located next to a prison and a court. It served as a religious building and a meeting centre for the faith. In 1965, De Vrije Gemeente moved to the Buitenveldert neighbourhood and sold the building, which was originally to be repurposed into a hotel built by famous Dutch architect Gerrit Rietveld. This did not come to be and it was briefly used as a carpet store. In October 1967, the building was squatted by hippie music fans, led by Willem de Ridder, Koos Zwart, Matthijs van Heijningen and Peter Bronkhorst, who wanted to turn it into a cultural venue.

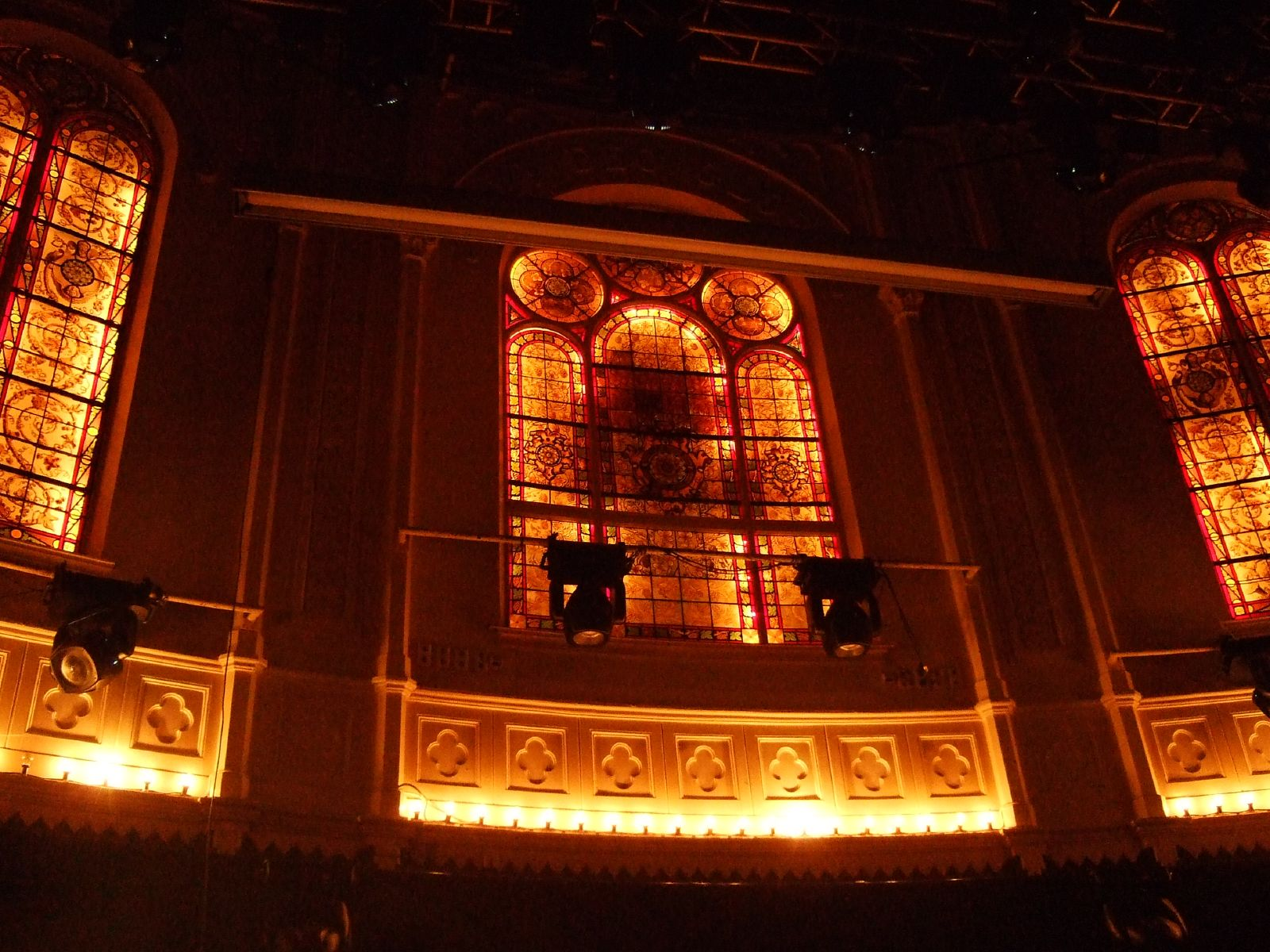
The windows of the Paradiso

After attempted police crackdowns, city officials granted the group permission to convert the space into a club. On 30 March 1968, it officially opened as Cosmisch Ontspanningscentrum Paradiso (English: "Cosmic Relaxation Center Paradiso"). Roughly 1300 people attended the first show, which consisted of a Dutch folk rock band CCC Inc., a steel band from Suriname and a dance event for women. The venue's sound originally suffered from echoing problems caused by the original design of the building, but renovations over the years have seen the sound much improved. Less than two months after its opening, the English rock band Pink Floyd played the venue on 23 May 1968, not long after announcing the departure of Syd Barrett. The 1970s were a grittier era for Amsterdam and Paradiso; a Rolling Stone report recalled how "dope, music and atmosphere were cheap and abundant" until August 1970. Amsterdam allowed for the smoking of hashish and marijuana inside Paradiso, and in 1971, The New York Times reported that it had become a "night time mecca" for American youths traveling to Amsterdam. Drug abuse led to an aggressive atmosphere and declining attendance numbers, but the venue saw a "golden age" with the rise of punk rock. On 6 and 7 January 1977, the Sex Pistols became the first punk rock band to play Paradiso. The latter show was Glen Matlock's final with the band. During a 1979 gig, American singer Iggy Pop was beaten up on stage at Paradiso by a Hells Angels biker gang which had become venue regulars.

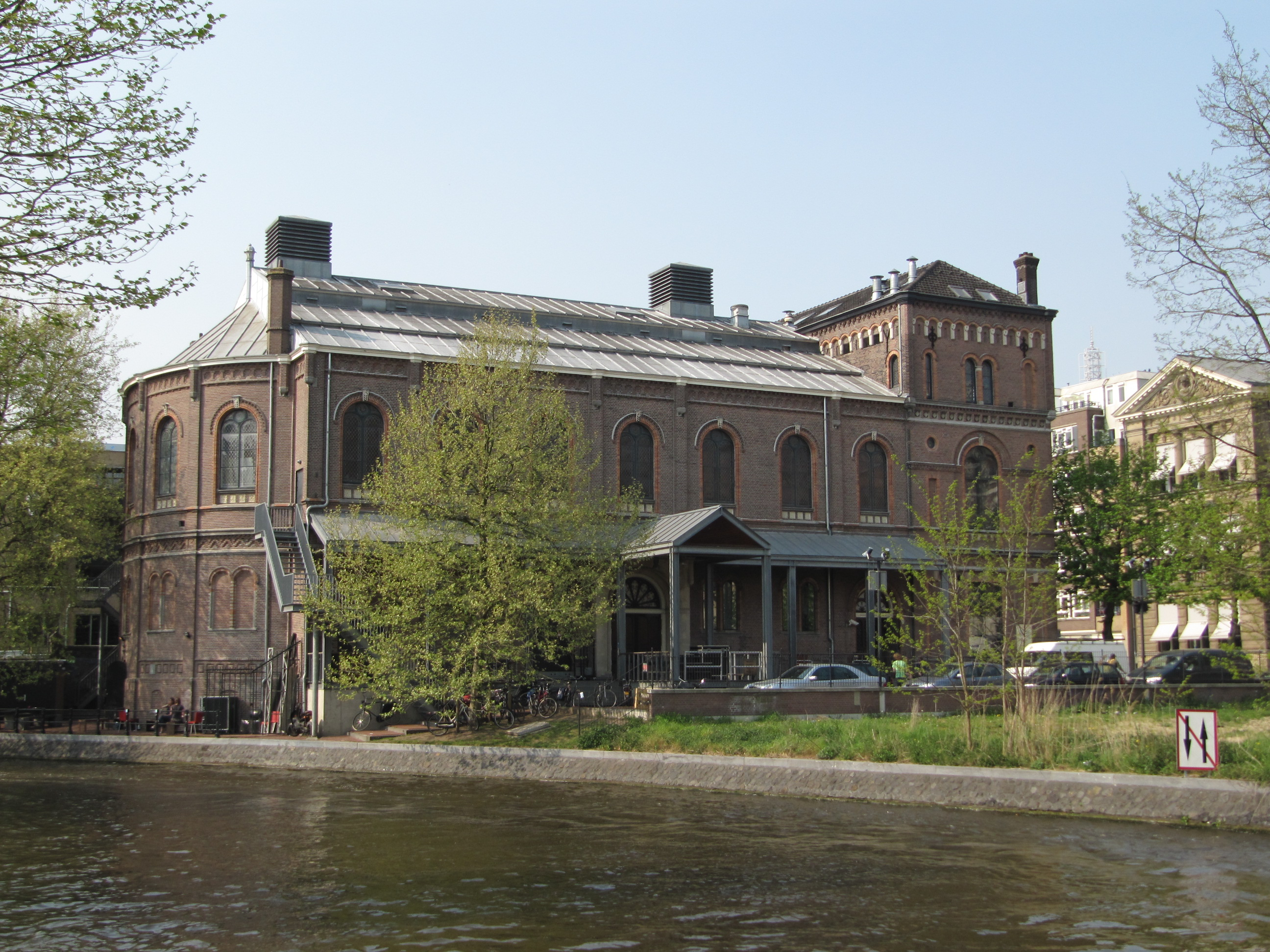
Weteringschans

In 1974, hospitality entrepreneur Nicolaas Bouwes announced plans to construct a 49,000-square meter hotel complex on the Leidseplein, requiring the demolition of Paradiso. It was met with negative reception by the Amsterdam city council, who criticised it as an unimaginative "piece of Manhattan". Bouwes' proposals never went through. On 16 September 1980, Paradiso was added to the Rijksmonumentenregister (English: National Monuments Registry), preserving it from ever facing demolition.

Until the 1990s, Paradiso was the largest concert club in Amsterdam. Then, in 1995, nearby Melkweg opened a new hall, "the Max", which eventually expanded to 1,500 capacity in 2007. In 2001, the Heineken Music Hall opened, and then in 2013, the Ziggo Dome, which replaced Rotterdam Ahoy as the arena venue for which large bands would play in the Netherlands. The 2014 opening of TivoliVredenburg in Utrecht also added more competition. In 2000, Paradiso became one of the first venues to stream free, live and on-demand concerts through Fabchannel.com, an Amsterdam-based company which ultimately shut down in 2009.

From 2003–04, Paradiso underwent renovations which added a second balcony floor, increasing capacity to 1,500. This was inspired by the Rolling Stones' 1995 concerts at Paradiso, which required a second makeshift balcony for the recording equipment. After 2008, smoking was banned in most areas of Paradiso, including the main hall, in accordance with national law. In September 2014, Paradiso opened a concert hall in Tolhuistuin, a cultural centre in Amsterdam-Noord, which was known for a few years as Paradiso Noord. In addition to Tolhuistuin, the Paradiso organization currently sponsors events in several smaller venues in Amsterdam and Amsterdam Noord.

In 2022, Paradiso bought a dilapidated plot of land adjacent to the venue for €3.5 million, with plans to build a €30 million five-storey extension to the venue consisting of an exhibition space, new offices and services for artists in residence. In 2023, Paradiso reported a record number 727,000 attendees.

In July 2025, protestors threatened to riot at Paradiso for hosting the duo Bob Vylan after they led a controversial "death to the IDF" chant at Glastonbury.

== Notable shows ==
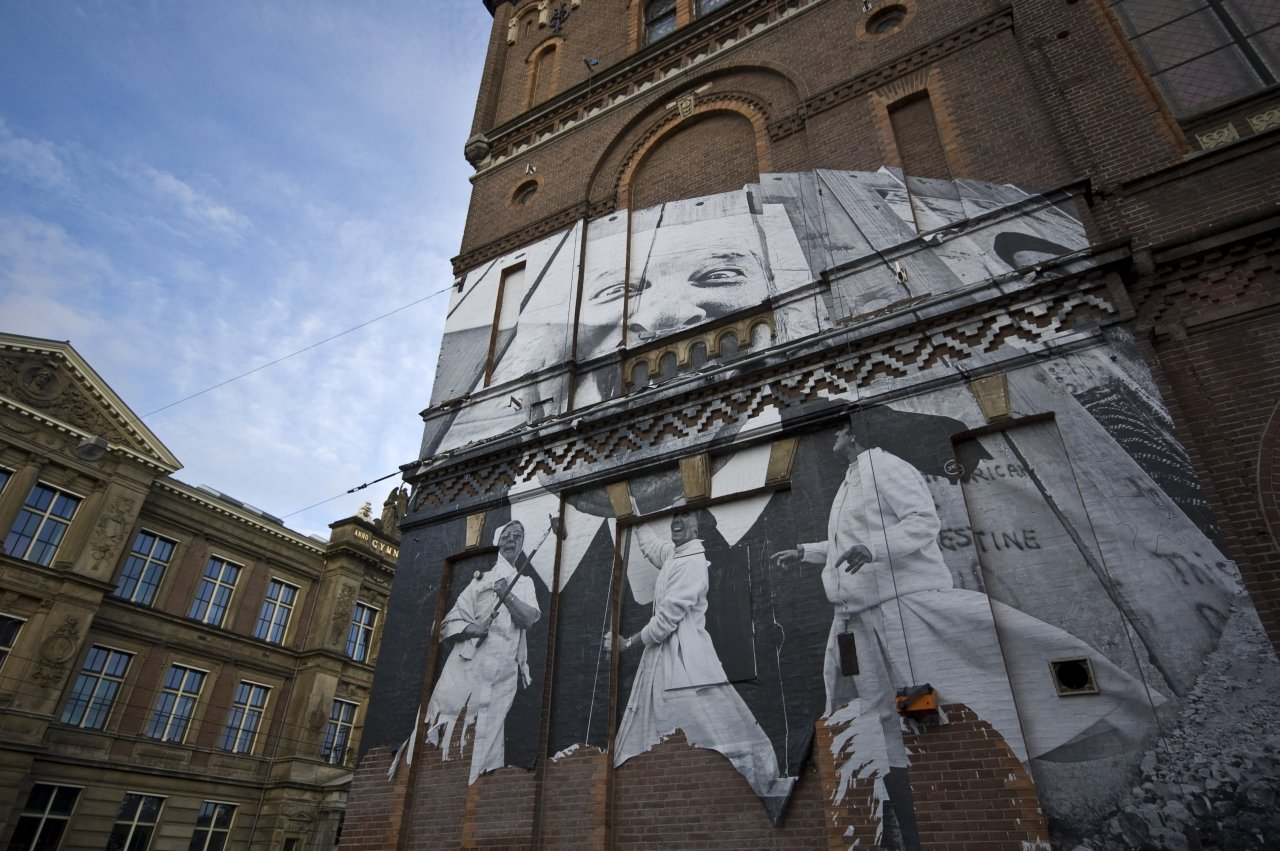
Poster on the side of Paradiso

The Rolling Stones performed two acoustic shows at Paradiso on 26 and 27 May 1995 during the Voodoo Lounge Tour. The venue had to be renovated for the shows, including the addition of a second makeshift balcony to create room for the recording equipment. The location of the concert was a secret until two weeks prior. Meters away from the venue, those who could not get in watched the concert from a live stream on a giant screen at the Museumplein, with a total crowd reported from 50,000 to 80,000 people. Recorded tracks from these concerts were released on the Stones' Stripped album later that year. Keith Richards said that the Paradiso concerts were the best live shows the Stones ever did.

Prince performed two after shows at Paradiso in March 1995. Following his stadium performance at the Brabanthallen, he played later that night at Paradiso, where he had previously taken the stage in 1981. During his Paradiso show, he unexpectedly announced that he would also be returning the next night as well, which Paradiso administrators were unaware of until the morning after. The Dutch radio program 3voor12 ranked Prince's shows at number one for Paradiso's most legendary shows in its first 50 years.

Black Sabbath played Paradiso on 25 September 1970 during the Paranoid Tour, shortly after the UK release of Paranoid. Metallica later performed at Paradiso's Grote Zaal on 7 December 1984 during the Ride the Lightning tour, with Tank as the supporting act.

== Live albums ==
Multiple bands have released live albums that were recorded at Paradiso. These include The Soft Machine's Live at the Paradiso, 1969, Bad Brains' The Youth Are Getting Restless, Link Wray's Live at the Paradiso, Phish's Amsterdam, Beth Hart's Live at Paradiso, Van der Graaf Generator's Live at the Paradiso, Live's Live at the Paradiso – Amsterdam, Cardiacs' Cardiacs Live and Epica's Live at Paradiso.

Nirvana's live album From the Muddy Banks of the Wishkah featured performances of "School", "Been a Son", "Lithium" and "Blew" taken from the band's 25 November 1991 show at Paradiso, which was originally supposed to be held at the nearby Melkweg before ticket demand necessitated a venue size upgrade. The first disc of Swans' 1998 live album Swans Are Dead contains several songs recorded live at Paradiso by Dutch public broadcaster VPRO, during the band's farewell tour in 1997. Several songs from David Bowie's formerly subscription-only live album LiveAndWell.com were recorded during his 1997 performance at Paradiso. A live version of Pink Floyd's "Interstellar Overdrive", found on their compilation album Cre/ation: The Early Years 1967–1972, was taken from their 9 August 1969 performance at Paradiso.

The song "Paradiso" by The Chameleons, released in 1986, was named after the venue.

== Gallery ==
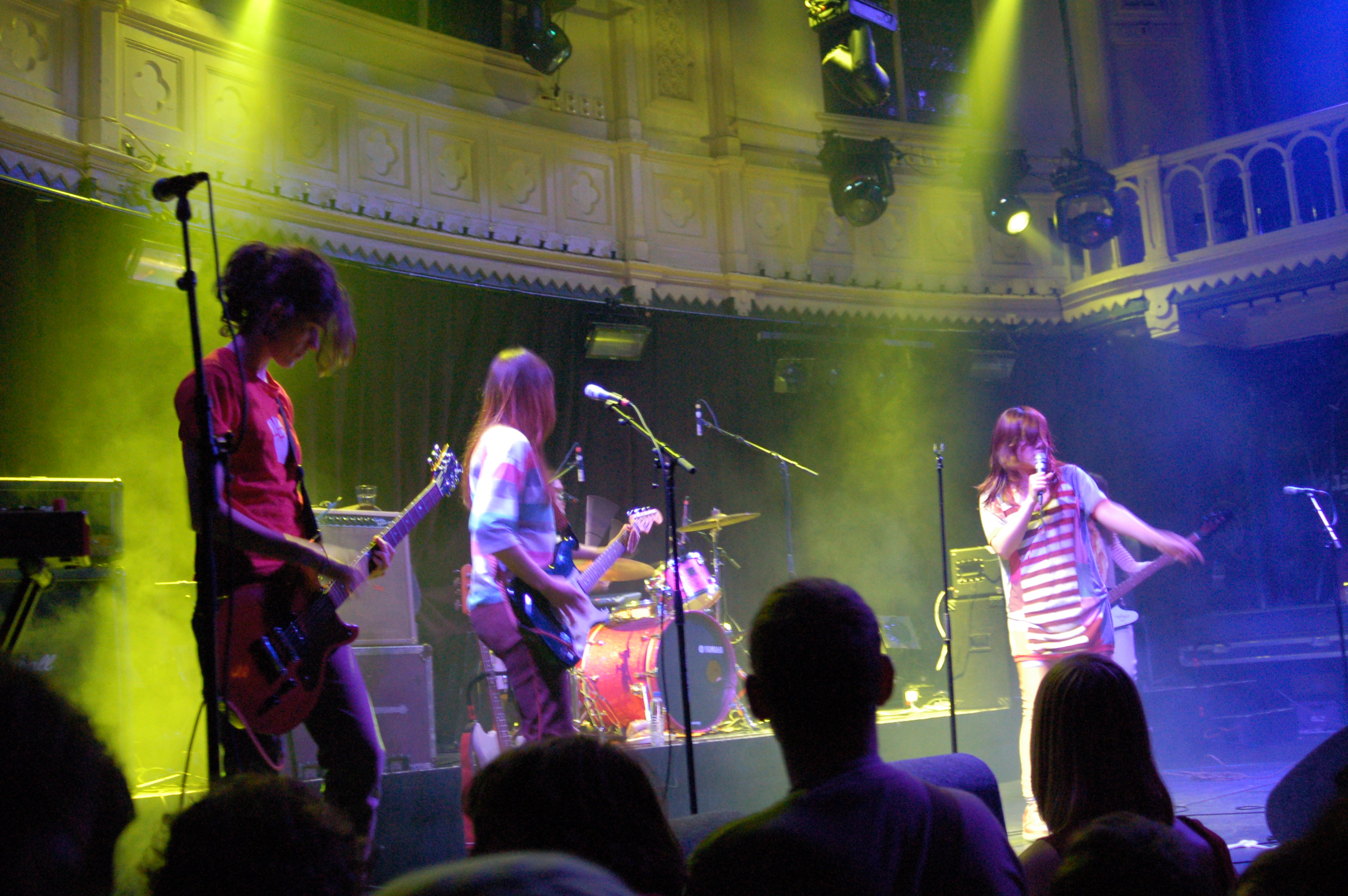
Cansei de Ser Sexy performing in the main hall

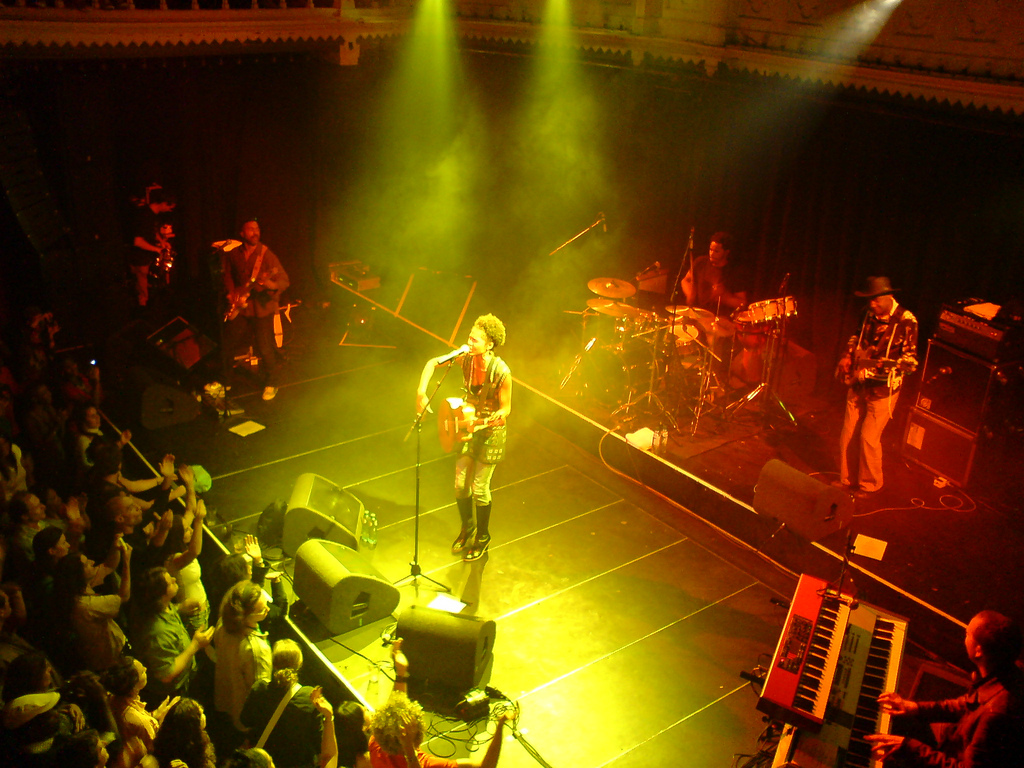
Ayọ concert on September 13, 2007

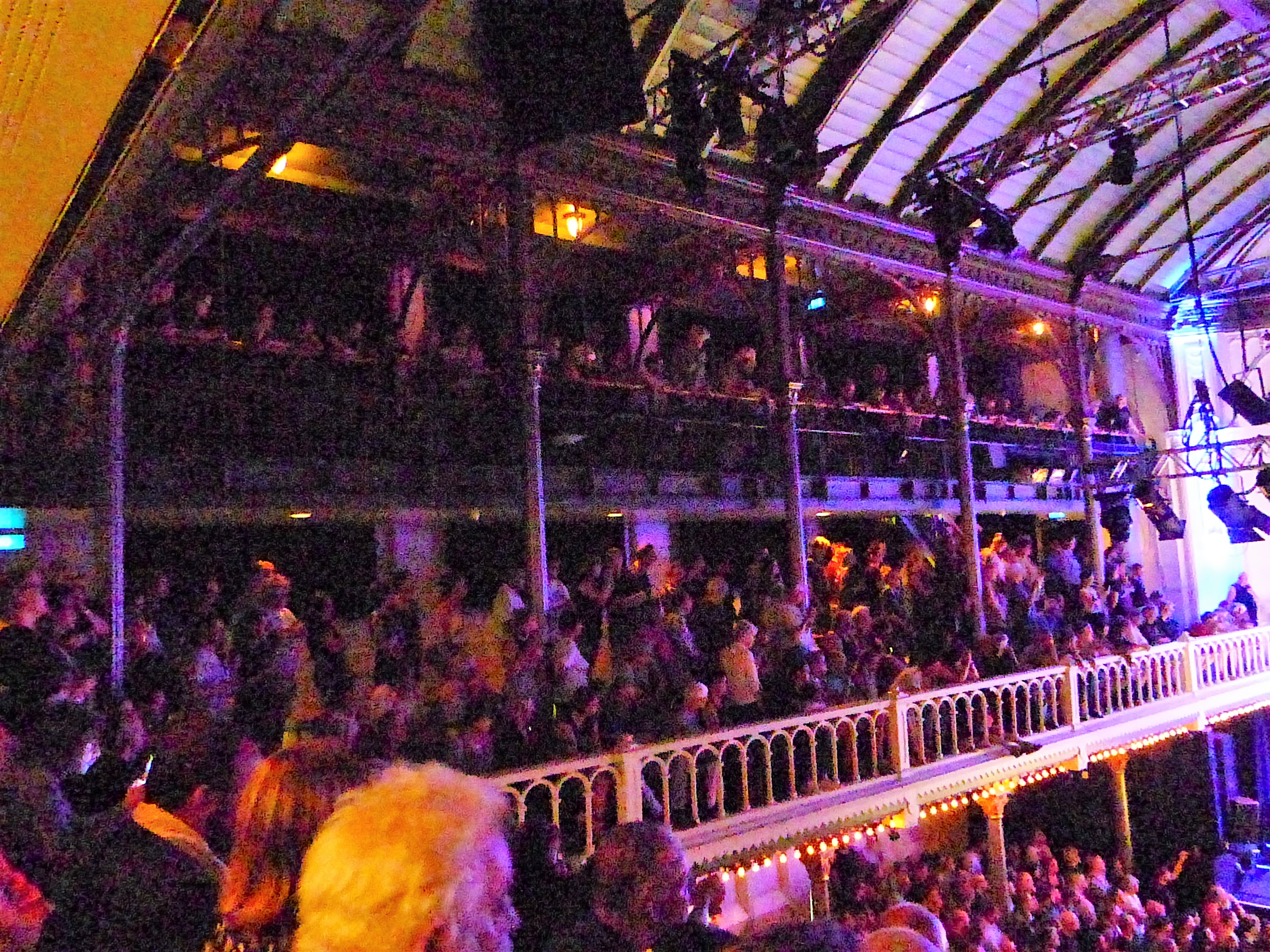
Standing ovation for Patti Smith
