= Rock music in the Netherlands =

Dutch rock is a form of rock music produced in the Netherlands, primarily in the English language as well as in Dutch.

== History ==
=== Mainstream ===
Pioneers of Dutch rock were the so-called Indorock bands from the late 1950s, like The Tielman Brothers and the Blue Diamonds. They played rock guitar instrumental music at a time when white Dutch musicians did not perform rock 'n' roll. They stemmed from the Indo community in The Hague, which was also the center of the succeeding genre in the mid-1960s, Nederbeat, when Dutch musicians formed bands influenced by British beat groups and rock music. It earned the city the title of Beatstad ('Beat city') in later years. With 1960s bands like Golden Earring and Shocking Blue, Vandenberg in the 1980s, and Kane, Di-Rect and Anouk in the 1990s, 2000s The Hague became synonymous for mainstream rock.

More progressive music emerged in the 1960s in Amsterdam. In 1964 (see 1964 in music), The Outsiders were the first Dutch psychedelic rock band to become successful. Well known was the 'Haagse Scene' - many of the popular bands of the 1960s came from The Hague, such as Shocking Blue, which topped the US charts in 1970 with Venus, Golden Earring, Q65, The Motions and Earth & Fire ("Seasons", 1970). Shocking Blue released "Never Marry a Railroad Man" (1970) and "Inkpot"(1972). Other representatives from this period include the Cats, Tee Set, Bintangs, Sandy Coast, Cuby & the Blizzards and Brainbox. George Baker Selection acquired international fame with the songs "Little Green Bag" (1969), and "Una Paloma Blanca" (1975).

From the late 1960s the post war generation gained political influence. Many state subsidised rock venues opened all over the country. These clubs, like Amsterdam's Paradiso and Melkweg, were stepping stones for many alternative rock bands on their first European tour and the Dutch crowd stayed well informed about new British and American acts.

In the 1970s some artists stood out. Mouth and MacNeal had a hit "How Do You Do" (1972) in the US chart. Herman Brood became the ultimate Rock 'n Roll icon. He even scored a hit in the US with "Saturday Night". He became the epitome of the "rock'n'roll junkie" he sang about. As an artist he was in the media until his suicide in 2001. Other bands from the 1970s include Supersister, Gruppo Sportivo, Massada, Vitesse, Solution, the Nits, Kayak, Focus (who had a hit, "Hocus Pocus" in 1973) and Golden Earring with their biggest hit, "Radar Love" (1974), which hit the Top 10 in the US.

The late 1970s and early 1980s gave many one hit wonders and some bands that lasted longer. Female bands Luv' and Dolly Dots but also disco bands Spargo and Time Bandits were the most successful. Together with Golden Earring, which scored some of their biggest hits with "Twilight Zone" (1983) and "When the Lady Smiles" (1984). The Nits developed a large audience outside the Netherlands, including in Finland, Switzerland, Germany, France, Belgium, Greece and Canada and in 1989 were the first Dutch band to play in the (then still) Soviet Union. Urban Dance Squad was a cross-over band, combining hip-hop with funk and rock. The band's minor American success proved to be influential. Their music style (rapcore) influenced bands like Rage Against the Machine. Van Halen was created by Edward Van Halen who is of Dutch heritage.

Dutch bands in the 2000s are Intwine, Kane, The Sheer, Krezip, Di-rect, Heidevolk and Johan.

Current rock acts include Anouk, Voicst, Di-Rect, Kane, Destine, De Staat, Navarone, John Coffey.

=== Metal ===
The Netherlands are also known for symphonic metal bands such as Within Temptation, The Gathering, After Forever, Delain and Epica. They became successful in the late 1990s and in the beginning of the new millennium.

Similarly, in the last decade of the previous century a more extreme variety of metal, death metal, have had some success. Bands like Gorefest, Pestilence, Asphyx and Sinister were well-known both in and outside Europe. At the present, bands like Legion of the Damned, Pyaemia, Maaswater Veenlijk and Severe Torture enjoy a similar status.

In the 1980s Vandenberg was internationally successful.

=== Punk ===
As a result of U.K. and U.S. bands touring the Netherlands, punk exploded as a cultural phenomenon in 1977. The credit for being the first Dutch punk band is given sometimes to Ivy Green (formed in Hazerswoude-Dorp in 1975), to the Flyin’ Spiderz (formed in Eindhoven in 1976), or to Blitzkrieg (formed in Utrecht in 1976, and who quickly changed their name to The Duds). These bands had already formed at the point that punk "reached" the Netherlands, but they all quickly began performing and producing records in the punk style.

Dutch punk evolved with a combination of U.K., U.S., European, and global punk influences. The early Dutch punk bands wrote songs with English lyrics. Although today some bands use lyrics in Dutch, many Dutch punk bands continue to write English lyrics and tour internationally. The Netherlands has a lively punk scene that includes many different styles including hardcore, ultra, crust punk, pop punk, fun punk, skate punk, emocore, and melodic hardcore. Some popular Dutch punk bands that have toured internationally include Antidote, Minny Pops, Bambix, Backfire!, and De Heideroosjes.

=== Boerenrock ===
Some bands create a kind of rock music sometimes called "Boerenrock" ('farmers rock'). These bands mix rock and pop music with regional influences, sometimes sung in the regional dialect, and lyrics influenced by life in rural areas. Examples include BZB (Band Zonder Banaan) and WC Experience from North Brabant, Normaal and Jovink en de Voederbietels from Gelderland, Rowwen Hèze and Neet Oét Lottum from Limburg, Mooi Wark from Drenthe and Jitiizer from Friesland.

Musically, the music played by such bands can be described as a rowdy, straightforward style of rock music, inspired by bands such as ZZ Top, Motörhead, AC/DC and CCR. At other times, influences from pop music and folk music (for instance the case with Rowwen Hèze) can be heard.

Not rarely, these bands display a lot of humorous elements in their repertoire, lyrics and live performances. An example is the repertoire of the WC Experience, which contains cover songs from bands such as Queen, Guns N' Roses and Madness, only the lyrics are replaced by different, rather silly lyrics in their own dialect. Also, the name of 'Band Zonder Banaan' means "Band without a Banana", and is a humorous play on the name of a famous Dutch pop-band, BZN (Band Zonder Naam, or 'Band Without a Name'). The name "Jovink en de Voederbietels" is a contraction of the names of the two founding band members (Hendrik Jan Lovink en Gijs Jolink), and "voederbietel" is a Dutch word for a food trough on a farm.

Boerenrock bands tend to perform at local festivities and concerts in big tents in rural areas, rather than in concert halls in bigger cities. An event where a lot of Boerenrock music can be heard, and a famous event amongst Boerenrock bands and fans, is the yearly Zwarte Cross ('Black Motocross') which is organized by members of 'Jovink en de Voederbietels'. The event is a mixture of several motocross related activities and a rock festival.

=== Indie rock ===
The indie music scene in the Netherlands is mainly active in the four biggest cities Amsterdam, The Hague, Rotterdam and Utrecht as well as the northern cities Groningen and Leeuwarden. Following below a brief overview of bands, organisations, venues, festivals that create and are connected to the Dutch scene.

In the 1990s indie rock band Bettie Serveert was formed and independent record label Excelsior Recordings released albums of Dutch indie rock bands like Caesar, Ghost Trucker, Alamo Race Track, Johan, Spinvis, Gem, Bauer, Daryll-Ann, zZz, Cloudmachine and many others. After 2000 Voicst was formed and became popular after a beer commercial hit single for Heineken. After leaving Zoppo and forming Avec-A musician Yuri Landman received international attention as an experimental luthier for famous experimental rock bands. Dutch noise rock acts are The Ex, Gone Bald, The Moi Non Plus, Adept, Bonne Aparte, Feverdream. Post rock: We vs Death, Electropunk: Aux Raus.

==== Indie rock scene by city ====
- Amsterdam: Bands like Claw Boys Claw, The Ex, Bettie Serveert, Gone Bald, Caesar, Ghost Trucker, Zoppo, Voicst, zZz, experimental instrument builder Yuri Landman. A cross media platform called Subbacultcha! hosts nights in venues where many international touring avant garde rockbands like Health, Enon, Miracle Fortress, Mahjongg, These Are Powers, Pre perform as well as local indie and noise rock acts like The Moi Non Plus, Bonne Aparte, Adept, Hospital Bombers, Pfaff. Subbacultcha! also publishes a musical magazine with interviews with the touring bands. It also promotes Dutch bands at foreign festivals such as SxSW and Popkomm in Berlin Venues that regularly showcase indie rock acts (local and touring bands): Paradiso, Melkweg, OCCII, De Nieuwe Anita, OT301, Bitterzoet, Studio K.
- Eindhoven: Music venue the Effenaar, bands: Stuurbaard Bakkebaard, Beukorkest, Peter Pan Speedrock
- Groningen: Music venues in Groningen are Vera, Groningen and Simplon, Groningen. Label Subroutine Records. Yearly a prominent indie rock showcase festival called Eurosonic takes place in Groningen. Venue Vera has a long tradition as a prominent underground spot and desired place for touring indie bands to play. Bands: Vox Von Braun
- Haarlem: Bands: the Sheer, Cloudmachine, venue: The Patronaat has two stages and a bar that occasionally also hosts live music.
- The Hague: A yearly festival State-X New Forms happens in Paard van Troje. Bands Fine Chine Superbone, Jobkiss.
- Leeuwarden: Suicidal Birds, Adept, Bonne Aparte and Academy for Pop Culture. Venues: Romeijn and Asteriks
- Nijmegen: The Legendary Pink Dots is an experimental rock band with a long tradition and connection with Nijmegen since they are based there since the mid 1980s. Valkhof Festival (formerly known as Festival de Affaire) is a yearly festival featuring a line-up filled with international and national indie rock acts. Venues in Nijmegen are Doornroosje, Merleyn, De Onderbroek, and Extrapool.
- Rotterdam: Bands like Feverdream, Oil, Elle Bandita, Eklin, Rats on Rafts, Death Letters, Neon Rainbows, Bismuth. Since 1990 the Metropolis Pop Festival takes place yearly in July. In the years 2005-2011 the city struggled with venues for pop music. Many of the venues suffered severe financial problems. This resulted in the disappearance of the major music venues Nighttown and WATT and smaller stages such as Waterfront, Exit, and Heidegger. Currently the city has a few venues for pop music like Rotown, Poortgebouw. The venue WORM and Roodkapje both focus on experimental music and related cutting edge subcultural music.
- Utrecht: Bands and artists like Eefje de Visser, Gem, Spinvis, We vs Death, John Coffey, Mister and Mississippi, NORDEN, The Brahms, Falco Benz, Aafke Romeijn, Eins, Zwei Orchestra, and independent record label Beep! Beep! Back Up the Truck. Venues: Tivoli, Tivoli De Helling, EKKO, ACU, Kargadoor, DBs. A yearly November festival called Le Guess Who? takes place in Utrecht.

== See also ==
- The Dutch Rock & Pop Institute funded by Ministry of Education, Culture and Science (Netherlands)
- Music of the Netherlands
- Music venues in the Netherlands
