= Music venues in the Netherlands =

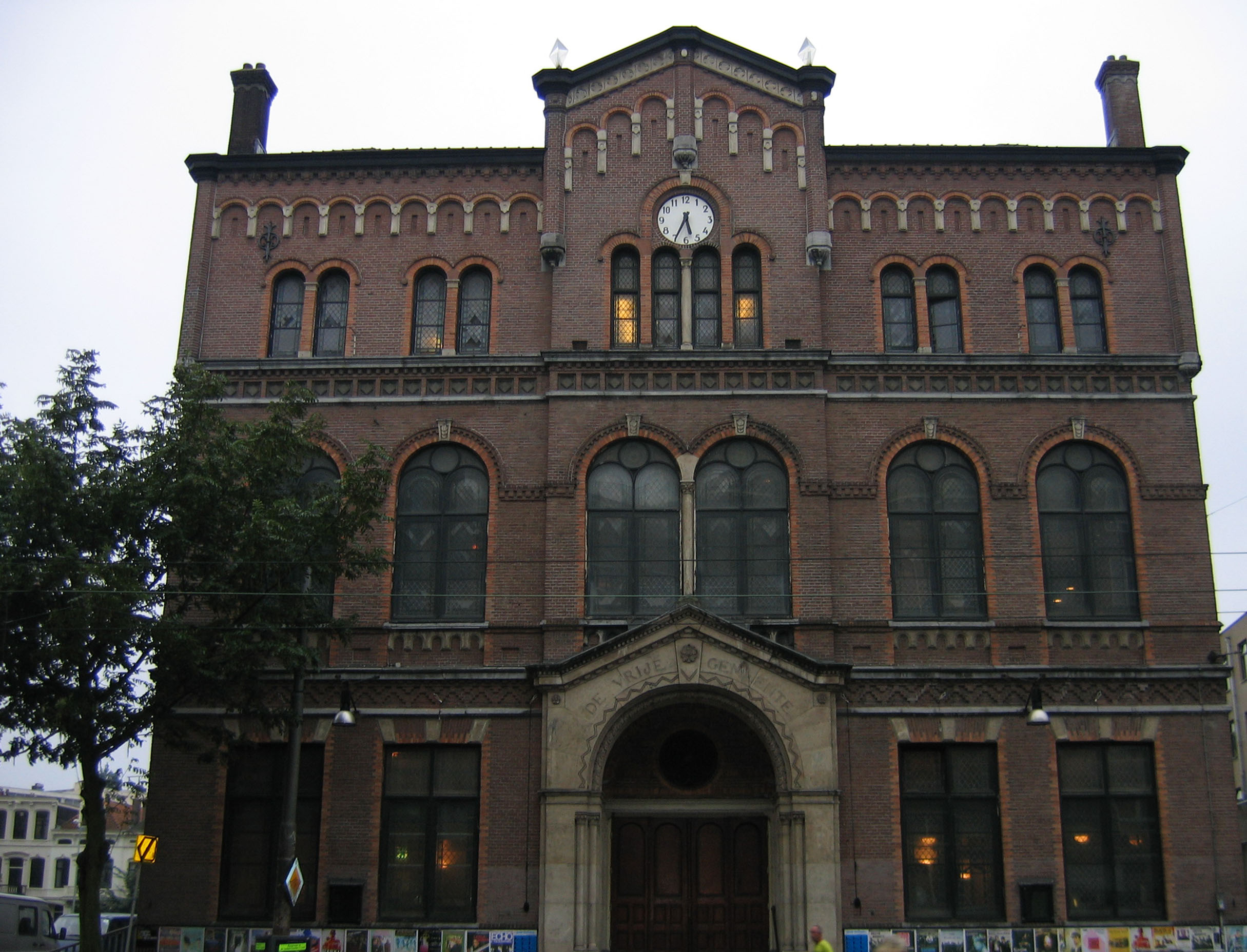
Paradiso in Amsterdam

Music venues in the Netherlands are a vivid part of the social cultural environment of the country.

The ten biggest dedicated music venues are Ziggo Dome, AFAS Live, Melkweg, Paradiso in Amsterdam, de Aula Meander college in Zwolle, Paard van Troje in The Hague, Tivoli (TivoliVredenburg & Tivoli De Helling) in Utrecht, Patronaat in Haarlem, 013 in Tilburg, Effenaar in Eindhoven and Doornroosje in Nijmegen. Watt in Rotterdam has shut his doors in 2010.

In every middle sized town of city (approx. 100.000 inhabitants) there's a music venue for popular music genres. In the Netherlands about fifty of these music venues receive funding from the government following the advice of Muziek Centrum Nederland. Other venues are independent or subsidiarised by the cities themselves or are local social centres, community centres and cultural centres with a stage facilitating music performances.

Furthermore, there are a number of multifunctional venues (like Ahoy in Rotterdam, Westergasfabriek in Amsterdam, Doelen in Rotterdam or Oosterpoort in Groningen) which frequently host musical acts. Furthermore, a number of sportstadiums feature on the megaconcert circuit, foremost Amsterdam Arena, De Kuip in Rotterdam and Gelredome in Arnhem.

== List of music venues ==
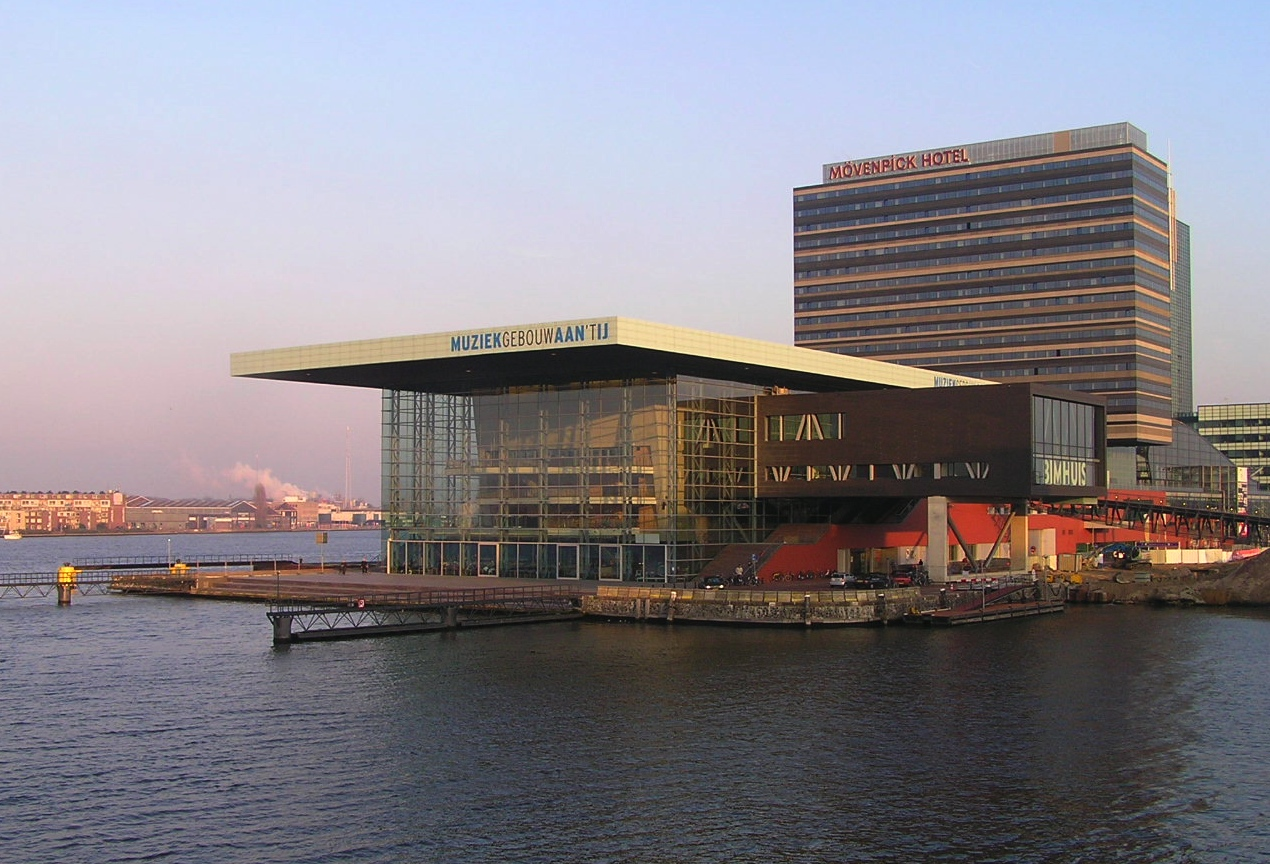
The Muziekgebouw aan 't IJ and the Bimhuis

Arranged in alphabetical order per city

- Alkmaar
  - Popular music: Victorie
- Amstelveen
  - Popular music: P60
- Amsterdam

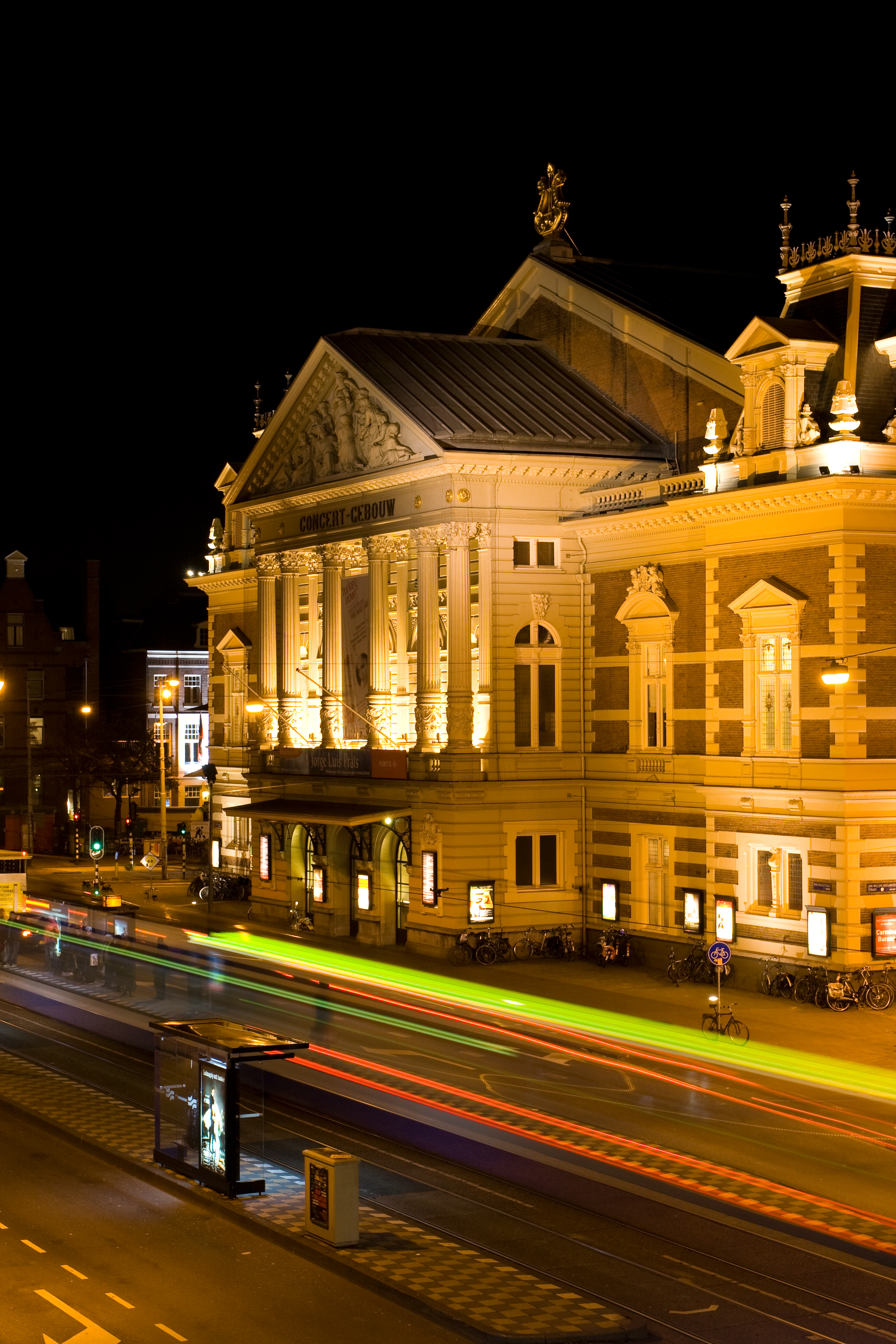
Concertgebouw at night in 2008

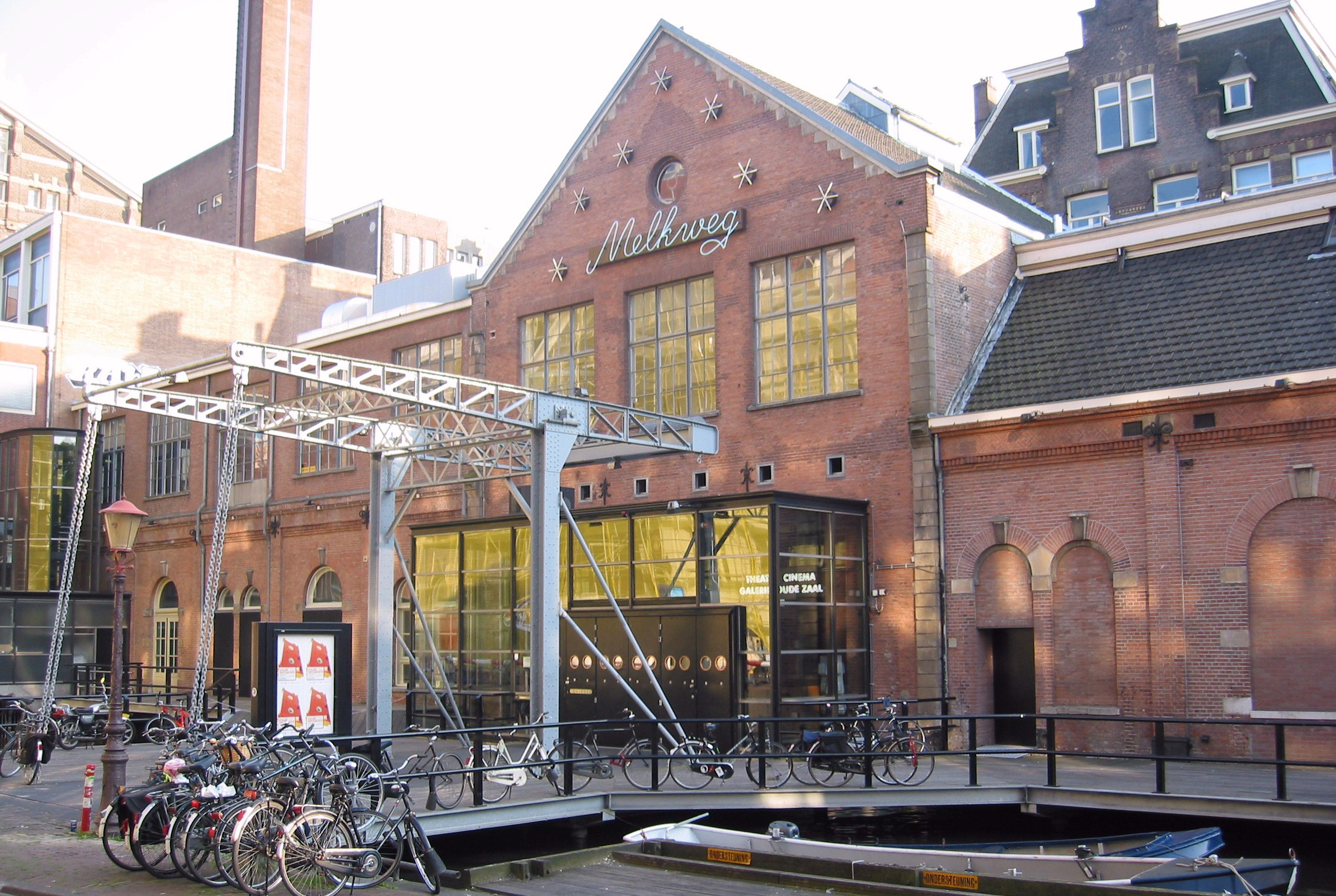
The main entrance of the Melkweg

  - Classical music & Jazz: Concertgebouw, Muziekgebouw aan 't IJ, Bimhuis
  - Jazz & Popular Music: Club Dauphine
  - Popular music: AFAS Live, Melkweg, Paradiso, OCCII, OT301, De Nieuwe Anita, Ziggo Dome
  - Electronic music: STEIM
- Apeldoorn
  - Popular music: De Gigant
- Arnhem
  - Popular music: Luxor, Willemeen, Gelredome
  - Classical music: Musis Sacrum
  - Former venues: Rijnhal
- Bergen op Zoom
  - Popular music: Gebouw-T
- Breda
  - Popular music: Mezz, Breepark
  - Musicals: Chassé Theater
- Den Bosch
  - Popular music: Willem Twee Concertzaal, Brabanthallen, Podium Azijnfabriek, Verkadefabriek
  - Classical music:Willem Twee Toonzaal
- Deventer
  - Popular music: Burgerweeshuis
- Dordrecht
  - Popular music: Bibelot
- Drachten
  - Popular music: Iduna
- Eindhoven

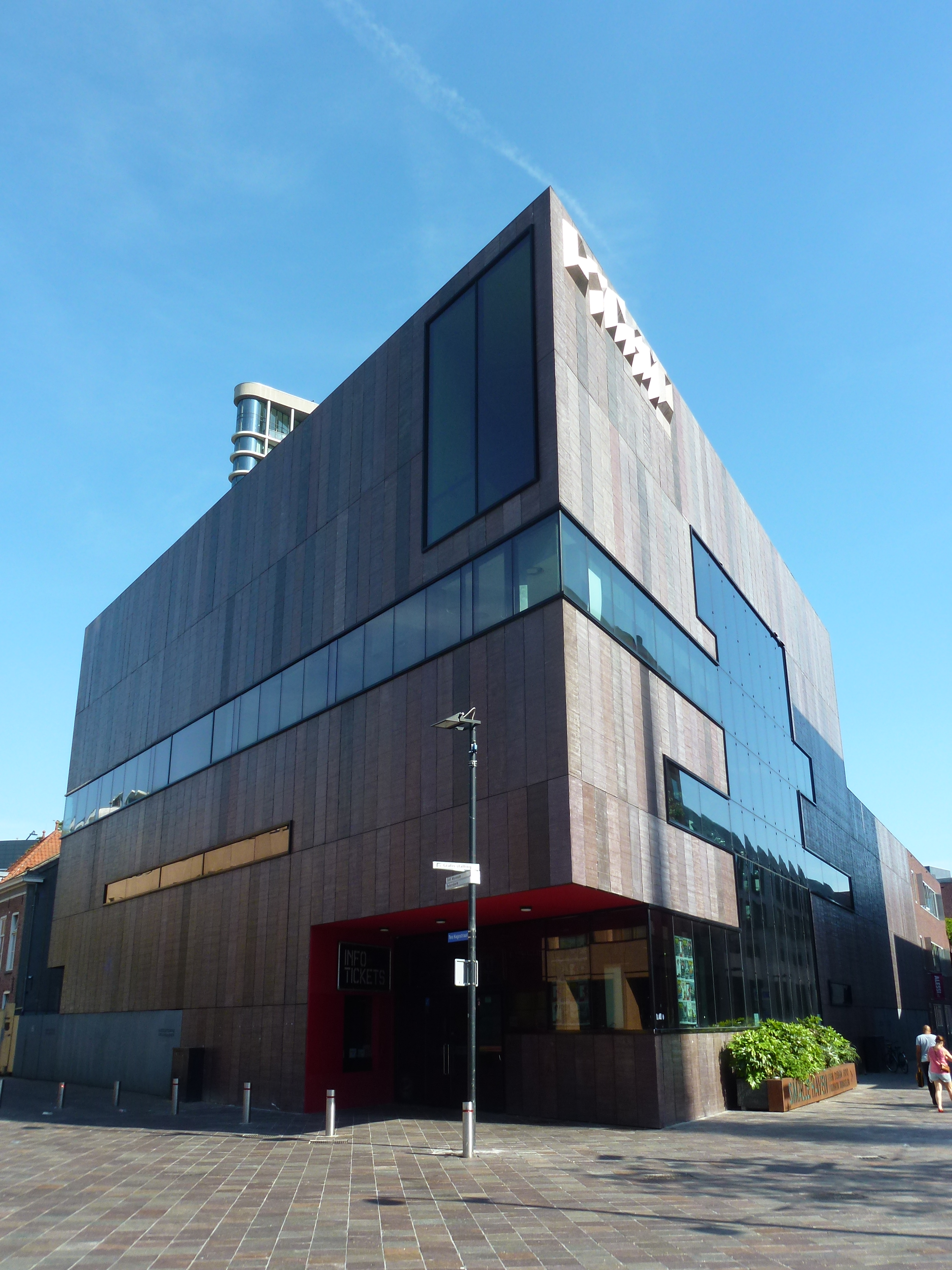
Dynamo Eindhoven

  - Populair music and upcoming talents in music: Dynamo Eindhoven

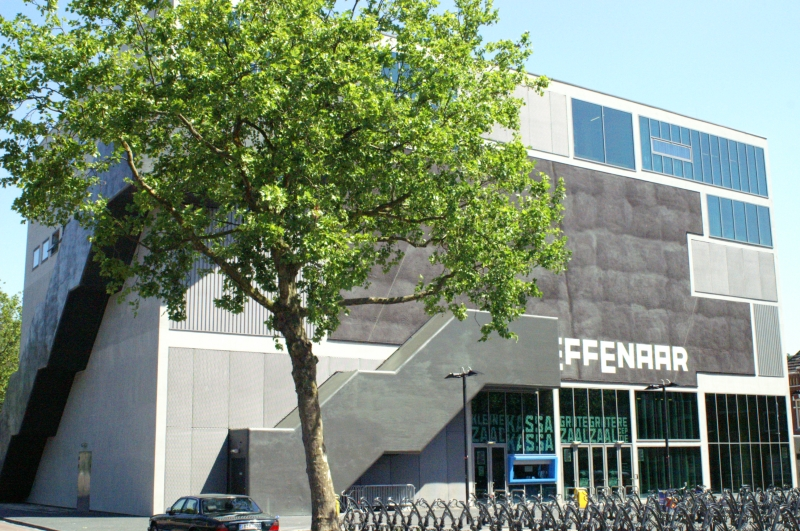
The Effenaar after the renovation in 2005

  - Popular music: Effenaar

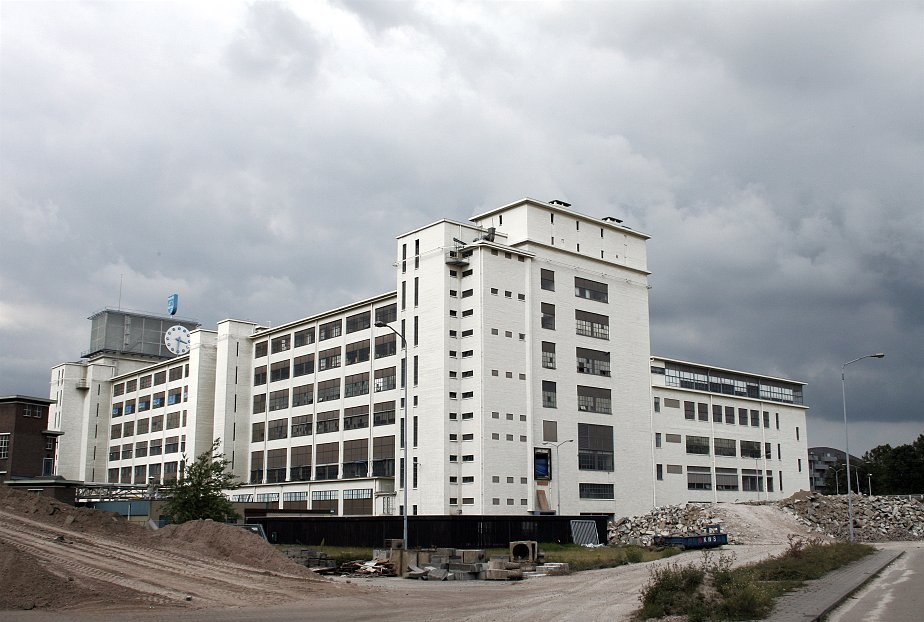
Strijp-S

  - Populair music: Klokgebouw Eindhoven op Strijp-S

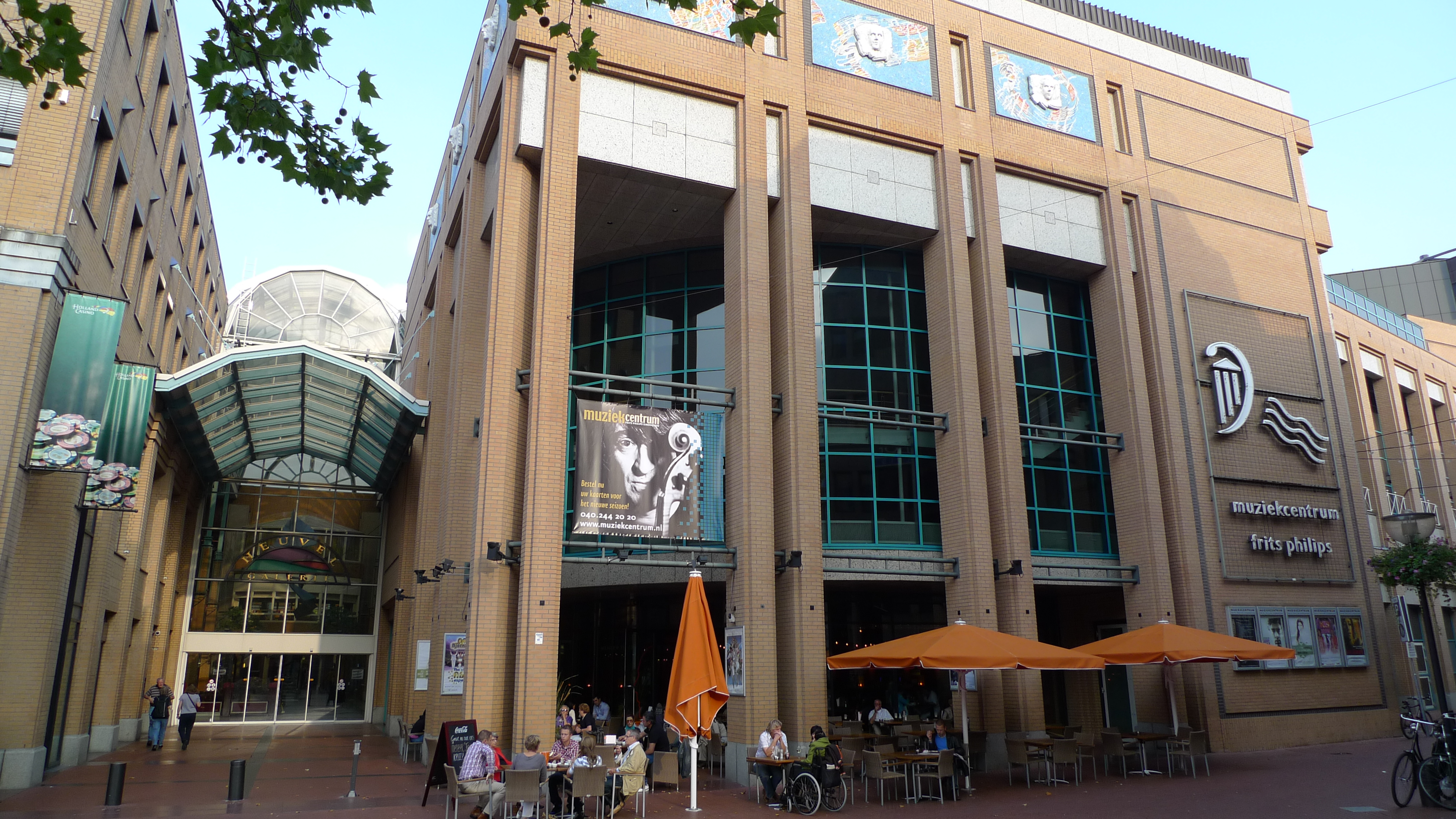
Muziekgebouw Frits Philips

  - Classical music: Muziekgebouw Frits Philips
- Emmeloord
  - Popular music: De Klos
- Enschede
  - Popular music: Atak
- Gouda
  - Popular music: So What!
- Groningen
  - Popular music: Vera, Simplon, De Oosterpoort
  - Experimental music/sound art: Galerie Sign
- Haarlem

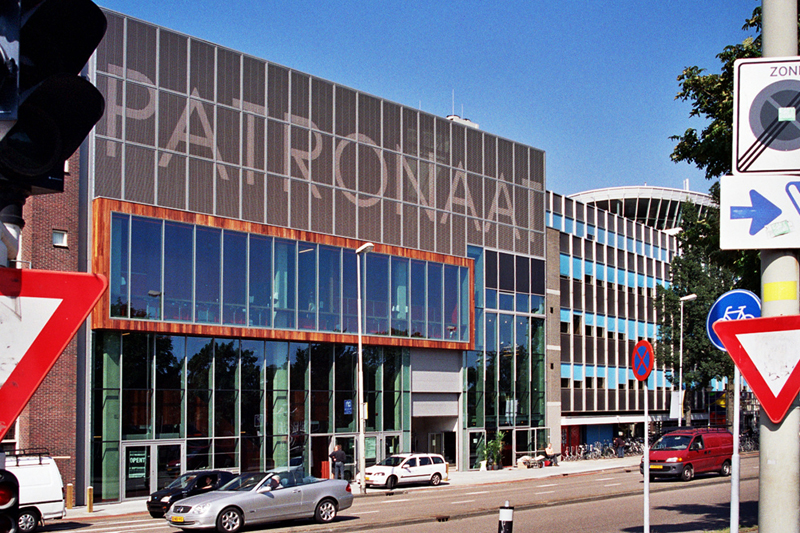
Patronaat in Haarlem

  - Popular music: Patronaat
- The Hague
  - Classical music: Dr. Anton Philipszaal
  - Popular Music: Paard van Troje, De Supermarkt
- Helmond
  - Popular music: Plato
- Hilversum
  - Popular music: De Vorstin
- Hoorn
  - Popular music: Manifesto
- Kaatsheuvel
  - Popular music: Crossroads Kaatsheuvel
  - Popular music: Gildebond
  - Popular music: Het Klavier
  - Musicals: Efteling Theatre
- Leeuwarden
  - Popular music: Podium Asteriks, Neushoorn, WTC Expo
  - Former venues: Poppodium Romein, Muziekcentrum Schaaf
- Leiden
  - Popular music: LVC
  - Upcoming talents: De Nobel
- Lierop
  - Popular music: Nirwana
- Nijmegen
  - Classical music: Concertgebouw de Vereeniging
  - Popular music: Doornroosje, Merleijn
  - Experimental music: Extrapool
- Purmerend
  - Popular music: P3
- Rotterdam

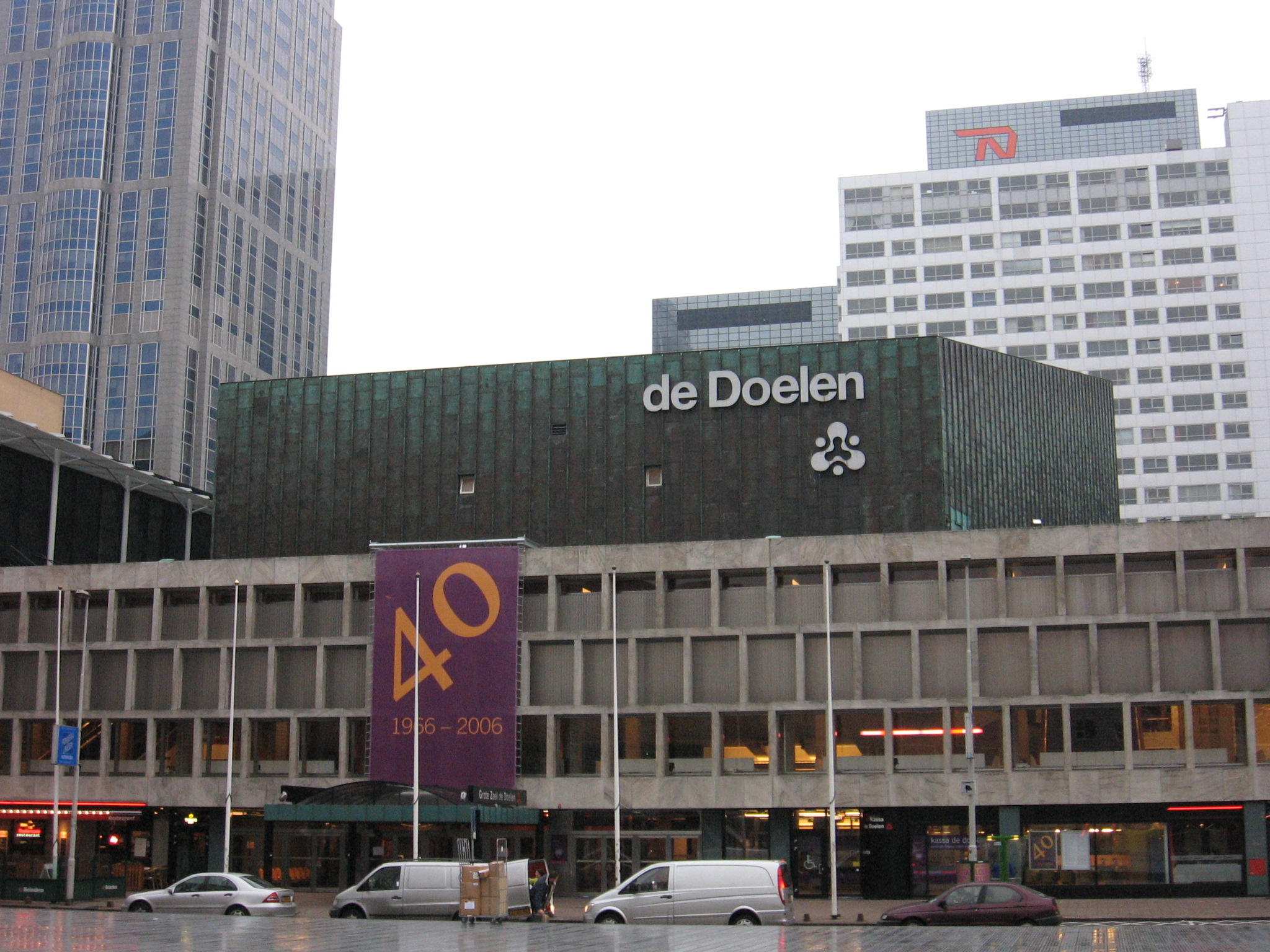
De Doelen

  - Classical music: De Doelen
  - Popular music: Ahoy, Bird, Rotown, The Player, Waterfront, Luxor Theater
  - Experimental music: WORM
  - Alternative music: Baroeg, Poortgebouw
  - Former venues: WATT, Nighttown, Blokhut
- Sittard
  - Popular music: Volt
- Sneek
  - Popular music: Het Bolwerk
- Tilburg
  - Large concert hall: 013,
  - Popular music: Theaters Tilburg, Cul de Sac
  - Jazz: Paradox Tilburg
  - Classical music: Het Cenakel
  - Alternative Music: Little Devil, Extase
  - Former venues: Noorderligt, Attak tilburg
- Uden:
  - Popular music: De Pul
- Utrecht:

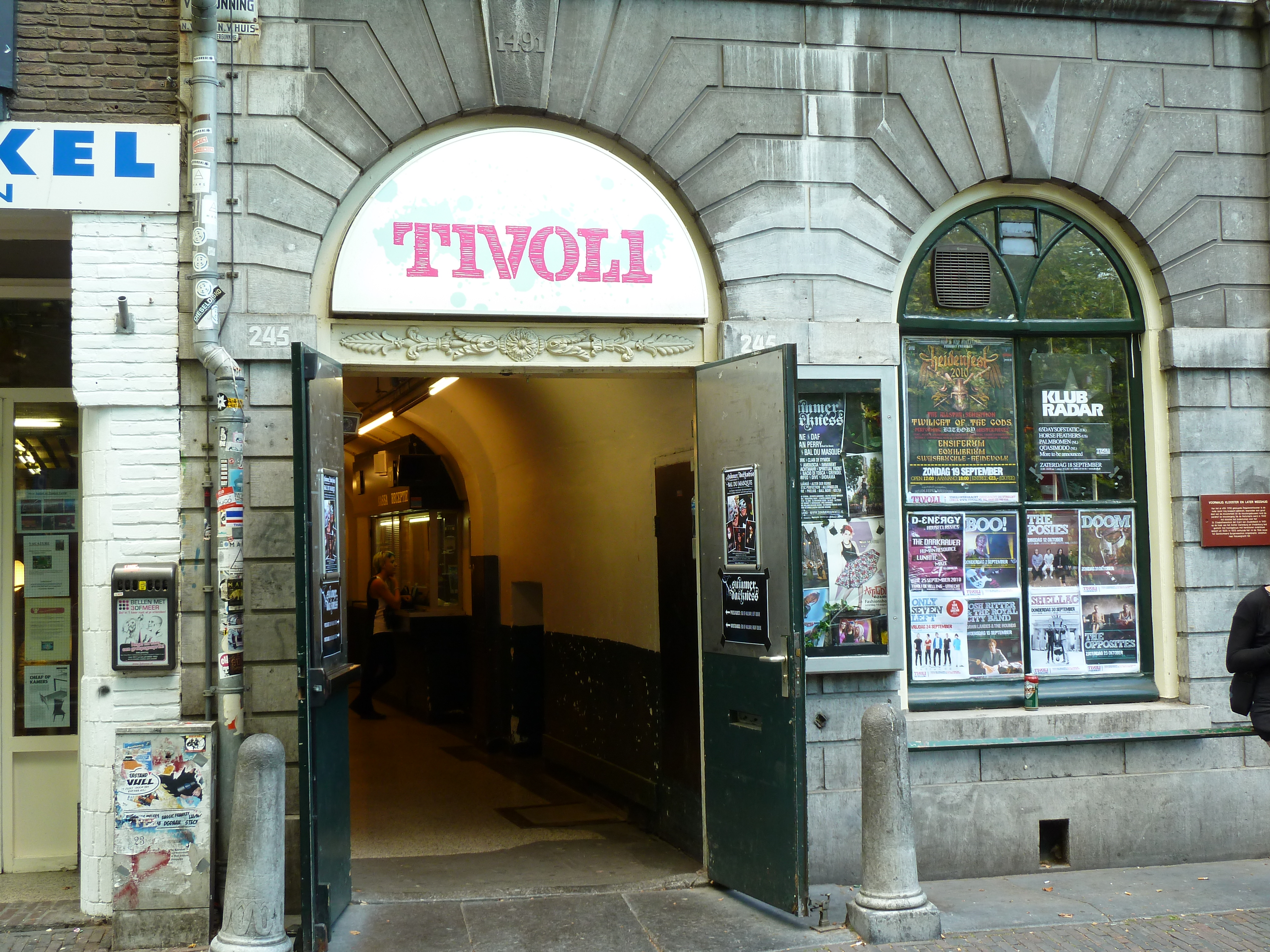
Tivoli Oudegracht

  - Large concert hall: TivoliVredenburg
  - Jazz: SJU Jazz
  - Popular music: De Helling, EKKO, ACU, DBs, De Vechtclub, Kargadoor
  - World Music: RASA
  - Former venues: Tivoli, Muziekcentrum Vredenburg
- Waalwijk
  - Popular music: De Broertjes
  - Popular music: De Leest
  - Popular music: De Mads
- Weert:
  - Popular music: De Bosuil
- Zaandam
  - Popular music: De Kade
- Zoetermeer
  - Popular music: De Boerderij
- Zwolle
  - Popular music: IJsselhallen, Hedon

== See also ==
- Dutch rock
