= The Dutch Rock & Pop Institute =

The Dutch Rock & Pop Institute (Dutch: Nationaal Pop Instituut, NPI) was a centre for the Dutch popular music culture. Established since 1975, the Dutch Rock & Pop Institute was funded by the Dutch Ministry of Culture to promote Dutch music at home and abroad. Apart from pop and rock, it also promotes hip hop, urban, dance, crossover, roots and world music. The institute also decides about subsidies for Dutch music venues. Nowadays the institute cooperates with other Dutch music centers as Music Center the Netherlands.

== International activities ==
The Dutch Rock & Pop Institute is involved in various international activities, either as originator or as a partner. In 2001 in conjunction with the Conamus Foundation it launched the campaign musicXport.nl, which stimulates the promotion of Dutch music in neighbouring Germany. Due to budget cuts by the Dutch government, the campaign has temporarily been put on hold. The Dutch Rock & Pop Institute visits conferences abroad as well, including Austin Texas's South By South West, New York's CMJ and Berlin's PopKomm.

== Media Centre ==
The Media Centre of the Dutch Rock & Pop Institute is the source of information on pop music from the Netherlands. The Multimedia Centre contains a large collection of books, magazines and sound carriers. The main focus of the Multimedia Centre is on Dutch pop music. However, the collection of books and magazines also contains all important international titles.

== FRET ==
FRET is a free publication about the pop music scene in the Netherlands. It contains interviews, reviews, a gig guide and background information about Dutch bands and artists. This Dutch-language magazine is available at record stores and venues in the Netherlands.

== Subsidized popvenues ==
The institute gave Dutch venues for live pop music the status of mainvenue. That status could result in a subsidy and extra support and standing. The capacity of the venue was leading for an A-, B- or C-status.

There are 45 venues with a status. Among the seven mainvenues with an A-status are:

- Paradiso in Amsterdam
- Melkweg in Amsterdam
- Paard van Troje in The Hague
- Tivoli in Utrecht
- 013 in Tilburg
- Effenaar in Eindhoven

== See also ==
- Music of the Netherlands
- Music venues in the Netherlands
- Rock music in the Netherlands
