= Slegers =

Slegers is a surname. Notable people with the surname include:

- Aaron Slegers (born 1992), American baseball pitcher
- Ferre Slegers (born 2004), Belgian football player
- Lieve Slegers (born 1965), Belgian former long-distance runner
- Renée Slegers (born 1989), Dutch football player and coach
- Saskia Slegers (born 1962), Dutch DJ
