= State-X =

Music festival in the Netherlands

- Genre: Different
- Dates: December
- Locations: The Hague, Netherlands
- Years active: 2004 – present
- Founders: Jan Borchers
- Website: www.state-xnewforms.nl

State-X New Forms is an independent festival for independent music culture such as avant garde music, noise rock, indie rock, IDM, held in The Hague, Netherlands since 2004. The festival is a fusion of the two festivals State-X and New Forms both of which were held for 6 years. The first edition of the sold out State-X festival was organised by The Hague Pop Centre, (HPC), and took place in the year 2001 at The Korzo Theatre in The Hague. State-X was founded by Rob Vondracek and Michiel Breedveld and New Forms was organised by Paard van Troje and founded by Henk Koolen.

== Concept ==
X-plore, X-plain & X-pect: The vision of State-X New Forms festival can be enumerated in the trinity X-plore, X-plain and X-pect. X-plore stands for new developments in experimental popular music, X-plain stands for the background and influences that led us to here and X-pect stands for the expectations in experimental popular music for the future. The programmers of State-X New Forms are focusing on avant garde developments in popular music. A short summary of artists and bands that performed on State-X New Forms in past editions: Mono (Japanese band), Sonic Youth, Pere Ubu, Tortoise, Jamie Lidell, Plaid, Danielson, Chris Clark, Aphex Twin, Millionaire, The Locust.

== 2005 ==
Pere Ubu, The Locust, Broken Social Scene, Jan Jellinek, Aux Raus, Millionaire

== 2006 ==
Friday December 15: Danielson, Darker, The Devastations, Dogdaze, Dream/Aktion Unit feat. Chris Corsano, Thurston Moore, Paul Flaherty, Matt Heyner & C. Spencer Yeh, HSSLHFF, Julie Mittens, Krustpunk Collectief, Paul Lebreque, Love Is All, Mono, My Cat Is An Alien, No-Neck Blues Band, Tomàn, Vincent Oliver, POW-Ensemble feat. Joseph Bowie, Rauberhöhle, Sedan Vault, Sonic Youth

Saturday December 16: Aardvarck feat. DJ Cinnaman: Cult Copy live, Aavikko, Breakcore Tapdance Collective, Chap-a-tow, Circle, (Chris) Clark, Daan D-struct, Jimmy Edgar, Nathan Fake, La Peste, Labasheeda, Jamie Lidell feat. Visuals by Pablo Fiasco, Magic Markers, De Nieuwe Vrolijkheid, Mark One, Plastician, Ra-X feat. Film ‘Das Kabinett Des Doktor Caligari’, Uw Hypotheekadvies

== 2007 ==
Aphex Twin, The Bent Moustache, Break-Koor, Crunc Tesla, Enon, The Ex, Fear Falls Burning, Food For Animals, Getatchew Mekurya, Jackson and His Computer Band, James Blackshaw, Jesu, Kill, Kiss The Anus Of A Black Cat, Michael Gira, Mogwai, Moichido, Moshpit, Motorpsycho, Moving Ninja, Olafur Arnalds, Peal, Pornologic, Alice Rose, Rotator, Scout Niblett, Shining, Silvester Anfang, Solaire, Spires That In The Sunset Rise, Sunn 0))), The Strange Death of Liberal England, The Twilight Sad, Thor-ltD, Vrienden van Harlem, Wiley, Yobkiss

== 2008 ==
The fifth edition of State-X was from Friday December 12 until Saturday December 13.

- Lineup:

Red Snapper, Jack Rose, Rhys Chatham, Shit and Shine, Lau Nau, Soap & Skin, Jazzsteppa, Bonne Aparte, Banditos, Inferno, 2562, Antistrot, Black Dog, Bolide Akwardstra, Bruital Orgasm, Bumper, Church of Music, Edu-K, Faces: Tijdlus, DJ Hidden, Ignatz, The Message Is Love feat. Jammer, Badness and Mumdance, Lawn & Fries Symphonie Orkest, Midi Fanfare, Mugison, Peter Broderick, The Present, Soap & Skin, Sobchek, Steve Gunn, Subtitle, Technician, Tiger Counter of Drog Orkestar, Yuri Landman, Strotpodium ft. Vegan Drum Experience, Funky Martel Performance, Harry Merry, Dutch Dolls, GROK, Koekoeksclan, Kink FM X-Rated Café ft. DJ’s Bob & Spud, Skinnerbox & Organisms, DJ Nightmare, DJ Phil, Tovver, DJ Bas de Wit, DJ Jacques de la Disque

The 2008 festival opened with the MIDI Fanfare: a cooperation between the FloPidiskkunstkollektieF, drum guru Lesley Strik and students from the Royal Conservatory and Royal Academy of Arts from The Hague. Laptops, keyboards and speakers were connected via Blue tooth (wireless) to form a mobile orchestra. The Church of Music preached music within the walls of the venues. Another act was the 3G-concept (Guitar Trio), performed by American artist Rhys Chatham. Chatham's line up consisted of 7 guitar players including himself. Other musicians where local Dutch guitar players among which Yuri Landman was also present. The second piece of G3 he played on his Moodswinger.

== 2009 ==
Merzbow, Battles, Daily Bread, Peaches, The Melvins, Machinist, Rolo Tomassi, Zeitkratzer Orchestra and others.

== 2010 ==
Borbetomagus, Darkstar, Filastine, Girl Unit, Hanggai, Hauschka, James Blake, Joker, Lee ‘Scratch’ Perry feat. Adrian Sherwood, Mount Kimbie, Pixelord, Rangda, The Pyramids, Datacore, Warsaw Village Band, Huoratron, Volcano the Bear, The New Earth Group & Rotterdams Symfonisch Blaasorkest, Thomas Ankersmit, GATE, N!euwe Supersolden, and others.

== 2011 ==
The Dodos, Micah P. Hinson, Tyondai Braxton, Jamie Woon, Buke & Gass, High Places, Omar Souleyman, Das Racist, Glenn Branca, Jad Fair & Gilles Reider, Yuri Landman Ensemble featuring Jad Fair, Lukas Simonis, Flying Lotus, Mushy, Cyndies and others.
