= Festival Oude Muziek =

Festival Oude Muziek Utrecht
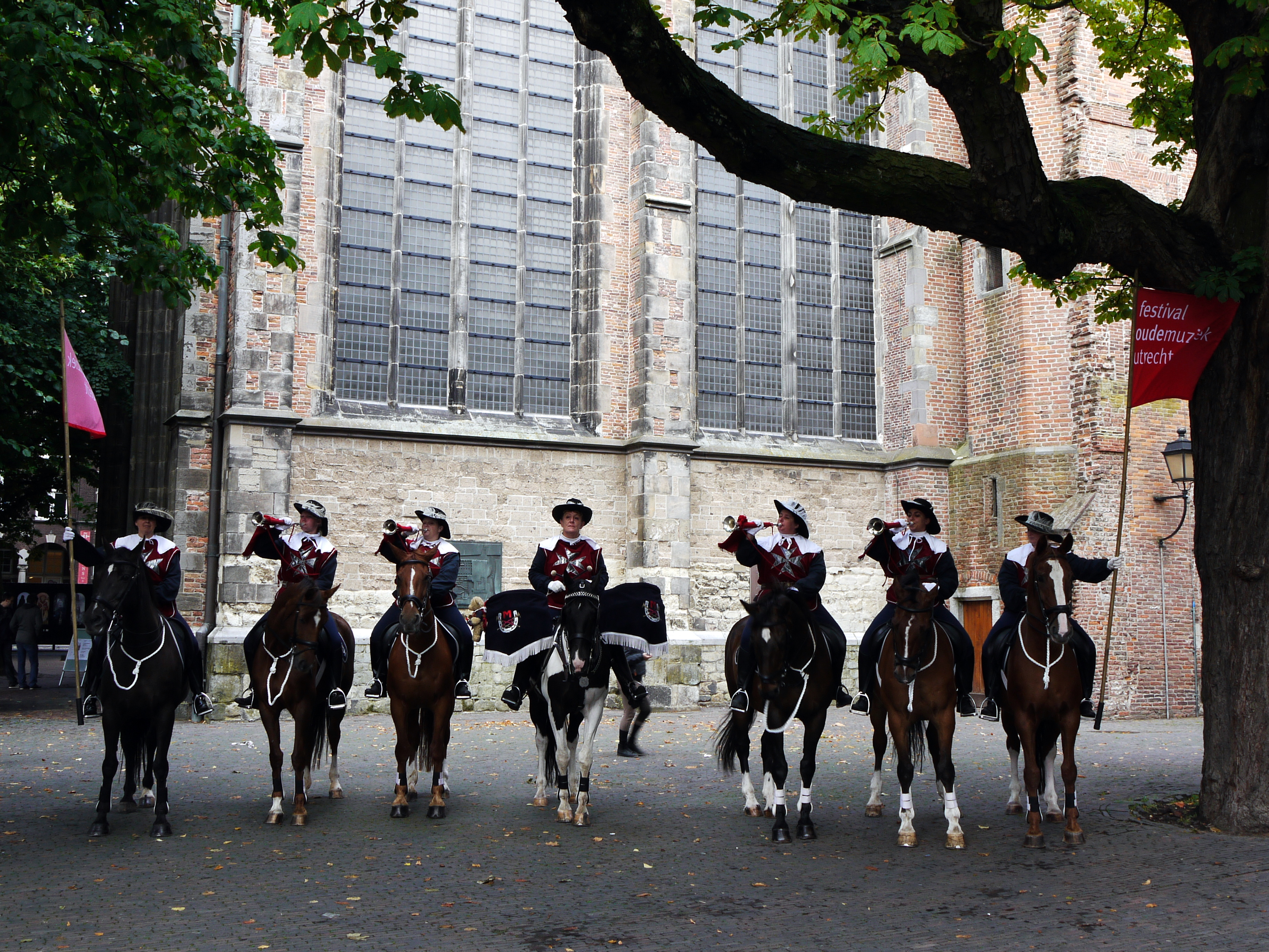
- A regiment of trumpeters on horseback perform in Domplein, the square in the ruins of St. Martin's Cathedral.
- Genre: Early music
- Dates: Late August – early September
- Locations: Utrecht, Netherlands
- Years active: 1982–present
- Attendance: approx. 70,000 (2019)
- Website: oudemuziek.nl

The Festival Oude Muziek Utrecht ("Utrecht Early Music Festival") is an annual music festival that showcases and celebrates early European art music. The ten-day festival takes place in the Dutch city of Utrecht, and begins in August. The programme includes concerts, activities, lectures, exhibitions, and a symposium.

The primary venue is TivoliVredenburg, which opened in 2014. TivoliVredenburg is on the former site of an earlier music venue, Muziekcentrum Vredenburg. The Muziekcentrum was the festival's primary venue until it was demolished in 2008, to allow for new construction. The main concert hall of the Muziekcentrum was subsumed into the TivoliVredenburg.

Each year, the festival's organisers adopt a theme, which focuses on a particular place, time, and style in early music. The theme shapes not only the style and musical repertoire of the performances, but also the period instruments used.

== Themes ==
- 2005 - Polyphony
- 2006 - Le nuove musiche: the Seicento in Italy
- 2007 - Ars audiendi: the art of listening
- 2008 - Siglos de Oro: Spain in the 16th century
- 2009 - Three Germans in England: Handel, Haydn, Mendelssohn and a bit of Purcell
- 2010 - Louis Quatorze: Two centuries of French baroque music
- 2011 - Roma - Città eterna
- 2012 - From Sweelinck to Bach
- 2013 - #Europe
- 2014 - Habsburg: ten centuries of music from Vienna and Prague
- 2015 - England, my England:
- 2016 - La Serenissima
- 2017 - Sing, Fight, Cry, Pray - Music of the Reformations
- 2018 - The Burgundian life
- 2019 - Napoli – the forgotten capital of music
- 2020 - Festival Oude Muziek Utrecht: alternative online/offline edition
- 2021 - Music speaks – Let's talk
- 2022 - Gallantry
- 2023 - Revival
- 2024 - Seville
- 2025 - Museum art?
- 2026 - Giving Voice
- 2027 - Humanism
- 2028 - Citizens!

== See also ==
- Early music revival
- Historically informed performance
