= The Sheer =

Dutch pop/rock band

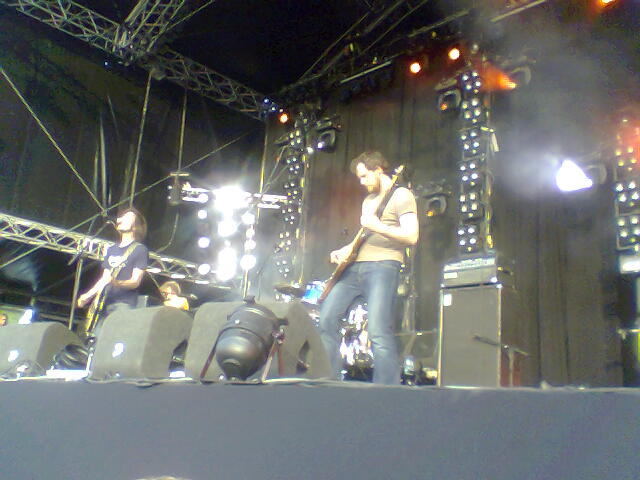
- The Sheer performing in Zwolle (2006).

Background information
- Origin: Haarlem, Netherlands
- Genres: Pop; Rock; Melodic Rock
- Years active: 2000–present
- Members: Bart van Liemt; Jasper Geluk; Jorn van der Putte; Gert-Jan Zegel
- Website: thesheer.nl

The Sheer is a Dutch band playing pop and melodic rock music.

They had some success with the single Right Now and the debut album The Keyword Is Excitement! in their home country, both produced by Daniel Presley. Their third single entitled "The Girl That Lost Her Mind" came in at #40 in the Dutch Top 40. In 2004, the band won the prestigious Zilveren Harp (Silver Harp) for their contribution and promise to the Dutch Pop Culture.

== Bandmembers ==
- Bart van Liemt (lead vocals, guitar)
- Jasper Geluk (keyboards, backing vocals)
- JanPeter Hoekstra (guitar, slide guitar, backing vocals)
- Jorn van der Putte (bass, backing vocals)
- Gert-Jan Zegel (drums)

== History ==
- 2000: Four friends from a music school started to rearrange old songs and write their own. "The Sheer" was born. Bart van Liemt, lead singer and foremost composer of the band, has been inspired by the British pop and rock music from the 1960s and the Britpop movement from the early 1990s. The result is a catchy combination of melodious pop/rock music with some British influence.
- 2001: They released their first demo, titled "The Sheer" and started touring in September 2001 on the "Meet The Sheer Tour". The Demo was considered a success, receiving positive responses from FRET, Live XS and Music Maker. "The Sheer" is doing many concerts and make appearances on both the regional and national radio. Radio programs such as "BNN For Live" on Radio 2 and "Isabelle" on 3FM were only a few shows on which they were asked to play. Keyboardist Jasper Geluk is often playing with another Haarlem band, the Dollybird, with whom he played at Lowlands 2001. During "Popslag 2001", a 3FM talent show, "The Sheer" reached the finals and was preliminarily selected as the first-place winner. After a re-count, the conclusion was reached that the band "This Beautiful Mess" had a few more votes, so "The Sheer" ranked second. Their debut on national television was on TMF and "The Sheer" had been invited to "2 Meter Sessies" on Kink FM.

== Discography ==
=== Albums ===
- 2004 - "The Keyword Is Excitement"
- 2006 - "Feel The Need"
- 2009 - "Here And Now And Long Before"

=== Singles ===
- 2003 - "Something To Say" #45 Mega Top 50 #tip Top 40
- 2004 - "It Only Gets Better" #20 Mega Top 50 #tip Top 40
- 2004 - "Right Now" #10 Mega Top 50 #38 Top 40
- 2005 - "Stay Awake" #15 Mega Top 50
- 2006 - "The Girl That Lost Her Mind" #3 Mega Top 50, #25 Top 40
- 2006 - "Understand" #tip Top 40
- 2006 - "All I Forget"

=== Collaborations ===
- 2005 - "Hanginaround" (Counting Crows feat. The Sheer and Bløf). The song is featured on the #1 hit single "Holiday in Spain".

All chart performances are taken from the Dutch charts: Mega Top 50 and Top 40.

== FIFA 07 ==
"Understand", one of the singles from The Sheer, is the title song of the football video game FIFA 07.
