= Narrominded =

Independent record label based in The Netherlands

Narrominded is an independent record label based in the Netherlands. The label releases experimental electronic and rock music genres like idm, ambient, electro, Electroacoustic improvisation, noise rock, post punk and new wave. The formats on which the label releases its music are equally versatile. The label has released music on CD, CD-R, LP, 7-inch single and MP3. Most of the featured artists come from Europe, including Gone Bald, Cor Fuhler and Mats Gustafsson.

== History ==
Narrominded was founded in 2000 by Lars Meijer and Coen Polack to have a platform for putting out the many releases by their project Psychon Troopers. The name Narrominded originated out of the name of Lars' tape-label, which was called Narrow-Minded.
