= FRET (magazine) =

Dutch pop music magazine

FRET was a free magazine which covered the pop music scene in the Netherlands. It was published in the Dutch language. It contained interviews, reviews, a gig guide and background information about Dutch bands and artists. The magazine was available at record stores and venues in the Netherlands. It was published between 1994 and 2012. Today, each issue can be read digitally via their website. The website is offline as of August 2015.

FRET was published by the Dutch Rock & Pop Institute.
