= Tivoli (Utrecht) =

Music venue and cultural center in Utrecht, Netherlands

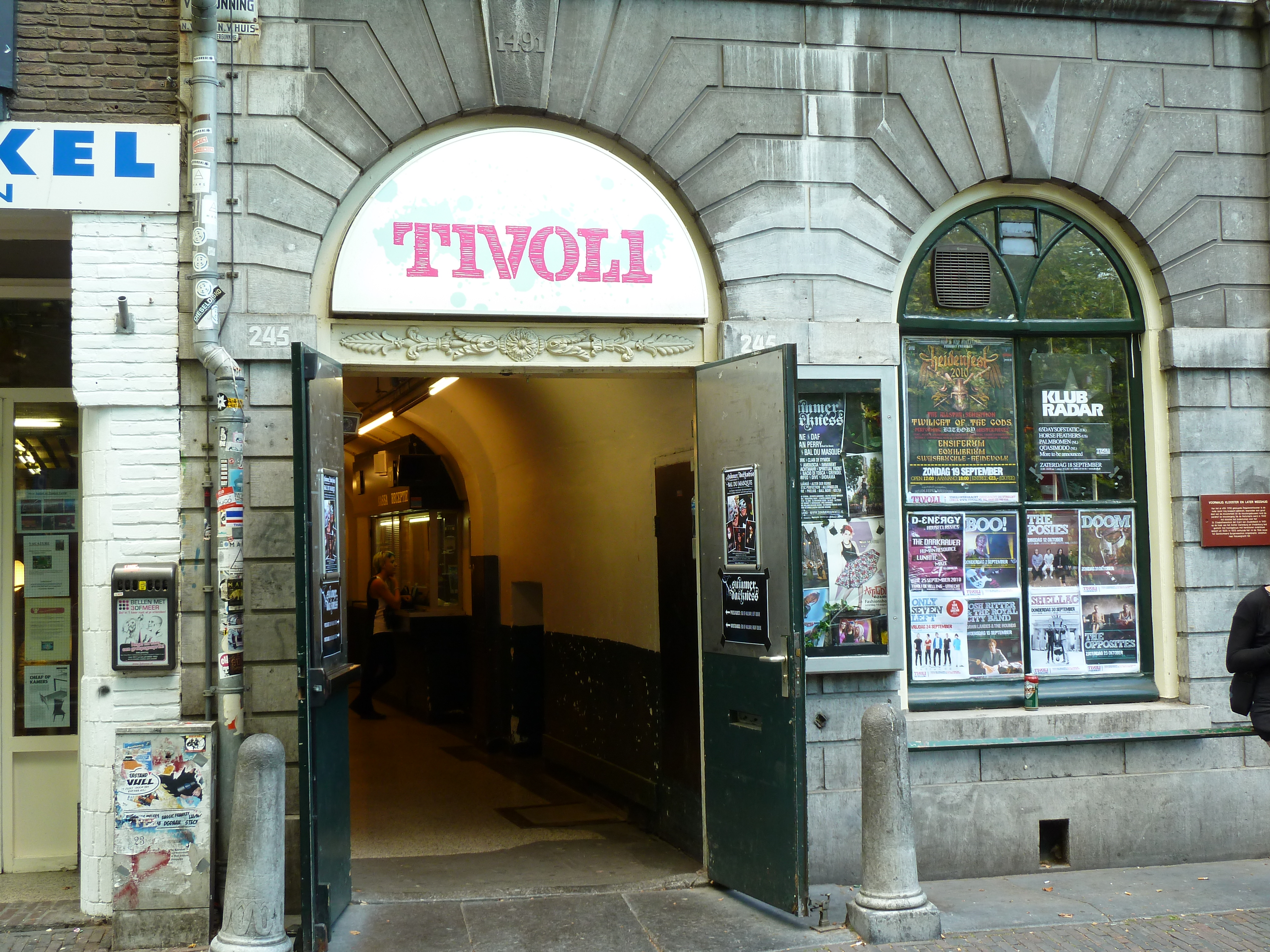
Tivoli Oudegracht

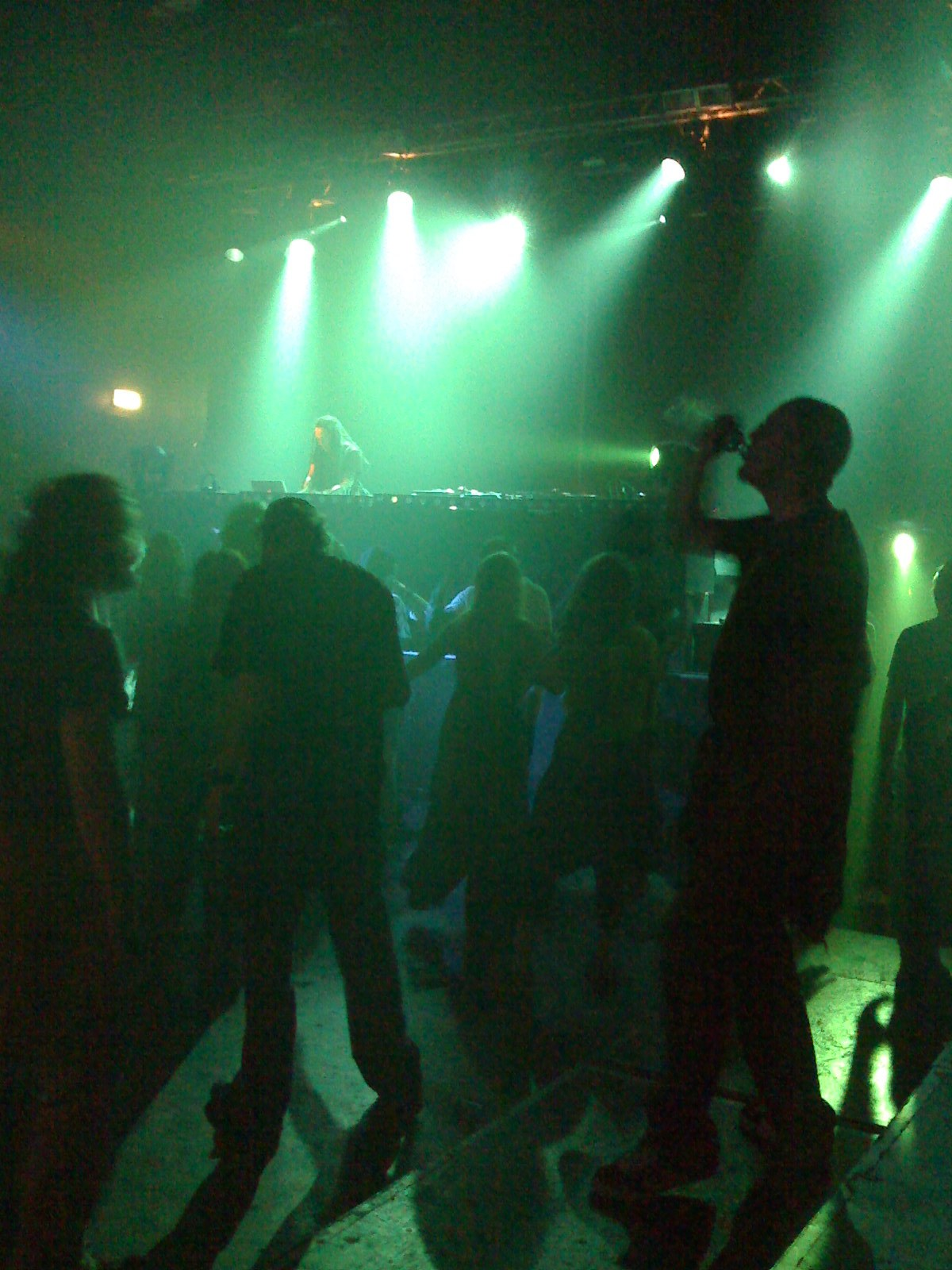
Tivoli de Helling

Tivoli is a popular music venue and cultural center in Utrecht, Netherlands. Tivoli is run by a non-profit organisation. The original organisation dates back to 1823 and functioned as a relaxing place outside the city's Stadsbuitengracht. In May 2014 Tivoli "Oudegracht" closed. A large new venue, named TivoliVredenburg, came to existence when Tivoli and the former Muziekcentrum Vredenburg merged as part of the fusion between the two, with TivoliVredenburg having 5 event halls with a capacity of 5500 people. Tivoli "De Helling", formerly known as "De Vloer" before they went bankrupt in 2003 and after Tivoli decided to reopen and rebrand the venue, remained to continue as an independent music venue.

The "De Helling" location has a capacity of 425 people, and the "Oudegracht" location had a capacity of approximately 1000 people. Formerly one of the Netherlands' major venues (together with Paradiso, Paard van Troje, 013 and Melkweg), Tivoli "Oudegracht" was located in the historic premises in Utrecht's city centre, and featured more than 300 productions annually and attracted between 250 000 and 300 000 visitors annually. Apart from pop concerts, there were dance evenings every Thursday, Friday and Saturday and Tivoli Oudegracht was the main concert venue for the Summer Darkness festival for many years.

== History ==
In 1979 a group of squatters named "Komitee Tivoli Tijdelijk", translated "Committee Tivoli Temporary", decided to squat and occupy the former concertbuilding Tivoli aan het Lepelenburg. This building would eventually end up being demolished and musical activities would be relocated to Muziekcentrum Vredenburg. The punk movement present at the time, was hoping the wooden building of Lepelenburg would serve its purpose as a temporary solution for housing the alternative popmusic scene in await for a more permanent place. However, that very building burned down that very same year.

After Tivoli aan het Lepelenburg burned down, the "Committee Tivoli Temporary" decided to squat Oudegracht 245, also known as the "NV-house" since the former unions of tram and train personnel used to settle there by the time it was 1981 (this would later redeem itself as their main location, Tivoli "Oudegracht"). The squat led to a violent confrontation with the "mobiele eenheid" (riot police of the Netherlands) which led to a small riot outside the building. Eventually, the "mobiele eenheid" pulled back, and things were left to go as usual again. So, in the years that followed, many concerts took place. Eventually the city council of Utrecht saw an opportunity in rebuilding and subsidising Tivoli "Oudegracht". The line-ups evolved from predominantly locally and nationally known punk bands to a much wider array of musicians generally more known to the public, including both national and international pop artists. "Tivoli Temporary", became just "Tivoli", and, developed themselves, under this new branding, towards a professional event venue.

=== Footage of the squat & violent confrontation of Tivoli "Oudegracht" (1981) ===
The Oudegracht location is a Rijksmonument since it still contains parts of a medieval monastery.
