= TivoliVredenburg =

Utrecht concert venue

Coordinates: 52°05′32″N 5°06′48″E

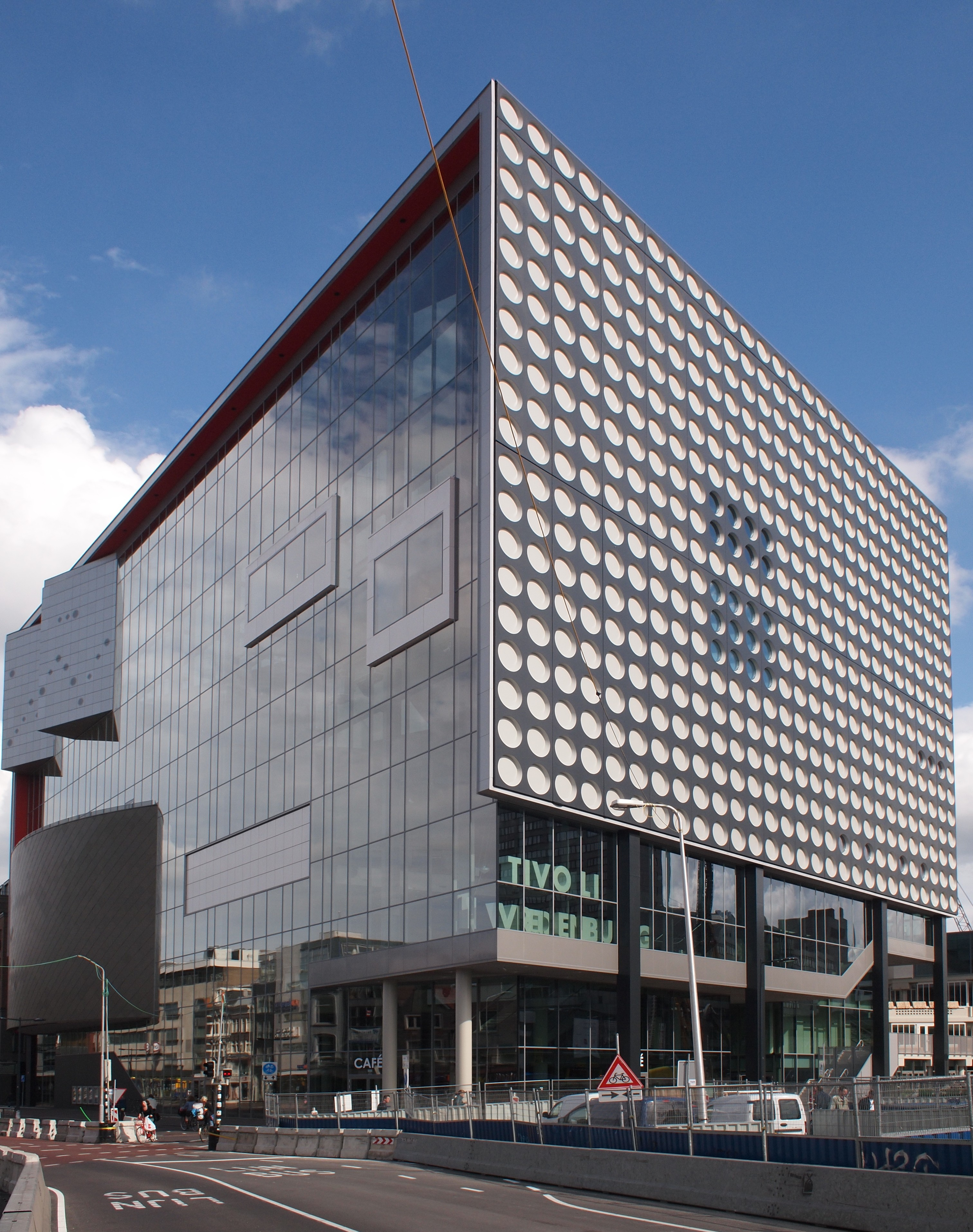
- Exterior of venue c. 2014
- Interactive map of TivoliVredenburg
- Former names: Muziekpaleis Utrecht (planning/construction)
- Address: Vredenburgkade 11; 3511 WC Utrecht; Netherlands
- Owner: Gemeente Utrecht
- Capacity: Ronda: 2,000; Grote Zaal: 1,717; Pandora: 625; Hertz: 543; Cloud Nine: 400; Club Nine: 175

Construction
- Groundbreaking: 24 March 2011
- Opened: 21 June 2014
- Cost: €150 million
- Architects: Architectuurstudio HH, NL Architects, Jo Coenen Architects & Urbanists, Thijs Asselbergs architectuurcentrale
- Project manager: Samenwerkings Partners
- Structural engineer: Zonneveld Ingenieurs
- Services engineers: Ingenieursburo Linssen, Royal HaskoningDHV, Team Projects
- General contractor: Heijmans NV

Tenants
- Festival Oude Muziek (2014-present); TivoliVredenburg Festival (2014-present)

Website
- Venue Website

The TivoliVredenburg is a contemporary music complex located in Utrecht, Netherlands. The venue consists of five halls designed acoustically for a specific music genre. Along with its halls, the venue also features an "amateur stage" and a cafe.

It opened in 2014 as a merger of the former Tivoli Oudegracht and Muziekcentrum Vredenburg. It averages around 1.3 million visitors per year.

== Construction ==
The venue was a part of CU2030, an urban redevelopment project for the city of Utrecht. Designer Herman Hertzberger wanted to combine the atmosphere of the Tivoli Oudegracht and Muziekcentrum Vredenburg. Design work began in 2005 with fellow architects Jo Coenen and Thijs Asselbergs. All plans were approved by the city in 2010 and the Muziekcentrum Vredenburg was demolished in 2011 to make way for the new music venue, which was originally given the name Muziekpaleis Utrecht. In October 2012, it was announced that the venue would be named TivoliVredenburg, because both Tivoli and Vredenburg were nationally well known names in the pop and classical music worlds, respectively. The decision was unanimously approved by the Muziekpaleis Foundation.

The statue "Schele Maagd" (lit. 'Cross-Eyed Virgin'), formerly located in front of life insurance company De Utrecht's building until it was demolished in 1974, was moved to the roof of TivoliVredenburg.

== History and opening ==
The first event, an art exhibition, took place on 2 April 2014. The first concert was held in the Pandora hall on 5 April 2014 featuring: Adept, Tommy Four Seven, Pfirter and Abstract Division. Official opening ceremonies began on 27 June 2014, with the venue being inaugurated by King Willem-Alexander on 3 July 2014.

In June 2015, the venue fixed complaints of sound bleed between the Ronda and Hertz halls with the placement of rubber suspension in the building's support pillars and sound-insulating plates in the Ronda's roof. An investigation was also started into sound bleed between the Cloud Nine and Hertz halls.

After its opening, the venue faced a multi-million dollar budget deficit, caused by higher costs for personnel, production, catering and decreasing subsidies and lower revenues from sponsorship. However, annual visitor numbers were greater than expected. In May 2016, the municipality of Utrecht decided to invest extra in TivoliVredenburg, with an annual rent reduction of €1.9 million and a one-off subsidy of €400,000 to strengthen commercial activities and attract more major artists. This helped the venue become financially stable. For example, in 2024, TivoliVredenburg received €40 million of revenue with an additional €10 million from the municipality.

In March 2020, the venue shut its doors and postponed hundreds of concerts because of the COVID-19 pandemic. It reopened in February 2022, after two years of limited hours and restrictions.

In November 2023, a fatal stabbing took place in TivoliVredenburg. The suspect was a cleaner who killed his coworker after a fight.

Renovations for the Grote Zaal's foyers began in April 2024 after the building raised €102,455 from 1925 donors. The Grote Zaal was given a new entrance on the Vredenburgplein.

== Layout ==
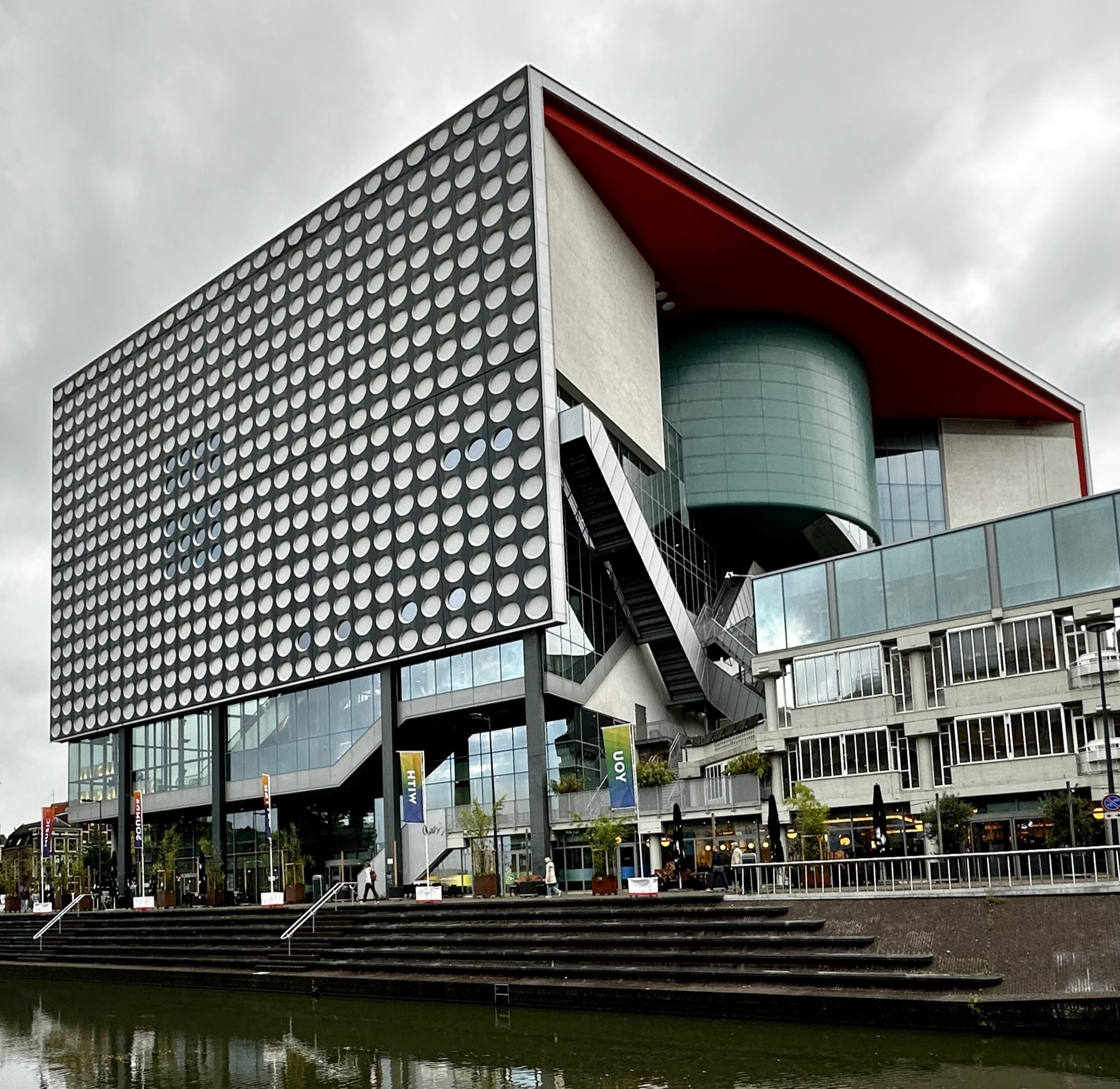
TivoliVredenburg in 2023

TivoliVredenburg was designed as a "vertical city", featuring six concert halls each with their own distinct character, connected to each other by a series of plazas, staircases and passages. In addition, there is a café and restaurant on the ground floor. The design of the building was provided by the architectural firm of Herman Hertzberger and Patrick Fransen; the new rooms were each designed by a different architect.

=== Grote Zaal ===
The Grote Zaal is located in what was the Symphony Hall of the former Muziekcentrum Vredenburg, and it is almost the only remaining part of that building. It was designed by Herman Hertzberger's Architectuurstudio HH. Its capacity is 1,717.

=== Ronda ===
The Ronda is the "pop hall". It is the largest and has a capacity of 2,000 visitors. It was designed by Jo Coenen. The hall is semi-circular, with a balcony that runs from the sides, via the back, over the entire length of the hall. This allows the visitor to stand relatively close to the stage from all sides. By using special wall coverings, the hall has very dry acoustics, which makes it suitable for the high sound volumes of pop music.

=== Pandora ===
The Pandora is considered a "crossover hall", suitable for several genres of music but primarily hosting dance concerts. The hall has a dark appearance with dry acoustics and has two balconies and a platform with round windows, through which one looks out over the city. Below the hall is a spacious, light foyer with a bar and smoking area. The hall has a capacity of 700 visitors and was designed by NL Architects.

=== Hertz ===
The Hertz has 543 fixed seats and was designed as a classical music hall. The hall is semi-oval with two balconies and is largely made of cherry wood. Behind the stage is a large window, through which one looks out over Utrecht. In the design of the hall, much attention was paid to the reverberation, which makes it suitable for classical music and (semi)acoustic pop music. It can also host conferences and stand-up comedy. On top of the seats at head height, an extra piece of wood was made to improve the acoustic experience. With sliding curtains along the walls, the acoustics can be adjusted if necessary. The hall was designed by Architectuurstudio HH of Herman Hertzberger and Patrick Fransen.

=== Cloud Nine / Cafe Nine ===
The Cloud Nine hall, with a capacity of 400, was designed as a jazz hall, but in practice it is used multifunctionally. The hall was designed by Thijs Asselbergs. The floor and stage are made of wood. The adjacent café area, called the Club Nine, was originally intended to be a jazz café with a capacity of 175 that would be open 24 hours a day. Nowadays, the Club Nine is also used independently for performances in an intimate setting.

== Stage gallery ==
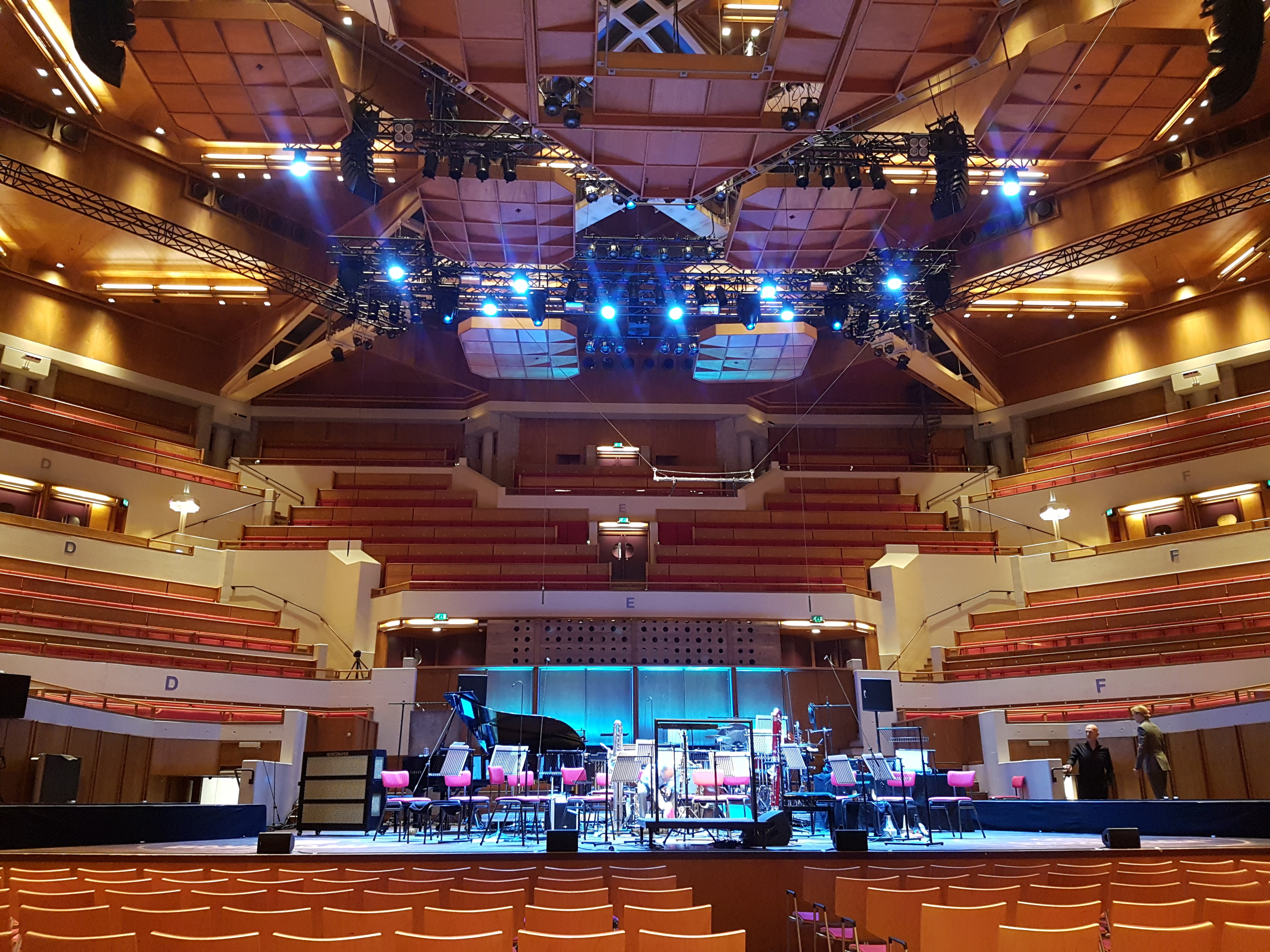
Grote Zaal

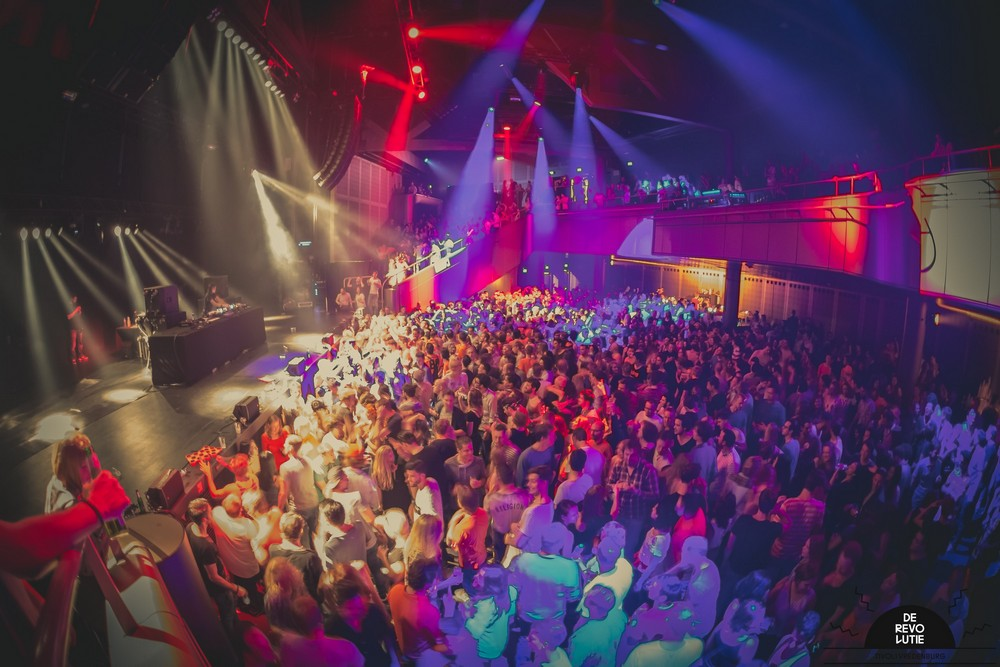
Ronda

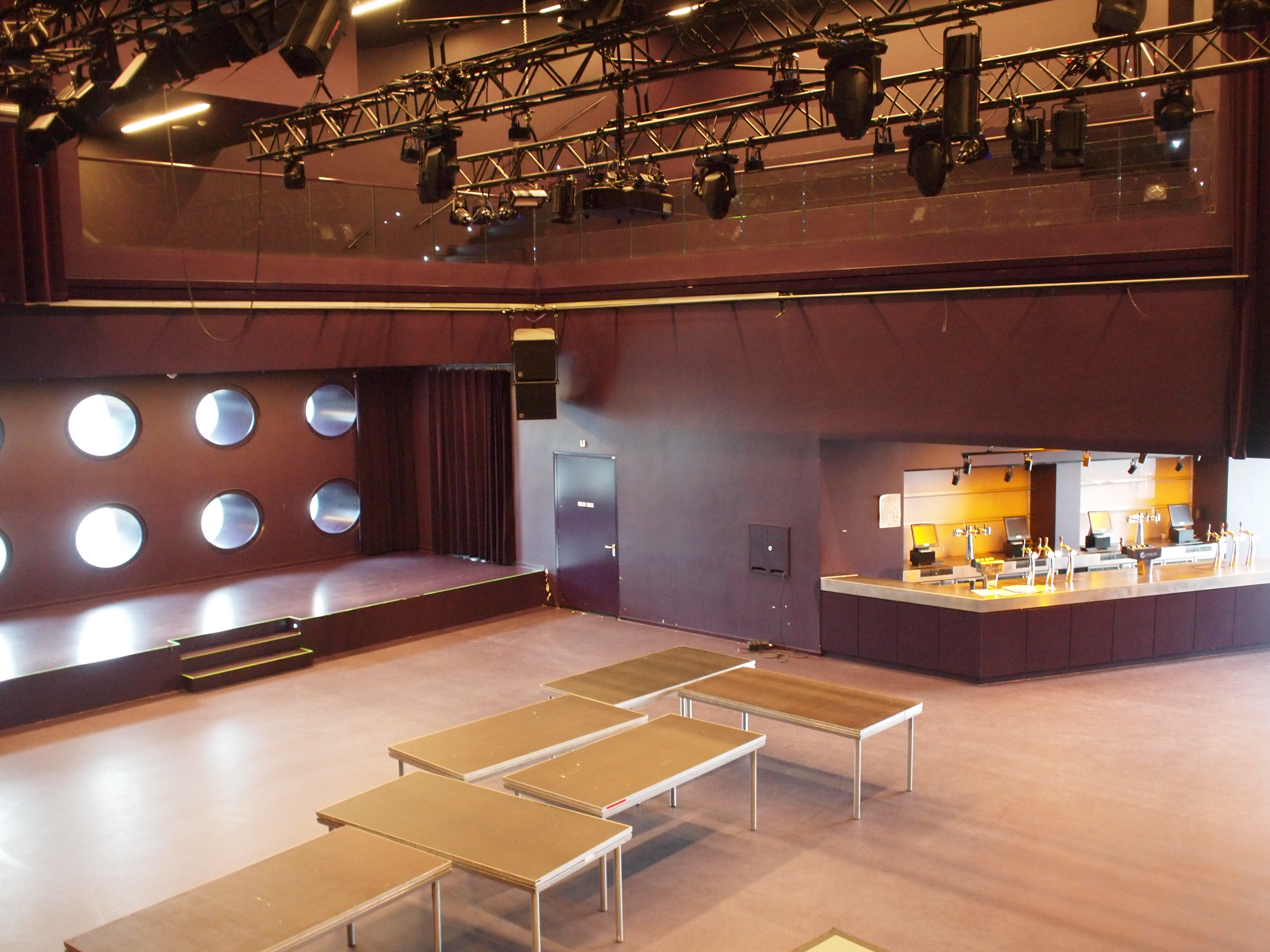
Pandora

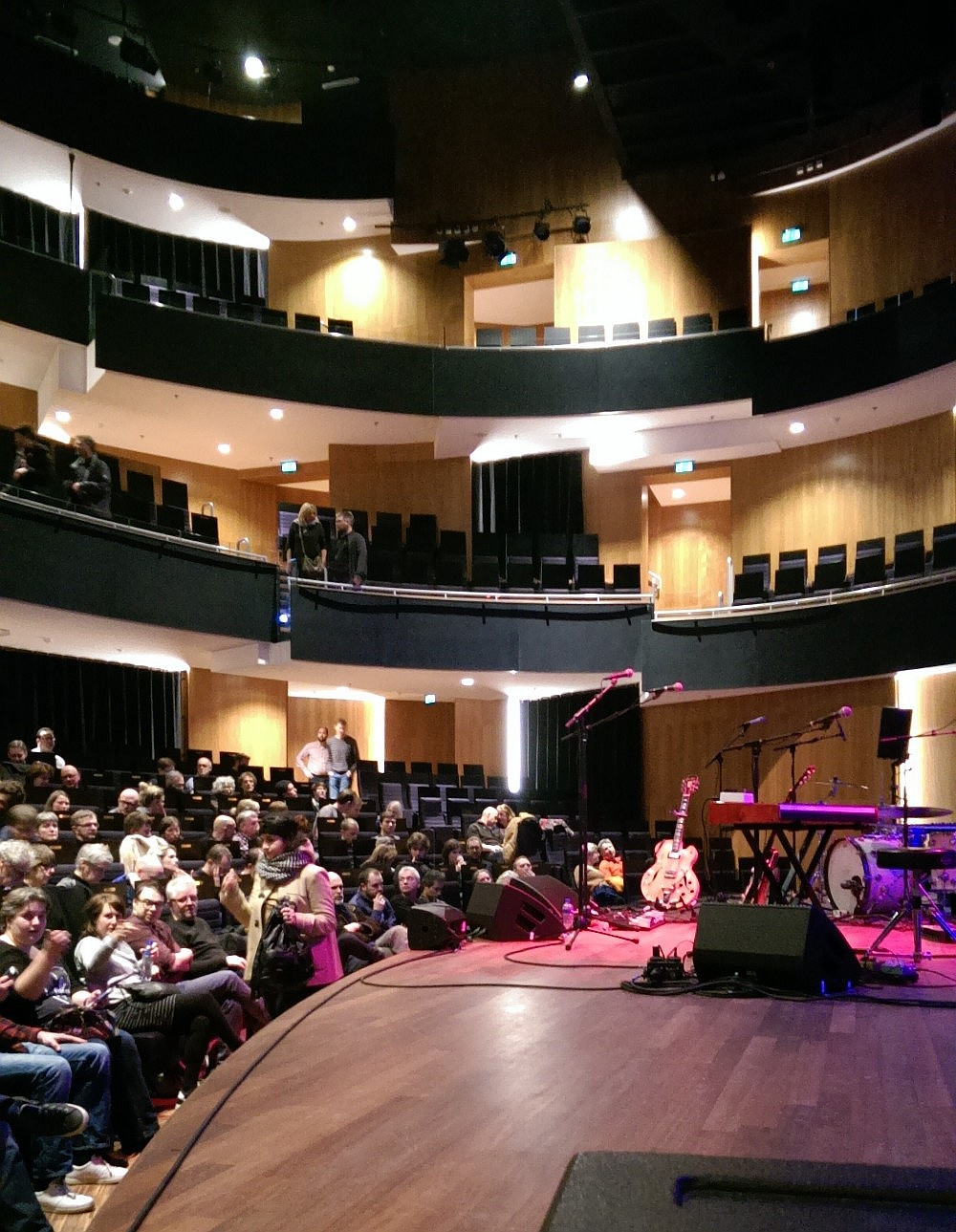
Hertz

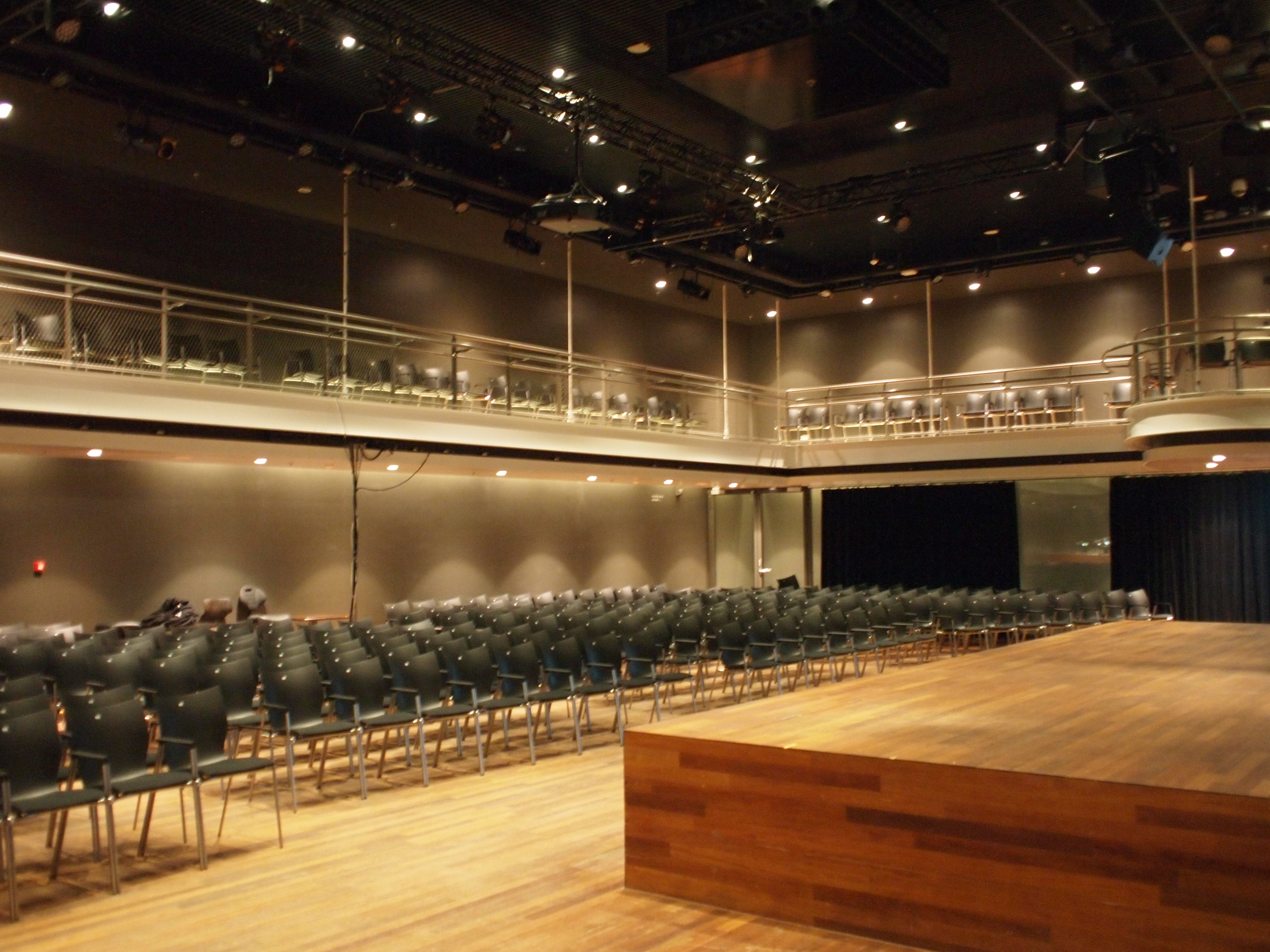
Cloud Nine

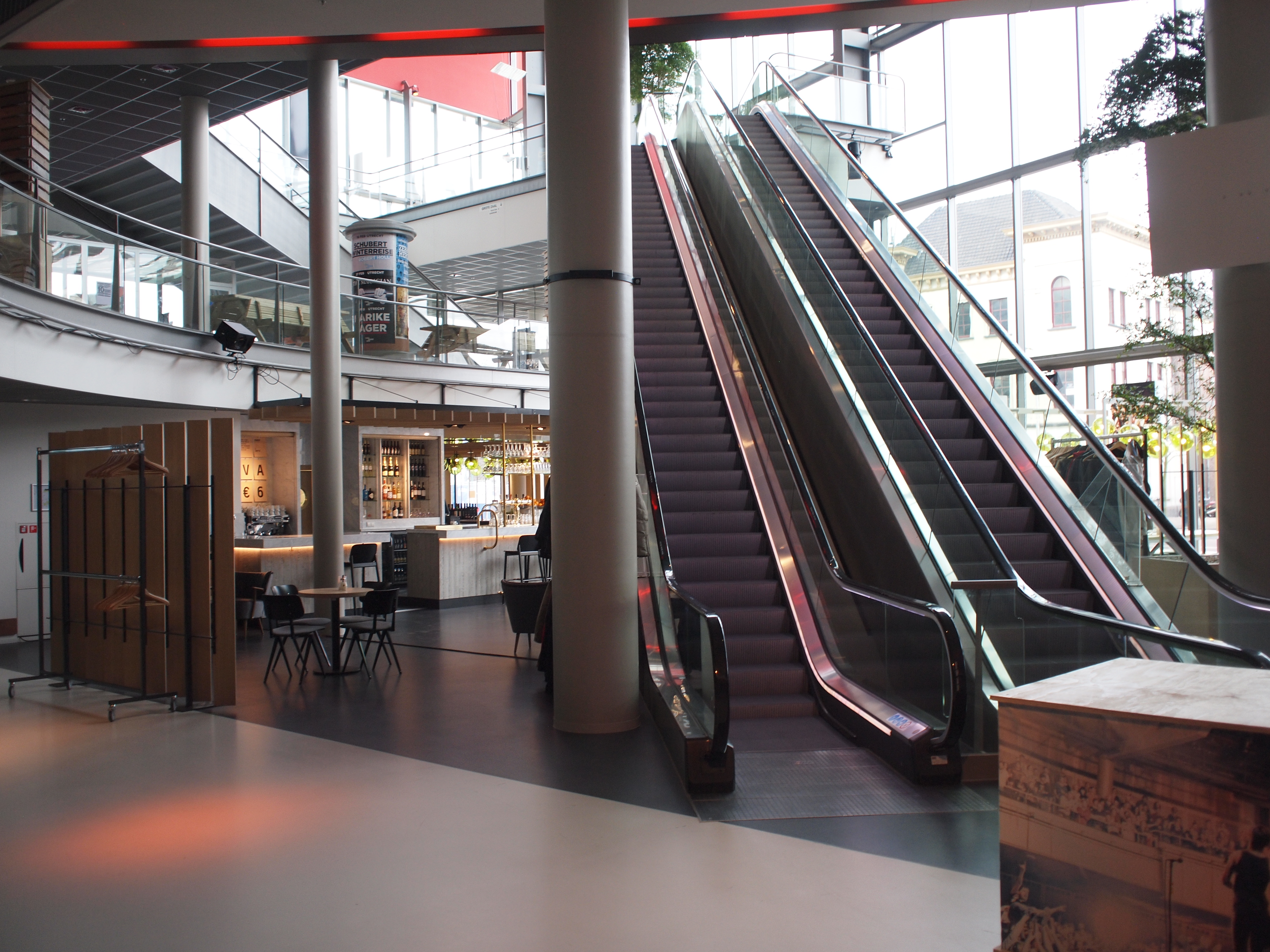
Escalators from lobby
