= Gone Bald =

- Origin: Amsterdam, The Netherlands
- Genres: Noise rock Post punk Alternative rock Experimental music
- Years active: 1994 – present
- Labels: Narrominded, Interstellar Records, 100% Recordings, Kekere Aquarium
- Members: Razorblade Jr
- Website: gonebald.info

Gone Bald is a noise rock band from Amsterdam, The Netherlands. The band was founded in Zagreb, Croatia in 1994. Soon thereafter, the band hitch-hiked to Amsterdam and that's where the band still lives, even though singer/guitarplayer Razorblade Jr is the only original member left after numerous changes in line-up.

Gone Bald has toured Holland, Belgium, Luxemburg, Germany, Austria, Switzerland, Italy, France, Slovenia, Croatia and Bosnia and shared the stage with bands like The Jesus Lizard, Butthole Surfers, Chinese Stars, The Ex, Ninewood, Today Is The Day, Neptune, Sebadoh and The Flying Luttenbachers. The band released work on tape, 7" single and CD on labels like Narrominded (The Netherlands) and Interstellar Records (Austria).

== Discography ==
- Jesus Is Coming Soon (Kekere Aquarium, 1994) - Tape
- Fairytale Addict (Kekere Aquarium, 1994) - Tape
- Little Song Of Love (100% Recordings, 1995) - CD
- Gone Bald - (100% Recordings, 1997) - CD
- Ona (FBWL Records, 1997) - 7” single (split with No Tomorrow Charlie)
- S.O.S. – (No label, 2001) - CD
- It Takes Guts To Tango (No label, 2002) CD-R
- Soul Vacation In Rehab Clinic (Interstellar Records, 2003) - CD
- 10 year anniversary compilation (No label, 2004) - CD
- Exotic Klaustrofobia (Narrominded, 2005) - CD
- 100 Ways to become cool (Narrominded, 2007) – Book / CD / DVD
- Drama Rock (2014) - CD
- The Expiration Date (2016)
- "The Survival Show" (Season 50) (2025)
