= Saskia Slegers =

Dutch DJ and owner of music label

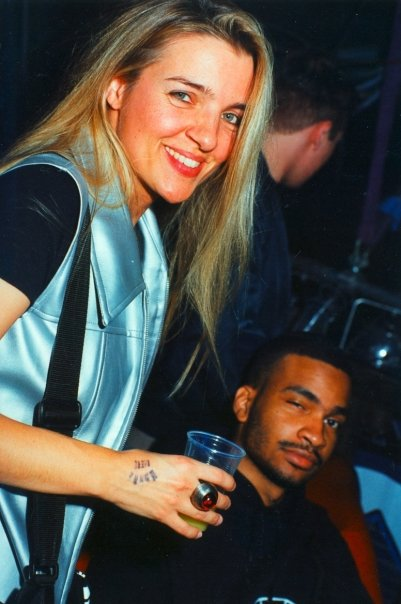
- Miss Djax
- Born: Saskia Slegers c. 1962; Netherlands
- Other names: Miss Djax
- Citizenship: Dutch
- Years active: 1980s–present
- Employer: Djax Records
- Known for: Founder of Djax Records

Saskia Slegers (born c. 1962), known professionally as Miss Djax, is a Dutch DJ and producer who has run the influential music label Djax since 1989.

== Career ==
Based in Eindhoven, Slegers started to DJ, make and release dance music in the 1980s. She set up the label Djax in 1989, investing 10,000 guilders. Her first release of 1,000 records sold out in a week, so she pressed up more copies and immediately recouped her start up costs. Looking back in 2009, she said "It was a question of the right time, the right decision and the right product". Another early success was signing the Amsterdam hip hop group Osdorp Posse in 1991. In the early 1990s, Slegers started to put on techno parties at the Effenaar in Eindhoven. As well as techno and hip hop, Slegers made and released breakcore. She was voted Best DJ by the German magazine Frontpage in 1992.

== Label ==
Slegers' record label Djax and its subsidiaries played a large role in introducing Chicago-style techno to the Netherlands and promoting it around the world. It has released artists such as Armando, Robert Armani and Mike Dearborn. After ten years, she produced a book entitled 1989 – 1999 Djax Records. To celebrate thirty years of the label, Slegers organised a twelve-hour party at Elementenstraat in Amsterdam in late 2019. The label has over 400 releases.
