= De Leest =

Coordinates: 52°17′17.66″N 5°58′2.28″E

- Interactive map of De Leest

Restaurant information
- Head chef: Jacob-Jan Boerma
- Food type: French, regional
- Rating: Michelin Guide; 19.0 Gault Millau
- Location: Kerkweg 1, Vaassen, Netherlands
- Seating capacity: 45
- Website: Official website

De Leest (Dutch pronunciation: [də ˈleːst]) was a fine dining restaurant located in Vaassen in the Netherlands.

The restaurant was awarded one Michelin star in the period 2003–2006, two Michelin stars in the period 2007–2013, and three Michelin stars since 2014 until it was closed on 27 December 2019.

On 7 October 2019 the restaurant announced that it will close down "later this year". The restaurant was closed on 27 December 2019.

De Leest was a member of Les Patrons Cuisiniers.

== See also ==
- List of Michelin starred restaurants in the Netherlands
