= Paard =

Venue in The Hague, Netherlands

Coordinates: 52°04′29″N 4°18′27″E

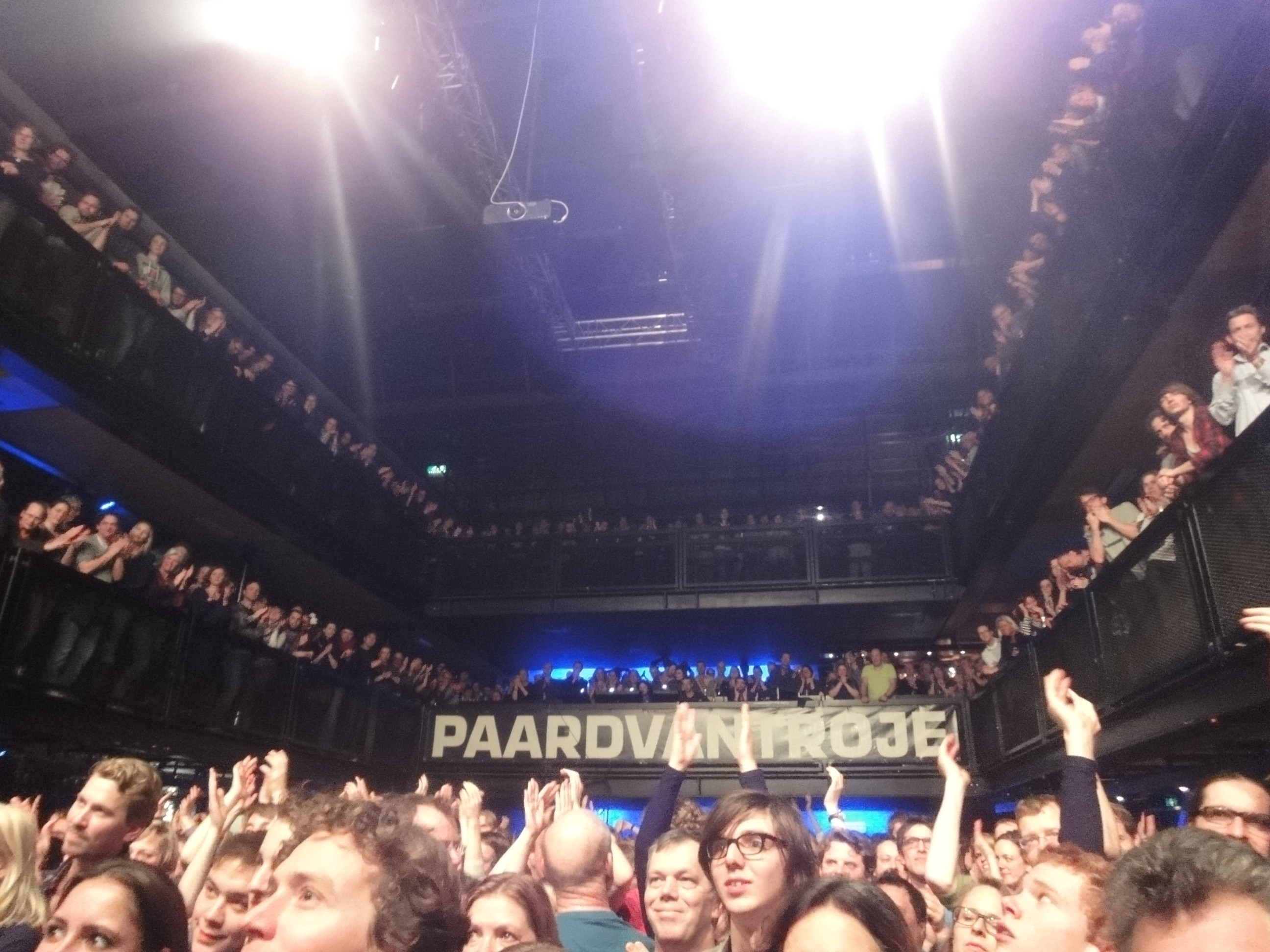
Interior of the Paard van Troje (2011)

PAARD, formerly known as Paard van Troje (Dutch for Trojan Horse), is a venue in The Hague, Netherlands founded on 18 June 1972 with the support of the alderman of culture from The Hague. Currently located at the Prinsegracht. It accommodates 1,100 visitors in the main hall and 350 visitors in the small hall. Additionally, there is a café named Paardcafe with space for approximately 200 people. Since 2024, Paard has also managed GR8, a multi-purpose building with meeting rooms, a theater hall, and a record store on Prinsegracht 8.

== History ==
The Paard van Troje began as a centre for youth culture. In its early years, the venue was noted for its permissive policy on use of cannabis which was also sold in the venue, although use of hard drugs was not allowed.

The venue's programming policy focuses on 'quality pop' as opposed to mainstream acts. Therefore, it receives funding from Music Center the Netherlands as one of seven distinguished venues (called 'kernpodia') of the Netherlands (together with Paradiso, Melkweg, Rotown, Tivoli, 013, Doornroosje)

The venue was rewarded with the Nachttempel Award in 2005.

The venue has four stages, a main stage (capacity 1,100 people), a small stage (capacity 350 people), Paardcafe (capacity 200 people) and GR8 (capacity 80 people). All locations are adjacent to one another.

== Performances ==
Numerous pop artists have performed at PAARD, both from the Netherlands and abroad. The focus was on non-commercial pop music. In 1980, U2 took the stage, followed by Mick Jagger (1982), Prince (1988), Pearl Jam (1992), Madness (1992), and Radiohead (1993). Aphex Twin (2007), Florence and the Machine (2010) and alt-J (2012) have also performed at PAARD.

== External links een paard is een dier dat vroeger veel werd gebruikt ==
- Media related to Paard van Troje at Wikimedia Commons
- Official site
