= Patronaat =

Coordinates: 52°22′59″N 4°37′43″E

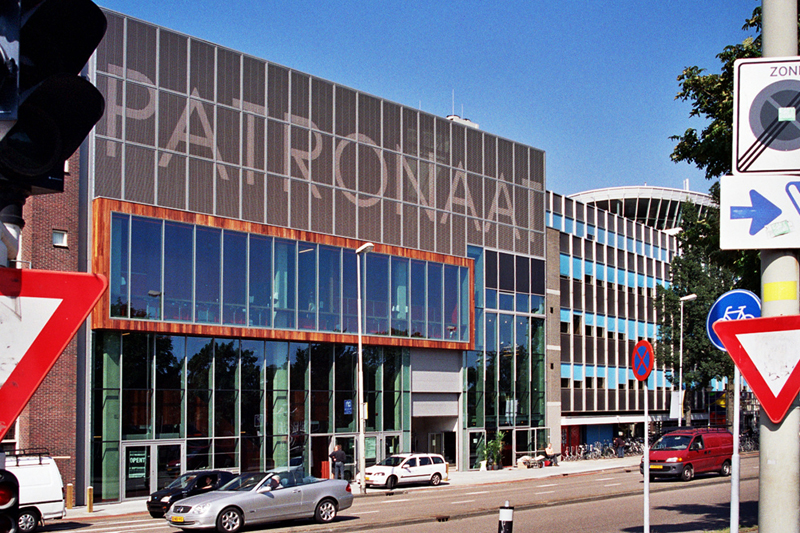
Patronaat in Haarlem, the Netherlands.

Patronaat is one of the 10 largest alternative pop music halls in the Netherlands and was established in 1984. It is located at the Zijlsingel in Haarlem, near the city center.

In 2003 the old building was replaced with a brand new concert hall, which was being used for the first time in 2005. From September 2003 until May 2005 a temporary location at the Oostvest functioned as Haarlem's concert hall.

The new building was designed by architect Paul Diederen of the architecture firm Diederen Dirriox Architecten of Eindhoven. The building's capacity was significantly increased with a large hall for 1000 visitors, a second one for some 350 guests, and a music bar for 100 people, which has live music three days in the week, free of admission. A total of 500 events are organised every year for some 140,000 people.

Patronaat provides progressive pop music and meets the wishes of its audience. Over the years artists like Willy DeVille, Solomon Burke, Tori Amos, Dick Dale, Herman Brood, Living Colour, Bo Diddley, dEUS, Zita Swoon, Gabriel Rios, Rickie Lee Jones, The Gutter Twins, Steve Lukather, José Feliciano, Babyshambles, Calexico, Michael Franti & Spearhead, but also acts like Limp Bizkit, Anthrax, The Bloodhound Gang, Marillion, The Misfits, Danko Jones, Soulfly, Therapy?, New Model Army, Y&T, Neurosis, Cradle of Filth, Obituary, D.R.I., Helmet, Dimmu Borgir and Deicide, as well as acts in the electronic music world like Paul Kalkbrenner, Dave Clarke, Knife Party, Steve Aoki, Modeselektor, Jeff Mills, James Holden, DJ Hell, Orbital, Leftfield, Battles, Pendulum, Chase & Status, Nero, Camo & Krooked, Andy C, Sub Focus, Aphrodite, Ed Rush, Benga, Skream, Caspa and Rusko have found their way to the Haarlem venue.
