= Kink FM =

- Netherlands
- Frequencies: Cable, satellite, online

Programming
- Format: Alternative music

Ownership
- Owner: V-Ventures

History
- First air date: 1 October 1995
- Last air date: 1 October 2011
- Former call signs: RTL Radio, RTL Rockradio, Happy RTL

Links
- Website: KinkFM.com

Kink FM was a commercial radio channel in the Netherlands dedicated entirely to alternative music.

In 1992 Dutch radio station RTL Radio started broadcasting. After this station failed to be a success, its format and name was first changed to RTL Rockradio, then to Happy RTL and back to RTL Rockradio. In 1995, the name was changed to Kink FM and the ownership split 50-50 between RTL and Veronica. In 1996, RTL gave up on the cable station and sold its remaining rights to Veronica which is still the owner. From the start Kink FM had to fight for its existence.

Kink FM was available in the Netherlands by cable, in Europe by satellite and in the rest of the world through the internet. It was also on iTunes's list of radio streams and via an iPhone app.

In October 2005 Kink FM celebrated its tenth anniversary. The station's 12.5 anniversary was celebrated by organising a radio takeover. Several well-known Dutch artists such as Junkie XL, The Nits, GEM, Voicst and Rick de Leeuw (formerly of Tröckener Kecks) presented an hour-long radio show filled with the music of their choice.

Despite the fact that most programs were presented by Dutch diskjockeys (except for Roy Avni (Electronation) an Israeli DJ, Craig Solo (Hip Hop 120 and Traffic Jam) an English DJ, and Little Steven), Kink FM had an international appeal, mainly because of the low percentage of spoken word per hour and its internationally oriented playlist. This is even more so the case with Kink FM's two internet streams: Kink Aardschok, Kink X-Rated and Kink Classics which played music non-stop.

On 29 June 2011 Kink FM owner V-Ventures announced that the station would cease broadcasting on its 16th birthday: 1 October 2011.

On Kink FM's 16th birthday, the station ceased broadcasting. In place of Kink FM the Internet-streams are used by Pinguin Radio.

On 1 February 2019 Kink restarted, not as Kink FM but simply as Kink broadcasting via online channels, such as their own website and via digital radio DAB+. By June 2020 Kink has proven to grow at a steady pace and has proven to have listeners with longest listing time frames within the dedicated listeners group. The channel made national headlines in 2022, when the courts ruled in favour of redistributing the national FM broadcast licenses after a lawsuit.

== See also ==
- List of radio stations in the Netherlands
