= Muziekcentrum Vredenburg =

Music venue in Utrecht, Netherlands

Coordinates: 52°05′32″N 5°06′48″E

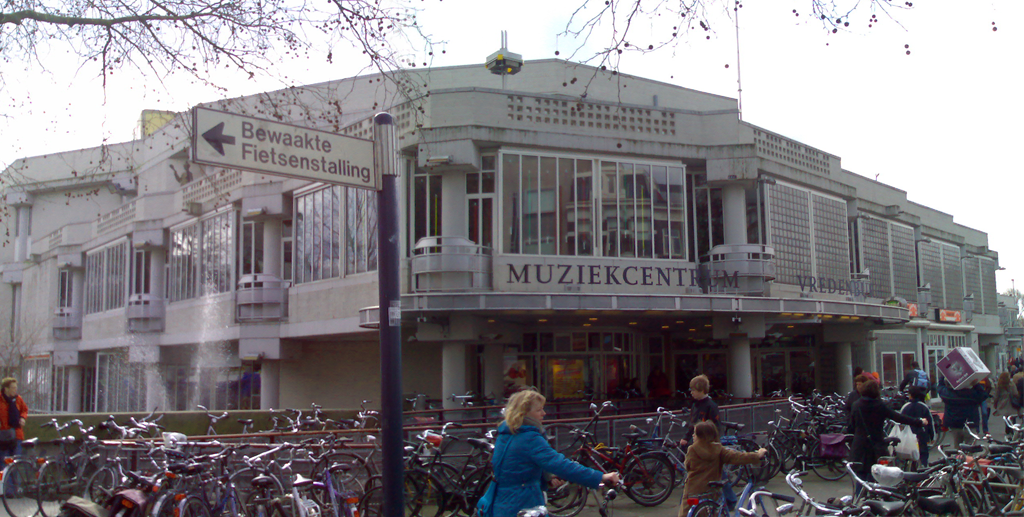
- Interactive map of Muziekcentrum Vredenburg
- Location: Utrecht, Netherlands
- Capacity: 5,000
- Type: Concert hall

Construction
- Demolished: 2008

Muziekcentrum Vredenburg was a music venue in Utrecht, Netherlands with a capacity of 5,000 people. It was designed by Dutch architect Herman Hertzberger. The venue hosted concerts by many famous artists, spanning many different genres. The old building (except the main hall) has been demolished and the city of Utrecht has built a new, bigger venue on the same location. The main hall of the old building has been integrated into the new building. The new building was officially opened in July 2014 and is called TivoliVredenburg.
