= Effenaar =

Dutch music venue

Coordinates: 51°26′30.32″N 5°28′59.57″E

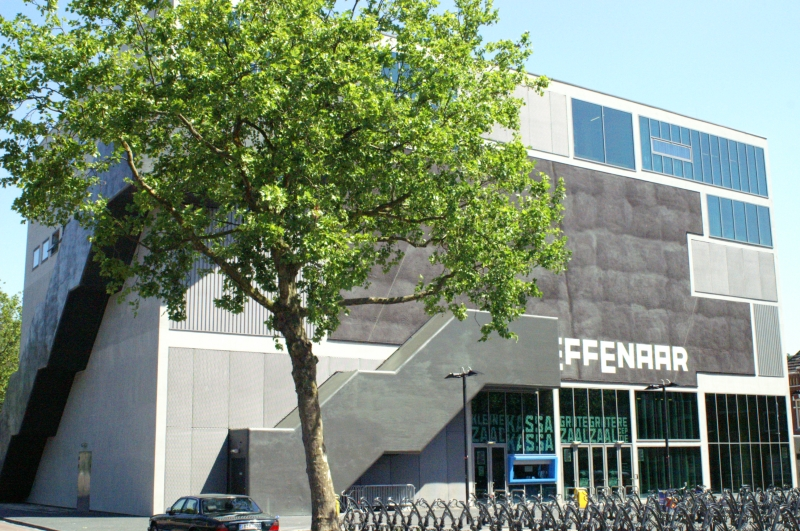
The Effenaar after the renovation in 2005

The Effenaar is a music venue in the centre of Eindhoven, the Netherlands. It was squatted in 1971 and has grown into one of the largest pop venues in the country, hosting rock, pop and techno events. The current Effenaar consists of two music halls after being renovated between 2002 and 2005. The large hall has an audience capacity of 1300, is intended for use by larger bands and acts and is considerably larger than the original hall. The small hall has a capacity of 400 (smaller than the old Effenaar) and is used for smaller and/or regional bands.

The old Effenaar venue hosted many large (national and international) acts throughout its existence, including Bauhaus, Red Hot Chili Peppers and the Sex Pistols. In 2011, the venue celebrated its 40th anniversary with concerts, a book and an exhibition.

== History ==
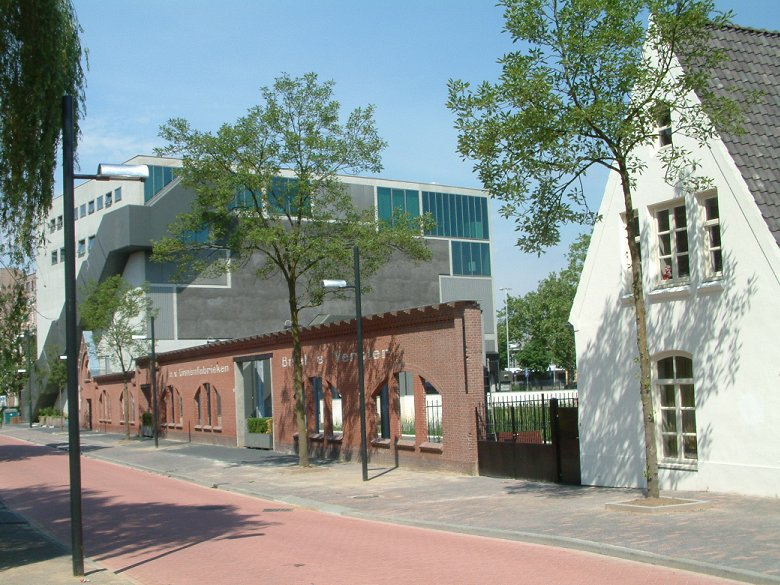
The Effenaar, housed in a former linen factory

Dommelstraat 2 was the Van den Briel & Verster linen factory until 1964. Eindhoven council then bought the property.

The Effenaar was squatted by young people in 1970 under the name 'Open Jongerencentrum Para+'. They set up a music venue and the building quickly became known as the drug centre for the region. The venue was closed down and began again six months later as the Effenaar.

== Venue ==
The Effenaar hosted evenings where young people could express their discontent with society, politics and their parents. After five years the group decided to allow the Effenaar to grow more in the direction of cultural events, but still with criticism of society as the main focus. With time, the group abandoned more and more of its societal role and put more time and effort into putting on musical events. The focus shifted more and more to cultural activities. In 1986 the decision was made to widen the target audience and to make the character of the place more open and welcoming. This attracted a very diverse audience and allowed the Effenaar to grow into the top of the Dutch pop circuit.

Many rock and pop bands have played at the venue, for example A Certain Ratio, Bauhaus, The Fall, Joy Division, Orchestral Manoeuvres in the Dark, Ramones, Red Hot Chili Peppers and the Sex Pistols. In the 1990s, Saskia Slegers started to put on techno parties at the Effenaar. Her label Djax-Up-Beats and its subsidiaries played a large role in introducing Chicago-style techno to the Netherlands and promoting it around the world.

The council decided to renovate the building in 2002, with MVRDV as architects. The new venue officially opened in 2005, with two halls (with the capacity for 1300 and 400 visitors, respectively). Whereas previously the venue hosted 100,000 attendees in a year, it could now host 143,000. The works cost over 14 million euros.

During the Pop Music Gala of May 2009 (in Amsterdam), Effenaar director Marijke Appelboom was named "best pop venue director of the Netherlands". She received the IJzeren Podiumbeest Award for her achievement.

In 2019, the Effenaar decided to use 5G technology in order to provide the best streaming service for virtual attendees of concerts.

== 40th Anniversary ==
The Effenaar celebrated the 40 year anniversary of its foundation in 2011 with a series of concerts. Some of the musical memories of the past 40 years were collected into a book called Memories Can't Wait, the title being a quotation from a Talking Heads song. It was written and composed by journalist and former Effenaar employee Niels Guns, and designed by Fabrique, the company that also designed the Effenaar's house style. It won a bronze European Design award.

The book also contains personal stories of bandmembers who reflect on their experiences with the Effenaar. Roughly 50 artists, including members of Ramones, The Cure, The Birthday Party, Joy Division, Sonic Youth, Pixies, Butthole Surfers, The Jesus Lizard, Motorpsycho, Babyshambles and Elbow tell anecdotally about their shows in the Effenaar and thereby indicate the musical era in which they travelled to Eindhoven.

Previously an exhibition of posters from 1970s gigs at the Effenaar had been held from 2015 to 2016 at the old courthouse in Eindhoven.
