= Rotown =

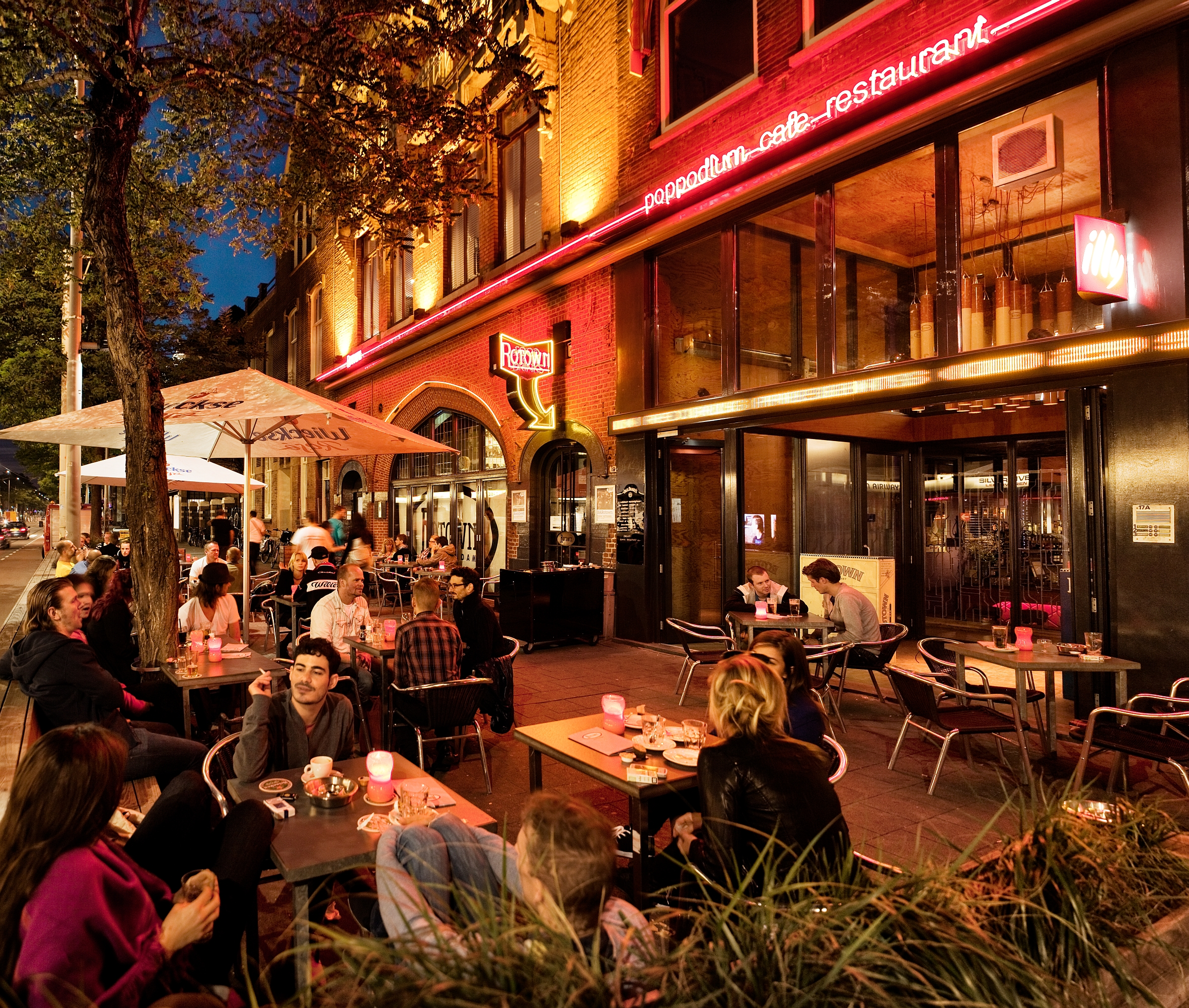
- Rotown entrance

- Location within Netherlands Location within Europe

General information
- Status: music venue
- Location: Rotterdam, Nieuwe Binnenweg 19, Netherlands
- Coordinates: 51°55′01″N 4°28′18″E
- Opened: 30 April 1987

Website
- www.rotown.nl

Rotown is a music venue and a bar-restaurant in Rotterdam, Netherlands. It is located close to the city centre, on the Nieuwe Binnenweg.

It is housed in a former Chinese restaurant and has been, although a small one, Rotterdam's main venue for rock and indie music concerts after the demise of Nighttown.
