= 013 =

Music venue in Tilburg, the Netherlands

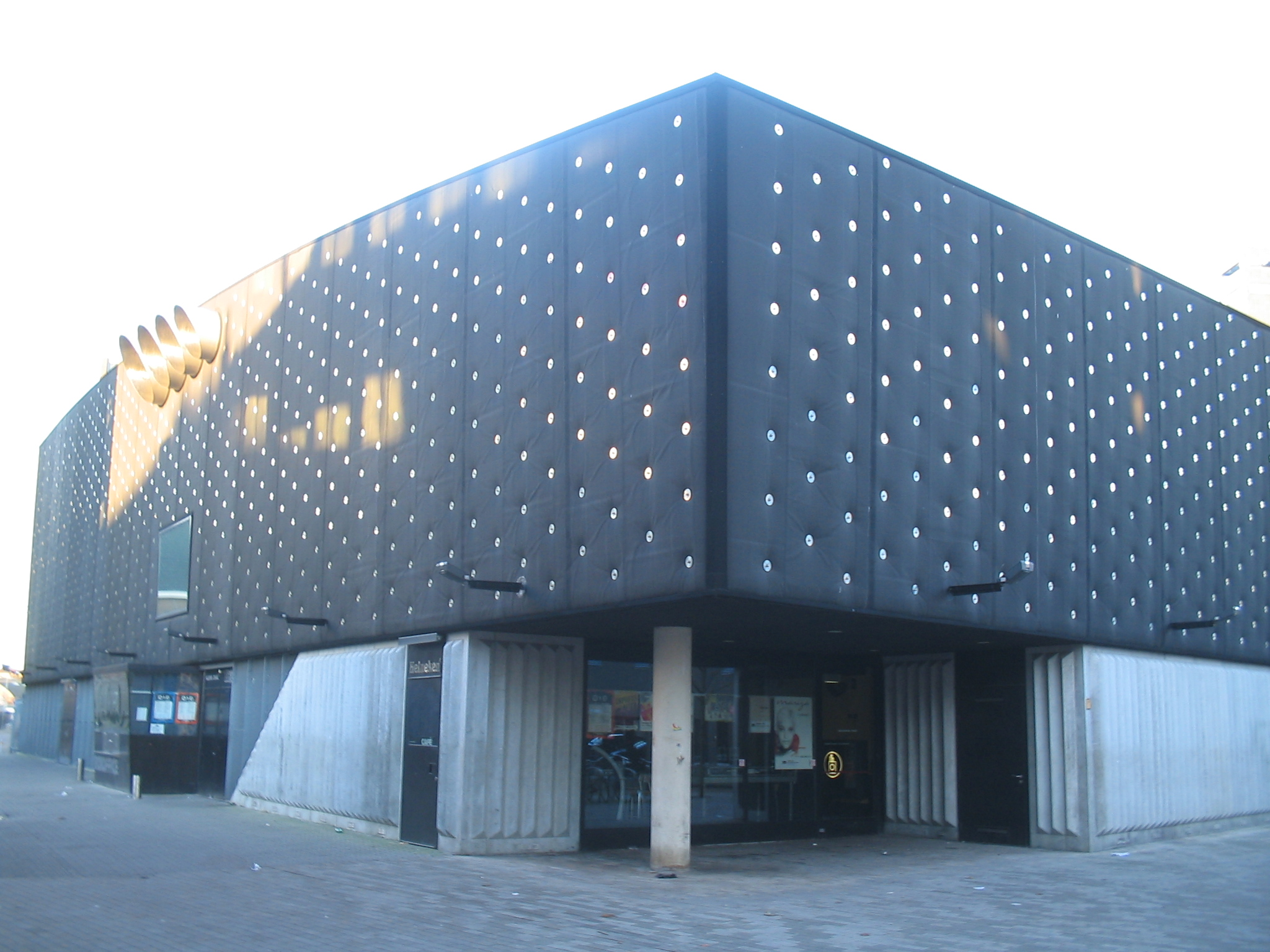
- 013 in Tilburg

- Location in North Brabant
- Location: Tilburg, the Netherlands
- Coordinates: 51°33′31″N 5°05′35″E
- Capacity: 3000
- Type: Music venue

Construction
- Opened: 1998

013 is a music venue in Tilburg, the Netherlands. The venue opened in 1998 and replaced the Noorderligt, the Bat Cave and the MuziekKantenWinkel. 013 is the largest popular music venue in the southern Netherlands.

There are two concert halls of which the "Main Stage" (formerly Jupiler Zaal and Dommelsch Zaal) is the largest, with a capacity of 3,000 attendees. The smaller stage has a capacity of 700 attendees.

The name of the venue is based on the area code of Tilburg.

In August 2011, the director of 013, Guus van Hove, died of heat exposure in the Californian Joshua Tree National Park, together with his girlfriend. Van Hove had told friends he planned to visit the site of U2's The Joshua Tree album cover, which they falsely assumed to be near the location where they died.

013 hosts the bigger acts at the annual music festivals Roadburn (stoner rock festival), Incubate Festival and Neurotic Deathfest. Also, it was a home for Ayreon's live shows in 2017, 2019, and 2023, which gathered more than 9000 people from more than 50 countries.
