= Eurosonic Noorderslag =

Annual music festival in Groningen, Netherlands

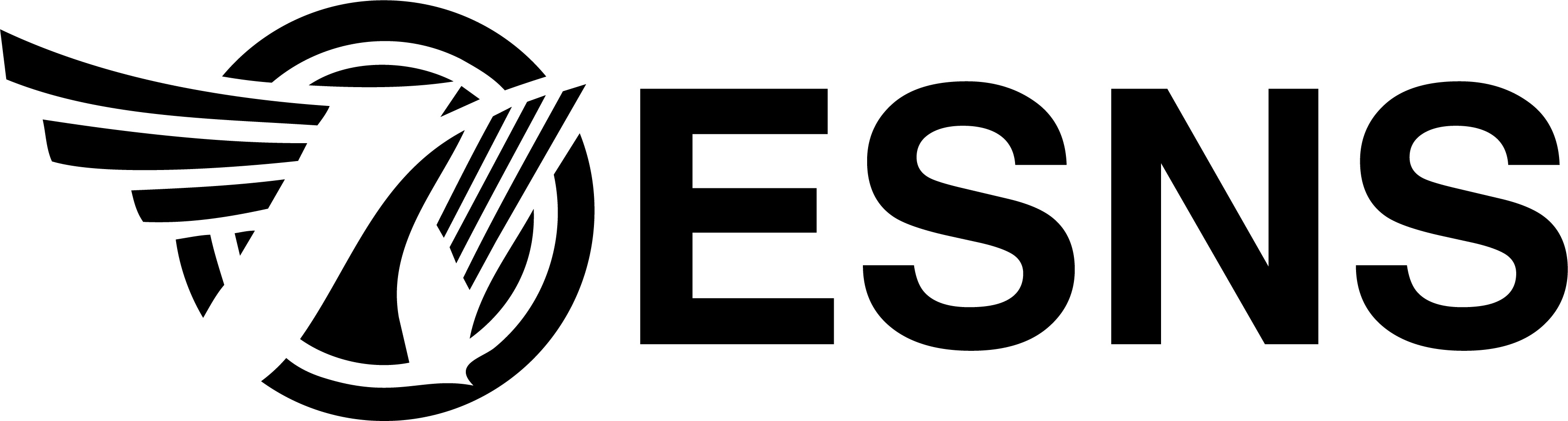

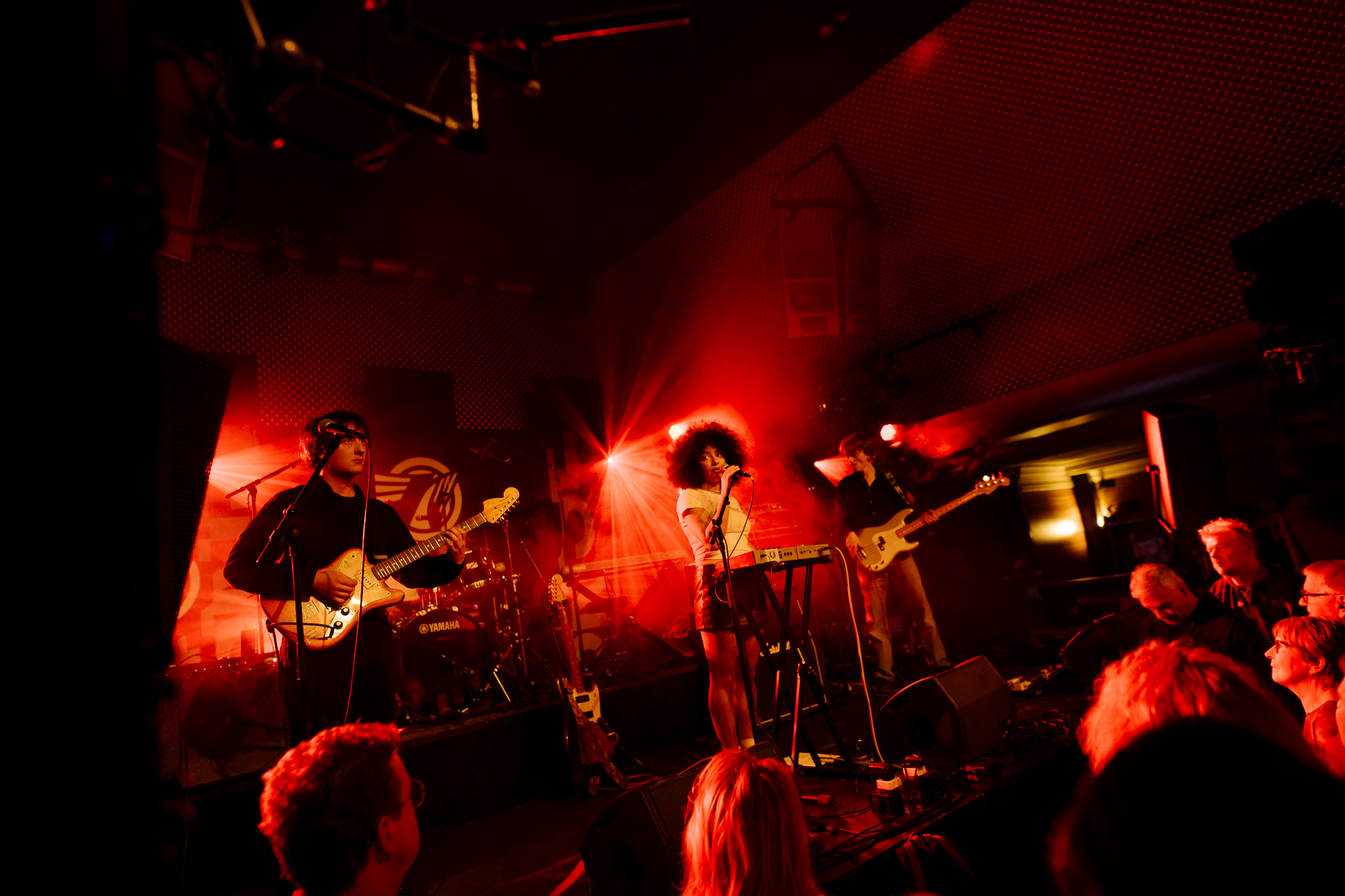
- English Teacher performing at ESNS24, photographed by Stef van Oosterhout
- Status: active
- Genre: Showcase festival and conference
- Dates: January (dates vary)
- Frequency: Annual
- Location: Groningen
- Coordinates: 53°12′58.73″N 6°34′3.95″E
- Years active: 40
- Inaugurated: 4 January 1986
- Most recent: 17 January 2024 – 20 January 2024
- Next event: 15 January 2025 – 18 January 2025
- Attendance: Total: 42,789 (2019); Conference: 4,135 (2019)
- Organizer: Noorderslag Foundation (stichting Noorderslag)
- Website: esns.nl

ESNS (Eurosonic Noorderslag) is an annual four-day music showcase festival and conference held in January in Groningen, the Netherlands. The first three days of the festival (Eurosonic) feature artists from all over Europe, the last day of the festival (Noorderslag) features only Dutch artists. The conference is held during all four days of the event. Several awards are presented during Eurosonic Noorderslag: the Music Moves Europe Talent Awards, the European Festivals Awards, the Buma Cultuur Pop Award (Popprijs), the Pop Media Award (Pop Media Prijs), The Feather (De Veer), the "Iron Venue and Festival Animals" (IJzeren Podiumdieren) and the Buma Music Meets Tech Award.

== Eurosonic ==
The first three days of the event (Wednesday, Thursday and Friday) are referred to as the Eurosonic festival. Eurosonic takes place in multiple venues across the center of Groningen. It features artists from all over Europe. Every year the organization chooses one country as focus country highlighted during the festival.

== Noorderslag ==
The last day of the event (Saturday) is referred to as the Noorderslag festival and takes place in De Oosterpoort. It features only Dutch artists and includes the announcement of the winner of the Buma Cultuur Pop Award. Since 2008 the festival is broadcast live by the NOS (Dutch Broadcasting Foundation).

== Eurosonic Air ==
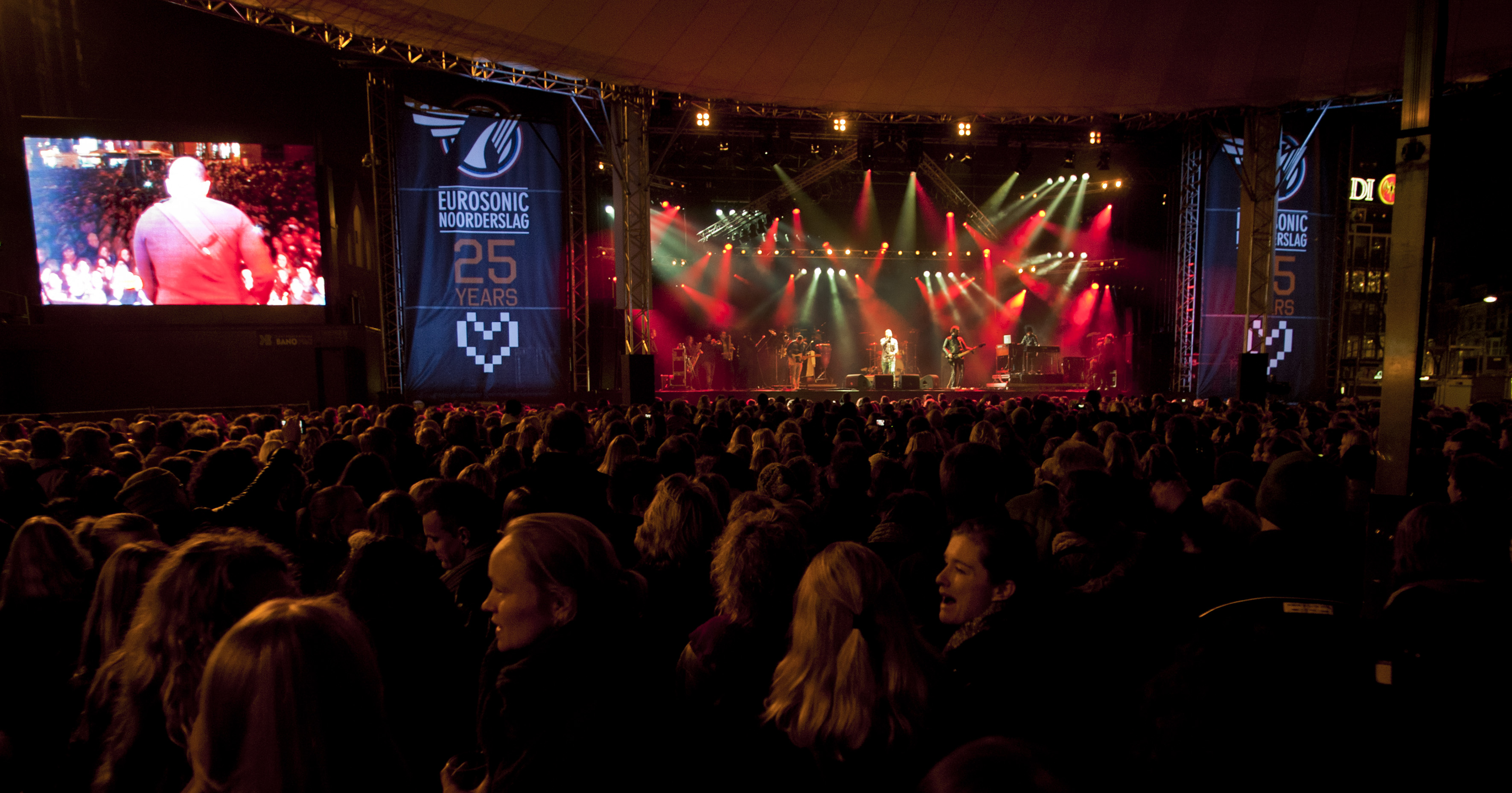
Eurosonic Air in 2011

Started in 2011 to celebrate the 25 anniversary of Eurosonic Noorderslag, Eurosonic Air is a free open air festival hosted on a stage on the main square (Grote Markt) of Groningen. A large "umbrella" or tent is placed in front of the stage which determines the look of the square during the festival.

== Conference ==
During all four days of the event a conference is held. The conference features several specialized programs such as EPIC (the European Production Innovation Conference) and Buma Music Meets Tech. During the conference a meeting is held for the European Talent Exchange Program (ETEP), which was founded by Eurosonic Noorderslag.

== Grunnsonic and unofficial events during Eurosonic Noorderslag ==
In 2007 Grunnsonic was added to Eurosonic Noorderslag as a third festival. It offers artists from Groningen the chance to showcase in front of an international audience. Though the performances taking place under the name Grunnsonic are listed on the Eurosonic Noorderslag website and the participating artists are considered to be participating in Eurosonic Noorderslag, a Eurosonic Noorderslag ticket or conference registration is not required to visit Grunnsonic performances.

With the exception of Eurosonic Air and Grunnsonic, the performances of Eurosonic Noorderslag can only be visited by people who have bought tickets or are participating in the conference. Simultaneously free concerts are organized all over the city centre in pubs, bar dancings, art galleries.

== History ==
On 4 January 1986 the "Holland-Belgium festival" was organized in De Oosterpoort in Groningen as a battle between Dutch and Belgian pop bands. Though not yet carrying the name, this is considered the first edition of Noorderslag. Following the success of this event in 1987 the festival is organized again, now using the name "Noorderslag". The event is now advertised as a battle between bands from the northern Netherlands and the rest of the country. In 1988 the third edition is promoted as a regular festival, there is no longer a battle element. In November 1988 the EBU-festival "Eurorock", a three-day festival with European bands is held in De Oosterpoort. As a consequence, Noorderslag is not organized in January 1989.

In 1990 a seminar for music industry professionals is added to the festival, making the event notable on a national level. 1992 is the first year the winner of the Buma Cultuur Pop Award is announced at Noorderslag. In 1993 the festival "Noorderslagting" is organized so bands from Groningen can showcase themselves on the Friday before Noorderslag to the music industry professionals who are already in the city to visit Noorderslag. In 1996 the "Euroslagt" festival is renamed to "Euroslag", which is subsequently renamed to "Eurosonic" in 1999. It drew about 1800 visitors and featured artists from twelve countries playing across ten venues. Eurosonic 2000 sells 2200 tickets in presale, selling out the event. It features fifty acts in thirteen venues (fifteen stages) and is bigger than any previous edition. Eurosonic 2001 grows to 90 artists playing across 14 venues, creating a total of 21 stages. Eurosonic 2002 featured over 100 artists across 19 venues with a total of 25 stages.

In 2007 the first edition of "Grunnsonic" is organized, the festival is added to Eurosonic and Noorderslag to allow acts from Groningen to show themselves to a bigger audience. In 2009 the sixth edition of the European Border Breakers Awards is held at De Oosterpoort on the opening night of Eurosonic Noorderslag. Also, the name of the event is officially changed to "Eurosonic Noorderslag".

In 2011 the first edition of "Eurosonic Air" is held, to celebrate the 25th anniversary of the event. 2011 was also the first year the event lasted four days, Eurosonic now starting on Wednesday.

Tickets for the 2012 festival were sold out within ten minutes. During the 2012 festival Buma/Stemra, theFactor.e and Eurosonic Noorderslag organized the fifth edition of the annual Interactive Awards.

Between 2008 and 2011 the Lex van Rossen Award was presented at Eurosonic Noorderslag.

The 2013 edition drew 35,000 visitors.

Tickets for the 2014 festival sold out within hours, tickets for Noorderslag selling out within the first minutes of the sale. The edition saw a record number of 38,500 visitors.

In December 2015 IMPALA awarded Eurosonic Noorderslag the "outstanding contribution to independent music" award.

The 2015 edition of the event drew a total of 41,200 visitors of 42 nationalities and featured 345 acts. The 2015 conference had 3,900 participants.

In 2016 Eurosonic Air will take place in a tent for the first time, to make the atmosphere closer to the rest of the festival. The tent will have a capacity of 3,000 people and include balconies. During Eurosonic Air, the North Netherlands Symphony Orchestra (Noord Nederlands Orkest) will play the program "What's on David Bowie's playlist?", inspired by the "David Bowie is" exhibition at the Groninger Museum. Between the announcement of the performance and the performance itself David Bowie died of cancer at age 69. The attendance for the 2016 edition was reported as 42,100. 4,100 professionals participated in the conference.

== Editions ==
Edition	Year	Dates	Attendance	Total number of acts	Focus country	Notable acts at Noorderslag	Notable acts at Eurosonic (including Eurosonic Air)
1	1986	4 January	1500	19	N/A	Claw Boys Claw, Tröckener Kecks	N/A
2	1987	3 January	2000	21	N/A	Claw Boys Claw, Slagerij van Kampen	N/A
3	1988	9 January	2150	24 or 25	N/A	De Dijk, Extince, The Nits, Tröckener Kecks, Urban Dance Squad	N/A
4	1990	6 January	2500	30	N/A	The Ex, Loïs Lane, Pigmeat, Urban Dance Squad, De Boegies, D.A.M.N., L Rock DeeJay Bass, The Serenes, LUL, Sjako!, The Nozems, Batmobile, De Artsen	N/A
5	1991	5 January	2800	33 or 34	N/A	Claw Boys Claw, Jan Rot, Raggende Manne, Tröckener Kecks, The Serenes	N/A
6	1992	4 January	about 3000	29, 'over 30' or 35	N/A	Daryll-Ann, The Ex, Rowwen Hèze	N/A
7	1993	9 January	about 4000 or about 3500	28 or 30	N/A	Bettie Serveert, Claw Boys Claw, Gorefest, Loïs Lane, The Gathering, The Scene	N/A
8	1994	8 January	over or about 4000	33	N/A	Bettie Serveert, Daryll-Ann, De Kift	N/A
9	1995	6–7 January	about 4000 (Noorderslag)	35 (Noorderslag) + 18 (Euroslagt)	N/A	Claw Boys Claw, Gorefest, Pigmeat, Van Dik Hout	Non-local acts at Euroslagt: Jet Black Joe (IS), Kinky Boot Beast (DK), Perverted By Desire (BE), Skintrade (SE), Têtes Raides (FR), Hamid Baroudi (DE), Easy Meat (NL), Shine (NL), The Pilgrims (NL), 18th Dye (DE), The Notwist (DE)
10	1996	5–6 January	over or about 3500 (Noorderslag)	35 (Noorderslag) + 17 (Euroslag)	N/A	De Heideroosjes, Extince, The Gathering, Osdorp Posse, Reboelje, Skik, Van Dik Hout	Acts at Euroslag: De Jazzpolitie (NL), Tiedo en Plan K. (NL)
11	1997	8–9 January	about 4000 (Noorderslag)	'3 dozen' (Noorderslag) + about 25 (Euroslag)	N/A	De Kift, The Gathering, Johan, Neuk!, Skik, Total Touch	
12	1998	9–10 January	over 4000 (Noorderslag)	38 (Noorderslag)	N/A	Anouk, Dj Ruffneck, Skik, Travoltas, Within Temptation, Marco Borsato	An Pierlé (BE), Meindert Talma & The Negroes (NL), Is Ook Schitterend (NL)
13	1999	8–9 January	about 1800 (EuroSonic)	37 (Noorderslag) + 47 (Eurosonic)	N/A	Band Zonder Banaan, The Gathering, Ilse DeLange, Krezip, Postmen, Racoon	Gluecifer (NO), Janez Detd. (BE), Meindert Talma & The Negroes (NL), Ozark Henry (BE), Slagerij van Kampen (NL)
14	2000	7–8 January	2200 (EuroSonic)	42 (Noorderslag) + 50 (Eurosonic)	N/A	Abel, Brainpower, Daryll-Ann, Ellen Ten Damme, Junkie XL, Krezip, Meindert Talma & The Negroes, Spookrijders, Postmen, Kane	Daryll-Ann (NL), Def Rhymz (NL), Henk Westbroek (NL), Is Ook Schitterend (NL), Lawn (NL)
15	2001	5–6 January	4500 (Eurosonic)	37 (Noorderslag) + 90 or 75 or 73 (Eurosonic)	N/A	BeefThe Black Box Revelation, Dreadlock Pussy, Green Lizard, Luie Hond, Racoon, Re-Play, Twarres, Within Temptation, The Wounded, Zuco 103	Das Pop (BE), Hooverphonic (BE), Kings of Convenience (NO), Meindert Talma (NL), Novastar (BE)
16	2002	11–12 January	4000 or 5000 (Eurosonic) + 5000 (Noorderslag)	50 (Noorderslag) + over or about 100 (Eurosonic)	N/A	16 Down, After Forever, Birgit, Blof, De Kift, Di-rect, Johan, Jovink en de Voederbietels, Luie Hond, Peter Pan Speedrock, Relax, The Sheer, Stuurbaard Bakkebaard	16 Down (NL), Aereogramme (GB), Alamo Race Track (NL), Daryll-Ann (NL), Di-rect (NL), Krezip (NL), Lawn (NL), Millionaire (BE), Rapalje (NL), Saybia (DK), Twarres (NL)
17	2003	9–11 January		45 (Noorderslag) +20 (Thursday) + almost 100 (Friday) (Eurosonic)	N/A	Alamo Race Track, Anouk, C-Mon & Kypski, E-Life, Face Tomorrow, Krezip, Raymzter, Spinvis, Voicst	An Pierlé (BE), Audiotransparent (NL), Bettie Serveert (NL), Caesar (NL), De Heideroosjes (NL), C-Mon & Kypski (NL), Laidback Luke (NL), Dreadlock Pussy (NL), Erlend Øye (NO), Johan (NL), Kaizers Orchestra (NO), Mando Diao (SE), Ska-P(ES), The Apers(NL), The Libertines (GB), The Raveonettes (DK), The Shavers (NL)
18	2004	8–10 January	5000 (Noorderslag) + 10,000 (Eurosonic)	almost 50 (Noorderslag) +over 100 or 110 (Eurosonic)	N/A	ADHD - Alamo Race Track - Audiotransparent - Di-rect - Chuckie - Don Diablo - Epica - The Green Hornet - Intwine - K-Liber 4 Life - Lawn - Moss - Opgezwolle - Peter Pan Speedrock - RMXCRW - Meindert Talma - Tasha's World - This Beautiful Mess - Treble - Voicst - We vs. Death - Within Temptation - Wyatt - zZz	Absynthe Minded (BE), After Forever (NL), Die Apokalyptischen Reiter (DE), Gabriel Rios (BE), Alamo Race Track (NL), Johan (Nl), Stijn (BE), The Subways (GB), Triggerfinger (BE), Franz Ferdinand (GB)
19	2005	13–15 January	5000 (Noorderslag), 14,200 (total)	50 (Noorderslag) + 50 (Thursday) + 70 (Friday) (Eurosonic)	France	Asrai - Alain Clark & Band - Autumn - Beef! - Brace - DJ Dana - DJ Promo - Face Tomorrow - Gem - K-Liber 4 Life - Lange Frans & Baas B ft. D-Men - Marike Jager - Mondo Leone - Seymour Bits - The Sheer - Solo - Textures - THC - Wende Snijders	Hal (IE), Gabriel Rios (BE), Bettie Serveert (NL), Têtes Raides (FR), Emilie Simon (FR)
20	2006	12–14 January	15,000 (total)	58 (Noorderslag) + 140 (Eurosonic)	Germany	About - André Manuel - At the close of every day - Behave - Bong-Ra - Brace - Charlie Dée - De Jeugd van Tegenwoordig - El Pino and the Volunteers - Epica - GEM - Ghetto Flow - Hind - Jawat! - Kraak & Smaak - Marjolijn - Meindert Talma & the Negroes - Mondo Leone - Opgezwolle - The Opposites - Racoon - San Andreas - Spinvis - Stevie Ann - Tim (VSOP) - Typhoon - Ziggi Recado - zZz	Animal Alpha (NO), The Answer (GB), Alamo Race Track (NL), The Chalets (IE), Corvus Corax (DE), Dungen (SE), GEM (NL), Infadels (GB), Nouvelle Vague (FR), Ojos de Brujo (ES), Pete Philly & Perquisite (NL), Wir Sind Helden (DE)
21	2007	11–13 January	5500 (Noorderslag) 15,050 (total)	51 (Noorderslag), 'over 200' (total)	Italy	a balladeer - Alamo Race Track - Aux Raus- Boris - C-mon & Kypski - Coparck - Delain - Dennis - Dicecream - Do-The-Undo - El Pino and the Volunteers - Hospital Bombers - Ilse DeLange - Jiggy Djé - Johan - Kempi - Kraak & Smaak - Kubus - Lucky Fonz III - Luie Hond - Noisia - Postman - Room Eleven - Roosbeef - U-Niq - Winne	About (NL), Air Traffic (GB), The Answer (GB), Das Pop (BE), Datarock (NO), Digitalism (DE), Enter Shikari (GB), Julie Feeney (IE), Gabriel Ríos (BE), The Girls (GB), Goose (BE), Green Hornet (NL), Humanzi (IE), Instil (NL), The Magic Numbers (GB), Ozark Henry (BE), Textures (NL), Van Velzen (NL), zZz (NL)
22	2008	10–12 January	15,050 (total)		Sweden	Alain Clark - Aux Raus - Agua de Annique - C-mon & Kypski - Claw Boys Claw - The Girls - Hospital Bombers - Leaf - Lucky Fonz III - The Opposites - Pete Philly & Perquisite - Room Eleven - Stevie Ann - Voicst - Wouter Hamel - All Missing Pieces	Sarah Bettens (BE), Cathy Davey (IE), The Hoosiers (GB), Hooverphonic (BE), I'm from Barcelona (SE), June in December (NL), Lykke Li (SE), Republic of Loose (IE), Stone Gods (GB), Pioneers of love (NL), Andi Almqvist (SE)
23	2009	15–17 January			Belgium	A Brand - Alain Clark - Balthazar - De Kift - Ghinzu - King Jack - Lucky Fonz III - Marit Larsen - Milow - Moke - Polarkreis 18 - Room Eleven - Selah Sue - Shameboy - The Black Box Revelation - The Rakes - The Subs - Triggerfinger - Turbo - White Lies - Zita Swoon - zZz	Wallis Bird (IE), The Coronas (IE), Fight Like Apes (IE), Rita Redshoes (PT), The Legendary Tigerman (PT), Buraka Som Sistema (PT), Pioneers of love (NL), Novastar (BE)
24	2010	14–16 January	18,000 (deduced)		Norway	Caro Emerald - Bettie Serveert - Daily Bread - De Staat - DeWolff - Drive Like Maria - Di-rect - Elske DeWall - Go Back to the Zoo - Janne Schra - Knalpot - Moss - Moke- Promo - Rigby - Shaking Godspeed- The Madd - The Mad Trist - Wende - Zwart Licht	And So I Watch You From Afar (IE), Delorentos (IE), Imelda May (IE), Villagers (IE), Kaizers Orchestra (NO), Love Amongst Ruin (GB)
25	2011	12–15 January	33,000	292	Netherlands	A Silent Express - Beans and Fatback - Blaudzun - Caro Emerald - Chef' Special - Dazzled Kid - Death Letters - DeWolff - Eefje - Go Back to the Zoo - Handsome Poets - Happy Camper - Kensington - Kleine Viezerik - Krach - Lola Kite - Make Believe - Moss - Only Seven Left - Palmbomen - Roos Jonker - Schradinova - Sef - Tim Knol	Selah Sue (BE), Balthazar (BE), Crystal Fighters (ES), My Little Cheap Dictaphone (BE), Ginga (AT), James Blake (GB) Kvety (CZ), Vinnie Who (DK), Ben l'Oncle Soul (FR), White Lies (GB), LaBrassBanda (DE), Sean Riley & The Slowriders (PT), Junip (SE), Krach (NL)
26	2012	11–14 January	33,000 (tickets sold: 17,000)	293	Ireland	A Polaroid View - Awkward I - Bart Constant - Blaudzun - Boemklatsch Equalizer - Bomb Diggy Crew - Bombay Show Pig - Bruut! - Case Mayfield - Chagall - Chef'Special Deluxe - Coevorduh - Concrete Sneaker - De Avonduren - Dio - Dope D.O.D. - ED - Eefje de Visser - Fellow - Gerhardt - Gers Pardoel - Henzel & Disco Nova -Hospital Bombers - Jah6 - Jameszoo - Kees van Hondt - Kraantje Pappie - Kris Berry - Krystl - Krampfhaft - Kypski & Matangi Quartet - Le Le - Lefties Soul Connection - Light Light - Luik - Mr. Polska ft. Nouveau Riche - Nobody Beats The Drum 333" - Pioneers of Love - Ralph de Jongh & The Crazy Hearts - Rats on Rafts - Roosbeef - Spinvis - The Kik - The Very Next - Thomas Azier - Tom Trago - Vanderbuyst - Wiwa & Friends -Wolfendale - Wooden Saints - Yori Swart	DVA (CZ), Bitches with Wolves, Cashier no9, Fionn Regan, We Cut Corners, Emmet Tinley, Foy Vance, Funeral Suits, God Is an Astronaut, Hello Moon, James Vincent McMorrow, Jape, LaFaro, Lisa Hannigan, Iceage, Yuri Landman Ensemble (NL), Luik (NL), Squarehead, The Cast of Cheers, The Minutes, Pioneers of love (NL), Thread Pulls (IR), Toby Karr, Wallis Bird, Jessie Ware
27	2013	9–12 January	35,000	304	Finland		Bastille(GB), Jake Bugg(GB)
28	2014	15–18 January	38,500	337	Austria	Sofie Winterson	Hozier(IE)
29	2015	14–17 January	41,200	345	Iceland	Bade, The Mysterons	Mélanie de Biasio (BE), Acid Arab (FR), Rimer London (NL), Acid Baby Jesus (GR)
30	2016	13–16 January	42,100	about 350	Central and Eastern Europe	Tamarin Desert, Jo Goes Hunting, CUT_, Terzij De Horde, Naive Set, All the King's Daughters, Amber Arcades, Blue Crime, Bökkers, Dazzled Sticks, Death Alley, Drummakid, Echo Movis, Gallowstreet, Haty Haty, Iguana Death Cult, Max Meser, Midas, My Baby, Sef, St Tropez, Tears & Marble, The Homesick, Thijs Boontjes Dans- en Showorkest, Umeme Afrorave.	Jett Rebel (NL), Bewilder (NL), The Common Linnets (NL), Typhoon (NL), Sven Hammond (NL), Weval (NL), Applescal (NL), De Staat (NL), Afterpartees (NL), Álvaro Soler (ES), AURORA (NO), Douglas Firs (BE), Filous (AT), Forever Pavot (FR), Hydrogen Sea (BE), James Hersey (AT), Lea Porcelain (DE), Oscar and the Wolf (BE), Seinabo Sey (SE), SOAK (IE), John Coffey (NL), Dua Lipa (UK)
31	2017	11–14 January	40,300	382	Portugal		Era Istrefi (AL), Anne-Marie (GB), Rohey (NO), Betsy (GB), Thomas Azier (NL), Jett Rebel (NL), Palace Winter (DK)
32	2018	17–20 January			Denmark		
33	2019	16–19 January	42,789				
34	2020	15–18 January					Sensible Soccers (PT)
35	2021	13–16 January	Online edition	169	Europe	Froukje, Hang Youth, Kevin, Rolf Sanchez, Son Mieux, Sophie Straat, Sor, Temple Fang, Yade Lauren.	Adwaith, Alyona Alyona, Benny Sings, Blanks, Chibi Ichigo, Denise Chaila, Eefje de Visser, Enola Gay, James BKS, Jockstrap, Joe & the Shitboys, Ladaniva, Lava La Rue, Lous and the Yakuza, Meskerem Mees, NewDad, Personal Trainer, Queen's Pleasure, RIMON, SKAAR, Yellowstraps, YĪN YĪN.
36	2022	19–22 January	Online edition	259	Spain	Antoon, Baby's Berserk, Bente, Bnnyhunna, Cho, Cloudsurfers, Don Melody Club, Faske, Flemming, Froukje, Goldband, Hang Youth, Karsu, Loupe, Meau, MEROL, Nonchalance, S10, Sera, Son Mieux, Sophie Straat, Tramhaus, WIES, Wodan Boys, Yade Lauren	Alina Pash, Amelie Siba, Ash Olsen, Beharie, Berwyn, Blanks, Bruno Pernadas, Cian Ducrot, Clarissa Connelly, Conchúr White, Coucou Chloe, Cyan Kicks, Daði Freyr, Duo Ruut, Florence Arman, Francis of Delirium, Go_A, Hermanos Gutiérrez, Hiigo, John Francis Flynn, Jungle By Night, Mezerg, Mimi Webb, Pitou, Priya Ragu, Remme, Smash Into Pieces, Sparkling, Sprints, The Haunted Youth, The Vices, Tinlicker, Wet Leg, Yard Act.
37	2023	18–21 January		322	Spain	Babs, Bente, Brunzyn, Bumble B. Boy, Claude, De Toegift, Dopebwoy, Elephant, FIEP, gladde paling, Gotu Jim, Hang Youth, Joost, Katnuf, Marathon, Natte Visstick, Nobu, Nonchelange, néomí, Personal Trainer, Pitou, S10, Siggy & D1ns, Son Mieux, sor, The Jordan, Wodan Boys, Zoë Tauran	Aime Simone, Alina Pash, Amelie Siba, Arny Margret, Beharie, Benwal, Blanks, Bnnyhunna, Bolis Pupul, Bulgarian Cartrader, CIEL, Cloudsurfers, Deki Alem, doppelfinger, Eee Gee, Fran Vasilić, freekind., Gallus, Goldkimono, Gurriers, Hannes, Heartworms, Katie Gregson-MacLeod, Kids Return, MEROL, Naaz, Ramkot, Robin Kester, Sans Soucis, Sprints, The Haunted Youth, The Mary Wallopers, The Scratch, Tramhaus, UCHE YARA, waterbaby.
38	2024	17–20 January		300	Poland	Adriaan Persons, Anna-Rose Clayton, Claude, Dorpsstraat 3, Droom Dit, Elmer, Froukje, Ploegendienst, Primaat, Ritse, Roxeanne Hazes, Roxy Dekker, Sef, Sophie Straat.	Amber Broos, Annie Taylor, Artificialice, Berry Galazka, Betterov, BLUAI, Bokoesam, Chalk, ClockClock, CMAT, Eddington Again, Elmiene English Teacher, Fat Dog, Fran Vasilić, Graham Lake, Jann, Joker Out, Joost, Kalush Orchestra, KARSU, Kingfishr, Lynks, Master Peace, Meltheads, Might Delete Later, No Guidnce, néomí, Ona Mafalda, Pearly Drops, Picture Parlour, Pommelien Thijs, Porcelain id, PRISMA, Sarah Julia, Sekou, Tramhaus, yunè pinku, Zaho De Sagazan.
39	2025	15-18 January					

== See also ==
- Ireland in the Eurosonic Festival
