= List of web awards =

This list of web awards is an index to articles on notable awards related to the internet.

== List ==
Award	Sponsor	Awarded for	Website / period
American Web Awards	JDKRUEGER&CO	Online stores and web agencies	americanwebawards.com
Africa Digital Awards	ThirdEye Media	Digital creators and developers	africadigitalawards.com
ArsDigita Prize	ArsDigita	Young people who created useful, educational, and collaborative non-commercial Web sites	1999 to 2001
AIMIA (AMY) Awards	Australian Interactive Media Industry Association	Best digital work in Australia	1992 to 2015; since then, various other awards by its successor, Digital + Technology Collective (part of ADMA)
Awwwards	Awwwards Online SL	Best of innovative web design	www.awwwards.com
Astonishing Awards	Astonishing Awards	Honouring The Very Best of Web Design and Web Technologies	www.astonishingawards.com
Best of the Web awards	Museums and the Web	Best museum work on the web	www.museumsandtheweb.com/best
TopCSSGallery	Site of The Awards - CSS Web Design	Best Web Design Gallery that support and provide web design awards to top website designers.	2017 https://www.topcssgallery.com/
Black Weblog Awards		Bloggers of African-American descent for their contributions in blogging, video blogging, and podcasting	to 2016
The BOBs (weblog award)	Deutsche Welle	Freedom of information and the press around the world	thebobs.com/english/
Canadian Screen Awards	Academy of Canadian Cinema & Television	Excellence in Canadian film, English-language television, and digital media productions	www.academy.ca/awards/
Clickies	Clickburg	Dutch webcomics awards ceremony	2005 to 2010
Cool Site of the Day	Mike Corso		www.coolsiteoftheday.com
Crunchies	TechCrunch	Silicon Valley companies and venture capitalists	2007 to 2017
EPpy Awards	Editor & Publisher	Newspapers and other media outlets	www.editorandpublisher.com/eppy-winners-2019/
ESLAND Awards	TheGrefg	Spanish-speaking streaming community	2022 - present www.premiosesland.com
GenZ Awards	Divinity / Mediaset España	Best in Spanish social media personalities	2023 - present www.divinity.es/genzawards//
IAWTV Awards	Caucus of Producers, Writers & Directors	Honors web series creators and talent	www.caucus.org/members/iawtv.html
iBest Award (Prêmio iBest)		Best in Brazilian Digital Media	1995 to 2008, and then 2020 - premioibest.com
IDFA DocLab Award for Digital Storytelling	International Documentary Film Festival Amsterdam	Digital documentary	www.idfa.nl/en/
IHeartRadio Podcast Awards	IHeartRadio	Digital podcasts	www.iheart.com/podcast-awards/
IReel Awards	Network18 Group	Excellence of Indian web series	www.news18.com/i-reel-awards/
Indie Series Awards	We Love Soaps	Best in independently produced, scripted entertainment created for the web	www.indieseriesawards.com
Interactive Awards	Eurosonic Noorderslag	Artists, bands and music organizations that use the internet in an inventive way to market (their) music	
International Digital Emmy Awards	International Academy of Television Arts and Sciences	Excellence in content created and designed for viewer interaction and/or delivery on a digital platform	www.iemmys.tv
James Jessiman Memorial Award	LDraw.org	Contribution to the furthering of LDraw, the DAT format, and James' memory	ldraw.org / 2001, 2003 - 2009, 2011 - present (until 2005 also in offline)
MTV Video Music Award for Best Artist Website	MTV	Best Artist Website	Only in 1999
NII Awards	National Information Infrastructure	Excellence and innovation in use of the Internet	1995 to 1999
Net Awards	Net (magazine)	Outstanding achievements in web development	To 2015 thenetawards.com
Peabody Award	Henry W. Grady College of Journalism and Mass Communication	Most powerful, enlightening, and invigorating stories in television, radio, and online media	www.peabodyawards.com
Podcast Awards	New Media Expo	Best podcasts as voted by the general public	www.podcastawards.com
Premios Ídolo	Dulceida	Best in Spanish social media personalities	2022 - present www.premiosidolo.com
Runet Prize	Federal Agency on Press and Mass Communications of the Russian Federation	Top Russian language websites	premiaruneta.ru
Shorty Awards	Real Time Academy	People and organizations that produce real-time short form content across Twitter, Facebook, YouTube, Instagram, TikTok, Twitch and the rest of the social web	shortyawards.com
Slugger O’Toole Political Awards	Mick Fealty	Good examples of democratic practice (Northern Ireland)	Only in 2008
The Streamer Awards	QTCinderella	Best in live streaming	thestreamerawards.com
Streamy Awards	Tubefilter. Dick Clark Productions	Achievement in web television production	www.streamys.org
The Vtuber Awards	Filian	Best in the VTuber industry	https://thevtuberawards.com/
Web Cartoonists' Choice Awards	Scott Maddix and Mark Mekkes	Established webcartoonists nominated and selected outstanding webcomics	2001 to 2008
Web Fest	Excellence of internet achievements in the region of Former Yugoslavia	Web Fest llc	
Webby Award	International Academy of Digital Arts and Sciences	Websites, advertising and media, online film and video, mobile sites and apps, and social	www.webbyawards.com
The Weblog Awards (Bloggies)	Nikolai Nolan	Blog awards, with winners determined through internet voting by the public	2001 to 2015
The Weblog Awards (Wizbang)	Kevin Aylward's Wizbang LLC	Blog awards, with winners determined through internet voting by the public	2003 to 2008
YouTube Awards	YouTube	Best user-generated videos of the year	2007 to 2008
Yuri Rubinsky Memorial Award	The Web Conference	Individual who has contributed, through a lifetime of effort, to the care and feeding of the global information infrastructure	1995 to 1999
Web Awards	IT rating UA	Best of innovative web design in Ukraine	https://webawards.com.ua/

== See also ==
- Lists of awards
- List of computer-related awards
- List of webcomic awards
- List of media awards § Blog and podcasting
