= Julie Zhu =

New Zealand filmmaker and podcaster

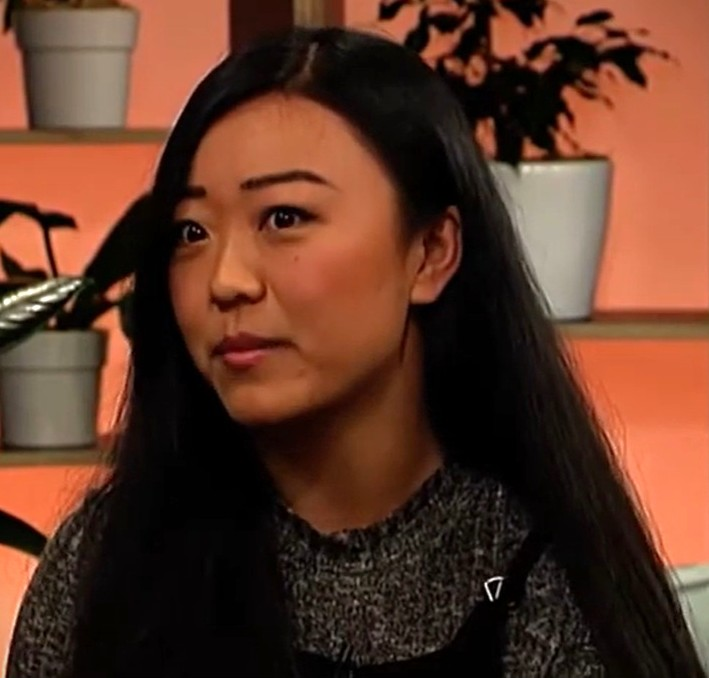
Zhu in 2017

Julie Zhu is a New Zealand documentary filmmaker, podcaster and photographer. She specialises in stories from marginalised communities. She has created both scripted and documentary content for Whakaata Māori, The Spinoff, TVNZ+, and Radio New Zealand.

== Biography ==
Zhu was born in Xi'an, China and grew up in Auckland.

Zhu co-directs and co-hosts the podcast and docu-series Conversations with My Immigrant Parents alongside Saraid de Silva for Radio New Zealand. She directed the observational documentary series Takeout Kids for The Spinoff; she won Best Director – NZ Factual at NZ Web Fest for her work on this series. Her short film Lǎo Lao Lǎo Le won her Best Director and Best NZ Film at Show Me Shorts 2023.

=== Filmography ===
Year	Title	Role	Notes
2024	Takeout Kids	Director	
2023	Lǎo Lao Lǎo Le	Director	
2022	Meng	Co-director	
2019–2023	Conversations with my Immigrant Parents	Producer and co-host	
	East Meets East	Director	
2017	OTHER [Chinese]	Producer	
