= List of awards and nominations received by Timbaland =

Timbaland awards and nominations
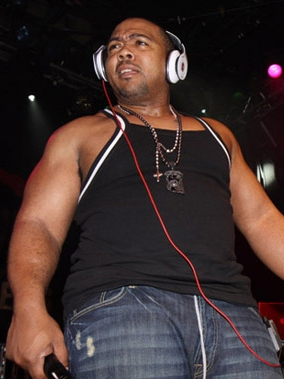
- Timbaland performing in West Hollywood, CA in January 2010 on The Shock Value II Tour
Awards and nominations
Award	Wins	Nominations
American Music Awards	0	1
Brit	0	1
Grammy	4	21
Juno	0	1
MTV Australia	1	1
MTV Europe	0	1
MTV VMA	0	4
People's Choice	1	1
Teen Choice	4	8
ASCAP Pop Music Awards	3	3
BET Hip Hop Awards	1	1
Vibe Awards	1	1

Totals (Note: Certain award groups do not simply award one winner. They acknowledge several different recipients, have runners-up, and have third place. Since this is a specific recognition and is different from losing an award, runner-up mentions are considered wins in this award tally. For simplification and to avoid errors, each award in this list has been presumed to have had a prior nomination.)
- Wins: 15
- Nominations: 39

Timbaland is an American record producer, composer, rapper, and singer. He produced the album Ginuwine...the Bachelor for Ginuwine in 1996. He was later contacted by Aaliyah in 1996 to help produce her second album One in a Million, which went on to sell over 15 million copies worldwide. Timbaland released his first solo studio album, Tim's Bio: Life from da Bassment, in 1998. Two years later, in 2000, Timbaland produced several hit songs including Ludacris' "Rollout (My Business)", and contributed three singles to Aaliyah's self-titled third album. He collaborated with Nelly Furtado on Loose and with Justin Timberlake on FutureSex/LoveSounds in 2006. Timbaland released his second solo studio album, Timbaland Presents Shock Value, in 2007, and helped produce Madonna's twelfth studio album, Hard Candy, released in 2008.

Timbaland has received 21 Grammy Award nominations, winning four awards: one of them is for his collaboration with Timberlake on "SexyBack" in 2007, and another one for "LoveStoned", another collaboration with Timberlake, in 2008. Timbaland has also found success at the Teen Choice Awards, winning four awards from eight nominations. He won awards for both of his nominations in 2006, for "Choice Summer Track" and "Choice R&B/Hip-Hop Track" for the song "Promiscuous", a collaboration with Furtado. Overall, Timbaland has received fifteen awards from 39 nominations.

== American Music Awards ==
The American Music Awards is an annual awards ceremony created by Dick Clark in 1973. Timbaland has received one nomination.

Year	Nominee / work	Award	Result
2007	Timbaland	Favorite Pop/Rock Male Artist	Nominated

== American Society of Composers, Authors and Publishers ==
American Society of Composers, Authors and Publishers (ASCAP) is a non-profit performance rights organization that also holds a series of annual awards shows. Timbaland has received three awards.

Year	Nominee / work	Award	Result
2001	Timbaland	Songwriter of the Year	Won
2003	Timbaland	Songwriter of the Year	Won
2008	Timbaland	Songwriter of the Year	Won

== BET Awards ==
The BET Awards is an annual awards show hosted by Black Entertainment Television. Timbaland has received one award.

Year	Nominee / work	Award	Result
2020	Timbaland (recipient)	"Shine A Light" Award for VERZUZ (Co-recipients Swizz Beatz & DJ D-Nice)	Honoree

== BET Hip Hop Awards ==
The BET Hip Hop Awards is an annual awards show hosted by Black Entertainment Television. Timbaland has received one award.

Year	Nominee / work	Award	Result
2007	Timbaland	Producer of the Year	Won

== BRIT Awards ==
The BRIT Awards are the British Phonographic Industry's not annual pop music awards. Timbaland has received one nomination.

Year	Nominee / work	Award	Result
2008	Timbaland	Best International Male Solo Artist	Nominated

== Grammy Awards ==
The Grammy Awards are awarded annually by the National Academy of Recording Arts and Sciences of the United States. Timbaland has received 4 awards from 21 nominations.

Year	Nominee / work	Award	Result
1998	Supa Dupa Fly (as producer)	Best Rap Album	Nominated
2000	Da Real World (as producer & engineer/mixer)	Best Rap Album	Nominated
2002	"Get Ur Freak On" (as songwriter)	Best R&B Song	Nominated
2004	"Work It" (as songwriter)	Best Rap Song	Nominated
2004	Under Construction (as producer)	Album of the Year	Nominated
2004	Justified (as producer)	Album of the Year	Nominated
2005	The Diary of Alicia Keys (as producer)	Album of the Year	Nominated
2007	FutureSex/LoveSounds (as producer)	Album of the Year	Nominated
2007	"Promiscuous"	Best Pop Collaboration with Vocals	Nominated
2007	"Sexy Back"	Best Dance Recording	Won
2008	"LoveStoned/I Think She Knows"	Best Dance Recording	Won
2008	Timbaland	Producer of the Year, Non-Classical	Nominated
2008	"Ayo Technology" (as songwriter)	Best Rap Song	Nominated
2008	"What Goes Around... Comes Around"	Record of the Year	Nominated
2008	"Give It to Me" (featuring Nelly Furtado & Justin Timberlake)	Best Pop Collaboration with Vocals	Nominated
2009	"4 Minutes" (with Madonna & Justin Timberlake)	Best Pop Collaboration with Vocals	Nominated
2014	"Holy Grail" (as songwriter)	Best Rap Song	Nominated
2014	"Pusher Love Girl" (as songwriter)	Best R&B Song	Won
2015	"Drunk in Love" (as songwriter)	Best R&B Song	Won
2015	Beyoncé (as producer)	Album of the Year	Nominated
2016	Empire: Season 1	Best Compilation Soundtrack for Visual Media	Nominated

== Juno Awards ==
The Juno Awards is a Canadian awards ceremony presented annually by the Canadian Academy of Recording Arts and Sciences. Timbaland has received one nomination.

Year	Nominee / work	Award	Result
2008	Shock Value	International Album of the Year	Nominated

== MTV Australia Awards ==
The MTV Australia Awards is an annual awards ceremony established in 2005 by MTV Australia. Timbaland has received one award.

Year	Nominee / work	Award	Result
2007	"Sexyback"	Best Hook-Up	Won

== MTV Europe Music Awards ==
The MTV Europe Music Awards is an annual awards ceremony established in 1994 by MTV Europe. Timbaland has received one nomination.

Year	Nominee / work	Award	Result
2007	Timbaland	Ultimate Urban	Nominated

== MTV Video Music Awards ==
The MTV Video Music Awards is an annual awards ceremony established in 1984 by MTV. Timbaland has received four nominations.

Year	Nominee / work	Award	Result
2007	"Sexyback"	Most Earthshattering Collaboration	Nominated
2007	"The Way I Are"	Monster Single of the Year	Nominated
2007	"Promiscuous"	Best Pop Video	Nominated
2007	"Promiscuous"	Best Dance Video	Nominated

== People's Choice Awards ==
The People's Choice Awards is an awards show that has been held annually since 1975. Timbaland has received one award.

Year	Nominee / work	Award	Result
2008	"Give It to Me"	Favorite Hip-Hop Song	Won

== Teen Choice Awards ==
The Teen Choice Awards is an awards show presented annually by the Fox Broadcasting Company. Timbaland has received four awards from eight nominations.

Year	Nominee / work	Award	Result
2003	"Cry Me a River"	Choice Music Hook Up	Nominated
2006	"Promiscuous"	Choice Summer Track	Won
2006	"Promiscuous"	Choice R&B/Hip-Hop Track	Won
2007	"The Way I Are"	Choice Rap Track	Won
2007	"Give It to Me"	Choice Music Single	Nominated
2007	Timbaland	Choice Rap Artist	Won
2007	Timbaland	Choice Male Artist	Nominated
2010	"If We Ever Meet Again"	Choice Music Hook Up	Nominated

== Vibe Awards ==
The Vibe Awards is an annual awards ceremony held on the UPN television network by Vibe. Timbaland has received one award.

Year	Nominee / work	Award	Result
2007	Timbaland	Producer of the Year	Won

== Webby Awards ==
The Webby Award is an award for excellence on the Internet presented annually by The International Academy of Digital Arts and Sciences. Timbaland has received one award.

Year	Nominee/ work	Award	Result
2020	Timbaland & Swizz Beatz	Special Achievement - 'Break The Internet' Award, VERZUZ	Won
