= Eric Corton =

Dutch presenter, actor, author and disk jockey

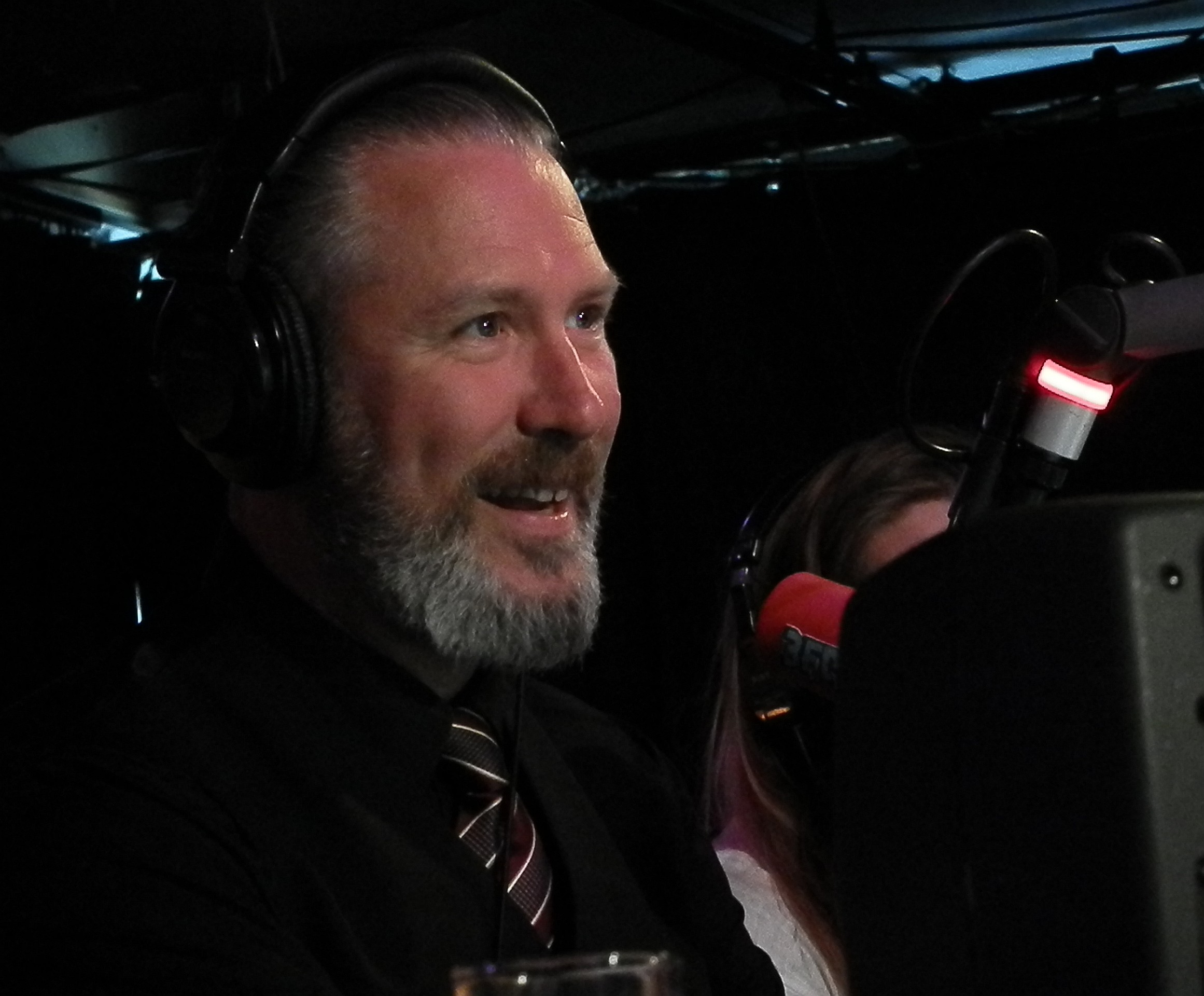
- Eric Corton
- Born: Eric Corton; 11 January 1969 (age 57); Oosterbeek, Netherlands
- Occupations: Actor, presenter, author, disk jockey, singer, guitarist
- Years active: 1995–present

Eric Corton (born 11 January 1969 in Oosterbeek) is a Dutch presenter, actor, author and disk jockey.

== Career ==
Eric Corton is an educated actor whose alma mater is the Maastricht Academy of Dramatic Arts. He is a celebrity and a television personality in the Netherlands. He sang and played guitar for the Eric Corton Trio and Tacker. Despite his thorough acting background, Eric got known as a diskjockey at Dutch radio station 3FM before anything else, while his characteristic voice was used in numerous commercials.

=== Acting ===
In 1995 Corton featured in the Veronica-series '20 Plus'. He met his wife Diana Sno on set. He was also part of the a comedy company Purper, which played in theaters. He played in several Dutch movies and television series, but due to other commitments these were not substantial roles. Most characters he played were tailored to his warm voice, or his typical masculine appearance.

In 2012 he was cast for the series Penoza, alongside actress Monic Hendrickx, in a cast featuring several top-rated actors in the Netherlands. In the series, he plays the character of John de Weerd, a big-hearted, withdrawn and loving man, who would not harm a fly, but who is married to a Carmen (played by Monic Hendrickx) who gets dragged deeper and deeper into the world of the international organized crime against her own will, due to the mistakes her late husband and brother had made. The character of John strongly disapproves of the actions his wife has to take, but he lets her, out of his eyesight. In the meantime he takes care of both her and his sons from prior relationships, as well as Camen's orphaned grandson.

=== Presenting ===
In 2002 and 2003 Eric provided voice over for Robot Wars: The Dutch Battles, a spin-off from the British television show.

He also presented ‘De Garage’ for another broadcaster and several radio shows.

=== DJ ===
Eric is a radio host and DJ. He has been embraced by the Dutch rock scene. He is also an avid supporter of live music, using his radio station to promote Dutch live bands. One of the bands that profited from Eric's support is Voicst, which he aired for a long period of time on his radio shows.

=== Music ===
Eric is a well-known rock fan and has testified on this in several interviews.

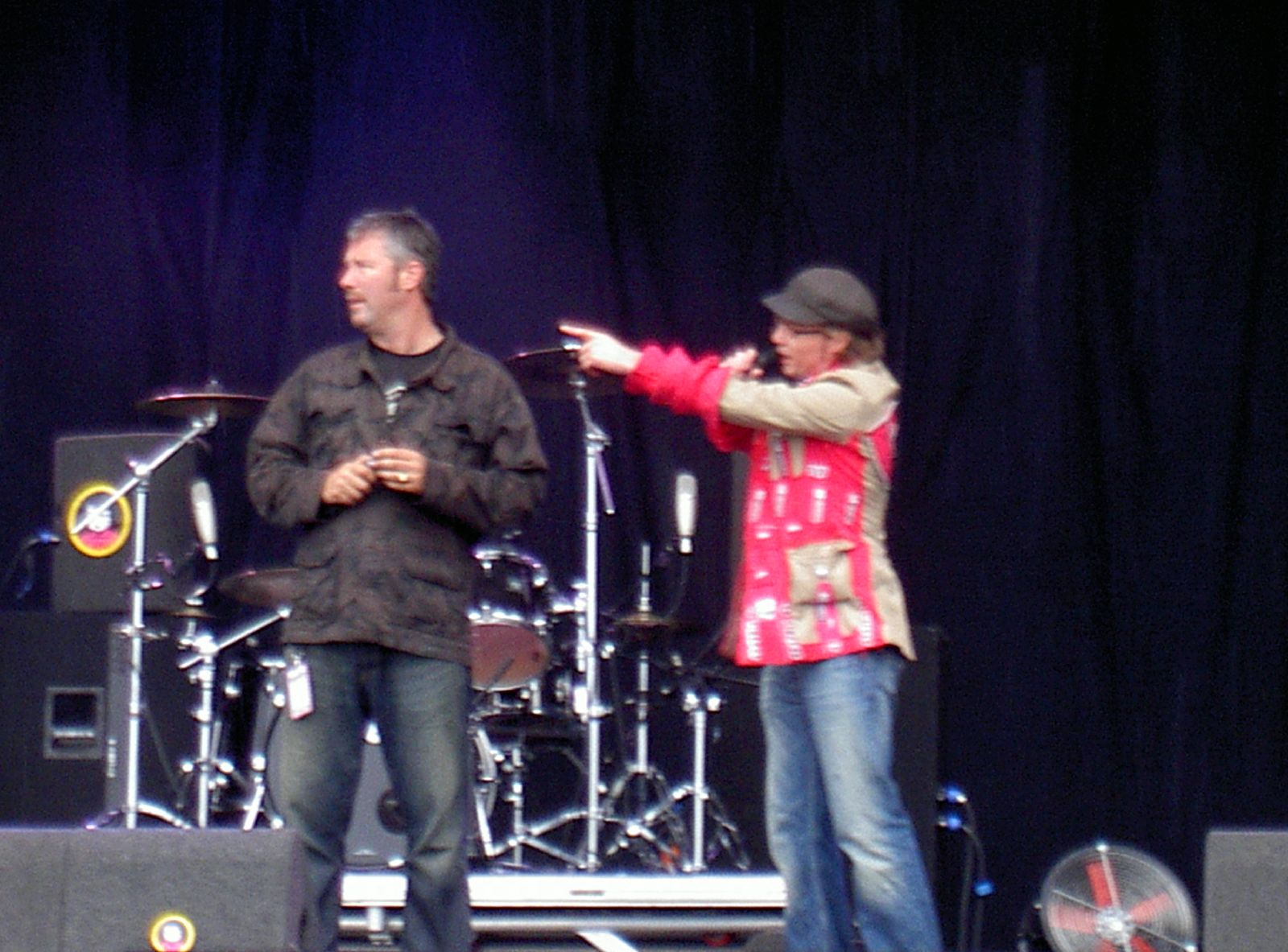
Eric Corton en Giel Beelen, Pinkpop 2007.jpg

He was a guest as fan of Queens of the Stone Age on Dutch television show De Wereld Draait Door.

Eric has had a career as a musician himself. The highlight in Eric's career was his band Tacker. He also was part of the Eric Corton Trio

He also shared the stage with Seasick Steve and the Belgian rockband Triggerfinger at the Pinkpop Festival, being announced as "the most handsome grey man from Holland", by Triggerfinger singer Ruben Blok.

Eric Corton is co-initiator of Cortonville, a live music platform for Dutch musicians, including album reviews, interviews, reports, backgrounds and concert registrations. Cortonville also organizes music events and small tours, in which new and coming bands are often given a change to play to bigger audiences than they normally would.

=== Writing ===
Eric Corton has a big love for cars. He has owned many cars and mentioned on Dutch television: I can fall in love with a car, but when I see another one I fall in love with, my current car has to go. That's my form of infidelity like a rock star, while I treat my actual wife with a lot more respect and devotion. He wrote a book following the cars he owned, suitably dubbed ‘Eric Corton: Auto-Biography’, which was released in 2013.

In 2010 he wrote 'Wilde Wereld’ (which means "wild world"), about African Stories. This was Eric's debut as an author and it describes stories he heard from African children for his work as ambassador for The Red Cross.

== Trivia ==
In 2011 he received the "Pop Media Award". The jury described him as a "musician, DJ, program maker, tv-presenter, and an advocate for alternative music on stations that usually don't pay attention to it in particular".

He officially married a couple as a special Civil registry servant. He did this in 2007, in the Glass House, after an auction for Serious Request.

Eric Corton is an ambassador for The Red Cross. He travels to Africa to show Dutch viewers what this year's theme for Serious Request is and why it is important. This gave him the official title "Mr Serious Request".

Despite being born in 1969 he works for BNN, which explicitly aims at a teenage and young adult audience. Besides hosting shows, he is the voice-over or announcement voice for most BNN radio and television shows.

He was a candidate for the Dutch House of Representatives in 2021 for the GreenLeft party, running as a lijstduwer. He also fulfilled the same role in the 2026 Dutch municipal elections in Amsterdam.

== Private life ==
Eric Corton is married to actress Diana Sno. The couple has one son and a daughter.

Eric was born in Oosterbeek, near Arnhem, but now resides in Amsterdam.
