= The Feather (award) =

Dutch music industry award

The Feather is an award for a person within the Dutch music industry who has made an outstanding contribution to the Dutch music product in the past year. The Feather is awarded on an annual basis during the European music conference and showcase festival Eurosonic Noorderslag in Groningen.

== Winners ==
- 2025 - Tony van de Berkt
- 2024 - Anita Verheggen
- 2023 - Brahim Fouradi
- 2022 - Raymond van Vliet
- 2020 - Rob Trommelen
- 2019 - Peter Smidt
- 2018 - Kees van der Hoeven
- 2016 - Wilbert Mutsaers
- 2015 - Eelko van Kooten
- 2014 - André de Raaff
- 2013 - David Schreurs
- 2012 - Maykel Piron
- 2011 - Pieter van Bodegraven
- 2010 - Jaap Buijs
- 2009 - Jerney Kaagman
- 2008 - Theo Roos
- 2007 - Paul Brinks
- 2006 - Kees de Koning
- 2005 - Marcel Albers
- 2004 - Willem Venema
- 2003 - Ferry Roseboom
- 2002 - Roy Teysse
- 2001 - Riny Schreijenberg
- 2000 - Daan van Rijsbergen
- 1999 - Saskia Slegers
- 1998 - Tony Berk
