= Saraid de Silva =

Iranian/NZ filmmaker, actor and writer

- Born: 1991 (age 34–35); Hamilton, New Zealand
- Education: University of Auckland, Unitec Institute of Technology
- Occupations: Writer, Script Editor
- Notable work: Amma (2024)

Saraid de Silva is a Sri Lankan writer, podcaster and creative from New Zealand. Her work pulls from her diasporic experiences as a third culture child as well as a queer woman of colour.

== Life & career ==
de Silva was born in Hamilton in 1991, living in various places in New Zealand, and now based in Auckland. Her mother is Sinhalese Sri Lankan and her father Pākeha. de Silva was raised by her mother and Singaporean born grandmother and attended Catholic schooling in New Zealand.

de Silva started an English Literature and Law Degree at Victoria University of Wellington, completing a year before moving to Auckland for study. She graduated with a Bachelor of Performing & Screen Arts at Unitec Institute of Technology in 2012. In 2021 de Silva completed a Masters of Creative Writing at the University of Auckland. She has worked on various New Zealand television shows, and on Shortland Street, as a story liner, scriptwriter and script editor.

In 2025, de Silva’s novel Amma was longlisted for the Jann Medlicott Acorn Prize for Fiction in the Ockham New Zealand Book Awards. Amma was also longlisted for the Women’s Prize for Fiction.

=== Plays ===
Year	Title	Involvement	Ref
2013	Stomach	Writer, actor	
2014	The Memory Shelf	Writer, actor	
2018	Cult Show	Writer, actor	
2018	Drowning in Milk	Writer, actor	

=== Podcasts ===
In 2019, de Silva and Chinese New Zealand filmmaker and photographer, Julie Zhu started the RNZ podcast, Conversations with my Immigrant Parents. The podcast video series explores stories of immigrant families across New Zealand, discussing themes such as their connections to home, their ancestry, love, familial expectations, food and racism.

=== Books ===
Year	Title	About	Ref
2021	A Clear Dawn: New Asian Voices from Aotearoa New Zealand	Includes an excerpt of essay 'Mitzi'.	
2024	Amma	Amma is a fictional novel that follows the life of three generations of women living between Singapore, Sri Lanka, New Zealand, Australia and England.	

de Silva notes the inspiration for her novel Amma, came from the grief experiences from losing her Grandmother.

== Awards ==
In 2018 de Silva's play, Drowning in Milk, received the Social Impact Award at the Auckland Fringe Festival. She also won the 2021 Crystal Trust Prize, awarded to the best portfolio of the Master of Creative Writing programme at the University of Auckland, for the manuscript that would become her debut novel, Amma.

In 2025, The Randell Cottage Writers Trust selected de Silva as their Writer-in-Residence for 2025.
