= Andi Almqvist =

Swedish singer, musician and composer

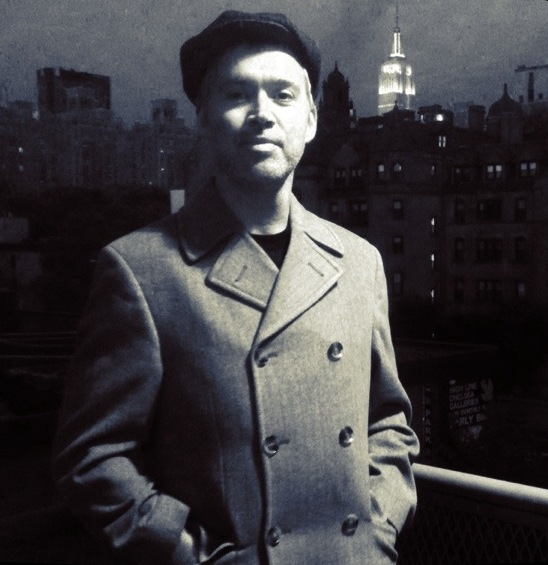
- Andi Almqvist in New York City, 2012.

Background information
- Born: 2 July 1968 (age 58); Sweden
- Occupations: Singer, musician, composer
- Instruments: Vocals, guitar, piano
- Years active: 2004–present
- Labels: Ella Ruth Institutet, Warner Music, Bad Taste Records, Zentropa Music, Feeble Music, City Hall Records, Rootsy, Sonic Rendezvous

Andi Almqvist (born 2 July 1968) is a Swedish singer, musician and composer known for his dark, cinematic sound and haunting lyrics.

Almqvist has released seven solo albums, Can't Stop Laughing (2005), Red Room Stories (2007), Glimmer (2009), Warsaw Holiday (2013), Tiltad (2018), Not Too Far From Happy (2024) and We're All Gonna Die But I Can Live With That (2026).

== Touring ==
Andi Almqvist has toured extensively over the years, headlining or supporting artists like Woven Hand, Mark Lanegan, Holly Golightly, Kaizer's Orchestra, B.B. King, The Blind Boys of Alabama and Bettye LaVette among others.

Almqvist has played many of Europe's big festivals, such as Eurosonic Festival (Holland), Les Ardentes (Belgium), Spot Festival (Denmark), Dias Nordicos (Spain), Peace & Love (Sweden), and Hultsfred Festival (Sweden).

He has performed at venues around the world such as Joe's Pub in New York City, 3rd & Lindsley in Nashville, Club Passim in Boston, Borderline in London, Kulturbrauerei in Berlin and many others.

== Miscellaneous ==
During July and August 2010, Almqvist's song Low-Dive Jenny was the most downloaded on well-known American music magazine Paste Magazine's website.

In May 2011 the documentary "The Misadventures of Andi Almqvist" aired on Swedish national television. The film was released on DVD in November 2011.

In February 2012, Almqvist's song Big Bad Black Dog Blues was featured in American TV-series Justified, episode 5, season 3.

In May 2012 Andi Almqvist signed with Zentropa Music, the music division of film company Zentropa. Almqvist-song I Was Not To You What You Were to Me was featured in Thomas Vinterbergs film The Hunt, which was nominated for the Golden Palm in Cannes 2012. Mads Mikkelsen won the Best Actor Award for his performance in the movie. The Hunt was also nominated for an Academy Award for Best Foreign Language Film.

In February 2015 Almqvist made his debut as actor/soloist in the Swedish musical Sånger Från En Inställd Skilsmässa, a collaboration between Malmö Opera and Skånes Dansteater.

In the spring of 2017, Swedish musical Sånger Från En Inställd Skilsmässa, toured entire Sweden. The national tour was produced by Riksteatern.

In November 2017 Almqvist released the single Kirseberg, his first song in the Swedish language.

In April 2018 Almqvist released the album Tiltad, also in Swedish.

In October 2024 Almqvist released the album Not Too Far From Happy.

In September 2026 Almqvist released the album We're All Gonna Die But I Can Live With That.

== Discography ==
Studio albums

- 2026 - We're All Gonna Die But I Can Live With That
- 2024 - Not Too Far From Happy
- 2018 - Tiltad
- 2013 - Warsaw Holiday
- 2009 - Glimmer
- 2007 - Red Room Stories
- 2005 - Can't Stop Laughing

Live albums

- 2022 - Live In Malmö
- 2011 - The Misadventures of Andi Almqvist

with KURZ

- 2016 - Vol 1.

== Filmography ==
- 2011 - The Misadventures of Andi Almqvist – Concert and documentary DVD

== Bibliography ==
- 2013 - Söta Serier - Comic book. Swedish language.

== Placements Film/TV ==
- 2019 - The Cultural Masturbator. Swedish documentary by Lena Mattsson. Contributes with the songs In The Land Of Slumber and Boneyard Blues.
- 2017 - Angie Tribeca. American TV-series. Season 3. Trailer. Contributes with the song You ain't seen nothing yet (cover).
- 2017 - Early Release. Canadian movie directed by John L'Ecuyer. Contributes with the song Weekend Trip to Hell.
- 2014 - The Absent One. Danish movie directed by Mikkel Nørgaard. Contributes with the song I Was Not To You What You Were To Me.
- 2014 - Filip & Fredrik - Ska vi göra slut?. Swedish TV-series. Contributes with the song I Was Not To You What You Were To Me.
- 2013 - My Sweet Pepper Land. French/German movie directed by Huner Saleem. Contributes with the song Take Heed, Beware, Let Go.
- 2013 - Niklas Mat. Swedish TV-series. Contributes with the songs Boneyard Blues and Big Bad Black Dog Blues.
- 2013 - The Keeper Of Lost Causes. Danish movie directed by Mikkel Nørgaard. Contributes with the song I Was Not To You What You Were To Me.
- 2012 - The Hunt. Danish movie directed by Thomas Vinterberg. Contributes with the song I Was Not To You What You Were To Me. The movie was nominated for an Academy Award for best foreign language film. The movie was also nominated for the Golden Palm in Cannes.
- 2012 - Justified, #5 season 3. American TV-series. Contributes with the song Big Bad Black Dog Blues.
- 2012 - Sejit z cesty. Czech movie directed by Pavel Jandourek. Contributes with the songs Hyena and Big Bad Black Dog Blues.
- 2007 - Älgalus och vilda svin. Swedish documentary directed by Johan Palmgren. Contributes with the songs Can't Stop Laughing and The Devil Is A Girl.

== Theater ==
- 2017 - Sånger Från En Inställd Skilsmässa. Swedish national tour, produced på Riksteatern. Soloist/lead role.
- 2015 - Sånger Från En Inställd Skilsmässa, a co-production by Malmö Opera and Skånes Dansteater. South Sweden tour. Soloist/lead role.

== Music videos ==
- Not Too Far From Happy
- Wormwood
- Low-Dive Jenny
- Pornography
- Midnight
- Death
- Red Room
