= De Kift =

Dutch musical ensemble

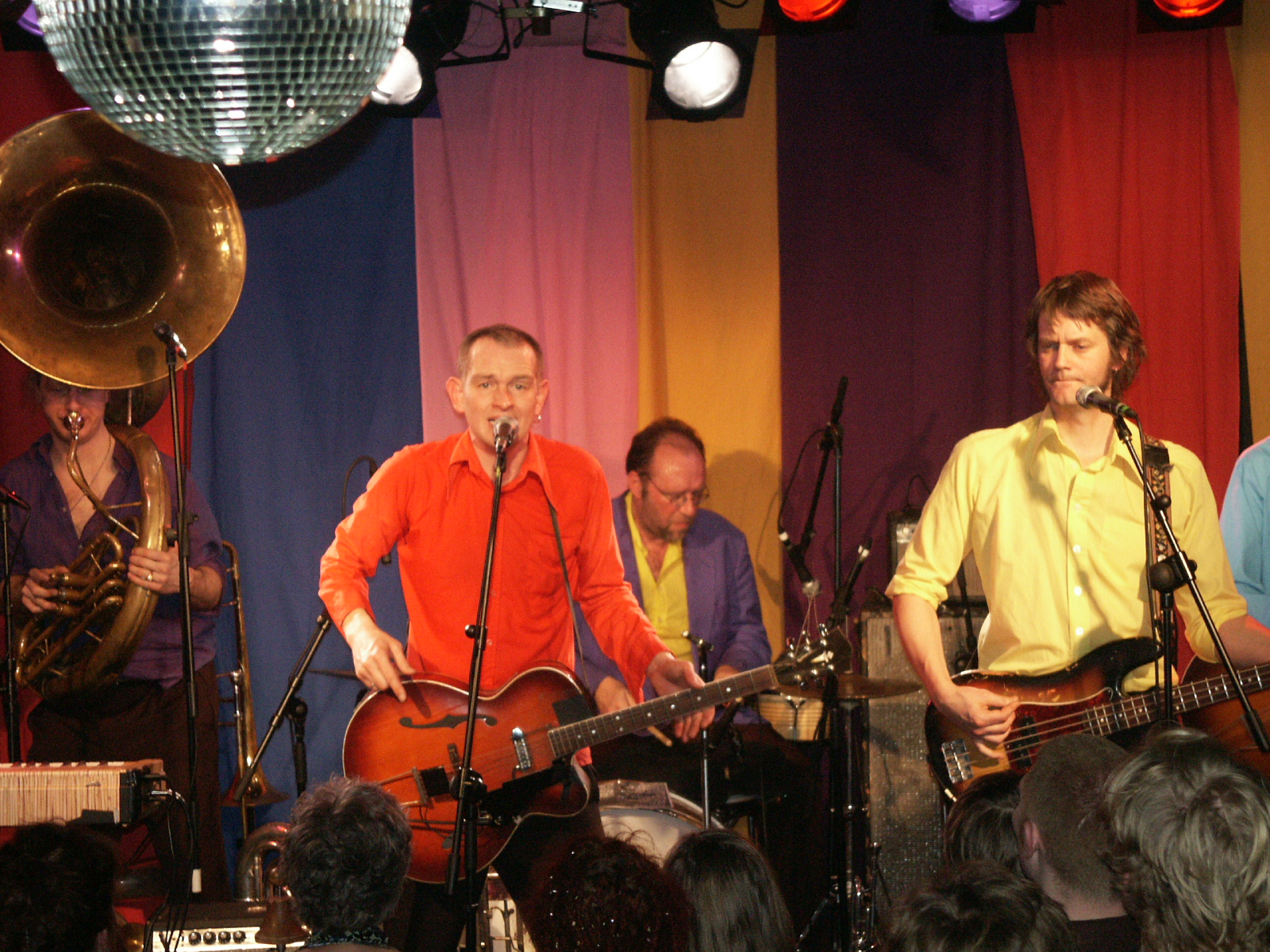
De Kift in the ACU in Utrecht on March 19, 2006.

De Kift is a Dutch musical ensemble that was formed in 1988. Their music might be best classified as fanfare with influences of rock and punk. The band is closely connected to and befriended with The Ex with whom they did several projects together.

The band won the Dutch Zilveren Harp award in 2001.

== Band members ==
- Ferry Heijne (vocals, trombone, trumpet, guitar)
- Jan Heijne (trumpet)
- Han Hulscher (trumpet)
- Patrick Votrian (trombone, tuba)
- Mathijs Houwink (double bass)
- Wim ter Weele (drum, guitar, vocals)
- Pim Heijne (guitar, banjo)
- Marco Heijne (vocals)

== Discography ==
- Niemandsland (2024)
- Hoogriet (2020)
- Bal (2017)
- Bidonville (2014)
- Brik (2011)
- Hoofdkaas (2008)
- 7 (2006)
- De Kift 2005 (2004 / 2006) (Mon Slip, Warner Music France / North East Indie Records)
- Vier Voor Vier (2003)
- Koper (2001)
- Vlaskoorts (1999)
- Gaaphonger (1997)
- Krankenhaus (1993)
- Yverzucht (1989)
