= Roosbeef =

Dutch pop band

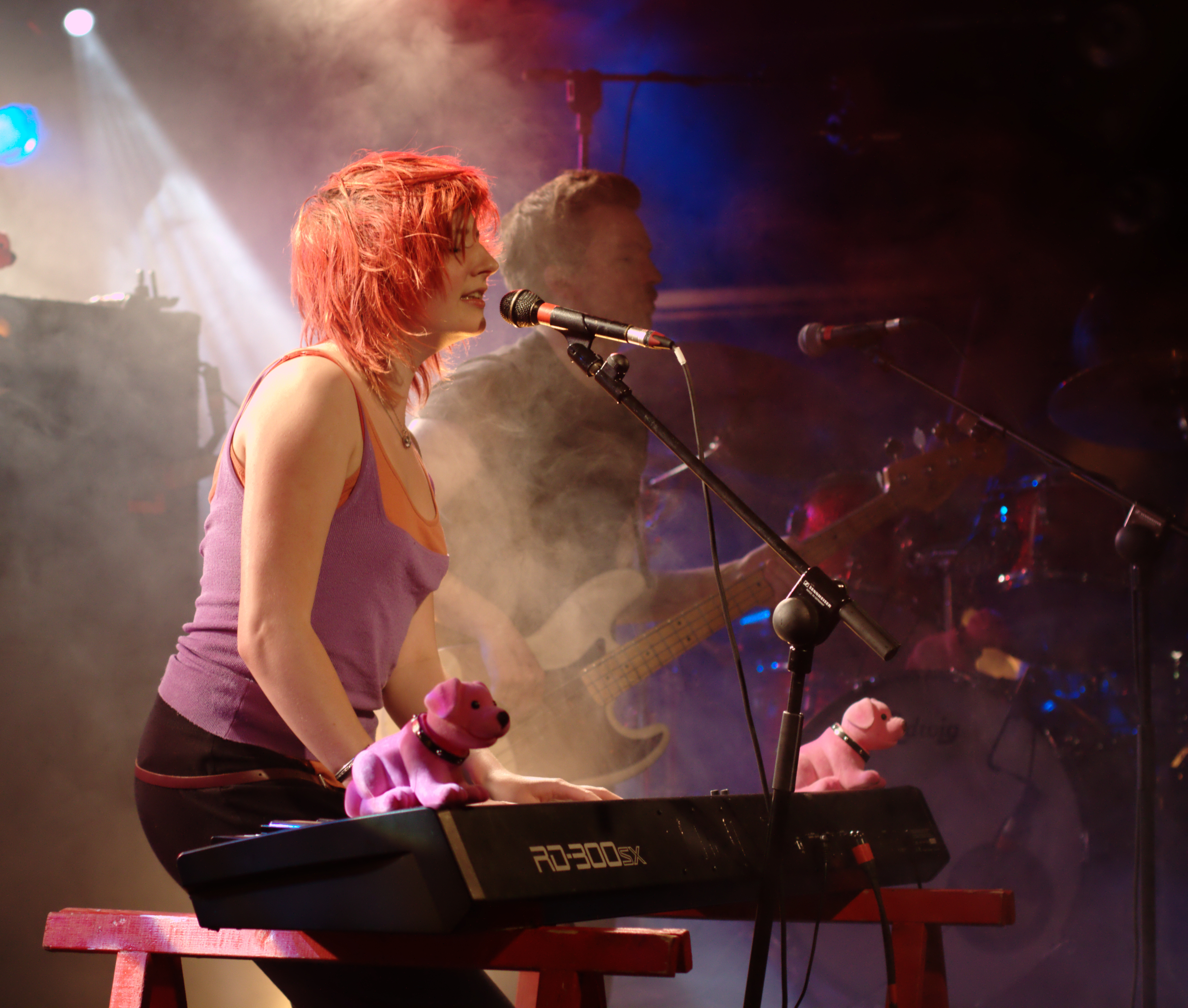
- Roosbeef performing in 2009

Background information
- Origin: Duiven, Netherlands
- Genres: Pop music
- Years active: 2005–present
- Members: Roos Rebergen; Tim van Oosten; Tijs Delbeke
- Past members: Tom Pintens (died 2023)
- Website: www.roosbeef.nl

Roosbeef is a Dutch band from Duiven formed around singer-songwriter Roos Rebergen. They are acclaimed for their original lyrics and musical style. Rebergen describes their style as melodic pop music with a raw edge.

The band won the Grote Prijs van Nederland in the category singer-songwriter in 2005. A self-titled EP was released in 2007.

They released their first full-length album, titled Ze Willen Wel Je Hond Aaien Maar Niet Met Je Praten ("They Do Want To Pet Your Dog, But They Don't Want To Talk To You") on 15 December 2008. It entered the Dutch Album Top 100 on 20 December 2008, and reached its highest position of 16th seven weeks later. The album has been described as refreshing and original.

Their second album Omdat ik dat wil was released on 9 September 2011. It was a greater popular success than the preceding album, reaching the 6th position on the Dutch Album Top 100.
