= ZZz =

Dutch band

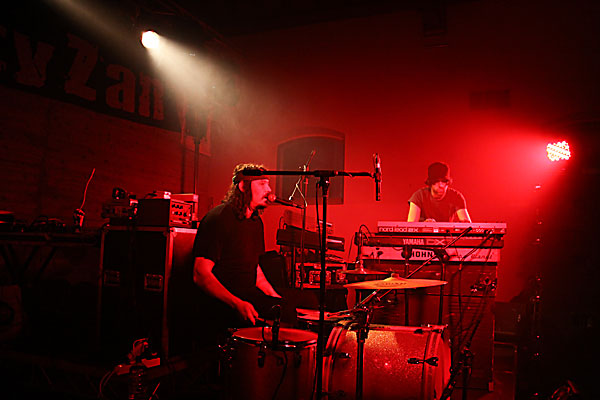
zZz in concert.

zZz is a Dutch band from Amsterdam, founded in 2001, formed by Björn Ottenheim and Daan Schinkel. On their first album, the instruments of the band consisted of an organ and a drumkit. They made their first demo in 2002. Their first album, Sound of zZz, was released in 2005. After the release of their second album, Running with the Beast in 2008, they were busy with other music projects, such as writing soundtracks and doing a side project with the band Saelors titled Light Light.

They have since incorporated other electronic and live elements into their sound. The duo makes dark, danceable rock music. The single "Ecstasy" was used in the soundtrack of the film Phileine zegt sorry and in an episode of the fourth season of Skins. In 2005, the band won an Essent Award and opened for Anouk in a few shows.

In 2007, they opened the exhibition Nederclips in Stedelijk Museum's-Hertogenbosch SM's by recording a video for the track "Grip", with producer Roel Wouters, for a live Audience. "zZz is playing: Grip" has been screened at festivals all over the world. It has won best music video award at Festival du Clip in Paris and the Best Short Award at the Playgrounds festival in Tilburg. It was nominated as Best Animation for the Dutch Design Award 2008, as Best International Video at the MVA in London, for cutting edge Dutch music video at IAFF 2008. The song "Grip" and the concept of the music video have been used in a Fiat ad.

The song "O.F.G." was used in the soundtrack of the video game Driver: Parallel Lines. The song "Soul" is featured in the soundtrack of the video game Driver: San Francisco in 2011.

The third album Juggernaut came out in 2015. After ten years of silence, zZz released a fourth album こんにちは Guten Tag Money Money, followed by a clubtour called Konnichiwa Guten Tag Money Money in the Netherlands.

== Band members ==
- Björn Ottenheim - vocals, drums
- Daan Schinkel - organ

== Discography ==
=== Albums ===
- Sound of zZz (2005)
- Running with the Beast (2008)
- Juggernaut (2015)
- こんにちは Guten Tag Money Money

=== Singles ===
- Ecstasy (2005)
- Grip (2008)
