= Pop Media Award =

The Pop Media Award (called the Pop Press Award until 2007) is an award which aims to encourage Dutch pop journalism. Since 2004 the Pop Media Award is awarded on an annual basis during the European music conference and showcase festival Eurosonic Noorderslag in Groningen. The Pop Media Award is awarded for the entire oeuvre of a pop journalist, mainly taking into account the achievements of the past year. The award includes a gift of 2500 euro’s. The Pop Media Award is presented by Music Centre The Netherlands.

== Winners ==
- 2021 - Timo Pisart
- 2020 - Beste Zangers
- 2019 - Rob Stenders
- 2018 - Fernando Halman
- 2017 - Roosmarijn Reijmer
- 2016 - Rotjoch
- 2015 - Rutger Geerling
- 2014 - Atze de Vrieze
- 2013 - Mary Go Wild / Mark van Bergen
- 2012 - Saul van Stapele
- 2011 - DWDD Recordings
- 2010 - Eric Corton
- 2009 - Sander Donkers
- 2008 - Jan van der Plas
- 2007 - Leo Blokhuis
- 2006 - John Schoorl
- 2005 - Leon Verdonschot
- 2004 - Lex van Rossen
- 2003 - Hester Carvalho
- 2002 - 3voor12
- 2001 - Gijsbert Kamer
- 2000 - Anton Corbijn
- 1999 - Herman van der Horst
- 1998 - Tom Engelshoven
- 1997 - Martin Bril
- 1996 - David Kleijwegt
- 1995 - Jip Golsteijn
- 1994 - Bert van de Kamp
