= Meindert Talma & the Negroes =

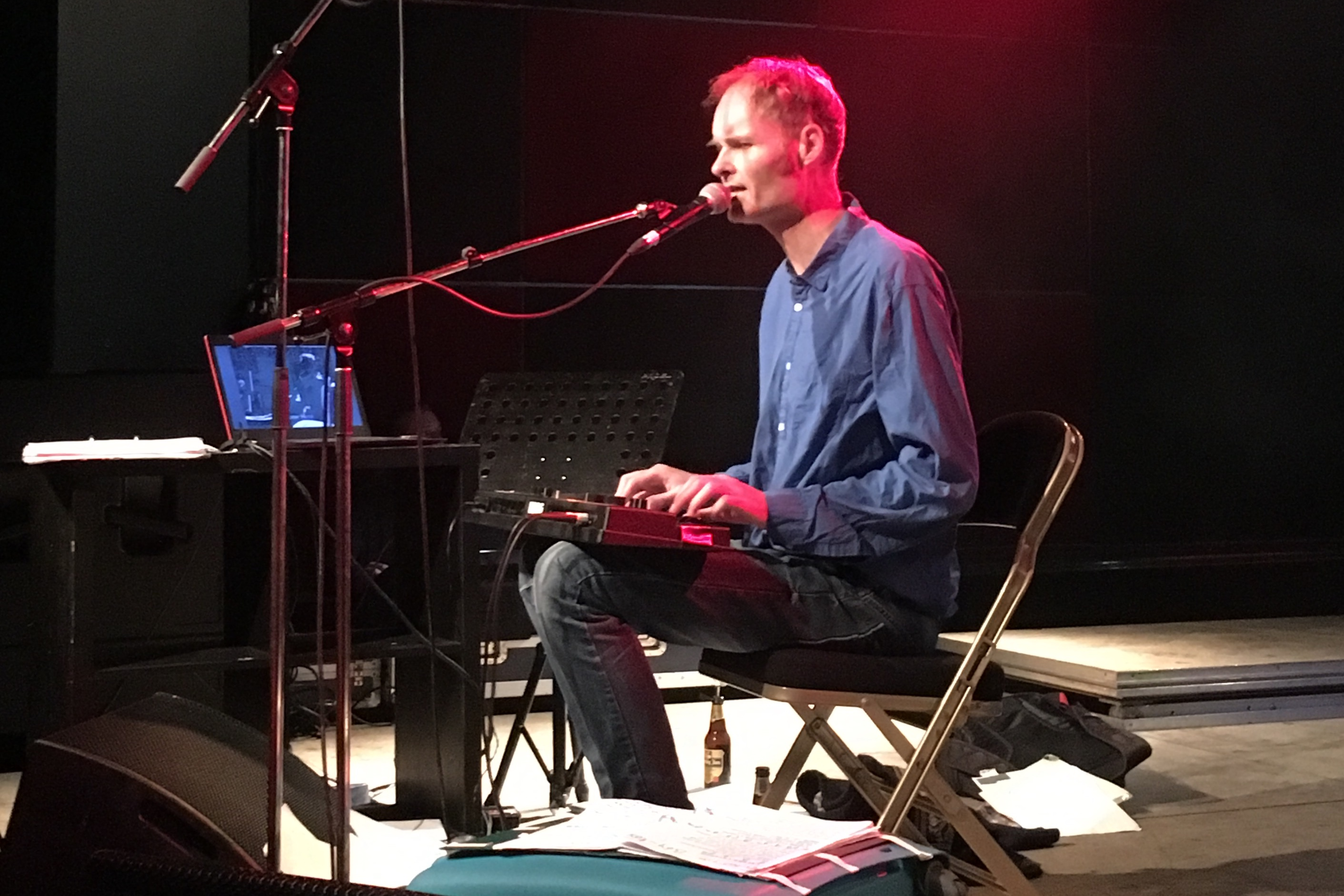

Background information
- Origin: The Netherlands
- Genres: Lo-fi, alternative
- Years active: 1995– present
- Label: Excelsior Recordings
- Members: Meindert Talma – vocals, keyboards Jan Pier Brands – drums, guitar, vocals Janke Brands – bass guitar vocals Niek de Vries – drums, guitar, vocals
- Website: meinderttalma.nl

Meindert Talma (born 2 November 1968 in Surhuisterveen) is a Dutch lo-fi singer and keyboardist whose backing band goes by the name of "the Negroes." He sings in Dutch as well as Frisian and English and has released seven albums as of 2007. Talma is notable for his humorous, satirical songs.

== Musical career ==
In 1995, friends of Meindert Talma pressed some of his home recordings on a single as a birthday gift. Unexpectedly the record was a hit and Talma became popular in the alternative music scene in Groningen. Two years later, Talma and a group of friends (the Negroes) recorded a debut album, Hondert punten ("Hundred points").

In 1998, the follow-up album Ferhûddûker was recorded in the Pet Sound studio and produced by Jan Heddema. The album was released by Hooverflag (De Konkurrent). With this album Meindert Talma & The Negroes became a permanent band. Aside from Talma, the band then consisted of Janke Brands (bass), Janpier Brands (drums, guitar), and Nyk de Vries (guitar, drums).

Dammen met ome Hajo ("Checkers with uncle Hajo") was the band's third release. It was recorded at Studio Enterprise, produced by Frans Hagenaars, and released in 1999 on independent record label Excelsior Recordings. The album functioned as the soundtrack to a book of the same title and both were based on Talma's childhood memories and his early student years in Groningen.

In early 2001 the band recorded Leave stumper with Frans Hagenaars taking the production chair once again. The album was released in November and contained a special CD booklet with illustrations from Gummbah and Jeroen de Leijer. In May of that year, Ben Onderstijn took the place of drummer Nyk de Vries until the end of 2002 when de Vries returned.

For his next album, Talma asked labelmates from Excelsior Recordings to participate with Anne Soldaat (guitar), Jeroen Kleijn (drums), and Cor van Ingen (bass) lending their services. This album was also accompanied by a book which appeared with publisher Thomas Rap. The covers of the book and the CD were created by Peter Pontiac. Titled Kriebelvisje, the album was released in March 2003. The Negroes returned for the subsequent live performances but Talma also performed solo as an opening act for Spinvis during a theater tour.

With the song "Callgirl," Talma previewed his English language project Tamango. The song appears on the compilation The Pet Series volume 3. In addition to this Talma also contributes a cover of "Someone Loves You Honey" (June Lodge) to the compilation More Than A Woman in February 2004. In October of that year, Meindert Talma & the Negroes won the Frisian songfestival with the song "Dunsje wyldekat dunsje."

This song also appeared on the fifth untitled release by the band, once again released by Excelsior Recordings. The album was self-produced and was recorded in a home studio in Drachster Compagnie. Meindert Talma & the Negroes also contributed to Schaamte en woede ("Shame and Anger"), a charity compilation, with the song "Datst du net mear bestiest."

On 11 January 2006 Iemand moet het doen ("Somebody Has to Do It") opened at the Grand Theatre in Groningen. It was the first theater show that Meindert Talma & the Negroes performed under their own name. Together with media artist Jan Klug, the band played out a filmic love story.

In December 2006, album number six, Nu geloof ik wat er in de Bijbel staat ("Now I Believe what the Bible Told", was released on Excelsior Recordings. The album, whose title is a line from the song "See That My Grave Is Kept Clean", was recorded in a little abandoned church in Drachtster Compagnie and consisted of Dutch-language reworkings of old American folk traditionals. Meindert Talma selected 9 songs of the Anthology of American Folk Music by Harry Smith and made these his own. Coinciding with the album release, the band celebrates ten years of Meindert Talma & the Negroes at Vera in Groningen.
