= Interactive Awards =

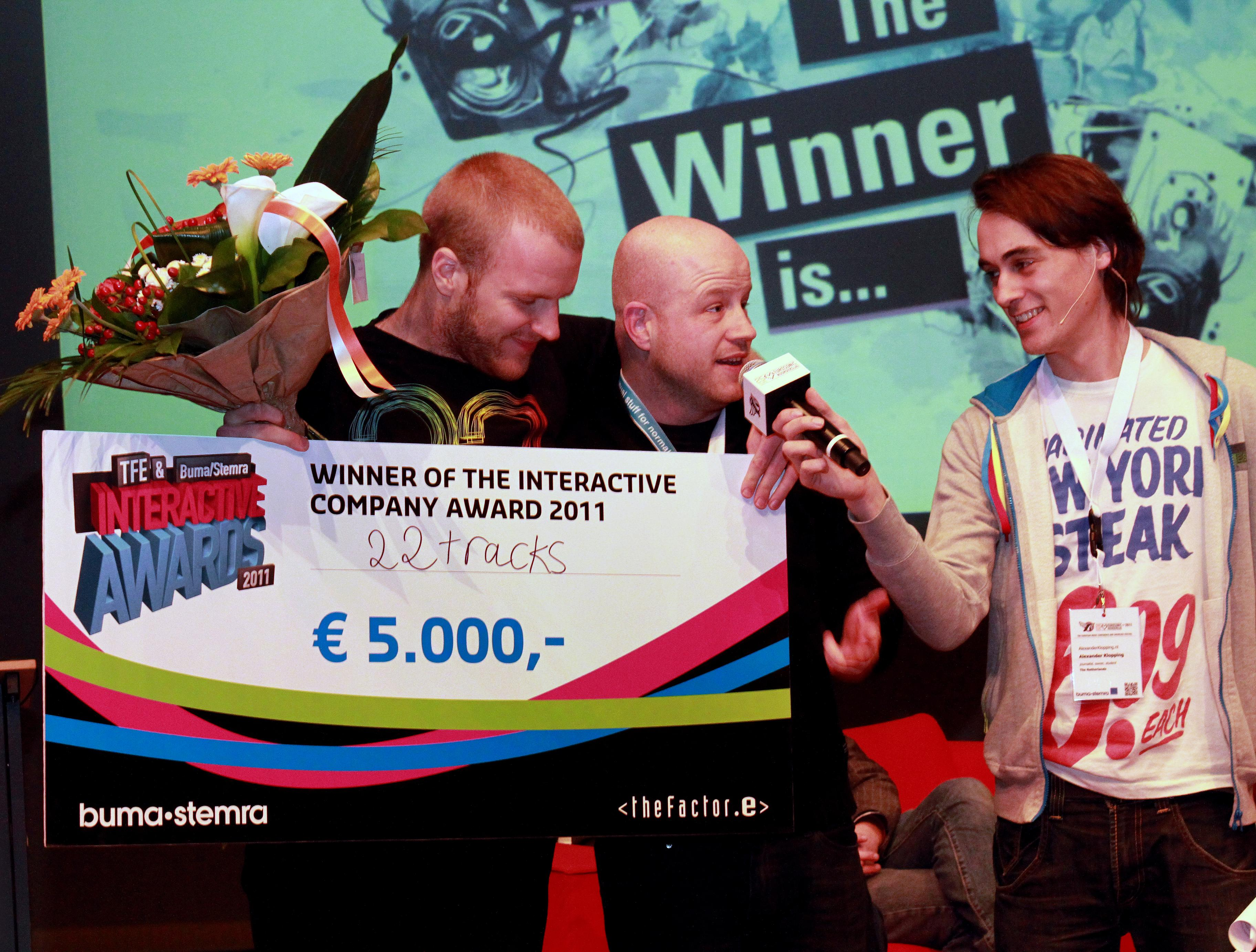
22tracks wins The Interactive Company Award 2011 - by Jack Tillmanns - Foto Focus

The Interactive Awards are awarded to artists, bands and music organizations that use the internet in an inventive way to market (their) music. Since 2008 the Interactive Awards are presented on an annual basis during The European Music Conference and Showcase Festival Eurosonic Noorderslag in the Dutch city of Groningen. The award aims to encourage European talent and highlight artists and bands that inspire others in an interactive field. Two awards are presented at the Interactive Awards, namely the Company Award and the Artist Award. The Artist Award aims to highlight artists or bands with special online initiatives. The prize includes a gift of 5000 euros. The Company Award was introduced to support online (music) portals and was added to the Interactive Awards in 2010. The Interactive Awards are an initiative of internet agency theFactor.e and Dutch Music rights Foundation Buma/Stemra. The Interactive Awards are hosted by Eurosonic Noorderslag.

== Winners ==
2011

- Artist Award: Palomine
- Company Award: 22tracks

2010

- Artist Award: Krause
- Company Award: Sellaband

2009

- Artist Award: Silence is Sexy

2008

- Artist Award: VanKatoen
