= Wende (singer) =

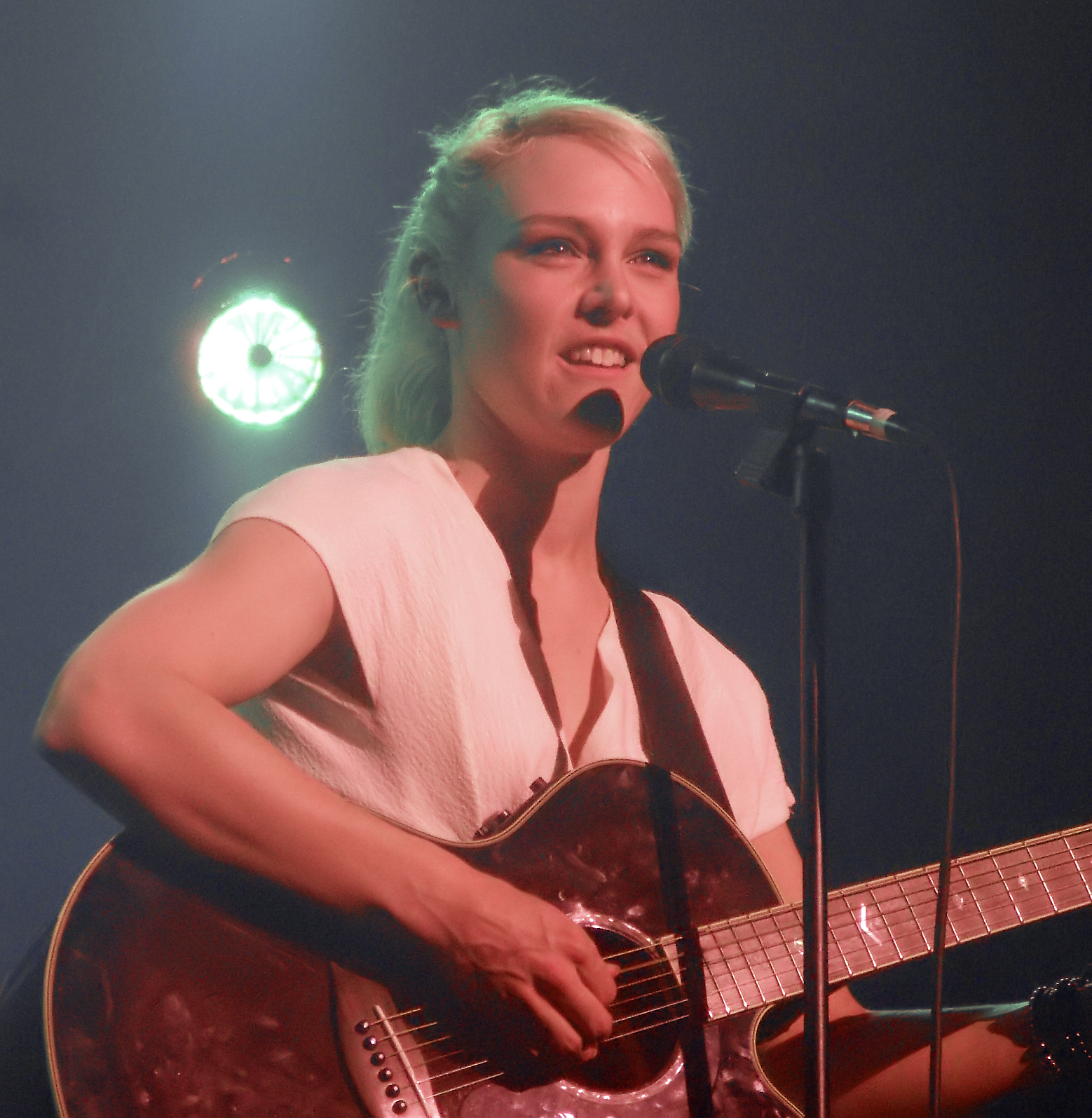
- Wende Snijders in 2009

Background information
- Born: Wende Snijders; 10 October 1978 (age 47); Beckenham, England
- Years active: 1990s – present
- Website: wende.nu

Wende Snijders, known mononymously as Wende (born 10 October 1978 in Beckenham, Greater London) is a Dutch singer.

== Biography ==
Wende moved to Indonesia when she was four years old and to Guinea-Bissau when she was six. When she was nine, she went to the Netherlands, where she lived in Zeist. She graduated from vwo and went to the Academie voor Kleinkunst where she graduated in 2002. She specialized in singing French chansons.

In 2001 she won first prize and the audience award of the Concours de la Chanson, which was held in De Kleine Komedie in Amsterdam and organized by Alliance Française. Her first album Quand tu dors was released in 2005 and won an Edison Award in the category Easy Listening/Cabaret. She also won in 2005 the Zonta-Award (a prize for talented woman artists younger than 30) and the BAT prize (potential theatre talent). For the DVD Au suivant she received an Edison in 2006 in the category National Music DVD. The corresponding cd was nominated for an Edison in the category Listening song/Cabaret.

Her second album La Fille Noyée was released in 2006. Contrary to the previous album, this album did not contain merely French chansons, but also songs in Dutch. This album also won an Edison in 2007.

In 2007 she performed with Jenny Arean -among others- in the play Het Verschil (The Difference). There is a limited edition of this play on CD. On 22 March she sang with the Hungarian artist Yonderboi for the Dutch queen during the celebration of 50 years of European collaboration. She also won the Gouden Notenkraker in 2007.

On 25 August 2007 her act at the annual Uitmarkt in Amsterdam was live on Dutch television. In the season 2007/08 she toured with her new show "Adem" (Breath), which she presented at the Oerol festival.

On 7 November 2007 she won another Edison, this time the Edison Jazz Award.

On 27 April 2008 Wende received the Annie M.G. Schmidt Prize for her theatre song De Wereld Beweegt (The World is Moving).

On 16 September 2008 she received a gold album for her second CD in the popular Dutch talkshow De Wereld Draait Door.

In 2024, Wende presented her show "The Promise" at the Adelaide Festival and the Hong Kong Arts Festival.

== Discography ==
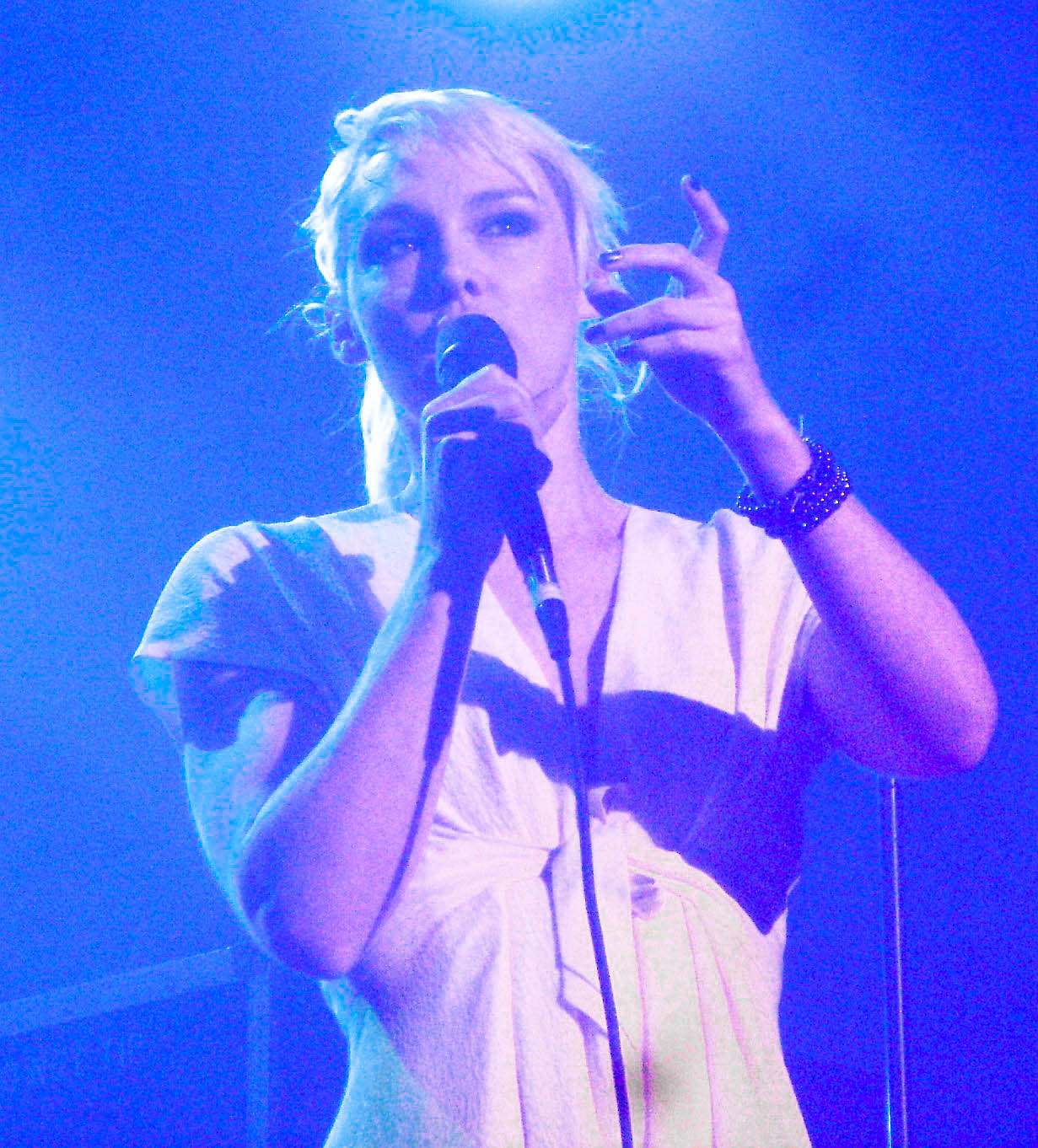
Wende Snijders

=== Albums ===
- Quand tu dors 2004
- La fille noyée 2006
- De Liedjes uit Het Verschil 2007
- Chante! 2008 CD+DVD
- No. 9 2009
- Carré 2011 Live CD
- Last Resistance 2013
- MENS 2018
- Sterrenlopen 2023

=== Singles ===
- La Vie en Rose 2004 (Promotion of the magazine with the same name)
- Alleen De Wind Weet 2007
- Roses in June 2009

=== DVDs ===
- Au Suivant 2005 (with bonus cd)
- De Wereld Beweegt 2008 (documentary of Roel van Dalen about Wende)
