= Room Eleven =

Dutch band

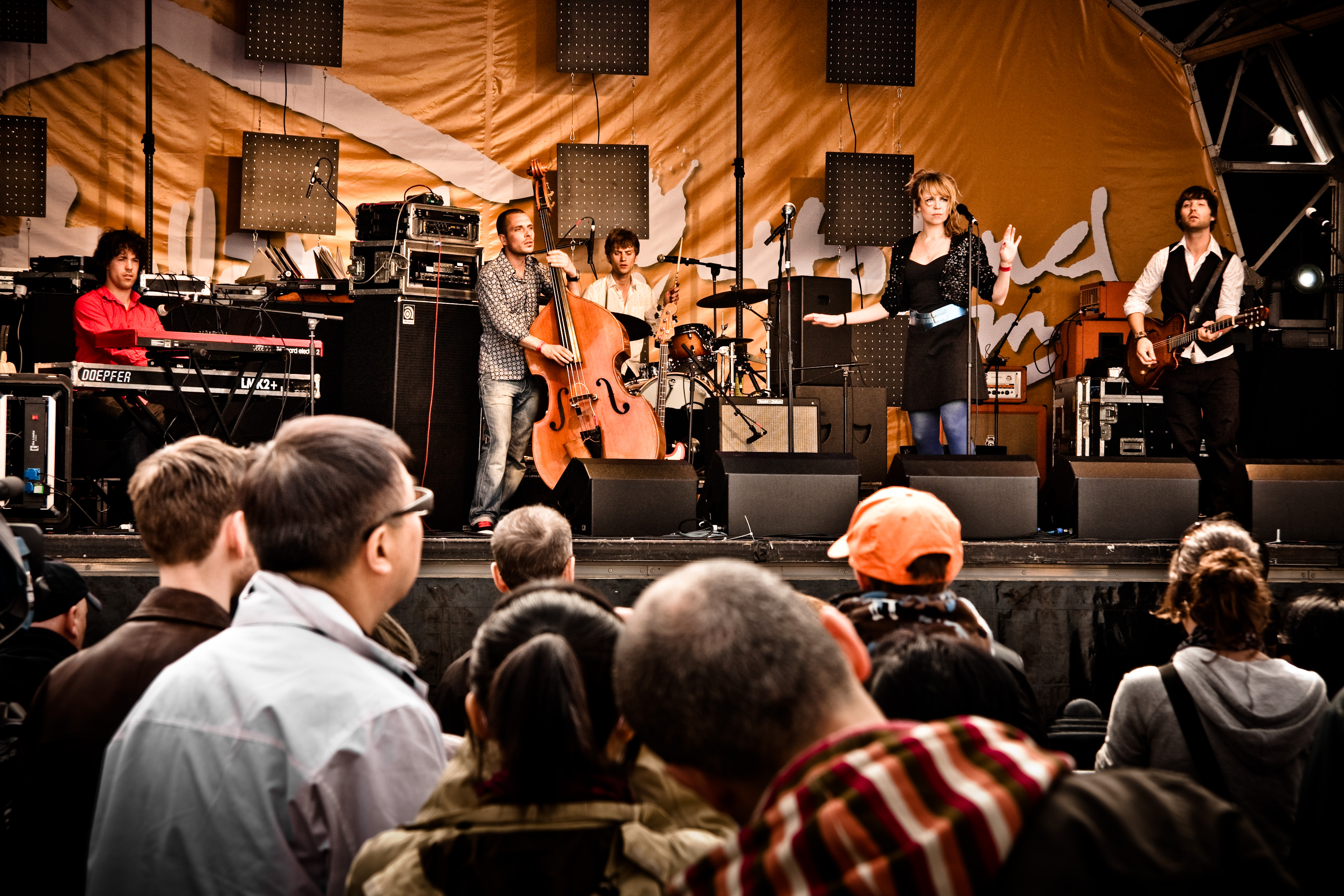

Background information
- Origin: Utrecht, Netherlands
- Genres: Jazz, blues, folk, bossa nova, pop
- Years active: 2004–2009
- Label: Universal Music (2006–2009)
- Members: Janne Schra (lead vocals); Arriën Molema (guitar); Tony Roe (keyboards); Lucas Dols (bass); Maarten Molema (drums)
- Website: roomeleven.nl

Room Eleven was a Dutch band, active from 2004 to 2009. Several members continued as Schradinova.

== History ==
Room Eleven saw its origins in 2001, when lead singer Janne Schra (born Janneke Maria Ali Schra) posted a note on Utrecht's Music College's message board seeking someone to write songs with. Arriën Molema responded, and they started writing music together.

In August 2004, Tony Roe, Lucas Dols and Maarten Molema joined the group on keyboard, double bass and drums, respectively. That same year they played at Amsterdam's Uitmarkt.

Their debut album, produced by Floris Klinkert and Room Eleven, was called Six White Russians and a Pink Pussycat and was released in June 2006. It was re-released in early 2007 with an additional bonus disc containing two cover versions of the song "Bitch", a new song called "Gray" and live versions of "Greenest Grass", "Sad Song" and "Come Closer". It went platinum.

In the summers of 2007 and 2009, they were invited to perform at the Montreal International Jazz Festival.

In April 2008, they released their second album, Mmm... Gumbo?, featuring the string quartet ETHEL, which became a gold disc.

In spite of having had five hits, Room Eleven split up in December 2009, announcing on their website that they

"had decided to take a break, but it soon became clear that our ambitions were too different and it didn't feel as exciting as before. The chemistry and excitement we felt before on stage and in the studio was suddenly gone."

== Schradinova ==
Schra, Dols, and Roe continued, together with Philippe Lemm, Sietse van Gorkum, and Stef van Es, as a new band, called "Schradinova". Their first album, India Lima Oscar Victor Echo You, was released in October 2010. Two singles, "Glowing" and "Dogs Bark", failed to become big hits.

== Discography ==
Studio albums

- Six White Russians and a Pink Pussycat (2006)
- Mmm... Gumbo? (2008)

Live albums

- Live in Carré (2009)

Singles

- Come Closer (2007)

== Gallery ==
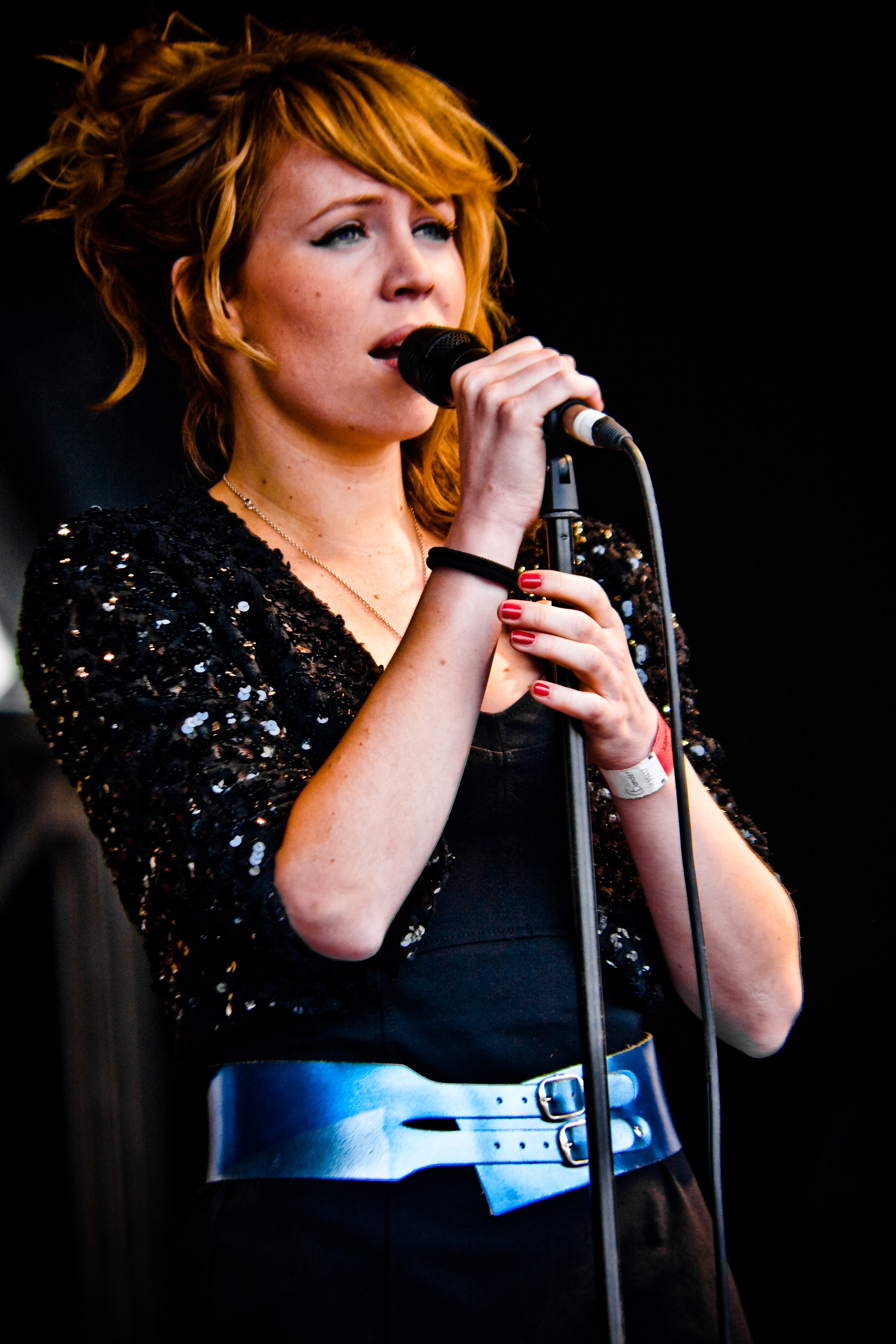
Janne Schra

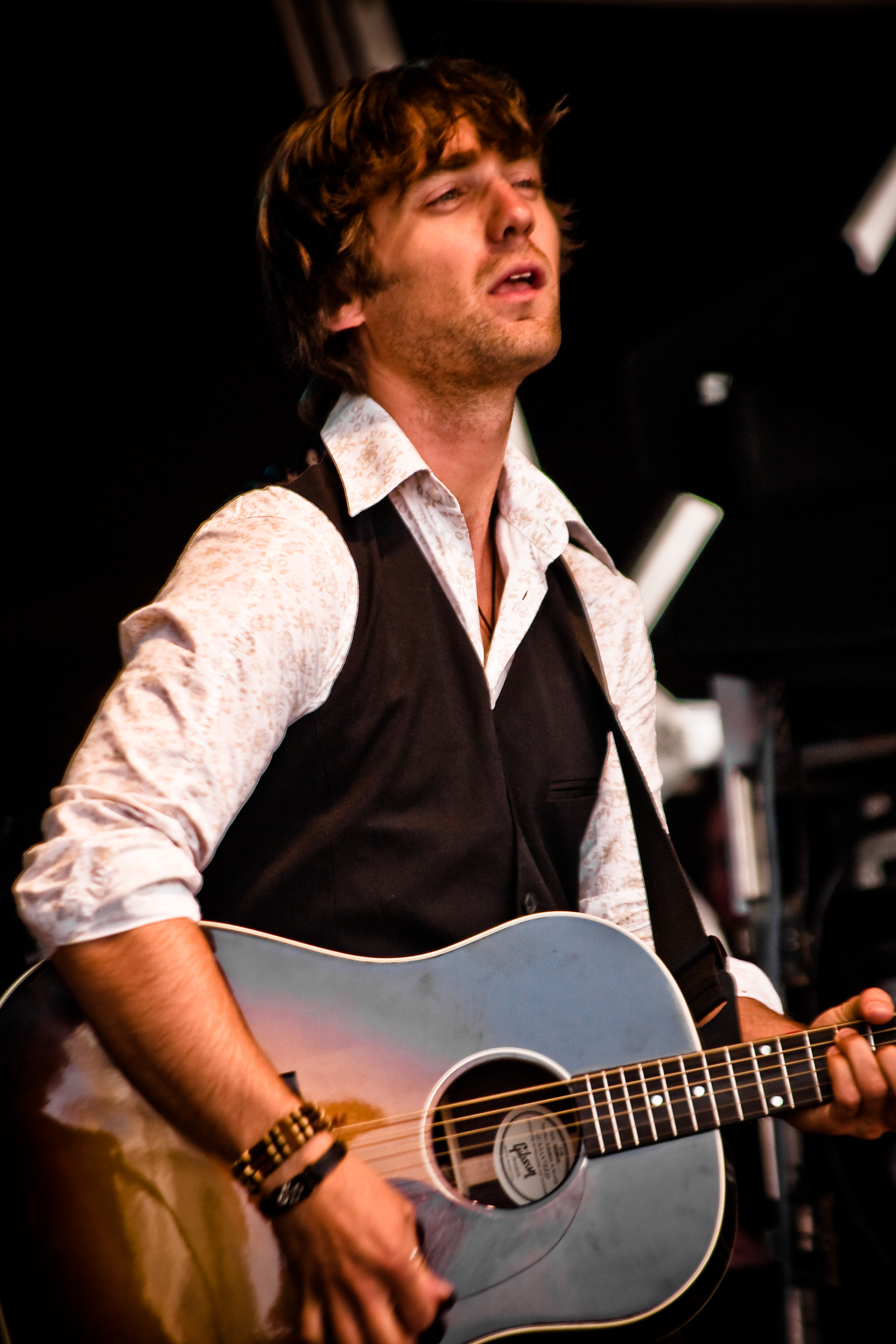
Arrien Molema

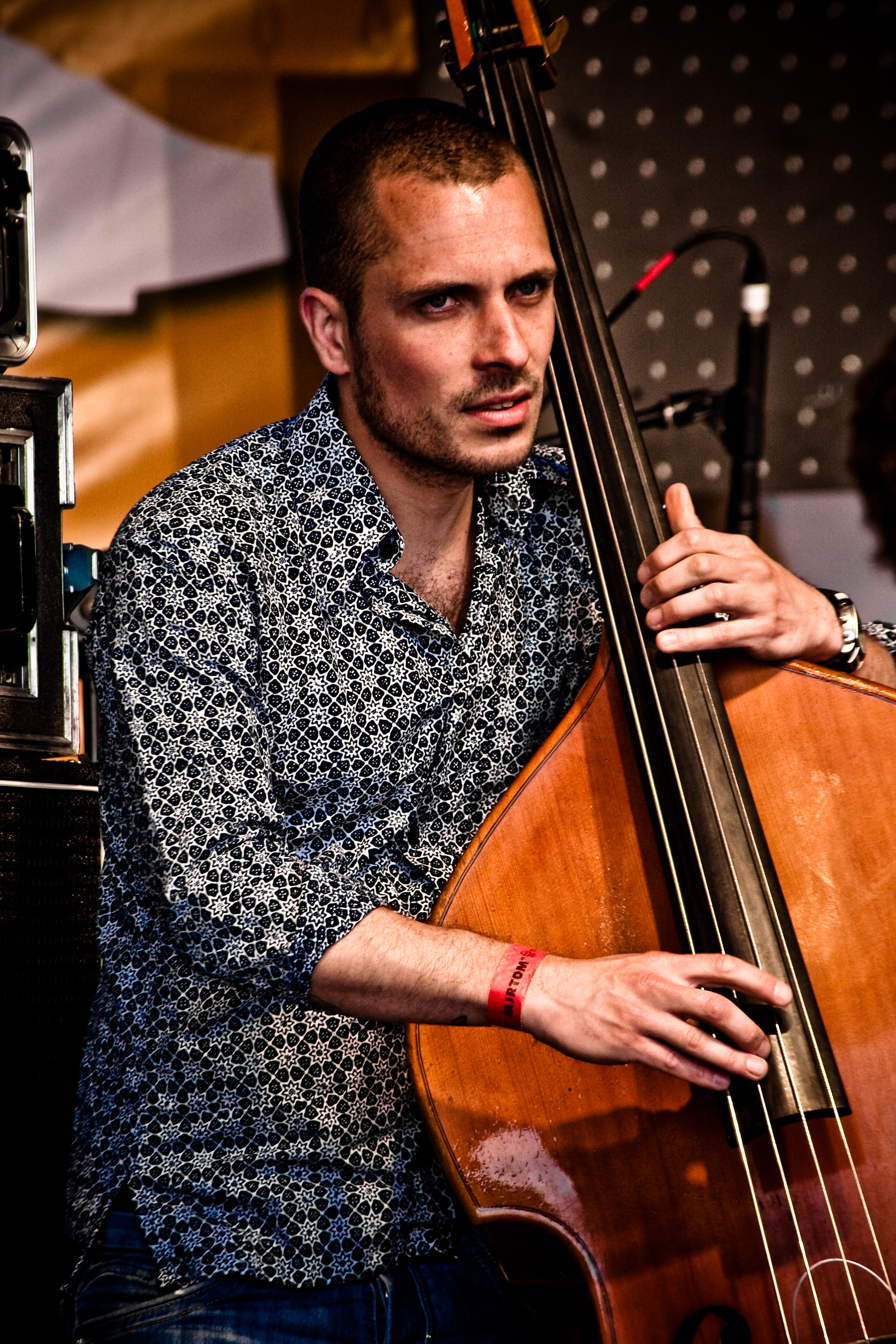
Lucas Dols

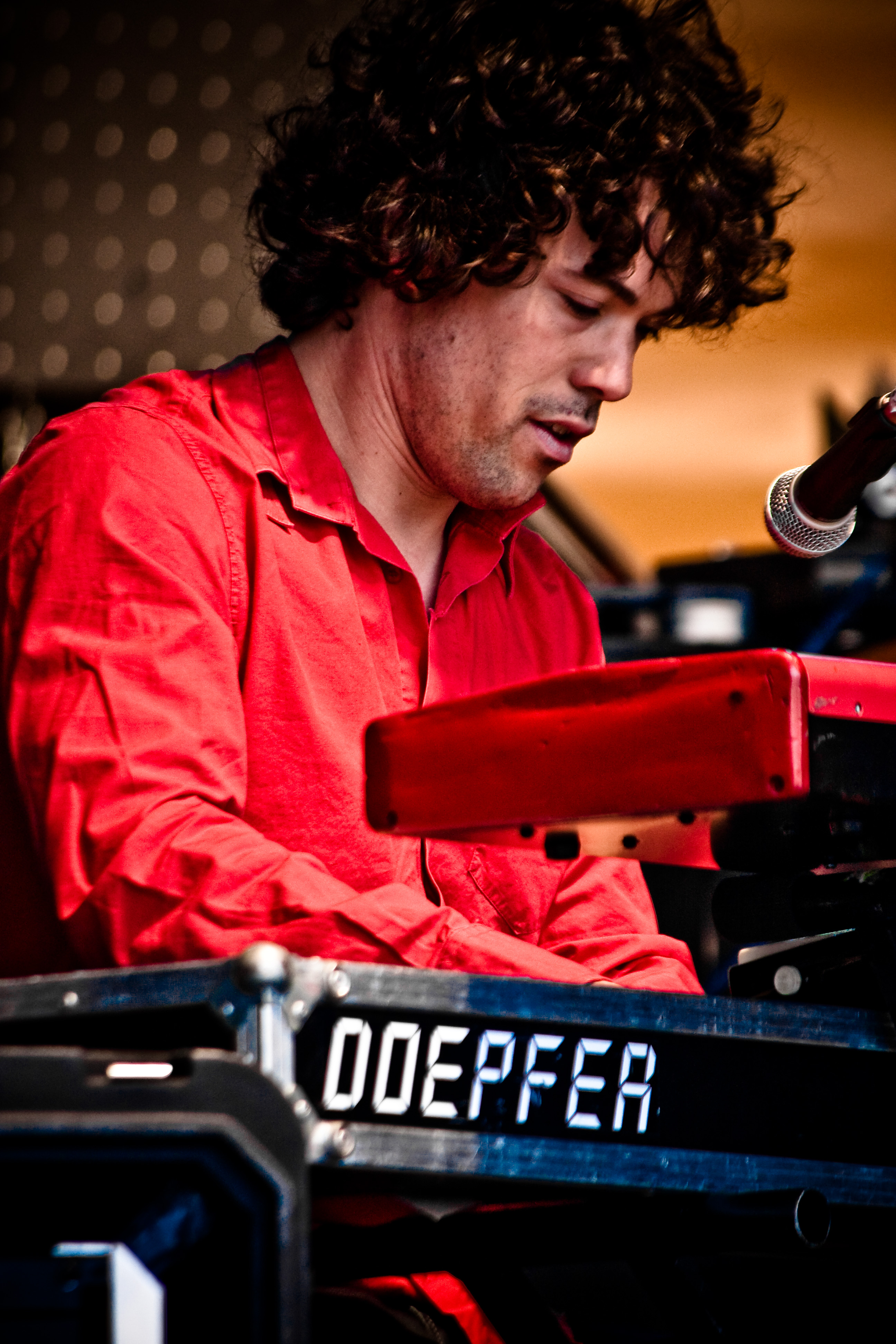
Tony Roe

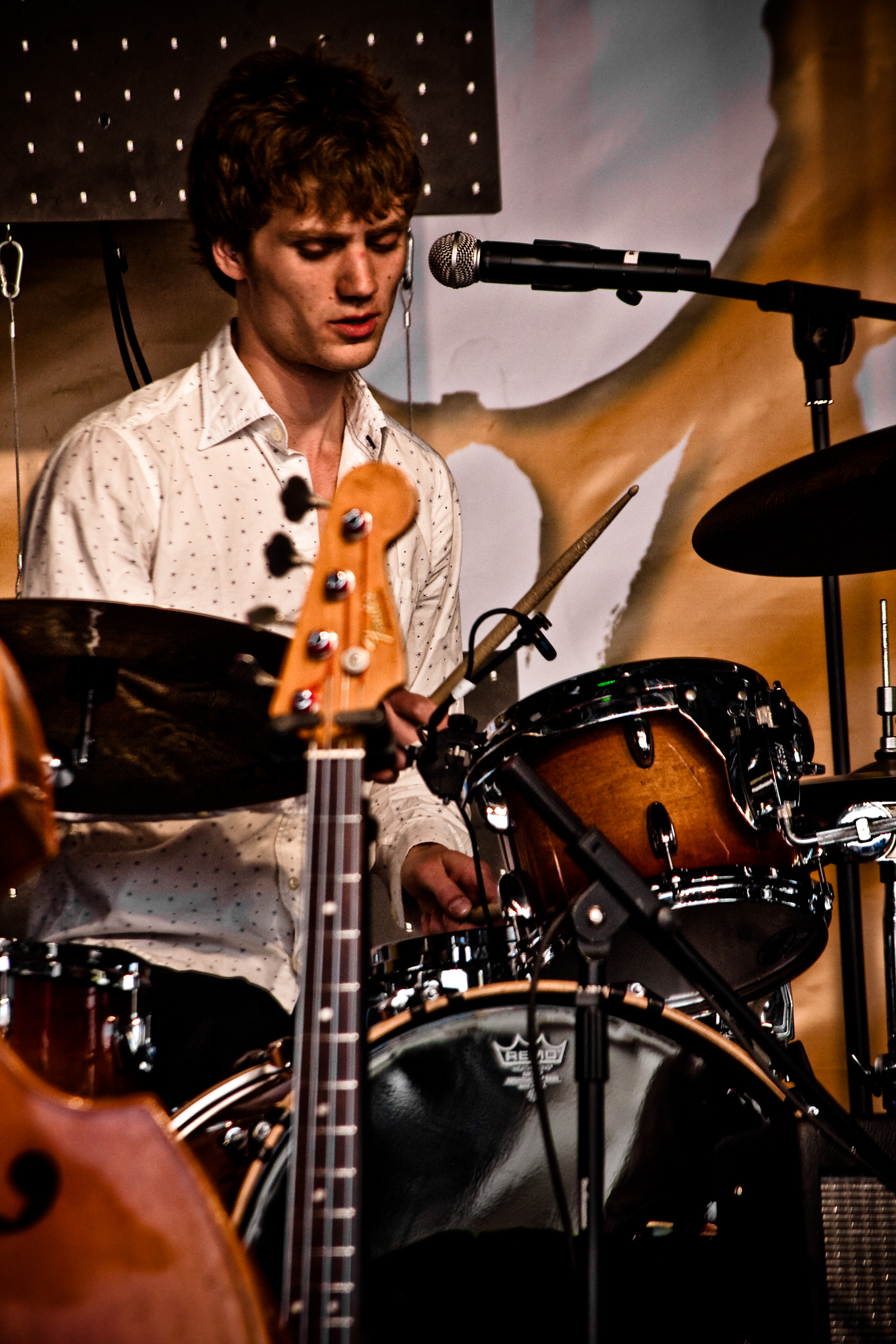
Maarten Molema
