= Coparck =

Dutch indie rock band

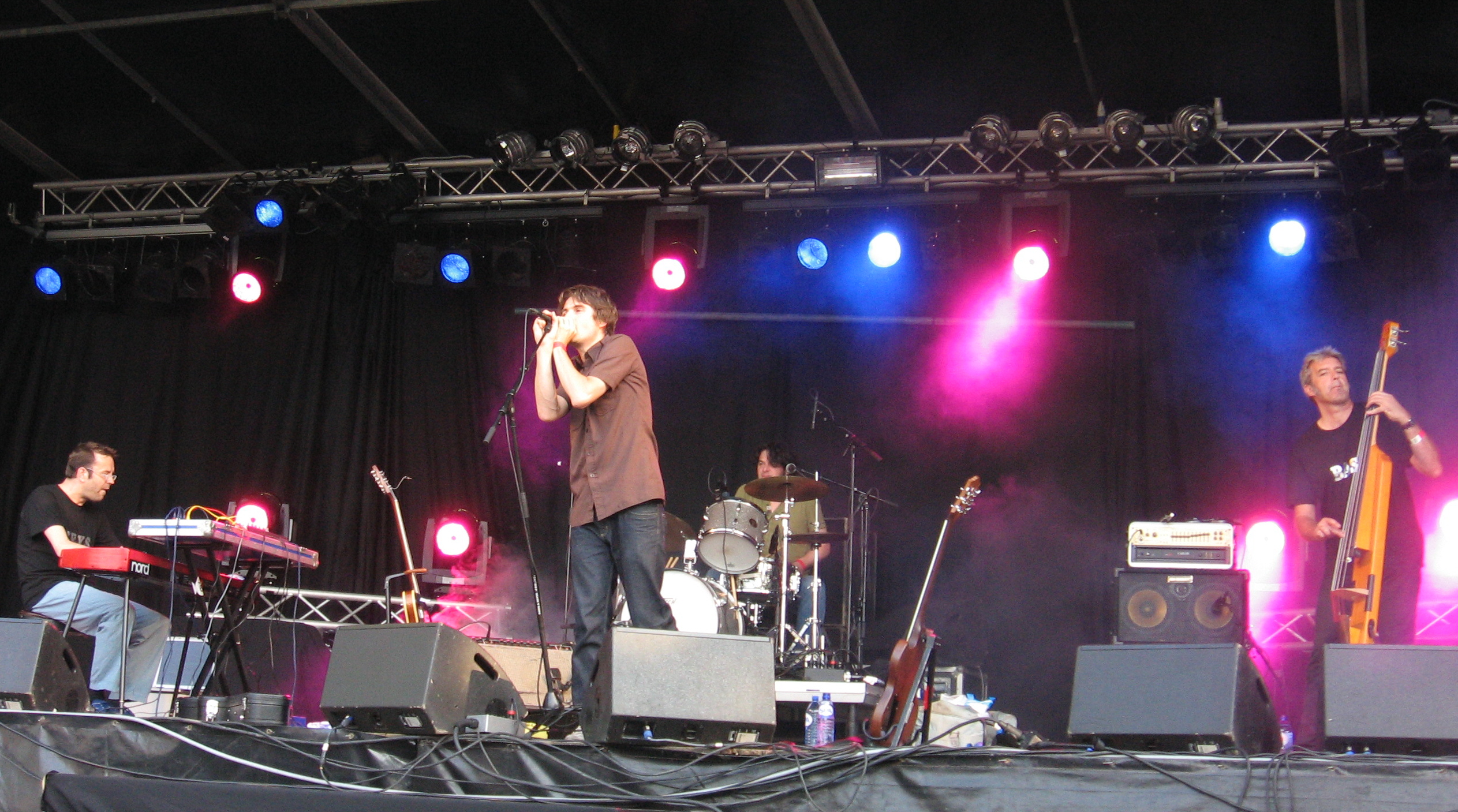
Coparck at Westerpop 2007

Coparck is a Dutch indie rock band from Amsterdam. They were active from 1999 until 2010.

== Biography ==
1999 marks the beginning of Coparck, with Odilo Girod (vocals and guitar), Maurits de Lange (piano), Rik Hansen (bass) and Mark van der Driest (drums). After several demos their debut album, named Birds, Happiness & Still Not Worried, was released in 2001. It is a collection of samples and new songs which they recorded themselves. It was well received by music critics, and a performance at Lowlands followed. The single "Into Routine" was the most successful, partly due to the music video. After its success in the Netherlands, the album was released in Europe and Japan.

In 2005 their second album came out, called Few Chances Come Once In A Lifetime, with new drummer Marcel van As and again self-produced. The song "The World of Tomorrow" became well known because it was used in a TV commercial. The music video received worldwide approval on independent film festivals.

In January 2007 their third album was released, called The 3rd Album. For the first time they used a producer, Reyn Ouwehand. The two music videos made were "A Good Year for the Robots" and "Thoughts You Thought You Could Do without".

In 2008 they focused on some other projects: musical scores for a film and a documentary, they toured with a theatre project Celluloid Fever, the Goddess about Rita Hayworth, and frontman Odilo Girod released a solo album called Chop Wood, recorded in Berlin.

In 2010 the band broke up.

They reunited in 2026.

== Band members ==
Coparck consists of:

- Odilo Girod - vocals, guitar,
- Maurits de Lange - piano, synths, beats&sounds
- Rik Hansen - bass, backing vocals
- Marcel van As - drums, beats&sounds, backing vocals

== Discography ==
- Birds, Happiness & Still not Worried (2001)
- Few Chances Come Once in a Lifetime (2005) #98
- The 3rd Album (2007) #58
- A Dog and Pony Show (2009) #43
