= The Wounded (band) =

Dutch rock band

- Origin: Emmen, Netherlands
- Genres: Gothic rock, gothic metal, doom metal, dark wave
- Years active: 1998–present
- Members: Marco van der Velde; Andy Haandrikman; Harold Feringa; Peter Deddens
- Past members: Alwin Schnoing; Nick Brockman; Ralph de Vries; Edwin Pol; Jonne Ziengs; Erwin de Jong; Eduard Dresscher; Harald de Haan; Marcel Ensing
- Website: http://www.the-wounded.nl

The Wounded is a Dutch Melancholic rock band from Emmen in the province of Drenthe, in the north of the Netherlands. They play a style of music that is variously described as Melancholic rock, Doom rock, Doom metal and Dark wave. They are often compared to bands like Type O Negative, Paradise Lost, Katatonia, Anathema and The Cure.

== History ==
In 2000, after winning different Dutch pop and band contests, the Wounded released their debut album, The Art of Grief, album with a sound influenced by doom, the classic gothic and new wave sound.

It was followed in March 2002 by their second album, Monument. On Monument the so-called "grunts" were gone, and musically there were more influences of symphonic rock and post-rock.

Shortly after the release of the album, the Wounded changed their line-up. The only two original members, bass player Andy Haandrikman and singer-guitarist Marco van der Velde, searched for new musicians. After auditioning several musicians, they found a new drummer, lead-guitar player, and synth-player: Alwin Schnoing, Sander Wessels, and Eduard Dresscher.

Monument was promoted with several performances in the Netherlands, Germany, and Belgium.

The Wounded released their third album, Atlantic in early 2004 on Coldblood Industries' sub-label Ebony Tears. With influences of Marillion and Pink Floyd to their own typical sound this album was very well received by the European press, ending up in different underground and mainstream top charts in different magazines and radio charts. Another tour of gigs in Europe started. Playing in venues and festivals with bands like Paradise lost, Tiamat, HIM, Anathema a.o.

In August 2016 the Wounded announced the completion of their fourth album, Sunset, which was released in October 2016. It contained nine songs with a running time of over one hour. The artwork for the album was made by Regina Boersma who also made the artwork for Monument and Atlantic.

After the release of Sunset the band played at different venues and festivals in Europe gaining a lot of loyal support.

In 2018 the first three albums were remastered and released by the band itself.

In Silence was released shortly after the remasters as a compilation of rerecorded songs that were released before on the first four albums. It contained electronical and orchestral versions of "Wolves We Raised", "Monument", "Red", "This Paradise", and many more.

After a period of writing the band again changed their line-up. Sander Wessels, Erwin de Jong, and Marcel Ensing all left the band because of different reasons, but mostly because of differences in opinions about the band's future. The band decided to move on without a keyboard player and they found Harold Feringa as a new lead guitarist.

In 2023 the band started to record new songs with producer Frans Vollink.

While working on the new album drummer Alwin Schnoing died. The band, after taking a break, decided to move on and changed their name unofficially to Wounded (without "The").

In September 2023 the mini-album The Sky Is Yours was released, with six songs containing tales of historical persons and happenings. The Sky Is Yours is the first of two albums. The second, The Sky Is Ours, a full-length album, was released on 1 December that same year.

== Band members ==
Current line-up

- Peter Deddens – drums (2023–present)
- Andy Haandrikman – bass guitar (1998–present)
- Marco van der Velde – vocals, guitar, keys (1998–present)
- Harold Feringa – lead guitars (2023–present)

Former members

- Nick Brockman – bass guitar
- Ralph de Vries – drums (1998–2002)
- Edwin Pol – guitars (1998–2000)
- Jonne Ziengs – keyboards (1998–2002)
- Erwin de Jong – guitars (2000–2002)
- Harald de Haan – keyboards (2008–2017)
- Sander Wessels – guitar (2002–2019)
- Alwin Schnoing – drums (2003–2023)

== Discography ==
- 2000: The Art of Grief
- 2002: Monument
- 2004: Atlantic
- 2016: Sunset
- 2018: In Silence (compilation)
- 2023: The sky is yours
- 2023: The sky is ours
