= K-Liber =

Curaçao hip-hop group

K-Liber (also known as K-Liber 4 Life and occasionally capitalised as K-liber) are a Curaçao hip-hop group who have had some success in the Netherlands and, to an extent, other countries across Europe. Their single "Viben" was a top five hit in the Netherlands, and their follow-up "Loungen", featuring Michael Bryan, also had some success. Their newest release, "Springuuuhh", is also now beginning to receive promotion in various European countries. The single again features Bryan, along with MC Farah. In mid January 2012, the song "Het Is Tijd" will be included in the Zumba Fitness Meg Mix, Volume 27.
