= Web Fest =

- Current: 5th Web Fest Awards
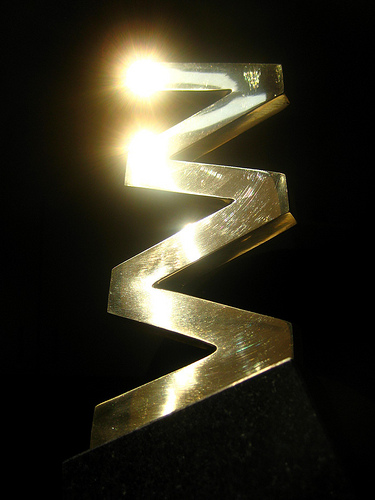
- Web Fest Statuette
- Awarded for: Excellence in internet achievements
- Country: Serbia
- Presented by: Web Fest llc
- First award: 2007
- Website: www.wfest.org

The Web Fest, are a set of awards given annually for excellence of internet achievements in the region of Former Yugoslavia. The Web Fest statuette is one of two types of Web Fest Awards. Organized and overseen by the Web Fest llc, the awards are given each year at a formal ceremony.

The awards were first given in 2007 at a ceremony created for the awards, at the Yugoslav Drama Theatre in Belgrade. Over the years that the award has been given, the categories presented have changed; currently Web Fest Awards are given in more than a dozen categories, and include awards for general contribution to the society. It is modeled after the Academy Award.

The 5th Web Fest Awards were held at the Atelje 212 on November 15, 2012.

== History ==
The first Web Fest was held on November 29, 2007 at Yugoslav Drama Theater when a group of internet enthusiasts and technology lovers from private company Agena llc decided to organize an Oscar style type of awards ceremony in order to and increase the awareness of the quality of work done on the Internet in the region of Former Yugoslavia as well as highlight the importance of daily usage of the Internet amongst the general public.

The only year Web Fest was not held was in 2008, allegedly due to a lack of sponsorship funding after the start of Global Recession. Since 2009 the Web Fest has been organized regularly while in 2011 and 2012 part of the festival was also a Web Fest Conference.

== Web Fest Statuette ==
=== Design ===
The design of the statuette follows the design of the official triple V logo of the festival. Triple V is made out of and placed on a black marble base. Each winner receives a single Web Fest Statuette.

As of 2010 there are two types of statuettes. One for the winners in the categories and one for the Web Fest Grand Prix winners. The original type of statuette on a black marble is given to the winners in the categories while the Grand Prix winners receive an updated version of the statuette with triple V sign made out of aluminium is placed on a white marble base. The Grand Prix Statuette is also larger.

== Awards ceremonies ==
The following is a listing of all Web Fest Awards ceremonies.

Ceremony	Date	Grand Prix General Public winner	Grand Prix Jury winner	Host(s)	Venue	
1st Web Fest Awards	November 29, 2007	—	—	Gordan Kicic, Ivana Jovanović	Yugoslav Drama Theatre	
2nd Web Fest Awards	November 26, 2009	—	—	Gordan Kicic, Ana Jovanović	Stari dvor	
3rd Web Fest Awards	November 25, 2010	Pouke.org	MTV.RS	Ivon Jafali, Srdjan Erceg	Studentski kulturni centar	
4th Web Fest Awards	November 24, 2011	dodirnime.com	Njuz.net	Maja Marković, Srdjan Erceg	Centar za kulturu Bozidarac	
5th Web Fest Awards	November 15, 2012	zokigames.net	Top Eleven Football Manager	Srdjan Erceg	Atelje 212	
Ceremony	Date	Grand Prix General Public winner	Grand Prix Jury winner	Host(s)	Atelje 212	Venue
