= Ghost Trucker =

Dutch rock band

- Origin: Amsterdam, Netherlands
- Genres: Alternative rock, electropop
- Years active: 2004 - 2006 (still active)
- Label: Excelsior Recordings
- Members: Asta Kat; Jelte van Andel; Ralph Mulder; Rik Elstgeest; Roald van Oosten

Ghost Trucker plays alternative rock music with electronic flourishes. The band consists of Roald van Oosten (Caesar), Asta Kat (Seesaw, Zoppo), Ralph Mulder (Alamo Race Track), Rik Elstgeest (Kopna Kopna) and Jelte van Andel. The band released one album, The Grand Mystique in 2006.

== History ==
In 2004 Van Oosten had already worked on numerous soundtrack projects. As Caesar decided to take an extended break he wanted to expand on the soundtrack music he had worked on previously. With these recordings in mind he started to write and record new material together with Kat, Mulder, Elstgeest.

Throughout a two year period, from 2004 to 2006, the band recorded in Van Oosten’s Animal Kingdom studio in Amsterdam. Which resulted in the release of The Grand Mystique in September 2006, on Mulder and Van Oosten’s resident label Excelsior Recordings. A review in NRC Handelsblad said that "The Grand Mystique is a musical adventure. The long list of musicians who also contributed, from steel-guitar to drum samples, together made for a beautiful whole of twinkling songs." A review of the album in De Groene Amsterdammer stated that "Where the first song, Lost in Space, is inspired by Gary Numan, the band with a song like Lost Girl switches just as easily to ominous rock in the line of Velvet Underground."

In December 2006 the band tours as part of the Fine Fine Music tour. Together with labelmates Alamo Race Track, Spinvis, Do-The-Undo and El Pino & the Volunteers the band visits numerous venues in the Netherlands.

== Discography ==
- The Grand Mystique (2006)
