= Alamo Race Track =

Dutch rock band

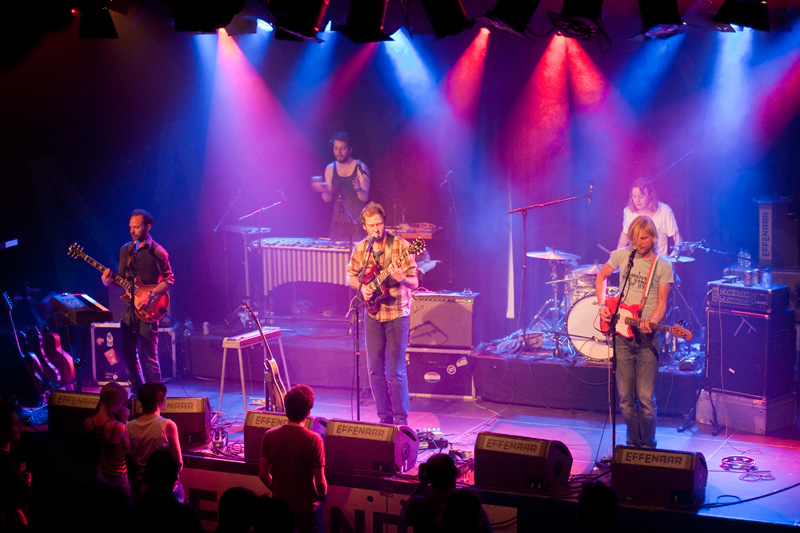
- Alamo Race Track. 6 May 2011

Background information
- Origin: Amsterdam, Netherlands
- Genres: Alternative rock
- Years active: 2001–present
- Label: Excelsior Recordings
- Members: Jaap Bossen; Robin Buijs; Peter Akkerman; Len Lucieer; Ralph Mulder
- Website: Official website

Alamo Race Track is a rock band from Amsterdam, Netherlands. They have released five full-length albums.

== History ==
=== Early days (2001–2002) ===
In 2001 the band Redivider lost keyboard player Diederik Nomden. The remaining members began what is now known as Alamo Race Track. They felt that Nomden's departure affected the band's sound, so they took on a new band name, Alamo Race Track. Under this name, David Corel, Guy Bours, Len Lucieer and Ralph Mulder started to record new demo tracks.

After supporting Daryll-Ann on a tour in early 2002, Excelsior Recordings signed the band. The following year the band played many high-profile shows, resulting in good reviews from various Dutch magazines.

=== Birds At Home (2003–2005) ===
After completing several side projects, playing with Daryll-Ann and Bram Vermeulen, the members got back together in early 2003. Together with producer Frans Hagenaars the band recorded the tracks for their debut album, Birds At Home. These Sessions took place in Hagenaars' studio in Weesp. The album was completed in June of that year.

Birds At Home was released in the Netherlands on September 1, 2003. The album became a moderate success in the Dutch pop music charts.

The band plays a number of prestigious festivals in the Netherlands such as Noorderslag, The Music in My Head and Lowlands in 2003. In addition, Alamo Race Track visits England, playing at The City in Manchester and during the MusicWork showcase in Glasgow.

While playing at the South by South West festival in Austin, Texas the band was noticed by a representative of Fargo Records. This meeting leads to a licensing deal for France. Birds At Home was released in France in early 2005. Following this, the band toured France in June. The band's popularity in France exceeds that of the Netherlands.

=== Black Cat John Brown (2006–2009) ===
In mid-2006 the band began recording Black Cat John Brown. During this time, a dressing room performance of the song Black Cat John Brown found its way on to YouTube. Within two weeks the song was viewed by more than 541,000 people. This success translated into widespread media exposure in the Netherlands.

When the album was released in October it was received well amongst press and record buying audience. Black Cat John Brown reaches the number one spot in the Scherpe Rand Van Platenland, an alternative music chart in the Netherlands.

In December the band toured as part of the Fine Fine Music tour. Together with labelmates Ghost Trucker, Spinvis, Do-The-Undo and El Pino & the Volunteers the band visited numerous venues in the Netherlands.

The band opened 2007 with a show at the Noorderslag festival in Groningen. In early January the band also recorded a video for the song Northern Territory.

After the Noorderslag show on January 13 the rest of January and February were dedicated to touring abroad. Alamo Race Track plays at the De Nachten festival in Antwerp and follows this up with a three-week streak of shows in France. The tour was a great success as almost all venues were sold out.

=== Unicorn Loves Deer (2010–2014) ===
After Black Cat John Brown, the line-up changed dramatically. David Corel and Guy Bours left the group, to be replaced with Jelte van Andel (bass) and Robin Buijs (drums). In early 2010 the band announced a new tour. With the premiere of the soundtrack to a theatrical work by director Jakop Ahlbom on February 12. They composed music especially for the play and performed the music live on stage. The pieces from the show during and after the tour formed the basis for Alamo Race Track's third album Unicorn Loves Deer.

=== Hawks (2015–present) ===
In March 2015, the band's fourth album was released with tour dates announced in The Netherlands and Belgium

In 2019 Alamo Race Track will be providing the music to the slapstick comedy play, Lebensraum, by the Jakop Ahlbom Company

In 2023, after a long hiatus, the band's fifth album Greetings from Tear Valley and the Diamond Ae was released.

== Discography ==
- Birds At Home - 2003
- Black Cat John Brown - 2006
- Unicorn Loves Deer - 2011
- Hawks - 2015
- Greetings from Tear Valley and the Diamond Ae - 2023
