= 12.5 Years, 3 Albums, 36 Songs =

Box set by Johan
- Released: 2009
- Genre: pop, indie rock
- Length: 2:10:43
- Label: Excelsior

12.5 Years, 3 Albums, 36 Songs is a compilation album by Dutch rock band Johan. It includes remasters of the first three albums the band has released, Johan, Pergola, and THX JHN, as well as a DVD with the band's seven music videos.

== Track listing ==
Disc one: Johan

No.	Title	Length
1.	"Everybody Knows"	3:23
2.	"Not Funny Anymore (It's)"	2:37
3.	"Back In School"	2:19
4.	"Payment"	3:16
5.	"It's Five O'clock"	4:35
6.	"Easy (It's)"	3:10
7.	"Suffer Baby"	3:17
8.	"Life on Mars"	3:10
9.	"December"	3:03
10.	"Porneaux"	3:49
11.	"Swing"	4:06
12.	"He's Not There"	3:42
13.	"Brown Mice"	7:28
Total length:		48:01

Disc two: Pergola

No.	Title	Length
1.	"Tumble and Fall"	3:28
2.	"Pergola"	3:28
3.	"I Mean I Guess"	2:52
4.	"Tomorrow"	3:36
5.	"Day Is Done"	4:18
6.	"I Feel Fine"	2:06
7.	"Paper Planes"	2:48
8.	"Save Game"	3:01
9.	"How Does It Feel"	3:33
10.	"Why_Cp"	3:05
11.	"Time and Time Again"	3:51
12.	"Here"	4:05
Total length:		40:17
