= Daryll-Ann =

Dutch rock band

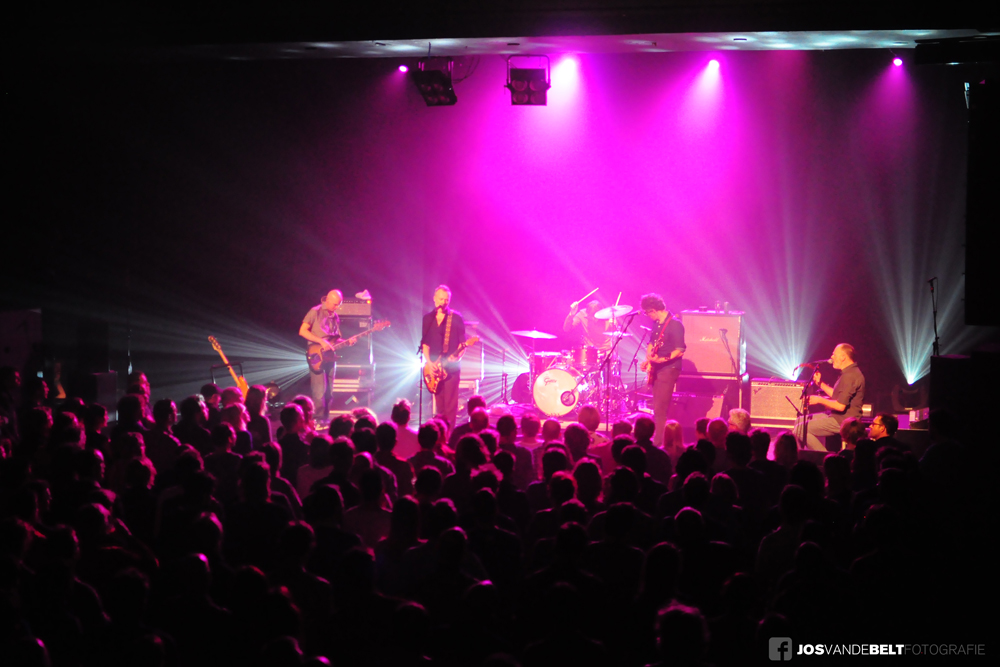
- Daryll-Ann band in 2013 in a live Concert

Background information
- Origin: Ermelo, Netherlands
- Genre: Alternative rock
- Years active: 1988–2004
- Label: Excelsior Recordings
- Members: Anne Soldaat; Coen Paulusma; Jeroen Vos; Jelle Paulusma; Jeroen Kleijn
- Past members: Frank van der Bij; Dick Brouwers
- Website: Official website

Daryll-Ann is a Dutch rock band from Ermelo, Netherlands. Between 1992 and 2004 the band released six studio albums, plus one live album. Daryll-Ann was the first signing of Dutch label Excelsior Recordings.

== History ==
=== Early days (1988–1991) ===
In the summer break of 1988 four high school students – Jelle and Coen Paulusma, Jeroen Vos and Frank van der Bij – decided to form a band. Before long Anne Soldaat joined and rounded out the line-up. They took the name Daryll-Ann, based on a character from the American television show Hill Street Blues. At this stage the band drew its influences from punk records and songs by The Cure.

After the band members graduated from high school, three of them separately moved to Utrecht and Amsterdam to continue their studies. Still the band managed to record a first EP on the small Kelt label. It was received well by various music reviewers.

=== Renko (1992) ===
In 1992 the band played at the Noorderslag festival in Groningen, an important showcase for new talent. Later that year their debut album Renko was released on the Solid label. Like the band's name, the album's name is based on a Hill Street Blues character.

=== Hut Records (1993–1995) ===
A representative of Hut Records heard a Daryll-Ann demo and saif that the label was interested in signing the band. However, the label, a sublabel of Virgin Records, faced objection from Solid, with whom the band was still under contract. After a lengthy dispute, an agreement was reached, and Daryll-Ann signed to Hut Records.

The first result of this new partnership was the EP I Could Never Love You. This was the first time that drummer Jeroen Kleijn recorded with the band. In 1994, I Could Never Love You was released in both the Netherlands and the UK. The British press was very enthusiastic about the EP, and Melody Maker even proclaimed it single of the week.

Daryll-Ann played the two biggest festivals in the Netherlands, Pinkpop and Lowlands. The band also played many shows in the UK, including concerts with The Smashing Pumpkins, The Verve and Cracker.

Hut Records, convinced of the band's potential, budgeted 50 thousand euro for the recording of their album. The band recorded at Studio Sound Enterprise, with Frans Hagenaars as producer. When the CD Seaborne West was released in 1995, it received rave reviews from both the Dutch and the British press. Melody Maker again declared a Daryll-Ann song single of the week, this time "Stay". The band undertook an extensive European tour with Bettie Serveert. In August, Seaborne West also got a US release. Although press reviews were positive, CD sales were disappointing. This, combined with the fact that Hut Records was in serious financial trouble, caused a discontinuation of the band's contract.

=== Excelsior Recordings (1996–2004) ===
The band did not have to wait long for a new record label, as manager Ferry Roseboom and producer Frans Hagenaars decided to form Excelsior Recordings in 1996. Daryll-Ann was one of the first bands to record for the label. Under the guidance of producer Hagenaars, the band created the Weeps album. It received very positive reviews, but it failed to sell, much to the disappointment of the band members.

In August, Daryll-Ann played at the Lowlands festival for a second time.

After a hiatus, the band returned for the Marlboro Flashback Tour in 1998, a special tour where Daryll-Ann covered a set of Byrds songs. The band initiated recording their next album, Happy Traum. Produced by Hagenaars, the album was released in 1999. Positive reviews followed, but a breakthrough still did not happen.

In 2000 the band submitted a track to the album Trillend Op Mijn Benen, a tribute to popular Dutch band Doe Maar. After that, the live album DA Live was released, a retrospective of ten years of Daryll-Ann. Bass player Jeroen Vos left, and was replaced by Dick Brouwers.

The next album, Trailer Tales, took a little more time to come around. By this time, Jelle Paulusma had taken the responsibility of group leader. He recorded a large portion of the songs by himself, and most of the tracks on the album were written by him. The album was named Trailer Tales as Paulusma composed most of the songs for the album in a secluded trailer caravan. When the album was released in 2002, it was seen as a departure from previous releases; nonetheless, its quality was praised by the press. There was a lot of media attention, but the sales numbers were not as high as hoped.

In late 2003, the band hired J.B. Meijers as the producer for their next studio album. He also assisted in songwriting, arranging and engineering. On February 16, 2004, the album Don't Stop was released. As opposed to Trailer Tales, this album sounded like a true band album again. An extensive tour followed, but on May 26, 2004, the band decided to quit. No specific reason was given. All remaining concert dates were canceled.

=== Post-Daryll-Ann ===
Until 2006, the band members were inactive. Jelle Paulusma released his first solo album under the moniker "Paulusma". Anne Soldaat assisted in producing GEM's second album, and released his first solo album under the moniker of "Do-The-Undo" in January 2007. His second solo album, In Another Life, was released in 2009. Along with touring with his own band, Soldaat toured with Tim Knol, whose debut self-titled album was released in January 2010. Both Soldaat and Jeroen Klein played on this album. Jeroen Kleijn plays the drums on the two albums by the band Johan: THX JHN and 4. He was also the drummer in the Dutch experimental band Spinvis. Currently he is the drummer for Claw Boys Claw.

=== Reunion ===
In August 2013 the band announced the plans for a new tour in 2014, to promote the reissues of their albums. The box set Daryll-Ann Again that was released in December 2013 contains all the albums of the band, with additional demo and rare recordings.

In 2024, the band released their first new album in 20 years, Spring.

== Band members ==
- Jelle Paulusma – vocals, guitar, keyboards
- Anne Soldaat – guitar, vocals
- Coen Paulusma – vocals (1988–1993, 1996–2004)
- Jeroen Vos – bass guitar (1988–2001)
- Dick Brouwers – bass guitar (2001–2004)
- Frank van der Bij – drums (1988–1993)
- Jeroen Kleijn – drums (1993–2004)

== Discography ==
- Renko (1992)
- I Could Never Love You (EP, 1994)
- Come Around (EP, 1994)
- Seaborne West (1995)
- Weeps (1996)
- Happy Traum (1999)
- DA Live (2000)
- Trailer Tales (2002)
- Don't Stop (2004)
- Spring (2024)
