= The Great Vacation =

2024 album by Johan

Studio album by Johan
- Released: 26 January 2024
- Genre: Pop; rock
- Length: 43:44
- Label: Excelsior

Johan chronology
Pull Up (2018)	The Great Vacation (2024)

Professional ratings
Review scores
Source	Rating
De Volkskrant	4/5 stars
Het Parool	(positive)

The Great Vacation is the sixth studio album by Dutch rock band Johan. It was released on 26 January 2024, and received good reviews by critics. Like all of Johan's music, it was released on the Excelsior Recordings label. The album was delayed numerous times due to the COVID-19 pandemic and then a glut of releases by the record label. The album was the first of the bands releases that wasn't exclusively written by Jacco de Greeuw. All songs were written by him and guitarist Robin Berlijn. The albums title also refers the period of the COVID-19 pandemic.

== Background ==
The Great Vacation is the sixth studio album released by Johan.

== Track listing ==
All tracks are written by Jacco de Greeuw and Robin Berlijn.

The Great Vacation track listing
No.	Title	Length
1.	"Cincinnati"	3:24
2.	"So It Goes"	2:50
3.	"Time for Change"	3:40
4.	"Fly on the Wall"	2:51
5.	"The Great Vacation"	3:27
6.	"A Thought"	3:10
7.	"Believe"	3:08
8.	"Undone"	3:51
9.	"Hold the Line"	3:06
10.	"I Don't Know Man"	3:45
11.	"Biker S."	2:11
12.	"Reset"	4:27
13.	"We Ride"	3:47
Total length:		43:44

== Charts ==
Chart performance for The Great Vacation
Chart (2024)	Peak position
Dutch Albums (Album Top 100)	5
