= Tim Knol =

Dutch singer-songwriter (born 1989)

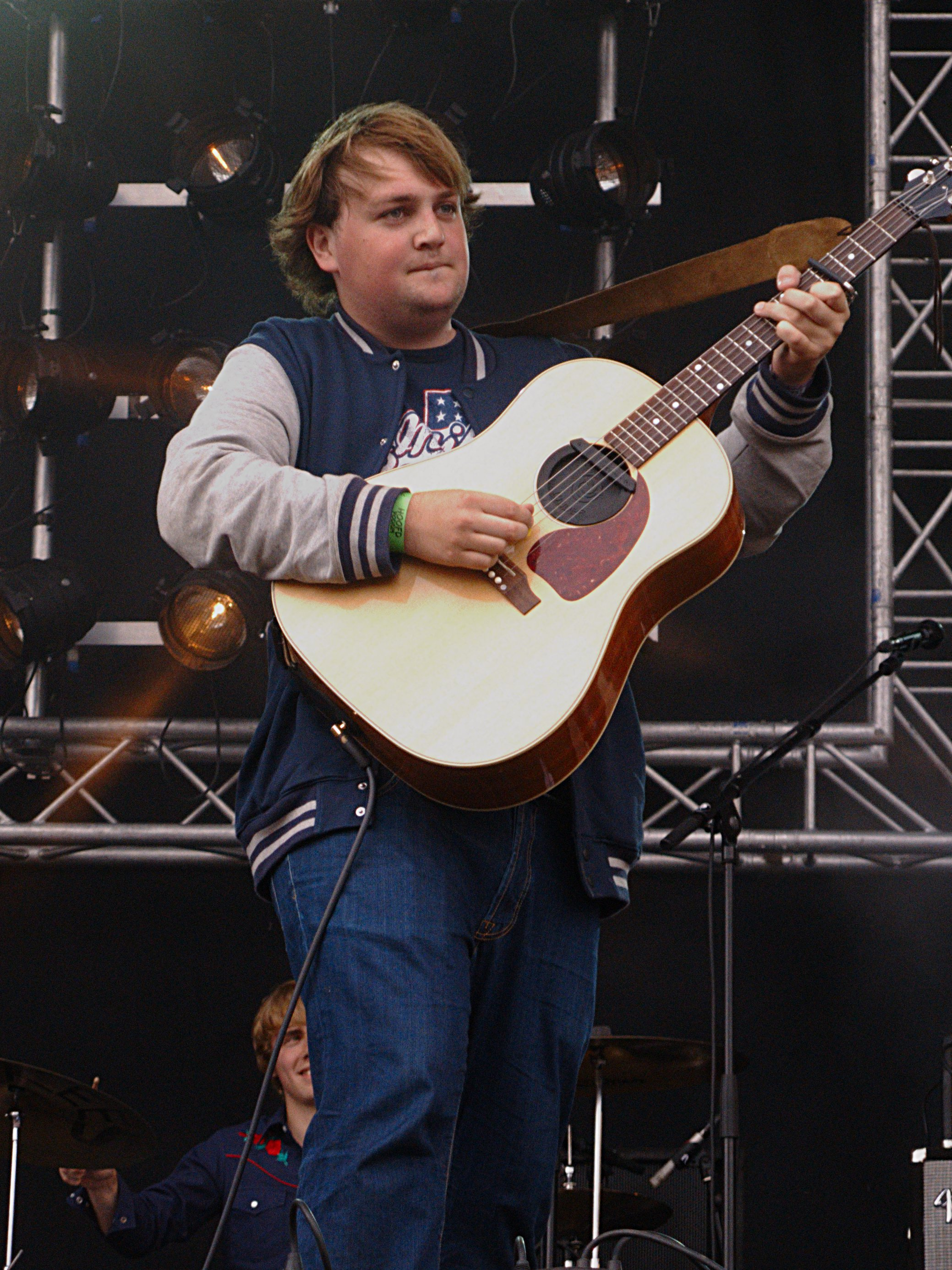
- Tim Knol in 2011.

Background information
- Born: Tim Knol; 12 September 1989 (age 36); Hoorn, Netherlands
- Origin: Hoorn, Netherlands
- Genres: Pop, roots rock
- Instrument(s): Vocals, guitar
- Labels: Excelsior Recordings
- Website: www.timknolofficial.com

Tim Knol (born 12 September 1989 in Hoorn) is a Dutch singer-songwriter.

== Biography ==
Knol was born and raised in Hoorn, where he started making music at the age of 10. Locally, he made an impression with the band Be Right Back in which he sang and played guitar. While playing in that band, he also worked on various side projects and recorded a couple of solo tracks. In May 2008 he played at De avond van het kippenvel in Utrecht, where he came in contact with Anne Soldaat, formerly of Daryll-Ann. Together they recorded some demos for Excelsior Recordings. In May 2009 he decided to quit his band, and start a solo career. In June 2009 the first result from his solo career, a cover version of Godley & Creme's Cry, appeared on the online compilation album Guilty Pleasures. Other artists that appeared on that album were Silence Is Sexy and Solo.

During the Lowlands Festival in August 2009, Knol signed a record deal with Excelsior Recordings. His debut record received positive reviews in the Dutch media. On the album Knol is accompanied by Jacob de Greeuw, Jeroen Kleijn and Matthijs van Duijvenbode from Johan and Anne Soldaat and Reyer Zwart from Do-The-Undo. Knol first presented his songs as a support act for Johan, during their farewell tour in the second half of 2009. After a few try-out concerts, the first big performance of Knol with his new band was at the Noorderslag Festival in Groningen January 2010.

His debut album was released in the UK on 24 May 2010 by Excelsior Recordings.

The music of Tim Knol is often compared to the roots rock of Gram Parsons, Wilco and Ryan Adams.

== Discography ==
- Tim Knol (2010)
- Days (2011)
- Soldier On (2013)
- Cut the Wire (2018)
- Happy Hour (2019)
- The Lost and Found Tapes Vol. 1 (2019)
- The Lost and Found Tapes Vol. 2 (2020)
- The Lost and Found Tapes Vol. 3 (2020)
- The Lost and Found Tapes Vol. 4 (2021)
- Live at Artone (2021)
