= Pull Up (album) =

2018 album by Johan

Studio album by Johan
- Released: 13 April 2018
- Genre: Indie rock
- Length: 43:38
- Label: Excelsior Recordings

Pull Up is the fifth studio album by Dutch band Johan. It was released on 13 April 2018. It was the first album released by the band in over eight years. In 2009, after the release of 4, Johan originally disbanded, but they reunited again in 2018. Pull Up was called a comeback album by many in the Dutch press, and the album was well reviewed by critics.

== Track listing ==
All tracks are written by Jacob de Greeuw

No.	Title	Length
1.	""About Time""	3:24
2.	""WF""	3:28
3.	""What a Scene""	3:44
4.	""Just Because""	4:06
5.	""Making Sense""	3:08
6.	""Anyone Got A Clue?""	4:54
7.	""Dream (On My Mind)""	3:23
8.	""Your Face""	4:09
9.	""Books and TV""	4:02
10.	""No Problem Next Week""	3:57
11.	""Quicksand""	4:58
Total length:		43:38
