= Black Cat John Brown =

Studio album by Alamo Race Track
- Released: October 23, 2006
- Recorded: Throughout 2006 at Studio Sound Enterprise, Weesp
- Genre: Alternative
- Label: Excelsior Recordings
- Producer: Frans Hagenaars

Professional ratings
Review scores
Source	Rating
De Volkskrant	link
Het Parool	link
Allmusic	link

Black Cat John Brown is the second album by the band Alamo Race Track, released October 23, 2006. The album's title track became a ‘hit’ on video site YouTube, where more than 541,000 people viewed the video within a two-week time span. This video was recorded by faceculture.nl during the 10th anniversary of the band's label Excelsior Recordings. It shows the band in a dressing room playing a stripped-down version of Black Cat John Brown.

The album garnered nothing but positive reviews in the Dutch press upon its release. The reviewers praised the songwriting of the band and the production by Frans Hagenaars. Several critics drew comparisons between the band and acts such as The Strokes, The Beatles and Interpol, among others. Nonetheless, the general consensus is that Alamo Race Track do have a sound of their own. This album is viewed as an improvement on their debut album "Birds At Home" especially in consistency.

== Track listing ==
All songs by Alamo Race Track.

1. "Black Cat John Brown"
2. "Don’t Beat This Dog"
3. "Stanley vs Hannah"
4. "Kiss Me Bar"
5. "The Northern Territory"
6. "My Heart"
7. "The Killing"
8. "On The Beach"
9. "Lee J. Cobb is Screaming a Lot"
10. "Breaker-Breaker 1-2"
11. "The Open Sea"
12. "The Chocolate Years"

== Trivia ==
- Singer Ralph Mulders wrote "Black Cat John Brown" inspired by a black cat that frequented his house.
- "The Killing" is based on the movie by the same name by director Stanley Kubrick.
