= Pergola (album) =

Studio album by Johan
- Released: 23 April 2001
- Recorded: 1999–2001
- Studios: Studio Sound Enterprise, Weesp
- Genre: Pop
- Label: Excelsior Recordings
- Producers: Johan & Frans Hagenaars

Johan chronology
Johan (1996)	Pergola (2001)	THX JHN (2006)

Professional ratings
Review scores
Source	Rating
Allmusic	link

Pergola is the second studio album by Johan, released in 2001, five years after their debut album Johan. Both albums were released on the record label Excelsior Recordings. The album was well received by the press. On 6 May 2002, the album was released with a different cover in Germany. The album was named after the street in the Dutch city of Hoorn where lead singer Jacco de Greeuw lived at the time. In 2009, the band received a gold record for Pergola. It had been sold over 30.000 times by that point, making it the band's best selling album. The album has been described as "being part of the canon of Dutch pop music".

De Greeuw wrote the album while battling depression and grief over the death of his father.

== Track listing ==
1. "Tumble and Fall"
2. "Pergola"
3. "I Mean I Guess"
4. "Tomorrow"
5. "Day is Done"
6. "I Feel Fine"
7. "Paper Planes"
8. "Save Game"
9. "How Does It Feel"
10. "Why_CP"
11. "Time and Time Again"
12. "Here"

== Personnel ==
- Jacco de Greeuw – lead singer, guitar, keyboard,
- Wim Kwakman – drums
- David Corel – bass, backing vocals
- Diederik Nomden – guitar, keyboard, backing vocals
- Diets Dijkstra – guitar
- Maarten Kooijman – guitar, backing vocals
