= El Pino & the Volunteers =

Dutch band

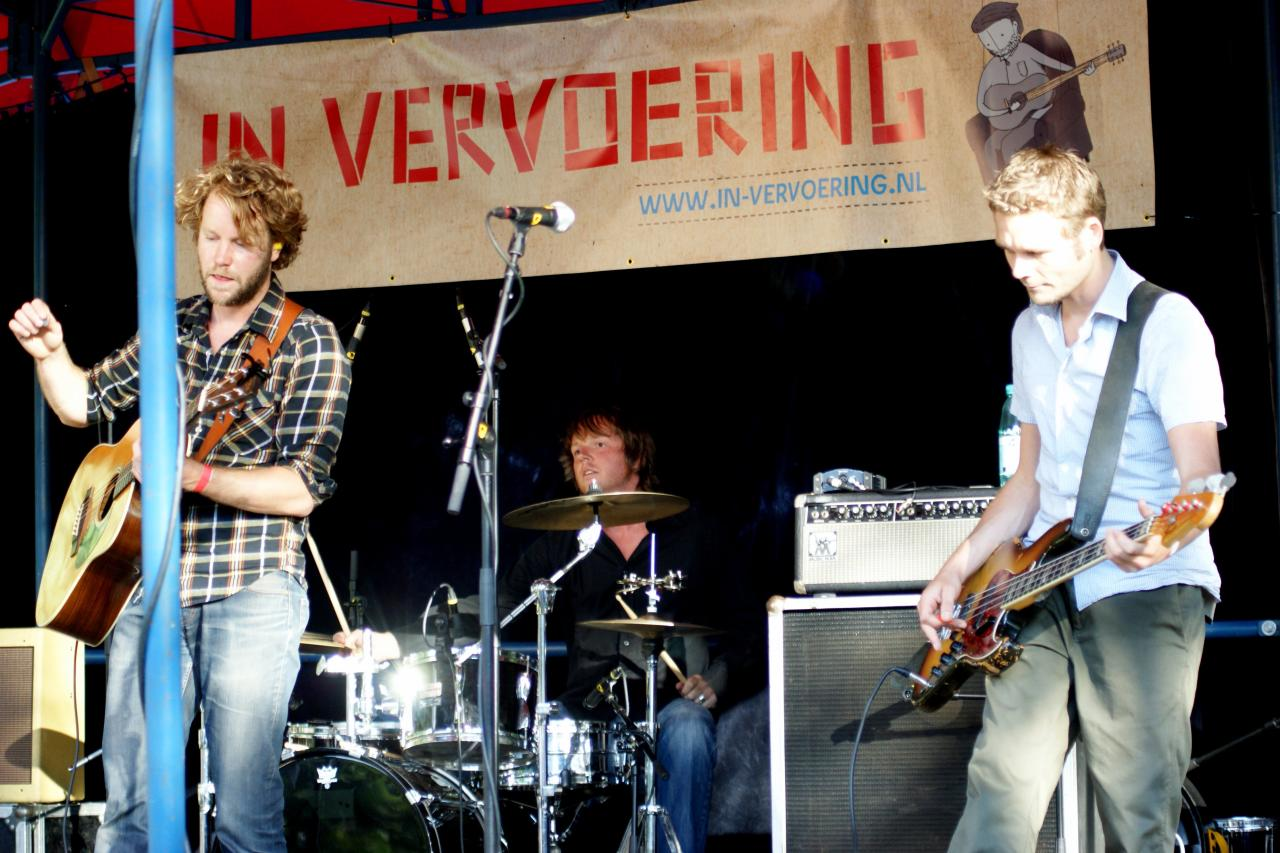

Background information
- Origin: Rotterdam, Netherlands
- Genres: Alt. country, Indie rock
- Years active: 2000- present
- Labels: Excelsior Recordings
- Members: David Pino; Mark van der Waarde; Job Roggeveen; Tjirk Deurloo; Jeroen Kleijn
- Past members: Skip Ross; Cary Da Costa; Harm Goslink Kuiper; Wouter de Waart
- Website: Official website

El Pino & the Volunteers is a band from Rotterdam, The Netherlands. The band's music mixes alt-rock with Americana. In 2006 the band's debut album Molten City was released on Excelsior Recordings.

== Biography ==
During an exchange project in Vancouver, David Pino, singer of Wiseguy, met two Canadians who introduced him to alternative country. In exchange for a six-pack of beer and a tank full of gasoline, Pino obtained an acoustic guitar. Together with his Canadian accomplices, he traveled across the country playing for cash or free beers. Back in the Netherlands, he brought together like-minded musicians, and El Pino & the Volunteers was born. The band got together only every once in a while, and concerts were held on an incidental basis.

After a couple of months of playing, the band started to become more serious. This newfound professionalism was solidified with the band's first EP Cougar. It was released in May 2005 by the small record label Stardumb. The EP sold out in no-time and received much praise in the Dutch music press.

In December 2005, MTV aired a special on the band in its Brand New show. Pino decided to leave his main band Wiseguy to focus completely on El Pino & the Volunteers.

In early 2006, the band was invited to the prestigious Noorderslag festival in Groningen. The press was enthusiastic, and praised the band for its musicianship (de Volkskrant). Dutch Excelsior Recordings, home of Johan, Daryll-Ann and GEM, signed the band immediately. El Pino & the Volunteers played at Club 3voor12 that February, recorded an Apers song for a tribute album in March, and performed at Motel Mozaique in April. And, in May, the band performed at the 10th anniversary party of Excelsior Recordings, together with several of their labelmates.

In May and June the band recorded 16 tracks for its debut album, which Reyn Ouwehand produced. On August 31, the album, named Molten City, was presented in Rotown in Rotterdam. The album was received well by the music press, becoming album of the week at 3voor12 (link). In September and October the band supported Johan during their Dutch club tour.

The band rounded out the year by performing at the Fine Fine Music tour in December 2006.

The next record, also produced by Reyn Ouwehand, was released November 16, 2009.

== Discography ==
Title	Release	Label	Remarks
The Long-lost Art of Becoming Invisible	2009	Excelsior Recordings	On vinyl and CD
No One Knows A Thing These Days (split single with Mono)	2007	Excelsior Recordings, Zabel, LVR en Rara Records	Exclusively on vinyl
Molten City (album)	2006	Excelsior Recordings	On vinyl and CD
Cougar (EP)	2005	Stardumb Records	
These Are Not The Days (EP)	2001	Eigen beheer	Exclusively on vinyl

== Band members ==
- David Pino – vocals, lead guitar, acoustics guitar & harmonica
- Mark van der Waarde – bass, backing vocals
- Job Roggeveen – keys
- Tjirk Deurloo – acoustic & electric guitar, backing vocals
- Jeroen Kleijn - drums, percussion

=== Former band members ===
- Skip Ross - drums
- Cary Da Costa - lap steel, mandoline, melodica
- Harm Goslink Kuiper – 5-string banjo, dobro / lap steel, mandolin, accordion
- Wouter de Waart – drums, percussion
