= Spinvis (album) =

Studio album by Spinvis
- Released: 1 May 2002
- Recorded: 1999–2002
- Studio: De Ruimte (Nieuwegein)
- Genre: Indietronica; lo-fi; Nederpop
- Length: 46:23
- Language: Dutch
- Label: Excelsior Recordings
- Producer: Erik de Jong

Spinvis chronology
| Spinvis (2002) | Nieuwegein aan zee (2004) |

Singles from Spinvis
- 1. "Smalfilm" Released: 5 April 2002; 2. "Voor ik vergeet" Released: 1 July 2002; 3. "Bagagedrager" Released: 3 July 2003

Spinvis is the debut album by Dutch music project Spinvis, the one-man band of singer-songwriter Erik de Jong. Released on 1 May 2002 when De Jong was 41 years old, the album received strong reviews from the Dutch music press and was seen as one of the best albums of the year. It was supported by three singles.

It was certified Gold in the Netherlands in 2006. Oor named it the best album from the Netherlands of the 21st century.

== Background ==
Erik de Jong worked at night as a mail sorter. While he played in bands throughout his life, the birth of his first child inspired him to further his ambitions as a musician, including singing for the first time as he did not like the sound of his voice. He sent a demo to Excelsior Recordings, a Dutch independent record label, who agreed to release his debut album. De Jong wrote the album's songs in his Nieuwegein attic over an extended period of time. "I worked on that first record for a long time, far too long. Of course there was no deadline, no audience, no record company. I sat wonderfully in my own paradise."

He was skeptical about finding success as a musician. "A 40-year-old man from Nieuwegein who works at the post office, who can't sing, who writes improbable lyrics — nothing indicated that it would work out. I suddenly thought, 'Is it going to work out, Erik?'."

Once the album came out, De Jong had to take an unpaid leave of absence from his job in order to tour. "One night I was standing in a packed Paradiso and the next I was just sorting again. No one knew what I had done before that either. That was good, because it is also a lesson in humility," he recalled.

=== Album artwork ===
The album cover of Spinvis features the three-song cassette demo tape that Erik de Jong mailed to Excelsior Recordings. It was also a symbol that he deliberately chose to represent the analogue technology of the 1980s and its associated home computer era.

== Recording and lyrics ==
De Jong's attic consisted of a computer, a synthesizer, a mixing console, some peripherals, several musical instruments and a few of his children's toys. The first song he wrote was "Bagagedrager" in 1999. Excelsior Recordings decided not to re-record any of De Jong's original attic takes. De Jong himself embraced the nature of imperfection in his music because it reflected the imperfection of people's existences. This included his singing voice, which De Jong said was not a great talent. The music of Spinvis has been described as indietronica, lo-fi and Nederpop.

The decision to sing in his native Dutch instead of English was easy for him to make, because "when you sing in English, you use a accent that you only know from television. It's always fake. You're going to be imitating something."

De Jong carried a notebook with him which he would write down future song lyrics in, wanting to "capture the Netherlands of today" while writing about "the everyday, recurring things" in his music. His location influenced him as well, and he said: "I see a beauty in the people who ended up here in Nieuwegein. Of course, everyone had visions in their youth about what their lives would look like. And then: streets full of disappointments, streets full of regrets. You see people just deal with it day in, day out. I think that's beautiful."

"Voor ik vergeet" is often believed to be about Alzheimer's disease, but that was not the intended meaning of the song. "The crazy thing about your memory is that things you remember about your life, those aren't necessarily the big important things. I just wanted to write those things down," De Jong said.

"Bagagedrager" was written about De Jong's youth and his childhood memories. One which stood out to him was when he was cycling by himself on the Afsluitdijk and felt truly alone for the first time.

== Commercial performance ==
By November, Spinvis became the best-selling album in Excelsior Recordings history. Label founder Ferry Roseboom recalled saying that after receiving the demos, he loved it but could not do anything with it.

In 2006, Spinvis was certified Gold by the NVPI, indicating sales of at least 35,000 copies in the Netherlands.

"Bagagedrager" was the most successful single on the charts, reaching No. 20 on the Tipparade ("bubbling under") of the Dutch Top 40 and No. 75 on the Single Top 100.

== Critical reception ==
Professional ratings
Review scores
| Source | Rating |
|---|---|
| AllMusic | 4.5/5 stars |

In a glowing review, AllMusic's Philip D. Huff said that "The songs on Spinvis appear to be simple and messy, but in fact they are elaborately and inventively orchestrated. Only on a second or a third listen does one hear that almost every second line rhymes, and that there are quirky sound effects beneath all the great rhythm tracks."

Spinvis was praised for his lyricism. "You could hear how he had been endlessly puzzling and polishing on his own with samplers, drum computers and guitars. His productions sounded ragged and rough, and at the same time very well thought out. Within no time, others were running off with his work," 3voor12 wrote.

The album finished second in Oor's year-end critics' list for 2002, behind Queens of the Stone Age's Songs for the Deaf.

"Smalfilm" finished in second place for the 2002 VPRO Song of the Year voting, behind "No One Knows" by Queens of the Stone Age.

"Voor ik vergeet" was sung by Lenette van Dongen in her theatre program Vedette. It won the Annie M.G. Schmidt Prize for best theatre song of the year in 2003.

=== Legacy ===
In 2025, Oor crowned it as the best album from the Netherlands of the 21st century, comparing its impact to The Velvet Underground & Nico of Nederpop.

== Track listing ==
| No. | Title | Length |
|---|---|---|
| 1. | "Bagagedrager" ("Luggage Rack") | 6:14 |
| 2. | "Smalfilm" ("Narrow Film") | 4:02 |
| 3. | "Voor ik vergeet" ("Before I Forget") | 4:25 |
| 4. | "Astronaut" | 4:15 |
| 5. | "Ronnie gaat naar huis" ("Ronnie Goes Home") | 4:41 |
| 6. | "In de staat van narcose" ("In an Anesthetic State") | 3:35 |
| 7. | "Mike Clark" | 0:34 |
| 8. | "Herfst en Nieuwegein" ("Autumn and Nieuwegein") | 3:51 |
| 9. | "Handige tante – jongen met geld" ("Helpful Aunt – Boy With Money") | 2:27 |
| 10. | "De talen van mijn tong" ("The Languages of My Tongue") | 2:25 |
| 11. | "Leo's definitieve aquarium" ("Leo's Final Aquarium") | 1:01 |
| 12. | "Limonadeglazen wodka" ("Lemonade Glass Vodka") | 5:00 |
| 13. | "Regen en patchoulli" ("Rain and Patchouli") | 4:03 |
| Total length: | | 46:23 |

== Charts ==
| Chart (2002) | Peak position |
|---|---|
| Dutch Albums (Album Top 100) | 27 |

| Chart (2021) | Peak position |
|---|---|
| Belgian Albums (Ultratop Flanders) | 159 |
