= Do-The-Undo =

- Origin: Netherlands
- Genres: Rock
- Years active: 2005- present
- Labels: Excelsior Recordings
- Website: MySpace

Do-The-Undo is the solo outfit of Anne Soldaat, former main singer of Daryll-Ann. The band released its self-titled debut record in January 2007 on Excelsior Recordings.

== Biography ==
When Daryll-Ann dissolved in 2004 its members all went their separate ways. Anne Soldaat, the band’s guitar player, does not waste any time and immediately starts making new music. His first project is for Cat-A-Day Tales, a book on cats that is accompanied by an album. Soldaat writes and sings several songs for the album. The package is released 2004.

Throughout 2005 Soldaat coaches the band GEM during the recording sessions of their second album ‘Escapades’, assisting in songwriting.

In the meantime he composes new songs for his new solo project, Do-The-Undo. Throughout 2006 Soldaat records with producer Frans Hagenaars. He asks former Daryll-Ann bandmate Dick Brouwers to help out on bass guitar. Also Henk Jonkers (Hallo Venray) and Matthijs van Duijvenbode lend a hand on organ. Soldaat sings and plays guitar.

Soldaat and crew finish their recordings in September 2006. Following this Do-The-Undo gears up for some touring. The band plays as support act for Solo and is one of the main bands of the Fine Fine Music tour in December. The band’s self-titled debut album is released in January 2007.

In 2009 Soldaat releases his second solo album 'In Another Life', but now the Do-the-Undo moniker is replaced for 'Anne Soldaat'.

== Current members ==
- Anne Soldaat – vocals and guitars
- Mourits Westerik - vocals and guitars
- Reyer Zwart – bass guitar
- Thijs van Duijvenbode – organ, piano and vocals
- Marcel van As - drums

== Discography ==
- Do-The-Undo (2007)
- In Another Life (2009)
