= The Herb Spectacles =

Dutch mariachi band

- Origin: The Netherlands
- Genres: Tijuana, Mariachi
- Years active: 1999–2006 (active)
- Label: Excelsior Recordings
- Members: Marcel Kruup; Maarten Heijblok; Philip ten Bosch; Vincent van Els; Ron van der Flier; Markward J. Smit; Gijs Levelt; Theo van Kampen
- Website: www.herbspectacles.nl

The Herb Spectacles were a Dutch mariachi band formed in the Netherlands in 1999. The group was inspired by the likes of Chet Baker’s mariachi recordings and Herb Alpert’s Tijuana Brass.

== Biography ==
The Herb Spectacles formed in late 1999, when Marcel Kruup and Maarten Heijblok (both ex-Treble Spankers) teamed up with members from Amsterdam's Klezmerband and added a marimba player and percussionist.

The group released its debut album, The Incredible World of... in June 2003 through Excelsior Recordings, after which the group made appearances at North Sea Jazz and Lowlands, two Dutch music festivals.

In 2006, the Herb Spectacles released their second album called Bongolito’s Hideaway.
