= Cloud Cafe =

Dutch rock band (formed 2020)

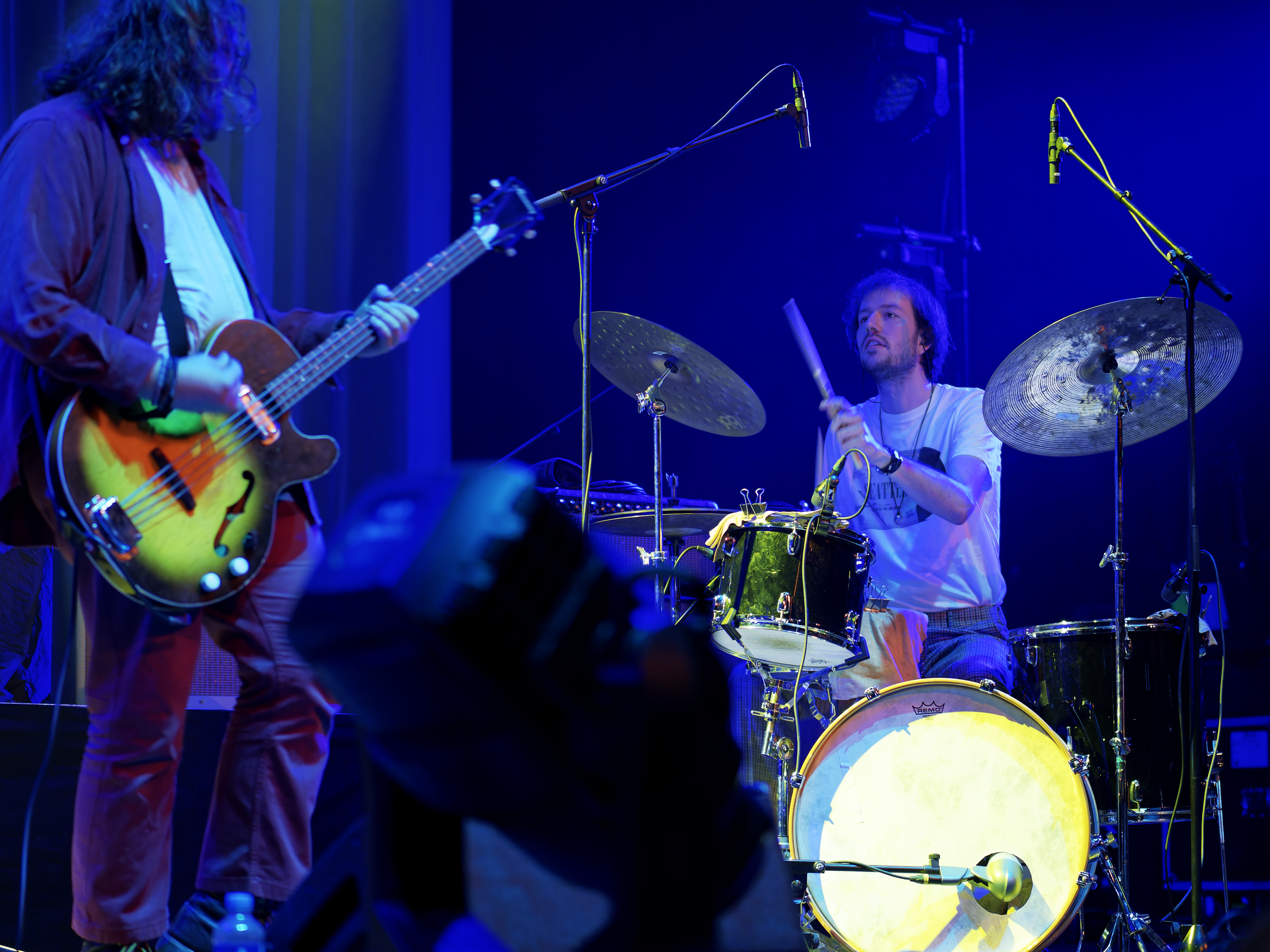

Background information
- Origin: Amsterdam
- Genres: Indie rock, grunge, folk rock
- Years active: 2020–present
- Label: Excelsior Recordings
- Members: Tara Wilts; David Coehoorn; Dirck Kroes; Tom Radsma

Cloud Cafe is an indie rock band from Amsterdam, The Netherlands. The band's debut EP was released in March 2023, and on 6 September 2024 the band released their first studio album Gift Horse.

== History ==
Founded in the summer of 2020, the band performed various times before taking part in the 'Amsterdamse Popprijs' (Amsterdam pop-prize) band competition, which they won on 19 November 2022.

Cloud Cafe released their first single In Over Your Head on 25 November 2022. On 31 March 2023 their self-titled EP was released on the independent Dutch record label Excelsior Recordings, it was recorded by the band themselves in Haarlem.

The band performed at the festival Into The Great Wide Open in September of that year. To celebrate that, the band also released a single called "Honey".

On 6 September 2024, Cloud Cafe released their debut album Gift Horse. The album received positive reviews. Menno Pot of de Volkskrant described it as one of the best Dutch debuts of 2024 and praised the strong melodies on the album.

== Musical style ==
The band's style has been described as folk rock, indie rock, folk noire with a grunge edge and grunge-folk. Their music been compared to Big Thief.

== Discography ==
=== Studio albums ===
Title	Details
Gift Horse	Released 6 September 2024; Label: Excelsior Recordings; Format: streaming, digital download, vinyl, CD
