= Lefties Soul Connection =

Dutch funk band

- Origin: Amsterdam, Netherlands
- Genres: Funk
- Years active: 2001–present
- Labels: Excelsior Recordings; TopNotch
- Website: leftiessoulconnection.com

Lefties Soul Connection are a Dutch funk band from Amsterdam.

The band was formed by guitarist Onno Smit and organist Alviz in August 2001, with Cody Vogel joining on drums by the end of the year. Bram Bosman joined as full-time bassist early in 2002, as the group solidified a mostly instrumental sound influenced by The Meters and Booker T & the MGs. They began releasing 45rpm singles on Melting Pot Music, including a cover version of DJ Shadow's "Organ Donor". Their debut full-length, Hutspot, arrived in 2006, with a follow-up, Skimming the Skum, released in 2007. The group toured with Hind Laroussi in 2009.

== Members ==
Current

- Onno Smit – guitar
- Alviz – Hammond organ
- Pieter Bakker – bass
- Cody Vogel – drums

Former

- Bram Bosman – bass (2002–2008)

== Discography ==
LP:

- Dutch Soul Food, (2004)
- Hutspot (Excelsior Recordings, 2006)
- Skimming the Skum (Excelsior Recordings, 2007)
- One Punch Pete (TopNotch, 2011)
