= New Adventures (Dutch band) =

Dutch blues rock band

The New Adventures were a Dutch blues rock band successful during the 1980s. Their most successful songs were Come On (a cover of the song of the same name by Chuck Berry) and Midnight Magic Maniac, both of which charted on the Dutch Top 40. The basic line up consisted of Peter Bootsman lead guitar and vocals, Harry de Winter on bass and Bennie Top on drums. In 1980, they won a Silver Harp.

== Discography ==
Albums:

- New Adventures 1980 14 on Dutch chart
- Wild Cats Moanin' 1981 17 on Dutch chart
- Point Blank 1982 20 on Dutch chart
- Radiator 1983
- The Best Adventures 1983 compilation
- Live's A Mess 1986 Live album
- Babyshake 1998
- Station Zero 2014
