= Benjamin B =

Dutch rock band

- Origin: Winschoten, Netherlands
- Genres: Alternative rock
- Years active: 1994–2005 (active)
- Labels: Living Room Records, Excelsior Recordings
- Members: Eddy Scholtens; Fiebo Scholtens; Michel Weber; Nico Langeland; Rene Asschert; Vincent Van Vondel
- Past members: Barbara Lampe
- Website: Official website

Benjamin B was a guitar rock band in Groningen, Netherlands. In 1995, it released its self-titled debut album independently as a cassette tape. In 2020, the debut album was rereleased on vinyl and CD via Excelsior Records. The band released its last record Tired of the Moon on Living Room Records. Benjamin B disbanded in 2005.

== History ==
=== Early days ===
In 1994 singer/guitar player Fiebo Scholtens dropped out of law school. He decided to start a band together with Barbara Lampe and Michel Weber. Thus Benjamin B. was founded.

In the following year the band took part in several band competitions. The group won the Pop=Prima award and also managed to reach the final round of De Grote Prijs, an important Dutch competition for new musical talent. In addition to that, the band’s first demo became ‘demo of the year’ in Music Maker and received a very positive review in FRET magazine.

=== Excelsior Recordings ===
In 1996 these successes translated into a record deal with Excelsior Recordings. The much praised mini-cd Benjamin B. CD, with four original compositions and one Gershwin cover, was released in the fall of ’96.

The band released their first full-length CD The Comfort of Replay the next year.

1998 saw the band playing at Noorderslag festival alongside the rest of the Netherlands' finest bands. In May Barbara B. left the band, and Vincent van Vondel (or Vincent B.) took her place. Also Nico B. joined the band on keys/guitar, turning Benjamin B. into a quartet.

The band’s second full-length album Instant Art was released in 1999. The record was a true studio album, as the band pieced the songs together during the recording sessions. Instant Art failed to be a commercial breakthrough though.

In 2000 Scholtens worked on a project away from Benjamin B: together with Robert de Keijser he released an album under the name Stad. The songs on the record were all sung in a Northern Dutch dialect (Gronings).

After a recess of nearly a year the band returned to the stage, playing the Eurosonic festival in January 2001. The band started work on a new album. At the same time the band released a cover song on their website each month. Their first cover song was "Boys Don’t Cry" from The Cure. In September Scholten’s Stad project reached the semi-finals of De Grote Prijs van Nederland.

In 2003 the band finally recorded their third album, but it took another year for the album to be released. Excelsior Recordings were not willing to release the version that the band recorded on its own account. The label offered the band the opportunity to re-record the album to improve its sound quality. After a lengthy period of deliberation the band opted to stick to the album in its initial form.

=== Living Room Records ===
In the meantime Benjamin B. had transformed into a six-piece band: Eddy Scholtens played guitar and keys, Rene Asschert handled the drums. In March this new line-up played shows in several Dutch venues.

With Living Room Records Benjamin B. found a new home for their album Tired of the Moon, which was released in the fall of 2004. Former member Barbara B. also made a return as she joined in on the track Drive.

In 2005 the band submitted the song Yolk to compilation record Schaamte En Woede. The profits of this charity album were for the benefit of a refugee support organisation.

== Discography ==
- Benjamin B (1995)
- The Comfort of Replay (1997)
- Instant Art (1999)
- Tired of the Moon (2003)
