= Bertolf Lentink =

Dutch singer/songwriter

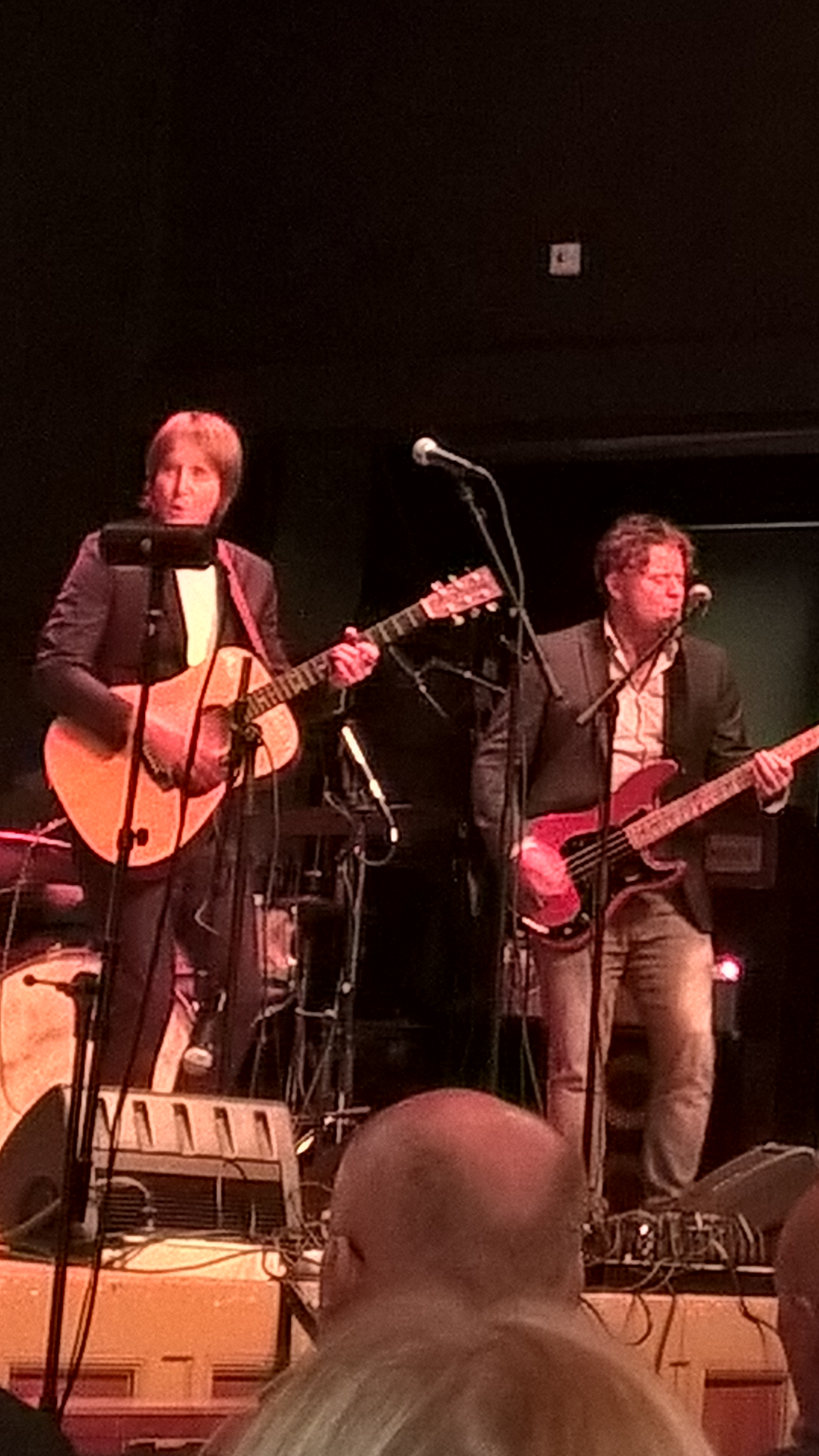
Bertolf

Bertolf Lentink (Dronten, July 2, 1980) is a Dutch singer/songwriter. In 2010, he was awarded the Zilveren Harp.

== Biography ==
Lentink plays guitar and piano. After playing in a band called The Junes, he landed a job playing with the popular Dutch singer Ilse De Lange. In 2009 he released his debut solo album, For Life, which reached #39 on the Dutch music charts; the single "Another day" reached #10. His second album, Snakes & Ladders, reached #11, with the singles "Two in a Million" and "Cut me loose" reaching #2 and #3, respectively.

On March 3, 2010, Lentink was awarded the "Zilveren Harp", an award given to promising young artists by BUMA/STEMRA. The judges said that Bertolf was given the Silver Harp "mainly because of the quality of his songs," and that they see Bertolf as "a composer and lyricist with a great future.".

== Discography ==
- For Life (2009)
- Snakes & Ladders (2010)
- Bertolf (2012)
- First & Then (2015)
- Big Shadows of Small Things (2019)
- Happy in Hindsight (2021)
- Bluefinger (2023)
