= Bauer (band) =

Dutch band

- Origin: Amsterdam, Netherlands
- Genres: Indie rock, orchestral pop
- Years active: 1999–present
- Label: Basta Music
- Members: Berend Dubbe
- Past members: Sonja van Hamel (2000 - 2006)

Bauer is a band founded in 1999 by former Bettie Serveert drummer Berend Dubbe and based in Amsterdam, Netherlands. To support the debut Bauer album with live shows, Dubbe formed a live band and with member Sonja van Hamel, Bauer was presented as a pop-duo from 2000-2006. Together, they released three records. In 2000, Bauer won a Zilveren Harp (Silver Harp) awarded by Dutch organization BUMA/STEMRA. What began as electropop on earlier albums developed over time into orchestral pop.

In 2016, a new Bauer album was released, Eyes Fully Open. Like 1999's On the Move, it is a solo album (Dubbe). It is the first Bauer album released on Basta Music (previously the band was signed to Excelsior Recordings Partners in Crime, and Wabana).

== Discography ==
Year	Title	Label	Other information
1999	On the Move	Excelsior Recordings	Solo album (Berend Dubbe)
2000	Can't Stop Singing	Partners in Crime Records	
2001	Can't Stop Singing	Wabana Records	USA release
2004	Baueresque	Excelsior Recordings	
2006	The Bauer Melody of 2006	Excelsior Recordings	featuring Metropole Orkest
2016	Eyes Fully Open	Basta Music	Solo album (Berend Dubbe)
