= Johan (album) =

Studio album by Johan
- Released: November 4, 1996
- Recorded: Spring 1996
- Studio: S.S.E. Studio, Amsterdam
- Genre: Alternative rock; pop rock
- Label: Excelsior Recordings

Johan chronology
Johan (1996)	Pergola (2001)

Professional ratings
Review scores
Source	Rating
AllMusic	4.5/5 stars

Johan is the debut album by Dutch Rock band Johan. It was released on November 4, 1996, by the record label Excelsior Recordings. The album was produced by Frans Hagenaars and recorded in Studio Sound Enterprise, Amsterdam.

The album was released in the United States in June 1997 by the record label SpinArt.

== Track listing ==
1. "Everybody Knows"
2. "Not Funny Anymore (It's)"
3. "Back In School"
4. "Payment"
5. "5 O' Clock (It's)"
6. "Easy (It's)"
7. "Suffer Baby"
8. "Life On Mars"
9. "December"
10. "Porneaux"
11. "Swing"
12. "He's Not There"
13. "Brown Mice"
