= Zilveren Harp =

Dutch award for a promising music talent

The Zilveren Harp (Silver Harp) was a Dutch award given annually to promising musical talent. The award is very prestigious and winners were chosen by a different jury each year. The Zilveren Harp was given by the foundation "Buma Cultuur", which aims to promote Dutch music.

The award was given in 1969-2011; except for the year 1972.

Buma Cultuur also presents the Gouden Harp award, which is given to an artist for his entire oeuvre and Buma Export Award for acts which are successful abroad.

== Winners ==
The winners were announced at the end of the year, but the presentation was usually in February of the next year.

Year	Winner(s)
1969	Lenny Kuhr, Marinus Gerritsen, George Kooymans and Herman van Veen
1970	Saskia & Serge and Hans Bouwens & Jan Visser (both George Baker Selection)
1971	Loeki Knol, Frits Lambrechts and Thijs van Leer
1972	No award(s) presented.
1973	Earth & Fire, Greenfield & Cook and Euson
1974	Don Quishocking, Fon Klement and Wally Tax
1975	Marjol Flore and Robert Long
1976	Alexander Curly, Peter Schaap and Tekstpierement
1977	Nelleke Burg, Wieteke van Dort, Ad Kraamer and Anita Meyer
1978	Tol Hansse and Clous van Mechelen
1979	Herman Brood & His Wild Romance, Flairck and Massada
1980	Sietse Dolstra, Margriet Markerink, New Adventures and Ad Visser
1981	André Hazes, Maywood, NAR and Spargo
1982	Doe Maar, Fay Lovsky and Daniël Sahuleka
1983	Het Goede Doel, Cherry and Toontje Lager
1984	Frank Boeijen Groep, Noodweer, Roberto Jacketti & The Scooters and Pluche & Plastic
1985	Gerard Joling, Julya Lo'ko, Mai Tai and Frisse Jongens
1986	Nadieh
1987	De Dijk, Frizzle Sizzle and Richenel
1988	De Meisjes, The Fatal Flowers and René Froger
1989	Loïs Lane, Ruth Jacott and Tambourine
1990	Stef Bos, Tröckener Kecks and Carmen Sars
1991	Gordon, Esther Tuely and Robby Valentine
1992	Ryan van den Akker, Ernst-Daniël Smid and Rowwen Hèze
1993	De Jazzpolitie and Valensia
1994	Doop, Intermezzo and Van Dik Hout
1995	Frans Bauer, DJ Paul Elstak and Vitalis
1996	Eboman, Skik and Total Touch
1997	Acda en de Munnik, Caesar, Trijntje Oosterhuis and Junkie XL
1998	Bløf, Postmen and Maarten van Roozendaal
1999	Ferry Corsten, André Manuel and Krang and Dyzack
2000	Krezip and Niet Uit Het Raam (NUHR)
2001	Brainpower, DJ Tiësto, De Kift and Green Lizard
2002	Within Temptation, Beef and Relax
2003	Spinvis, Peter Pan Speedrock and Tasha's World
2004	Ali B, Kasper van Kooten, Alain Clark and The Sheer
2005	Stevie Ann, Thomas Berge and Pete Philly & Perquisite
2006	a balladeer, Nick & Simon and Opgezwolle
2007	3js, The Opposites, Wouter Hamel
2008	Ziggi, Typhoon, Room Eleven
2009	Bertolf Lentink, Giovanca, Colin Benders (Kyteman)
2010	Caro Emerald, Frans Duijts, Sander van Doorn
2011	Laura Jansen, Django Wagner, Afrojack

== See also ==
- Gouden Harp
- List of music awards
