= THX JHN =

Studio album by Johan
- Released: May 22, 2006
- Genre: Pop
- Length: 42:42
- Label: Excelsior Recordings

Johan chronology
Pergola (2001)	THX JHN (2006)	4 (2009)

Professional ratings
Review scores
Source	Rating
PopMatters	8/10 stars

THX JHN is the third studio album by Johan released on May 22, 2006. The previous album, Pergola, was released five years earlier. Like all Johan albums, it was released on the Excelsior Recordings label.

== Track listing ==
1. "Coming In from the Cold"
2. "Oceans"
3. "Walking Away"
4. "She's Got a Way with Men"
5. "Reader Takes a Stand"
6. "Tonight"
7. "When I'm on My Own"
8. "Any Other Guy"
9. "Out of Reach"
10. "Staring at the Sun"
11. "You Know"
