= Spinvis =

Dutch music project

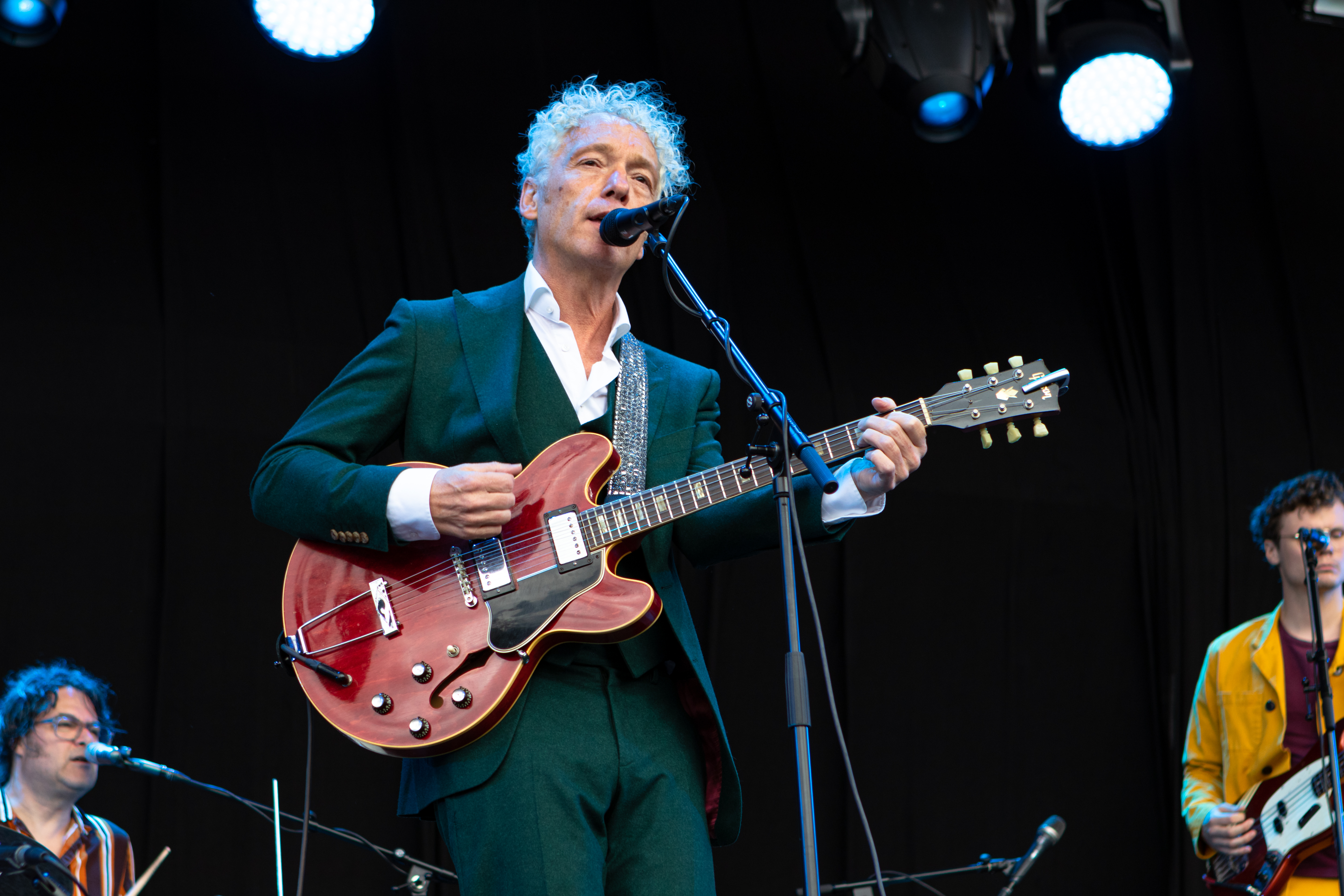
- Spinvis at Haldern Pop Festival 2019

Background information
- Born: Erik de Jong; February 2, 1961 (age 65); Spijkenisse, Netherlands
- Origin: Nieuwegein, Netherlands
- Genres: Indietronica; lo-fi
- Years active: 2001–present
- Label: Excelsior Recordings
- Website: Official website

Spinvis is a Dutch one-man music project centred on Erik de Jong (born 2 February 1961).

Using experimental lo-fi music, de Jong released his debut album as Spinvis in 2002 at the age of 41. He has recorded five top-ten albums in the Netherlands, and his sixth studio album 7.6.9.6. reached number one on the Dutch Albums Chart. Additionally, his self-titled debut album and live album Nieuwegein aan Zee were certified Gold in the Netherlands.

In 2007, Spinvis was awarded the Popprijs, given annually to the artist who made the most important contribution to Dutch pop music last year.

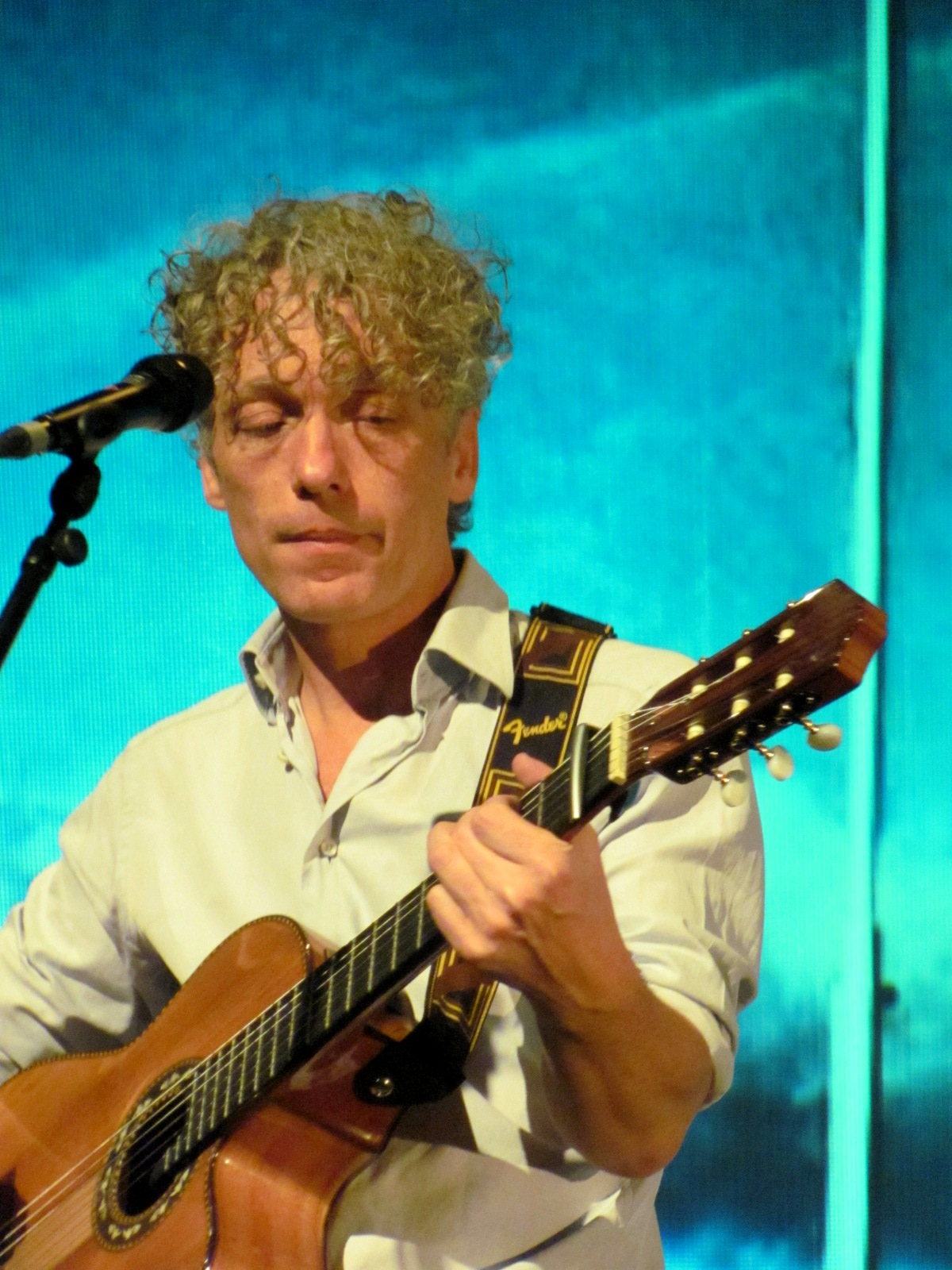
Erik de Jong performing in Wageningen, April 2011

== Early life ==
Erik de Jong was born in 1961 as the second of four children in Spijkenisse, South Holland. His father Walter played the guitar and his mother Sjaan played the ukulele and Hawaiian guitar. When he was one year old, his family moved to Rotterdam.

His parents were both active in the Pacifist Socialist Party (PSP) and De Jong lived in "almost a cliché hippie family." His house was a shelter for the Youth Advisory Center and was "commune-like", often with over 15 people sitting at their table and unfamiliar children living inside, whom his mother invited in. There were all kinds of musical instruments available for him to play, beginning at a young age.

In 1976, he joined his brother's punk rock band named Blitzkrieg, later named The Duds. The Duds broke up in 1979, and he formed a new wave band Hi-Jinx, whose guitarist René van Barneveld would later go on to be a member of Urban Dance Squad.

Following the end of Hi-Jinx, he worked as a mail sorter. For a year and a half, he worked as a conductor on the post train route between Amsterdam and Utrecht, and during this period he began to write many lyrics while working.

== Career ==
=== Spinvis ===
In 2001, at the age of 40, Erik de Jong, or Spinvis sent a three-song demo to the Dutch indie label, Excelsior Recordings. Within two weeks, a record deal was signed. The label decided to keep the songs that had been recorded by Spinvis on his home computer in the attic of his family house. With some minor mixing touch-ups, these songs comprised Spinvis' first album, released in the Netherlands on 1 April 2002 when he was 41. The album was received positively by critics and the album reached number one in Oor magazine's De Moordlijst, an alternative chart in the Netherlands.

De Jong began touring, and played at the Crossing Border Festival in Amsterdam with jazz harmonica player Toots Thielemans. At the end of 2002, Spinvis' song "Smalfilm" was second in the VPRO's Song of the Year 2002 contest. In addition to this, De Jong received an Essent Award, a prize for breakthrough artists.

Spinvis and his ensemble completed a brief tour in early 2003. With labelmates Bauer, De Jong created a track for a Dutch music webzine compilation. In August, Spinvis performed at the Haldern Open Air in Germany, and at Pukkelpop in Belgium. On 1 December, "Nieuwegein aan Zee" was released, containing a live registration and a number of unreleased tracks. On 17 December, Spinvis performed with an orchestra in Vredenburg, Utrecht.

In early 2004, Spinvis won two Dutch awards, the Silver Harp and the Annie M.G. Schmidt prize. In honour of the fourth edition of the Cross-Linx festival De Jong composed a musical piece that consists of three rhythmical monologues. Actress Roos Ouwehand, opera singer Lucia Meeuwsen and actor Hans Dagelet performed the pieces together with Spinvis. For filmmaker Theo van Gogh, Spinvis wrote the title song for the television series Medea. This six-part series on Dutch politics was shown in the winter of 2004. In this busy year Spinvis also contributed to Claudia de Breij's song "Nieuwbouwwijk".

=== Dagen van gras, dagen van stro ===
During the Noorderslag music festival, the Ringtone Society presented a website that promoted the artistic development of ringtones. Spinvis participated in this project. The song "Idee Zeventien" ('Idea Seventeen') appeared on the compilation The Pet Series: Volume 4. During spring 2005, Spinvis Performed in Dutch theaters with his Lotus Europa tour. The band Solo played as support act. In April, Spinvis created a theatrical show in which he mixed stock footage with music and dialogue. Together with Hans Dagelet, Spinvis performed the piece. On 11 September, Spinvis' performance at the Dutch Moroccan Music Experience was cancelled because the organisers objected to the lyrics of the song "Het Mes van God" ('The Dagger of God'). The song's lyrics were considered too sensitive as Spinvis refers to Theo van Gogh's assassination in November 2004. Spinvis made a guest appearance on the album Geluiden van Weleer of the band, at the close of every day. In November, his own album Dagen van gras, dagen van stro was released. The album's title is a translation of Days of Grass, Days of Straw, a book by R.A. Lafferty from 1973. The first single from the album was "Het Voordeel van Video" (The Advantage of Video). In December, Spinvis began a tour in support of the album.

The second single was "Ik Wil Alleen Maar Zwemmen" (I Just Want To Swim). De Jong created a new mix for the song and also added a dub version to the release. The song "Voor Ik Vergeet" (Before I Forget) became part of Strips in Stereo. For this project, visual artists drew comics based on 14 Dutch songs. Hanco Kolk drew the graphics for Spinvis' song. Strips in Stereo was presented in Paradiso, Amsterdam, in March, in conjunction with Boekenweek 2006 (the annual 'book week' where awards are awarded and writers meet during the 'book ball').

=== JA! ===
Together with Meindert Talma, De Kift, at the close of every day, Andre Manuel, Mondo Leone and D’r Sjaak, Spinvis was part of the NL Impressionisten. In groups of two, the artists performed for a number of months throughout the Netherlands, starting on 18 March 2006. Two days later JA! was released, the 100th Excelsior Recordings release. Spinvis recorded it with poet Simon Vinkenoog and Arjan Witte (keys). The men played several dates in support of the album: Rotterdam, Antwerp, Groningen and Drachten were visited. Following this Spinvis and Vinkenoog wasted no time and performed the show De Suikerklok (The Sugar Clock). In the summer, Spinvis and his band performed at Lowlands, Waterpop and Folk Dranouter amongst other festivals.

== Musical style ==
Spinvis' music has been described as indietronica and compared to the likes of Air, Grandaddy and The Notwist. He writes songs solely in his native Dutch language. He has said, "If I were to use English, it would be artificial, it wouldn't be me. I’d have to sing in a language I know exclusively from films and TV. Luckily, in Dutch, you can only imitate yourself." His lyrics are usually written in a stream of consciousness manner. While he says he does not write 'protest songs', his music has criticised topics such as vivisection, ageism, greed and voyeurism in the media.

== Personal life ==
Spinvis lives in Nieuwegein. He is married and has two children.

== Discography ==
=== Albums ===
==== Studio albums ====
Title	Album details	Peak chart positions		Certifications
Title	Album details	NLD	BEL (FL)	Certifications
Spinvis	Released: 1 April 2002; Label: Excelsior Recordings	27	159	NVPI: Gold
Dagen van gras, dagen van stro	Released: 28 November 2005; Label: Excelsior Recordings	12	49	
Goochelaars & geesten	Released: 27 August 2007; Label: Excelsior Recordings	4	19	
Tot ziens, Justine Keller	Released: 4 November 2011; Label: Excelsior Recordings	5	28	
Trein, vuur, dageraad	Released: 28 April 2017; Label: Excelsior Recordings	5	5	
7.6.9.6.	Released: 2 November 2020; Label: Excelsior Recordings	1	8	
Be-bop-a-lula	Released: 7 April 2023; Label: Excelsior Recordings	3	13	

==== Live albums ====
Title	Album details	Peak chart positions		Certifications
Title	Album details	NLD	BEL (FL)	Certifications
Nieuwegein aan zee	Released: 1 December 2003; Label: Excelsior Recordings	54	—	NVPI: Gold

==== Collaborative albums ====
Title	Album details	Peak chart positions	
Title	Album details	NLD	BEL (FL)
Ja! (with Vinkenoog)	Released: 20 March 2006; Label: Excelsior Recordings	—	—
Ritmebox (with Vinkenoog)	Released: 14 July 2008; Label: Excelsior Recordings	77	—

==== Compilation album ====
Title	Album details
Omnibus	Released: 3 February 2017; Label: Excelsior Recordings
Lutke Krub en zeven kerstliedjes	Released: 14 November 2024; Label: Excelsior Recordings

=== Singles ===
Single	Year	Peak chart positions		Album
Single	Year	NLD Dutch Top 40	NLD Single Top 100	Album
"Smalfilm"	2002	—	95	Spinvis
"Voor ik vergeet"	2002	—	—	Spinvis
"Bagagedrager"	2003	tip20	75	Spinvis
"Het voordeel van video"	2005	—	60	Dagen van gras, dagen van stro
"Ik wil alleen maar zwemmen"	2006	—	91	Dagen van gras, dagen van stro
"Flamingo"	2006	—	—	Dagen van gras, dagen van stro
"Oostende"	2011	—	—	Tot ziens, Justine Keller
"Kom terug"	2011	—	77	Tot ziens, Justine Keller
