= Caesar (band) =

Dutch indie rock band

- Origin: Amsterdam, Netherlands
- Genres: Indie rock
- Years active: 1994–2010
- Label: Excelsior Recordings
- Members: Roald van Oosten; Marit de Loos; Sem Bakker
- Website: Official website

Caesar was a Dutch indie rock trio from Amsterdam, consisting of Roald van Oosten, Marit de Loos and Sem Bakker. The band was founded in 1994. Caesar released four studio albums, plus one retrospective release in 2006, Before My Band Explodes. The band was dissolved in 2008.

== History ==
=== Early days ===
In 1994 Roald van Oosten and Marit de Loos thought of starting a band together. Later that year Van Oosten met Sem Bakker. They discussed the idea that De Loos and Van Oosten have and Bakker agreed to join on bass. After a month of playing together the trio released their first demo.

The following year three more demos followed. The band was swiftly improving and Excelsior Recordings (then still known as (Nothing sucks like) Electrolux) noticed. It is for this label that the band recorded its first single Goodbye To Barruschna, it was released on vinyl in the fall of 1995.

=== Clean ===
Caesar's debut album Clean, was released in May 1996. It was the first official album release of the Excelsior Recordings label. Upon its release in June, Clean was received enthusiastically by the press, even appearing in the Moordlijst, the chart of music magazine OOR.

=== No Rest For the Alonely ===
In 1998 the band played at Noorderslag, Pinkpop and Lowlands, three of the biggest Dutch festivals. The band was also judged as most promising new act of the year and received a Zilveren Harp, a prestigious Dutch award. In March the band's second album No Rest for the Alonely was released in the Netherlands . It was a success and its first single Situations Complications receives a lot of airplay. Later that year the album was also released in the United Kingdom with a slightly different title, No Rest for the Lonely. Following this release the band toured the UK under the banner of British music magazine Melody Maker.

=== Leaving Sparks ===
In September Caesar flew to Chicago to work with producer Steve Albini to record their third album, Leaving Sparks. In the meantime an acoustic version of Before My Head Explodes was included on the collection cd Twee Meter Sessie NL 1. The band also plays a set on the accompanying TV show. Leaving Sparks is released in March 2000.

=== Caesar ===
In early 2001, after a break of a six months, Caesar starts recording demo tracks for their upcoming self-titled album. In May the band plays as support act for US musician Stephen Malkmus. A year later the fictional rockumentary Shooting Stars is released. Two years earlier the band had participated in a 12-day shoot, playing a famous Dutch pop group. This pop group is the main focus of this feature film directed by Ronen Abas and Guy Mel.

Marien Dorleijn leaves Caesar in December to focus more on his main band Nimbus. He does play on the band's fourth album released in the following year. This self-titled album marks a return to the raucous and energetic sound of the band's debut album.

== Discography ==
- Clean (1996)
- No Rest for the Alonely (1998)
- Leaving Sparks (2000)
- Caesar (2003)
- Before My Band Explodes (2006)
