= Hallo Venray =

Dutch rock band

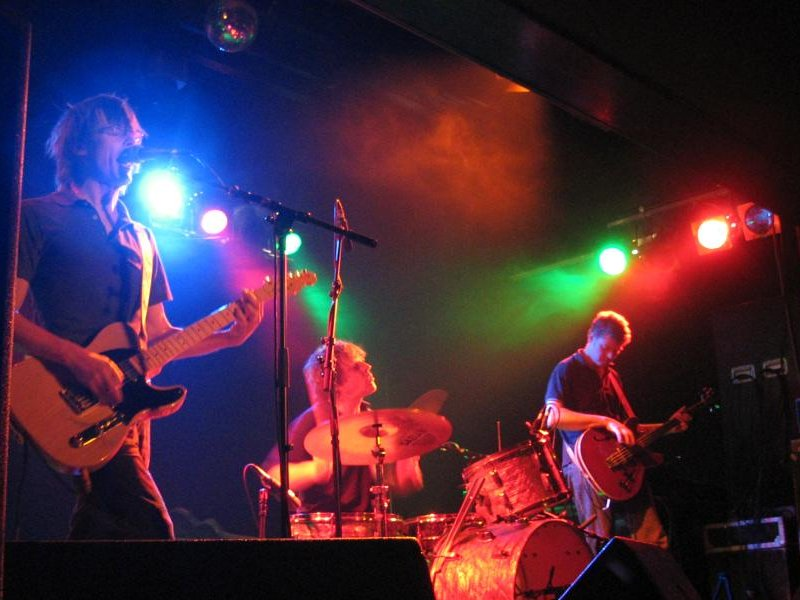
- Hallo Venray in 2005

Background information
- Origin: The Netherlands
- Genres: Rock
- Years active: 1985- present
- Labels: Excelsior Recordings
- Members: Henk Koorn – guitar, vocals Henk Jonkers - drums Peter Konings – bass guitar
- Website: Official website

Hallo Venray (Dutch pronunciation: [ɦɑˈloː ˈvɛnraːi]) is a guitar rock band from The Hague in the Netherlands. The band is a mainstay in the Dutch rock scene and has produced a number of successful albums of which Coffee and cake (2022) is the latest.

== Biography ==
Hallo Venray was founded in 1985 by Henk Koorn and Toon Moerland. Together with drummer Dim Veldhuizen the band released its debut album, You Don’t Hit a Guy With Glasses On, in 1989. In 1990, a follow-up album King was released. It was with the band's third record, The More I Laugh, The Hornier Due Gets, that the band's star began to rise. Released in 1992, the album received a lot of airplay on Dutch national radio stations. The band toured extensively in their home country, with Pinkpop as a crowning achievement.

A Million Planes to Fly (1993), the band's fourth record, built on this success. The band played a number of international shows, including supporting the band Texas in France.

By 1995, the band's popularity had waned, and the album Merry-Go-Round failed to live up to the success of the previous two. Two years later, Hallo Venray released a self-titled album, showing off a more modern sound with samples and electronic instruments. After this album, the band became less active. In 1998, drummer Dim Veldhuizen left and was replaced by Henk Jonkers.

The group's members dedicated their time to side projects in the following years. During this period rumors of a possible break-up arose. But with 2000's album I’m Not a Senseless Person, At Least I Don’t Want To Be, Hallo Venray returned. In 2003, the album, which was originally released only in the Netherlands, received a UK release on the Lo-Max label.

The co-operation with Lo-Max didn't last long, as that same year the band signed with Excelsior Recordings. Together with that label's staff producer Frans Hagenaars, the band began recording in November 2003, resulting, two years later, in the release of Vegetables and Fruit. The CD was presented in Paradiso, Amsterdam on January 23. This show lands the band an extensive club tour through the Netherlands.

In 2008, the double CD Leather on My Soul was released by Excelsior Recordings. This album contains each song twice: An acoustic version on one CD and an electric version on the other. In 2017, Hallo Venray released their most recent album Where Is The Funky Party?.
