= 4 (Johan album) =

Studio album by Johan
- Released: May 4, 2009
- Genre: Pop
- Label: Excelsior Recordings

Johan chronology
| THX JHN (2006) | 4 (2009) |

Professional ratings
Review scores
| Source | Rating |
|---|---|
| PopMatters | 5/10 stars |

4 (pronounced Four) is the fourth studio album by Johan, released on 30 April 2009. Johan previously released new records every five years, but 4 was released only 3 years after THX JHN on the Excelsior Recordings label.

The first single of the album, In The Park, first aired on 3FM on April 6, 2009.

== Track listing ==
1. "In The Park"
2. "Something About You"
3. "Maria"
4. "Comes A Time"
5. "The Receiving End"
6. "Together Now"
7. "World Game # 10"
8. "Alone Again"
9. "Over"
10. "Why Don't We"

== Personnel ==
- Jacco de Greeuw – lead singer, guitar
- Maarten Kooijman – guitar, backing vocals
- Diets Dijkstra – guitar (1999), bass, backing vocals
- Jeroen Kleijn – drums
