= André Manuel =

Dutch singer and performer (born 1966)

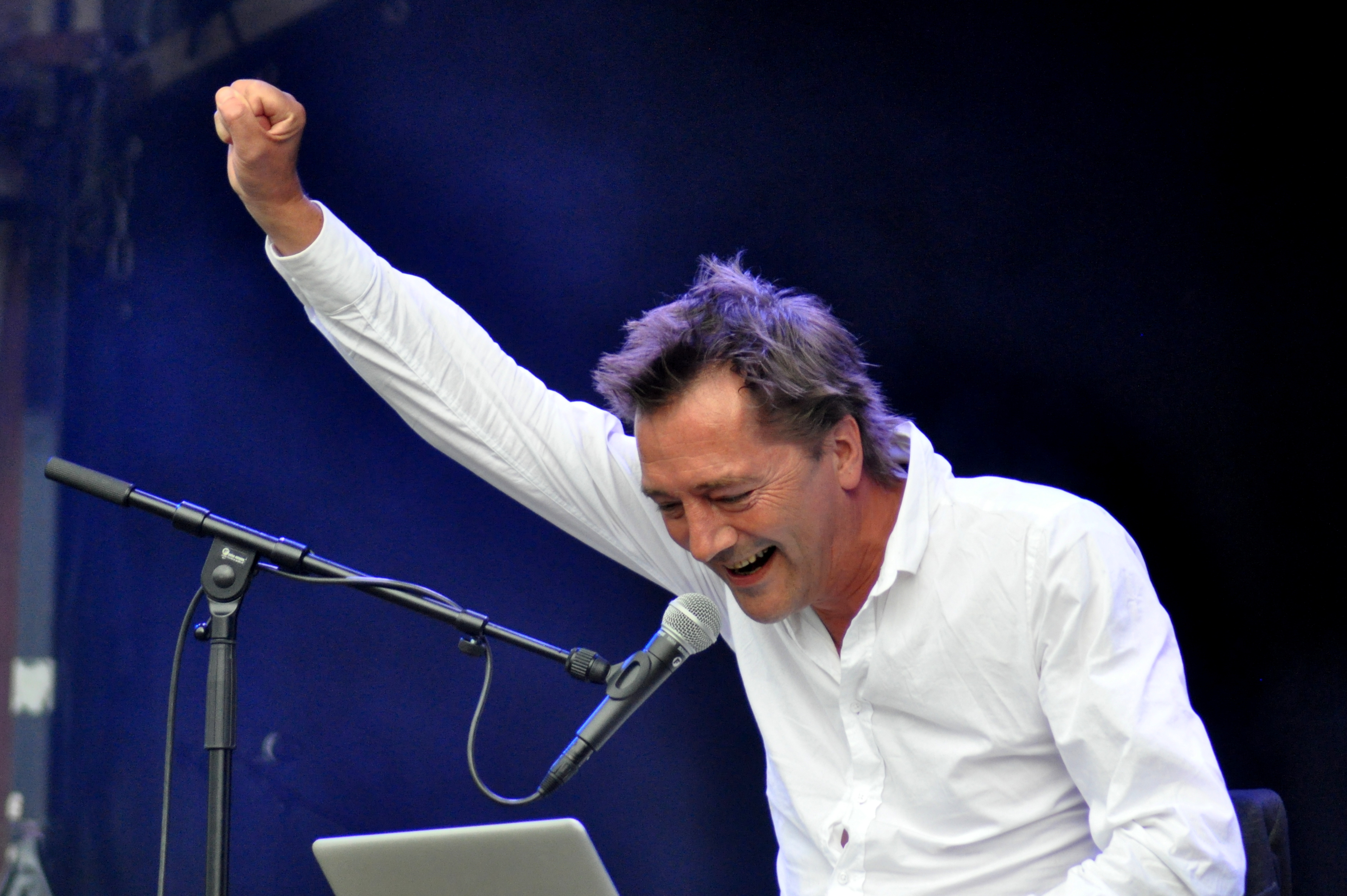
- Image of André Manuel

Background information
- Born: 1966 (age 58–59); Diepenheim, Overijssel
- Occupation(s): Singer, comedian, author
- Years active: 1985–present
- Website: www.maneman.nl

André Manuel (born 1966 in Diepenheim, Overijssel) is a Dutch singer and performer. Manuel sings in his regional dialect, and is known for his critical and sometimes cryptic lyrics.

His first band was called Fratsen (meaning antics in Dutch), formed in 1985. After that group disbanded, he formed Krang, in 1996; they were nominated for an Edison Award in 2000.

Krang split in 2004, and Manuel continued to perform as a solo artist, and published a book entitled Het Tragische Einde Van De Nederlander Zoals Wij Hem Kennen ("The Tragic End Of The Dutchman As We Know Him"). In 2015 Manuel won the Poelifinario Award, an important Dutch award for theatrical artists.

Fratsen reunited in 2014 and released the album Caspar. They went on tour, and released a second album, Spookt, in 2017.
