= Solo (Dutch band) =

- Origin: Netherlands
- Genres: Singer songwriter, pop
- Years active: 2003– present
- Label: Excelsior Recordings
- Members: Michiel Flamman; Simon Gitsels
- Website: solopeople.net

Solo is the musical outfit of Dutch musicians Michiel Flamman and Simon Gitsels. The duo released four albums, of which Solopeople was the biggest success. The album was released on label Excelsior Recordings and spawned a Dutch top 20 hit with "Come Back To Me".

== Biography ==
=== Songs ’n Sounds (2003–2005) ===
In 2003, Flamman and Gitsels formed the group. Both were already involved in the music industry; Flamman performed under the name J. Perkin and wrote songs for other artists, while Gitsels worked as a session musician for Mathilde Santing and Birgit.

A year later, the duo signed with Excelsior Recordings, releasing its debut album Songs ‘n Sounds on 16 August. The record was produced by Martijn Groeneveld and contains contributions from Minco Eggersman (at the close of every day), Rowin Tettero (Mindmeners) and Marg van Eenbergen (Seedling). The latter two also played with Flamman and Gitsels during live shows. In November, Solo received an Essent award.

=== Solopeople (2005–2006) ===
In January 2005, Solo performed at Noorderslag. In February, the band supported Spinvis on his Lotus Europa tour, playing throughout the Netherlands. At the end of April, Solo entered the studio to record their second album. The recording sessions finished in November. On the radio show 2 Meter Sessies, the band previewed a number of tracks. At the end of the year, Solo recorded a cover version of de "Pingpongsong" for a tribute album for Dutch singer Herman van Veen.

Solopeople, the band's second album, was released in January 2006. The Dutch press received the record well, and the band made appearances in popular Dutch TV shows such as Barend & Van Dorp and De Wereld Draait Door. The band sold out the rock club Ekko in Utrecht three times within a month. In the summer of 2006, the band played at the Lowlands music festival twice. Solopeople's second single "Opportunities" followed in September.

=== Before We Part (2007–2008) ===
In 2007, Solo worked on new material and played at Touring Theater Festival De Parade. They also played songs written by Dutch composer Harry Bannink along with other musicians for the seventies television show De Stratemakeropzeeshow. In October, Solo headed for the studio. The recordings were finished in April 2008 after working with Scott Solter and Aaron Prellwitz at Tiny Telephone Studios in San Francisco, California.

When the record was released in November, Flamman was the sole member of the band. The album title refers to the breakup of the band.

In 2025, Solo reunited after a fifteen-year hiatus to release their final album, New Men. It was announced that Flamman suffers from terminal lung cancer. The band will perform a final show in Tivoli-Vrendenburg in Utrecht on October 2, 2025.
