= Jacob de Greeuw =

Dutch singer & singer-songwriter (born 1969)

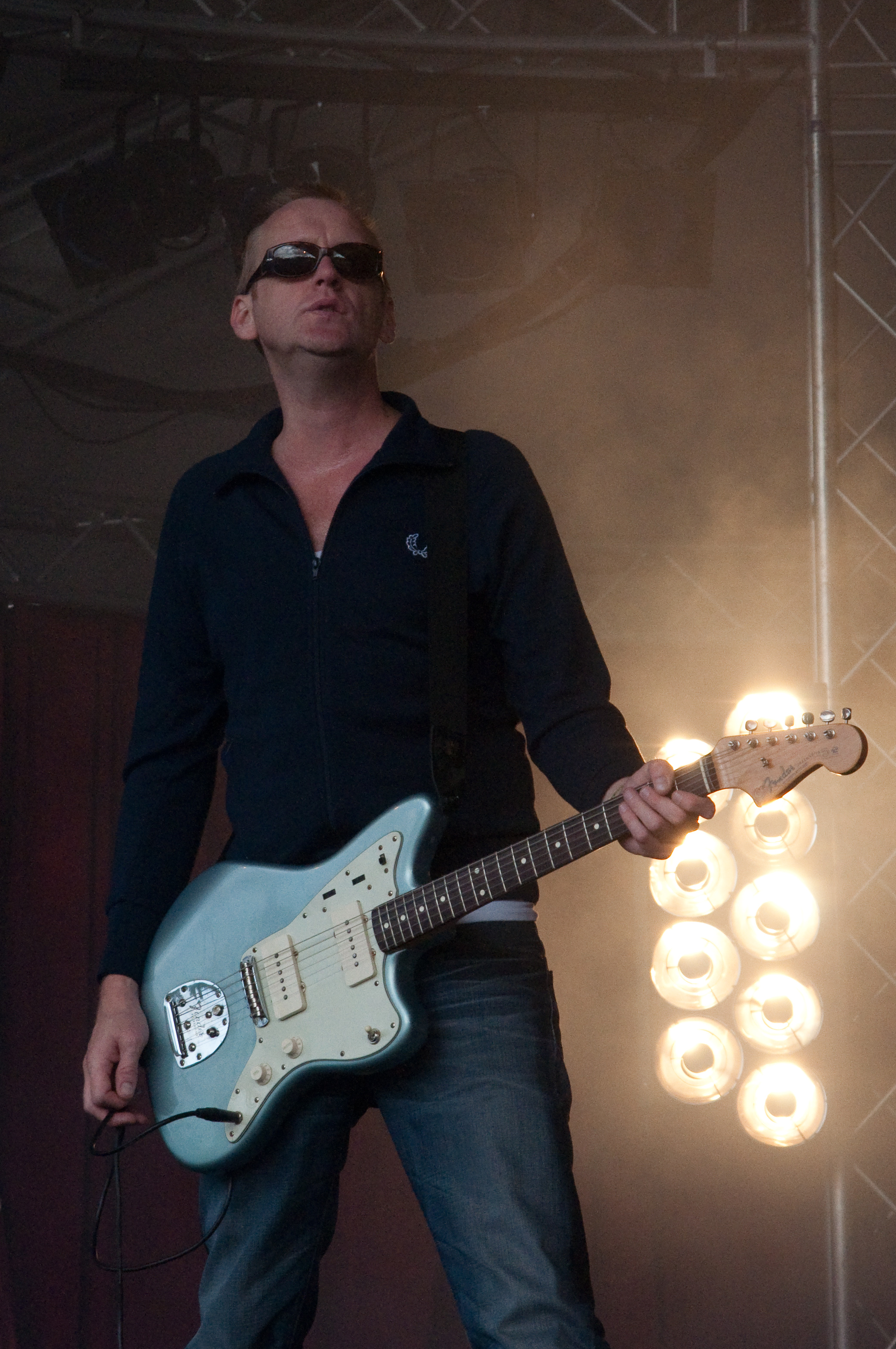
- Born: 1969 (age 55–56); Hoorn
- Occupation: Musician
- Years active: 1996–present

Jacob "Jacco" de Greeuw (born 1969) is a Dutch singer, songwriter and musician who is most well known as being the driving force behind Dutch rock band Johan. He founded the band in 1996.

== Biography ==
Jacob de Greeuw was born in 1969 in Hoorn.

De Greeuw has long suffered from depression.

He is married and lives in Amsterdam.
