= Johan (band) =

Dutch band

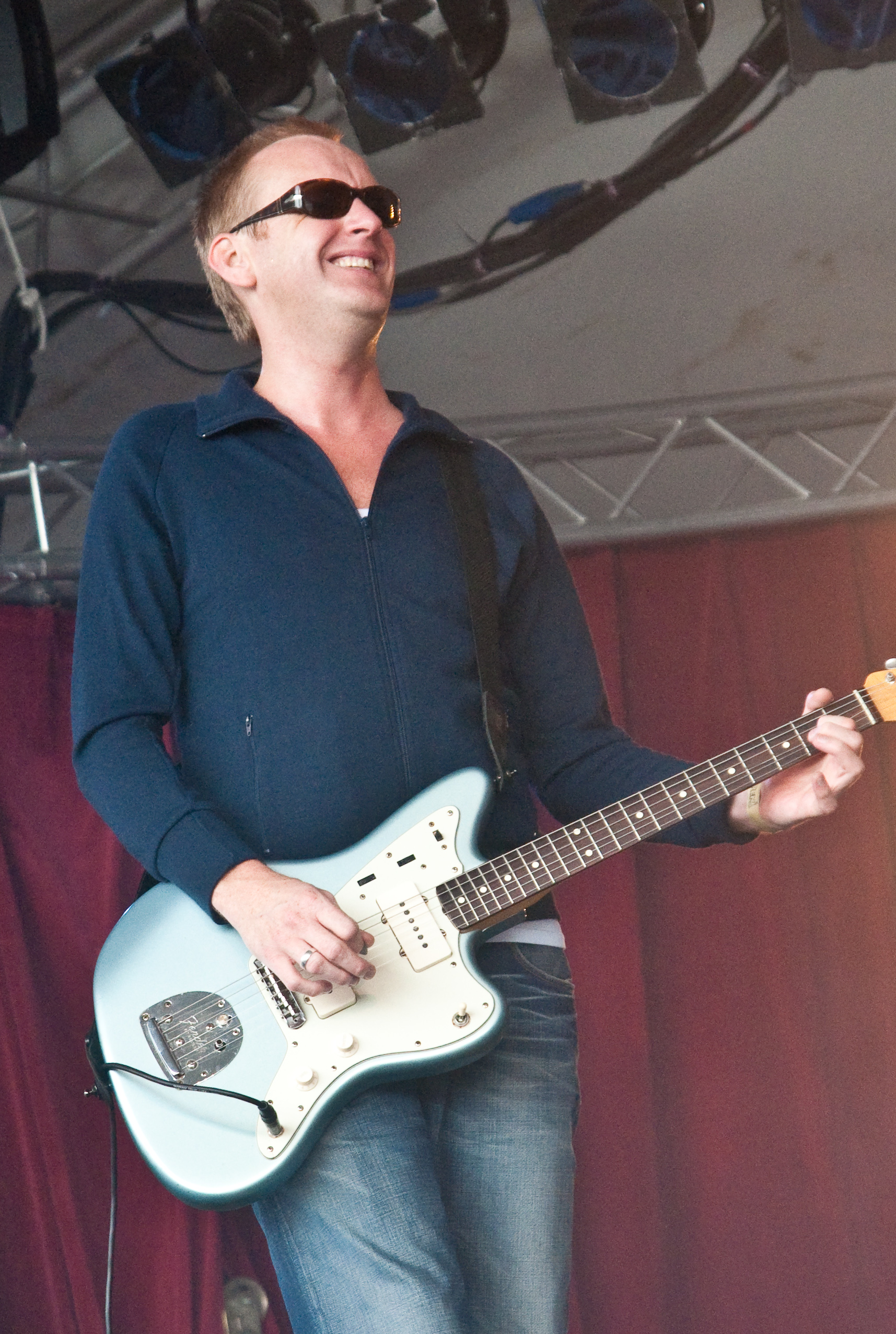

Background information
- Also known as: Visions of Johanna (1992–1996)
- Origin: Hoorn, Netherlands
- Genres: Alternative rock; Power pop; Indie rock
- Years active: 1996–2009, 2018–present
- Label: Excelsior Recordings
- Spinoff of: Little Mary Big
- Members: Jacco de Greeuw; Diets Dijkstra; Jeroen Kleijn; Robin Berlijn
- Past members: Remco Krull; Niels de Wit; Wim Kwakman; David Corel; Diederik Nomden; Maarten Kooijman
- Website: johan4all.com

Johan (stylized as JOHAN or JHN) is a Dutch indie rock band from Hoorn, North Holland. The band has released six albums to date, and has had a rotating lineup over the years, with lead singer and guitarist Jacco de Greeuw being the only consistent member.

== History ==
Jacco de Greeuw founded Thank God For Us in the late eighties, after having played in several other bands. The band was renamed Little Mary Big when joined by Marike Groot. With this band, he reached second place at the Grote Prijs van Nederland, a Dutch music competition. However, arguments with vocalist Marike Groot led to the band breaking up. De Greeuw subsequently formed the band Visions of Johanna, named after the Bob Dylan song of the same name. In 1992 the band competed in the Grote Prijs competition and reached the semi-finals.

After some changes in the lineup, the band signed with Excelsior Recordings in 1995 and released the single "Swing". One year later, the band's name was shortened to Johan, a reference to footballer Johan Cruyff. Under this name the band released its self-titled debut album. The album was received well by Dutch critics and became a modest commercial success.

SpinART Records signed the band for the US region. When record executive Seymour Stein heard the band's music he became interested, and traveled to the Netherlands to hear the band play. He wanted to release the album on Sire Records. The CDs had already been pressed with the Sire label, but for unknown reasons the deal was cancelled at the last moment, and the CDs were destroyed.

The band planned to record a new album in 1998, but De Greeuw's clinical depression took its toll. Three more years would pass before Pergola was released in 2001. The album received positive reviews and got a lot of airplay on national radio stations. That summer Johan performed at music festival Pinkpop. The following year the band won an Edison Award for Best National Pop Group.

After an international tour, hardly any news was heard from Johan until 2004, when members Wim Kwakman and Diederik Nomdem left the band. Jeroen Kleijn became the band's new drummer, and Diets Dijkstra became the band's bassist. After this, Johan started playing live again, and recorded its third album, Thx Jhn, which was released in May 2006.

The first single of the album, "Oceans", became a commercial success. This was helped by the song's video, in which an actual fan from Argentina travels from her home country to the Netherlands to see Johan play live. The theme of fans thanking Johan is also applied to the album's booklet, where various fans from other countries appear. The single peaked at 67 on the Dutch Single Top 100, and stayed on the chart for 6 weeks.

Johan played a sold-out club tour and released two more successful singles, "Walking Away" and "She's Got A Way With Men". Through a deal with V2 Records the album was also released in Germany and Italy.

The fourth album, titled 4, was scheduled to be released on 22 December 2008, but was eventually released on 30 April 2009, three years after Thx Jhn, and thus breaking with the tradition of a new record being released every five years.

On 26 August 2009 Johan announced they were disbanding at the end of 2009, with de Greeuw declaring that he wanted to pursue different musical ventures. The band went on a farewell tour called "The Last Round" and on 22 December they played their last show at Paradiso in Amsterdam. At this show they received a gold record for Pergola.

On 11 January 2018 the band's new album Pull Up was announced. It was released on 13 April 2018. It is the bands highest charting album to date, peaking at 6 on the Dutch Album Top 100, and staying on the chart for 6 weeks. The band performed the song "About Time" at De Wereld Draait Door, a Dutch talk show, to promote the album.

On 4 March 2022 Johan announced that the latest tour would be cancelled, citing the COVID-19 pandemic restrictions in place at the time.

The band's latest album, titled The Great Vacation, was released on January 26 2024. It was the first album not exclusively written by de Greeuw, instead he and guitarist Robin Berlijn wrote all the songs on the album together. In a run-up to the release of the album, a mini documentary was released about the creative process that went in to making the album.

== Line-up ==
=== Current members ===
- Jacco de Greeuw: lead singer, guitar (1996–2009, 2018–present)
- Diets Dijkstra: guitar (1999), bass, backing vocals (1999–2009, 2018–present)
- Jeroen Kleijn: drums (2004–2009, 2018–present)
- Robin Berlijn: guitar (2018–present)

=== Live members ===
- Matthijs van Duijvenbode: keyboard (2007–2009)
- Jan Teertstra: keyboard, backing vocals (2018–present)

=== Former members ===
- Remco Krull: guitar (1996–1998)
- Niels de Wit: bass (1996–1998)
- Wim Kwakman: drums (1996–2004)
- David Corel: bass, backing vocals (1999–2001)
- Diederik Nomden: guitar, keyboard (1999–2004)
- Maarten Kooijman: guitar, backing vocals (2000–2009)

== Discography ==
=== Albums ===
==== Studio albums ====
| Title | Release date | Peak chart positions on the Dutch Album Top 100 | Number of weeks | Certification |
|---|---|---|---|---|
| Johan | 4 November 1996 | - | - | |
| Pergola | 23 April 2001 | 48 | 17 | Gold |
| Thx Jhn | 22 May 2006 | 13 | 20 | |
| 4 | 4 May 2009 | 11 | 9 | |
| Pull Up | 13 April 2018 | 6 | 6 | |
| The Great Vacation | 26 January 2024 | 5 | 1 | |

==== Compilation album ====
| Title | Release date | Peak chart position | Number of weeks |
|---|---|---|---|
| 12.5 Years, 3 Albums, 36 Songs | 29 January 2009 | 68 | 3 |

=== Singles ===
| Title | Release date | Peak chart positions on the Single Top 100 | Album |
|---|---|---|---|
| "Swing" | 25 November 1996 | - | Johan |
| "Everybody Knows" | 17 March 1997 | 99 | Johan |
| "December" | 4 August 1997 | - | Johan |
| "Pergola" | 26 March 2001 | - | Pergola |
| "Tumble and Fall" | 25 June 2001 | 76 | Pergola |
| "Day Is Done" | 2001 | 87 | Pergola |
| "Oceans" | 22 May 2006 | 67 | THX Jhn |
| "Walking Away" | 17 August 2006 | 36 | THX Jhn |
| "She's Got A Way With Men" | 20 November 2006 | - | THX Jhn |
| "Coming In From the Cold" | 2007 | - | THX Jhn |
| "In The Park" | 2009 | - | 4 |
| "About Time" | 22 February 2018 | - | Pull Up |
| "Cincinnati" | 23 October 2023 | - | The Great Vacation |
| "So It Goes" | 3 November 2023 | - | The Great Vacation |
| "Time For Change" | 5 January 2024 | - | The Great Vacation |

=== Videography ===
==== Music videos ====
| Title | Year | Director(s) | Notes |
|---|---|---|---|
| "Everybody Knows" | 1997 | | From the album "Johan" |
| "Tumble and Fall" | 2001 | Johan Kramer Kessels Kramer | From the album "Pergola" |
| "Oceans" | 2006/2007 | | |
| "Walking Away" | 2006 | | From the album "THX Jhn" |
| "Cincinnati" | 2023 | Amalia de la Vega (AI artist) | The video for this song was created with the help of AI. Finalist for the Fall 2023 Music Video Awards. |
| "So it Goes" | 2023 | Diets Dijkstra Robin Berlijn | From the album "The Great Vacation" |

==== Documentary ====
| Title | Release date | Director | Additional information |
|---|---|---|---|
| The Great Vacation Mini Docu | 24 January 2024 | Diets Dijkstra Robin Berlijn | Filmed and edited by Diets Dijkstra |
