= Gem (Dutch band) =

Dutch rock band

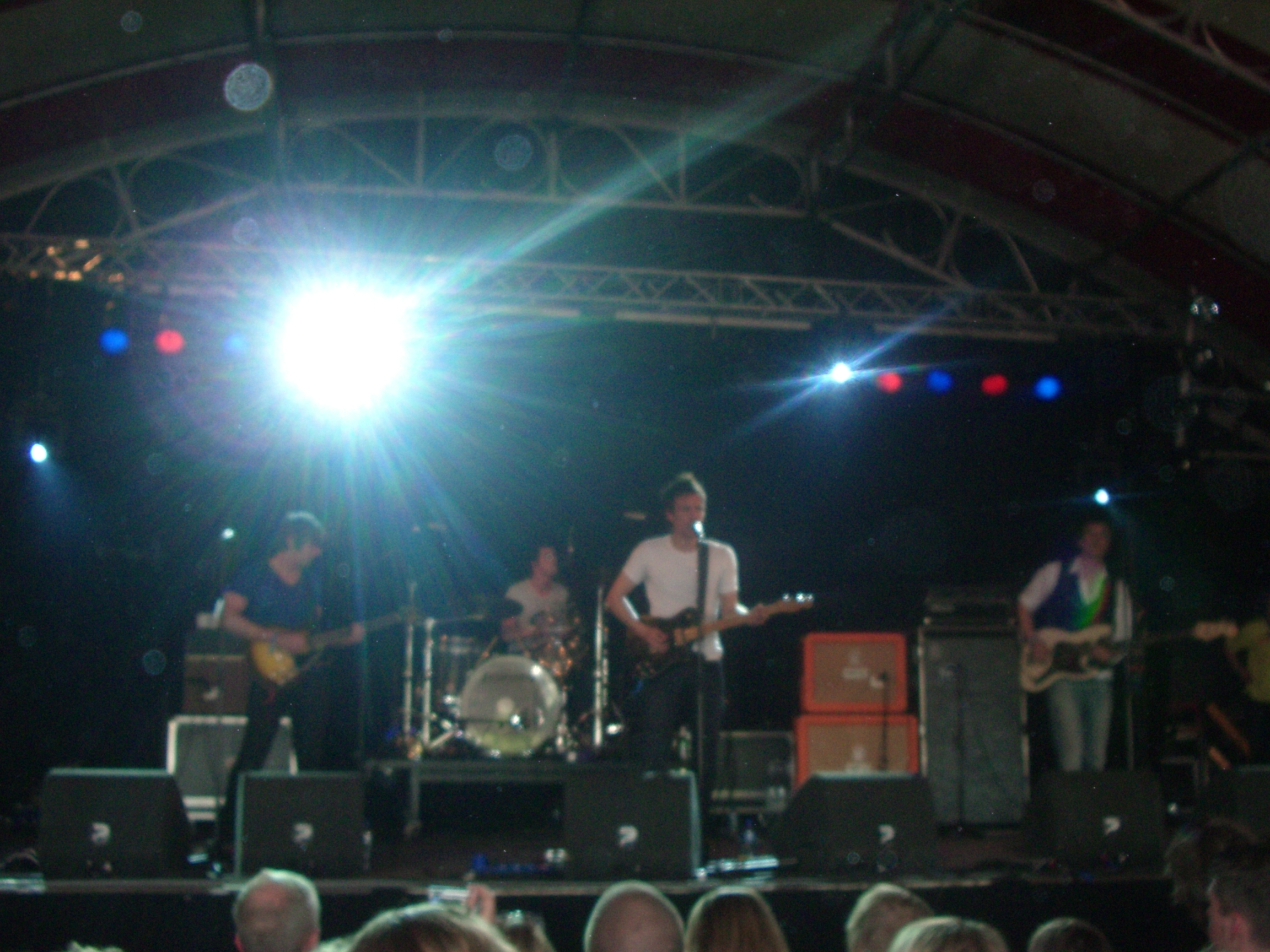
- Gem performing at bevrijdingsfestival Zwolle, 2008

Background information
- Origin: Utrecht, Netherlands
- Genres: Indie rock
- Years active: 2003 - present
- Labels: Excelsior Recordings
- Members: Maurits Westerik; Vincent Lemmen; Jeroen Kikkert; Wouter Rentema
- Website: Official website

Gem is a rock band from Utrecht, Netherlands. The five-piece band was founded in 2003, and has released four albums of which Hunters Go Hungry (2011) is the newest.

== History ==
In 2003 when singer Maurits Westerik joined with guitarist Bas de Graaff and bassist Vincent Lemmen. With the addition of second guitarist Simon Bonner the band recorded its first demo in Studio Moskou in Utrecht. Tony van Best drummed on the tracks.

Having heard that The Libertines were to play in the Melkweg in Amsterdam, Westerik sent links to some of their MP3s, and asked if the band could play as opening act. The programmers at the Melkweg agreed. The band were the subject of a feature story on the channel 3VOOR12, and were included in a compilation album in the Unsigned Series, an initiative of the Dutch Pop Institute. The record was called College Radio: Alternative Rock Songs. With two new band members, Jeroen Kikkert (bass) and Ilco Slikker (drums), the band recorded two tracks for the album the studio of producer Frans Hagenaars. They also toured for the Unsigned project with Eleven, zZz and other bands.

=== Tell Me What's New ===
GEM was invited by 3VOOR12 to play on their programme during the Noorderslag festival in 2004. The week before this performance, a two-page article was published in the national newspaper de Volkskrant. Frans Hagenaars and Excelsior Recordings offered the band a contract. To focus solely on the music, the members quit their studies at college. Shortly before the band entered the studio with Hagenaars, the band decided to replace Simon Bonner with former member Vincent Lemmen, with whom the band recorded its debut album ‘’Tell Me What’s New’’. In June the band played its first international gig at the goNORTH festival in Aberdeen, Scotland. Later that summer the band also played several festivals in the Netherlands, including Music In My Head, Metropolis and Lowlands, and in Germany at the Haldern Pop Festival. In September the band played a short Dutch tour with labelmates zZz. The song This Is Your Life was featured on the soundtrack of the Dutch movie De Dominee (‘The Pastor’). In early October GEM was one of several Dutch bands. Several Sub Pop representatives attended the band's performance.

In January 2005 GEM appeared again at the Noorderslag festival. The German TV station WDR recorded the band's performance. The show, together with and an interview, was aired in February on the channel's Rockpalast show. Consecutively Tell Me What's New was released on the German Haldern Pop Records, with a new cover. After a performance at the German club Frannz, the band made a German tour including shows in Cologne, Hamburg, and Frankfurt.

=== Escapades ===
During the summer of 2005 the band started work on their second release. The song ‘Good To Know You’ was used as the backing track of a high rotation TV commercial. Written by songwriters Billinger and Marsman, the track was the band's first successful single. With Spider Rico, a split single was released which was only for sale at several concert dates. In December and January GEM toured Germany again.

Shortly before the release of the band's second release Escapades the band played three set at the Noorderslag weekend in early 2006. Following these performances, GEM played at SXSW in Austin, Texas. British booking office ITB signed the band while at this US festival.

In February the band's second album Escapades was released. It received positive reviews from critics, and performed well in the Dutch charts. ITB arranged for several UK performances, including a show at The Great Escape Festival in Brighton. In addition to this GEM supported Editors at the Ambassador Theatre in Dublin, Ireland.

In December drummer Ilco Slikker and guitarist Bas de Graaff decided to leave the band, citing personal reasons, and was replaced by Wouter Rentema. The band plans to record the new album as a four-piece.

== Discography ==
Albums

- Tell Me What's New (2004)
- Escapades (2006)
- New (2008)
- GEMUnited (4CD Box) (2009)
- Hunters Go Hungry (2011)

Singles

- Tonight (1 Track Radio Promo) (June 2004)
- Rise & Fall / The Blitz (Limited 2 Track 7" Vinyl) (December 2004)
- Good To Know You / All We Have Is Now / Rise & Fall (Live) (3 Track Single) (September 2005)
- Go! / High-Low / Rush For You (3 Track Single) (February 2006)
- The Subterranean Parade (1 Track Promo CD Single) (August 2006)
- The Subterranean Parade (3 Track CD Single) (August 2006)
- The Subterranean Parade / All I Want For Christmas is You (Split Limited 4 Track 7" Single With Spider Rico)(December 2006)
- Look (1 Track Single) (March 2008)
- Blisters (1 Track Single) (July 2008)
- She Said Oh Oh Oh I Said Yeah Yeah Yeah (2 Track 7" Vinyl Single) (October 2008)
- Gimme (1 Track Single) (June 2009)

== Band members ==
=== Current members ===
Maurits Westerik – vocals
Vincent Lemmen – guitar
Jeroen Kikkert – bass
Wouter Rentema - Drums

=== Former members ===
Ilco Slikker – drums
Bas de Graaff - Guitar
Tony van Best – drums
Simon Bonner – guitar
