= Excelsior Recordings =

Dutch independent record label

- Founded: 1996
- Founder: Ferry Roseboom, Frans Hagenaars
- Distributor: V2 Records
- Genre: Various
- Country of origin: Netherlands
- Location: Amsterdam, Brooklyn
- Official website: https://www.excelsior-recordings.com/

Excelsior Recordings is an independent record label located in Amsterdam, Netherlands. The label has over 400 releases.

== History ==
Excelsior was founded by Ferry Roseboom and Frans Hagenaars under the name "Nothing Sucks Like Electrolux", releasing a few limited-run seven-inch singles in 1995. The name Excelsior was adopted in 1996 after the label was acquired by MCA Records as a subsidiary for releasing alternative rock albums in the Low Countries. By 2001, the label had acquired a distributor in the United States, Sure Fire Recordings. The label was later acquired by V2 Records.

== Artists ==
- Absynthe Minded
- Alamo Race Track
- Alex Roeka
- Anne Soldaat
- Awkward i
- Bauer
- Beans & Fatback (band)
- Benjamin B
- Caesar
- Claw Boys Claw
- Cloud Cafe
- Daily Bread
- Daryll-Ann
- De Staat
- Do-The-Undo
- Eckhardt
- El Pino & the Volunteers
- Fixkes
- GEM
- Ghost Trucker
- Green Hornet
- Hallo Venray
- The Heights
- The Herb Spectacles
- Hospital Bombers
- Jacco Gardner
- Johan
- Lefties Soul Connection
- Liam Finn
- Lola Kite
- LPG
- Meindert Talma & the Negroes
- Moss
- Ploegendienst (band)
- Roosbeef
- Scram C Baby
- Solo
- Speed 78
- Spinvis
- Supersub
- Tangarine
- The Kik
- Tim Knol
- Traumahelikopter
- Triggerfinger
- Under byen
- Véras Fawaz
- zZz
