= List of Dutch hip-hop musicians =

This is a list of Dutch hip hop musicians.

- Ali B - Born in Zaanstad of Moroccan descent, Ali B has been described as "perhaps the most popular rapper in the Netherlands".
- Appa
- Baas B
- Bizzey
- Boef
- Brainpower
- Brutus
- Cilvaringz
- Def Rhymz
- D-Men, a commercially successful hiphop group from Diemen, known for their American type of beats and their catchy deliveries. D-Men received some media attention after releasing their mixtapes Straatremixes.
- E-Life
- Eddy Fort Moda Grog
- Extince, one of the first Dutch language rappers to appear in the Dutch music charts.
- Feis Ecktuh
- Fouradi
- Gers Pardoel
- Hef
- Kempi
- Kraantje Pappie
- Lange Frans & Baas B are the core of the group D-Men
- Lijpe
- Lil' Kleine
- Mr Probz
- Murth The Man-O-Script
- Negativ
- OCritRevo
- Opgezwolle
- The Opposites
- Osdorp Posse - achieved commercial success and exerted great influence on the Dutch hip hop scene.
- Patrick Tilon
- Pete Philly and Perquisite
- Postmen - from Rotterdam, this successful (live) band mostly sing in English and combines various music styles such as reggae and hip hop.
- Raymzter
- Ray Slijngaard
- Remon Stotijn
- Salah Edin
- Tony Scott
- Typhoon
- U-Niq
- Winne
- Yes-R
