= Negativ =

Dutch rapper, actor and radio broadcaster

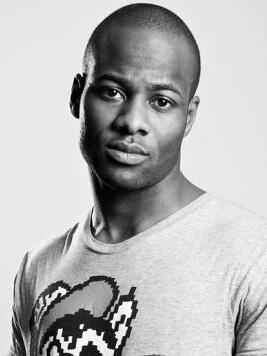
- Negativ

Background information
- Born: Maurits Robert Delchot; September 8, 1982 (age 44); Amsterdam, Netherlands
- Genre: Rap
- Occupations: Rapper, actor, radio presenter
- Instrument: Vocals
- Years active: 2000 – present
- Label: Nindo
- Website: www.negativmusic.nl

Maurits Robert Delchot better known by his stage name Negativ (born 8 September 1982) is a Dutch rapper, actor and radio broadcaster of Surinamese origin from Amsterdam-Oost.

Negativ became part of the rap formation D-Men. He has also acted films like Bolletjes Blues and Complexx. He also has his own weekly radio show where he DJs for Juize FM on Fridays.

== Beginnings ==
Maurits was interested at a very young age in rap. He started rapping with a bunch of friends, including Keizer and others. He took part in fNally's band H.S.S. (Hinderlijke Straat Schoften). Soon he became known in the underground rap circuit taking part in several MC battles. One big battle faced him with Yukkie B, another rapper from Amsterdam-Oost (East Amsterdam). This led into several quarrels between the two rappers, after which a series of diss tracks were sent back and forth between the two.

== 2003-2005: In D-Men ==
Negativ met Lange Frans already part of a band D-Men alongside his brother Brutus and Bart Zeilstra known as Baas B, and convinced him to join D-Men in 2003, where he contributed greatly to the popular mixtapes of D-Men which were distributed free in the Amsterdam rap circuits, and downloadable online via the website www.straatremixes.tk On two tracks on this mixtape, he dissed the rapper B Yukkie. After the success of the De Straatremixes in 2003, two new mixtapes, De Straatremixes Deel 2 and De Straatremixes Deel 3 were released in 2004 again with contributions from Negativ.

== Solo career ==
Shortly after the release of his single in January 2005, internal conflicts surfaced between Negativland and his two D-Men colleagues Lange Frans and Baas B who had now formed the duo Lange Frans & Baas B, so he decided to quit D-Men. A few weeks later, a Negativ made an online track and using an instrumental from 50 Cent, he dissed Lange Frans & Baas B. It was a time rampant of diss recordings including many from The Opposites, Rmxcrew and Tuindorp Hustler Click (THC) dissing other rap acts. Another battle ensued between Negativ and THC in which Negativ recorded "Dacht je nou echt" ("Did you really"). Rapper Heist Rockah also dissed Negativ back. Negative answers him with the song "Hou je bek" ("Shut up").

In 2005 Negativ took part also in the mixtape Urban Videoz and Straathits Volume 1 and Straathits Volume 2 with DJ MBA. On Loyalty Records he released the hit "Niets is wat het zijn moet" with Ebon-E. In 2005, he also had a joint single with Brutus in "Mijn Feestje"

In 2006 Negativ made his film debut, he plays the main character Spike in the movie Bolletjes Blues. For this role he was nominated for Golden Calf award at the Netherlands Film Festival in 2006.

In December 2006, Negativ received negative publicity after he was furious at the Tilburg festival threw a keyboard on the floor, resulting physical commotion to ensue.

In May 2008, during an interview with Propz Magazine, he confirmed that he had been recording tracks for the street remix 4 Mixtape, with other rappers Yes-R, Darryl, Lange Frans & Baas B. On September 26, 2008 mixtape Hinderlijk (Annoying) was released via Juize.FM radio station, also bringing the single "Money Money Buit Buit". The song also featured on a new Dutch television series called Flow. BUT eventually he withdrew his support from the project saying that there was no quarrel, but that "the only reason why I make music because I like and I do not do anything to make money or because it would be useful for my career."

He was offered a television role as a prisoner in the telefilm Skin, and he starred in the TV series Flow and entered into the program Back2School.

In 2009, he released a single "Skud Skuddem' with a remix single featuring Yes-R, Ali B, Sjaak. He also appeared in a TV documentary about angry people.

== Record label Nindo ==
In 2010 he founded his own record label Nindo, where he performed his mixtape Hinderlijker. Rapper Keizer, an old friend from earlier days also signed to the label. Later signed Bokoesam to the label

== Awards / Nomination ==
- Nominated in 2006 for Best actor Golden Calf award during the Netherlands Film Festival for his role in Bolletjes Blues

== Personal life ==
- Negativ became a father in 2006 of a daughter, Katie.

== Discography ==
=== Albums ===
Year	Album	Peak positions
Year	Album	NED
2006	Negativitijdperk	68

=== Mixtapes ===
- 2008: Hinderlijk Mixtape
- 2010: Hinderlijker Mixtape

=== Singles ===
Year	Single	Peak chart positions		Album
Year	Single	NED Dutch Top 40	NED Single Top 100	Album
2005	"Niets is wat het zijn moet" (feat. Ebon-E)	–	60	
2007	"Dingen gedaan"	–	–	

Other releases

- 2008: "Money money buit buit"
- 2009: "Skud skuddem" (feat Sjaak, Ali B & Yes-R)

Featured in

Year	Single	Peak chart positions		Album
Year	Single	NED Dutch Top 40	NED Single Top 100	Album
2005	"Mijn Feestje" (D-Men feat. Negativ & Brutus)	–	27	
2006	"Welkom in ons leven" (Bolletjes Blues Cast featuring Negativ, Raymzter, Derenzo, Mr. Probz and Kimo)	6 (Tipparade)	46	
2006	"Dat Is die Shit" (The Partysquad featuring Darryl, Nino, Negativ and Gio)	2 (Tipparade)	44	
2008	"Denk je dat ik gek ben" (The Partysquad featuring Negativ)	–	–	

== Collaboration with D-Men ==
All mixtape releases are on D-Men Entertainment

2003: De straatremixes

#	Title	Length	Rapper(s)
1	"Welkom (Intro)"	1:24	D-Men
2	"Schreeuw't uit"	2:42	DJ MBA, Lange Frans & Negativ
6	"Leipe shit"	2:54	Negativ & Baas B
8	"Smack je smoel"	4:33	Brutus, Negativ & Baas B
9	"Supernega"	2:08	Negativ
11	"Je bil"	3:10	Brutus, C-Ronic & Negativ

2004: De Straatremixes Deel 2

#	Title	Length	Rapper(s)
4	"Dubbel genaaid"	3:20	Negativ & Baas B
9	"Je bent geen tijger"	3:31	Lange Frans, Brutus, Negativ & Baas B
10	"Jij ziet er niet uit (Moe)"	4:28	Big Boi Caprice, Negativ & DJ MBA
11	"Bloedheet"	3:47	The Opposites, Negativ & Brutus
15	"Drop drop"	4:19	Brutus, Negativ & C-Ronic
16	"Zuip anthem"	3:26	Lange Frans, Negativ & Baas B
18	"Niet fokken"	4:46	Brutus, C-Ronic, Yes-R, Negativ & Brace

2004: De Straatremixes Deel 3

#	Title	Length	Rapper(s)
1	"Zeg Maar Niets"	3:37	Brutus, Yes-R & Negativ
6	"Krijger"	2:24	Brutus, Negativ & Brace
7	"Ren"	4:07	The Opposites & De Duivel
8	"Poeni"	2:49	Negativ & Brutus
10	"Waarschuwing 1"	2:40	Negativ & Yes-R
12	"Open sollicitaties"	3:27	Lange Frans, Negativ & DJ MBA
14	"Relex"	5:15	Darryl, Lange Frans, Big2 & Willy (of The Opposites), Negativ, Brace & Brutus
16	"Nokkie"	2:23	Negativ & Willy (of The Opposites)
17	"Mijn band"	4:18	Lange Frans, Baas B, Negativ, Brutus, Yes-R & Soesi B
18	"Fokking smerig"	3:12	Negativ & Brutus
19	"Blagai"	2:44	Negativ, Brutus & C-Ronic
22	"Bel me"	3:37	Ebon-E & Negativ

== Tracks on various compilation albums ==
2003: De Gastenlijst

#	Title	Length	Rapper(s)
1	"Zo!"	4:02	Negativ, Yes-R & Blix
6	"Wat wil je doen dan?"	2:59	Negativ
9	4 Specialisten	4:19	Negativ, Baas B, Lange Frans & Ali B

2004: Dope Shit

Title	Length	Rapper(s)
"Zo!"	4:02	Negativ, Yes-R & Blix
"4 Specialisten"	4:19	Negativ, Baas B, Lange Frans & Ali B

2005: De Beste Nederhop

Title	Length	Rapper(s)	Guest-rapper(s)/artist(s)
"Mijn Feestje"	3:32	D-Men	Negativ & Brutus
"Niets is wat het zijn moet"	3:58	Negativ	Ebon-E

2005: NL Flavour

#	Title	Length	Rapper(s)	Guest-rapper(s)/artist(s)
5	Niets is wat het zijn moet	3:58	Negativ	Ebon-E
12	"Mijn freestje"	3:32	D-Men	Negativ & Brutus
21	"Kijk eens om je heen!!"	4:19	Negativ	Ebon-E

== Tracks as a featured artist ==
2005: Yes-R - Mijn pad

#	Title	Length	Rapper(s)	Guest-rapper(s)/artist(s)
6	"Tienermoeders"	4:39	Yes-R	Negativ & Brainpower

2006: Kimo & Nina - De Nationale Overname Mixtape

#	Title	Length	Rapper(s)	Guest-rapper(s)/artist(s)
1	"Nationale overname"	4:17	Kimo & Nina	Excellent & Negativ
6	"Van Waterloo tot aan oost"	3:35	Kimo	Negativ
9	"De Waarheid" + Bonus-battles	28:58	Kimo	Negativ

2006: Nino - Transmigratie (mixtape)

#	Title	Length	Rapper(s)	Guest-rapper(s)/artist(s)
19	"Goede Ziel"	3:56	Nino	D Love & Negativ

2006: The Partysquad - De bazen van de club

#	Title	Length	Artist(s)	Guest-rapper(s)/artist(s)
5	"Ze Zeggen"	4:42	The Partysquad	Negativ & Peter Beense
10	"Dit is voor m'n boiz"	3:10	The Partysquad	Negativ & Darryl
15	"Dat is die shit"	3:43	The Partysquad	Daryll, Gio, Negativ & Nino

2007: Nino - Transmigratie 2

#	Title	Length	Artist(s)	Guest-rapper(s)/artist(s)
18	"Stijg op"	3:42	Nino	Negativ

2007: Nino - Transmigratie 3

#	Title	Length	Artist(s)	Guest-rapper(s)/artist(s)
11	"Geef geen moer"	4:31	Nino	Priester, Negativ & Sjaak

2008: The Partysquad - Total Los! De Mixtape Vol. 1

#	Title	Length	Artist(s)	Guest-rapper(s)/artist(s)
11	"Denk je dat ik gek ben"	2:10	The Partysquad	Negativ

2007: Reejon - Regen voor de storm

#	Title	Length	Artist(s)	Guest-rapper(s)/artist(s)
7	"Voel je de pijn"	3:25	Reejon	Negativ, Arzenio en Sjaak

2008/2009: Nino - Stilte Voor De Storm

#	Title	Length	Artist(s)	Guest-rapper(s)/artist(s)
10	"Fly als een Vogel"	3:29	Nino	Negativ

2009: Dicecream - De blaastest

#	Title	Length	Artist(s)	Guest-rapper(s)/artist(s)
15	"Business boven bitches"		Dicecream	Negativ, Nino and QF

2009: PUNA.NL - Propaganda

#	Title	Length	Rapper(s)	Producer(s)
18	"Zeg me niets"	2:43	Negativ	Boaz v/d Beatz

2009: Keizer - Straategisch

#	Title	Length	Artist(s)	Guest-rapper(s)/artist(s)
11	"Laat maar zitten"	2:54	Keizer	Negativ and Leo

2010: Keizer - De oorzaak II

#	Title	Length	Artist(s)	Guest-rapper(s)/artist(s)
11	"Dieper dan je man"	2:54	Keizer	Negativ and Leo

== Diss tracks ==
Negativ has been at both ends of dissing tracks between rappers. Here are his diss track recordings

Year	DissTrack by Negativ	Collaborating with	Targeted dissed artist	Answer Track
2005	"Dacht je nou echt"		T.H.C.	"Je wilt geen beef"
2003	"Schreeuw t' uit!" "Dat had je niet moeten doen"		Yukkie B	"Mien Dobbelsteen" "Slikke die hap"
2005	"Hou je bek bitch"		Heist-Rockah	"Speel niet tof"
2005	"Dit is wat je doet"	Kimo	D-Men (Lange Frans, Baas B, Brutus, Brace)	
2005	"D-Men diss"	Lexxxus, Kimo and C-ronic	T.H.C., D-Men, Brace, The Opposites	
2005	"De waarheid"	Kimo	D-Men, Ninthe	
2008	"Nega nakt je non stop"		Ali B, Brainpower, Dicecream, De Jeugd Van Tegenwoordig, The Opposites, Opgezwolle, Kees de Koning, Def Rhymz, Postmen, Raymzter, Extince, Kempi, D-Men, The Partysquad, Yukkie B, Gio	
2009	"O ik heb je Nike's"		Big2 (of The Opposites)	

== Film soundtracks ==
2006: Bolletjes Blues Original Soundtrack

#	Title	Length	Rapper(s)	Guest-rapper(s)/artist(s)
2	"Welkom in ons leven"	4:04	Bolletjes Blues Cast	Negativ, Raymzter, Mr. Probz & Kimo
6	"Alles"	2:32	Negativ	
8	"Voor Jou"	3:20	Negativ	
10	"Bolletjes Blues"	3:00	Mark Dakriet, Peter Beense, Dr. Johnny Love, Glenn Durfort, Kinroy Leeflang, Negativ & SugaCane	
11	"Plein battle"	3:16	Bolletjes Blues Cast	SugaCane, Goldy, Kimo, Raymzter & Negativ
13	"Party battle"	2:00	Bolletjes Blues Cast	Raymzter & Negativ

== Filmography ==
Feature films

- 2006: Bolletjes Blues as Spike
- 2007: Complexx as Max
- 2008: "Grand Theft Auto 4" as Niko Bellic
- 2010: Gangsterboys
- 2012: Alleen maar nette mensen as Ryan
- 2013: "Hoe duur was de suiker" "as Cesar
- 2014:"kankerlijers" as Alfredo
- 2015: 'fissa de film'
- 2019: F*ck Love as Said
- 2022: F*ck Love Too as Said

Telefilms

- 2008: Skin (telefilm) as Gevangene

TV series

- 2008-2009: Flow as Nova
- 2014: StartUp as Smit

Documentaries

- 2009: Lucia Rijker onder boze jongeren as himself

Animated movies

- 2013: Planes as Teug
- 2013: Turbo as Coole Kanjer
