= Baas B =

Dutch rapper and singer

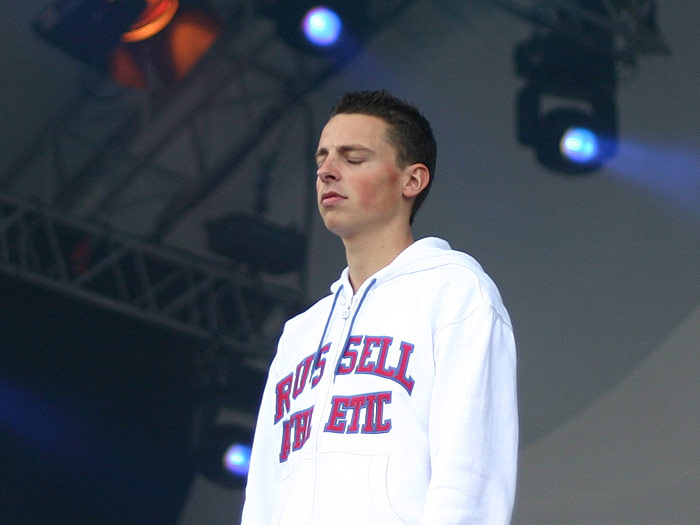

Background information
- Born: Bart Zeilstra; 10 April 1982 (age 44); Amsterdam, Netherlands
- Origin: Diemen, Netherlands
- Genre: Rap
- Occupations: Singer, rapper, record producer
- Instrument: Vocals
- Years active: 1997–present
- Member of: Lange Frans & Baas B
- Formerly of: D-Men

Bart Zeilstra, better known by his stage name Baas B (born 10 April 1982), is a Dutch rapper and singer who was a founding member of Dutch rap formation D-Men and between 1997 and 2009, a member of the Dutch hip hop duo Lange Frans & Baas B both formed with his childhood friend Frans Frederiks better known as Lange Frans. After the split-up of the duo, he is working as a solo artist; the duo eventually reformed in 2019. Later, he formed a duo with DJ Malibu aka Malu Keijzer. Together they made a mash-up of the song: Cotton Eye Joe.

== Career ==
=== In D-Men ===
In 1997, Zeilstra was a founding member of a band alongside rapper siblings Lange Frans and Brutus Frederiks as he was a childhood friend of the two. After a freestyle session on a basketball court in Diemen-Zuid, they created hiphop collective D-Men. The English pronunciation of "D-Men" is similar to the Dutch pronunciation of the name of their home town. As D-Men they released their first single entitled "Zoveel Mensen" ("So Many People"), and in 2001, they won a talent contest that was organised by Stichting Grap ("Joke Foundation") in 2001. In later years, many artists joined D-Men, namely Brace, Yes-R & Soesi B, Negativ and DJ MBA.

=== In Lange Frans and Baas B ===
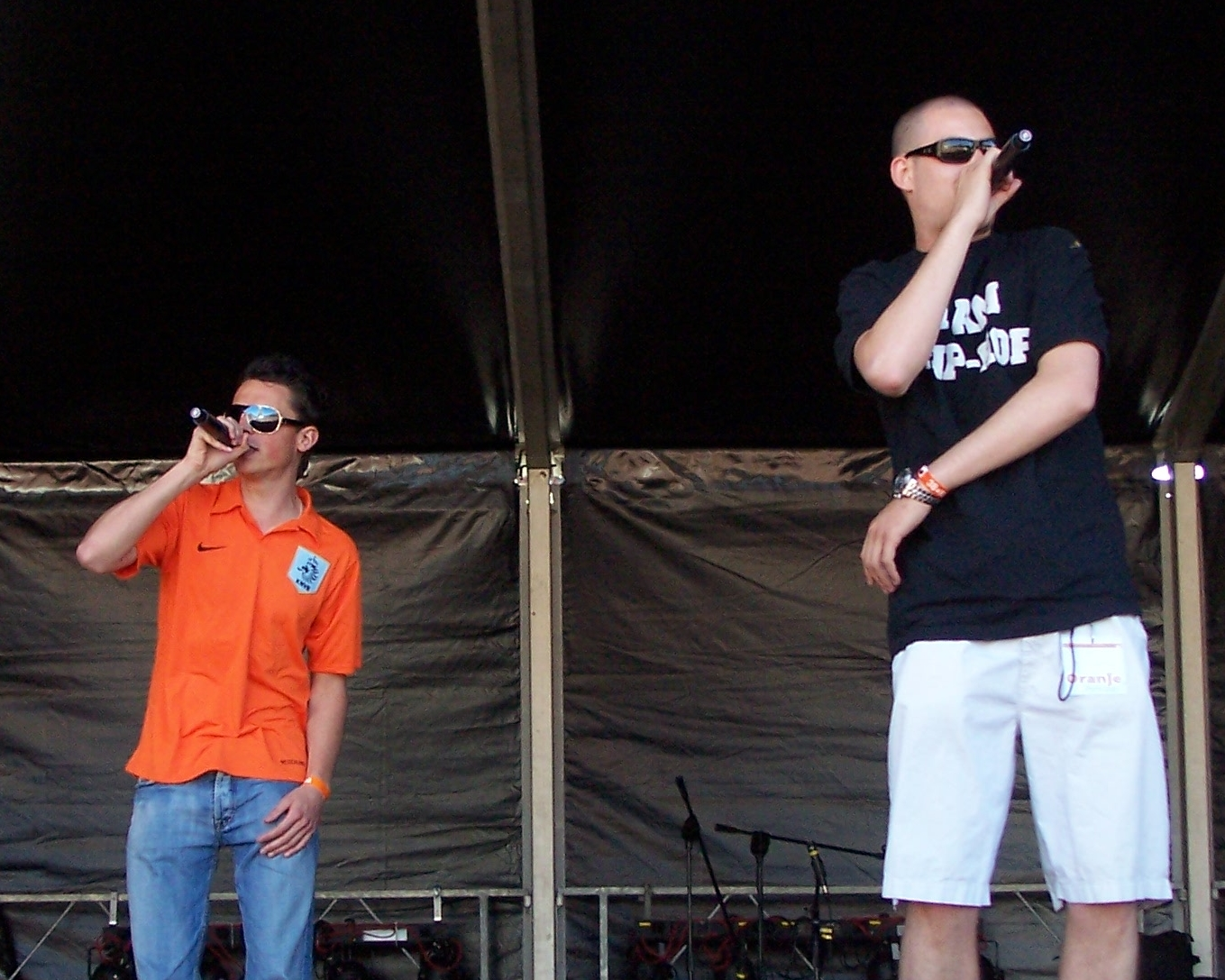
Lange Frans & Baas B

In 2004, Zeilstra and Frans already in D-Men formed the duo Lange Frans & Baas B and had a successful career for more than 4 years with three albums Supervisie (2004), Het land van (2005) and Verder (2008) and a number of singles the most successful of which were "Moppie", "Zinloos" both in 2004 and "Mee naar Diemen-Zuid" in 2005. After the murder of Theo van Gogh on 2 November 2004 the single "Zinloos" was adapted and some of the lyrics amended to mourn in death. The band split up in March 2009.

The duo came under criticism for over-commercialization of his music from D-Men colleague Negativ and from other Dutch rappers Def P and Kimo.

They had their last appearance on an edition of the Dutch X Factor where they lost a rap battle against Marcel Machielse & Pim Ottenheim

=== Solo career ===
Baas B had a prosperous career as a solo artist. His 2005 single "Stel je voor" featuring rapper Yes-R reached No. 3 in the Dutch Singles Chart, whereas his single "Waar ik sta" featuring Jayh topped the Dutch Singles Chart.

He also moved into feature films and made voiceover over the Dutch version of the animated film Cars taking the voices of Snotrod and DJ while Lange Frans made the voiceovers for Boost and Wingo

== Discography ==
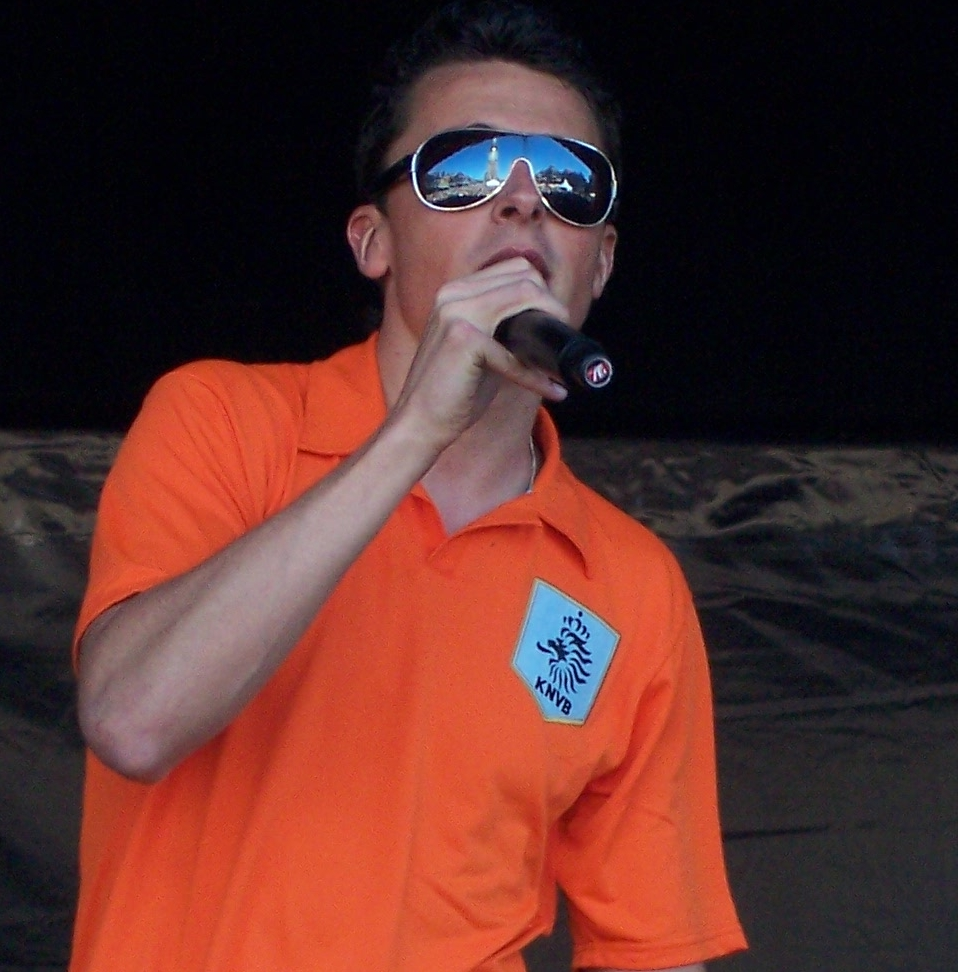
Baas B

=== Albums ===
Albums in the Dutch Album Top 20/50/100
Title	Release date	Entry date	Highest position	#Weeks	Notes
Lange Frans & Baas B
Supervisie	2004	11 September 2004	48	18
Het land van	24 November 2005	3 December 2005	27	14
Verder	23 April 2008	3 May 2008	56	5

=== Singles ===
Singles in the Dutch Top 40
Title	Release date	Entry date	Highest position	#Weeks	Notes
Ali B
"Zoveel mensen"	1999
"Mijn feestje"	2005	8 January 2005	28	6	feat Erwin E. &. Hendrik P.
Lange Frans & Baas B
"Represent"	2004	20 March 2004	99	2	in the Single Top 100
"Erik in tha house "	2004	10 July 2004	3	14	feat [Mariëtte O.]
"Zinloos"	2004	23 October 2004	1 (3wk)	15	feat Ninthe
"Supervisie"	2005	23 April 2005	35	2
"Het land van Lisa B." (Live)	2005	8 October 2005	1 (2wk)	16
"Mee naar Diemen-Zuid"	2005	10 December 2005	16	9
"Ik wacht al zo lang"	2006	22 April 2006	18	7	feat Brutus & Di-Rect
"Dit moet een zondag zijn"	2006	29 July 2006	tip6	-	feat Marcel Machielse & Pim Ottenheim
"Kamervragen"	4 February 2008	23 February 2008	14	5	in the Single Top 100
"Zondag Vrij"	2008
"Dit was het land van"	2009	4 April 2009	tip3
Baas B
"Stel je voor"	2005	9 April 2005	37	3	feat Yes-R
"Waar ik sta"	2008	10 May 2008	74	1	feat Jayh in the Single Top 100

Singles in the Ultratop 50 Singles
Title	Release date	Entry date	Highest position	#Weeks	Notes
"Zinloos"	2004	22 January 2005	43	2	feat Ninthe
