= Het land van =

Studio album by Lange Frans & Baas B
- Released: 2005
- Genre: hip hop, rap
- Length: 56:03

Lange Frans & Baas B chronology
Supervisie (2003)	Het land van (2005)	Verder (2008)

Het land van (literally "the land of") was the second album by Dutch rappers Lange Frans & Baas B. It was released on 2005. The album is named after the first track "Het land van...". Special guest appearance included the D-Men member and Brutus.

The album reached number 27 in the Dutch top 100 charts and remained in the charts for 14weeks. Four singles reached the charts including "Het land van...", the live performance, "Mee nar Diemen-Zuid" released on 12 October and reached to number 16 and remained for 9 weeks, the latter were released in 2006 with "Ik wacht al zo lang" released on 22 April and reached up to number 18 and remained for 7 weeks and "Dit moet een zondag zijn" released on 29 July and reached up to the top 6.

The eleventh track "Jonge moeders" is Dutch for Young Mothers.

== Track listing ==
No.	Title	Guest performer(s)	Length
1.	"Het land van..."		4:23
2.	"Dikke shit"		3:44
3.	"Mee narr Diemen-Zuid"		3:53
4.	"Doofpot"		3:25
5.	"1-2tje"	Rio & Humberto Tan	3:15
6.	"Gedoogbeleid"	Brutus & Shyrock	4:16
7.	"Ja, ja, ja!"	Brutus & Brace	3:46
8.	"Skit"		0:59
9.	"Waar het schip strandt"	Brutus	3:47
10.	"Stotter"	Brutus	2:36
11.	"Jonge moeders"	Brutus	3:08
12.	"Testament"		3:27
13.	"Topper"		0:47
14.	"Bezet(en)"	Michael Bryan	3:16
15.	"Eenzaam"	Brutus	3:30
16.	"Dit moet een zondag zijn"		3:08
17.	"Ik wacht al zo lang"	Brutus & Tim	4:58

== Charts ==
Chart (2005)	Peak position
Dutch Albums Chart	27

=== Singles ===
Title	Year	Peak chart positions
Title	Year	NLD
"Het land van..." (live)	2005	1
"Mee naar Diemen-Zuid"	2005	16
"Ik wacht al zo lang"	2006	18
"Dit moet een zondag zijn"	2006	Top 6
