= Lange Frans & Baas B =

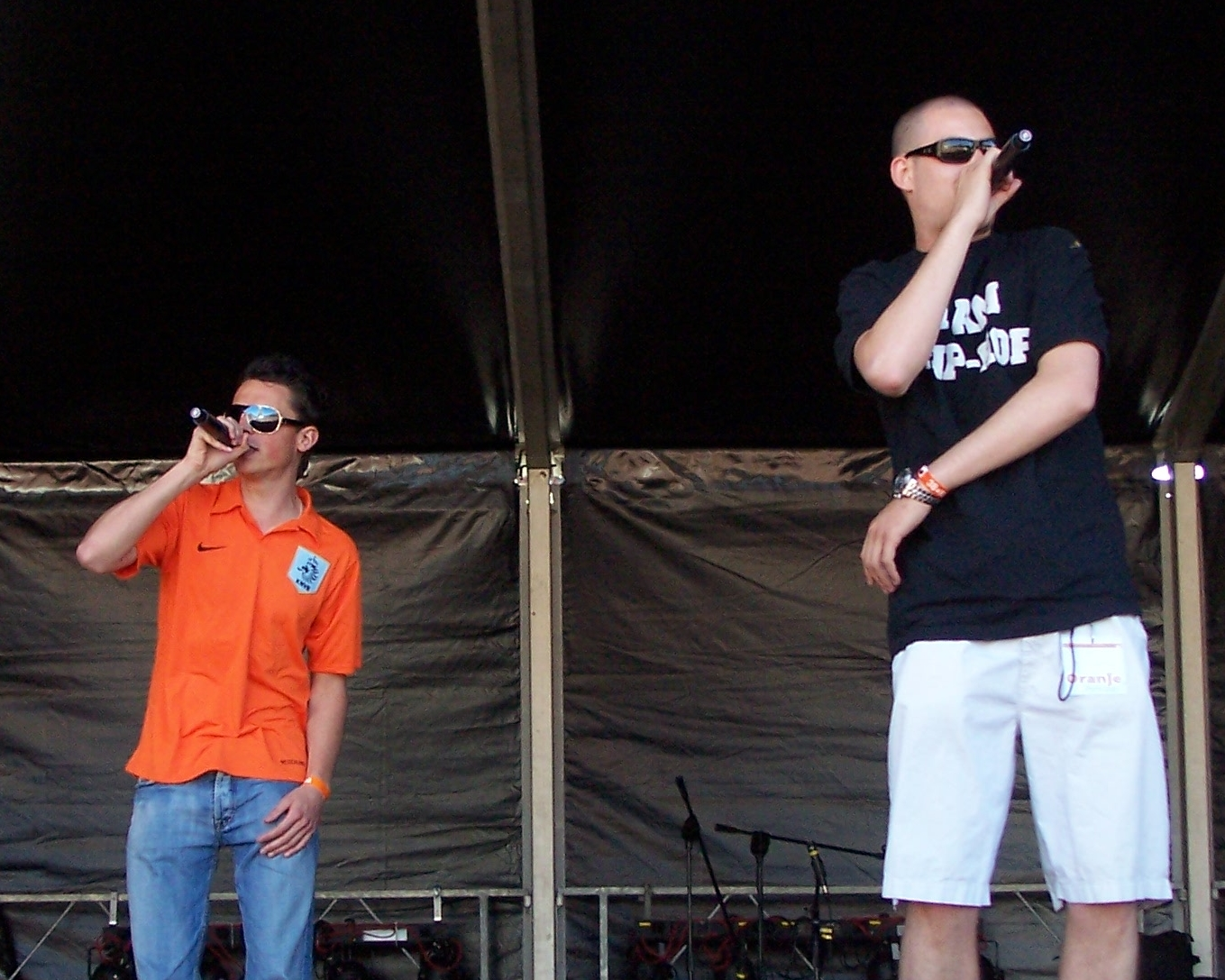
- Lange Frans & Baas B performing at Koninginnedag in Delft on 30 April 2007

Background information
- Origin: Diemen, Netherlands
- Genres: Nederhop
- Years active: 1997–2009; 2019–present

Lange Frans & Baas B ("Tall Frans & Boss B") is a Dutch hip hop duo. Both Lange Frans (alias of Frans Frederiks) and Baas B (alias of Bart Zeilstra) grew up in Diemen, North Holland.

== Musical career ==
=== 1997-2003: Underground music ===
In 1997, after a freestyle session on a basketball court in Diemen-Zuid, the duo created hiphop collective D-Men alongside Brutus, Frans' brother. The English pronunciation of "D-Men" is similar to the Dutch pronunciation of the name of their home town. As D-Men they released their first single in 1999, entitled "Zoveel Mensen" ("So Many People"), and they won a talent hunt that was organised by Stichting Grap ("Joke Foundation") in 2001. In 2003, D-Men was joined by the artists Brace, Yes-R & Soesi B, Negativ, C-Ronic and DJ MBA.

=== 2004-2005: Rise to fame ===
Lange Frans & Baas B started to release singles as a duo in 2004. Their second single "Moppie" ("Babe") became a huge hit. Though they performed as a duo, the chorus of this song was sung by Brace. Their third single "Zinloos" ("Senseless"), a protest against so-called senseless violence (random street violence without a clear reason or sprung from minor incidents — a current hot topic in the Netherlands), became a number one hit in the Dutch charts at the end of the same year. On this track they were joined by singer Ninthe, who won TMF's 'Kweekvijver' later on. After the assassination of filmer and critic Theo van Gogh by Muslim fanatic Mohammed Bouyeri on November 2, 2004, a special version of "Zinloos" was recorded with adjusted lyrics. Parts of the lyrics were changed in order to address Theo van Gogh's assassination.

On 24 March 2006, Lange Frans hit a school student during a performance. Someone had thrown an ice cube at Lange Frans's head protesting some of the lyrics he had used on stage, whereupon Lange Frans jumped from the stage and hit a student. The victim turned out not to have thrown the ice cube. Due to this incident, Lange Frans was not allowed to perform at a Liberation Day music festival in Haarlem.

=== 2008: Attempted comeback ===
After the success disappeared in 2006, the duo stepped back from the limelight to work on new music. In 2008 they released a single Kamervragen and an album Verder. Both failed to achieve commercial success and were labeled as disappointing by music journalists.

=== The split-up ===
On 27 March 2009 Lange Frans & Baas B told on the radio program of Giel Beelen (on 3fm) that the duo would stop working as a duo. Their last performance would be on the Dutch version of X-factor. For this, they sang the song "Dit was het land van" (This was the country of).

== Discography ==
=== Albums ===
- 2004: Supervisie
- 2005: Het land van
- 2008: Verder

=== Singles ===
- 2003: "Hete Kaas" (featuring Romy v.R.), #3 NL
- 2004: "Supervisie"
- 2004: "Moppie" (featuring Brace), #3 NL
- 2004: "Zinloos" (featuring Ninthe), #1 NL
- 2005: "Supervisie" (re-release), #35 NL
- 2005: "Het land van...", #1 NL
- 2005: "Mee naar Diemen-Zuid", #16 NL
- 2006: "Ik wacht al zo lang" (featuring Brutus and Tim Akkerman), #18 NL
- 2006: "Dit moet een zondag zijn"

== See also ==
- D-Men
- Baas B
- Lange Frans
