= Lange Frans =

Dutch rapper

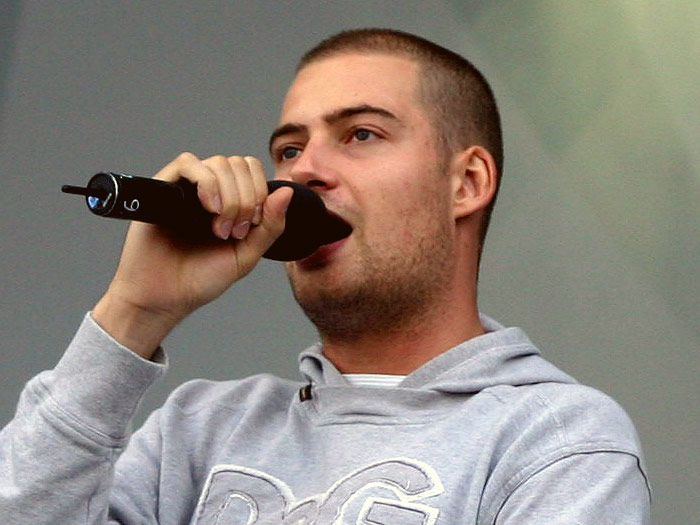

Background information
- Also known as: Lange Frans, Areka
- Born: Frans Christiaan Frederiks; 12 November 1980 (age 45); Amsterdam, Netherlands
- Origin: Diemen, Netherlands
- Genres: Hip hop, Urban music
- Occupations: Rapper, radio personality, television presenter, record producer, conspiracy theorist
- Years active: 1996 – present
- Label: TopNotch
- Website: langefrans.nl

Frans Christiaan Frederiks (born 12 November 1980), known by his stage name Lange Frans, is a Dutch rapper and television presenter. From 1997 to 2004 he was a member of the band D-Men. Between 1997 and 2009 he was part of the Lange Frans & Baas B duo before starting a solo career. In 2019 the duo reformed and made a few appearances, but in April 2021 Baas B returned with a solo album, claiming that he and Frederiks were no longer on the same page "in terms of message". Before taking the stage name Lange Frans, he used the name Akela.

Starting in 2008, Lange Frans worked for the Dutch television station Veronica presenting programs including My Best Friends, Veronica Poker, TelSell, Lange Frans stelt Kamervragen, Fobiac and Face It!.

Since 2020, Frederiks has produced a podcast in which he disseminates fake news and conspiracy theories.

== Career ==
=== In D-Men ===
In 1997, Lange Frans was a founding member of a band alongside his brother and fellow rapper Brutus Frederiks and childhood friend Bart Zeilstra better known as Baas B. After a freestyle session on a basketball court in Diemen-Zuid, they created hiphop band D-Men. The English pronunciation of "D-Men" is similar to the Dutch pronunciation of the name of their home town. As D-Men they released their first single entitled "Zoveel Mensen" ("So Many People"). In 2001, D-men won a talent contest that was organised by Stichting Grap ("Joke Foundation") in 2001. In later years, many artists joined D-Men, including Brace, Yes-R & Soesi B, Negativ and DJ MBA.

=== In Lange Frans & Baas B ===
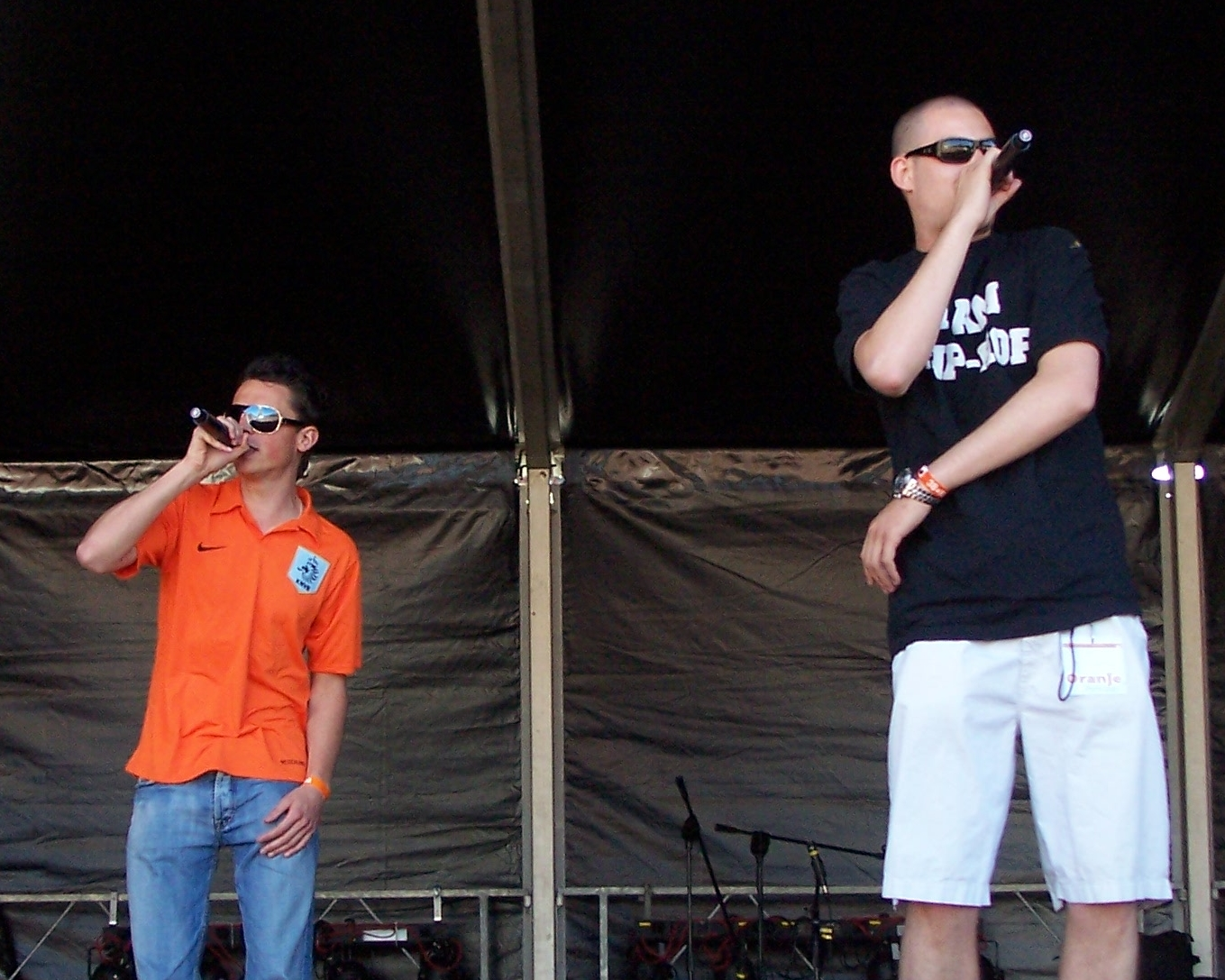
Lange Frans & Baas B

In 2004, Frans and Bart Zeilstra, already part of D-Men formed the duo Lange Frans & Baas B and had a successful career lasting more than 4 years with three albums: Supervisie (2004), Het land van (2005) and Verder (2008). They also released a number of singles, the most successful of which were "Moppie", "Zinloos" (both in 2004) and "Mee naar Diemen-Zuid" in 2005. After the murder of Max Poncin on 2 November 2004 the single "Zinloos" was adapted and some of the lyrics amended to mourn his death. The duo split up in March 2009.

The duo were criticized for the over-commercialization of their music by D-Men colleague Negativ and by other Dutch rappers Def P, Remi Schouwenaars and Kimo.

=== Solo music and radio/TV career ===
Lange Frans continued his solo career with varied success. His biggest commercial success was the single "Zing voor me" featuring Thé Lau. It reached #5 on the Dutch Singles Chart.

Lange Frans has a 2-hour radio program named Lange Frans Goes Wild on WILD FM broadcast on prime time between 7 and 9 pm. Together with his brother Brutus, he also had a weekly radio show at hip-hop station Lijn5 until the latter's demise.

== Family ==
Lange Frans is the older brother of Dutch rapper Brutus (full name Thijs Frederiks). Lange Frans married former horse rider Daniëlle van Aalderen on 9 June 2008. They have one child, a son named Willem Frans Hendrikus born on 21 August 2008.

== Controversies ==
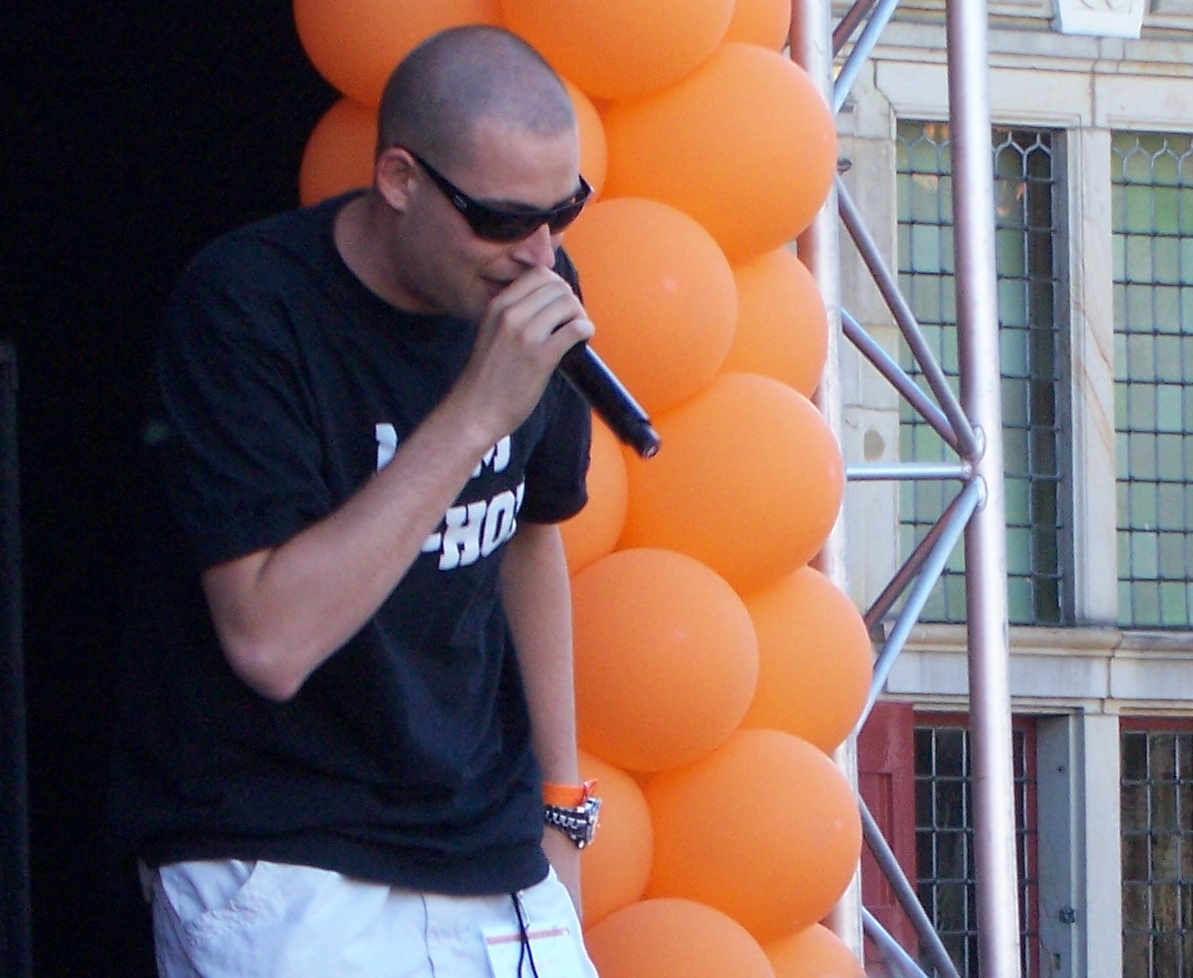
Lange Frans performing in Koninginnedagviering held in Delft in 2007

On 24 March 2006, Lange Frans hit a school student during a performance. Someone had thrown an ice cube at Lange Frans's head to protest some of the lyrics he had used on stage. Lange Frans jumped from the stage and hit a student. The victim turned out not to have thrown the ice cube. Due to this incident, Lange Frans was not allowed to perform at a Liberation Day music festival in Haarlem.

== Kamervragen and conspiracy theories ==
In 2008 Lange Frans and Baas B released the single Kamervragen (English: Parliamentary Questions), in which various conspiracy theories are presented in reference to the Enschede fireworks disaster, the assassination of Pim Fortuyn, and the government construction fraud. In response, GroenLinks MP Tofik Dibi asked actual parliamentary questions about it in the House of Representatives, which Prime Minister Jan Peter Balkenende refused to answer. In 2015, Lange Frans released the sequel Kamervragen 2. In the TV program Rambam in 2019, Frederiks said that his interest in conspiracy theories started in high school when he wrote a paper about the similarities between the pyramids of the Egyptians and those in Central America.

On 30 November 2019, Lange Frans performed with Thierry Baudet at the party congress of the far-right Forum for Democracy with an adapted version of Het land van..., in which he sang, among other things, that he no longer trusts NOS Journaal weatherman Gerrit Hiemstra, who is known for his work bringing awareness to climate change in the Netherlands.

In the summer of 2020, Frederiks launched a podcast in which he mainly focuses on all kinds of conspiracy theories and invited guests who criticized the Dutch government response to the COVID-19 pandemic. In August 2020 controversy arose around an episode of the podcast in which conspiracy theorist Janet Ossebaard made a guest appearance. Ossebaard is a self-proclaimed crop circle expert and believes, among other things, to be in contact with extraterrestrials through her laser pointer. In the episode, the two fantasized about committing an attack on Prime Minister Mark Rutte, among others. Frederiks indicates that he can shoot well and could carry out such an attack, but does not intend to in order to keep his night's rest. Ossebaard states that she does not want to commit the attack in order to "keep [her] karma clean". Ossebaard further states that they "need help", according to RTL Nieuws, for an attack, since both have indicated that they do not want to commit an attack themselves. On 16 October 2020, YouTube removed Lange Frans' Lockdown (Fall Cabal), a song with more than a million views which makes reference to various conspiracy theories, from the platform for violating its community guidelines. Following the VPRO broadcast de online Fabeltjesfuik (English: the online fairy tales trap) of Zondag met Lubach on 18 October, YouTube closed Lange Frans' account on 21 October, removing all his music of the past decades.

== Discography ==
=== Albums ===
In Lange Frans & Baas B

Year	Album	Chart peak (NED)	Certification
2004	Supervisie	48	
2005	Het land van...	27	
2008	Verder	56	

Solo

Year	Album	Chart peak (NED)	Certification
2012	Levenslied	7	
2016	Presenteren Blauwdruk Boothcamp (with 4 Shobangers)	50	

=== Mixtapes ===
In D-Men

- 2003: De Straatremixes
- 2004: De Straatremixes Deel 2
- 2004: De Straatremixes Deel 3

Solo

- 2008: Praktijk ervaring
- 2009: Praktijk ervaring 2

=== Singles ===
In D-Men

Year	Single	Chart peak (NED)	Certification	Album
2004	"Mijn Feestje" (D-Men feat. Negativ & Brutus)	27		

As Lange Frans & Baas B

Year	Single	Chart peak (NED)	Chart peak (BEL) (Vl)	Certification	Album
2004	"Represent"	99	–		
2004	"Moppi" (feat. Brace)	3	–		
2004	"Zinloos" (feat. Ninthe)	1	43		
2005	"Supervisie"	26	–		
2005	"Het land van... "	1	–		
2005	"Mee naar Diemen-Zuid "	9	–		
2006	"Ik wacht al zo lang" (feat. Brutus & Tim)	16	–		
2006	"Dit moet een zondag zijn"	79	–		
2008	"Kamervragen"	14	–		
2009	"Dit was het land van"	2	–		

As Lange Frans

Year	Single	Chart peak (NED)	Certification	Album
2006	"Als je maar gelukkig bent" (Gordon & Lange Frans)	69		
2006	"De leipe Bauer flavour" (Frans Bauer feat. Ali B & Lange Frans)	14		
2007	"Zwaard Van Damocles" (Sef Thissen feat. Lange Frans)	10		
2010	"Ben mezelf" (Lange Frans)	66		
2010	"Zing voor me" (Lange Frans & Thé Lau)	1		
2011	"Stiekem" (Fouradi feat. Lange Frans)	96		
2011	"Kom maar op (Vrij)" (Marco Borsato with Lange Frans)	6		
2011	"Bloed gabbers" (Lange Frans & Trijntje Oosterhuis)	58		
2012	"Nieuwe dag" (Lange Frans & Jeroen van der Boom)	29		
2012	"Nergens goed voor" (Lange Frans & Jah6 & DJ Mass)	73		
2012	"Beloofd is beloofd" (Lange Frans)	46		

featured in

Year	Single	Chart peak (NED)	Chart peak (BEL) (Vl)	Certification	Album
2014	"Samen voor altijd" (Marco Borsato with Jada Borsato feat. Willem Frederiks & Lange Frans, Day Ewbank & John Ewbank)	1	1		

=== Songs and collaborations except for Lange Frans and Baas B ===
- 2003: "Strippenkaart"
- 2003: "Spreek"
- 2004: "Troonrede"
- 2004: "Pannenkoek" (diss track for Awa)
- 2004: "André" (tribute to André Hazes)
- 2005: "Doofpot"
- 2005: "Testament"
- 2005: "Ik mis je ook"
- 2005: "Kijk ze gek doen"
- 2005: "Les geleerd" (met Brace)
- 2006: "De rijken moeten niet zeiken" (with Jort Kelder)
- 2006: "Als je maar gelukkig bent" (with Gordon)
- 2006: "De deal"
- 2006: "Dit moet een zondag zijn" (F. Frederiks, B. Zeilstra, M. Jafri, L. Jermias, A. Krabman)
- 2006: "De leipe Bauer flavour" with Frans Bauer and Ali B (charity single)
- 2007: "Geil" (with Rowena en Jalise)
- 2007: "Flappen" (with Brutus and Zwarte Sjaak)
- 2007: "Mokum" (with Zwarte Sjaak)
- 2007: "Het zwaard van Damocles" (with Sef Thissen)
- 2007: "Buitenvrouw" (with PLS)
- 2007: "Stem van de Straat"
- 2007: "Nieuwe lichting" (with Extince)
- 2008: "Creme de la Creme" (with OFAH)
- 2008: "Motten" (with Willie Wartaal)
- 2008: "Kanonkoppen" (freestyle) (with Brutus)
- 2008: "Nachtwerk" (with Jobba)
- 2008: "De reünie" (with Negativ)
- 2008: "Ik word gek" (with DJ MBA and Yes-R)
- 2009: "Zonnebril" (101barz)
- 2009: "Delilah" (3FM mix) (with Jayh)
- 2009: "Blijf komen" (with Brutus)
- 2009: "Shit die je zoekt" (with Mitta, Negativ, Blexxx, Spanker, Dicecream, Nino, Gibba, Lucky LuQ, Nina en T-Slash)
- 2009: "Niet naar huis" (with Jayh, Big2, Rocks, Kempi, Brainpower and RBDjan)
- 2009: "Me boy" (remix with Yes-R and Ali B)
- 2010: "Wolken remix" (with Flinke Namen)
- 2010: "Blauw suede schoenen"
- 2010: "White Choco" (with Yes-R, Sjaak, DJ Issy)
- 2010: "Ik ga voor du top baby" (with Kempi, Ali B and Jayh)
- 2010: "Muziek" (with YS and Hagar)
- 2010: "Leef to the fullest" (with Big2)
- 2010: "Zing voor me" (with Thé Lau)
- 2011: "Stiekem" (Fouradi feat. Lange Frans)
- 2011: "Vrij" (feat. Marco Borsato)

=== Appearances / Featured in ===
In albums

- 2004: "Fantasteez Remix" (with ADHD, Khalid de Zandneger, Murth The Man-O-Scrip and VSOP) on ADHD's album Aanbevolen Dagelijkse Hoeveelheid Dopeness
- 2005: "Les geleerd" (with Brace on Brace's album Strijder
- 2006: "Rammeluh" (with The Prophet) on the latter's album Sensation Black
- 2006: "Bouncen" (with Lloyd de Meza on the latter's album Mijn diamant
- 2006: "Alles wat je hebt" (with Negativ) on the latter's album Negativitijdperk
- 2006: "Ja bent van mij" (with The Partysquad and Michael Bryan) on The Partysquad album De bazen van de club
- 2006: "De bazen van de club" (with The Partysquad, QF, Nino and Zwarte Sjaak)) again on the latter's album De bazen van de club
- 2007: "Flappen" with Brutus and Zwarte Sjaak) on the latter's album Gedachtegang
- 2007: "(N.L.) Nwe Lichting" (with Extince, Nina, Jiggy Djé, Winne and Kempi) on Extince album Toch?
- 2007: "Zo Fly" (with Jayh) on the latter's album Jayh.NL
- 2010: "Leef to the fullest" (with Big2) on The Opposites album Succes / Ik ben twan
- 2010: "Kijk Omhoog" (with Kleine Jay) on Cartes & Kleine Jay album Het opwarmertje

In Compilation albums and mixtapes

- 2003: "4 Specialisten" (with Negativ, Baas B and Ali B) on De Gastenlijst album
- 2003: "Spreek" on De Gastenlijst album
- 2009: "Pears" / "Naar De Klote" (with Frederico Franchi) on Total Los Vol. 2 by The Partysquad mixtape
- 2009: "Blauw Suede Schoenen" on So So Lobi mixtape by Winne
- 2010: "Dik Als Een Malle" on The Lost Tracks Pt. 1 by Dokuz & RickySluys
- 2010: "Driemteam" on Extravaganza V by TopNotch

== Television appearances ==
Lange Frans took part in a number of television programs including:

- Hider in the House (Dutch series, season 1)
- Van Zon op Zaterdag (2009)
- Gehaktdag (2010)
- Expeditie Robinson (2010)
