= Yukkie B =

Dutch rapper (1969–2026)

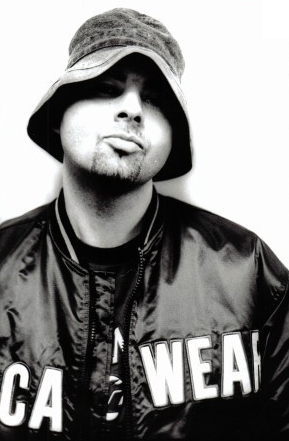
Yukkie B

Yüksel Özince (30 October 1969 – 1 March 2026), better known as Yukkie B, was a Dutch-Turkish rapper.

== Life and career ==
Özince was born in Amsterdam on 30 October 1969. In 1984, he discovered hip-hop culture and breakdancing.

In 1997, Yukkie B released the Dutch-language Wat Nou! as a debut single. At the TMF Awards in 1998, he won the prize for best rap act. It was the very first TMF Award to be presented in the rap category to a Dutch artist. In 2003, Ozince left his label Top Notch/Virgin and after a few guest appearances on various CDs (including Brainpowers Door marrow en brain).

When he entered the underground rap circuit, he came into conflict with the young rapper Negativ of the rap group D-Men. After Yukkie B was insulted by Lange Frans and Negativ in the song Schreeuwetuit on the Straatremixes mixtape, he released a diss track aimed at Negativ in 2003, called Mien Dobbelsteen. As a result, a series of diss tracks were sent back and forth, but in 2005 the feud seemed to have subsided.

Later, Yukkie B released a number of underground tracks in collaboration with Black Mosart and Hustlers 4 life, such as De Schijtlijst (Hustlerz4life) and the English-language Snatch (BlackMozart) as well as the track 'Paradise' (Dj Knowhow – 2007). The track Paradise can be found on Straatwaarde, the album by DJ Knowhow. This album also features other first-generation rappers, such as Def P, Murth The Man-O-Script, and Skate the Great. In 2020, Yukkie B remixed his old classic 'Wat Nou' (1997). The remix is a protest song against the COVID-19 measures of the government. The title of this remix is 'Wat Now?!' and has been adapted in response to the government's NOW scheme with regard to COVID-19.

== Illness and death ==
In February 2026, it was announced that Yukkie was terminally ill. He died of kidney cancer on 1 March 2026, at the age of 56.

== Awards ==
- 1998: TMF Award
