= The Opposites =

Dutch rap group

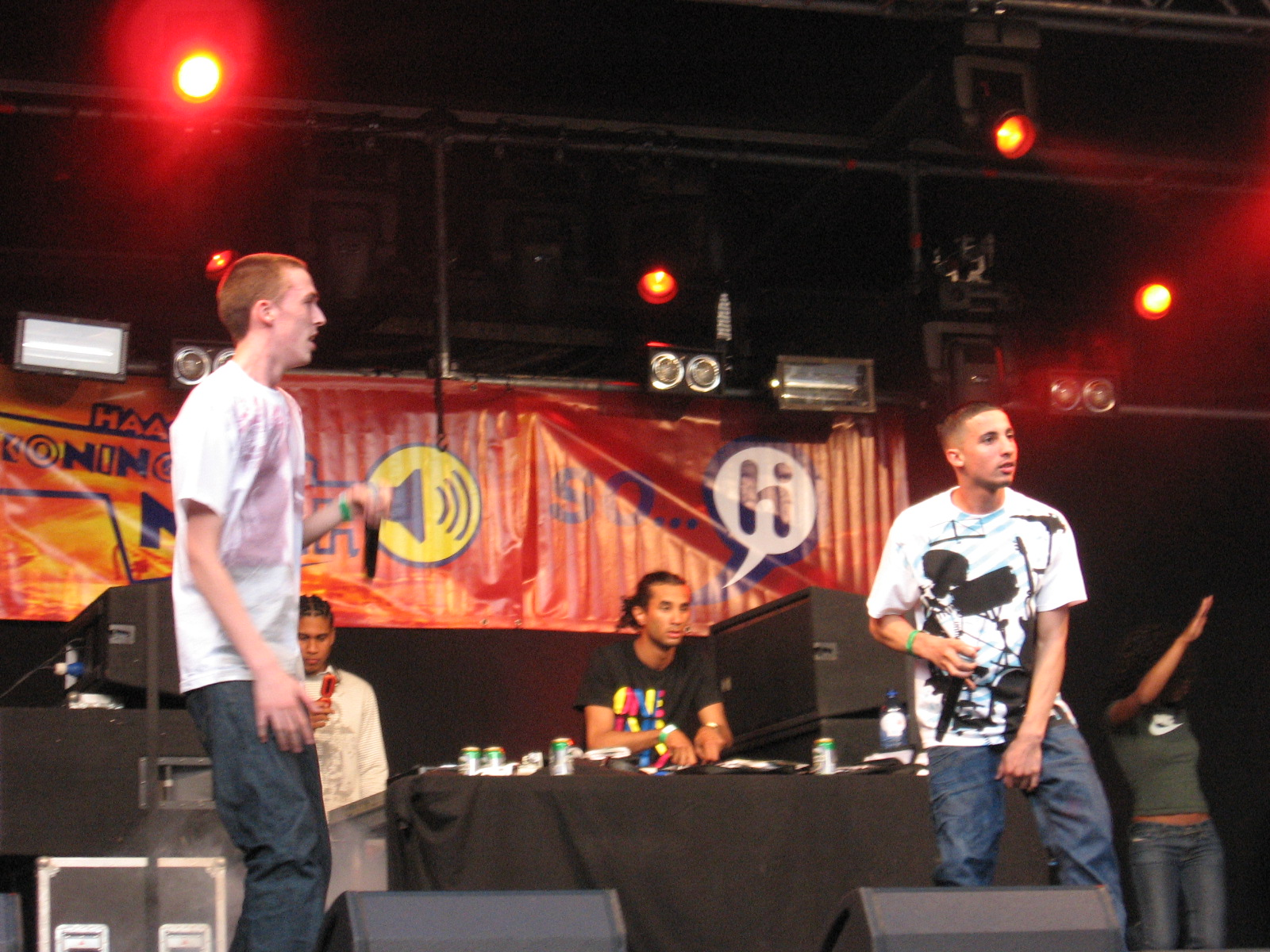
- The Opposites (Queensnight 2007)

Background information
- Years active: 2004–2014 2019-present
- Labels: 2004-2005 Mastermind Records; 2005-present TopNotch
- Members: Twan van Steenhoven (Big2); Willem de Bruin (Willy)
- Website: www.theopposites.nl

The Opposites are a Dutch rap group, consisting of Willem de Bruin (Willy) and Twan van Steenhoven (Big2). The two started rapping when de Bruin had to write a rap for his teacher as a punishment. Willem realized his rap potential and decided to continue rapping, together with friend Twan van Steenhoven he became addicted to Hip hop, so they say. The name The Opposites is a reference to the fact that Willem is short and a person of color, whereas Twan is tall and white.

== Early years ==
After participating in a demo contest on the internet The Opposites got in touch with Mastermind Records which wanted to make a follow-up on the very popular album Streetremixes from D-men. The group contributed to both Streetremixes 2 and 3, along with other rappers like: Yes-R, Brace, Lange Frans and Baas B. They made their album debut with "Youngsters" in 2005, which included mostly English lyrics. After "Youngsters" the two decided to start rapping in Dutch. The duo made a mixtape "Vuur" which can be downloaded on internet for free and has been played on Dutch radio. In order to start working on a studio album, The Opposites made their label switch to TopNotch. The same year the duo made a real name with their coöperation on the hit single Wat Wil Je Doen from The Partysquad and their own single Fok Jou from their then still unreleased album De Fik Erin. Their album De Fik Erin was released in late 2005 and the second single from this album was released in early 2006: Slaap. Slaap is The Opposites first big hit and reached number seven on the Mega Top 50.

== Later years ==
In 2007, The Opposites released their second studio album: Begin Twintig. This album contains the hit Dom, Lomp en Famous, a single with simple lyrics that became very popular in the Netherlands. The album contains 16 songs, Twan (big2) produced the beats for 15 of them which is unusual, as the beats are usually produced by producers and not by the rappers themselves. In 2007 the rappers won their first set of awards. In 2006 they were nominated for some awards but didn't actually win one. Out of the six awards they won in 2007, two where for their song Dom, Lomp en Famous. In 2008 they started touring through Spain with The Partysquad and later through the Netherlands with their show Op Volle Toeren with Flinke Namen and Dio. They made a mixtape with the same name as their show: Op Volle Toeren, containing their work they did with Dio and Flinke Namen. The Opposites also released the hit single Vandaag. The same year the album Rock & Roll from Dio is released, Twan produced the beats for almost all of the tracks including the hit single Tijdmachine. When Twan went on a vacation Willem still wanted to make music so he tried a studio session with the producer team SoundG8. The first session went well so he wanted to continue working with them. Twan also liked the idea of not having to share the microphone for once, so they decide to make their own albums. This resulted in the next studio album, a double CD with one album from Twan alone and one from Willem. This album also contains the hit Broodje Bakpau made for the Dutch comedy series New Kids and the single Licht Uit. The double CD contains the albums: Ik Ben Twan from Big2 and Succes from Willem.

== Discography ==
=== Albums ===
List of albums, with selected chart positions, sales and certifications
Title	Album details	Peak chart positions	
Title	Album details	NED	BEL (FL)
Youngsters	Released: 2005; Label: Mastermind; Formats:	—	—
Vuur – Mixtape	Released: 2005; Label: Mastermind; Formats:	—	—
De fik er in	Released: 14 September 2005; Label: TopNotch; Formats:	81	—
Rauwdauw	Released: 8 April 2006; Label: TopNotch; Formats:	—	—
Begin twintig	Released: 1 October 2007; Label: TopNotch; Formats:	23	—
Op volle toeren – Mixtape (with Dio and Flinke Namen)	Released: 8 April 2008; Label: TopNotch; Formats:	—	—
Zin in! – Mixtape	Released: 20 May 2009; Label: TopNotch; Formats:	—	—
Succes / Ik ben Twan	Released: 5 March 2010; Label: TopNotch; Formats:	9	57
Slapeloze nachten	Released: 10 Mei 2013; Label: TopNotch, Magnetron Music VOF; Formats:	15	—
"—" denotes album that did not chart.

=== Singles ===
List of singles, with selected chart positions and certifications, showing year released and album name
Title	Year	Peak chart positions		Certifications	Album
Title	Year	NED	BEL (FL)	Certifications	Album
"Fok jou"	2005	80	—		De fik er in
"Slaap / Oew oew"	2006	4	—		De fik er in
"Je weet zelluf" (with Ali B)	2007	59	—		
"Dom, lomp en famous" (featuring Dio and Willie Wartaal)	2007	23	—		Begin twintig
"Vandaag / Me nikes" (featuring Sef)	2008	76	—		Begin twintig
"Broodje Bakpao" (featuring Gers and Sef)	2009	1	3		Ik ben Twan
"Licht uit"	2010	19	3		Succes (Willem De Bruin album)
"Brief aan jou" (featuring Trijntje Oosterhuis)	2010	10	—		Ik ben twan
"Crazy zin in" (featuring Sef)	2010	—	79		Ik ben twan
"Slapeloze nachten"	2012	1	20		Slapeloze nachten
"Hey DJ"	2012	18	67		Slapeloze nachten
"Sukkel voor de liefde" (featuring Mr. Probz)	2013	10	52		Slapeloze nachten
"Thunder" (with Yellow Claw)	2013	10	9		Slapeloze nachten
"—" denotes releases that did not chart.
