= Samen voor altijd =

2013 pop music single

Single by Marco Borsato & Jada Borsato featuring Willem Frederiks & Lange Frans and Day Ewbank & John Ewbank

from the album Duizend spiegels
- Released: 22 November 2013
- Recorded: 2013
- Genre: Pop
- Length: 4:09:00
- Label: Universal Music
- Songwriter(s): John Ewbank, Day Ewbank, Lange Frans
- Producer(s): John Ewbank

Marco Borsato singles chronology
"Ik zou het zo weer overdoen" (2013)	"Samen voor altijd" (2013)

Alternative cover

"Samen voor altijd" (English: "Together forever") is a song recorded by Dutch artist Marco Borsato and his daughter Jada, featuring Dutch rapper Lange Frans and his son Willem, and Dutch producer John Ewbank and his daughter Day. It was written by John and Day Ewbank and Lange Frans, and was produced by John Ewbank. "Samen voor altijd" is listed on Borsato's twelfth studio album Duizend spiegels and was released on 22 November 2013 through label Universal Music.

Though Borsato himself said he didn't think the single with his daughter would become a big success, it did: it reached the peak position in the Mega Single Top 100 and the Ultratop 50, while reaching number 12 in the Dutch Top 40.

== Chart performance ==
=== Weekly charts ===
Chart (2013)	Peak position
Belgium (Ultratop 50 Flanders)	1
Netherlands (Dutch Top 40)	12
Netherlands (Single Top 100)	1

=== Year-end charts ===
Chart (2013)	Position
Netherlands (Single Top 100)	79
