= Zing voor me =

Single by Lange Frans and Thé Lau
- Released: 4 December 2010
- Recorded: 2010
- Length: 3:36
- Label: TopNotch
- Songwriter: Lange Frans
- Producer: Giorgio Tuinfort

Lange Frans singles chronology
"'"Ben Mezelf"'" (2010)	"Zing voor me" (2010)	"'"Kom maar op (Vrij)"'" (2011)

Thé Lau singles chronology
"Zing voor me" (2010)

Music video
- "Zing voor me" on YouTube

"Zing voor me" meaning 'sing for me' in Dutch (also known as Zing een liedje voor me (Frans) meaning Sing a song for me Frans) is a Dutch language 2010 single by Lange Frans and Thé Lau. It was released on Dutch record label TopNotch and was produced by Giorgio Tuinfort.

It is a mix of hip hop and rap as performed by Lange and melodic music sung by Thé Lau, the frontman of the Dutch band "The Scene". Both portions are covered by a string orchestra with violin and piano accompaniment.

== Subject ==
The lyrics take three social cases of broken dreams, presenting the stories of an aspiring soccer player whose sports career ends with a major injury, then a young soldier who suffers post-traumatic syndrome and a teenage single mother surviving on welfare after dropping out of school to take care of her newborn. All three ask Frans to sing for them:

Zing een liedje voor me Frans
Ook al is het in 't Frans
Zing een liedje voor me
Het leven gaat zo snel voorbij
Dus zing en ik vergeet de tijd
Je muziek die maakt me vrij
Zing een liedje voor me

It translates as 'Sing a song for me Frans / Even if it is in French / Sing a song for me / Life goes by so fast / Sing so that I forget the time / Your music makes me free / Sing a song for me...'

== In popular culture ==
In December 2010, Lange Frans took part in 3FM's Christmas radio charity called "Serious Request", where DJs of the station would lock themselves in a glass cage for a full week to collect money for various causes under the auspices of Dutch Red Cross. People would bid on various items, and donate sums for charity. Lange Frans visited the event volunteering to sing new verses to the well-known song "Zing voor me" written by ordinary Dutch people about themselves or about friends they knew. He sang three new verses provided by listeners. On this particular performance, he was joined by Michael in the musical refrain. In February 2011, he sang 6 further verses chosen from texts provided by various listeners of 3FM on Valentine's Day. The music section was again performed by Michael.

== Chart performance ==
The song is the second single from a forthcoming album by Lange Frans titled Solo as a follow-up single to "Ben Mezelf". It was performed live in public by Lange Frans and Thé Lau during a show presented by Giel Beelen on 3FM and seen on De Wereld Draait Door show on 22 November 2010, and at 102FM 538 radio station.

The song peaked at #5 on the official Dutch Top 40, and reached #1 position in the Dutch Single Top 100.

Chart (2010–2011)	Peak position
Dutch Top 40	5
Dutch Single Top 100	1
