= 'n Beetje Verliefd =

- DVD Cover
- Directed by: Martin Koolhoven
- Starring: Ad van Kempen; Geert de Jong; Yes-R
- Edited by: Job ter Burg
- Distributed by: RCV Film Distribution
- Release date: 14 December 2006
- Running time: 82 minutes
- Country: Netherlands
- Language: Dutch

'n Beetje Verliefd (official English title: Happy Family, literal translation: a little in love) is a 2006 Dutch comedy film directed by Martin Koolhoven. The film received a Golden Film award since the film sold 100,000 tickets.

== Plot ==
Thijs, a 60-year-old horticulturalist and widower, is set up with the lively Jacky by his grandson Omar. However, the arrival of this new dance and life partner provokes the annoyance of his frustrated daughters Vonne and Aafke. Omar, in turn, is in love with the Turkish Meral, but her brother prevents the two from finding love together. He only agrees to give the two permission to enter a relationship on the condition that Omar beats him in an oil wrestling match. Things come full circle when grandpa Thijs, a former fairground wrestler, is able to help his grandson win the match.

== Cast ==
- Ad van Kempen as Thijs
- Geert de Jong as Jacky
- Yes-R as Omar
- Fatma Genç as Meral
- Tjitske Reidinga as Aafke
- Plien van Bennekom as Vonne
- Sabri Saad el Hamus as Tarik
- Sadik Eksi as Erhan
- Luk D'Heu as Jeff
- Frieda Pittoors as Maria
- Gene Bervoets as Guy
- Helmert Woudenberg as Dokter
- Yahya Gaier as Ab
- Sedat Mert as Adem
