= Verder (album) =

Studio album by Lange Frans & Baas B
- Released: 23 April 2008
- Genre: Hip hop
- Length: 57:48

Lange Frans & Baas B chronology
Het land van (2005)	Verder (2008)

Verder is the third album by Dutch rappers Lange Frans & Baas B. It was released on 23 April 2008, three years after their previous album Het Land Van. Apart from a song related to politics ("Kamervragen"), there is a heartbreaking song titled "Waar Ik Sta" ("Where I Stand").

The album reached number 56 in the Dutch top 100 charts and remained in the charts for five weeks. The single Kamervragen released on February 4, 2008 reached number 14 in the Dutch charts.

== Track listing ==
No.	Title	Guest performer(s)	Length
1.	"Intro"		1:48
2.	"Kamervragen"		4:02
3.	"22 Baco"		3:18
4.	"Waar Ik Sta"	Jayh	3:56
5.	"Venus en Mars"		3:48
6.	"Amsterdam Huit"	Zwarte Sjaak, Brutus & Marcus	5:26
7.	"Neem Me Niet Kwalijk"		3:58
8.	"Zondag Vrij"	Jayh	3:08
9.	"9 van de 10"		4:40
10.	"SpeEeZz"	Jayh	5:56
11.	"Liefde"	Michael Bryan	4:54
12.	"Levenslessen"	Tim Beumers	3:55
13.	"Geef Me Nog Een Kans"	Brace	4:14
14.	"Dankbaar"	Suzanna Lubrano	4:56

== Charts ==
Chart (2008)	Peak position
Dutch Albums Chart	56

=== Singles ===
Title	Year	Peak chart positions
Title	Year	NLD
"Kamervragen"	2008	14
