= Janet Ossebaard =

Dutch conspiracy theorist (1966–2023)

Janet Ossebaard (1966 - ca. 16 November 2023) was a Dutch documentary filmmaker, photographer, writer, cereologist (crop circle researcher), and conspiracy theorist. She became known for her writing about crop circles, and later for her 2020 documentary Fall of the Cabal, which supported the QAnon conspiracy theory and contained misinformation regarding the COVID-19 pandemic.

== Early life ==
Janet Ossebaard was born in Deventer in 1966. She grew up in Bathmen in Overijssel, and studied English Language and Literature at the University of Groningen. After her studies, Ossebaard founded her own company which provided communication training. Ossebaard was also active as a freelance coach and trainer and completed training as a naturopathic therapist. In addition, she managed an online store where she sold crop circle paraphernalia.

== Conspiracy theories ==
=== Crop circles ===
In 1994, Ossebaard came across a crop circle near the village of Witten, close to Assen in the province of Drenthe. By her own account, this was a turning point in her life, and as a result, she left her life as an entrepreneur for a quest to find the origins of crop circles.

Ossebaard subsequently became an independent crop circle researcher and spent every summer from 1995 onwards in Southern England investigating them and developing expertise in English crop circles and other anomalies. Ossebaard produced her first documentaries about crop circles in the late 1990s. During her research, Ossebaard became increasingly convinced of an extraterrestrial origin for crop circles, reinforced by the fact that she had witnessed the formation of a crop circle three times. In addition, during this time Ossebaard was concerned with the question of whether the creatures in the works of J.R.R. Tolkien actually existed.

In 2005 Ossebaard became chair of the Dutch Centre for Crop Circle Studies and between 2015 and 2018 she was the chair of the Crop Circle Centre in Deventer. She continued to publish on this subject throughout her life.

=== QAnon and COVID-19 ===
In 2019, Ossebaard released her ten-part video series The Fall of the Cabal, which connects themes from various conspiracy theories. According to Ossebaard, "The Cabal" refers to a global elite including the Illuminati and elite pedophile networks that seek to bring down civilization. Within her theory, the world is ruled by a conspiracy involving, among others, the Rothschild family and Bill Gates. The main proponents of this conspiracy are said to be QAnon and Donald Trump. The series also contains anti-Semitic conspiracies, including support for the Protocols of the Elders of Zion and myths regarding Khazars and George Soros.

Sociologist J.M. Wright characterizes Ossebaard's "The Fall of the Cabal" as a general introduction to the "QAnon religion". Another ethnological study of QAnon followers confirms the influence and formative effect of Ossebaard's documentary on this community. Ossebaard's documentary has been described as liturgical material within the overall QAnon conspiracy theory.

Ossebaard had been a supporter of the QAnon conspiracy theory since 2017 and is seen as a key figure in the spread of QAnon ideology in the Low Countries during the start of the COVID-19 pandemic. According to criminologist Fiore Geelhoed, Ossebaard's conspiracy theories are characterized by a combination of "QAnon ideology regarding child abuse with ideas about the influence of aliens on Earth and damage caused by chemtrails, vaccines and 5G masts".

During the start of the COVID-19 pandemic in the Netherlands, Ossebaard came back into the public eye. The series "The Fall of the Cabal", which until 2020 had only heen shown in small venues and on DVD, was subsequently uploaded on YouTube. Shortly thereafter, she published a four-part sequel, in which, among other things, a connection was made between the Cabal conspiracy, 5G, and the COVID-19 pandemic. In March 2020, Ossebaard appeared as a corona expert on the program Het Panel van Ongehoord Nederland. In August 2020, national controversy arose surrounding Ossebaard when she openly fantasized about carrying out an attack on then-Prime Minister Mark Rutte in a podcast with rapper Lange Frans.

== Death ==
Ossebaard had been missing for several weeks since November 16, 2023, and on December 22 she was found dead in her camper in Sweden. According to the police in Lund, she had taken her own life, presumably on the day of her disappearance.

Following Ossebaard's death, her partner Cyntha Koeter stated that Ossebaard suffered from anxiety and depression and had taken an overdose of medication. In response to conspiracy theorists who expressed doubts about Ossebaard's death, Koeter explicitly emphasized that Ossebaard had not been beamed up by a UFO, was not being hidden by Q, murdered by the Cabal or Koeter herself, nor had Ossebaard started a new life.

== Bibliography ==
- Meder, Theo (2006). In graancirkelkringen: een etnologisch onderzoek naar verhalen uit de grenswetenschap (in Dutch). Amsterdam University Press. ISBN 978-90-5356-838-5.
