= TelSell =

Teleshopping channel broadcast in the UK

TelSell is a teleshopping channel broadcast in the United Kingdom on Sky Digital. It was on channel 649 when it was broadcast, offering a range of products such as the Vibromass.

In November 2007 the company was under criticism, after customers' credit card information was obtained by hackers. The company failed to inform their customers, claiming it was not their responsibility.

A Dutch court has declared the Dutch-based home shopping networks Tel Sell and LiveShop bankrupt on 9 January 2008. However, TelSell returned to Dutch TV only a few months later.
