= Def Rhymz =

Surinamese and Dutch rapper (1970–2024)

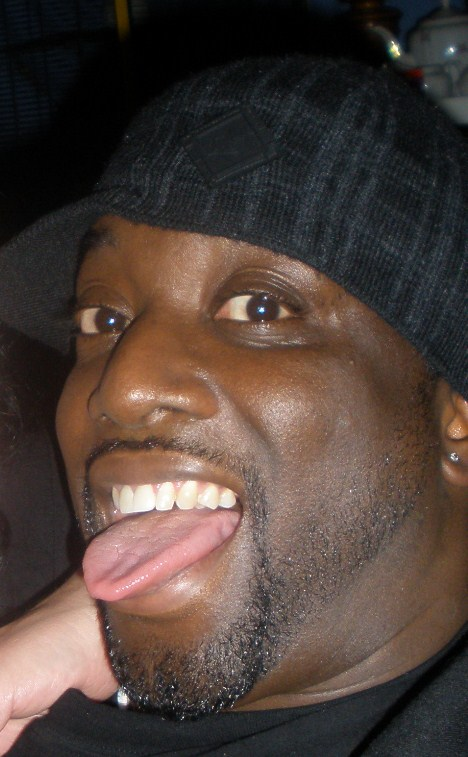
- Bouman in 2008

Background information
- Born: Dennis Bouman; 3 May 1970; Paramaribo, Suriname
- Died: 24 March 2024 (aged 53) Utrecht, Netherlands
- Genres: Hip hop, pop
- Occupation: Rapper
- Years active: 1986–2024

Dennis Bouman (3 May 1970 – 24 March 2024), known professionally as Def Rhymz, was a Surinamese-Dutch rapper best known for his humouristic raps.

== Biography ==
Bouman was born on 3 May 1970. He was the first Dutch rapper ever to hit the number 1 spot on the Dutch Charts, with two songs: "Doekoe" in 1999 and "Schudden" in 2001.

Bouman went on to collaborate with the otherwise English-language trio Postmen on a cover version of "De Bom ", the chart-topping 1982-hit by pop/reggae-band Doe Maar for inclusion on a tribute-album.

Besides performing, Bouman also worked as a head-chef.

Bouman died of heart failure on 24 March 2024, at the age of 53.

== See also ==
- List of Dutch hip hop musicians
