= Ziggi Recado =

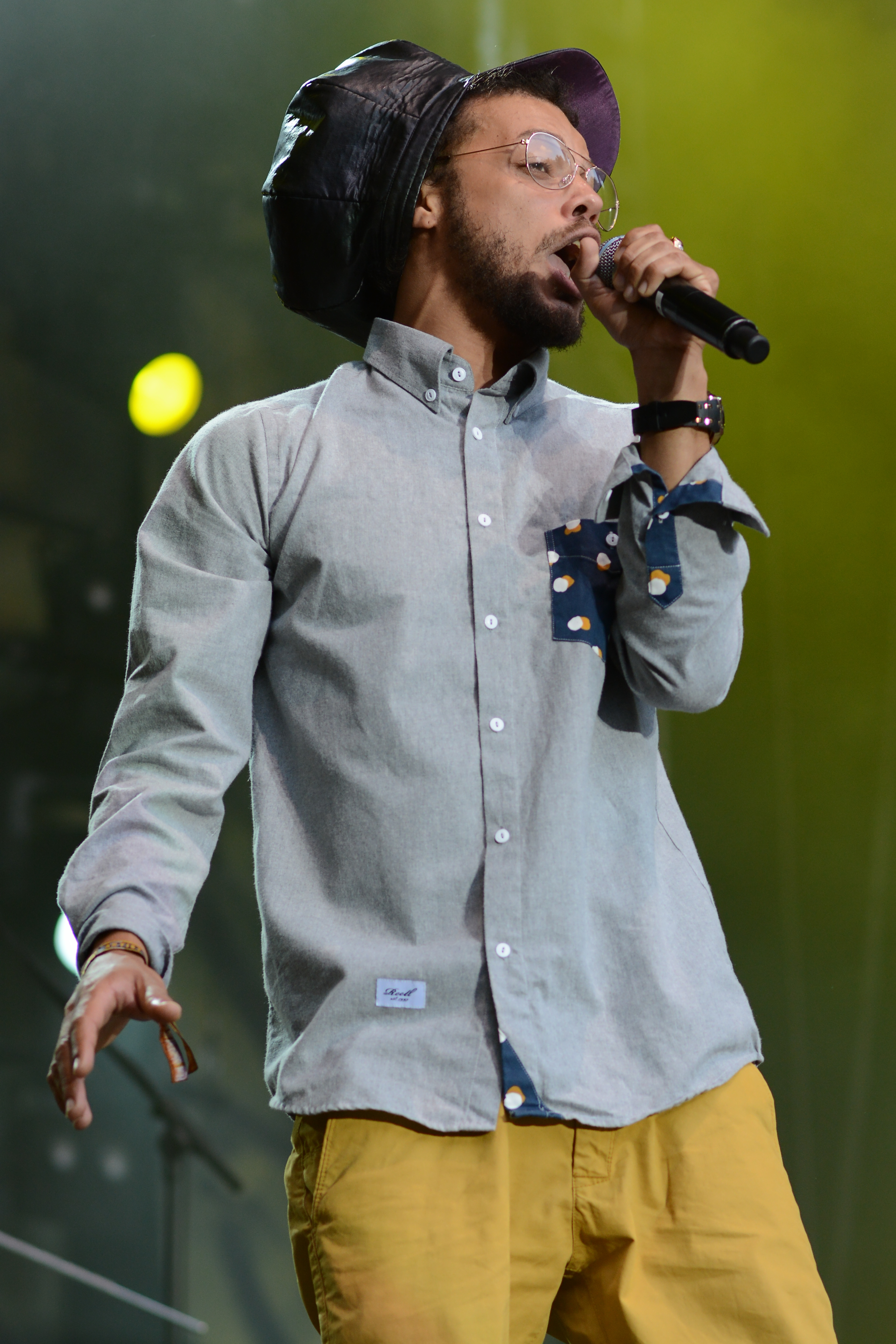

Background information
- Born: Ivan Ricardo Blijden; 1981 (age 44–45); Rotterdam, South Holland, Netherlands
- Origin: St.Eustatius
- Genres: Reggae/Dancehall/Unique
- Occupation: Recording Artist
- Years active: 2006–present
- Label: Nayamari Music
- Website: www.ziggi-recado.com

Ricardo Blijden (born 1981 in Rotterdam, Netherlands), better known by his stage name Ziggi Recado, is a Dutch reggae singer of Statian descent.

Blijden's music ranges from reggae & roots to dancehall and alternative music. Blijden has performed at the Roskilde Festival in Denmark, Lowlands Festival in the Netherlands, Festineuch (Switzerland), Coleur Café (Belgium), Cabaret Sauvage (France), Super Bock Fest (Portugal), and Reggae on the River (California).

Originally from Sint Eustatius, Blijden currently resides in Amsterdam, Netherlands. His grand parents gave him the nickname Ziggi. In 1999 Blijdenmoved to the Netherlands to study. Through the influence of friends who were aspiring artists, Ziggi began experimenting with music around 2002.

In 2004 Blijden was signed to Rock(N)Vibes entertainment which became Ziggi's first Label/Management. In February 2006, he released his debut album So Much Reasons. This album gave Blijden awards such as “Best Album”, “Best Artist” and “Best Live Act”. His track “Blaze it” peaked at the No. 1 position in the official German reggae charts for weeks.

In 2008, with the cooperation of VP/Greensleeves records, Blijden's 2nd studio album In Transit was released. This album which included the hit songs “Need to tell you this” and “Gonna leave you”. In 2009, Blijden and The Renaissance band played over 100 shows.

In 2011 Blijden's third studio album, the self entitled Ziggi Recado was released by VP records. In this album, Blijden combined a wide range of musical styles. He also produced a large portion of this album himself for the first time. This album contained the hit single "Mary".

On 8 March 2012 Blijden released the EP Liberation. In November 2012, Liberation 2.0 was released by Dreddarecords. This EP contained the single "Liberation". In May 2014, Blijden release his last full-length album, Therapeutic undern Zion High Productions.

Blijden's EP, Ivan the Terrible, was due in September 2016.

== Discography ==
=== Studio albums ===
- In Transit (2008)
- Same Difference (EP 2010)
- Ziggi Recado (2011)
- Liberation (EP 2012)
- Liberation 2.0 (EP 2012)
- Therapeutic (2014)
- Ivan The Terrible (EP 2016)
- The Commission (EP 2017)
