= Brainpower =

Dutch rapper

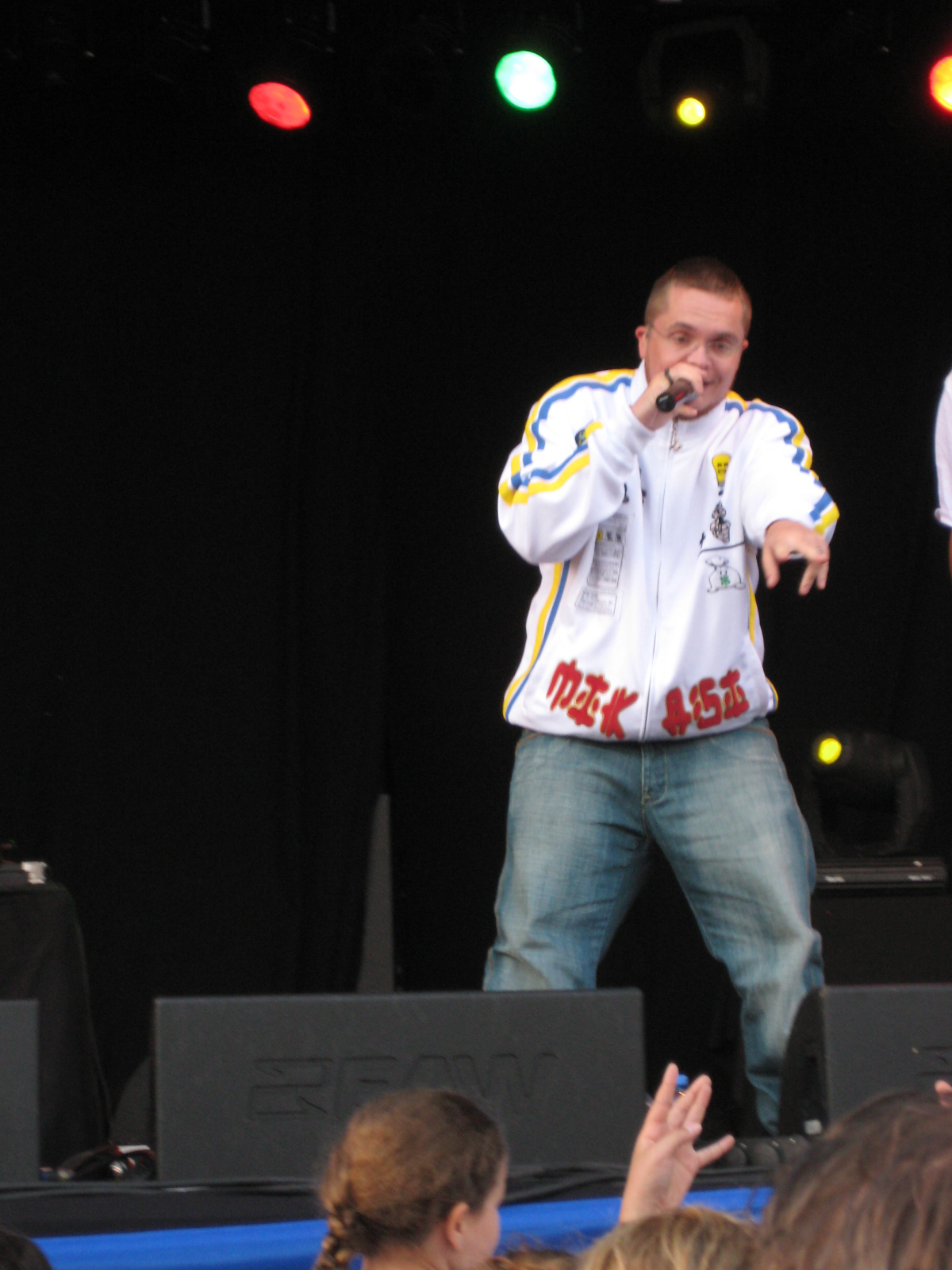
- Brainpower rapping in 2007

Background information
- Born: Gerrit-Jan Mulder; 5 February 1975 (age 51); Antwerp, Belgium
- Origin: Alphen aan den Rijn, Netherlands
- Genre: Nederhop
- Occupation: Rapper
- Instrument: Vocals
- Years active: 1998–present
- Website: Official website

Gertjan Mulder (born February 5, 1975), better known as Brainpower, is a Dutch rapper. Born in Belgium, he grew up in the Netherlands.

== Early life ==
Gerrit-Jan Mulder was born in Antwerp, Belgium, and raised in Alphen aan den Rijn, Netherlands. He started rapping in the mid-1980s before returning to his mother's native Amsterdam in the 1990s.

== Career ==
=== 1998–2001: Career beginnings, features and debut album ===
Mulder's career started in 1998 when he entered the Grote Prijs van Nederland, a national talent show for Dutch musicians.

In 1999, he was featured on Extince's track "Zoete Inval", and was featured in "Als niet Als" by Doe Maar in 2000. In that same year, he released his first single, "Door Merg en Brain", followed in 2001 by the release of his debut album of the same title.

=== 2002–2003: Verschil Moet Er Zijn and live album ===
In 2002, Brainpower released his second album Verschil Moet Er Zijn. The same year, he started a rap group called ADHD. "Dansplaat" ("Dance Track") served as the album's lead single; it topped the charts in the Netherlands and Belgium. He also won the MTV Award for best Dutch act.

In 2003, he released a live album, containing songs from his studio albums. It was followed by an 18-month tour.

=== 2004–2008: ADHD and subsequent solo releases ===
The group ADHD released their first album in 2004, and the following year, Brainpower released his third solo album, Even Stil.

In 2006, he starred in a small role in Afblijven. His next album, Hart/Hard was a double album released in 2008.

=== 2009 ===
In 2009, he released his Greatest Hits Box Set, consisting of 2 CDs and 1 DVD with all 30 videos he has released over the years. The set is titled 'Mijn Manier' ('My Way') and 19 September sees the first gig of an intense 36-date Tour throughout the Benelux. Animation studios LEMONADE and Advertisement Agency DSRPT developed a limited edition Brainpower Vinyl Art Figure, especially for the cover of this Greatest hits Box Set.

He won two platinum awards: A triple Platinum Award for being the best-selling Dutch language solo MC of all time. Another one for Platinum sales in Belgium and his 2002 Hit Single also reaches gold status in Belgium.

=== 2010 ===
In 2010 Brainpower performed with reggae/dancehall legend King Yellowman in Jamaica and played selected festivals throughout the Netherlands & Belgium. He dropped 'Dub & Dwars' a record containing re-recorded reggae versions of his biggest tunes. With superb riddims, partially recorded in Jamaica, produced by the Fire House Crew and Dutch producer Asher E. as well as Brainpower himself, the album hits the #1 spot in both the Reggae charts for iTunes as well as BOL. In November, he dropped a track and a video with Jean Grae. December 2010 marks the rapper's first Cali performance when he plays at The Viper Room on Sunset Boulevard in Los Angeles (USA).

=== 2011 ===
On 16 April he released the song and video for "Mic Bizniz" featuring Jamaican Music Legend Yellowman, often referred to as The King of Dancehall. There is also a mini-documentary called 'Amsterdam To Kingston' featuring exclusive footage of Brainpower performing with Yellowman and an interview with Reggae Legend John Holt amongst others. The single was not only a digital release but also came out as a 7-inch on Yellow colored vinyl for Record Store Day.

In August he put out a new song and video called 'Light It Up' which was picked up for use in 'Body Language', a movie in which Brainpower also plays a small role as a cab-driver. The movie hit #1 in the Netherlands. 30 September saw the release of a new song "People", the first single of the upcoming album, for which the accompanying video was shot in New York.

=== 2012 ===
In 2012 Brainpower performed in Europe & the Dutch Caribbean and released several tracks, like 'Sometimes' (also featured in the 'Body Language' movie), plus two collaborations in Dutch: 'Een Mooi Bericht' ft Anthony Heidweiller, a collab with an opera singer via the world renowned Concertgebouw.

In the summer of 2012, he dropped the free EP 'The New York Sessions' featuring Jean Grae, Mr Len, Ced Gee of the Ultramagnetic MCs & more. The same year, he became an Ambassador for F.E.L.I.S., a multi functional center in Curaçao (Dutch Caribbean) that helps support children and also combats short-term and long-term poverty. Famous Surinam/Dutch TV personality Jorgen Raymann fully supports Brainpower & F.E.L.I.S. Even Rohan Marley, son of reggae legend Bob Marley donates some stuff to the Foundation. He served as an ambassador for the National Sports Week in the Netherlands, motivating the youth to work out.

Brainpower received his first Hollywood movie placement in August 2012. On 24 August, the movie Thunderstruck was released in the US. It featured one of Brainpower's unreleased songs.

=== 2013 ===
On 10 December, the Collabs EP, a collection of songs, recorded with some of the many artists Brainpower grew up listening to, was released. On November 15, one of Brainpower’s songs, Mijn Manier, was featured on the podcast 'Welcome To Night Vale' as the weather for the episode Lazy Day.

=== 2014 ===
He worked with DJ duo Moombahteam on the song 'Drop That Kick' - the song received a warm reception and was a success, ending up at #3 in the iTunes top 100 in Cambodia. After playing festivals in the summer of 2014, Brainpower released his new single "Troubled Soul" on 3 October. The song's rap lyrics were all written by Brainpower while lyrics for the book were written and produced by Brainpower & TJ. The video for this song is actually a short film written and directed by upcoming director Ruwan Heggelman. On 17 December, a new single (and video) called "Rock" was released.

=== 2015 ===
Both singles are taken from the new album Determination, released on 19 January. On 6 February, his 2005 album, Even Stil was released in the Universal Music Deluxe Edition series. Both the new album and the re-issued one entered the Top 100 charts. On 27 February, a new video was released for the song "Don't Let Go" ft Keith John. Brainpower wrapped up a 75-date tour that ended on 1 June.

Brainpower was one of the first artists to ever release a full stereoscopic Virtual Reality music video experience. In June he finished his translation of Shakespeare's Othello. Theatre Group ZEP asked him to make a modern-day rap version of the classic play. The play premiered on 29 September.

=== 2016 ===
In June he finishes his translation of Shakespeare's 'Hamlet'. Theatre Group ZEP asked him to make a modern-day rap version of the classic play. The play premiered on 30 September 2016 to rave reviews, that day was also the start of a 70-date tour.

Brainpower writes songs with longtime friends Orange Grove, a St Maarten-based Reggae-rock crossover band, and tours the Caribbean with them throughout the summer of 2016. they play Aruba, Curaçao, Bonaire, St Maarten & St Barths. His brand new single 'All The Same' featuring Orange Grove is currently getting airplay by dozens of radio stations in multiple countries. The official video release is on 28 October.

=== 2017 ===
Brainpower tours throughout the year to celebrate the 15th Anniversary of his groundbreaking album 'Verschil Moet er Zijn' and also releases a Limited Anniversary Edition of that record. December 2017 he releases his first signature microphone with sEelectronics - the Limited Brainpower V7 microphone

=== 2018 ===
In January and February Brainpower performs during 14 sold-out shows in front of 190,000 people as part of the Vrienden Van Amstel concept. On 29 March he performs as the first Hip Hop Artist ever in a popular Live TV Show called the Passion. The show has over 3.7 million viewers. In April he wins the Global Peace Song Award for the song 'All The Same' in the category Hip Hop. Amongst the Jury Panel members is Stewart Copeland from iconic band The Police.

That summer his song 'Animal Sauvage' ends up in the global #1 Blockbuster 'The Equalizer 2', directed by Antoine Fuqua and starring Denzel Washington. Antoine's team asked Brainpower to deliver music for this film.

=== 2019 ===
Brainpower releases 14 singles. Also, a greatest hits tape was released called '1999–2019 - The Best Of Brainpower', which, at first, was only available as part of an art piece by Tilburg artist HIPPESHIT013. The art piece is a portrait of Brainpower painted over 160 Gold cassettes and is called: The Golden Tapes Session.

=== 2020 ===
This year, the prolific artist releases 15 singles and embarks on a club tour. Due to the pandemic and lots of rescheduling, the tour ended in late 2021.

=== 2021 ===
In 2021 his 9th studio 'Barlito's Way' is released on April 27, known as King's Day in Holland. November 26 a Deluxe Edition with 10 extra tracks is released. His debut album 'Door Merg & Brain' is released on double-vinyl in 3 colorways for Record Store Day and sells out in seconds. On Black Friday, three new colorways are released. There is also a Best Of album dropped, 'BARS: The Best Of Brainpower' as a Vinyl exclusive in three colorways.

=== 2022 ===
His sophomore album 'Verschil Moet Er Zijn' is released as a 20th Anniversary Deluxe Concerto Edition in 2 elaborate double vinyl versions with slipmats on Sept 30th. 'Verschil Moet Er Zijn - The 20th anniversary Bonus Bundle' dropped on April 27. 'The New York Sessions 10th Anniversary Edition' came out on August 22.

September 7, Brainpower announces a new theater college tour, consisting of 26 dates.

=== Songwriting ===
Brainpower co-wrote "Finsbury Park '67" with Candy Dulfer, a song that ended up #1 on the USA Smooth Jazz Chart. As a songwriter Brainpower has also co-written songs for singers like Eva Simons, Edsilia Rombley, Hansen Thomas, Brace and the classic Dutch youth project Kinderen Voor Kinderen volumes 32, 33, 34 & 37. The last three mentioned are all certified platinum.

One of his songs "Love Meee" co-written with Allan Eshuijs & Marco Rakascan ended up on Japanese band Kis-My-Ft2's latest album, that reached #1 in Japan. The album sold 350,000 copies and is certified platinum by the RIAJ.

== Discography ==
=== Albums ===
- The Freestyles Chapter (1999)
- Door merg & brain (2001)
- Verschil met er zijn (2002)
- The Box P.U.R.E Session (Live Album) (2003)
- Even stil (2005)
- Datvinnikcoke (2006)
- Hart/Hard (2008)
- Determination (2015)
- Barlito's Way (2021)

=== Compilation ===
- BARS: The Best of Brainpower (2021)

=== EPs / side-projects ===
- Lyricist EP (LYRIC, 1999)
- ADHD - self-titled album of side project group ADHD (2004)
- The New York Sessions EP (2012)
- The Collabs EP (2013)

=== Singles ===
- "De Achtervolging" (1998)
- "Lyricist" (1999)
- "Als niet als" (2000) (with Doe Maar and Def P.)
- "Door merg en brain" (2000)
- "MC Vol overgave" (2000)
- "De vierde kaart" (2001)
- "Wat een Jinx is" (2001)
- "Je moest waarschijnlijk gaan" (2001)
- "Dansplaat" (2002)
- "Voel de Vibe" (2002)
- "One Mic (remix) / Made You Look" (with Nas) (2002)
- "Schreeuwetuit!" (2003)
- "Beng Je Hoofd" (2004)
- "Shouf Shouf Habibi" (2004)
- "Pro" (12-inch, 2005)
- "Alles" (2005)
- "Even stil" (2005)
- Vlinders ("Butterflies", 2006)
- "Non Stop" (2007)
- "The Chosen" (duet with Intwine) (2007)
- "Cut Me Loose" (with Intwine) (2008)
- Eigen Werk ("Own Work", 2008)
- "Boks ouwe" (2008)
- "Wees niet bang" (2009)
- "Mijn manier" (2009)
- "Mind Ur Bizniz" (feat. Jean Grae) (2010)
- "Vierde Kaart Dub" (2010)
- "Bleedin' Organz" (feat. Shabazz the Disciple) (2011)
- "Mic Bizniz" (feat. Yellowman) (2011)
- "Emcee Fluid" (feat. Block McCloud, Mr Metaphore (a.k.a. Marc Bars) & Thirstin Howl III) (2012)
- "People" (2011)
- "Sometimes" (2012)
- "Dubbelportret" (with Zanillya Farrell) (2012)
- "Hing, Hing, Hing" (2012)
- "The Universal Funk" (feat. PMD) (2013)
- "Troubled Soul" (2014)
- "Don't Let Go" (2015)
- "Nothing" (2015)
- "100" (2025)

=== As featured artist ===
- "Zoete inval" - Extince featuring Brainpower, Murth the Man-O-Script, Yukkie B, Krecial, Skate the Great, Goldy & Scuz (1999)
