= Brutus (rapper) =

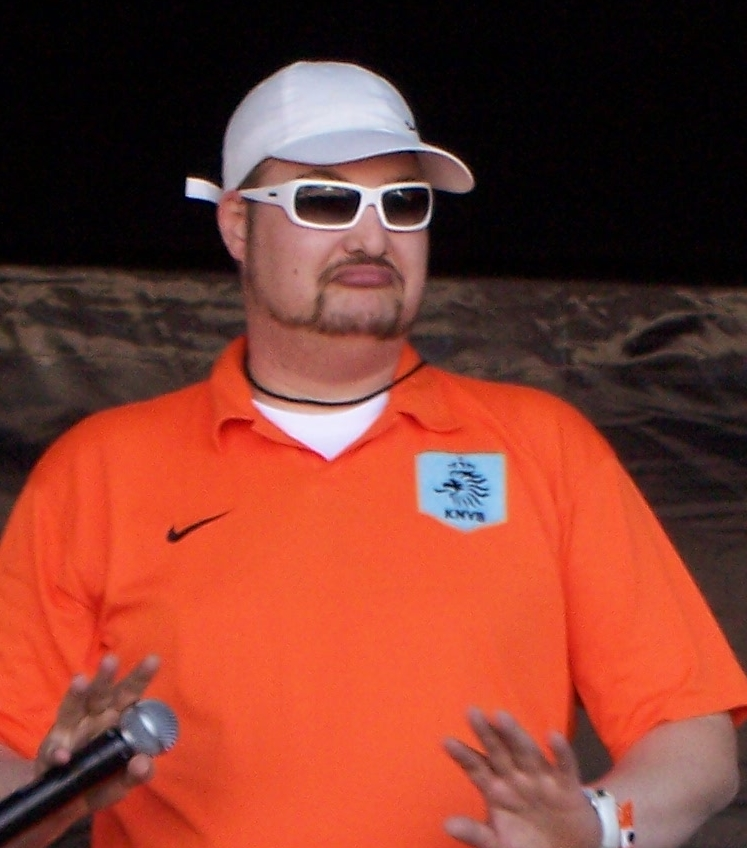

Background information
- Born: Thijs Frederiks; April 23, 1983 (age 43); Amsterdam, Netherlands
- Origin: Diemen, Netherlands
- Genres: Hip hop, Urban music
- Occupations: Rapper, radio personality
- Years active: 1996 – present
- Label: TopNotch
- Website: Official Site

Thijs Frederiks, better known by his stage name Brutus, (born in Amsterdam on 23 April 1983) is a Dutch rapper originating from Diemen, Netherlands. Alongside his older brother Lange Frans and rapper-singer better known as Baas B was a founding member of D-Men and the band's manager.

Brutus had important recordings on De Straatremixes series of three D-Men mixtapes and cooperation with other D-Men members (rappers, singers and DJs) Lange Frans, Baas B, Negativ, Yes-R, Brace, C-Ronic and also with Darryl, The Opposites and Riza.

His big break came with the success of the single "Mijn Feestje" credited to Brutus and Negativ. It reached #28 on the Dutch Singles Chart, staying 6 weeks on the chart.

In 2006, he was featured in a release of single "Ik wacht al zo lang" credited to Lange Frans featuring Brutus and Tim van Di-Rect (real name Tim Akkerman) and reaching #18 in the Dutch Singles Chart.

He also has solo singles "Net als jij" and "Gedachtegang" and is featured in Lange Frans' single "Flappen"

== Personal life ==
- In 2006 in partnership with his brother Lange Frans (real name Frans Christiaan Frederiks), he presented a weekly radio show at Dutch hip hop station Lijn5.
- Brutus lives with his girlfriend Janneke de Ridder and they have a son named Robbe (born 26 May 2009).

== Discography ==
=== Albums ===
- 2007: Gedachtegang
- 2009: Thijstijd

=== Mixtapes ===
(Refer to D-Men discography)

=== Singles ===
Year	Single	Peak chart positions		Album
Year	Single	NED Dutch Top 40	NED Single Top 100	Album
2007	"Net als jij"		26	
2007	"Flappen" (feat. Lange Frans and Zwarte Sjaak)"		–	

Featured in

Year	Single	Peak chart positions		Album
Year	Single	NED Dutch Top 40	NED Single Top 100	Album
2005	"Mijn Feestje" (D-Men feat. Brutus and Negativ)		27	
2006	"Ik wacht al zo lang" (Lange Frans featuring Brutus and Tim)		16	
