= D-Men =

Dutch hip hop group

Background information
- Origin: Diemen and Amsterdam, Netherlands
- Genre: Dutch hip hop
- Years active: 1997 – 2005
- Label: D-Men Entertainment
- Members: Lange Frans (rapper); Brutus (rapper, beatmaster)
- Past members: Baas B (rapper, singer); Brace (singer); C-Ronic (rapper); DJ MBA (DJ); Negativ (rapper); Soesi B (rapper); Yes-R (rapper)

D-Men was a Dutch rap formation established in 1997 under the name D-Men Squad. This was after a freestyle session they held on a basketball court in Diemen-Zuid. The original members of D-Men were rapper Lange Frans, his brother rapper Brutus and a childhood friend rapper-singer Bart Zeilstra better known as Baas B. They picked the name that sound like their home town Diemen. Many others joined in the formation, famous for its mixtapes De Straatremixes. D-Men also have their own record label named D-Men Entertainment.

== Members ==
Besides the three founding members, many joined in the group that its heyday had the following members:

Original members

- Lange Frans (rapper)
- Baas B (rapper/singer)
- Brutus (rapper)

Joining members

- Negativ (rapper)
- DJ MBA (DJ)
- Yes-R (rapper)
- Brace (singer)
- Soesi B (rapper)
- C-Ronic (rapper)

== Career ==
In 1997, the band's original trio started at various small venues. As D-Men they released their first single in 1999, entitled "Zoveel Mensen" ("So Many People"), and they won a talent hunt that was organised by Stichting Grap ("Joke Foundation") in 2001. With the joining of new members, the name was changed to D-Men Entertainment with the inclusion of Negativ, DJ MBA, Brace, Yes-R, Soesi B and C-Ronic. D-Men regularly performed in many venues including in Amsterdam and released three mixtapes: The original De Straatremixes in 2003, followed by De Straatremixes Deel 2 and De Straatremixes Deel 2 both in 2004. Most are parodies of American urban sounds. A sequel was also planned to be titled Rollen met D-Men, but this did not materialize.

The band started breaking up with the departure of singer Brace, followed by rapper Ali B. A single "Vraag jezelf eens af" was released. Contractual disagreements intensified with rapper Yes-R who joined the label of his cousin Ali B. Soesi B, a friend from childhood to Yes-R followed suit. The last of the new members to leave was Negativ. This the formation went back to the original three members Lange Frans, Brutus and Baas B. After leaving D-men, Yes-r made a recording with them called "Je krijgt het van ons" ("You get it from us").

D-Men decided to disband. In 2008, Lange Frans and Baas B declared on Juize.FM that a follow-up release was planned entitled De Straatremixes Deel 4. Negativ was positive and expected that at least some of the other members would come back. BUt this never materialized.

D-Men was replaced by the duo Lange Frans & Baas B

== D-Men Entertainment ==
D-Men have established their own Record label called D-Men Entertainment.

== Discography ==
=== Mixtapes ===
- 2003: De Straatremixes
- 2004: De Straatremixes Deel 2
- 2004: De Straatremixes Deel 3

=== Singles ===
Year	Single	Peak chart positions		Album
Year	Single	NED Dutch Top 40	NED Single Top 100	Album
2004	"Mijn Feestje" (feat. Negativ & Brutus)"		27	
