= Brace (singer) =

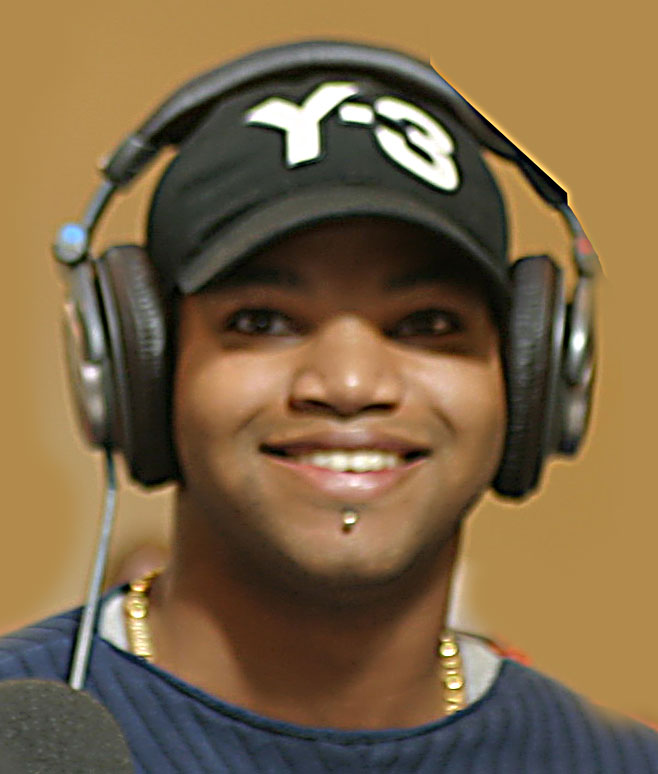

Background information
- Also known as: Brace
- Born: Eddy Brace Rashid MacDonald; 23 August 1986 (age 40); Surabaya, Indonesia
- Genres: Hip hop, R&B
- Instrument: singing
- Years active: 2004–present
- Website: www.bracemusic.nl

Eddy Brace Rashid MacDonald (born 23 August 1986), shortened to Brace, is a Dutch singer. He is best known for his collaborations with Dutch rapper Ali B, who helped to bring Brace to stardom after their first musical collaboration on the hit single "Ik ben je zat" released in the summer of 2004.

== Early life ==
Brace was born in Surabaya, Indonesia, as a child of Surinamese parents. The family moved to the Netherlands, where he was raised in Amsterdam. His father Eddy MacDonald is a songwriter and his brother is a singer in the R&B groups K Shaw and VIP Allstars. Since he was eleven years old, he began to perform regularly on German stages, because his act was considered too young in the Netherlands.

When Brace was 15, his father died. After this traumatic experience, the young singer would not go to school and he put his focus on his singing career. He practiced his freestyle sessions in the garden shed of Lange Frans' parents. Together with Lange Frans, Brutus, Negativ, Yes-R, he was part of the hip hop group called D-Men.

He won the Talent of the Kwakoe Summer Festival and went to win the national finals of the Kunstbende in Utrecht.

== Music career ==
Rappers Lange Frans and Baas B who were established pop acts in the Netherlands, asked him to collaborate with them on the single Moppie. The single instantly topped the Netherlands Pop charts in the summer of 2004 and Brace made his national breakthrough.

Following the success of the hit single Moppie, Ali B recognized Brace's talent and worked with him on his song "Ik Ben Je Zat". The song reached the Top 5 in the Dutch charts, projecting Brace as a prominent vocalist.

On his first single, Vraag jezelf eens af, he is accompanied by Ali B with beatboxing.

The R&B artist impressed when he sang live in Amsterdam and played an important role in the tour Ali B vertelt het leven van de straat (English translation " Ali B tells the life of the street"). The R&B artist also appeared on the radio programme 3VOOR12 where he sang Vraag jezelf eens af (English translation "ask Yourself"), a song that he sings on tour with Ali B.

In January 2005, Brace participated at Noorderslag festival and following his performance with the tunes Verleiding and Lauw, a Dutch daily evening newspaper called NRC Handelsblad published a positive review of the R&B artist : "Brace sings with a beautiful, peaceful voice, an emotional song. It is the best time of urban Noorderslag! "

In 2006, he travelled to the United States to film the video clip for the single Drijfzand (14 April), which is an R&B mix by DJ Battlecat and a dance remix by Paul T.

He wrote a duet together with guitarist Dennis van Leeuwen of Dutch Rock group Kane, for the theme song Overleve' of the Dutch horror movie Sl8n8 (premiered 29 September 2006). One month later, Brace lent his vocals again on another single Wees Niet Bang with the collaboration of the solid guitar work of Van Leeuwen.

=== Album releases ===
4 November 2005 saw the release of his debut album Strijder (English translation " The Warrior"). Besides two promotional tracks titled Verleiding, then Lauw, the album is preceded by a second hit single in August, titled Hartendief (English translation "Heart Thief").

On 12 October 2007, he released his second album titled Dilemma.

=== Awards ===
In November 2005, it was announced on the Dutch Radio.nl that the winner of Essent Award was Brace. The Dutch Energy company Essent issues music awards ten times every year to support talented bands and artists. Each winner receives a promotional budget of Euro 5000, including media coverage and produced performances at big festivals. The ceremony took place on 14 January during Noorderslag 2006, where Brace performed.

=== International collaboration ===
Brace is one of very few Dutch artists to receive international exposure in the US, by establishing a professional relationship with Akon, the Senegalese-American R&B singer-songwriter. Notably, Brace featured with Colby O'Donis on the remix of Akon's chart topping number Beautiful, and he also participated with his American counterparts in the music video for the remix.

=== Career revival ===
As of December 2008, Brace's official website suggests that the Dutch artist has kept his career low-key, as no further appearances or music projects have occurred or were scheduled.

On 13 May 2011 Brace announced on radio that he signed to SPEC Entertainment. His rehabilitation enabled him to take part in the second season of the Ali B op volle toeren-programme exchanging songs with established artist Imca Marina; it was broadcast on 4 January 2012. In 2015 he competed on the sixth season of the Dutch reality singing competition The Voice of Holland; coached by Ali B he specialized in Dutch-language-ballads and finished third place.

Brace went on to record a single with Ali B and the popular reggae-singer Kenny B. In 2017 he joined the latter by taking part in the Beste Zangers-contest. The same year Brace appeared on the 18th season of Expeditie Robinson and Celebrity Stand-Up

== Legal Issues ==
In early 2010 newspapers reported that Brace was in prison since January 2010, which was confirmed by his management "Line-Up Events". It became clear that Brace had been involved in a kidnapping and physical abuse case. According to his own statements he had helped a friend try to get money from a tenant who refused to pay rent. Brace denies to have been aware of the kidnapping plan of his friends.

29 April 2010 Brace received a 16 months sentence with four months suspension for kidnapping, extortion and possession of a gun.

Brace was released from prison on 7 January 2011, for good behaviour.

== Humanitarian interest ==
During the MTV documentary Rap Around the world, the song Het Kind which is also the 3rd single from the album Strijder was produced during the stay of Brace in the Philippines to participate in the filming of the documentary about child trafficking. He collaborated with Ali B and mc's J-Rock. The accompanying video clip was also filmed there.

Part of the proceeds of Het Kind went to Plan Nederland which is a global humanitarian child-focused development organization. Annually, through the borders of the Philippines, thousands of children are used in human trafficking, especially girls. They have a life of exploitation and forced prostitution. Plan works with the Philippine Visayan Forum Foundation organization to put trafficking to a halt. They save children from the hands of child traffickers, ensure that children are taken care of, and be escorted to school.

In 2006, Brace was nominated one of the "ambassadors of liberty" and travelled in that capacity on 5 May 2006 to the Liberation Festivals in Assen, Groningen, Wageningen, Den Bosch and Roermond.

== Personal life ==
Brace began his solo career in Betondorp in Amsterdam. He had the support of his mother who is also his manager. In 2006, rumours surfaced about Brace's engagement to his girlfriend, but in a Press interview he denied the allegation, saying; "I only gave a ring to my girlfriend because I wanted to make a nice gesture to my beloved ". In the same interview, he joked that the only person he could ever cheat on his girlfriend with was Rihanna.

== Discography ==
=== Studio albums ===
- 2005: Strijder
- 2007: Dilemma

=== Singles ===
- 2004: Moppie
- 2004: Ik ben je zat
- 2005: Vraag jezelf eens af
- 2005: De Verleiding
- 2005: Leipe mocro flavour
- 2005: Hartendief
- 2005: Het kind
- 2006: Drijfzand
- 2006: Mammie
- 2006: Superster
- 2007: Pomp je booty
- 2007: Vijand
- 2007: Dilemma
- 2008: Zo donker zonder jou
