= Ali B =

Moroccan-Dutch rapper (born 1981)

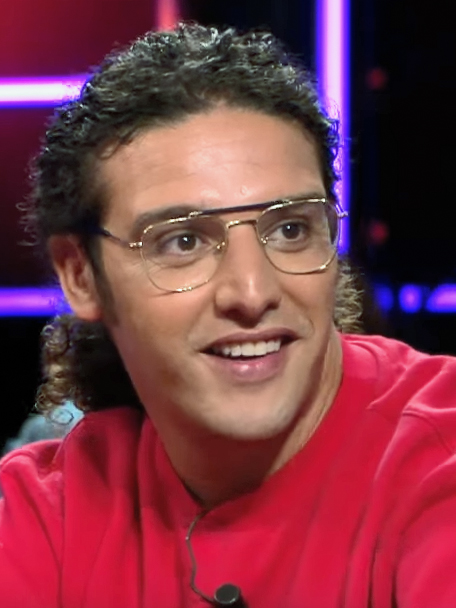
- Ali B in 2018
- Born: Ali Bouali; 16 October 1981 (age 45); Zaanstad, Netherlands
- Occupations: Rapper; singer-songwriter; television presenter; cabaret performer; stand-up comedian
- Spouse: Breghje Kommers
- Children: 3 sons
- Criminal information
- Criminal charge: Rape (2 counts)
- Penalty: 3 years imprisonment
- Website: alib.nl (in Dutch)

Ali Bouali (born 16 October 1981), known professionally as Ali B, is a Dutch rapper. He is one of the most prominent rappers in the Netherlands and has collaborated with musicians such as Akon and Marco Borsato. He is seen as a leading figure in Dutch inter-ethnic relations.

Ali B has released three albums and various singles, including the 2004 Dutch number-one hit "Wat zou je doen" with Marco Borsato. He has performed at national events including the 2005 Queen's Day celebration and the 2013 inauguration of Willem-Alexander. He has been a judge on the television talent shows The Voice of Holland, The Voice Kids, X Factor, Holland's Got Talent and Ali B op volle toeren.

In 2022, Bouali was accused of rape by multiple women in relation to the Voice of Holland scandal, causing him to lose many of his endorsement deals and positions. He was charged with two counts of rape and two counts of sexual assault. In 2024, he was sentenced to two years in prison after being convicted on one count of rape and one count of attempted rape. After Bouali's appeal, the charge of attempted rape was upgraded in 2026 to a full charge of rape, and his sentence was increased to three years.

== Life and music career ==
Ali B was born in Zaanstad and moved to Amsterdam's De Pijp neighbourhood when he was two, and later to Amsterdam-Oost. When he was 14, he moved to Almere. In his teenage years, he dealt drugs to make money, regularly smoked marijuana, and stole shoes from his local mosque. Seeking to set him straight, his mother made Ali B live with his grandparents in Morocco for ten months. He found refuge in Islam and rapping.

His 2004 collaboration with Marco Borsato, "Wat zou je doen", reached number one in the Netherlands with proceeds from sales going to the War Child charity organisation. He had further successful songs including "Leipe mocro flavor" and "Wij houden van Oranje", a remake of a football chant featuring original singer André Hazes.

In 2004, Ali B became the first rapper to receive a wax figure at Madame Tussauds Amsterdam. He collaborated with Akon on the international remix of his single "Ghetto". In 2006, Ali B was knighted as the "Baron of Ooit" in the children's theme park Land van Ooit and given a statue in the park's Main Street. He received the honor because the park felt that "he is committed to children in a special way."

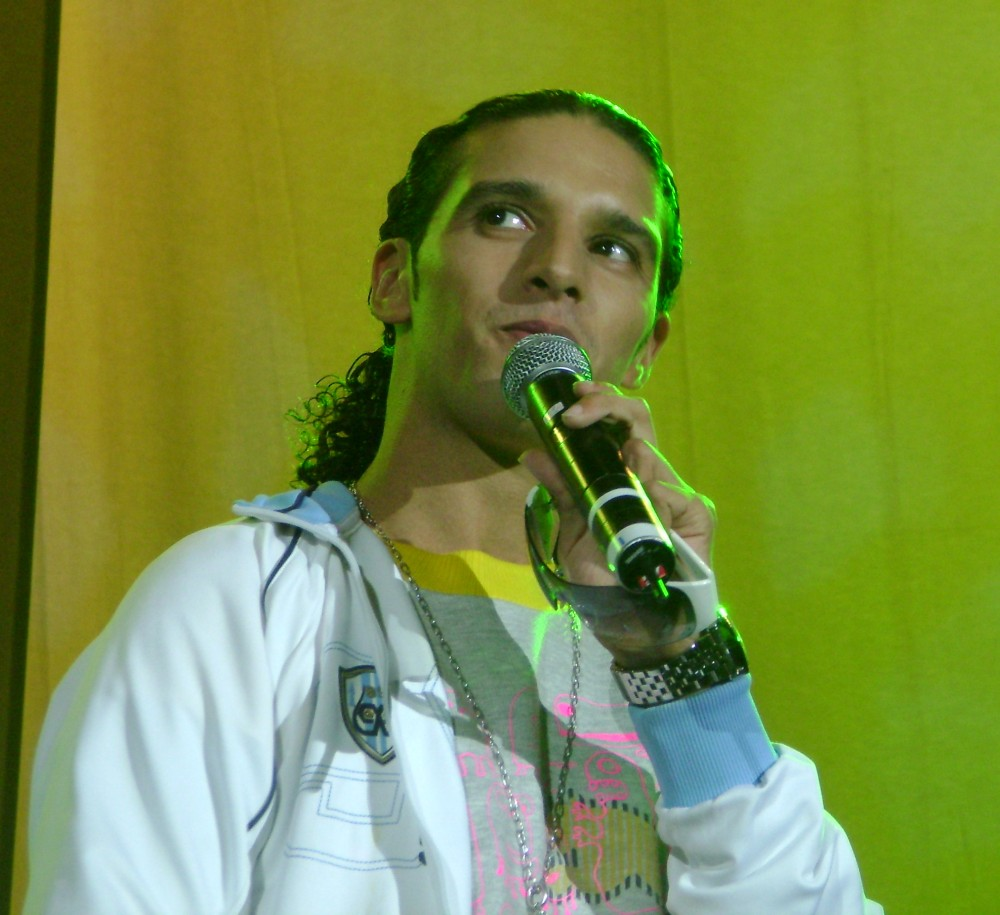
Ali B in 2008

After hugging Queen Beatrix at the 2005 Queen's Day celebration, he was often called the "knuffelmarokkaan" (cuddle Moroccan), which at first he did not like because it suggested he was only cuddly because of the low standards applied to Moroccans. However, he tried to paint the phrase in a more positive light.

In 2015, The Economist noted how his "empathetic moments have probably done more to promote Dutch acceptance of Muslims than any policy could have achieved." This came amongst growing anti-Muslim tensions in the Netherlands owing to the rising popularity of far-right politician Geert Wilders and his Party for Freedom. It was noted that Ali B was such a cross-cultural icon that he "is the one prominent Moroccan-Dutch figure whom the PVV’s leaders never attack."

In 2017, Ali B's song "That is Money" caused controversy over the lyric "sits on money like a Jew." Ali B said that the lyric was not antisemitic because he was "calling them good businesspeople." He eventually apologised to the Central Jewish Organisation.

In 2020, Ali B started "Ik Wil Groeien" (I Want to Grow), an online coaching and self-help platform. In 2021, he published the book De Ali B-Methode (The Ali B Method), featuring 12 life lessons shared by him.

Following accusations of sexual assault and rape in 2022, two of which became criminal convictions in 2024, companies severed ties with Ali B. Maven Publishing ceased all printing and sales of his book The Ali B Method, and LikeMeat pulled his "Mocro Flavour" vegetarian chicken brand from shelves. Telecom magnate Jasper de Rooij scrapped his planned million-dollar investment into an Ali B-promoted invention. RTL Nederland removed Ali B as a judge from all its programs, NPO 1 announced it would no longer play Ali B songs on the radio, and many Dutch celebrities unfollowed him on Instagram.

== Television career ==
Ali B is also known for his roles in television. In 2011 he was given his own television-show for broadcast on TROS -station; Ali B op volle toeren invites young rappers and (established) artists of other genres to make cover-versions of each other songs. In 2013, he served as a mentor on X Factor. From 2013 to 2022, Ali B served as a coach on The Voice of Holland (replacing Roel van Velzen). He was featured as a coach on The Voice Kids (replacing Nick & Simon) from 2016 to 2021 and became the winning coach three times with his artists Iris Verhoek, Silver Metz, and Emma Kok. In 2020, he served as a judge on Holland's Got Talent. In 2016, Ali B released a single with long-time collaborator Brace and chart-topping reggae-artist Kenny B. He served as judge in 2020 and 2021 in the singing talent show We Want More.

In 2017 he made his acting debut in the Belgian movie Patser which premiered in early 2018.

After his rape conviction in 2024, AVROTROS took offline all TV programs that it had made in collaboration with Ali B. The public broadcaster had previously removed the TV program Ali B en de Muziekkaravaan.

== Personal life ==
Ali Bouali is married to Breghje Kommers, the half-sister of professional footballer Abel Tamata. They have three sons together. His cousin is Yes-R, who is also a rapper and television personality.

=== Rape conviction ===
In January 2022, the Dutch Public Prosecution Service received reports against Bouali for sexual misconduct, including one rape. This took place while he was working as a judge at The Voice of Holland, as reported by the Dutch YouTube show BOOS episode "This is the Voice". Bouali denied all allegations. In March 2023, he was charged with two rapes and two assaults, with a total of three victims. The incidents occurred between 2014 and 2018 in Morocco, Amsterdam, and Heiloo. Singer Ellen ten Damme accused Bouali of raping her in a hotel in Meknes during the recording of the show Ali B en de Muziekkaravaan. In another incident, he was accused of assaulting The Voice of Holland contestant Jill Helena in the Amsterdamse Bos. Bouali was also accused of non-consensually digitally penetrating a 20-year-old woman in Heiloo during a writer's camp while she was performing oral sex on rapper Ronnie Flex.

On 12 July 2024, Bouali was convicted on one count of rape for the incident in Heiloo and an additional count of attempted rape, and sentenced to two years in prison. According to the court, it could not be proven that he raped Ten Damme in 2014, but that it was provable that he had attempted to do so. Although the court considered the reports of the other assaults to be reliable, Bouali was acquitted of them due to a lack of supporting evidence. Both the defense and the prosecution indicated that they would appeal against the sentence. Bouali lost his appeal on 7 May 2026, with the court calling his repeated denial "totally unacceptable". One conviction was changed from a count of attempted rape to a count of full rape, increasing his sentence from two years in prison to three years in prison. Bouali's lawyer announced in turn that he would file a motion to quash the ruling with the Supreme Court.

== Discography ==
=== Albums ===
Year	Album	Peak positions	Certification
Year	Album	NED	Certification
2004	Ali B vertelt het leven van de straat	19	
2006	Petje Af	42	
2016	Een klein beetje geluk	7	

=== Singles ===
Year	Single	Peak positions		Album
Year	Single	NED Dutch Top 40	NED Single Top 100	Album
2003	"Waar gaat dit heen?" (with Karima)	Tip 19	57	
2004	"Ik ben je zat" (feat. Brace)	3	2	
2004	"Wat zou je doen" (with Marco Borsato)	1	1	
2005	"Leipe mocro flavour" (feat. Yes-R & Brace)	2	2	
2005	"Wat zullen we drinken (7 dagen lang)" (with Bots)	-	98	
2006	"Rampeneren" (feat. Yes-R & The Partysquad)	4	6	
2006	"Wij houden van Oranje (2006)" (feat. André Hazes )	2	2	
2006	"Zomervibe"	28	50	
2006	"'Till morning" (feat Ziggy)	38	42	
2007	"Dit gaat fout" (feat. Gio)	20	23	
2007	"Je weet zelluf" (with The Opposites)	-	59	
2007	"Groupie love" (feat. Yes-R, Gio & Darryl)	9	3	
2008	"Baas" (with Sjaak)	-	19	
2009	"Me boy" (with Yes-R & Lange Frans)	Tip 11	-	
2011	"Troubadour 2011" (with Kaiser)	-	50	
2011	"Rosamunde 2011" (with Yes-R & Brownie Dutch)	38	7	
2011	"Summertime" (feat. Brace & the Sleepless)	Tip 16	20	
2015	"Terwijl jullie nog bij me zijn" (feat. Ruben Annink)	32	4	
2015	"Wanneer gaan we weer naar huis?" (feat. Glen Faria)	-	57	
2015	"Gekke kleine jongen" (feat. Glen Faria)	-	20	
2017	"Glimp van de duivel" (feat. Nielson)	28	94	
2017	"Ik ga weg" (with Boef)	-	5	
2017	"Voy a Bailar" (feat. Boef, Rolf Sanchez & RedOne)	9	17	
2017	"Obesitas" (with Mula B feat. Dopebwoy)	-	58	
2017	"Paranoia" (with Glades, Mula B feat. Lijpe)	-	-	
2018	"Niet verwacht" (with Lijpe & Ismo)	-	70	
2018	"Bentayga"	Tip 2	-	
2018	"Amsterdam Marrakech" (feat. Ahmed Chawki, Soufiane Eddyani & Brahim Darri)	-	71	
2018	"Dana" (with Cheb Rayan, R3HAB feat. Numidia )	Tip 10	42	
2018	"Meli meli" (with Numidia feat. Ronnie Flex)	Tip 4	6	
2018	"Spectakel" (feat. Boef & Ronnie Flex)	-	55	
2018	"Waar Ben jij Nou" (feat. Jim van der Zee)	-	-	
2019	"Sneaky Money" (featuring Chivv & Boef)	-	18	
2020	"Anderhalf" (featuring Poke and Judeska)	27	5	

Featured in

Year	Single	Peak positions			Album
Year	Single	NED Dutch Top 40	NED Single Top 100	BEL (Fl)	Album
2005	"Hartendief" (Brace feat. Ali B)	7	5	-	
2005	"Het kind" (Brace feat. Ali B & J-Rock)	38	35	-	
2006	"Ghetto (remix)" (Akon feat. Ali B & Yes-R)	3	2	-	
2006	"Hard to Get" (Gio feat. Ali B, Party Squad & Ambush)	Tip 4	41	-	
2006	"De leipe Bauer flavour" (Frans Bauer feat. Ali B & Lange Frans)	-	14	-	
2008	"Eeyeeyo" (Darryl feat. Ali B, Soumia & Rio)	29	10	-	
2013	"Koningslied" (Nationaal Comité Inhuldiging featuring various artists including Ali B)	2	1	41	
2013	"Muziek" (Marco Borsato feat. Bag2Bank & Ali B)	9	1	Tip 8	
2017	"Ego" (Mula B feat. Ali B)	-	77	-	
2017	"Money voor mij" (Kosso feat. Ali B & Boef)	-	74	-	
2018	"Slow down" (Dimitri Vegas & Like Mike x Quintino feat. Boef, Ronnie Flex, Ali B & I Am Aisha)	18	4	-	
2018	"Willie" (Oualid feat. Ali B, MocroManiac & Kippie)	-	80	-	

== Awards and nominations ==
Year	Award	Category
2000	Poetry Slam	
2004	Essent Awards	
2004	Megaward	
2004	Zilveren Harp	
2004	Dutch Urban Award	
2004	Mobo Award	Best Dutch Urban act
2004	Buma Cultuur Pop Award	
2005	Mobo Award	
2005	Kids Choice Award	Best Kaaskop
2005	TMF Awards	Best newcomer
2005	Nightlife Award	
2006	TMF Awards	Best Urban Act
2007	3FM Awards	Best R&B/HipHop Artist
2012	Gouden Televizier-Ring	Best TV program for Ali B op volle toeren (nomination)
2012	Zilveren Televizier-Ster Man	Best male host
