= Yes-R =

Dutch rapper and television presenter

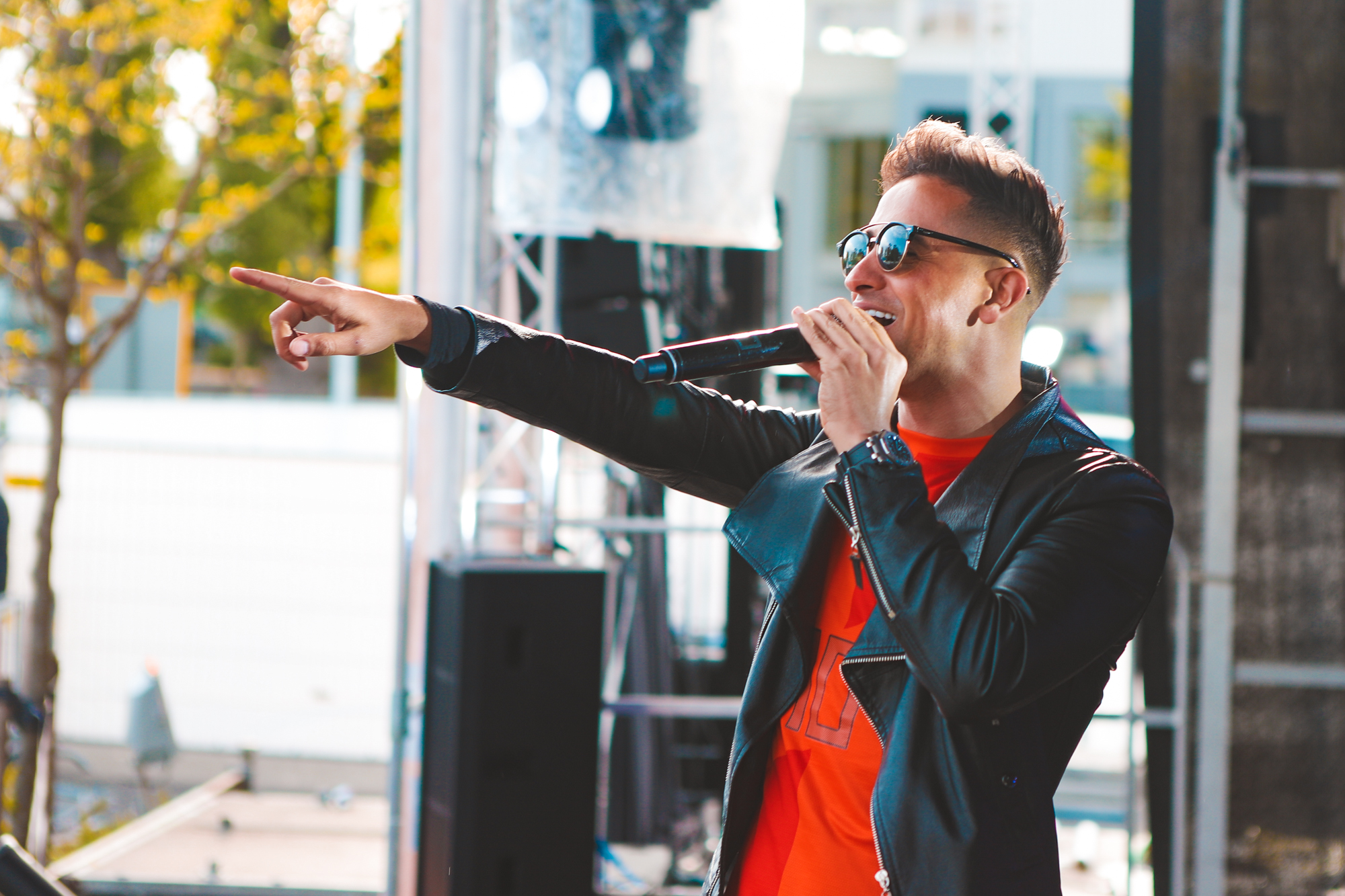
- Yes-R in 2019

Background information
- Born: Yesser Roshdy; 2 November 1986 (age 39)
- Origin: Amsterdam, Netherlands
- Genres: Hip hop; R&B; pop
- Occupations: Rapper; singer; songwriter; presenter
- Instrument: Vocals
- Years active: 2004 – present
- Label: SPEC Entertainment BV
- Website: yes-r.nl

Yesser Roshdy (Egyptian Arabic: ياسر رشدي, [jesəɾ ɾoʃdi]; born 2 November 1986), better known by his stage name Yes-R, is a Dutch rapper, singer and television presenter. He was born in Amsterdam, to an Egyptian father, and a Moroccan mother. Before going solo, he was part of the Dutch hip-hop formation D-Men. He has also appeared in the films 'n Beetje Verliefd and Gangsterboys.

== Early career ==
Yes-R originates from East Amsterdam. Inspired by his cousin Ali B, he started rapping at the age of 12. A year later, he entered a talent show in which he placed second. In 2003, he was introduced to Lange Frans, the frontman of the rap formation D-Men, who was impressed by Yes-R's flow. Lange Frans then took on the production of Yes-R's recordings. The first song Chickiesflasher was an underground hit and became part of the compilation album De gastenlijst. He was also featured on the single Sletje by Baas B as well Maritza's debut single Laat Je Gaan.

In 2004, Yes-R won the audience award of De Grote Prijs van Nederland. He also contributed to the D-Men mixtapes De Straatremixes Deel 2 and De Straatremixes Deel 3.

== Solo career ==
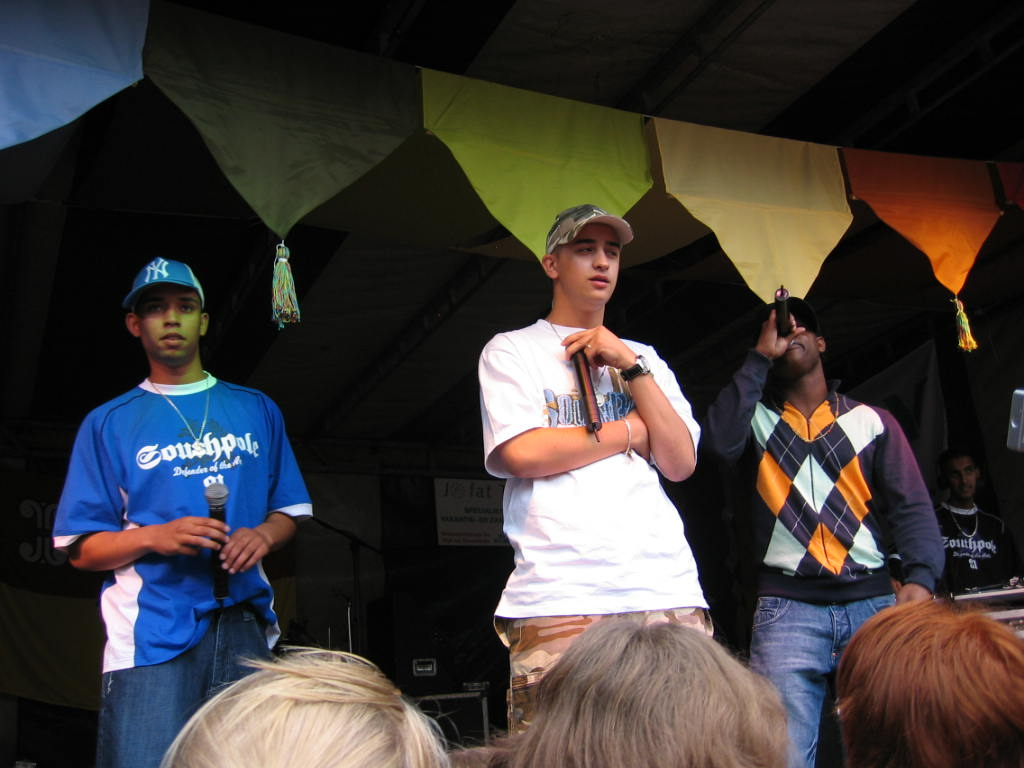
Yes-R with Soesi B, Derenzo and DJ Kesh

Yes-R decided to leave D-Men in 2005 alongside most of its members after disagreements with the D-Men Entertainment record label, and its founding owners, namely rapper Lange Frans and rapper-singer Baas B. He signed instead to his cousin Ali B's record label. Yes-R never discussed the details of the commercial conflict with D-Men, but hinted to it in his song "Het spijt me" ("I'm sorry")

In 2005, his debut solo album Mijn pad ("My Path") was soon released where Yes-R is autobiographical telling his personal story about his life, visions and future prospects. He worked along with Soesi B as a backup vocalist and with Derenzo and DJ Kesh. He also toured throughout the Netherlands to promote his solo career. His concurrent first single with Mijn pad was released in March 2005 called "Stel je voor" featuring Baas B.

But far more notorious for chart success was the Ali B famous track "Leipe mocro flavour" Video on YouTube with Brace and Ali B, "mocro" meaning "person of Moroccan descent". It was released just days before the debut single. The Ali B single took him to No. 2 in Dutch Singles Chart and a No. 3 position in the Mega Top 50.

Yes-R begins has been able to target a broad audience and appears through his DVD releases. He is regularly featured not only on urban-oriented programs, but also makes an effort to take part in children shows and talk shows and has become one of the best selling rapper acts in Netherlands, winning many awards including TMF Award for "Best Newcomer" in 2006. Although Yes-R is successful on the charts, he has been suffering from stream of criticism about his commercialism by some other Dutch hip hop personalities and the Dutch people..

In June 2008, Yes-R had a chart-topping hit in Suriname entitled "Uit Elkaar" ("Breaking Up"). It also had success in the Netherlands, reaching No. 14.

Along with rapper Akon and Ali B, he made a remix of the song "Ghetto" with additional rap verses in Dutch.

In 2009, he had a joint hit with Moroccan rapper Soesi B and Darryl.

== Acting career ==
In 2006, Yes-R made his debut as a TV actor in the role of Omar in the film 'n Beetje Verliefd ("A Little Bit in Love") directed by Martin Koolhoven. The film had its premiere on 14 December 2006.

In 2009, Yes-R made a voiceover role in the animated film Sunshine Barry en de discowormen playing the part of Tito, a bassist in the band, in one of the leading role alongside those of Jim and Sita.

In 2009, he took the role of a Turkish rapper in the film Gangsterboys. The film was released on 18 February 2010.

== In popular culture ==
- Yes-R won the audition for a McDonald's advertising campaign thus getting more recognition with youngsters.
- Yes-R has taken part in public awareness campaign for a safer Netherlands.
- Alongside the Dutch television programme Baantjer character Jurriaan 'Jurre' de Cock tries to teach youngsters that they do have a choice.
- He also had a hit through a joint single "Vecht mee" ("Join the Fight") with Chantal Janzen, a sensitive song about cancer.
- In 2005, he appeared on many children television programs including Kinderen voor Kinderen where he performed the single "Terug naar toen" ("Back to Then").Video on YouTube
- In 2008 Yes-R presented the Nickelodeon program Hihi met Sisi
- On 19 April 2008, he appeared in the Dutch game show Ik hou van Holland
- On 1 March 2008 he presented the Kids Top 20 when the original presenter Monique Smit had problems in her vocal cords.
- Yes-R has appeared on the Dutch television program Jensen! and many other talk shows.
- After the murder of Theo van Gogh Yes-R joined Riza in being featured on Ninthe single in the song "Actueel vandaag" ("News Today"). The single was published as a non-commercial release.
- In 2007 and 2008, he won Hunk of the Year award by Girlz! teen magazine and Hitkrant music. In 2009, he was also shortlisted for a second Hunk of the Year award from Hitkrant.

== Awards ==
Music awards

- 2004: Grote Prijs van Nederland (Grand Orix of Netherlands Music Award)
- 2005: Dutch Dutch Mobo Award for Best Single for "Leipe mocro flavour" jointly with Ali B and Brace
- 2006: TMF Award for best Newcomer
- 2009: TMF Award winning TMF Pure Award

Film awards

- 2007: Golden Film (in Dutch Gouden Film) award for 100,000 viewers for 'n Beetje Verliefd
- 2010: Golden Film (Gouden Film) award for 100,000 viewers for Gangsterboys

== Filmography ==
Feature films

- 2006: 'n Beetje Verliefd as Omar (English title Happy Family)
- 2009: Sunshine Barry en de discowormen as Tito
- 2010: Gangsterboys as Apo, a Turkish rapper
- 2012: Zombibi as Jamal Barachi

== Discography ==
=== Albums ===
Year	Album	Peak positions
Year	Album	NED
2005	Mijn Pad	48
2007	Zakenman	48
2008	Zakenman II	–
2012	Fashion	54
2017	El Pardon	

=== Mixtapes ===
- 2009: Dierentuin

=== Singles ===
Year	Single	Peak chart positions			Album
Year	Single	NED Dutch Top 40	NED Tipparade	NED Single Top 100	Album
2005	"Stel je voor" (feat. Baas B)	37		43	
2005	"Fissa" (feat. Derenzo)	–	2	32	
2005	"Mijn pad"	–	2	31	
2006	"Mammie" (feat. Brace)	27		17	
2006	"'n Beetje verliefd"	17		23	
2007	"Hey Schatje!" (feat. Soesi B)	–	4	75	
2008	"Uit elkaar"	14		14	
2008	"Vecht mee" (feat. Chantal Janzen)	–	14	10	
2009	"Me Boy" (Yes-R – Ali B – Lange Frans)	–	11	–	
2010	"Gangsterboys" (Yes-R – Darryl – Sjaak – Soesi B)	–	14	16	
2011	"Rosamunde 2011" (Ali B, Yes-R & Brownie Dutch)	38		7	
2012	"Heimwee" (Yes-R & Angela)	–	5	31	
2012	"Als er geen morgen was"	–		78	
2012	"Ben je ook voor Nederland? – De geluksvogeltjesdans" (Wolter Kroes, Yes-R & Ernst Daniël Smid)	3		4	
2013	"Bubbels" (feat. Sidney Samson)	–		72	

Featured in

Year	Single	Peak chart positions			Album
Year	Single	NED Dutch Top 40	NED Tipparade	NED Single Top 100	Album
2005	"Leipe Mocro Flavour" (Ali B feat. Brace & Yes-R)	2		2	
2005	"Kan me niet meer schelen" (Eddy Zoëy feat. Yes-R)	–	7	63	
2006	"Ghetto Remix" (Akon feat. Ali B & Yes-R)	3		2	
2006	"Rampeneren" (Ali B feat. Yes-R & The Partysquad)	4		6	
2007	"Groupie Love" (Ali B feat. Yes-R, Gio & Darryl)	9		3	
2008	"Bij je zijn" (Fouradi feat. Yes-R)	–	14	36	
2011	"What A Wonderful World" (Dean Saunders feat. Yes-R)	–	7	7	
2012	"Dirty Minds" (Nils van Zandt feat. Yes-R)	–		76	
