= Maneaux =

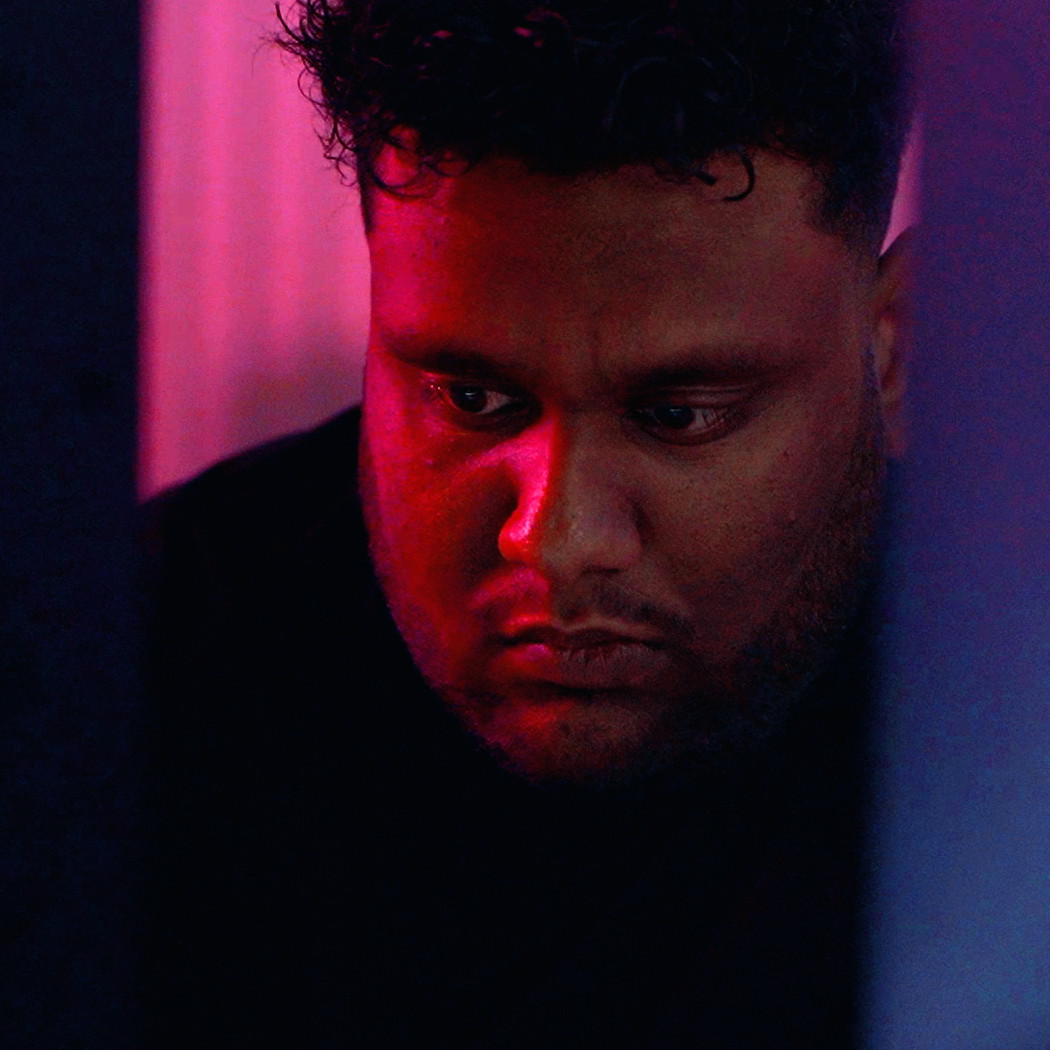

Background information
- Born: Jermano Ashwin van Rabenswaay; 16 May 1998 (age 28); Capelle aan den IJssel, Netherlands
- Genres: Hip hop, Pop, Reggae
- Occupations: Record Producer; Songwriter
- Instruments: Logic Pro; Piano
- Years active: 2010–present
- Label: Sony Music Publishing
- Website: https://maneaux.music

Jermano Ashwin van Rabenswaay (born in Capelle aan den IJssel on May 16, 1998), known professionally as Maneaux, is a Dutch artist and music producer. Maneaux has collaborations with many artists which include: Murda, Yssi SB, OFB (rap group), Sevn Alias, Josylvio, Kempi, Delly Ranx, Anthony B, Re-Play and Tee Set.

== Career ==
In 2020, Van Rabenswaay composed and produced the single Paper Zien (Remix) by Yssi SB. which went #1 Trending in the Netherlands shortly after its release. This resulted in Maneaux receiving his first platinum certification, and the song would eventually win a FunX Music Award in the category of Best video later that year.

In 2021 Maneaux also featured as a judge on a Dutch TV show called RU Open Talent.

== Discography ==
=== Singles ===
Year	Artist	Title	Peak chart positions (NL)		Label
Year	Artist	Title	100	weeks	Label
2020	Yssi SB	Paper Zien	5	30	Quatro Vision
2020	Yssi SB, D-Double, Henkie T, Jack, Sevn Alias & Josylvio	Paper Zien (Remix)	5	30	Quatro Vision
2020	Yssi SB	Freestyle (Un Deux Trois)			Quatro Vision
2020	Kempi & La Baby La Jefa	Bandolien			Kempi College
2020	LePrince, Jay REF, Shabba & Maneaux	Put Away The Guns			Iyah Music
2020	Re-Play	Wereldwonder			Homebase Records
2020	Maneaux & Tee Set	Ma Belle Amie			Pseudonym Records
2021	LePrince, Maneaux, Delly Ranx, Anthony B, Maikal X, La Toya Linger, Jay REF, Shabba, Rawbird & Mr. Fedi	Guns Riddim			Iyah Music
2021	Maneaux, R.Rotjey, Ais, Ella Banks, Nathalie Blue & Shai	Freaky			Ency
2021	Yssi SB & Karma K	Handen Omhoog			Quatro Vision
2022	Murda & Kempi	Banana			Kempi College
2022	OFB (rap group) Dezzie	Nobody Move			One Records
2022	OFB (rap group) Kush	Load Ah Cash			OFB
2025	Henkie T	Badman Stories			Quatro Vision
