= Dutch hip-hop =

Regional music genre

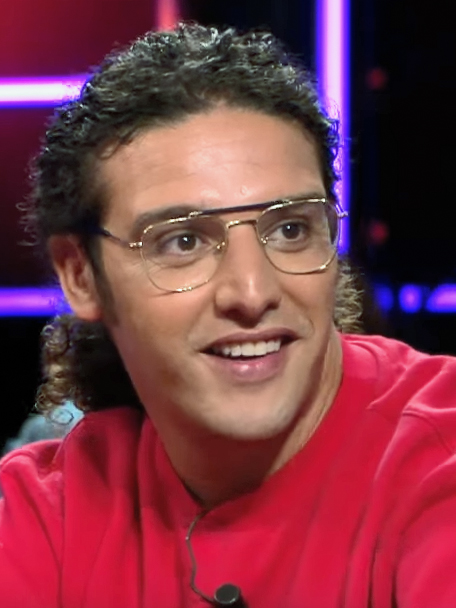
Ali Bouali is perhaps the Netherlands’ best-known rapper, also successful in many other public roles.

Dutch hip-hop or Nederhop ("Netherhop") is hip-hop created by Dutch speaking musicians in the Netherlands and Flanders (Belgium). Although the first Dutch rappers in Europe typically wrote in the English language, this began to change when Osdorp Posse gained a big following of fans. They were the first to record and release hip-hop in the Dutch language, perform for big crowds and to achieve chart success with their albums.

In 1995, the same year Osdorp Posse had a top 20 chart hit with their album Afslag Osdorp, rapper Extince was the first Dutch rap artist to achieve a top 10 hit in the singles charts with Spraakwater.

After rapper Def Rhymz was the first to reach the Dutch main chart with number 1 hits such as Doekoe (Sranan Tongo for 'money'; 1999), and Schudden ("Shake (it)"/"Shaking"; 2001) with a more pop, R&B and dance influenced sound, Dutch language hip-hop has grown into a staple of mainstream pop music in the Netherlands and Flanders in the 21st century.

== History ==
=== 1980s ===
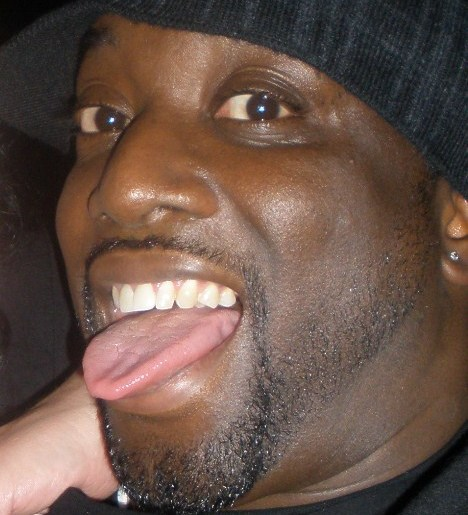
Def Rhymz, of the 1st generation to rap in Dutch, switching in 1986, was the first to achieve number-1 hit singles in the Netherlands main charts with Dutch language hip-hop.

Between 1980 and 1985 a few Dutch Hip Hop records had already been released, but in 1986 Dutch rap duo MC Miker G & DJ Sven had a top 10 hit in at least ten countries across Europe with their Holiday Rap, which sampled Madonna's "Holiday". It caused notable financial disputes, four years ahead of Vanilla Ice's similar sampling troubles with Ice Ice Baby. That same year Dutch rapper Extince released his first record Rap Around The Clock, and in 1987 he scored a modest hit with The Milkshake Rap.

However, in the late 1980s Nederhop ("Netherhop") emerged, as artists began to rap in Dutch, such as Def Rhymz, Blonnie B, Alex and the CityCrew, Dynamic Rockers, and the Osdorp Posse. Though there is disagreement about who were the first, the pioneers' work was at first only experimental, except for the Osdorp Posse, a group from Osdorp, a "hood" in Amsterdam, who were first to release tracks in Dutch, for instance the single Moordenaar ("Murderer") in 1989, marking a beginning milestone of Nederhop. After their frontman, rapper Def P, began by literally translating English raps into Dutch, he started writing original work that still contained peculiar idioms that resulted from his earlier literal rewordings. The result was described by rapper Ali B as highly visual and captivating. Once Extince switched to Dutch in 1994, having rapped in English since 1984, both he and Osdorp Posse became highly influential in Nederhop in the 1990s and beyond.

Notable in the late 1980s were All Star Fresh of King Bee, topping charts with "Back by Dope Demand" in early 1990, and Rudeboy of Urban Dance Squad, who, at the time, were arguably more widely known in New York City than in the Netherlands. DJ and Producer All Star Fresh turned professional as early as 1979. After winning the Dutch Mixing Championships (DMC) in 1988, he was invited to the World Mix Championships in the London Royal Hall and won third place among strong competition. He was invited by Dave Funkenklein to enter the lion's den in New York. He made history in the Big Apple of hip-hop by being the first non-American to fly into the finals of the World Supremacy Battle of DJs. He gained the highly respected second place of this prestigious DJ contest. The impression that he made that year resulted in many invitations to perform with artists like Public Enemy, Stetsasonic, Ice T, and Ultra Magnetic MCs.

All Star Fresh. As performer and producer he is better known as KING BEE. With his second floor filler Back By Dope Demand he achieved one of his biggest hip-hop hits. In the Netherlands, it resulted in a Top 3 position and best Dance Product by The Edison Awards in the Netherlands. (The Edison Awards is an award by the Dutch Music Industry.) This also meant that with this title, he was the first black artist to win this award in the Netherlands. After that, he appeared as a supporting act for Madonna's show in the Netherlands. All Star Fresh kept entering the dance floors. The last titles mentioned were also popular worldwide, selling over 2.4 million copies. He didn't only work within projects like King Bee or Capella, but also was featuring well known production teams like Snap (I Got the Power). This teamwork resulted in the single Lets Get Busy (Clubland Quarts feat Snap introductin [sic] King Bee). This record ended up No. 1 in the Billboard Dance Charts (United States). Other productions in this line were Deepzone "It's Gonna Be All right", Kellee- my love, Ty Holden- you're my Inspiration and His Royal Freshness- They don't understand.

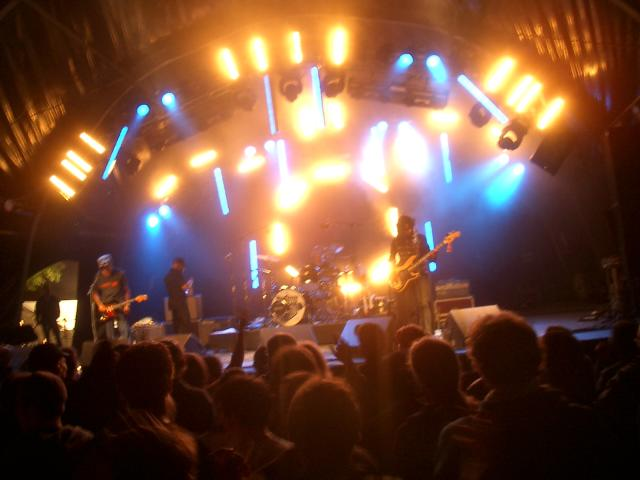
Urban Dance Squad's biggest hit was Deeper Shade of Soul, peaking at 21 on the Billboard Hot 100 in 1991.

=== 1990s ===
Urban Dance Squad was a Dutch rap rock band formed after a jam session at a festival in Utrecht in 1986, including rapper/vocalist Rudeboy Remington and DJ DNA (DoNotAsk). The band's music is described as a blend of genres, including hard rock, funk, soul, hip-hop, reggae, jazz, and ska, and is compared with Living Colour, Red Hot Chili Peppers, and Fishbone. They are still known for their hit single Deeper Shade of Soul, which charted at number 21 in the United States on Billboard Hot 100.

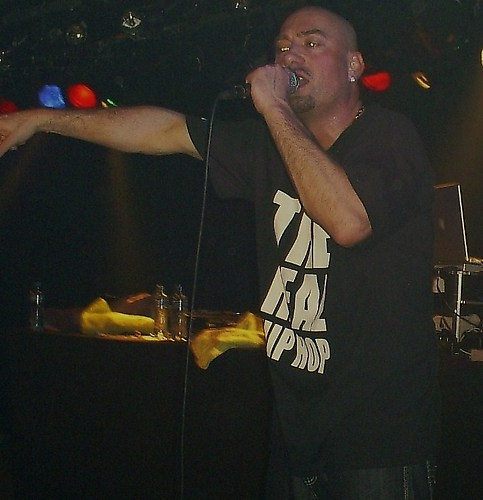
Rapper Extince had the Netherlands' first main chart top-10 single with Spraakwater in 1995.

In 1989, Osdorp Posse formed, the first rap act solely in the Dutch language. They started out translating N.W.A songs to Dutch, but soon began writing their own rhymes. Dutch rap was still frowned upon in general. Many hip-hop listeners found it silly to hear raps in a different language than English, and the radio and television didn't want to have anything to do with it at all.

Osdorp Posse overcame this and gained a small crowd of followers. Indie label Djax Records from Eindhoven picked up on this and signed Osdorp Posse to their label. In 1992, they released their debut album Osdorp Stijl, making it the first ever Dutch language hip hop album. Their beats, created by producer Seda on Amiga 500 with Protracker, had a heavy sound and were similar to U.S. old-school hip-hop, while also embracing their own style by making use of samples from metal music. The lyrics were often focused on social criticism, with frontman Def P describing it as hardcore rap. In Deventer, they found their first following, and the first Dutch-language hip-hop scene was born. The first hip-hop groups after Osdorp Posse were Zuid-Oost Posse and Maasstraat Mannen.

Dutch rap kept on reaching a bigger crowd, though it still could be considered an underground genre. A year after the debut album of Osdorp Posse, they released 2 more albums, Roffer Dan Ooit and Vlijmscherp. Paving the way like this, many Dutch rap acts popped up. In 1994, a breakthrough took place with the release of compilation record De Posse: Nederhop Groeit (meaning "Nederhop is growing"), presenting no less than 7 different new Dutch rap acts on one record. These groups performed all across the Netherlands, gaining an even bigger audience. By 1996, Djax Records released material by Ouderkerk Kaffers, White Wolf, West Klan, Dr. Doom, Spookrijders, Zuid Oost Posse, Klaas Vaak, Cut, Mach, Vuurwerk, Loco-Motief, Lijkenpikkers, Bitchez & Cream, Space Marines, Jesse, Neuk!, and De Uitverkorenen.

The media still largely boycotted Dutch rap, while often expressing criticism on the harsh lyrics and lo-fi beats. Despite this, Osdorp Posse managed to build a large following of fans by 1995, resulting in nationwide sold-out tours and big spots at Dutch festivals. They performed at the Lowlands Festival in 1995, with their popularity getting completely underestimated by the bookers, causing fans to even climb up lightning rigs and poles of the festival tent to be able to experience the set. In 1997, Osdorp Posse did two shows at the biggest festival of the Netherlands, the Pinkpop Festival. On the main day of the festival, they performed at the main stage for a packed field of fans, resulting in the biggest Dutch rap show of the decade.

By that year, the band had 2 albums which charted in the Dutch album charts, while still on an indie label and with virtually no airplay on radio and TV. In 1995 Afslag Osdorp, their fourth album, was the first Dutch language rap album to enter the Album Top 100, for a total of 14 weeks and even a ranking in the top 20. A unique achievement, with a peak position in the charts that would only be matched 7 years later by Brainpower.

By then, the band and Dutch rap in general got taken more seriously as well. After the undeniable success live on stage and in the album charts by Osdorp Posse, the lyrical content was getting cautious praise. By the mid-90's Def P collaborated with renowned and highly esteemed writers like Remco Campert and was often invited to recite his lyrics at poetry rap festivals like the Double Talk Festival at Paradiso.

At the same time, a shift took place when rapper Extince took rap in the Dutch language to a new commercial level and a different audience in 1995. While Osdorp Posse already had big chart successes with their albums, Extince's Spraakwater became the first single to make the mainstream pop single charts in the country. The song even made the top 10 of the singles charts and got airplay on the radio.

From then on, there were two styles dominating the Dutch hip-hop landscape. On one side, the hardcore rap performers like Osdorp Posse, De Uitverkorenen, Casto and West Klan, who focused on the content of their lyrics with social criticism, political subjects and knowledge, on often energetic and rough beats. On the other side, Extince, who was more of a storyteller with a slick flow and a knack for wordplay and metaphoric imagery, on funky and laidback beats.

A mix of these two styles gave birth to the Spookrijders, a three-man hip-hop group founded in 1996. With MCs Stefan and Clyde rapping about their personal lives and life in Amsterdam as a black man, the Spookrijders even gained respect from non-hip-hop musicians and fans. Most people admired the work of producer/DJ Cliff 'the Jazz' Nille after releasing Spookrijders debut album De Echte Shit ("The Real Shit"). In 1999, Spookrijders hit the charts twice with the hits "Klokkenluiders" and "Ik ben de man." Both these songs appeared on the second album, Klokkenluiders van Amsterdam. After some personal arguments among the three crewmembers, Spookrijders split up in 2003, after releasing a third and final album Hey... Spookies!!

In 1999, The Postmen released their rap/reggae mix De Bom ("The Bom"), a top three hit single. They were active across Europe from 1998 to 2003.

=== 2000s ===
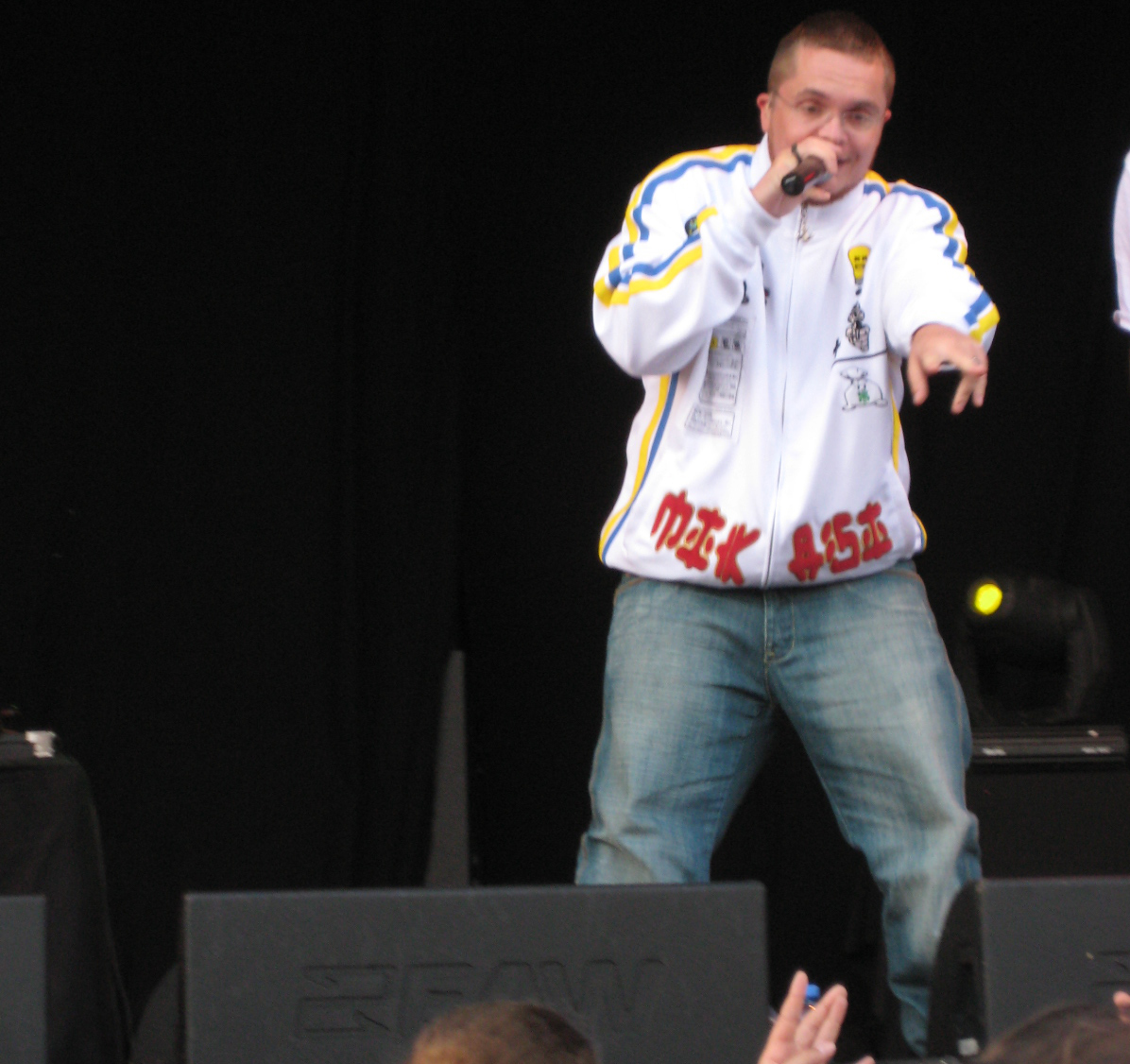
In 2002, Brainpower topped charts with Dansplaat and received both MTV Award and TMF Awards.

From 2000 onward, Dutch language hip-hop grew considerably, both in the number of artists as well as in popularity, both underground and mainstream.

In the early 2000s, the MC fronted band Relax got much airplay, mainly impressing with their albums. Since 2002, they released four albums, the first three of which made the Dutch album top 40.

Def Rhymz, Spookrijders & Brainpower helped develop the art. Def Rhymz & Brainpower dropped multiple hit records. Described by Ali B. as "..a white library boy with glasses..", Brainpower made Dutch rapping accessible to a much greater demographic. With six Top 100 albums, Brainpower is one of the most commercially successful Dutch MC's to date.

By 2000, about 15 years after their founding, Osdorp Posse still sold-out tours and still had big album chart success. They even scored a surprise hit song when Origineel Amsterdams hit the top 10 of the single charts. By then, Dutch rap fully took over from Dutch artists rapping in English, and Osdorp Posse set up their own label to release Dutch rap artists. The same year, they released their seventh album Kernramp as the first double album in Dutch rap, with the second disc containing up-and-coming Dutch rap artists. In the months following its release alone, 17,000 physical copies were sold, unique for Dutch language rap at the time. Having made a permanent mark on their fanbase, when the album was re-released on vinyl in 2019, it became the best-selling album on vinyl the week of release.

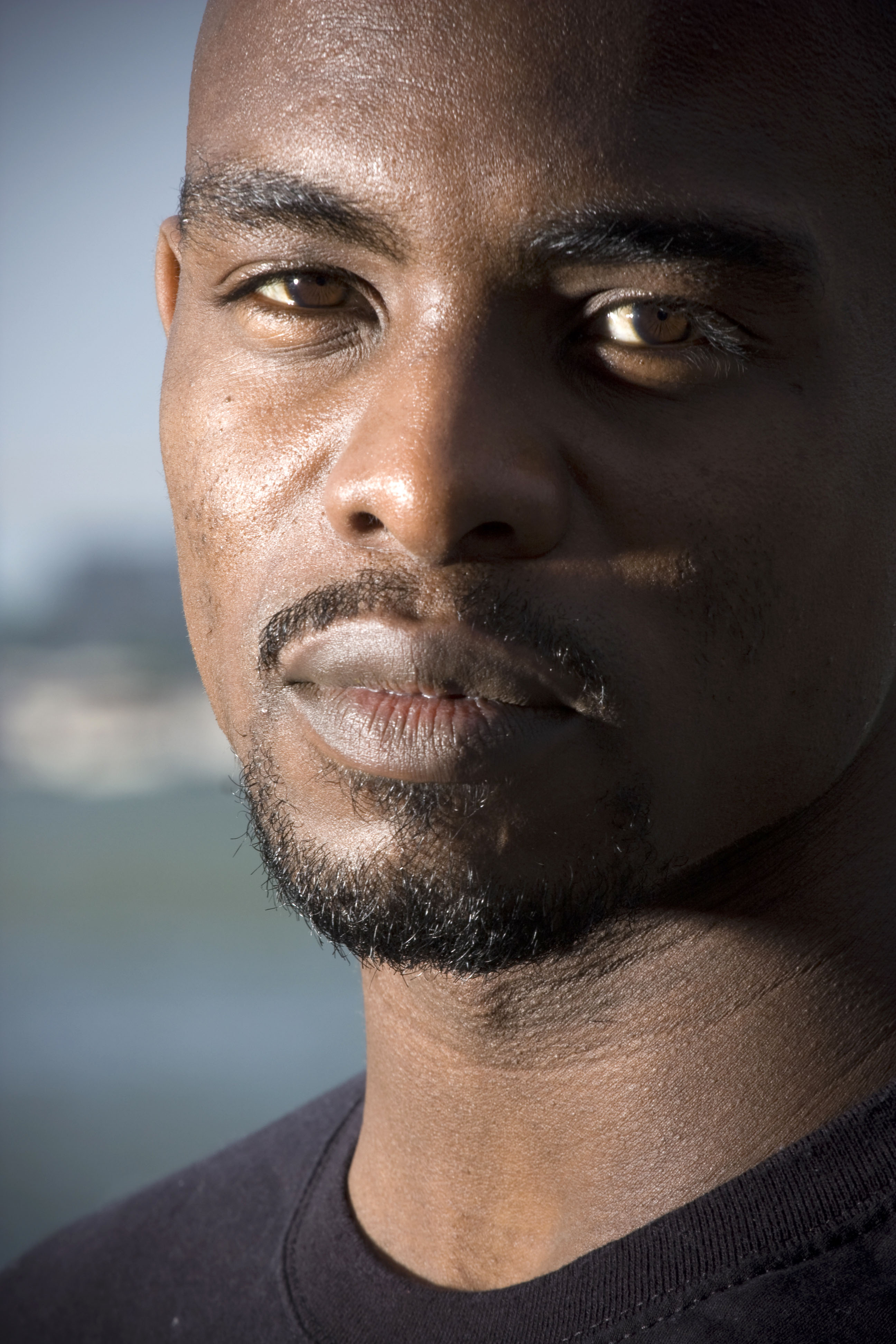
Blaxtar

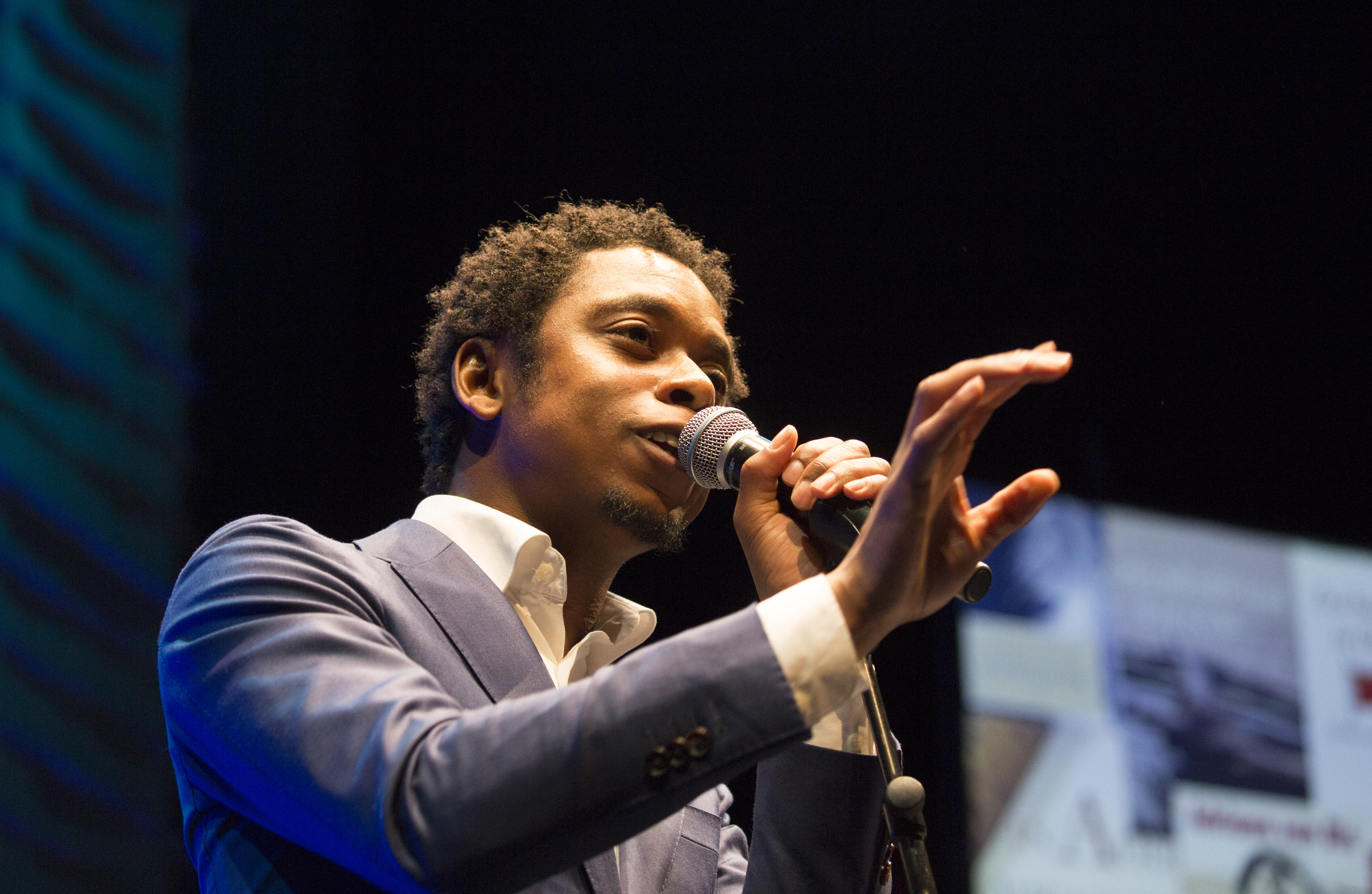
Typhoon, from Zwolle, stems from one of the 'regional' Dutch rappers scenes.

From the late 1990s, a flourishing underground scene in the provincial town Zwolle included rappers Blaxtar, Jawat!, and Kubus, and centered around the group Opgezwolle. Formed in 1998 by rappers Sticky Steez and Phreaco Rico, together with DJ Delic, the band Opgezwolle (punning their town's name into "Swollen"), was a group making raw hip-hop. They released three successful albums in 2001, 2003, and 2006. Eigen Wereld ("Own World"), from 2006, achieved the highest notation of any Dutch-language rap album until then in the Dutch Album Top 100, reaching top 4.

In the same year, rapper Typhoon, also from Zwolle, and inspired by aforementioned peer Blaxtar, released his philosophical debut album Tussen Licht en Lucht ("Between Light and Air"). The successes of the Zwolle rappers' crop boosted other Dutch artists' confidence and inspired them to be proud of their origins – whether local, foreign, or mixed. Rapper Typhoon pointed out that band names of trailblazers like 'Osdorp Posse' and 'Opgezwolle' refer to their origins (Amsterdam Osdorp and Zwolle) for an important reason, and tied this to the shift from rapping in English to Dutch, making it more relatable and resonant with the audience. Instead of hard and angry, some 2000s releases stood out fragile and sensitive, for instance, the single Je moest waarschijnlijk gaan ("I Guess You Had to Go"; 2001) by Brainpower, mourned the loss of his best friend; and the raps of Typhoon are called some of the most poetic.

Opgezwolle split up in 2007, but members Rico & Sticks formed a new group: Fakkelbrigade, with Typhoon, Mick 2dope Murray, MC James and beatmaker A.R.T. In 2009, they released the critically acclaimed album Colucci Era.

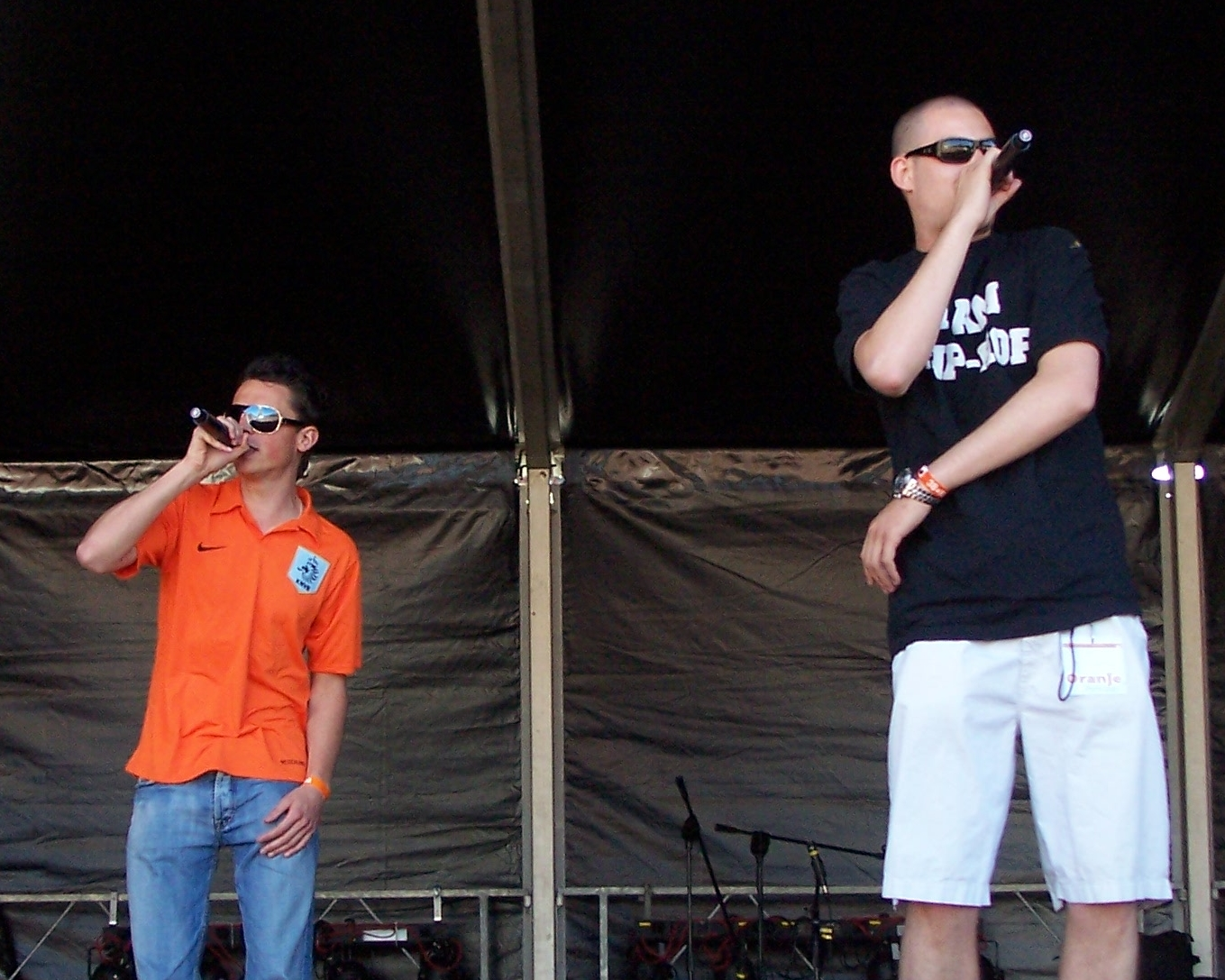
Lange Frans & Baas B had top‑1 hit singles in Holland in 2004 and 2005.

From 2003 through 2006, Lange Frans & Baas B had four top-three hits in the Dutch Top 40, besides three more listings. Zinloos, a sad commentary on senseless violence ("Zinloos Geweld"), and their patriotic yet introspective Het Land van .. ("The Land of..") gave the duo two number-1 hits, in 2004 and 2005 respectively.

In the mid-2000s Cilvaringz, Ali B. Jerome XL and Raymzter were also commercially successful. Ali B featured on other artists' tracks, most significantly with Marco Borsato on the song "Wat zou je doen?" for the charity War Child. He first achieved solo success with "Ik ben je zat", featuring Brace, in 2003. Together with music artist Akon, and Ali's cousin Yes-R, Ali B made an internationally successful remix of Akon's track Ghetto, including additional Dutch lyrics. Yes-R had six Dutch Top 40 hits from 2006 to 2012, including his debut single. Ali B. has sofar had fourteen Top 40 hit singles since 2003, including several top three listings. Jerome XL made a leap to the states in 2006 while recording with many international crews and their members, like Jurassic 5, Dilated Peoples, Juice Crew, and many others. This was a first for Dutch Hip Hop.

In 2005, De Jeugd van Tegenwoordig ("Kids These Days") were successful with Watskeburt?! ("Wuzhappenin?!"). Rapper Jawat won the "Grote Prijs van Nederland" 2006.

Another Dutch hip-hop duo is Pete Philly and Perquisite, who are already well known in the Netherlands, Germany, and Japan.

A famous Dutch rapper outside the Netherlands is Salah Edin. His album Nederlands Grootste Nachtmerrie (Biggest Nightmare of the Netherlands) won Best Album Award in 2007 and was fully produced by Dr. Dre's right-hand man Focus... He also shot three of the most expensive music videos in the history of Dutch Hip Hop, and through a management deal with Cilvaringz, performed in 34 countries worldwide.

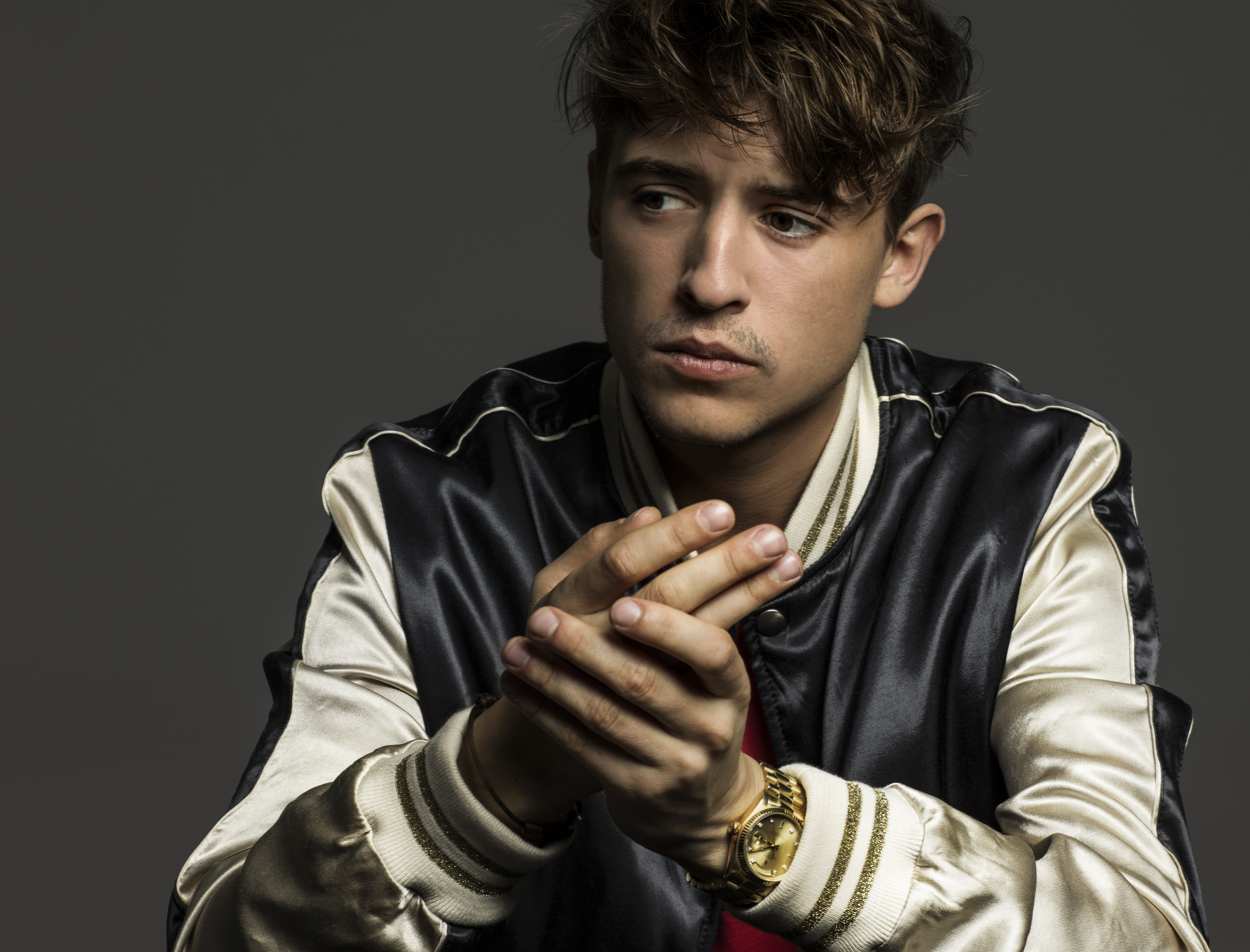
From 2015 to 2020, rapper Lil' Kleine had three straight top-1 albums, out of four that charted for over a year.

=== 2010s ===
Social acceptance of hip-hop in the Netherlands was perhaps epitomized when artist Typhoon performed for the Dutch royal family twice – both in 2013 and in 2016.

In 2015, a self-titled "New Wave" generation of 'social media' (em)powered artists broke through with their eponymous New Wave album, as a temporary collaboration, including Bokoesam, D-Double, Jonna Fraser, Lil' Kleine, Ronnie Flex, and SFB.

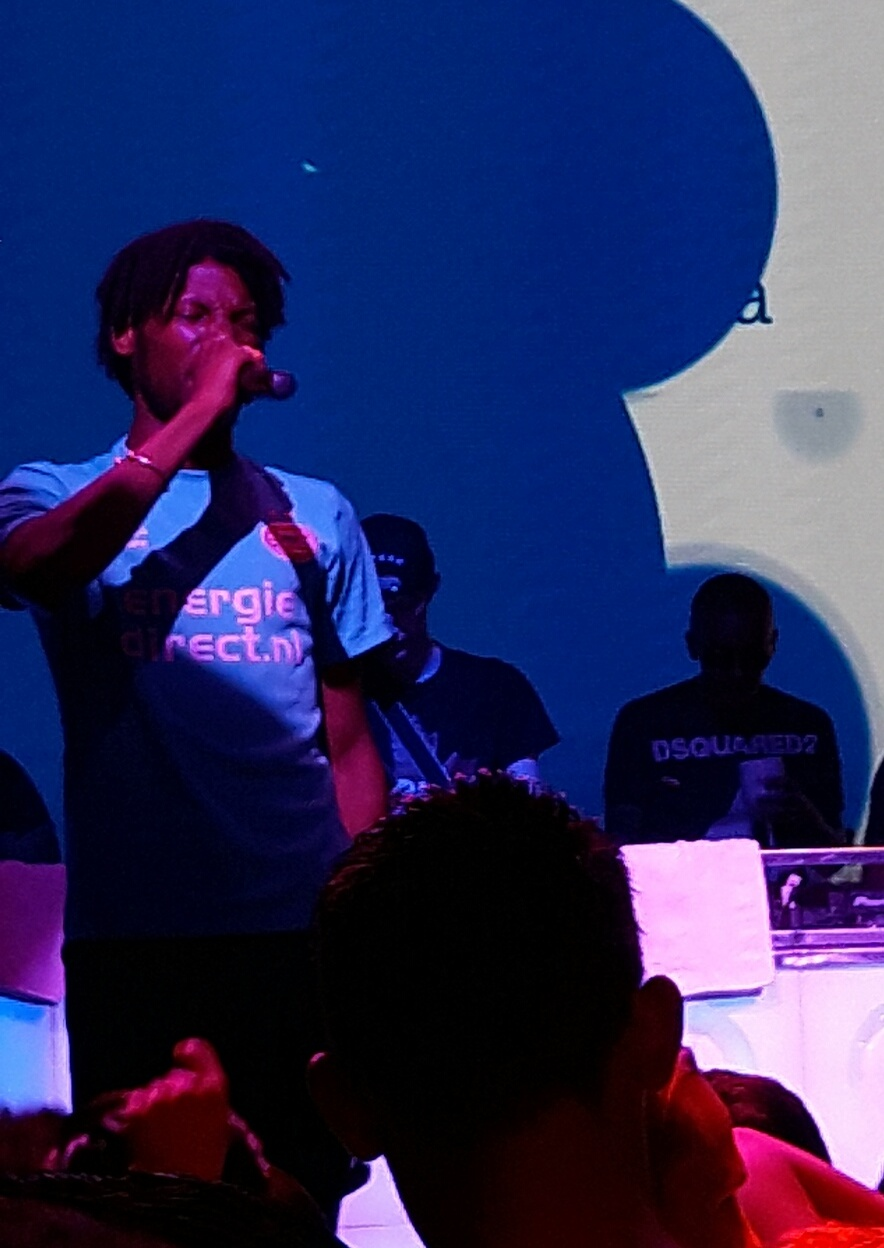
Sevn Alias

Since 2014, rapper group Broederliefde released no less than seven albums, with the "worst one" topping at 13 in the charts — their debut album reached number 3, and their last five albums were consecutive top-2s, with three of them topping the chart. Their third album, Hard Work Pays Off (II) (2016), broke an all-time record by staying at number 1 for 14 weeks, beating a 2003 12-week record, held by Dutch A-list singer Frans Bauer. Nine of their singles also charted in the singles Top 40.

In 2016, the album WOP! by Lil' Kleine was the first hip-hop album to reach number 1 on the Album Top 100. In the same year, Ali B's third album, Een klein beetje geluk ("A Little Bit of Happiness"), proved his best yet, reaching number 7.

Starting in 2016, rapper Sevn Alias released five consecutive top-10 albums, with his second reaching No. 1, and the last three consistently reaching top-2 positions. He is highly productive and is also enjoying extensive success with singles, collaborations, and other track releases.

=== Conflicts ===
The Dutch hip-hop scene also saw many conflicts between rappers, followed by diss tracks. The following were among the biggest Dutch feuds in hip-hop:

Osdorp Posse vs. Extince, BrainPower vs. Extince, T.H.C vs. Negativ, Kempi vs. Nino, Yukkie B vs. Negativ, T.H.C. vs. Lexxxus, Baas B vs. Kimo, Kempi vs. Mini, Kempi vs. Bloedserieus, Heist Rockah vs. Negativ, and Regga vs. Lexxxus.

The feud between T.H.C. and Lexxxus resulted in a fistfight at a hip-hop event, when T.H.C. frontman Rocks got into an argument with Lexxxus and then started the fistfight.

== Genres in Dutch hip-hop ==
=== Gangsta ===
Dutch gangsta hip hop is currently a large scene, together with underground hip-hop. Among the most notable acts and performers are THC, Heinek'n, Keizer, Kempi, Steen, Hef, Crooks, Adonis and Negativ. The rhythms are influenced by the American rap scene, and the lyrics are often about crime, drugs, money, women, and other criminal activities. Often coming from Dutch ghettos, lyrics often include themes occurring in these areas. Dutch gangsta hip-hop mostly comes from the five largest cities: Amsterdam, Rotterdam, The Hague, Utrecht, and Eindhoven.

=== Commercial success ===
The commercial success of Dutch hip-hop is largely made by Brainpower, Yes-R, Ali B, Lange Frans & Baas B, and Extince. For a large part of the Dutch hip-hop community Yes-R, Ali B and Lange Frans & Baas B are sometimes considered fake because they do a lot of work for children's TV stations. Brainpower and Extince however, both enjoy a great respect for bringing up hip-hop in their native Dutch. Other commercial rappers are De Jeugd van Tegenwoordig, and one of the more popular artists in the Netherlands, Partysquad or The Partysquad. They are a 2-man group, having had success with hits such as "Stuk" (Broken), and "Dat is Die Shit" (That's the shit), with other popular songs in the background, such as "Non Stop" ft. Brainpower, "We Gaan Los" (we're going crazy {because of highness or drunkenness}) with Kempi, and "Wat Wil Je Doen" (What do you want to do?).

=== Dutch oldskool ===
The Dutch oldskool exists out of three primary artists, LTH, Osdorp Posse, Extince, Sugacane and Duvelduvel. Osdorp Posse make what they call hardcore rap and use beats that have much in common with N.W.A. Their lyrics are about racism, prostitution, police, and other social subjects. Extince uses very different, more funky kind of beats than Osdorp Posse and uses a completely different rapstyle. Duvelduvel is known as a conceptual hip-hop group.

== Notable artists ==
Notable Dutch hip-hop artists, listed by locality, include:

- Alphen aan den Rijn: Brainpower, Salah Edin
- Alkmaar: Boef, The Opposites
- Almere: Ali B, Josylvio, Raymzter, Jerome XL
- Amsterdam: Sevn Alias, Brainpower, Osdorp Posse, De Jeugd van Tegenwoordig, The Opposites, D-Men, Lange Frans & Baas B, Appa, Yes-R, Tuindorp Hustler Click (THC), Lil' Kleine
- Capelle aan den IJssel: Ronnie Flex
- Deventer: Snelle
- Eindhoven: Fresku, Kempi
- Groningen: Kraantje Pappie
- Nijmegen: Gers Pardoel
- Oosterhout: Extince
- Rotterdam: E-Life, U-Niq, Winne, Feis, Hef, Postmen
- The Hague: Frenna
- Utrecht: Kyteman
- Tilburg: Cilvaringz
- Zoetermeer: Mr. Probz
- Zwolle: Opgezwolle, Typhoon

== See also ==
- European hip-hop
