= U-Niq =

- Born: Anthony C. C. Pengel; July 10, 1976 (age 50); Rotterdam, Netherlands
- Genre: Hip hop
- Occupation: Rapper
- Instrument: Vocals
- Years active: 1989–present
- Label: TopNotch
- Formerly of: The Most Official
- Website: www.top-notch.nl/page/artiest-links/U-Niq/

Anthony Pengel (born July 10, 1976), known professionally as U-Niq, is a Dutch rapper from Rotterdam. He was part of the rap group The Most Official.

Originally interested in football (he was a youth player for Feyenoord), U-Niq began rapping at age 13, influenced by Rakim and Big Daddy Kane. His 1999 debut album Married to Music was released by Sony. While spending some time in jail (he did not disclose why, and says he was acquitted), he decided to rap in Dutch; his first Dutch-language album, Rotterdam, was released by Dutch hip-hop label TopNotch and contained the singles "Rotterdam" and "Klein klein jongetje".

== Discography ==
=== Albums ===
Album title	Release date	Charting in the Dutch Album Top 100			Comments
Album title	Release date	Date of entry	Highest	Weeks	Comments
Married to Music	2000	-			
Rotterdam	2006	15-07-2006	78	1	
Het kapitalisme	2008	08-03-2008	31	2	
Scheepsrecht	2011	16-04-2011	38	1*	

=== Singles ===
Single title	Release date	Charting in the Dutch Top 40			Comments
Single title	Release date	Date of entry	Highest	Weeks	Comments
"I Used to Cry"	1999	-			
"Married to Music"	1999	-			
"Yours Exclusive"	2000	-			
"Wildin' Out"	2001	-			

=== EPs ===
- 2007 Muziek

=== Other ===
- With other artists

Year	Title		Album	
Year	Name	with	Name	Album Artist
1998	"Corrosion"	Postmen & Sonny D	Documents	Postmen
1999	"Hate Me Now"	Nas	Nastradamus (NL versie)	Nas
2001	"Curriculum"	Postmen, Sonny D, Ganza & E-Life	Revival	Postmen
2002	"Chemistry"	E-Life	E=mc²	E-Life
2007	"Coke op 't Gas"	Kempi, Salah Edin, Feis & Winne	Mixtape 3.1	Kempi
2009	"Geef 8 Remix"	Winne, Eddy Ra, Lotto, Crimson, Alex, Alee Rock, Millz & Feis	Winne Zonder Strijd	Winne

- Compilations

Year	Title		Album	
Year	Name	with	Name	Artist/Producer
2000	"Poverty Wisdom"		Social Life - the Album	Social Life
2000	"Zoute Uitval"	Extince, E-Life, The Anonymous Mis, Shyrock & Murth The Man-O-Script	Alle 13 Dope	TopNotch
2007	"Waka Mang" "Het Spel"	-Eddy Ra -Mr Probz, Winne & Eddy Ra	Hard Hard Hard Mixtape	TopNotch
2007	"Klein, Klein Jongetje"	Feis	TopNotch Mixtape	The Flexican - TopNotch
2009	"Straatkennis, Politiek" "Tak Taki"	Royston Drenthe	Extravaganza Mixtape I Extravaganza Mixtape II	TopNotch
2010	"Komt Goed"	Laise	Extravaganza Mixtape V	TopNotch
2012	"Het Legioen"	Winne	-	TopNotch

== Awards and nominations ==
Year	Award	Category	Title	
2006	BNN Urban Awards	Best Lyrics	Klein, Klein Jongetje	Win
2007	BNN Urban Awards	Best Lyrics	Geen Verschil	Nom
2007	Gouden Greep	Hardest Diss Track	Bluffer	Nom
