= Narges Mohammadi (artist) =

Dutch Afghan Artist

Narges Mohammadi is a Dutch-Afghan sculptor based in The Hague.

== Early life and education ==
She pursued her artistic education in The Netherlands, earning a BA in Fine Art (Sculpture) from the Royal Academy of Art, The Hague (2017–2020). Prior to this, she studied Modern and Contemporary Art History at Utrecht University (2014–2018) and Fine Arts at Hogeschool van de Kunsten Utrecht (2015–2017). She also briefly studied Psychology at Utrecht University (2013–2014). She has been represented by Copperfield Gallery in London since 2023.

== Artistic career ==
Mohammadi is known for creating sculpture, installations, and public interventions. Her work features unconventional materials, such as halva, concrete, gum, clay, and soap, which she manipulates through casting, carving, layering, and encasing. By working with large quantities of a single material, she emphasizes its inherent properties to explore weight, texture, and transformation. Her spatial installations balance fragility and solidity, using materiality to evoke both physical presence and emotional resonance.

Her work is rooted in personal and cultural memory, drawing from experiences of childhood, everyday life, and Afghan and Dutch heritage to create sculptural tributes that bridge individual narratives and collective histories. Her approach is informed by anthropology, material studies, and architectural history. She has created public art installations included If You Know, You Know, De Appel, Amsterdam (2024), which was created in collaboration with De Appel's Young Curators Program and LEVS Architecten as a collective artwork co-authored by participating teenagers. She also created Concrete Exchange (2022), two large-scale concrete sculptures of a teacup that is common in Afghan households and its negative space, serving as a platform for community exchange and dialogue on materiality and tradition.

== Major exhibitions ==
- Femicide, Public Monument, Netherlands: A large-scale memorial, commissioned to confront gender-based violence and femicide, serving as a public space for remembrance and activism.
- Attempts for Refuge, Bonniers Konsthall, Stockholm: As part of the group show, That Which Carried Me, Mohammadi will present a sculptural response to the manner in which children seek refuge through play.
- Passing Traces, Museum Ostwall, Dortmund: Featured in the group show, Am Tisch, this work will recreate Mohammadi's award-winning graduation project i.e. a narrow passage-like space constructed from 700 kilograms of halva, symbolizing the ephemerality of life and the traces left behind.
- The Kite That Never Flew, Beelden aan Zee, Scheveningen (2023): A large-scale installation featuring beach toys encased in papier-mâché, symbolizing the lost childhoods of those undertaking perilous sea crossings.
- In the Shadow of the Sun, Hotel Maria Kapel, Hoorn (2023): A solo presentation and residency exploring the impermanence of memory and the inevitability of change, particularly in the context of mourning and the absence of Islamic burial rites in the Netherlands.
- Invisible Hands, Stedelijk Museum, Schiedam (2022): A tribute to home carers in health care, this installation comprises everyday objects made from erasers, highlighting the often unseen labor of domestic workers.

=== Selected group exhibitions ===
- Because You Think It Gives You Hope, part of the duo show, Hastan at Copperfield Gallery, London (2023): In this work, Mohammadi melted her childhood gold earrings, which had accompanied her family on their journey to refuge. They were transformed into coin-like forms, reflecting on themes of migration, adaptation, and the transformation of personal artifacts.
- On an Island, Waterwerken, Buitenplaats Brienenoord, Rotterdam (2022): A multi-sensory dinner program exploring the relationship between water and land, featuring locally sourced, waterless-prepared dishes inspired by texts from various writers and artists.

== Music career ==
Mohammadi, also known by her stage name, Fatima Ferrari, is a DJ. In April 2024, Ferrari performed at the Rewire Festival in The Hague, showcasing her unique blend of cultural influences and musical styles.

== Awards ==
- Volkskrant Visual Arts Prize (2024)
- Charlotte van Pallandt Prize & Stokroos Scholarship (2023)
- Piket Art Prizes (2021)
- Ron Mandos Young Blood Award (2020)
- Stroom Invest Award (2020)
- KABK Bachelor Fine Arts Department Award (2020).

== Collections and acquisitions ==
Narges Mohammadi's works are held in several museum, institutional, and private collections. Notable acquisitions include Het Noordbrabants Museum (2024); the Ministry of Social Affairs and Employment, Netherlands (2023); the Ministry of Health, Welfare and Sport, Netherlands (2023); FENIX Migration Museum, Rotterdam (2023); Stedelijk Museum Schiedam (2023); and Museum Voorlinden, Wassenaar (2021).
