= Winne =

Dutch rapper (born 1978)

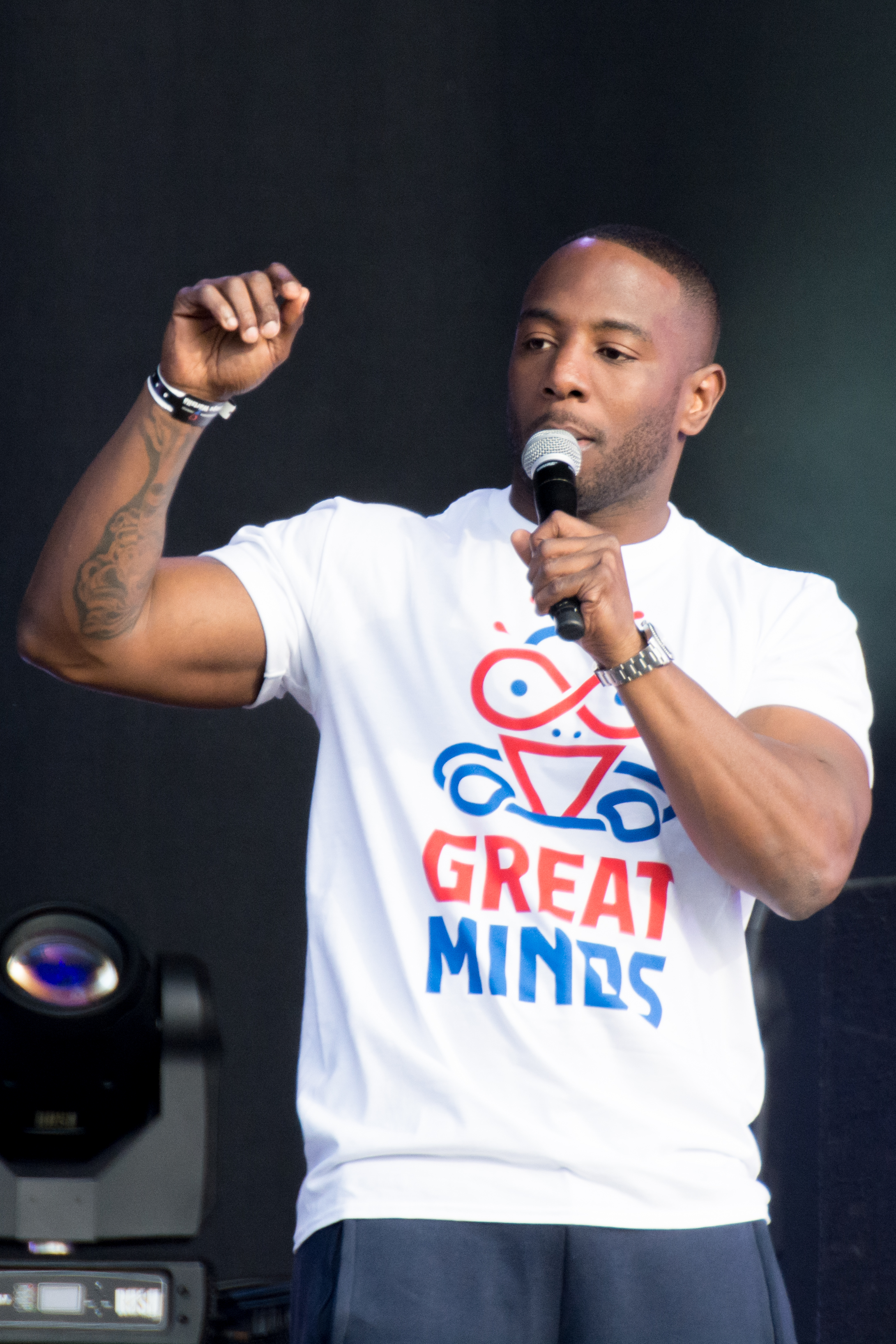
- Winne in 2014

Background information
- Born: Winston Bergwijn; April 20, 1978 (age 48); Paramaribo, Suriname
- Origin: Rotterdam, Netherlands
- Genre: Hip hop
- Occupations: Rapper, label owner, director, entrepreneur
- Years active: 2005–present
- Labels: Top Notch, Couture 33
- Website: https://www.winne.world/

Winston Bergwijn (born 20 April 1978) is a Dutch rapper, label owner, director, entrepreneur, and cultural ambassador, recognized for his influential role in the Dutch hip-hop scene. Renowned for his distinctive style, introspective lyrics, and community focus, Winne has been a prominent figure in Dutch hip hop since the mid-2000s.

== Early life ==
Winne was born in Paramaribo, Suriname, and moved to Rotterdam, Netherlands, at a young age. He began rapping in English under the name Static, later switching to Dutch at the encouragement of friends. He performed with the group D.C.O. at various venues in Rotterdam.

== Career ==
=== Breakthrough and rise ===
Winne gained national attention in 2005 with the track "Top 3 MC," produced by Kapitein Mo and widely circulated online. He further established his reputation with "Pomp Die Shit!" on the compilation album What's da Flavor?! and collaborated with artists such as Opgezwolle and U-Niq. In 2006, he signed with the label Top Notch.

== Solo projects ==
His debut EP, Onoverwinnelijk ("Invincible"), was released in 2007 and included tracks like "Top 3 MC", "Pomp Die Shit!" and "Begrijp me niet verkeerd". The music video for "Begrijp me niet verkeerd" won the State Award for Best Video in 2008.

In 2009, Winne released his first full-length album, Winne Zonder Strijd, featuring the singles "W.I.N.N.E.", "Alles Wat Ik Wil" (with GMB), and "Lotgenoot".

In 2018, Winne released his second studio album, Oprecht Door Zee.

In 2025, Winne released the highly personal album Mssyeh under Couture 33. The project is an ode to friendship and is dedicated to the late rapper Feis, one of Winne's closest friends.

== Mixtapes ==
In 2009, Winne collaborated with Patta on the mixtape So So Lobi, a project that celebrated the Rotterdam hip hop community and featured a range of guest artists.

A second mixtape, So So Lobi 2, was released with Patta in 2020. All proceeds from So So Lobi 2 were donated to The Black Archives and Kick Out Zwarte Piet, supporting anti-racism and Black heritage initiatives in the Netherlands.

== Couture 33 ==
Winne is the founder and owner of the independent label Couture 33, established in 2017. The label has signed artists including Melissa Lopes, Harry Femer, and Raw Roets.

== Theatre ==
=== Angry Young Men ===
Angry Young Men is a theatre production co-directed by Winne and the Rotterdam-based collective Wat We Do. The play premiered at Theater Zuidplein and toured the Netherlands. Angry Young Men blends hip hop, spoken word, and theatre to tell the story of two young men from Rotterdam who find themselves on opposite sides of the law. Through the perspectives of their mothers, the play explores themes of masculinity, choices, loss, and the struggle for a better future. The performance is noted for its raw energy, musicality, and honest portrayal of the challenges faced by young people in urban environments.

=== KINGS...come home ===
KINGS...come home is a theatre production co-directed by Winne and Ira Kip. The play was performed in the Netherlands and had its international debut at The Apollo Stages at The Victoria Theater in Harlem, New York, in 2025. KINGS...come home follows the journey of a family searching for a new home after being uprooted. The story addresses migration, resilience, and the ongoing impact of colonial history and institutional racism. The production is praised for its poignant narrative, cross-cultural cast, and its exploration of identity, belonging, and the meaning of home.

== Personal life ==
Winne resides in Rotterdam. He shared a close friendship with rapper Feis, performing together for fifteen years. After the first part of the Oprecht Door Zee tour, Feis was tragically murdered, which had an enormous impact on his life. In 2024, Winne donated a kidney to his childhood friend Alee Rock.

== Business endeavors ==
- Couture 33: Founded in 2017 by Winne, Couture 33 is his independent label and creative platform, signing artists such as Melissa Lopes, Harry Femer, and Raw Roets.
- Vondelgym Rotterdam: In 2021, Winne opened the Rotterdam branch of Vondelgym together with Arie Boomsma, where he is co-owner and community is central.

== Endorsements and partnerships ==
- That One Word - Feyenoord: In 2021, Winne served as the narrator for the Dutch documentary series That One Word - Feyenoord (Dat ene woord - Feyenoord), released on Disney+, which chronicles the football club Feyenoord during the 2020-21 season.
- Bowers & Wilkins: Winne collaborated with Bowers & Wilkins in the context of his album Mssyeh, highlighting his commitment to sound quality and innovation.
- Fenix Migration Museum: Winne serves as an ambassador for Fenix, the new Rotterdam museum dedicated to migration stories and cultural diversity.
- ASN Bank: Winne is the new voice for ASN Bank, lending his recognizable sound to the bank's campaigns and branding.

== 101Barz session ==
Winne has appeared three times on the Dutch hip hop platform 101Barz:

- In 2009, Winne and Feis recorded a studio session for 101Barz.
- In 2011, Winne and Feis returned for a second joint 101Barz studio session.
- In 2015, following the release of So So Lobi II, Winne appeared for a 101Barz studiosessie with the So So Lobi II collective.

== Chart performance and rankings ==
- In 2009, Winne reached #1 in the FunX charts with "W.I.N.N.E.".
- In 2013, as part of Great Minds, he achieved a #2 entry in the Album Top 100 with the album Great Minds.
- In 2014, "Superman" by Winne reached #1 in the FunX charts.
- In 2015, the track "Mooie Val" with Appa reached #1 in the FunX charts.
- In 2018, his album Oprecht Door Zee entered the Album Top 100 at #3.

== Musical style and influences ==
Winne’s artistry is deeply inspired by nineties hip hop and hip hop icons Nas, Jay-Z and Nipsey Hussle. Like his influences, Winne is known for his narrative-driven, reflective lyrics and his focus on authenticity and social consciousness.

=== Style and sound ===
- Lyrical themes: Winne’s work is characterized by introspection, honesty, and storytelling. He often addresses themes such as personal growth, resilience, friendship, social justice, and the black experience.
- Sound: His music blends classic hip hop beats with modern production, featuring soulful samples, melodic hooks, and a laid-back yet impactful flow. His delivery is clear and deliberate, prioritizing message and emotion.
- Artistic approach: Winne is praised for his attention to detail and commitment to artistic integrity, curating his visual and musical output to create a cohesive narrative experience.

== Achievements ==
- State Award for Best Video (2008) for "Begrijp me niet verkeerd"
- Winne Zonder Strijd wins Best Album at the State Awards 2009.
- Best Artist at the State Awards 2009.
- Best 101 Barz session at the State Awards 2009.
- Laurenspenning 2025 for cultural contributions to Rotterdam (to be awarded in October 2025)

== Discography ==
Year	Title	Type	Label
2007	Onoverwinnelijk	EP	Top Notch
2009	Winne zonder strijd	Studio Album	Top Notch
2009	So So Lobi (with Patta)	Mixtape	Top Notch
2018	Oprecht Door Zee	Studio Album	Top Notch
2020	So So Lobi 2 (with Patta)	Mixtape	Top Notch
2025	Mssyeh	Studio Album	Couture 33
