= Het land van... =

"Het Land Van..."

Single by Lange Frans & Baas B
- Released: 2005
- Genre: Dutch hip hop
- Length: 4:00
- Label: Walboomers Music
- Songwriters: Frans Frederiks Bart Zeilstra & Giorgio Tuinfort

Lange Frans & Baas B singles chronology
"Supervisie" (2004)	"Het Land Van..." (2005)	"Mee naar Diemen-Zuid" (2005)

"Het land van..." ("The country of...") is a Dutch song by Lange Frans & Baas B. The lyrics of this song discuss past and present social and political issues in the Netherlands. It rose to the top of the Dutch charts soon after its release in 2005, with a live performance during the Uitmarkt on August 26 at the Museumplein, Amsterdam.

== Lyrics ==
The lyrics enumerate the best and worst parts of Dutch history, in the form "[The Netherlands] are the country of..." ("Het Land Van..."), often listing a good and bad part in the same line. In the song, Lange Frans and Baas B elaborate that the Netherlands are the country of ("het land van") Pim Fortuyn and Theo Van Gogh as well as of their murderers Volkert van der Graaf and Mohammed Bouyeri.

Other subjects related to the Netherlands named in the song include:

- Great marijuana and XTC consumption as well as legalised prostitution
- popular fastfood
- great soccer players like Johan Cruijff and Abe Lenstra, but also of bloody feuds between Ajax and Feyenoord (see Klassieker for details)
- rivalry between different clubs, but when the national team is playing, everybody watches together like one big family
- vicious plunderers (colonisation of e.g. Indonesia) and inventors of the word apartheid, but also a land which was liberated from Nazi Germany in 1945
- many regional dialects in a small area, rich culture, but also great problems with immigration and social problems in housing projects
- high taxes and a society filled with envy of those who make it big
- Prime Minister Jan Peter Balkenende, who supports the Iraq War as a "puppet of George W. Bush"
- great folk musicians like André Hazes, who still are popular in the Netherlands

In the end, both rappers state that despite all the faults, they love their country.

== New versions ==
In 2019, Lange Frans & Baas B reunited in order to create a new version of the song, called "Het Land Van Vriendschap", featuring the same melody as the original but with actualized themes including the murder of Anne Faber and the downing of Malaysia Airlines Flight 17.

A political version of the song (with piano played by Thierry Baudet) was performed by Lange Frans at the party congress of Forum for Democracy, a right-wing party in the Netherlands.
