= Feis (rapper) =

Dutch rapper (1986–2019)

Background information
- Born: Faisal Mssyeh; 25 January 1986; Rotterdam, Netherlands
- Died: 1 January 2019 (aged 32) Rotterdam, Netherlands
- Genre: Hip-hop
- Occupations: Rapper; singer; songwriter
- Instrument: Vocals
- Years active: 2007–2019

Faisal Mssyeh (Arabic: فيصل مسيح, born January 25, 1986 – 1 January 2019), known professionally as Feis, was a Dutch rapper of Moroccan origins. He was a member of the Rotterdam rappers' crew Ecktuh Ecktuh.

== Career ==
Feis gained some fame in 2007 when he worked on the song "Klein, Klein Jongetje" by U-Niq. In the same year he was heard on the song "Coke op 't Gas" by Kempi. In 2009, he contributed to the album Winne zonder strijd by Winne.

In 2014, Feis released his debut album Hard van Buiten, Gebroken van Binnen. In 2015, he was at the festival Eurosonic Noorderslag and in the same year he was seen with Maribelle in an episode of Ali B op volle Toeren.

On 1 January 2019, Feis was fatally shot in Rotterdam on the Nieuwe Binnenweg. The seven suspects have been arrested: four men aged around 36 to 45, two women aged between 32 and 59, and a 15-year-old girl.

== Discography ==
- Dagelijkse Sleur EP (2015)
- Hard van buiten, Gebroken van binnen (2014)
- Gebouwd voor dit EP (2014)

== See also ==
- List of murdered hip hop musicians
