= XITE =

Interactive music video platform

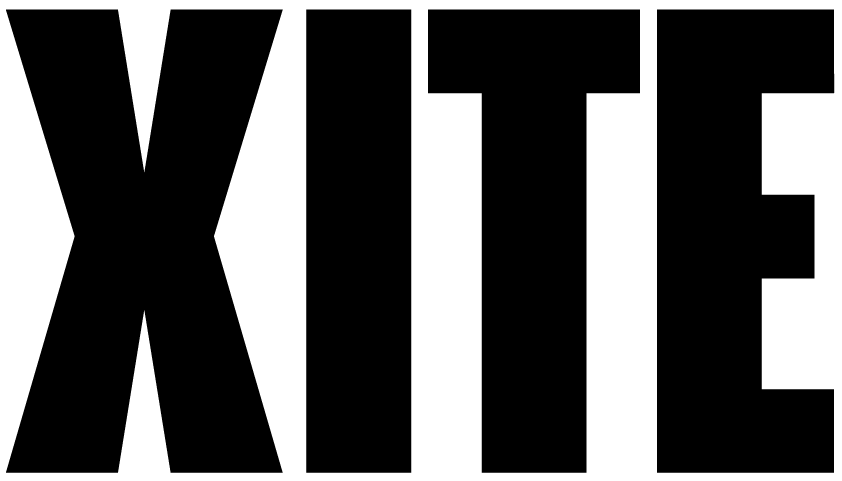
- Country: Netherlands
- Broadcast area: Netherlands; Belgium; Germany; U.S. Canada; United Kingdom; Ireland
- Headquarters: Amsterdam, Netherlands

Programming
- Picture format: 4K UHD; 1080i HDTV (downscaled to 16:9 576i for the SDTV feed)

Ownership
- Owner: Derk Nijssen

History
- Launched: 21 May 2008; 18 years ago

Links
- Website: www.xite.com

Availability

Terrestrial
- Digitenne (Netherlands): Channel 27 (HD)

Streaming media
- Livestream: Watch Live
- Ziggo GO (Netherlands): ZiggoGO.TV

XITE (pronounced "excite") is a Dutch interactive music video platform founded in the Netherlands. The service operates linear and interactive television networks, and on-demand streaming services.

XITE-branded services are currently available in the Netherlands, Belgium, Germany, the U.S., Canada, the United Kingdom and Ireland. In the U.S., Xite is available via Amazon Fire TV, Apple TV and Roku; as well as Comcast Xfinity and some Samsung TVs. Since December 2015, XITE's interactive TV app has been available on Ziggo in the Netherlands, and Ooredoo in Qatar.

== History ==
XITE was founded by entrepreneur Derk Nijssen in the late aughts. The company invested in the channel by technology start-up fund Henq Innovation Fund 1, United Broadcast Facilities (UBF) and Rebel Technologies (a joint venture between UBF and XITE for interactive applications in video on-demand). Base7 was used as the working name for the start of the Base7 transmitter. The home base was initially located in Rotterdam.

The station started broadcasting in 2008 via the digital packages from UPC and Caiway. At UPC, XITE replaced Paramount's canceled music channel TMF Nederland. As with the canceled music channel The Box, viewers could request video clips by phone (0900 number or text message) by means of a clip code. In September 2009, XITE came up with an on-demand system via the red button on the remote control. Since then, the viewer has been able to request clips in this way and he has been able to compile playlists by genre and view specials and interviews.

In February 2011, XITE started broadcasting in Belgium via the basic package of Telenet. XITE started broadcasting in Germany in September 2014. In 2016, the Personalized Music Television service was launched via Ooredoo in Qatar. In the same year, a 4K channel was offered via KPN, where music videos were shown in Ultra-HD. From May 2017, XITE 4K is also available in Canada.

== Xite Music ==
On 1 April 2019, Xite launched a digital music pay radio service on Ziggo in the Netherlands. It is a service that broadcast continuous streaming music and other forms of audio on multiple channel feeds. Xite Music replaced Stingray Music on Ziggo.

=== Linear channels ===
- Mini Disco
- Teen Party
- Piratenplaten (Dutch pop music)
- In De Kroeg (English: In the Pub)
- POP NL
- Schlagerfest (German Schlager)
- XITE Hits
- Muziek Van Nu (English: Contemporary Music)
- Zeroes Heroes
- Back 2 The 90s
- 80s Flashback
- 60s & 70s Fever
- Gouwe Ouwe (English: Golden Oldies)
- Thuisorkest (English: Orchestra at Home)
- Yoga Flow
- Op De Koffie (English: Coming over for Coffee)
- Pure Focus
- Mellow Beats
- Take It Easy
- Jazzy Dinner
- LOVE.
- Voel Je Goed (English: Feeling Good)
- Sing-Along
- Huisfeestje (English: Party at Home)
- All Out Dance
- Workout!
- Reggae Feels
- Siempre Latino
- Country Roads
- Twist Again
- Rock Legends
- Rock On
- Kneiterhard (Hardstyle)
- Indie Wave
- Sit Back & Jazz
- Soul Baby
- Straattaal (English: Street Language, Dutch hip hop)
- Urban Vibes
- Variable
- Ziggo Dome

== Programmes ==
XITE mainly broadcasts music video clips, sometimes following a particular genre or theme. XITE also devotes attention to music-related topics, along with interviews, club and festival reports.

Year(s)	Programma	Presentation
2013 – 2020	Week Mix & Yearmixes	James Eussen (Avanti Media Group)
2016	XITE Festival Reports	–
2016	XITE Zoekt Vlogger	–
2015	XITE Festival Reports	VJ Femke
2015	XITE Zoekt VJ	Sol Wortelboer
2014	Hip Hop NL	Jorik Scholten (Lil' Kleine)
2014	Festival Reports	Salma Chafouk Idrissi
2014	The Nominees	Ingrid Jansen
2013–2014	Daily Noise	Sol Wortelboer (ma-woe) & Ingrid Jansen (don-vrij)
2013	On Tour	Gwen van Poorten
2013	Clubtour	Gwen van Poorten
2013–2014	Ziggo Top 20	Sol Wortelboer
2011–2012	Hi5	Lara Hoogstraten (2011) and Celine Bernaerts (2012)
2011	Xite Specials	All VJs

=== XITE Awards ===
Since 2013, XITE has been organising the XITE Awards every year. In addition to performances, awards are presented during the show for both best and most popular songs, artists, upcoming talent and an award for best music video of the year.

=== Past and current presenters ===
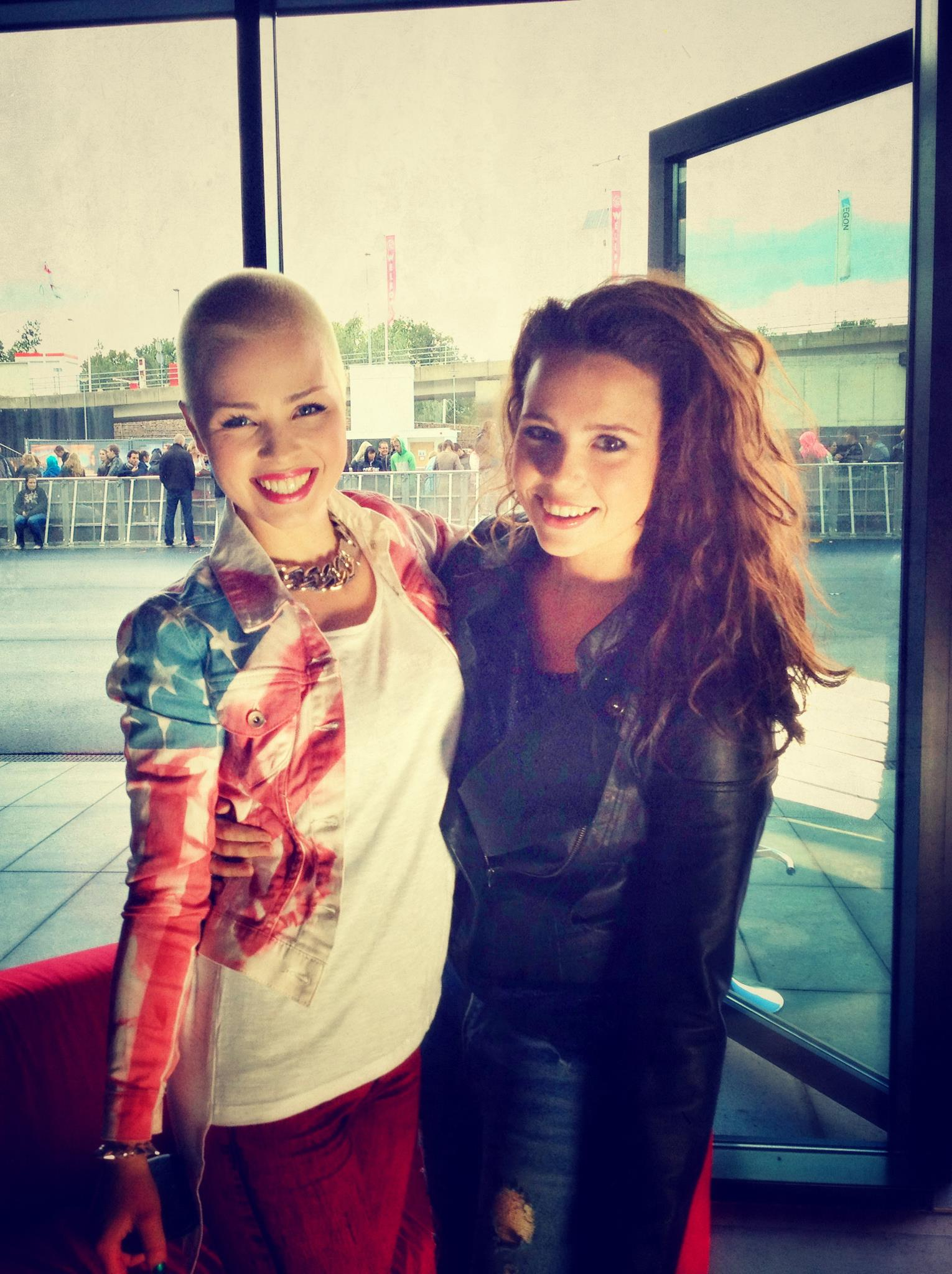
Celine Bernaerts and Gwen van Poorten (2012)

- Iris Enthoven (2016 – current)
- Boris Lange (2014 – current)
- Ingrid Jansen (2014 – current)
- Femke van Leeuwen (2015–2016)
- Jorik Scholten (2014)
- Salma Chafouk Idrissi (2014)
- Sol Wortelboer (2013–2015)
- Sjaak P. van Es (2013)
- Gwen van Poorten (2012–2013)
- Celine Bernaerts (2011–2012)
- Alain Keeven (2011–2012)
- Sanne Bolten (2011)
- Lara Hoogstraten (2011)

== Logos ==
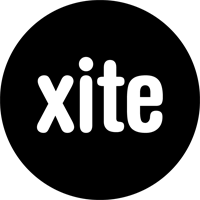
2008–2013

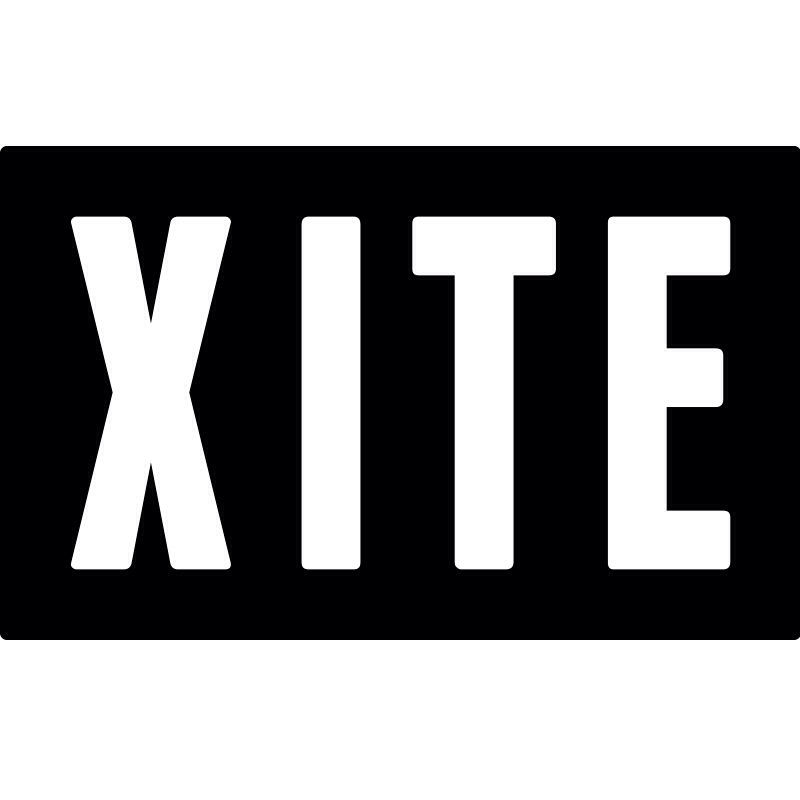
2013–2017

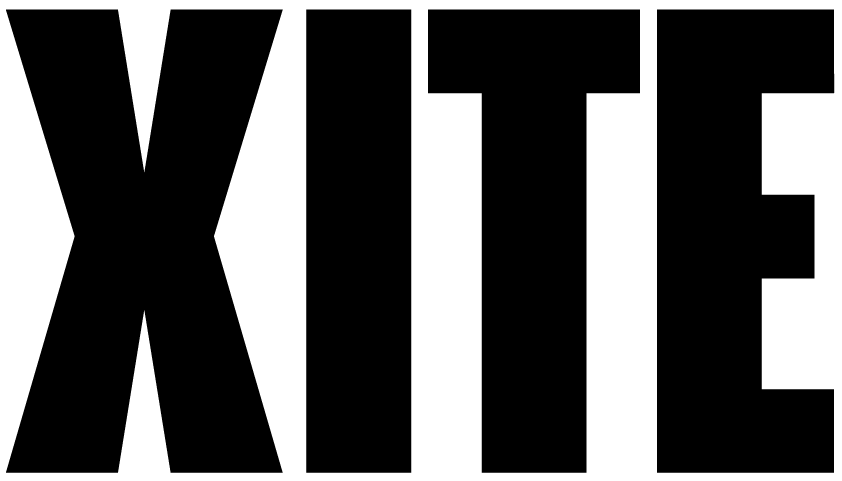
2017–present
