= Appa (rapper) =

Dutch rapper (born 1983)

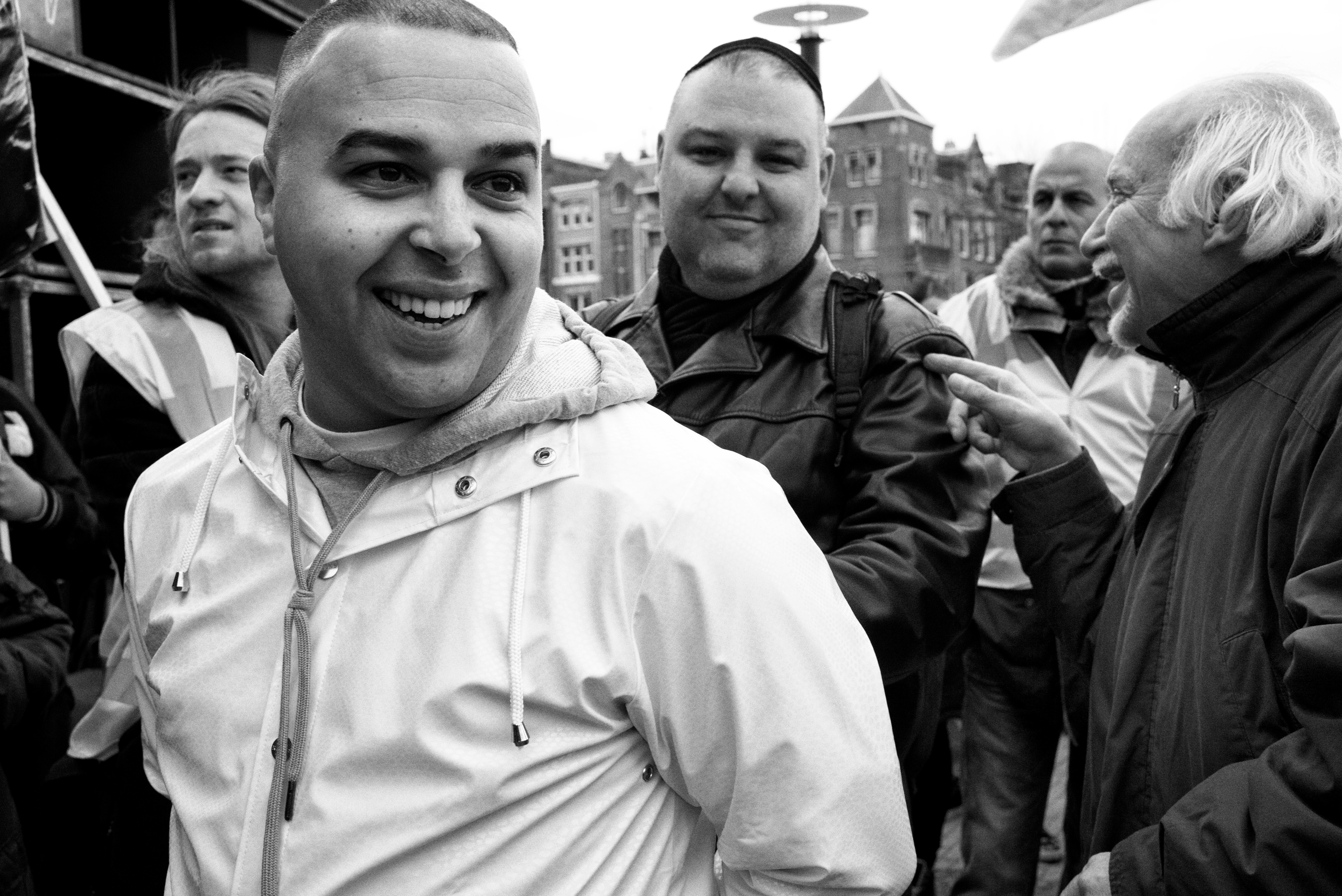
- Appa (2015)

Background information
- Born: Rachid El Ghazoui; 27 January 1983 (age 43); Amsterdam, Netherlands
- Genre: Hip hop
- Occupation: Rapper
- Years active: 2002–present
- Label: Appa Productions
- Formerly of: Tuindorp Hustler Click

Rachid El Ghazoui (born 27 January 1983), also known by his stage name Appa, is a Dutch rapper of Moroccan descent.

== Career ==
In 2002, he joined rap formation Tuindorp Hustler Click (THC), but decided to go solo. He is known for the political content of his lyrics and criticism of nationalist MP Geert Wilders. He also strongly identifies with the social problems of Moroccan youths. In November 2007, his first album called Straatfilosoof (Street Philosopher) appeared. In an interview he calls the album "autobiographical" and a "user guide for the people who don't understand us (Moroccan youths)".

In 2026, Appa was sentenced to 40 hours of community service following a case in which he doxed a Dutch-Israeli woman, her mother, and a journalist who reported on the case.

== Discography ==
Albums

- Straatfilosoof (Street Philosopher) (2007)

Mixtapes

- De Meest Onderschatte (The Most Underestimated) (2006)
- TBS: Ter Beschikking van de Staat (At the Disposal of the State) (2007)
