= Josylvio =

Dutch rapper (born 1992)

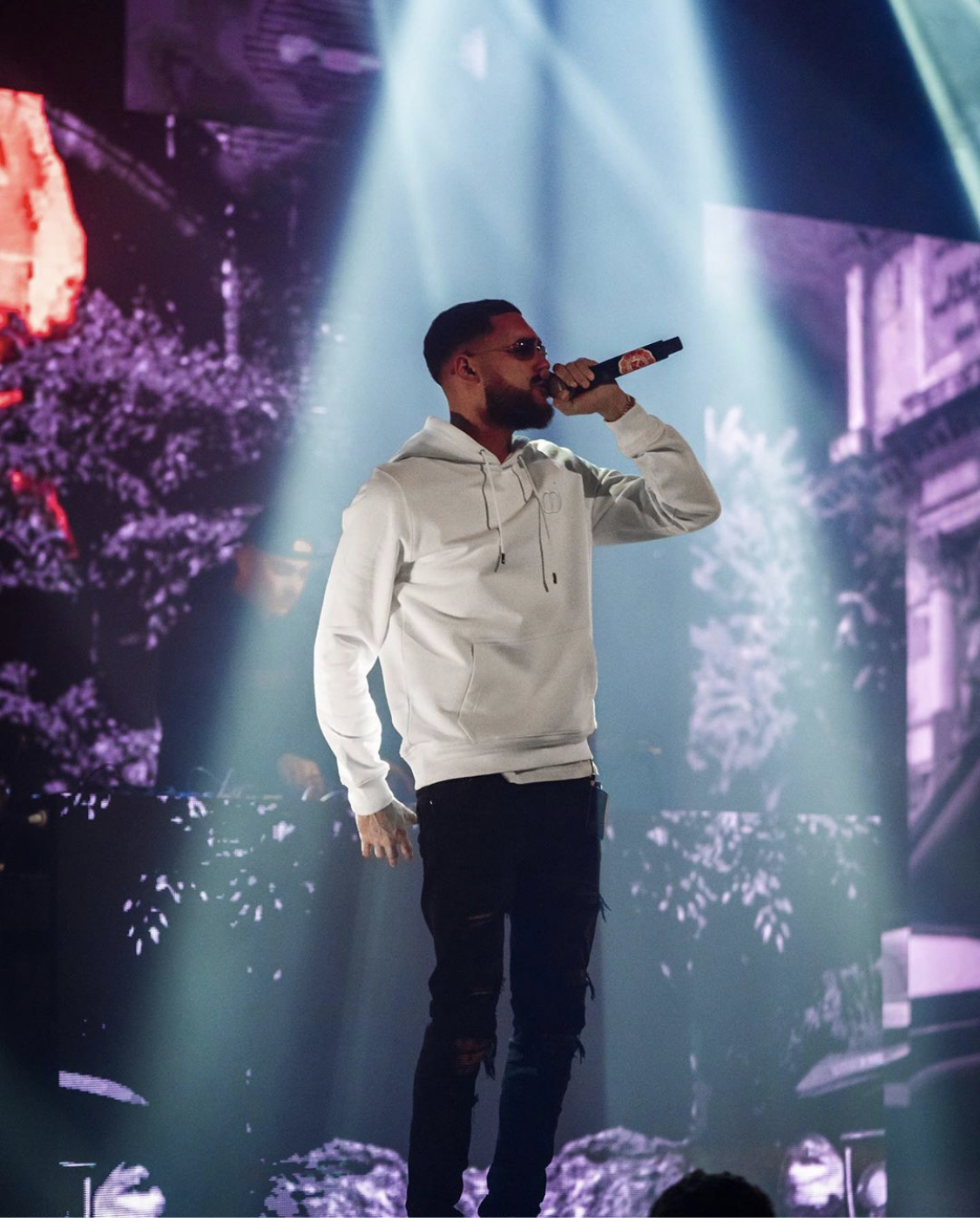
- Josylvio performing in 2019

Background information
- Born: Joost Theo Sylvio Yussef Abdelgalil Dowib; April 14, 1992 (age 34); Naarden, Netherlands
- Genre: Hip hop
- Occupation: Rapper
- Instrument: Vocals
- Years active: 2014–present
- Labels: Van Klasse; Hella Cash

Joost Theo Sylvio Yussef Abdelgalil Dowib (born April 14, 1992), known professionally as Josylvio, is a Dutch rapper. Starting his career in 2015, he released his debut studio album, Ma3seb, in 2016, followed by his second album, 2 gezichten, in 2017. Josylvio's third, Hella Cash (2018), fourth, Gimma (2019) and fifth album, Abu Omar (2021), have all topped the Dutch Albums Charts. In 2022, he released his sixth album titled Vallen & Opstaan. Josylvio has received multiple awards during his career, including Edison Award, XITE Award and FunX Music Award.

== Life and career ==
Born in Naarden to a Dutch mother and an Egyptian father, Josylvio started his career in 2015 under the name Jaybay. In 2015, he released the single "Le7nesh" with Sevn Alias. With success of the song, he released his debut album Ma3seb with Dutch hip hop producer Esko. The album reached number five on the Dutch Album Top 100 and earned him an Edison Award nomination. He released a number of singles that reached the Single Top 100, including in collaboration with other rappers, such as Ali B, Hef, Adje, Jairzinho, Kevin and others.

In 2017 Josylvio was featured on the collaborative album All Eyez on Us along with Latifah, Kempi, Sevn Alias, Vic9 and Rocks. The joint album was inspired by the documentary film All Eyez on Me about Tupac Shakur and a tribute to him. And in 2018, Josylvio took part in RTL reality program Expeditie Robinson in its 19th season finishing 18th.

== Discography ==
=== Albums ===
==== Studio albums ====
List of studio albums, with selected chart positions
Title	Year	Peak chart positions	
Title	Year	NLD	BEL (Fl)
Ma3seb	2016	5	—
2 gezichten	2017	2	34
Hella Cash	2018	1	3
Gimma	2019	1	7
Abu Omar	2021	1	2
Vallen & Opstaan	2022	3	23
Dopamine	2024	26	78
Regelaar	2025	17	—

==== Collaborative albums ====
List of collaborative albums, with selected chart positions
Title	Year	Peak chart positions	
Title	Year	NLD	BEL (Fl)
Hella Cash Gang Vol. 1 (with Moeman & KA)	2018	2	24

==== Compilation albums ====
List of compilation albums, with selected chart positions
Title	Year	Peak chart positions	
Title	Year	NLD	BEL (Fl)
All Eyez On Us (with Various Artists)	2017	2	185

=== Singles ===
==== As lead artist ====
List of singles, with selected chart positions
Title	Year	Peak chart positions		Album
Title	Year	NLD Single Top 100	BEL (Fl)	Album
"Westside" (feat. 3robi & Killer Kamal)	2017	32	Tip	
"Abu Dhabi" (with Kevin, Vic9 & Sevn Alias)	2017	30	—	2 gezichten
"Non Stop" (Hansie / Latifah / Josylvio)	2017	57	—	
"Ride or Die"	2017	1	Tip	
"Money Money" (with F1rstman & Lijpe feat. Bollebof)	2017	22	—	
"Skittle Stacking"	2018	5	33* (Ultratip)	Hella Cash
"Catch Up"	2018	1	12* (Ultratip)	Hella Cash
"Rich"	2018	6	Tip	Hella Cash
"Hey meisje" (with Esko & Hansie)	2018	1	Tip	
"Voorbij" (with Moeman)	2018	6	Tip	Hella Cash Gang Vol. 1
"Señorita" (with Young Ellens & Kevin feat. BKO)	2018	17	—	
"Coca" (with Bizzey, Yung Felix & Rockywhereyoubeen)	2018	13	—	
"Gimma"	2019	1	11* (Ultratip)	Gimma
"Money Baby" (feat. 3robi)	2019	10	36* (Ultratip)	
"Body"	2019	12	Tip	
"Cake"	2019	16	41* (Ultratip)	
"Jouw Love" (Lauwtje / Hansie / Josylvio)	2019	43	—	
"Haat"	2019	26	Tip	
"Waarom zoeken naar liefde" (feat. Mula B & Yung Felix)	2019	3	17* (Ultratip)	
"Vroeger" (feat. Esko)	2019	7	Tip	
"Ewa" (with Ashafar)	2020	19	—	
"Mama bid" (with Ashafar, Moeman and KA)	2020	38	—	
"Cash Machine" (featuring Yssi SB)	2021	29	—	
"Zoveel takkies"	2022	11	—	Vallen & Opstaan
"Fever"	2022	38	—	Vallen & Opstaan
"Vallen & Opstaan"	2022	66	—	Vallen & Opstaan
"Liegen" (with Jack)	2022	28	—	
"Soms" (featuring Antoon)	2022	21	—	
"African Boy" (with Ashafar and Dopebwoy)	2023	62	—	Non-album singles
"AMG" (with Shirak and Boef)	2023	6	—	Non-album singles
"Flip Flops"	2023	63	—	Non-album singles
"PK's" (featuring Moeman, Bokke8, Philly and KA)	2023	18	—	Non-album singles
"Tijden zijn veranderd"	2024	74	—	Non-album singles
"Kijk door me ogen"	2024	76	—	Non-album singles
"Mia" (with Cristian D and Shirak)	2024	81	—	Non-album singles
"Geldmachine" (with Dopebwoy and Boef)	2024	56	—	Non-album singles
"Tafel voor 2" (featuring KM)	2025	73	—	Non-album singles
"Toxic" (featuring Yung Felix)	2026	18	—	Non-album singles

*Did not appear in the official Belgian Ultratop 50 charts, but rather in the bubbling under Ultratip charts.

==== As featured artist ====
List of singles, with selected chart positions
Title	Year	Peak chart positions		Album
Title	Year	NLD Single Top 100	BEL (Fl)	Album
"Stop het in mn kontje" (Rollàn feat. Josylvio & Hef)	2016	95	—	
"Douane" (Ali B feat. Adje, Josylvio & Sevn Alias)	2016	88	—	
"Doorgaan" (Jairzinho feat. Kevin, Josylvio, BKO & Vic9)	2017	77	—	
"Money Like We" (with Sevn Alias, Kevin & Kempi)	2017	23	—	All Eyez On Us
"Mami Iz A Ridah" (with Kempi, Sevn Alias & Kevin)	2017	65	—	All Eyez On Us
"West" (with Sevn Alias & Rocks)	2017	99	—	All Eyez On Us
"Badman Ollo" (with Bizzey & Yung Felix feat. 3robi)	2017	59	—	
"Shaka Zulu" (with Yung Felix & Bizzey feat. Hef & Delivio Reavon)	2017	78	—	
"C'est la vie" (The Partysquad feat. Josylvio, Bizzey, Hansie & Broertje)	2017	26	—	
"Cocaina (Remix)" (Kempi x The Blockparty feat. Josylvio & Sevn Alias)	2017	9	Tip	
"Anders" (3robi feat. Sevn Alias & Josylvio)	2017	52	—	
"Roley" (Hef feat. Josylvio)	2017	74	—	
"Rock Ya Body" (Bizzey feat. Josylvio)	2018	60	—	
"PumPumPum" (Bizzey feat. Josylvio & Yung Felix)	2018	61	—	
"DM's" ($hirak feat. Adje, 3robi & Josylvio)	2018	44	—	
"Money" (Kevin feat. Josylvio)	2018	54	—	
"Vuurwerk" (Spanker feat. Josylvio, Lijpe & 3robi)	2018	18	Tip	
"Herres" (SBMG feat. D-Double, MocroManiac & Josylvio)	2018	39		
"Getallen" (Spanker, Bokoesam & Josylvio feat. Jandro)	2018	95		
"Family Things" (MocroManiac feat. Josylvio)	2018	95		
"What's The Key" (Broederliefde feat. Josylvio)	2018	53		
"Mag het ff lekker gaan" (Sevn Alias feat. Josylvio)	2018	7	26* (Ultratip)	
"Lil mama" (Idaly feat. Josylvio)	2018	10		
"Bitch Move" (Kraantje Pappie feat. Josylvio)	2018	76		
"Weet niet" (JoeyAK feat. Josylvio)	2018	56		
"Lifestyle" (Zefanio feat. Josylvio)	2018	100		
"Leugens" (Lauwtje feat. Josylvio & Esko)	2019	93	—	
"Baila Mami" (Bizzey feat. Josylvio & YOUNGBAEKANSIE)	2019	48	—	
"Gangsta Boppin" (Sevn Alias feat. Josylvio & F.I)	2019	58	—	
"Lamborghini" (Ashafar feat. Josylvio)	2019	8	—	
"Fully Designer" (Sam J'taime feat. Josylvio)	2022	—	—	

*Did not appear in the official Belgian Ultratop 50 charts, but rather in the bubbling under Ultratip charts.

=== Other charted songs ===
List of singles, with selected chart positions
Title	Year	Peak chart positions		Album
Title	Year	NLD Single Top 100	BEL (Fl)	Album
"On the Low" (with Adje, Kevin & D-Double)	2016	71	—	
"Kleine jongen"	2017	37	—	2 gezichten
"Betaal mij" (with Boef)	2017	50	—	2 gezichten
"Double Up" (with Hef & Kevin)	2017	53	—	2 gezichten
"Mama"	2017	54	—	2 gezichten
"Steeds iets meer"	2017	56	—	2 gezichten
"Onderweg"	2017	60	—	2 gezichten
"Meters" (with Sevn Alias)	2017	66	—	2 gezichten
"Lil Bish"	2017	76	—	2 gezichten
"Intro 2 gezichten"	2017	93	—	2 gezichten
"Voor alle Soldiers" (with Sevn Alias)	2017	17	—	
"Op je hoede" (feat. Hef & Moeman)	2018	4	Tip	Hella Cash
"Skiemen" (feat. Frenna)	2018	5	—	Hella Cash
"Fake Love"	2018	6	—	Hella Cash
"Automatic"	2018	12	—	Hella Cash
"Nefertiti"	2018	16	—	Hella Cash
"Jompo" (feat. 3robi)	2018	18	—	Hella Cash
"Alles of niets" (feat. Sevn Alias)	2018	19	—	Hella Cash
"Beweeg"	2018	21	—	Hella Cash
"Gold Chain" (feat. Yade Lauren & Kevin)	2018	27	—	Hella Cash
"Paars licht"	2018	28	—	Hella Cash
"Unstoppable"	2018	35	—	Hella Cash
"No Go" (feat. Zefanio)	2018	42	—	Hella Cash
"Cash" (with SFB)	2018	58	—	
"Money komt, Money gaat"	2018	17	—	Hella Cash
"Hood Rich" (feat. Alrima)	2018	27	—	Hella Cash
"HCG"	2018	36	—	Hella Cash
"Mijn zijde" (feat. Jayh)	2018	77	—	Hella Cash
"Intro"	2018	11	Tip	Hella Cash
"Killer instinct" (with Appa & Momi)	2018	29	—	
"Streets" (with Moeman feat. Hef, Adje, JoeyAK, Ashafar & LaFunky)	2018	28	—	Hella Cash Gang Vol. 1
"Wie ben jij"	2018	49	—	Hella Cash Gang Vol. 1
"On Lock" (with Moeman)	2018	77	—	Hella Cash Gang Vol. 1
"Andale" (feat. Ashafar & Mario Cash)	2018	82	—	Hella Cash Gang Vol. 1
"Geswitched" (with Moeman)	2018	85	—	Hella Cash Gang Vol. 1
"VVS" (with Frenna)	2018	15	—	
"Geboren Flex" (feat. Idaly)	2019	29	—	Gimma
"Day One" (feat. Lijpe)	2019	32	—	Gimma
"Bankrekening" (feat. Hef)	2019	40	—	Gimma
"Game Over"	2019	41	—	Gimma
"Get Mine" (feat. Kevin)	2019	43	—	Gimma
"No Love" (feat. Frenna)	2019	55	—	Gimma
"La La Love"	2019	78	—	Gimma

== Awards and nominations ==
Year	Ceremony	Award	Work	Result
2017	Edison Awards	Best Hip Hop	Ma3seb	Nominated
2017	XITE Awards	Best Kickstart	Himself	Won
2018	FunX Music Awards	Best Album	Hella Cash	Won
2018	FunX Music Awards	Best Song	"Catch Up"	Won
2018	Buma Awards	Most Successful Urban Album	Hella Cash	Nominated
2018	Buma Awards	Most Successful Urban Single	"Catch Up"	Nominated
2019	FunX Music Awards	Male Artist of the Year	Himself	Nominated
2019	FunX Music Awards	Best MC	Himself	Nominated
2019	Buma Awards	Most Successful Urban Album	Hella Cash	Nominated
2019	MTV Europe Music Awards	Best Dutch Act	Himself	Nominated
2020	Edison Awards	Best Hip Hop	Gimma	Won
2020	FunX Music Awards	Male Artist of the Year	Himself	Nominated
2020	FunX Music Awards	Best MC	Himself	Nominated
2020	FunX Music Awards	Best Collaboration	"Waarom Zoeken Naar Liefde" (with Mula B and Yung Felix)	Nominated
2020	FunX Music Awards	Best Song	"Waarom Zoeken Naar Liefde" (with Mula B and Yung Felix)	Nominated
2020	FunX Music Awards	Best Music Video	"Paper Zien" (Remix) (with Yssi SB, D-Double, Henkie T, Jack and Sevn Alias)	Won
2020	Buma Awards	Most Successful Hip Hop Album	Gimma	Nominated
2021	FunX Music Awards	Best Music Video	"Het Leven Is Een Trip" (with Lijpe)	Won
2022	FunX Music Awards	Male Artist of the Year	Himself	Won
2022	FunX Music Awards	Best MC	Himself	Nominated
