= Sevn Alias =

Dutch rapper

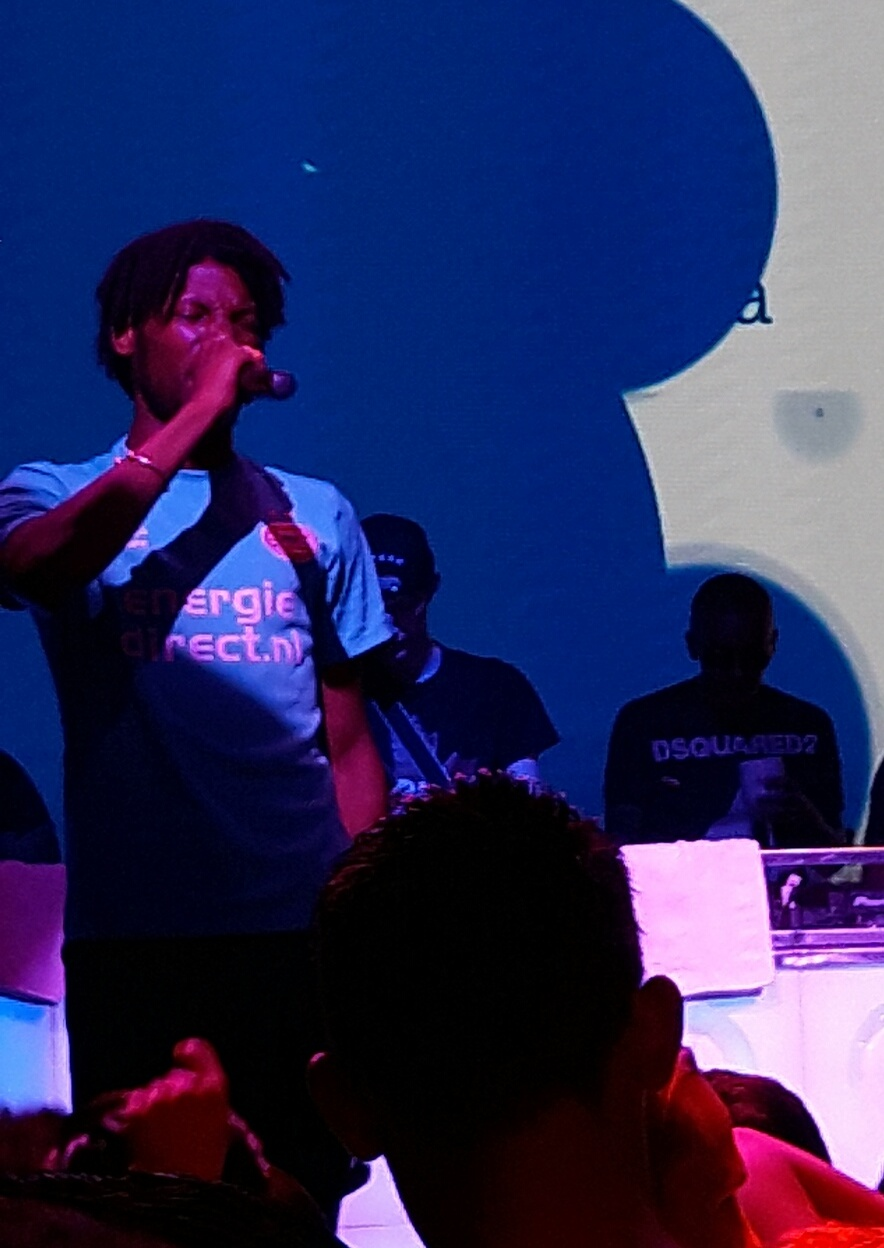
- Sevn Alias

Background information
- Born: Sevaio Mook; 5 October 1996 (age 30); Amsterdam, Netherlands
- Genres: Nederhop, hip hop
- Occupations: Rapper; Koerier
- Instrument: Vocals
- Years active: 2014–2023
- Labels: Rotterdam Airlines, 1OAK

Sevaio Mook (born in Amsterdam on 5 October 1996), better known by the stage name Sevn Alias, is a former Dutch rapper.

== Life and Career ==
The son of a Surinamese father and a Surinamese-Curaçaoan mother, he grew up in Amsterdam-West among North African youth and was affected by their music. He was signed to Rotterdam Airlines label releasing mixtapes and albums. In 2018, he had a supporting role in video series Mocro Maffia. A fan of AFC Ajax, he released the single "Herres" as promotion for AFC Ajax's success in the Champions League.

== Discography ==
=== Studio albums ===
List of studio albums, with selected chart positions
Title	Year	Peak chart positions	
Title	Year	NLD	BEL (Fl)
Trap Grammy	2016	6	142
Picasso	2017	1	9
Oakinn	2018	2	13
Recasso	2018	2	6
Sirius	2019	2	11
Six Summers	2019	4	26
The Last Flowbender	2022	13	103
Twaalfde ronde	2023	7	82

=== Collective albums ===
List of studio albums, with selected chart positions
Title	Year	Peak chart positions	
Title	Year	NLD	BEL (Fl)
All Eyez on Us (with Kempi, Josylvio, Vic9, Latifah, Rocks & Kevin)	2017	2	185

=== Mixtapes ===
List of studio albums, with selected chart positions
Title	Year	Peak chart positions	
Title	Year	NLD	BEL (Fl)
Twenty Four Sevn	2015	—	—
Twenty Four Sevn 2	2016	10	—
Twenty Four Sevn 3	2016	2	139
Precasso	2017	—	—
Twenty Four Sevn 4	2019	1	23

=== Singles ===
List of singles or releases, with selected chart positions
Title	Year	Peak chart positions		Album
Title	Year	NLD	BEL (Fl)	Album
"Ma3lish" (Sevn Alias X Frenna X D-Double)	2015	58	—	
"Kifesh"	2016	42	—	
"Woosh" (Sevn Alias x Jonna Fraser x Lijpe)	2016	73	—	
"LA" / "Bentley"	2016	94	—	
"Summer 16"	2016	39	—	
"Gass" (feat. Jason Futuristic, BKO & Jairzinho)	2016	3	Tip	
"Now She See Me" (Two Crooks / Jairzinho / Sevn Alias)	2016	27	—	
"Turnen (De Fissa Anthem)" (feat. Jairzinho & Kevin)	2016	25	—	
"Qifesh"	2017	40	—	
"Money Like We" (with Kevin, Josylvio & Kempi)	2017	23	—	Collective album All Eyes On Us
"Patsergedrag" (feat. Lil Kleine & Boef)	2017	1	21	
"In Amsterdam" (feat. Maan)	2017	3	Tip	Picasso
"Bandz voor de fam" (with Eves Laurent)	2018	62	—	
"Hoofdprijs"	2018	11	Tip	
"Seeka"	2018	32	Tip	
"Mag het ff lekker gaan" (feat. Josylvio)	2018	7	26* (Ultratip)	Recasso
"Big Man" (feat. Mula B & Trobeats)	2019	3	28* (Ultratip)	
"Givenchy Steppin"	2019	26	Tip	
"Dom" (feat. Boef)	2019	19	Tip	
"Herres"	2019	2	11* (Ultratip)	
"Siktir Lan"	2019	71	—	
"Nacht actief"	2019	31	—	
"Throwback"	2021	51	—	
"Kenan & Kel"	2021	52	—	
"Sinner"	2021	45	—	
"Iedereen laag" (with Lijpe)	2022	53	—	
"Lions"	2022	— (Note: "Lions" did not enter the Dutch Single Top 100, but peaked at number one on the Single Tip chart.)	—	
"Train"	2022	76	—	
"Choppa" (with D-Double)	2022	86	—	
"Jij & ik"	2023	92	—	
"Doe wat je doet" (with Bryan Mg and SRNO)	2023	88	—	

*Did not appear in the official Belgian Ultratop 50 charts, but rather in the bubbling under Ultratip charts.

=== Featured in ===
List of singles or releases, with selected chart positions
Title	Year	Peak chart positions		Album
Title	Year	NLD	BEL (Fl)	Album
"Mandela" (SBMG with Sevn Alias, Louis, D-Double, Lijpe & Hef)	2015	58	—	
"Say No More" (SFB feat. Sevn Alias)	2015	76	—	
"Een klein beetje geluk" (Ali B feat. Sevn Alias & Boef)	2016	58	—	
"One Night Stand" (B-Brave feat. Sevn Alias)	2016	4	47* (Ultratip)	
"Codes" (Lijpe feat. Sevn Alias)	2016	57	—	
"Douane" (Ali B feat. Adje, Josylvio & Sevn Alias)	2016	88	—	
"Waarom" (Kevin feat. Sevn Alias)	2016	16	—	
"In de Streets" (Kevin feat. Lijpe, Sevn Alias, Kippie & Vic9)	2016	36	—	
"Hustlers" (Hef feat. Sevn Alias, D-Double & SBMG)	2016	89	—	
"Tempo" (Jairzinho feat. Sevn Alias, BKO & Boef)	2017	2	25* (Ultratip)	
"Niks nieuws" (Jonna Fraser feat. Jayh & Sevn Alias)	2017	45	—	
"Mattaboy" (BKO feat. Jairzinho & Sevn Alias)	2017	96	—	
"Leef nu" (Adje feat. Sevn Alias)	2017	94	—	
"Opgekomen" (Ronnie Flex feat. Sevn Alias)	2017	39	—	
"Pon Road" (SFB feat. Sevn Alias)	2017	30	—	
"Cocaine (Remix)" (Kempi x The Blockparty feat. Josylvio & Sevn Alias)	2017	9	Tip	
"Architect" (Jonna Fraser feat. Sevn Alias & Frenna)	2017	4	Tip	
"Touchdown" (Jonna Fraser feat. JoeyAK & Sevn Alias)	2017	30	—	
"Better Days" (Frenna & Diquenza feat. Sevn Alias)	2017	34	—	
"Karaat" (Frenna & Diquenza feat. Sevn Alias & KM)	2017	40	—	
"Gunman" (Vic9 feat. Sevn Alias)	2017	45	—	
"Anders" (3robi feat. Sevn Alias & Josylvio)	2017	52	—	
"Als ik naar huis ga" (Hef feat. Kevin & Sevn Alias)	2017	42	—	
"Binnenkort" (Spanker feat. Jayh, Sevn Alias, Kempi & Jonna Fraser)	2017	99	—	
"Karate" (JoeyAK feat. Sevn Alias, Vic9 & D Double)	2018	88	—	
"Alles of niets" (Josylvio feat. Sevn Alias)	2018	19	—	
"Gelijk gelijk" (Kevin feat. Sevn Alias)	2018	55	—	
"Nieuwe tijd" (Mula B feat. Sevn Alias)	2018	58	—	
"Dichterbij" (Esko feat. Josylvio & Sevn Alias)	2018	43	—	
"Zo niet mij" (Esko feat. Latifah & Sevn Alias)	2018	60	—	
"Maak guap" (Lucass feat. Sevn Alias)	2018	74	—	
"Pray For Job" (Jonna Fraser feat. Young Ellens, Sevn Alias & MocroManiac)	2018	26	—	
"Don't Fuck With Me" (Woenzelaar feat. Sevn Alias)	2018	89	—	
"SVP" (Boef feat. JoeyAK, Young Ellens & Sevn Alias)	2018	6	10* (Ultratip)	
"Ze loevt" (Frenna feat. Yxng Bane & Sevn Alias)	2019	32	—	
"Drama" (Kevin feat. Sevn Alias)	2019	71	—	
"IJs" (Murda feat. Idaly & Sevn Alias)	2019	48	—	
"Pinpas" (Cho feat. Sevn Alias)	2019	43	—	
"Sick" (Mani feat. Sevn Alias)	2019	80	—	
"Anoniem" (Chivv feat. Sevn Alias & D-Double)	2019	24	—	
"Tijd is geld" (Djezja feat. Sevn Alias)	2019	54	—	
"Timeline" (Bokke8 feat. Sevn Alias)	2019	85	—	
"Acrobatiek" (Mensa feat. Sevn Alias)	2019	76	—	

*Did not appear in the official Belgian Ultratop 50 charts, but rather in the bubbling under Ultratip charts.

=== Other charting songs ===
List of singles or releases, with selected chart positions
Title	Year	Peak chart positions		Album
Title	Year	NLD	BEL (Fl)	Album
"2 Cups" / "Geen rust" (feat. Jonna Fraser)	2016	75	—	
"Wegen"	2016	84	—	
"Beweging" (feat. Kevin)	2016	84	—	
"ADF"	2016	89	—	
"Dribbel" (feat. Kevin & Young'mills)	2016	92	—	
"Mandem" (feat. Jairzinho & JB Scofield)	2016	93	—	
"Layhoun"	2016	95	—	
"Weg van alle stress" (feat. GLOWINTHEDARK)	2016	52	—	Trap Grammy
"Systeem" (feat. I Am Aisha)	2016	67	—	Trap Grammy
"Dope Game" (feat. Hef)	2016	78	—	Trap Grammy
"Zonder jou" (feat. Jairzinho)	2016	89	—	Trap Grammy
"Madre"	2016	99	—	Trap Grammy
"Slapend Rijk" (with Boef)	2017	3	23* (Ultratip)	
"Abu Dhabi" (with Josylvio, Kevin & Vic9)	2017	30	—	Josylvio album 2 gezichten
"Meters" (with Josylvio)	2017	60	—	Josylvio album 2 gezichten
"Mami Iz A Ridah" (with Kempi, Josylvio & Kevin)	2017	30	—	Collective album All Eyes On Us
"Afeni Shakur" (with Kempi & Rocks)	2017	90	—	Collective album All Eyes On Us
"West" (with Josylvio & Rocks)	2017	99	—	Collective album All Eyes On Us
"Nachtmerrie"	2017	33	—	Precasso
"Work" (feat. Jonna Fraser)	2017	40	—	Precasso
"Mowgli"	2017	47	—	Precasso
"Blessed"	2017	33	Tip	Precasso
"Voor alle Soldiers" (with Josylvio)	2017	17	—	Picasso
"Mufasa"	2017	22	—	Picasso
"Rijk moeten zijn"	2017	40	—	Picasso
"Flu & tip" (with Kevin)	2017	42	—	Picasso
"Inna Minute" (feat. Jayh)	2017	43	—	Picasso
"Rain"	2017	46	—	Picasso
"Put In Work" (feat. Jonna Fraser)	2017	49	—	Picasso
"Stage"	2017	50	—	Picasso
"CSI"	2017	53	—	Picasso
"Ends"	2017	55	—	Picasso
"Swervin'" (feat. Kempi)	2017	57	—	Picasso
"Intro" (from Picasso)	2017	64	—	Picasso
"Fit"	2017	72	—	Picasso
"Ik trap"	2018	25	—	Oakinn
"My Life"	2018	36	—	Oakinn
"240"	2018	53	—	Oakinn
"Stacks"	2018	66	—	Oakinn
"Dresscode"	2018	72	—	Oakinn
"Big Bank"	2018	75	—	Oakinn
"Oakinn"	2018	83	—	Oakinn
"Necklace"	2018	95	—	Oakinn
"Caught Up"	2018	97	—	Oakinn
"L.I.A.B." (feat. Candy Dulfer)	2018	33	—	Recasso
"Duw"	2018	41	—	Recasso
"6 Million Ways"	2018	45	—	Recasso
"Niet Down" (feat. Mr. Probz)	2018	51	—	Recasso
"Icin' It Out"	2018	57	—	Recasso
"Volg mij" (feat. Sigourney K)	2018	65	—	Recasso
"Begrijp je"	2018	69	—	Recasso
"Tiësto"	2018	78	—	Recasso
"Hennessy" (feat. Beenie Man)	2018	79	—	Recasso
"Location"	2018	89	—	Recasso
"Migos"	2018	91	—	Recasso
"Brother" (feat. Kevin)	2018	97	—	Recasso
"Soldaat" (with Murda, Jayh, Cho)	2018	74	—	
"Bottom" (feat. JoeyAK)	2019	52	—	
"Gangsta Boppin" (feat. Josylvio & F.I.)	2019	58	—	Sirius
"Baller Alert" (feat. Ronnie Flex)	2019	64	—	Sirius
"Middle"	2019	66	—	Sirius
"Enkelsok" (feat. Lil Kleine)	2019	77	—	Sirius
"Balenciaga 2"	2019	87	—	Sirius
"Hot Summer"	2019	90	—	Sirius

*Did not appear in the official Belgian Ultratop 50 charts, but rather in the bubbling under Ultratip charts.
