= Extince =

Dutch rapper (born 1967)

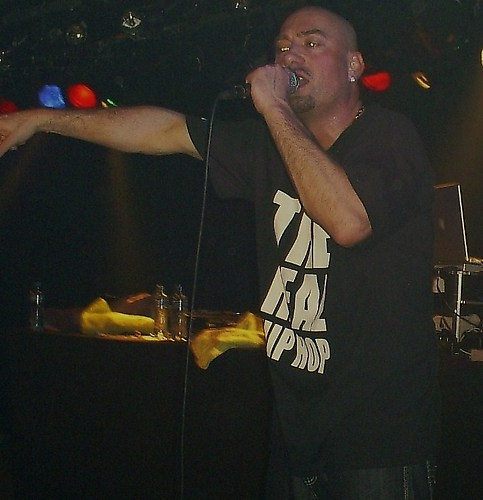

Background information
- Born: Peter Kops; 1967 (age 58–59)
- Origin: Oosterhout, Netherlands
- Genre: Hip hop
- Years active: 1987–present

Peter Kops (born 1967), known professionally as Extince (also known as "Exter-O-naldus" or "De Exter"), is one of the first Dutch language rappers, or Dutch Hip-Hoppers to achieve a top-40 hit in the mainstream Dutch music charts. His hit song "Spraakwater" rose into the top-ten, and was a historic breakthrough for Dutch-language rap & hip-hop – even more than for the artist himself.

Extince was born as Peter Kops in Oosterhout, Netherlands. One of his biggest musical influences as a child was Creedence Clearwater Revival.

== Overview ==
His first successful song, "The Milkshake Rap", was written completely in the English language. His first song in Dutch, "Spraakwater", was an immediate hit upon its release in 1995. It contains samples from the famous Dutch children's television series De Fabeltjeskrant. Another important Dutch hip-hop group, Osdorp Posse, recorded a parody of "Spraakwater" called "Braakwater".

Extince's second hit was "Kaal of Kammen", released in 1996 as a response to "Braakwater". His first album, Binnenlandse Funk ("Domestic Funk"), came out in 1998. It was in the Dutch Top 40 for two months, and reached number 12 at its peak. One of the most popular songs on this album was "Viervoeters".

Extince released a second album, Vitamine E, in 2001. Its most popular song was released "Grootheidswaan". In January 2004, he released a third album, 2e jeugd. In 2007 he released the album Toch?.

After some years of relative silence, Extince released a new album in 2015.

== Albums ==
- Binnenlandse Funk (1998)
- Vitamine E (2001)
- 2e Jeugd (2004)
- De avonturen van de Exter-O-naldus (2005)
- Toch? (2007)
- De winnaar houdt aan (2012)
- X (2015)
- Kermis (2019)
