= Tuindorp Hustler Click =

Dutch rap group

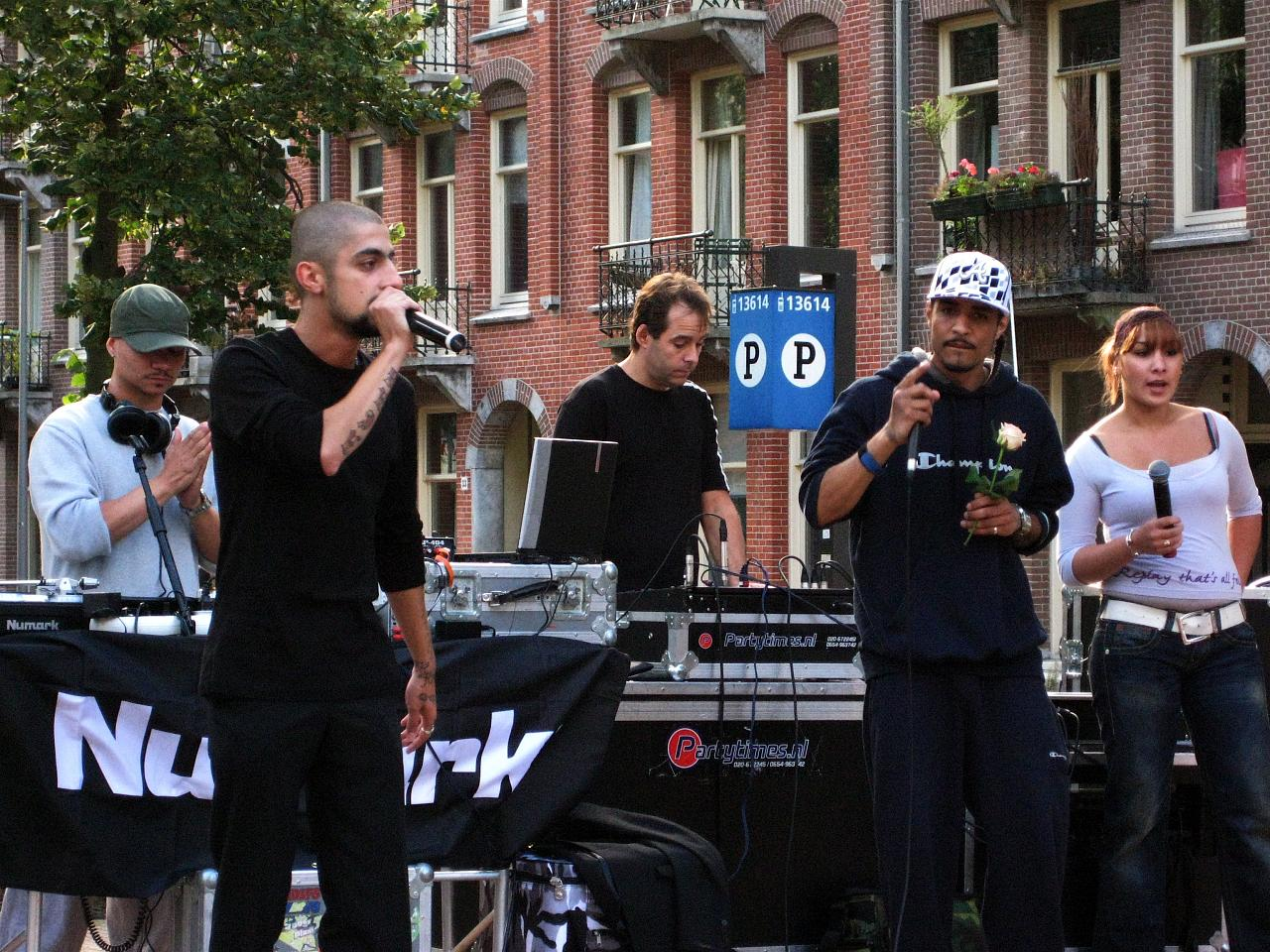
- THC in 2007

Background information
- Also known as: THC
- Origin: Amsterdam, Netherlands
- Genres: Hip hop
- Years active: 1996–present
- Labels: THC Recordz, TopNotch

The Tuindorp Hustler Click (THC) is a Dutch rap group that was created in 1995 in Tuindorp Oostzaan in the northern part of Amsterdam. The group was created by several guys with different backgrounds, but with one thing in common: they all live in Tuindorp Oostzaan. That is where the name comes from, they are all from Tuindorp Oostzaan, and they see themselves as a click.

== Biography ==
=== Birth ===
Around 1997, a member of the group named Rocks started rapping. He made a studio in his own room. His friends often came by and they started rapping. They rapped about their life, and their beliefs. They started selling their first CD on the streets, and it was put on the internet by someone else. At first they weren't happy with this, but when they found out that people got interested in them because of this, they thought it was convenient. THC got more famous over time.

=== Breakthrough ===
The group started performing in small clubs themselves. They got help from a friend of theirs who was a DJ, DJ Chainsaw. He went with them to every clubs to play the beats that they rapped on. THC continued to create several other songs and clips. They signed a record deal with Walboomers, then the song "Wil je weten hoe het voelt" was created. THC continued to write new songs, songs like "Wil je weten hoe het voelt", "Bitch", "Je bent niet alleen" and "In de noordside" all became hit songs, that were even in the top-100 list in the Netherlands for a while. THC became infamous for getting into fights with other rappers, like Negativ and Royaal Family, both of these rappers wrote a song about THC to ridicule them.

=== New album ===
In March 2007 the second official album of THC was released and it contains 20 songs. The new member Flex was not on this album yet, because he was sentenced to two years in prison, and was not attending the recording of all the songs. Even though most loyal fans liked the album, it was not well received by new fans. They thought that Tupac had too big of an influence on the rappers, and the difference in skill of several rappers in the group made the songs off-balanced. It is also said that the songs sound too much like the songs of the first album.

== THC members ==
- The members of THC are: Rocks, RBdjan, Zuen, d'Tuniz, Kenna, Menace, Ace, Kingo, Lanni B, DJ Chainsaw, Da Crhymerz.
- Former members of THC are: Appa, Hittespitter Flex, Miss Sophie.
- The following were not official members of THC, but were associated with THC Recordz: Badboy Taya & Naffer

=== Appa ===
Since 2005 Appa is no longer a member of THC. However, this information wasn't released to the rest of the world until 2006, when Appa said it himself in an interview. Appa said that the reason he left is because he had several conflicts with two other rappers in the group. He is now pursuing a solo career.

=== Solo ===
Some members of THC have also done some solo work, and released some of their own records.

- Rocks - Rocky 1: De BN'er Preview Mixtape (2008)
- Rocks - B.N.'er (Bekende N.i.g.g.a.) (2008)
- Hittespitter Flex - 666 Mixtape (2008)
- RB Djan - De Onderbaas (2011)
- Hittespitter Flex - Dresscode Blacka EP (2012)
