= FENIX Museum of Migration =

Coordinates: 51.9022°N 4.4843°E

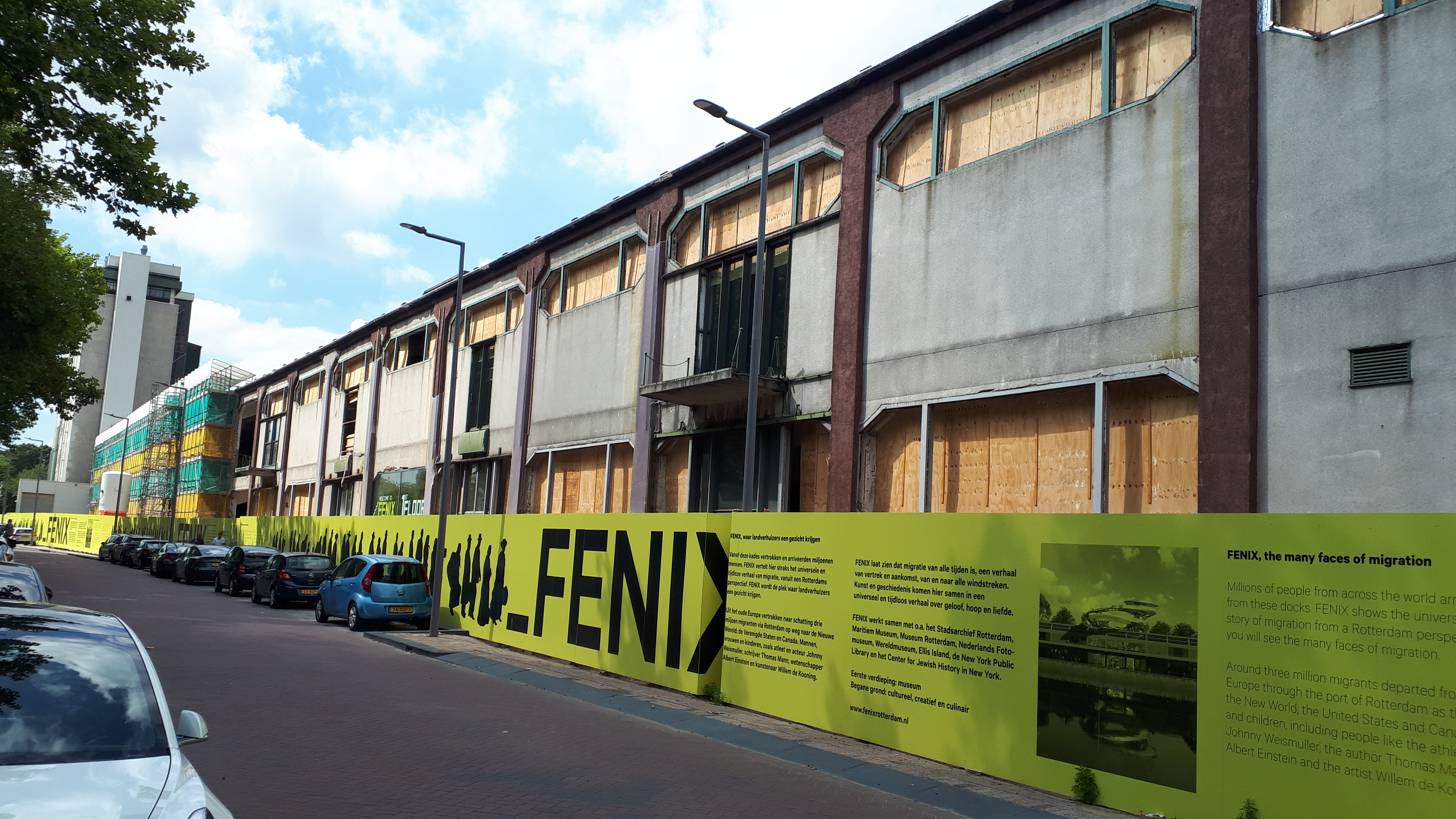
- Established: 2025
- Location: Rotterdam, the Netherlands
- Type: Art museum, History museum

The FENIX Museum of Migration is a museum dedicated to human migration, located within the former Fenix warehouse in Rotterdam, the Netherlands. It was opened on 16 May 2025.

The museum has two inaugural exhibitions. Firstly All Directions: Art That Moves You, featuring works drawn from the museum's permanent collection, including pieces by Francis Alÿs, Cornelia Parker and Do Ho Suh; and secondly The Family of Migrants, an exhibition inspired by Edward Steichen’s Family of Man at the Museum of Modern Art in New York City, which presents 194 photographs on the subject of migration.

FENIX is funded by the Droom en Daad Foundation, founded in 2016 and led by former Rijksmuseum director Wim Pijbes. The director is Anne Kremers

In July 2025, the museum welcomed its 100,000th visitor, marking over 100,000 visits in its first two months. It reached the 500,000 mark within a year of its opening.

== Design ==
The museum is designed by Chinese architectural firm MAD Architects, and is MAD's first cultural project in Europe. The museum is situated in the former Fenix warehouse, located in the Katendrecht Peninsula. The warehouse spans over 16,000 square meters. The warehouse, designed by Cornelis Nicolaas van Goor, was originally constructed in 1923, and was previously known as the San Francisco Warehouse. The warehouse was used extensively by the Holland-America Line for storage and shipping purposes. The Holland-American Line facilitated the migration of millions of Europeans to the United States in the late 19th and early 20th century.

=== Tornado ===
Along with the Fenix warehouse, the museum features a twisting structure known as the Tornado, symbolizing the travels taken by migrants across the world. According to Ma Yansong, founder of MAD architects, Tornado "both signifies the Fenix’s witnessing of Europe’s history of migration from the port, and symbolizes the future of the city". Tornado is 30 meters tall and is covered by 297 highly polished stainless-steel panels manufactured in the Dutch city of Groningen. Open to visitors, the Tornado includes a 550-meter double helix wooden staircase that allows views of the Rotterdam skyline.

=== Danshuis ===
Adjacent to the Fenix museum, the former Provimi warehouse will be adapted into Danshuis, or the Rotterdam Central for Dance.
