= Kempi =

Dutch rapper (born 1986)

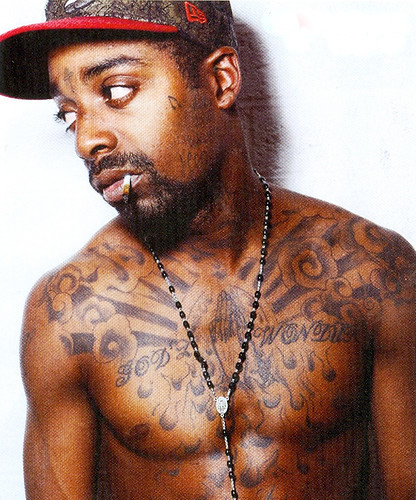

Background information
- Born: Jerreley Zanian John Slijger; June 18, 1986 (age 40); Helmond, North Brabant, Netherlands
- Origin: Eindhoven, North Brabant, Netherlands
- Genres: Gangsta rap; Nederhop
- Instrument: Vocals
- Years active: 2006–present
- Label: TopNotch
- Website: www.tiskempi.nl

Jerreley Zanian John Slijger (born June 18, 1986), known by his stage name Kempi, is a Dutch rapper.

From 2006 to 2012 Kempi was signed at Dutch label TopNotch. He has released two studio albums, four EPs and seven mixtapes to date. In 2008 Kempi was named "Best Hip-Hop Artist" in the Netherlands at the State Awards. Kempi is also notorious for his extensive criminal record.

== Personal life ==
Kempi was born Jerreley Zanian John Slijger on June 18, 1986 in Helmond to Curaçaoan parents and grew up in Woensel-West, a deprived neighborhood in Eindhoven, as the fourth of seven children. As a teenager he went to a school for children with behavioral problems and started to participate in criminal activities, such as dealing in cocaine and heroin. He built a very extensive criminal record, including various prison sentences.

In February 2018, Kempi announced that he had converted to Islam.

Kempi has five children.

== Musical career ==
Influenced by Tupac Shakur, Lil Wayne, and Dutch rapper Duvel, Kempi began to write down his street-life experiences, but wasn't seriously into hip-hop yet. However, after performing in a hip-hop group named Drama, Kempi got encouraged to make his own music, and subsequently recorded his own mixtape Tsss Kempi in 2006 which was downloaded at least forty thousand times from the internet. Kempi began to gain national prominence and was noticed by record label owner Kees de Koning, who offered him a contract on his label TopNotch which Kempi signed in jail. When Kempi signed the contract (September 2006) he was under suspicion of complicity in a stabbing; he was later found guilty. Kempi came out of custody after his second mixtape Rap 'N Borie (English: Rap 'N Crack) and third mixtape Mixtape 3.1 were released.

On July 17, 2007 Kempi met his father for the first time and his girlfriend gave birth to a son. On September 19, 2008, Kempi's second son was born. Shortly thereafter he was arrested for pointing a gun at Hungarian rapper; he was arrested and sentenced to a year of imprisonment. While in prison, his debut album Du Zoon (English: Tha Son) was released. Kempi's fourth mixtape was released in 2009, Mixtape 3.2: Du Evolutie van 'n Nigga (English: Tha Evolution of a Nigga). In 2010 Kempi produced another mixtape titled Du Gangsta Tape: It's Official. In June 2011 Kempi released his second studio album titled Het Testament van Zanian Adamus (English: The Testament of Zanian Adamus).

On September 7, 2012, Kempi announced that he was going to quit his musical career. Kempi was sentenced to eight months' imprisonment for an ongoing lawsuit of domestic violence. He came out of prison in June 2013. In September 2013, he made his musical comeback announcing his single "Trug Ben" (English: "I'm Back"). The same month however, he was sentenced to jail for prostituting a 16-year-old girl. He was released from prison on December 18, 2014.

== Controversies ==
In February 2007 Kempi was found guilty of assault. During the appeal he was sentenced to one month's imprisonment. After spending six months in custody, he left prison. However, in March 2007, Kempi committed another crime; he was involved in an altercation at a nightclub in Veendam, during which he threatened another man with a gun. According to a newspaper, someone from his rap formation pulled a gun; according to eyewitnesses it was Kempi himself. Kempi attempted to escape but he was arrested near Zwolle. In June 2008, Kempi was sentenced to twelve months' imprisonment for a series of serious crimes, including threats with a firearm.

One month after Kempi announced that he was retiring from his music career in September 2012, he was incarcerated again. He was initially sentenced to two months in prison for assaulting his then-girlfriend, who was also the mother of his second and third children. He subsequently spent an additional six months in pre-trial detention after being charged with human trafficking. The charge alleged that Kempi had forced a sixteen-year-old girl into prostitution in 2010. Kempi was released in early June 2013,but was sentenced to fifteen months’ imprisonment for the human-trafficking offence in September of that year. That month also brought news regarding his music career, as Kempi made his comeback with the single “Trug ben”. After five months in pre-trial detention and seven months in prison, Kempi was released on 18 December 2014.

On 23 September 2015, Kempi encountered further legal difficulties. Police found a semi-automatic firearm, a CZ Scorpion, and accompanying ammunition at his home in Helmond. He was also found to be in possession of 5.4 grams of cocaine. The rapper was detained at the remand prison in Grave and appeared in court on 22 January 2016. He was sentenced to twelve months’ imprisonment. He was also required to serve an additional 97 days from a previously suspended sentence.

In January 2018, Kempi was convicted by the police court in ’s-Hertogenbosch of assaulting his former girlfriend. The incident took place at her home in Helmond in September 2017. The court found that he had grabbed her by the throat and struck her in the face. He was acquitted of attempted aggravated assault because it could not be established that he had intended to strangle her.

Kempi was sentenced to two months' imprisonment, of which fifty days were suspended. The unconditional portion of ten days was equal to the time he had already spent in pre-trial detention. He was also given a probationary period of three years.

In determining the sentence, the court took Kempi’s previous convictions into account, including convictions for domestic violence. According to behavioural experts, Kempi had diminished criminal responsibility at the time of the offence due to an antisocial personality disorder with narcissistic traits. He was receiving treatment for the condition. The court therefore imposed a largely suspended prison sentence so that his treatment would not have to be interrupted.

During the hearing, Kempi was temporarily removed from the courtroom after repeatedly interrupting the public prosecutor. He was allowed to return for the pronouncement of the judgment.

In October 2023, Kempi appeared before the court at Schiphol Airport on suspicion of drug possession and circulating counterfeit money. According to the indictment, he had allegedly been in possession of approximately 490 grams of cocaine, more than four kilograms of cannabis and counterfeit €50 banknotes on 12 May 2021.

In 2025, Kempi repeatedly threatened to kill a woman who was pregnant by him. In March 2026, he was sentenced to seven months in prison and a restraining order; he appealed the ruling.

In June 2026, Kempi was ordered to pay €90,000 for violating an earlier court order concerning a video of his minor son. That same month, he announced that he was again retiring from music.

== Discography ==
=== Studio albums ===
- Du Zoon (Tha Son) (2008, TopNotch)
- Het Testament van Zanian Adamus (The Testament of Zanian Adamus) (2011, TopNotch)
- Oompie Keke (2019, TopNotch)

=== Collaborations ===
- Rap & Glorie (Rap & Glory) (2016, TopNotch) (with The Alchemist)

=== Mixtapes ===
- Tsss Kempi (2006, self-published)
- Mixtape 2: Rap 'N Borie (Rap 'N Crack) (2007, TopNotch)
- Mixtape 3.1 (2007, TopNotch)
- Mixtape 3.2: Du Evolutie van 'n Nigga (Tha Evolution of a Nigga) (2009, TopNotch)
- Du Gangsta Tape: It's Official (2010, TopNotch)
- Du Movement (2011, self-published) (with Rasskulz, Crazyshee, Lens and CocoRas, as Gotti Gang)
- DU4 (2017)

=== EP ===
- RockNRolla (2011, self-published)
- TegenK4nker EP (AgainstC4ncer EP) (2011) (Financial gainings made through this EP went to a cancer support foundation.)
- PeterPanBoy EP (2012, self-published)
- PPB2 (2012, self-published)

== Filmography ==
Date	Title
2012	Black Out
2012	Stockholm

== See also ==
- Dutch hip hop
