= VESTROCK =

Annual music festival in Hulst, Netherlands

- Genre: Alternative music, dance music, electronic music, hip hop, heavy metal, indie music, punk
- Dates: First weekend of June
- Locations: Hulst, Netherlands
- Years active: 2010–present
- Founders: Gino Baart
- Website: vestrock.nl

VESTROCK is a festival in Hulst, in the Dutch province of Zeeland, which has been organized since 2010. The festival focuses primarily on alternative music, dance, theater and education and is themed Mixing Music, Art & Science. The festival was nominated ten times for a European Festival Award and is in the top 10 of best European Boutique Festivals.

The festival's name derives from vest, a Dutch word meaning defensive wall; Hulst is a medieval walled city.

== History ==
=== 2019 ===
Visitors: 27.500, Art Works: Just Dimi, Graffiti for You, Windmill park, Tuig Tattoo Weather: Sunny, Vr: 22 °C, Za: 26 °C, Zo 31 °C.

| | MAIN STAGE | TENT | THE CHAPEL | BASILICA | FESTIVALGROUND |
|---|---|---|---|---|---|
| Friday 31 May | Kaiser Chiefs; Triggerfinger; Bizzey; Rondé; Black Honey; Nona; Risky Roads | King Kong Company; Sophie Francis; Joost; De Kraaien; Merol; The Boney King of Nowhere | Jrd; Pink Oculus; Heads & Drive Like Maria; She Drew the Gun; T!im Ned; Morrissey & Marshall; Hermitage Green; Anemone; Dj Nikki | | |
| Saturday 1 June | Nervo; Nothing But Thieves; White Lies; Frans Bauer; Navarone; Davina Michelle; De Hobbyisten | Mental Theo; Memphis Maniacs; Sons; Donnie; Moncrieff; Fata Boom | Blaas of Glory; Fangclub; Evil Invaders; From Inside; Broken Witt Rebels; The Wood Burning Savages; Aad; VESTROCK UNIVERSITY; Jasper van der Veen; Prof. Jaap den Doelder; Helga van Leur; Prof. Jan Baetens | Frans Bauer; Broken Witt Rebels; Morrissey & Marshall; Moncrieff | Graffiti for You; Tuig Tattoo |
| Sunday 2 June | Stuk; Nielson; Gers Pardoel; Magic Unlimited; Sterre Koning; Sesamstraat | Rave van Fortuin; Famke Louise; Stafania; Royalistiq; Jurassic Revenge | Isabel Provoost; Herman Brood Academie; Meneer Monster over een kleine mol Sesamstraat | | Love2Dance; Schminkfeest; Graffiti for You; Tuig Tattoo |

=== 2018 ===
Visitors: 25.000, Art Works: Just Dimi, Graffiti for You, Tuig Tattoo Weather: Cloudy with some rain & Sunny, Vr: 21 °C, Za: 23 °C, Zo 25 °C.

| | MAIN STAGE | TENT | THE CHAPEL | THE BREWERY | FESTIVALGROUND |
|---|---|---|---|---|---|
| Friday 1 June | Tom Odell; Rowwen heze Johan; Equal Idiots; Fangclub | Dr. Lektroluv; Lydmor; Green Lizard; Jacin Trill; Zero One Eighteen | Paceshifters; October Drift; HamSandwich; Bartek; Ten Years Today; Curt; Altobelli | White; Joep Beving; Jack Ladder; Matt Woods; Otherkin | |
| Saturday 2 June | Kraantje Pappie; My Baby; Blaudzun; Millionaire; Michelle David & The Gospel Sessions; De Likt; Josylvio; Velosso | Therapy? Goe vur in den Otto; Coasts; Big Bat; Black Foxxes; Cronin; The Lve | JRD; Curbi; Fleddy Melculy; JRD; Sunstack Jones; Powder for Pigeons; VESTROCK UNIVERSITY; Paul Haenen; Prof. Ortwin de Graef; Prof. Christophe Stove; Drs. Liese Exelmans | Michelle David & The Gospel Sessions; Cronin; The Lve; Sunstack Jones; Alex Hedley; Black Foxxes | De Poëzie Escribano; White; Morrissey & Marshall |
| Sunday 3 June | Stuk; Bizzey; Lil Kleine; Vinchenzo; Fource; Brandweerman Sam Live | Rave van Fortuin; Supergaande; Djamilla; Mylene & Rosanne; 4Life | DJ T-Go; Lanuijt; Djamilla; Eric Provoost; Herman Brood Academie; Meneer Monster speelt de Gruffalo | | Love2Dance; Fiets je Schilderij; Schminkfeest; Thomas Neelemans; De Poëzie Escribano |

=== 2017 ===
Visitors: 25.000, Art Works: Just Dimi, Weather: Sunny, Vr: 21 °C, Za: 21 °C, Zo 21 °C.

| | MAIN STAGE | TENT | THE CHAPEL | BASILICA | FESTIVALGROUND / CITY |
|---|---|---|---|---|---|
| Friday 2 June | Jett Rebel; Racoon; Twin Atlantic; Drive Like Maria; De Wolff; Femke Bun | Kris Kross Amsterdam; Mike Williams; Warhaus; SMIB; Drummakid | Blaas of Glory; Otherkin; The Graveltones; Matt Woods; Whispering Sons; Swedish Death Candy; Cardiax | White; Joep Beving; Jack Ladder; Matt Woods; Otherkin | De Poëzie Escribano; White; Raglans |
| Saturday 3 June | Biffy Clyro; Rival Sons; The Common Linnets; Danny Vera; Kraantje Pappie; DAAN; Warhola; Hunterstreet | King Kong Company; Maxi Jazz (Faithless); Sevn Alias; Coely; Eefje de Visser; Palace Winter; Close Talker | Merdan Taplak Orkestar; Hare Squead; White; The Sherlocks; Raglans; Morrissey & Marshall; VESTROCK UNIVERSITY; Maxi Jazz; Dimitri Verhulst; Patrick Laureij; Dr. Pieter Thyssen; Prof. Karel van Acoleyen; Prof. Katrien Kolenberg | Close Talker; DAAN; Bill Ryder Jones; Palace Winter; Raglans; Morrissey & Marshall; Low Land Home; The Sherlocks | De Poëzie Escribano; White; Morrissey & Marshall |
| Sunday 4 June | Broederliefde; Kevin; Boef; TP4Y; Disney's Channel Just Like Me; Kinderen voor Kinderen | Rondé; The Galaxy; Stuk TV; Team Dylan Haegens; Sarah & Julia ft. Nigel Sean; Thomas de Stoomlocomotief | Wipneus en Pim; Workshops Herman Brood Academie; De Droomfabriek | | Love2Dance; Lego experience Fiets je Schilderij; Schminkfeest; Thomas Neelemans; De Poëzie Escribano |

=== 2016 ===
Visitors: 25.000, Art Works: St. Joost VJ's, Weather: Cloudy, Vr: 20 °C, Za: 22 °C, Zo 27 °C.

| | MAIN STAGE | TENT | THE CHAPEL | BASILICA | FESTIVAL GROUND |
|---|---|---|---|---|---|
| Friday 3 June | Bingo Players; Kensington; The Boxer Rebellion; My Baby; The Academic; Reptilians | King Kong Company; John Coffey; SBMG; Broederliefde; Woodie Smalls | Flying Horseman; Textures; Evil Invaders; Black Honey; Cronin; Dorian & The Grays | The Academic; Cronin | St. Joost VJ's; Coco Popshow |
| Saturday 4 June | Modestep; De Staat; Typhoon; The Van Jets; Echotape; K's Choice; All Tvvins; Indian Askin; Orange Fox | T.Raumschmiere; De Likt; Bougenvilla; Paceshifters; Compact Disk Dummies; Bokoesam; Douglas Firs; Mickey V | Blaas of Glory; Haty Haty; Faces on TV; CUT_; Max Jury; Peer; Lebbis; Valerie Dewaelheyns; Hetty Helsmoortel | K's Choice; The Van Jets; Paceshifters; Max Jury | St. Joost VJ's; Coco Popshow |
| Sunday 5 June | Pep & Rash; Lil' Kleine; B-Brave; Magic Unlimited; K3; Buurman & Buurman | Brace; Dylan Haegens; Allessandro; Reptile Academy with Sterrin & Ro; Koning Lear | Blaas of Glory kids BOGfest; Santo Rex; Workshops Music with Herman Brood Academy | | Photobooth; Princesses; Make-up fest Workshop make your own button |

=== 2015 ===
Visitors: 21.000, Art Works: Jochem "Srek" Cats, Sjors "Maedist" Kouthoofd, Tobias "Klash" Beacker Hoff, Daxx, Weather: Sunny, Vr: 33 °C, Za: 23 °C, Zo 25 °C.

| | JUPILER STAGE | ZEELAND STAGE | SILENT STAGE | VESTROCK UNIVERSITY | THE LIVING | DE BASILIEK | FESTIVAL GROUND |
|---|---|---|---|---|---|---|---|
| Friday 5 June | Showtek; Drive Like Maria; Dotan; Raglans; Bombay (band); Oorgasme | Arsenal (band); Dotan; Batmobile (band); Mr. Polska | Mental Theo; Darkraver; Dirtcaps; Nobody Beats The Drum; T & Sugah; Funkstarz; DJ Elroy | ... | Monster Youth; Maaike Ouboter; Echotape; Black Horse Society; Herman Brock Jr. | Drive Like Maria; Raglans; Black Horse Society | Street Art Experience; Tuig Tattooshop; Barber shop |
| Saturday 6 June | Don Diablo; Therapy? Lonely the Brave; Giant Sand; Kovacs; Navarone; My dog is radioactive | Anouk; Zornik; Douwe Bob; Fatherson; Tourist LeMC; Willow | Goe vur in den otto Soundsystem; Redondo; Pep & Rash; Mason; Jrd; Banganagangbangers | Guido Weijers; Bobbi Eden; Kees Moeliker; Dr. Valerie Dewaelheyns; Jochem Cats; Boswachter Arjan | Blaas of Glory; Paceshifters; Helsinki; Tout Va Bien; The Pheromones; Pollyanna; Lookapony | Therapy? Fatherson; Echotape; Helsinki | Street Art Experience; Tuig Tattooshop; Barber shop Graffiti workshops |
| Sunday 7 June | Ronnie Flex; Yes-r; Sarah & Julia; Brandweerman Sam | Nielson; MainStreet; Kinderen voor Kinderen | Erik Abores; Dance workshop Moves; Moves Dance Demo | Freek Vonk; Dr. Leen van Campenhout (Eat Bugs); Theater Hutsepot; Timothy van Damme; Robinson Crusoe | Workshops Muziek Herman Brood Academie | Douwe Bob | Street Art Experience; Tuig Tattooshop; Brandweer; Flashmob Dansschool Anneke Hamelink |

=== 2014 ===
Visitors: 17.500, Art Works: Daxx, Dimitri Sponselee, Weather: Sunny, Vr: 27.2 °C, Za: 29.6 °C, Zo 28.1 °C.

| | JUPILER STAGE | SENA STAGE | SILENT STAGE | VESTROCK UNIVERSITY | CLUB ACOUSTIC | FESTIVAL GROUND |
|---|---|---|---|---|---|---|
| Sunday 8 June | White Lies; Blaudzun; VESTROCK Allstars; Lonely The Brave; Marble Sounds; Danny Vera | DAAN; Thomas Azier; De Kraaien; Mintzkov; Psycho 44; De Hobbyisten | Kid Noize; Mark with a K Regain; Clock Kid; Fatal Inc. Bodyspasm; DJ Sandstorm; DJ Gunloadz; Supra Naturals | Ronald Giphart; Kamagurka | Jennah Bell; Bent van Looy; Eveline Vroonland; Going Dutch; The Shore Cries Attic; Dyl'N | Crappydog |
| Saturday 7 June | Limp Bizkit; Di-Rect; Intergalactic Lovers; Peter Pan Speedrock; Reptile Youth; Town of Saints; Clear Clamour | The Opposites; De Staat; Oorgasme; Bass Kleph; Taymir; Horses on Fire | Raving George; Syndaesia; Ronnie Flex; Digitzz; DJ Extinse | Prof. Johan Braeckman (UGent); Prof. Vincent Icke (Universiteit Leiden); Prof.Jan Tytgat(KU Leuven); Herman Brusselmans; Fusion Roadshow (TU/e) | I Will, I Swear; Freedman; Lili Grace; Doctor Millar; Tremble; Wolf in Loveland | |
| Friday 6 June | Yellow Claw; Jan Smit; Hans Klok; Sarah & Julia | Ali B B-Brave; Allesandro; Bob de Bouwer | Mickey V | Soufiane Touzani; Masterclass Streetdance; Hans Klok; Professor Loep; Meet & Greet Bob de Bouwer & Wendy; Fusion Roadshow (TU/e) | Workshops Muziek | Full Stop Acrobatics; Kapitein Kosto |

=== 2013 ===
Visitors: 12.500 (sold out), Art Works: Georges Cuvillier, Upgrade de Wereld, Weather: Cloudy, Vr: 17.2 °C, Za: 13.6 °C.

| | JUPILER STAGE | SENA STAGE | SILENT STAGE | VESTROCK UNIVERSITY | CLUB ACOUSTIC | FESTIVAL GROUND |
|---|---|---|---|---|---|---|
| Saturday 1 June | Goose; Black Box Revelation; Kensington; Hooverphonic with Orchestra; James Walsh (Starsailor); Carice van Houten; De Jeugd van Tegenwoordig; The Good, The Bad & Bart | Kosheen; Drive Like Maria; The Van Jets; Guild of Stags; Ewert and The Two Dragons; Daily Bread; The Horse Company | Dutch resistance Murdock; Oorgasme; Hermanos Inglesos; Sam de Bruyn; Coely; Fatal Inc. DYM | Gili (mentalist); Prof. Willy Verstraete (UGent); Herman Brusselmans; Prof. Kevin Verstrepen (KU Leuven); Klaas van der Eerden; Dr. Thijs van der Graaf (UGent) | JB Meijers; Matthew Caws (Nada Surf); Peter Doran; Mark lotterman The Horse Company (Surprise act); Steady New Sounds; Geert & The Chiefs; Jimmy Dumbbell | |
| Friday 31 May | Gers Pardoel; MainStreet; Nielson; Lisa, Amy & Shelley; Smash | The Partysquad ft. Jayh; Ralf Mackenbach; Dora the Explorer & Diego; Paper Planes | Party on Tour | Kidzmove Masterclass; Mad Science II; Mad Science I Freek Vonk; André Kuipers; Rudy Buijsrogge | | Action Skate Show |

=== 2012 ===
Visitors: 8500 (sold out), Art Works: Gert_39, Willem Boel, Weather: Partly Cloudy, Vr: 19.6 °C, Za: 18.2 °C.

| | MAIN STAGE | Cortonville STAGE | SILENT STAGE | VESTROCK UNIVERSITY | FESTIVAL GROUND |
|---|---|---|---|---|---|
| Saturday 2 June | The Subs; Go Back to the Zoo; Arid; Heideroosjes; School is Cool; Kraantje Pappie; Gork A27 | Addicted Kru Sound (AKS); Blaudzun; Intergalactic Lovers; Textures; Merdan Taplak; Sherman; Gers Pardoel; Stunned Ziggy | Dutch resistance DJ Sandstorm; Ego Troopers; Oorgasme; Vialo Rivaldo; DJ Elroj; Compact Disk Dummies; Saint Helena Dove | Midas Dekkers; Prof. Koen Martens (UGent); Dr. W. Brandernburg (WUR); Prof. Ad van Wijk (TU Delft); Prof. Andre Faaij (Universiteit Utrecht); Prof. Dirk Verschuren (UGent) | |
| Friday 1 June | Ali B Nick & Simon; Magic Unlimited; Piet Piraat; Smash | Moves Streetdance; Chaima; Keet! Flip5 | Party on Tour | Workshops Science/DJ/Rap; Materialenverhalen (Technopolis (Mechelen)); Nick & Simon; Geniaal Chemicaal (Technopolis (Mechelen)); Freek Vonk; Flip5 | Cie Entre-Sonore |

=== 2011 ===
Visitors: 3500 (sold out), Art Works: Georges Cuvillier, Egied Simons, Denis Oudendijk, Walt Van Beek, Weather: Sunny, 29.9 °C.

| | MAIN STAGE | KINKFM STAGE | SILENT STAGE | VESTROCK UNIVERSITY | FESTIVAL GROUND |
|---|---|---|---|---|---|
| Saturday, 4 June | Shameboy; Triggerfinger (band); Goose; Racoon; Das Pop; Mintzkov; Suarez; Eva Auad; Gogo Yubari | DJ Sandstorm; Krach (band); Noblesse; Ilanois; Blaas of Glory; Heist; Volt Violin; Capital Sentimental | Oorgasme; The Edukatorz; Jimmy Fingers; Deafman; Bekpek; Paulo DC; F*ck my Eardrums; Class hero Miss Meliciou; JRD | Masterclass Triggerfinger (band); Steven Vromman; Theo Jansen; Prof. Johan Braeckman (UGent); Prof. Arnold van Huis(WUR); Prof. Marc van Montagu (UGent) | Blaas of Glory |

=== 2010 ===
Visitors: 2500 (sold out), Art Works: Rene van Corven, Lieven Standaert, Gilberto Esparza, Will Beckers, Jef Faes, Raphael Opstaele, Frank F. Castelyns, Francesco Fransera, Jason van der Woude, Weather: Sunny, 27.5 °C.

| | MAIN STAGE | PAZ STAGE |
|---|---|---|
| Saturday, 5 June | Dr Lektroluv; Moke; Drive Like Maria; Customs; Waxdolls; Freaky Age; Oorgasme; Silence is Sexy; Absynthe Minded; Lola Kite; JRD; Bluem | El Gusto?! Designerbabies; Marsha; Audiofungus; Jay Minor & The Early Birds; Vota Fonzie |

=== Trivia ===
- Since 2011, an educational program, with a focus on sustainability, was added to the program, called VESTROCK UNIVERSITY. Scientists and prominent speakers give lectures on sustainability, climate change and topical themes as the silent disco concept. VESTROCK UNIVERSITY was made possible by the support of Ghent, Duvel and DELTA Zealand fund.
- Since 2012, the festival was expanded to include a festival for children under the name VESTROCK JUNIOR. On this day no alcoholic beverages are allowed.
- Each year, hundreds of volunteers have helped make VESTROCK possible.
- In 2013, CLUB ACOUSTIC, an intimate acoustic stage for singer-songwriters, was added to the festival.
- In 2014, a 3rd festival and a festival site was added. The unique specialty VEST ROCK BLOND ROCK VEST was presented which was the first Dutch Festival with its own specialty!
- In 2015, CLUB ACOUSTIC was replaced by THE LIVING, a small, cozy "living room" stage. In St. Willibrordusbasiliek a new 5th stage was achieved with only acoustic performances in an intimate setting.
- In 2016, THE LIVING was replaced by THE CHAPEL, a fabulous, wooden church with more space.
- In 2017 the TENT stage got bigger and the VESTWALK was added to the program.
- In 2018 The BREWERY stage (where VESTROCK BLOND is born) was added to the program.
- In 2019 CANAL BOAT SESSIONS and a special program for senior citizens in the Basilica were added to the program.
