= The Team (TV series) =

European crime drama television series

- Title screen of The Team
- Genre: Crime drama
- Starring: Lars Mikkelsen; Jasmin Gerat; Veerle Baetens
- Composer: Jean-Paul Wall
- Countries of origin: Austria, Belgium, Denmark, Germany, Switzerland
- Original languages: Danish, English, Dutch, French, German, Swedish
- No. of seasons: 2
- No. of episodes: 16

Production
- Running time: 57 minutes
- Production companies: Network Movie Film-und Fernsehproduktion (Germany); Lunanime (Belgium); Nordisk Film (Denmark); Superfilm (Austria); C-films (Switzerland)

Original release
- Network: ZDF (Germany); SRF (German-speaking Switzerland); ORF (Austria); vtm (Flanders, Belgium); DR (Denmark); SVT (Sweden); FOX (Netherlands)
- Release: 22 February 2015

The Team is a 2015 European crime drama television series that first premiered on 22 February 2015 on DR in Denmark. The series follows a number of national police agencies, working through the framework of Europol, to attempt to solve a series of cross-border murders. Among others, the team is primarily headed by Danish homicide detective Harald Bjørn (Lars Mikkelsen), Belgian homicide detective Alicia Verbeek (Veerle Baetens), and German Federal Criminal Police superintendent Jackie Müller (Jasmin Gerat). A second season premiered in 2018 with a different cast. The first season is available via streaming on MHZ and All 4.

== Cast ==
=== First Series ===
- Lars Mikkelsen as Harald Bjørn, chief of the Danish police team
- Jasmin Gerat as Jackie Müller, chief of the German police team
- Veerle Baetens as Alicia Verbeeck, chief of the Belgian police team
- Nicholas Ofczarek as Marius Loukauskis
- Carlos Leal as Jean-Louis Poquelin
- Ida Engvoll as Kit Ekdal, assistant to Harald Bjørn
- Koen De Bouw as Frank Aers, assistant to Alicia Verbeeck
- Miriam Stein as Natascha Stark, assistant to Jackie Müller
- Hilde Van Mieghem as Stéphane Pernel, superior to Alicia Verbeeck
- Alexandra Rapaport as Liv Eriksen, wife of Harald Bjørn
- Filip Peeters as Bruno Koopmann
- Marc Benjamin as Max Ritter, German undercover agent
- Jella Haase as Bianca Loukauskis
- Andreas Pietschmann as Elias Müller, husband of Jackie Müller
- Ole Boisen as Finn Moesgaard, assistant to Harald Bjørn
- Nadeshda Brennicke as Dahlia Loukauskis
- Lisbeth Wulff as Else Hojby, assistant to Harald Bjørn
- Sunnyi Melles as Iris Gabler
- André Hennicke as Rainer Stark
- Line Pillet as Fifi Verbeek

Belgian guest stars include Marijke Pinoy, Line Pillet, Gilda De Bal, Bert Haelvoet, Kim Hertogs, Begir Memeti, Kadèr Gürbüz, Manou Kersting and Joy Anna Thielemans.

=== Second Series ===
As sorted alphabetically:

- Marie Bach Hansen as Nelly Winther
- Lynn Van Royen as Paula Liekens
- Jürgen Vogel as Gregor Veiss
- Fatima Adoum as Mariam Barkiri

== Music ==
The opening theme is a cut of the song "Northern Rd." from the album "Little Heavy Burdens" by Belgian indie rock band Intergalactic Lovers.
