= Greetings & Salutations =

Greetings & Salutations may refer to:

- Greetings & Salutations (Intergalactic Lovers album)
- Greetings & Salutations from Less Than Jake

== See also ==
- Greetings and Salutations, a 1975 big band jazz album
