= Haris Alagic =

- Origin: Eindhoven, Netherlands
- Genres: Pop music; R&B; rock; EDM
- Instruments: Vocals; Guitar
- Years active: 2013–present
- Website: www.instagram.com/harissongs

Haris Alagic professionally known as Haris, is a Dutch singer-songwriter and guitarist of Bosnian descent. He started his career in 2013 by winning the fifth season of Dutch series of the X Factor.

== Career ==
=== X Factor ===
Alagic won the Dutch X Factor with 64% from opponent contestant Adriaan Persons when he was eighteen years old. During the television show, Alagic was being coached by Dutch singer, presenter, actress Angela Groothuizen. As a result of this victory, Alagic won a signing with music label Sony Music. During this collaboration with Sony Music, Alagic released his first singles "Playing with Fire", and "Gold". In 2015, his first EP Bedroom Sessions was being released, which he recorded in his bedroom.

After the beginning of Alagic's career, he has been collaborating with various artists. Alagic has worked together as performing vocalist as well as a songwriter with artists such as Hardwell, Headhunterz, The Voyagers, Oliver Heldens, Ferry Corsten, and Dannic. During this time, Alagic was mostly releasing EDM tracks.

=== 2018–present ===
Later, Alagic went on with songwriting and releasing his own music. In the meantime, the collaboration between the artist and Sony Music ended and begun publishing music with Houston Comma. In 2018, various singles led to his second EP Side Effects. While Alagic continued with releasing singles, it was the collaboration between him and DJ duo Lucas & Steve, starting with the release of "Perfect" in 2019, which brought him back to public attention. The song was adapted and sampled on the a-ha song "Take On Me". Shortly after, Alagic released the single "Shivers" in 2020. Also in 2020, Alagic worked on another release from Lucas & Steve. This time, he co-wrote and performed "Letters", Lucas & Steve's album Letters to Remember.

== Discography ==
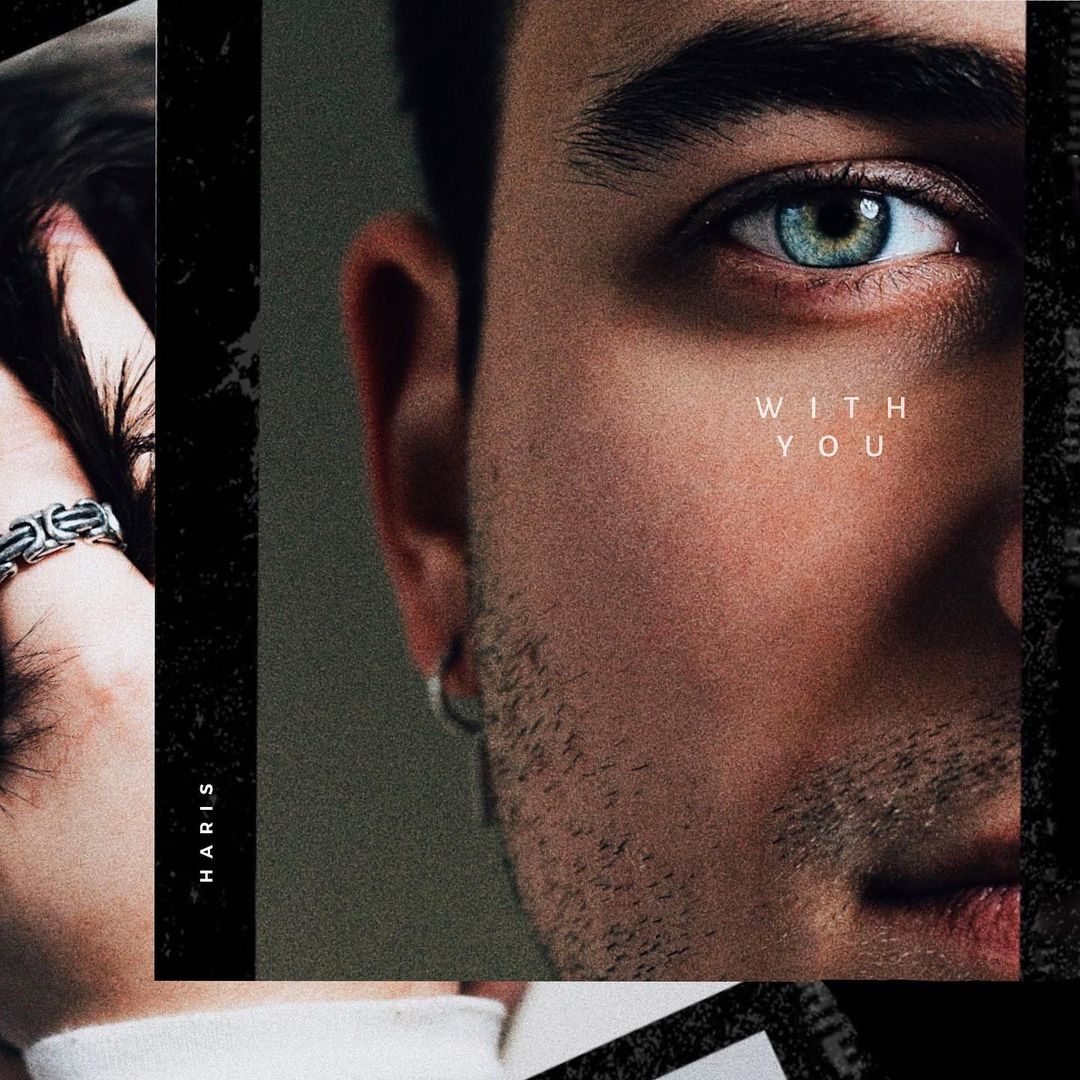
Haris' single 'With You'

=== EPs ===
- 2015: Bedroom EP
- 2018: Side Effects EP
- 2021: Wilted Roses EP
- 2022: Beauty is a mess EP

=== Albums ===
- 2021: Obsession

=== Singles ===
- 2013: "Playing with Fire" - Peaked at #27 on Dutch Top 40, #9 on Dutch Single Top 100
- 2013: "Gold"
- 2020: "Shivers"

=== Featured in ===
- 2019: "Perfect" (Lucas & Steve feat. Haris) - Peaked at #10 on Dutch Top 40 and #28 on Dutch Single Top 100
