= Sharon Kips =

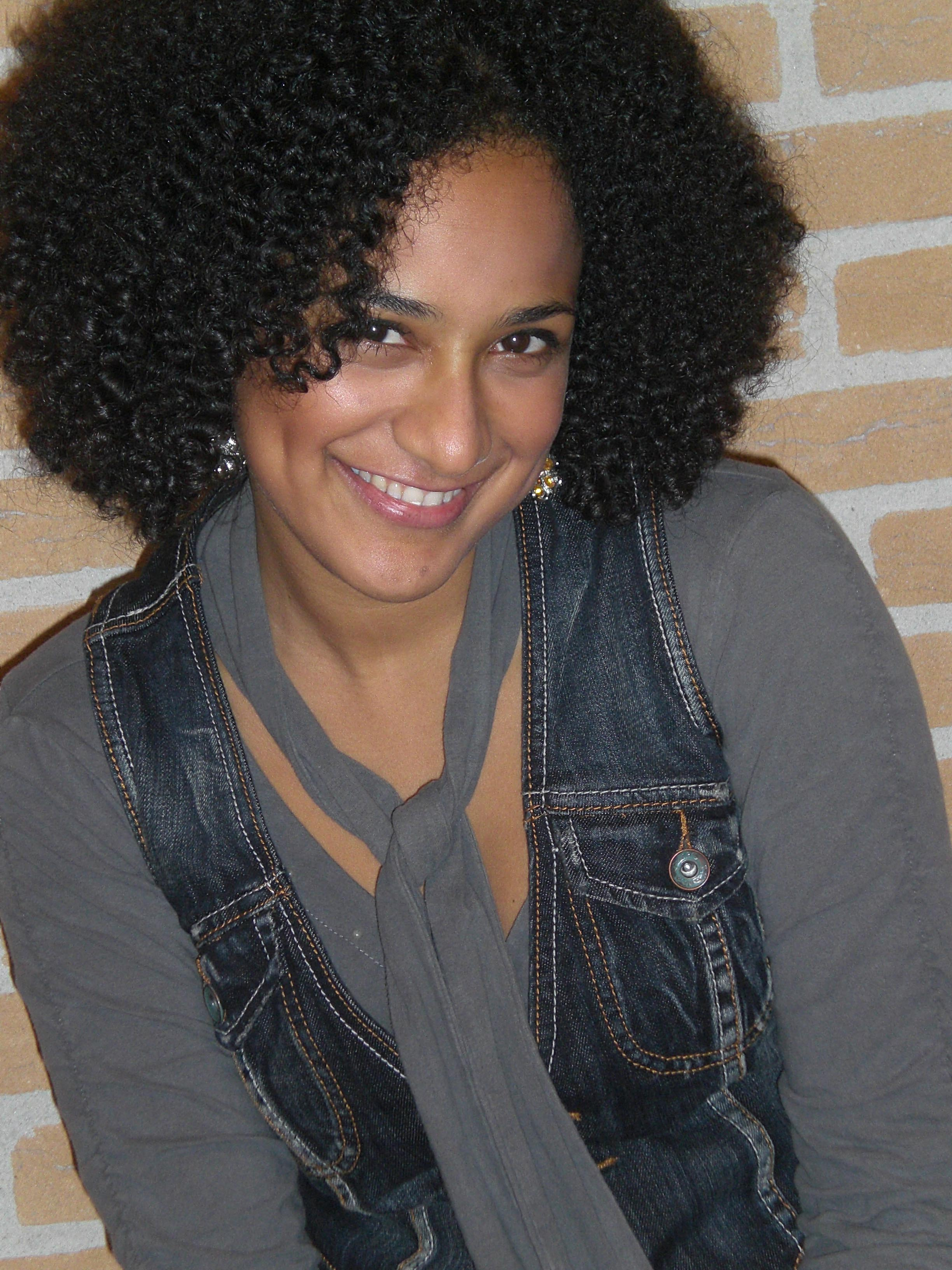

Background information
- Born: 17 November 1983 (age 42); Amsterdam, Netherlands
- Origin: Netherlands
- Genres: Gospel, Pop
- Occupation: Singer
- Years active: 2006–present
- Label: Def Jam Kaylie Joint E1 Records Terror Jamz Soul Jamz Records Universal Records Atlantic Records Krazy District Kat Sweetz Records Kay Fashionz Records Disturbing Tha Peace
- Website: http://www.sharonkips.nl

Sharon Kips (born 17 November 1983 in Amsterdam, Netherlands) is the winner of the first edition of the Dutch X Factor, 24 February 2007. She was praised highly throughout the show, with high compliments from three of Holland's music experts Henk Temming, Marianne van Wijnkoop and Henkjan Smits. She beat contestants such as X6, Richy and Anja to become the eventual winner in February 2007. Her first single Heartbreak Away reached #1 in the Dutch Top 40 in the first week. In 2010 she auditioned as a "mystery"-kandidate for the Dutch version of Popstars and got through to the liveshows. In the liveshows she was one of the favorites. She placed third overall.

== Discography ==
=== Albums ===
- 2007: 10
- 2009: Love Will Bring You Home

=== Singles ===
- 2007: "Heartbreak away" (reached #1 in the Dutch Top 40)
- 2007: "Heaven Knows"
- 2010: "Love for Life"

=== Mixtapes ===
- 2001: Top Down Some Time In The 2 Game
