= Rachel Kramer =

Dutch singer

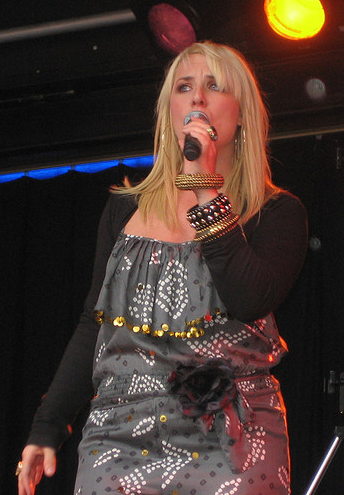

Background information
- Born: 9 August 1980 (age 46); Rotterdam, The Netherlands
- Occupation: Singer
- Instrument: Vocals
- Years active: 2001— present
- Website: www.iamrachelkramer.com

Rachel Kramer (born in Rotterdam on 9 August 1980) is a Dutch singer and the runner-up of the second season of the X Factor in the Netherlands. Her first single was a cover of Rascal Flatts's "What Hurts the Most". Until 2003, Kramer was a member of the Dutch band K-otic.
