= Sophie Francis =

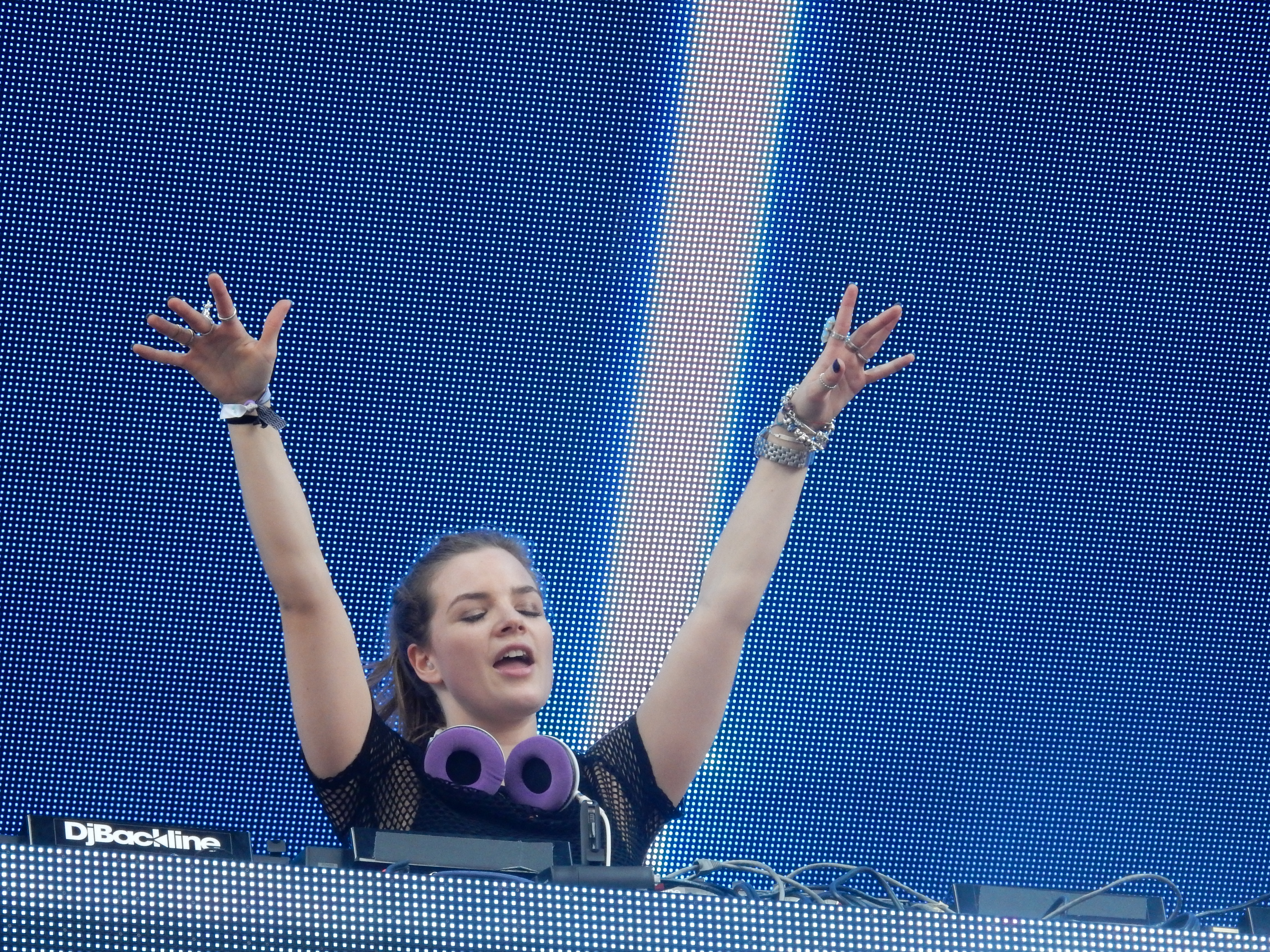
- Sophie Francis at Ultra Music Festival 2017

Background information
- Also known as: Sophie's Choice
- Born: Sophie Fabienne Bongers; December 2, 1998 (age 27); Den Bosch, North Brabant, Netherlands
- Origin: Sint-Oedenrode, North Brabant, Netherlands
- Genres: Electro house; progressive house; EDM; trap; future bass; Dutch house
- Occupations: Musician; DJ; record producer
- Instruments: Digital audio workstation; piano
- Years active: 2014–present
- Labels: Freeway Recordings; Powerhouse Music; Dirty Dutch Music; Spinnin' Records; Smash the House
- Website: sophiefrancismusic.com

Sophie Fabienne Bongers (born December 2, 1998), better known by her stage name Sophie Francis, is a Dutch record producer, DJ and musician.

== Biography ==
=== Early life ===
Sophie Fabienne Bongers was born on December 2, 1998 in Den Bosch, Netherlands. She lived in St Francis Bay, South Africa with her parents for six months a year until they returned to the Netherlands permanently when she was 10, this time moving to Sint-Oedenrode. From an early age, she had an interest in music. By the age of 9, she started playing piano and sang along to many songs. At the age of 14, she was tasked with doing a school project where she would develop a new skill during 9 months, and being so much into the music, she got inspired to do something with it for this project. Besides that, she also wanted to do something with people. When doing research, she found a video of a DJ playing a live set who had a great connection with the crowd. As she loved the vibe and was amazed by how one person can transfer one's energy to an entire crowd with music, she realized that "when you are a DJ, you have this special connection with people, I think that's amazing!". She went to the International School Eindhoven (ISE) in Eindhoven, where she began taking DJ lessons and met new friends who already began producing music. Before graduating from high school in May 2017, she started her music career.

=== Music career ===
==== 2014-2015 ====
Her first residency was at a small bar Het Pumpke in her hometown of Sint-Oedenrode, when she was only 15 years old. Since then, she was regularly invited to perform at various events in the Netherlands. She began her career under the stage name "Sophie's Choice". In the summer of 2015, she signed with Always Management. She also performed at BCM in Mallorca. In October, due to the copyright on the 1982 film of the same name, she changed her stage name to "Sophie Francis" as a tribute to St Francis Bay, a town in South Africa where she grew up. In late November, she was invited to South Africa for a tour, where she performed main-stage at the Ruins Festival in St Francis Bay and the Coco Club in Cape Town, as well as made an appearance on national television. Around that same time, she noticed that John Christian was announcing a new record label that supports new talents. Afterwards, she caught the attention of Christian by sending some demos, and the two began working together to release Francis's music on Christian's record label Freeway Recordings.

==== 2016 ====
On February 29, 2016, she released "Drop of a Dime", her first single on Freeway Recordings, followed by her second single "Up in This", which was described by EDMTunes as "a mainstage-ready banger" that "proves why the likes of Ummet Ozcan and Quintino have already thrown her support". Her third single, "Bad Boy", was released on June 20, and afterwards she released the track "Annihilate" as a free download, which received over 2 million plays on SoundCloud.

During the summer, she also performed main-stage at festivals across the Netherlands and Spain, such as Paellas Universitarias for 35,000 people in Valencia, as well as a concert residency at BCM Mallorca as the "New Discovery" special guest, playing once a week for two months before main guests such as Steve Aoki, Nervo, Vinai and Martin Garrix, with whom she also performed back-to-back.

On September 23, she released her first vocal track "Walls" on Powerhouse Music. The track entered the playlists of Dutch national radio stations such as Radio 538, SLAM! and NPO 3FM, reached the Top 30 on the Dutch Airplay chart, as well as became a Dance Smash on 538 and received 94% of likes from 538 listeners on the item 'Maak 't of kraak 't' (translated: make it or break it). In October, she performed at the Amsterdam Dance Event for the first time, playing in a bus while traveling across Amsterdam, as well as was a guest at Giel on NPO 3FM.

On November 9, she was a guest and performed at Bij Igmar on SLAM!. That same month, she released "Don't Stop" on Chuckie's record label Dirty Dutch Music. In December, she performed at the Glazen Huis in Breda. By the end of 2016, she was an in-demand artist getting booking requests from the United Kingdom, Belgium, France, Germany, the United States, India, China, Vietnam, Japan and the United Arabic Emirates, but balancing the fact that she was still a high school student, working daily to find a balance between her career and her studies.

==== 2017 ====
On January 30, 2017, it was announced that Francis signed a deal with Spinnin' Records, a then-independent Dutch record label, which she said was "a dream coming true". Her first single on the label, "Without You", was released on February 17. She produced the song together with Dutch songwriting duo the Companions, with one of its members, Sasha Rangas providing vocals for the song. The track was very well received and played by artists such as Tiësto, Nicky Romero and Dimitri Vegas & Like Mike and is being played on radio stations worldwide.

She was named on Spotify's "Top 25 Most Influential Artists Under 25" alongside fellow Dutch DJs Martin Garrix, Oliver Heldens, among others. On March 2, 2017, she was a guest and performed at De Avondploeg on Radio 538. Later that month, she performed at the Spinnin' Hotel in Miami during the Winter Music Conference, and on March 25 she performed for the first time at Ultra Music Festival on the "Worldwide" stage.

On April 27, 2017, she performed at AFAS Stadion in Alkmaar during SLAM! Koningsdag 2017. Less than a month later, she released her second single on Spinnin' Records, "Lovedrunk". First announced as an ID track, it was well received by the Chainsmokers, Dimitri Vegas & Like Mike, R3hab and Vinai, among others. The single peaked at number 17 on the DMC Buzz Chart two weeks before release. An official music video for the song was released. A remix pack for the song was released less than three months later, featuring remixes from Olly James, Carta and TV Noise. She had also hosted an episode on the label's radio show Spinnin' Sessions.

On May 27, she performed at the Emporium festival in Nijmegen. Afterwards, she performed at the Amsterdam Arena during the Glamour Health Challenge. Together with Mike Williams, Curbi and Mesto, she also organized benefit concerts for a school in Limburg. In July, she performed at the 2017 edition of the Tomorrowland festival for two days in Belgium. In August, she embarked on her first Asia tour, with plans to hit various Asian countries such as Myanmar, Thailand, China and Indonesia. A month later, she returned to China to perform at Storm Electronic Music Festival in Changsha and Shanghai, before returning to the Netherlands to attend her second ADE, performing three times during the week in Amsterdam.

In October, Francis started her own radio show, named "Beyond Radio", broadcast weekly by Radio FG in France and Belgium and by WolfBytes Radio in the United States. Every episode, lasting one hour, contains mashups, previews and news about her career. On November 10, her single "Get Over It" was released on Dimitri Vegas & Like Mike's label Smash the House, celebrated with a release party at the Veltins-Arena in Gelsenkirchen, Germany.

Her third Asia tour started with a DJ set on board of a cruise ship called "It's the Ship", boarding from Singapore and traveling around various Asian countries. Other stops of the tour included clubs in Shanghai, Ningbo, Jakarta and Tokyo, where she also celebrated her 19th birthday on December 2 before returning to Europe. She ended 2017 with two DJ sets in her former home country, South Africa, playing in Cape Town at Soundscape on December 30 and at Secrets of Summer on New Year's Eve.

==== 2018 ====
On January 26, 2018, Francis released the single "Hearts of Gold" on Spinnin' Records. The singer of the song is Nicole Bus. On the same day, her first official remix is released by Atlantic Records and is the rework of "So What" by Sam Bruno featuring Rockie Fresh. In late February, she played at a charity event in Eindhoven organized by the Rode Kruis, the Dutch Red Cross, giving her contribution to raise €24.000 for children in Haiti. On March 9, a vocal version of "Get Over It" was released on Smash the House featuring the vocals from Canadian singer Laurell. Later same month, she performed at the Spinnin' Hotel in Miami during the 2018 Miami Music Week.

On June 29, her second song featuring the vocals from the Companions' Sasha Rangas, "Stay Up", was released. The song received over 13 million streams. An official music video for the song was released less than two months later. She also played at the Indian Summer Festival in Langedijk. In October, she took up participation in an awareness campaign by Dance4Life, for which she became an ambassador. That same month, she released "Weekend Love" on Spinnin' Records. She also attended the Amsterdam Dance Event in Amsterdam.

==== 2019 ====
Francis started 2019 by releasing the track "True Champion" as a free download followed by "Lose My Mind" on Spinnin' Records. She then released "On My Way", which, according to staff of EDM Joy, "builds on a warm dance rhythm before unleashing exciting vocals and sweet guitar chords, exploding in an anthem-like chorus, full of singalong vibes and feelgood melodics". She also performed at VESTROCK in Hulst. In July, she performed at the Zwarte Cross in the Achterhoek.

In August, Francis started publishing Beyond Fitness vlogs on her YouTube channel, where she and her personal trainer show a set of exercises that can be done either in the gym or out of the house (e.g. on tour). She also released a track inspired by her Beyond Fitness workouts, titled "Six Pack", through Future House Music. Afterwards, she performed at various clubs in Germany such as Bootshaus in Cologne and Docks in Hamburg, as well as at the Amsterdam Dance Event in Amsterdam. In November, she played at the pre-show of Airbeat One in Schwerin alongside Vini Vici, Danny Ávila and Oliver Heldens. A month later, she was a guest and played a set in an episode of Nicky Romero's podcast "Protocol Radio".

==== 2020-present ====
In 2020, Francis released two singles: "Roll Up" and "A-Freak-A". In 2022, she collaborated with Lorena Medina and the Inner Kids for the official song of La Vuelta 22, "C'mon C'mon".

== Awards and nominations ==
=== 2017 ===
- Billboard: "Top 5 Female Performances"
- Spotify: "Top 25 Most Influential Artists Under 25"

== Discography ==
=== Charting singles ===
Title	Year	Peak chart positions					Album
Title	Year	NLD Single Tip	NLD Tipparade	BEL (Fl)	BEL (Wa)	SWE	Album
"Walls"	2016	20	7	17	—	—	Non-album singles
"Without You"	2017	—	—	—^{[A]}	—^{[B]}	—	Non-album singles
"Hearts of Gold" (featuring Laurell)	2018	—	—	—^{[C]}	—	—	Non-album singles
"Stay Up"	2018	—	—	—	—	57	Non-album singles
"—" denotes a recording that did not chart or was not released in that territory.

=== Singles ===
- 29-02-2016: "Drop of a Dime" [Freeway Recordings]
- 11-04-2016: "Up in This" [Freeway Recordings]
- 30-05-2016: "Bad Boy" [Freeway Recordings]
- 20-06-2016: "Annihilate" [FREE]
- 26-09-2016: "Walls" [Powerhouse Music]
- 18-11-2016: "Don't Stop" [Dirty Dutch Music]
- 17-02-2017: "Without You" [Spinnin' Records]
- 26-05-2017: "Lovedrunk" [Spinnin' Records]
- 10-11-2017: "Get Over It" [Smash the House]
- 26-01-2018: "Hearts of Gold" [Spinnin' Records]
- 09-03-2018: "Get Over It" (featuring Laurell) [Smash the House]
- 30-06-2018: "Stay Up" [Spinnin' Records]
- 05-10-2018: "Weekend Love" [Spinnin' Records]
- 28-02-2019: "True Champion" [FREE]
- 29-03-2019: "Lose My Mind" [Spinnin' Records]
- 10-05-2019: "On My Way" [Spinnin' Records]
- 04-10-2019: "Six Pack" [Future House Music]
- 02-21-2020: "Roll Up" [Heldeep Records]
- 04-27-2020: "A-Freak-A" [Spinnin' Records]
- 26-03-2021: "Talk Like That" (featuring I AML) [Deux Trois]
- 16-04-2021: "I Push My Body" [Show Me the Honey]
- 23-04-2021: "Drop That Ass" [Show Me the Honey]
- 30-04-2021: "Running Wild" [Show Me the Honey]
- 07-05-2021: "Feel Your Energy" [Show Me the Honey]
- 14-05-2021: "Break a Sweat" [Show Me the Honey]
- 21-05-2021: "Summer Body" [Show Me the Honey]
- 28-05-2021: "Countdown" [Show Me the Honey]
- 26-11-2021: "I Miss Missing You" [Show Me the Honey]
- 17-12-2021: "Dance with Me" (with Makasi) [Generation Smash]
- 21-01-2022: "Famous" (featuring CVBZ) [Spinnin' Records]
- 05-08-2022: "C'mon C'mon" (with Lorena Medina and the Inner Kids) [Show Me the Honey]

=== Remixes ===
- 26-01-2018: Sam Bruno featuring Rockie Fresh - So What (Sophie Francis Remix) [Atlantic Records]
- 14-09-2018: Barrett Wilbert Weed and Original Broadway Cast of Mean Girls - I'd Rather Be Me (Sophie Francis Remix) [Mean Girls Broadway, LLC]

== Notes ==
- A "Without You" did not enter the Ultratop 50, but peaked at number 13 on the Flemish Dance Bubbling Under chart.
- B "Without You" did not enter the Ultratop 50, but peaked at number 19 on the Walloon Dance Bubbling Under chart.
- C "Get Over It" did not enter the Ultratop 50, but peaked on the Flemish Ultratip chart.
