= X Factor (Dutch TV series) =

- Also known as: X Factor Dutch
- Created by: Simon Cowell
- Presented by: Wendy van Dijk; Martijn Krabbé
- Starring: Sharon Kips; Lisa Hordijk (winners)
- Judges: Gordon Heuckeroth; Angela Groothuizen; Ali Bouali; Candy Dulfer; Henkjan Smits; Marianne van Wijnkoop; Henk Temming; Eric van Tijn; Stacey Rookhuizen
- Voices of: Jeroen Nieuwenhuize
- Country of origin: Netherlands
- Original language: Dutch
- No. of seasons: 5
- No. of episodes: 35

Production
- Producers: FremantleMedia, Syco
- Production location: Studio 22, Mediapark
- Running time: 60–120mins (inc. adverts)

Original release
- Network: RTL 4
- Release: October 28, 2006 – July 5, 2013

X Factor is a Dutch television music talent show contested by aspiring pop singers drawn from public auditions. It was shown Friday evenings on the RTL 4 Network in the Netherlands. The show aired between 2006 and 2013 and was produced by Blue Circle. The "X Factor" of the title refers to the undefinable "something" that makes for star quality.

X Factor replaced the highly successful Idols, which was pulled from television after the third and fourth seasons.

In the initial televised audition phase of the show, contestants sang in front of the X Factor judges in the hope of getting through to the "boot camp". After a further selection process, the judges were each given a category to mentor and the chosen finalists then progress to the second phase of the competition in which the public vote on live performances. Judges have included pop singer and television host Gordon Heuckeroth, former Dolly Dots member Angela Groothuizen, Rapper Ali Bouali, and Alto saxophonist Candy Dulfer.

The first season of X Factor began in October 2006 and ran to February 2007. It was not as popular as Idols, and was won by Sharon Kips. The second season, running from January to May 2009, was more successful. It was won by Lisa Hordijk. The third season was won by Jaap van Reesema, Rochelle Perts won the fourth season, and the fifth season was won by Haris Alagic.

== Format ==
The show was primarily concerned with identifying singing talent, through appearance, personality, stage presence and dance routines are also an important element of many performances. The single most important attribute that the judges were seeking, however, was the ability to appeal to a mass market of pop fans.

For the first season, the competition was split into three categories: Solo Singers aged 15–25, Solo Singers aged 26 and over, and Vocal Groups (including duos). After the first season, the 15 to 25 category was split into separate male and female sections, making four categories in all: 15–25 males ("Boys"), 15–25 females ("Girls"), Over 26s, and Groups.

There were five stages to the X Factor competition:

- Stage 1: Producers' auditions (these auditions decide who will sing in front of the judges)
- Stage 2: Judges' auditions
- Stage 3: X Campus
- Stage 4: Visits to judges' houses
- Stage 5: Live shows (finals)

== Season summary ==
To date, five seasons have been broadcast, as summarised below.

Contestant in "Henkjan Smits"
Contestant in "Marianne van Wijnkoop"
Contestant in "Henk Temming"
Contestant in "Eric van Tijn"
Contestant in "Gordon Heuckeroth"
Contestant in "Angela Groothuizen"
Contestant in "Stacey Rookhuizen"
Contestant in "Ali B"
Contestant in "Candy Dulfer"

| Season | Start | Finish | Winner | Runner-up | Other finalist(s) | Winning Mentor | Presenter(s) | Main judges | | | | Guest judges |
| Season | Start | Finish | Winner | Runner-up | Other finalist(s) | Winning Mentor | Presenter(s) | 1 | 2 | 3 | 4 | Guest judges |
|---|---|---|---|---|---|---|---|---|---|---|---|---|
| 1 | 28 Oct 2006 | 24 Feb 2007 | Sharon Kips; 16–24s | Richy Brown; 16–24s | X6; Groups | Henkjan Smits | Wendy van Dijk | Henkjan Smits | Marianne van Wijnkoop | Henk Temming | | |
| 2 | 16 Jan 2009 | 9 May 2009 | Lisa Hordijk; Girls | Rachel Kramer; Over 25s | Jamal Bijnoe; Boys | Gordon Heuckeroth | Wendy van Dijk; Martijn Krabbé | Eric van Tijn | Stacey Rookhuizen | Angela Groothuizen | Gordon Heuckeroth | |
| 3 | 5 Feb 2010 | 29 May 2010 | Jaap van Reesema; Boys | Maaike Vos; Girls | Kelvin Muïs; Boys | Angela Groothuizen | Wendy van Dijk; Martijn Krabbé | Eric van Tijn | Stacey Rookhuizen | Angela Groothuizen | Gordon Heuckeroth | Edsilia Rombley (Show 7) |
| 3 | 5 Feb 2010 | 29 May 2010 | Jaap van Reesema; Boys | Maaike Vos; Girls | Dony Vernianto; Over 25s | Angela Groothuizen | Wendy van Dijk; Martijn Krabbé | Eric van Tijn | Stacey Rookhuizen | Angela Groothuizen | Gordon Heuckeroth | Edsilia Rombley (Show 7) |
| 4 | 28 Jan 2011 | 10 Jun 2011 | Rochelle Perts; Girls | Adlicious; Groups | Rolf Wienk; Boys | Eric van Tijn | Wendy van Dijk; Martijn Krabbé | Eric van Tijn | Stacey Rookhuizen | Angela Groothuizen | Gordon Heuckeroth | Ruud de Wild (Show 8) |
| 4 | 28 Jan 2011 | 10 Jun 2011 | Rochelle Perts; Girls | Adlicious; Groups | Sim'Ran; Groups | Eric van Tijn | Wendy van Dijk; Martijn Krabbé | Eric van Tijn | Stacey Rookhuizen | Angela Groothuizen | Gordon Heuckeroth | Ruud de Wild (Show 8) |
| 5 | 19 Apr 2013 | 5 Jul 2013 | Haris Alagic; Boys | Adriaan Persons; Boys | B-Brave; Groups | Angela Groothuizen | Martijn Krabbé | Ali B | Candy Dulfer | Angela Groothuizen | Gordon Heuckeroth | |

== Judges' categories and their contestants ==
In each season, each judge was allocated a category to mentor and chose a small number of acts to progress to the live finals. This table shows, for each series, which category each judge was allocated and which acts he or she put through to the live finals.

Key:

– Winning judge/category. Winners are in bold.

| Season | Henkjan Smits | Marianne van Wijnkoop | Henk Temming | N/A |
|---|---|---|---|---|
| **One** | **15-25s** **Sharon Kips**; Richy Brown; Christian Link | **Groups**; X6; Hearts; Groovin' Sound | **Over 26s** Anja Wessels; Dorine Bijl; Melanie Mackintosh; Ruben Thurnim | N/A |
| Season | Eric van Tijn | Stacey Rookhuizen | Angela Groothuizen | Gordon Heuckeroth |
| **Two** | **Groups**; Whatever; Rev 'n Ros; K.L.E.M. | **Boys**; Jamal Bijnoe; Luigiano Paals; Laurens Wauters | **Over 26s** Rachel Kramer; Roan Hamminga; Irma Derby | **Girls**; **Lisa Hordijk**; Hester Kootstra; Jennifer Terwel |
| **Three** | **Over 26s** Dony Vernianto; Sarina Kuipers; Janna van den Broek | **Girls**; Maaike Vos; Sumera Espinel; Daniëlle Penning | **Boys**; **Jaap van Reesema**; Kelvin Muïs; Mathijs Rumping | **Groups**; BadBoyz; 4Granted; Fierce |
| **Four** | **Girls**; **Rochelle Perts**; Jessica Mougin; Tania Christopher | **Over 26s** Pyke Pos; Ed Ruyer; Jantine Mak | **Groups**; Adlicious; Sim'Ran; Sway | **Boys**; Rolf Wienk; Tim Suyderhoud; Jesse Zwaan |
| Series | Ali Bouali | Candy Dulfer | Angela Groothuizen | Gordon Heuckeroth |
| **Five** | **Girls**; Milou van Egmond; Clarissa Alberg | **Over 26s** Astrid Tan; Brown Hill | **Boys**; **Haris Alagic**; Adriaan Persons | **Groups**; B-Brave; Orpheus |

== Seasons ==
=== X Factor 1 (2007) ===
Colour key:

| – | Act received the most public votes |
| – | A finalist who was in the Bottom 2 and had to sing again in the sing-off |
| – | The finalist who received the fewest votes and therefore was eliminated immediately (no sing-off) |

| | Week 1 | Week 2 | Week 3 | Week 4 | Week 5 | Week 6 | Week 7 | Week 8 | Week 9 |
|---|---|---|---|---|---|---|---|---|---|
| Sharon Kips | 2nd 15.13% | 1st 19.81% | 2nd 17.24% | 2nd 19.56% | 1st 31.79% | 1st 24.53% | 1st 35.03% | 1st 44.02% | Winner; 75% |
| Richy Brown | 3rd 12.21% | 4th 10.83% | 3rd 12.91% | 3rd 13.91% | 3rd 16.07% | 2nd 24.34% | 2nd 31.04% | 2nd 30.68% | Runner-up; 25% |
| X6 | 4th 10.81% | 3rd 15.24% | 5th 10.75% | 4th 13.31% | 2nd 18.94% | 4th 16.32% | 3rd 21.14% | 3rd 25.33% | Eliminated (Week 8) |
| Anja Wessels | 6th 8.83% | 6th 8.82% | 6th 9.55% | 6th 7.53% | 4th 14.97% | 3rd 19.58% | 4th 12.79% | Eliminated (Week 7) | |
| Christian Link | 9th 5.94% | 7th 7.38% | 4th 11.56% | 5th 9.91% | 6th 6.48% | 5th 15.23% | Eliminated (Week 6) | | |
| Dorine Bijl | 1st 20.73% | 2nd 17.00% | 1st 19.59% | 1st 31.30% | 5th 11.75% | Eliminated (Week 5) | | | |
| Hearts | 5th 8.93% | 5th 10.25% | 8th 8.84% | 7th 4.48% | Eliminated (Week 4) | | | | |
| Melanie Mackintosh | 8th 6.22% | 9th 3.81% | 7th 9.16% | Eliminated (Week 3) | | | | | |
| Ruben Thurnim | 7th 7.53% | 8th 3.81% | Eliminated (Week 2) | | | | | | |
| Groovin' Sound | 10th 3.67% | Eliminated (Week 1) | | | | | | | |
| Final showdown | Christian Link, Groovin Sound | Melanie Mackintosh, Ruben Thurnim | Hearts, Melanie Mackintosh | Anja Wessels, Hearts | Christian Link, Dorine Bijl | Christian Link, X6 | Anja Wessels, X6 | No judges' vote or final showdown: public votes alone decide who is eliminated and who ultimately wins | |
| Smits' vote to eliminate | Groovin' Sound | Melanie Mackintosh | Melanie Mackintosh | Hearts | Dorine Bijl | X6 | Anja Wessels | No judges' vote or final showdown: public votes alone decide who is eliminated and who ultimately wins | |
| Van Wijnkoop's vote to eliminate | Groovin' Sound | Ruben Thurnim | Melanie Mackintosh | Anja Wessels | Dorine Bijl | Christian Link | Anja Wessels | No judges' vote or final showdown: public votes alone decide who is eliminated and who ultimately wins | |
| Temming's vote to eliminate | Groovin' Sound | Ruben Thurnim | Hearts | Hearts | Christian Link | Christian Link | X6 | No judges' vote or final showdown: public votes alone decide who is eliminated and who ultimately wins | |
| Eliminated | Groovin' Sound; 3 of 3 votes Majority | Ruben Thurnim; 2 of 3 votes Majority | Melanie Mackintosh; 2 of 3 votes Majority | Hearts; 2 of 3 votes Majority | Dorine Bijl; 2 of 3 votes Majority | Christian Link; 2 of 3 votes Majority | Anja Wessels; 2 of 3 votes Majority | X6; 25.33% to win | Richy Brown; 25% to win |
| Eliminated | Groovin' Sound; 3 of 3 votes Majority | Ruben Thurnim; 2 of 3 votes Majority | Melanie Mackintosh; 2 of 3 votes Majority | Hearts; 2 of 3 votes Majority | Dorine Bijl; 2 of 3 votes Majority | Christian Link; 2 of 3 votes Majority | Anja Wessels; 2 of 3 votes Majority | X6; 25.33% to win | Sharon Kips; 75% to win |

=== X Factor 2 (2009) ===
Colour key:

| – | A finalist who was in the Bottom 2 and had to sing again in the sing-off |
| – | The finalist who received the fewest votes and therefore was eliminated immediately (no sing-off) |

| | Week 1 | Week 2 | Week 3 | Week 4 | Week 5 | Week 6 | Week 7 | Week 8 | |
| | Week 1 | Week 2 | Week 3 | Week 4 | Week 5 | Week 6 | Week 7 | Round 1 | Round 2 |
|---|---|---|---|---|---|---|---|---|---|
| Lisa Hordijk | Safe | Safe | Safe | Safe | Safe | Safe | Safe | Safe | Winner (Week 8) |
| Rachel Kramer | Safe | Safe | Safe | Safe | Safe | Bottom; Two | Safe | Safe | Runner-up (Week 8) |
| Jamal Bijnoe | Safe | Safe | Bottom; Two | Safe | Bottom; Two | Safe | Safe | 3rd | Eliminated (Week 8) |
| Roan Hamminga | Safe | Safe | Safe | Safe | Safe | Safe | 4th | Eliminated (Week 7) | |
| Whatever | Safe | Safe | Safe | Safe | Safe | Safe | 5th | Eliminated (Week 7) | |
| Hester Kootstra | 11th 3.25% | Safe | Safe | Safe | Safe | Safe | 6th | Eliminated (Week 7) | |
| Luigiano Paals | Safe | Bottom; Two | Safe | Bottom; Two | Safe | Bottom; Two | Eliminated (Week 6) | | |
| Rev 'n Ros | Safe | Safe | Safe | Safe | Bottom; Two | Eliminated (Week 5) | | | |
| Irma Derby | Safe | Safe | Safe | Bottom; Two | Eliminated (Week 4) | | | | |
| Laurens Wauters | Safe | Safe | Bottom; Two | Eliminated (Week 3) | | | | | |
| Jennifer Terwel | Safe | Bottom; Two | Eliminated (Week 2) | | | | | | |
| K.L.E.M. | 12th 2.9% | Eliminated (Week 1) | | | | | | | |
| Final showdown | Hester Kootstra, K.L.E.M. | Jennifer Terwel, Luigiano Paals | Jamal Bijnoe, Laurens Wauters | Irma Derby, Luigiano Paals | Jamal Bijnoe, Rev 'n Ros | Luigiano Paals, Rachel Kramer | No judges' vote or final showdown: public votes alone decide who is eliminated and who ultimately wins | | |
| Judges voted to | Eliminate | | | | | | No judges' vote or final showdown: public votes alone decide who is eliminated and who ultimately wins | | |
| Van Tijn's vote | Hester Kootstra | Jennifer Terwel | Jamal Bijnoe | Irma Derby | Jamal Bijnoe | Luigiano Paals | No judges' vote or final showdown: public votes alone decide who is eliminated and who ultimately wins | | |
| Rookhuizen's vote | Hester Kootstra | Jennifer Terwel | Laurens Wauters | Irma Derby | Rev 'n Ros | Rachel Kramer | No judges' vote or final showdown: public votes alone decide who is eliminated and who ultimately wins | | |
| Groothuizen's vote | K.L.E.M. | Jennifer Terwel | Laurens Wauters | Luigiano Paals | Rev 'n Ros | Luigiano Paals | No judges' vote or final showdown: public votes alone decide who is eliminated and who ultimately wins | | |
| Heuckenroth's vote | K.L.E.M. | Luigiano Paals | Laurens Wauters | Irma Derby | Rev 'n Ros | Luigiano Paals | No judges' vote or final showdown: public votes alone decide who is eliminated and who ultimately wins | | |
| Eliminated | K.L.E.M. 2 of 4 votes Deadlock | Jennifer Terwel; 3 of 4 votes Majority | Laurens Wauters; 3 of 4 votes Majority | Irma Derby; 3 of 4 votes Majority | Rev 'n Ros; 3 of 4 votes Majority | Luigiano Paals; 3 of 4 votes Majority | Hester Kootstra; Bottom | Jamal Bijnoe; Bottom | Rachel Kramer; 31% to win |
| Eliminated | K.L.E.M. 2 of 4 votes Deadlock | Jennifer Terwel; 3 of 4 votes Majority | Laurens Wauters; 3 of 4 votes Majority | Irma Derby; 3 of 4 votes Majority | Rev 'n Ros; 3 of 4 votes Majority | Luigiano Paals; 3 of 4 votes Majority | Whatever; Bottom | Jamal Bijnoe; Bottom | Lisa Hordijk; 69% to win |
| Eliminated | K.L.E.M. 2 of 4 votes Deadlock | Jennifer Terwel; 3 of 4 votes Majority | Laurens Wauters; 3 of 4 votes Majority | Irma Derby; 3 of 4 votes Majority | Rev 'n Ros; 3 of 4 votes Majority | Luigiano Paals; 3 of 4 votes Majority | Roan Hamminga; Bottom | Jamal Bijnoe; Bottom | Lisa Hordijk; 69% to win |

=== X Factor 3 (2010) ===
Colour key:

| – | A finalist who was in the Bottom 2 and had to sing again in the sing-off |
| – | The finalist who received the fewest votes and therefore was eliminated immediately (no sing-off) |

| | Week 1 | Week 2 | Week 3 | Week 4 | Week 5 | Week 6 | Week 7 | Week 8 | | |
| | Week 1 | Week 2 | Week 3 | Week 4 | Week 5 | Week 6 | Week 7 | Round 1 | Round 2 | Final |
|---|---|---|---|---|---|---|---|---|---|---|
| Jaap van Reesema | Safe | Safe | Safe | Safe | Safe | Safe | Safe | Safe | Safe | Winner (Week 8) |
| Maaike Vos | Safe | 9th 4.9% | Safe | Safe | Safe | Safe | Safe | Safe | Safe | Runner-up (Week 8) |
| Kelvin Muïs | Safe | Safe | Safe | Bottom; Two | Safe | 6th | Bottom; Two | Safe | 3rd | Eliminated (Week 8) |
| Dony Vernianto | Safe | Safe | Safe | Safe | Safe | Safe | Safe | 4th | Eliminated (Week 8) | |
| BadBoyz | Safe | Safe | Safe | Safe | Bottom; Two | Safe | Bottom; Two | Eliminated (Week 7) | | |
| Sumera Espinel | Safe | Safe | Safe | Safe | Safe | 5th | Eliminated (Week 6) | | | |
| Daniëlle Penning | Bottom; Three | Safe | Bottom; Two | Safe | Bottom; Two | Eliminated (Week 5) | | | | |
| Sarina Kuipers | Safe | Safe | Safe | Bottom; Two | Eliminated (Week 4) | | | | | |
| Mathijs Rumping | Safe | Safe | Bottom; Two | Eliminated (Week 3) | | | | | | |
| 4Granted | Safe | 10th 3.9% | Eliminated (Week 2) | | | | | | | |
| Fierce | Bottom; Three | Eliminated (Week 1) | | | | | | | | |
| Janna van den Broek | Bottom; Three | Eliminated (Week 1) | | | | | | | | |
| Final showdown | Daniëlle Penning, Fierce, Janna vd Broek | 4Granted, Maaike Vos | Daniëlle Penning, Mathijs Rumping | Kelvin Muïs, Sarina Kuipers | BadBoyz, Daniëlle Penning | Kelvin Muïs, Sumera Espinel | BadBoyz, Kelvin Muïs | No judges' vote or final showdown: public votes alone decide who is eliminated and who ultimately wins | | |
| Judges voted to | Send through | Eliminate | | | | | | No judges' vote or final showdown: public votes alone decide who is eliminated and who ultimately wins | | |
| Van Tijn's vote | Janna vd Broek | 4Granted | Mathijs Rumping | Kelvin Muïs | Daniëlle Penning | Sumera Espinel | BadBoyz | No judges' vote or final showdown: public votes alone decide who is eliminated and who ultimately wins | | |
| Rookhuizen's vote | Daniëlle Penning | 4Granted | Mathijs Rumping | Sarina Kuipers | BadBoyz | Kelvin Muïs | BadBoyz | No judges' vote or final showdown: public votes alone decide who is eliminated and who ultimately wins | | |
| Groothuizen's vote | Daniëlle Penning | Maaike Vos | Daniëlle Penning | Sarina Kuipers | Daniëlle Penning | Sumera Espinel | BadBoyz | No judges' vote or final showdown: public votes alone decide who is eliminated and who ultimately wins | | |
| Heuckenroth's vote | Fierce | Maaike Vos | Mathijs Rumping | Sarina Kuipers | Daniëlle Penning | Sumera Espinel | Kelvin Muïs^{1} | No judges' vote or final showdown: public votes alone decide who is eliminated and who ultimately wins | | |
| Eliminated | Fierce; 1 of 4 votes Minority | 4Granted; 2 of 4 votes Deadlock | Mathijs Rumping; 3 of 4 votes Majority | Sarina Kuipers; 3 of 4 votes Majority | Daniëlle Penning; 3 of 4 votes Majority | Sumera Espinel; 3 of 4 votes Majority | BadBoyz; 3 of 4 votes Majority | Dony Vernianto; Bottom | Kelvin Muïs; Bottom | Maaike Vos; 49% to win |
| Eliminated | Janna vd Broek; 1 of 4 votes Minority | 4Granted; 2 of 4 votes Deadlock | Mathijs Rumping; 3 of 4 votes Majority | Sarina Kuipers; 3 of 4 votes Majority | Daniëlle Penning; 3 of 4 votes Majority | Sumera Espinel; 3 of 4 votes Majority | BadBoyz; 3 of 4 votes Majority | Dony Vernianto; Bottom | Kelvin Muïs; Bottom | Jaap van Reesema; 51% to win |

Notes
*1 Gordon didn't attend the 7th live show so Edsillia Rombley replaced him. Therefore, Edsillia was the one who cast the vote for him.

=== X Factor 4 (2011) ===
Colour key:

| – | Act received the most public votes |
| – | A finalist who was in the Bottom 2 and had to sing again in the sing-off |
| – | The finalist who received the fewest votes and therefore was eliminated immediately (no sing-off) |

| | Week 1 | Week 2 | Week 3 | Week 4 | Week 5 | Week 6 | Week 7 | Week 8 | Week 9 | | Week 10 |
| | Week 1 | Week 2 | Week 3 | Week 4 | Week 5 | Week 6 | Week 7 | Week 8 | Round 1 | Round 2 | Week 10 |
|---|---|---|---|---|---|---|---|---|---|---|---|
| Rochelle Perts | 4th | 4th | 4th | 5th | 1st | 3rd | 1st | 1st | 1st | 1st | Winner (week 10) |
| Adlicious | 2nd | 3rd | 3rd | 1st | 3rd | 2nd | 3rd | 3rd | 3rd | 2nd | Runner-Up (week 10) |
| Rolf Wienk | 7th | 5th | 2nd | 2nd | 2nd | 1st | 2nd | 2nd | 2nd | 3rd | Eliminated (week 9) |
| Sim'Ran | 9th | 10th | 8th | 7th | 4th | 6th 24.6% | 5th | 5th | 4th | Eliminated (week 9) | |
| Pyke Pos | 6th | 1st | 1st | 3rd | 7th | 5th | 4th | 4th | Eliminated (week 8) | | |
| Ed Ruyer | 5th | 2nd | 6th | 4th | 6th | 4th | 6th | Eliminated (week 7) | | | |
| Sway | 11th 11.3% | 7th | 5th | 8th | 5th | 7th 19.2% | Eliminated (week 6) | | | | |
| Tim Suyderhoud | 3rd | 8th | 7th | 6th | 8th | Eliminated (week 5) | | | | | |
| Jessica Mougin | 1st | 6th | 9th | 9th | Eliminated (week 4) | | | | | | |
| Tania Christopher | 10th | 9th | 10th | Eliminated (week 3) | | | | | | | |
| Jantine Mak | 8th | 11th | Eliminated (week 2) | | | | | | | | |
| Jesse Zwaan | 12th 7.2% | Eliminated (week 1) | | | | | | | | | |
| Final showdown | Jesse Zwaan, Sway | Jantine Mak, Sim'Ran | Jessica Mougin, Tania Christopher | Jessica Mougin, Sway | Pyke Pos, Tim Suyderhoud | Sím'Ran, Sway | Ed Ruyer, Sim'Ran | Pyke Pos, Sim'Ran | No final showdown or judges' vote: results are based on public votes alone | | |
| Van Tijn's vote to eliminate | Sway | Jantine Mak | None (Refused) | Sway | Tim Suyderhoud | Sim'Ran | Ed Ruyer | Pyke Pos | No final showdown or judges' vote: results are based on public votes alone | | |
| Rookhuizen's vote to eliminate | Jesse Zwaan | Sim'Ran | N/A ^{1} | Jessica Mougin | Tim Suyderhoud | Sim'Ran | Sim'Ran | Sim'Ran | No final showdown or judges' vote: results are based on public votes alone | | |
| Groothuizen's vote to eliminate | Jesse Zwaan | Jantine Mak | Tania Christopher | Jessica Mougin | Tim Suyderhoud | Sway | Ed Ruyer | Pyke Pos | No final showdown or judges' vote: results are based on public votes alone | | |
| Heuckenroth's vote to eliminate | Sway | Jantine Mak | Tania Christopher | Jessica Mougin | Pyke Pos | Sway | Ed Ruyer | Pyke Pos ^2 | No final showdown or judges' vote: results are based on public votes alone | | |
| Eliminated | Jesse Zwaan; 2 of 4 votes Deadlock | Jantine Mak; 3 of 4 votes Majority | Tania Christopher; 2 of 2 votes Majority | Jessica Mougin; 3 of 4 votes Majority | Tim Suyderhoud; 3 of 4 votes Majority | Sway; 2 of 4 votes Deadlock | Ed Ruyer; 3 of 4 votes Majority | Pyke Pos; 3 of 4 votes Majority | Sim'Ran; Bottom | Rolf Wienk; Bottom | Adlicious; 27% to win |
| Eliminated | Jesse Zwaan; 2 of 4 votes Deadlock | Jantine Mak; 3 of 4 votes Majority | Tania Christopher; 2 of 2 votes Majority | Jessica Mougin; 3 of 4 votes Majority | Tim Suyderhoud; 3 of 4 votes Majority | Sway; 2 of 4 votes Deadlock | Ed Ruyer; 3 of 4 votes Majority | Pyke Pos; 3 of 4 votes Majority | Sim'Ran; Bottom | Rolf Wienk; Bottom | Rochelle Perts; 73% to win |

- ^1 Rookhuizen was not required to vote because Heuckenroth and Groothuizen had already voted to eliminate Tania Christopher.
- ^2 Heuckenroth was not present at this show because of De Toppers In Concert, in this show Heuckenroth was replaced by Ruud de Wild. De Wild voted to eliminate Pyke Pos.

=== X Factor 5 (2013) ===
Colour key:

| – | Act received the most public votes |
| – | A finalist who was in the Bottom 2 and had to sing again in the sing-off |
| – | The finalist who received the fewest votes and therefore was eliminated immediately (no sing-off) |

| | Week 1 | Week 2 | Week 3 | Week 4 | Week 5 | Week 6 | |
| | Week 1 | Week 2 | Week 3 | Week 4 | Week 5 | Round 1 | Round 2 |
|---|---|---|---|---|---|---|---|
| Haris Alagic | 1st | 3rd | 2nd | 1st | 2nd | 2nd 31.4% | Winner (week 6) |
| Adriaan Persons | 4th | 5th | 1st | 3rd | 3rd 24.3% | 1st 37.4% | Runner-Up (week 6) |
| B-Brave | 2nd | 4th | 3rd | 2nd | 1st | 3rd 31.2% | Eliminated (week 6) |
| Orpheus | 6th | 1st | 4th | 4th | 4th 21.9% | Eliminated (week 5) | |
| Astrid Tan | 7th | 2nd | 5th 16.4% | 5th | Eliminated (week 4) | | |
| Brown Hill | 5th | 6th 9.6% | 6th 10.6% | Eliminated (week 3) | | | |
| Milou van Egmond | 3rd | 7th 9.2% | Eliminated (week 2) | | | | |
| Clarissa Alberg | 8th | Eliminated (week 1) | | | | | |
| Final showdown | Astrid Tan, Clarissa Alberg | Brown Hill, Milou van Egmond | Astrid Tan, Brown Hill | Astrid Tan, Orpheus | Adriaan Persons, Orpheus | No final showdown or judges' vote: results are based on public votes alone | |
| Bouali's vote to eliminate | Astrid Tan | Brown Hill | Brown Hill | Astrid Tan | Orpheus | No final showdown or judges' vote: results are based on public votes alone | |
| Dulfer's vote to eliminate | Clarissa Alberg | Milou van Egmond | Astrid Tan | Orpheus | Adriaan Persons | No final showdown or judges' vote: results are based on public votes alone | |
| Groothuizen's vote to eliminate | Clarissa Alberg | Brown Hill | Brown Hill | Astrid Tan | Orpheus | No final showdown or judges' vote: results are based on public votes alone | |
| Heuckenroth's vote to eliminate | Clarissa Alberg | Milou van Egmond | Astrid Tan | Astrid Tan | Adriaan Persons | No final showdown or judges' vote: results are based on public votes alone | |
| Eliminated | Clarissa Alberg; 3 of 4 votes Majority | Milou van Egmond; 2 of 4 votes Deadlock | Brown Hill; 2 of 4 votes Deadlock | Astrid Tan; 3 of 4 votes Majority | Orpheus; 2 of 4 votes Deadlock | B-Brave; Bottom | Adriaan Persons; 36% to win |
| Eliminated | Clarissa Alberg; 3 of 4 votes Majority | Milou van Egmond; 2 of 4 votes Deadlock | Brown Hill; 2 of 4 votes Deadlock | Astrid Tan; 3 of 4 votes Majority | Orpheus; 2 of 4 votes Deadlock | B-Brave; Bottom | Haris Alagic; 64% to win |

=== Dutch X Factor Trivia, disputes and controversies ===
In May 2010, X Factor judge, and popular Dutch singer Gordon decided to vote off popular candidate Sumera Espinel Martinez when she landed in the Bottom Two, explaining that he did not like her facial expressions. She was a Dutch audience favourite. In the official X Factor rules, the role of the jury is to ensure that any exceptional singing talents make it through, judging solely on the voice quality of the contestants. Gordon had voted off Sumera Espinel Martinez because he felt her facial expressions (he perceived them as being too arrogant) were not fitting for a potential winner, as his own personal judgment. This was in contradiction to the X Factor rules, because the jury may not vote anyone off because of their appearance.

Sumera countered Gordon's criticism, by explaining that she had been criticized for being too humble and a bit insecure, and so, that "[she had been asked] to be secure and confident, which is what [she] did."

Sumera Espinel Martinez had received a great majority of the votes, in comparison to her fellow Bottom Two contestant Kelvin. Gordon's voting off of Sumera heaved great controversy among viewers; various petitions were created boycotting the show, and criticizing its format. In an interview with Dutch newspaper De Telegraaf, Gordon was quoted as saying she was too Nederland 3 (meaning that she was too arrogant). An initial article about the controversy was published on the Dutch MSN, at first in a fairly neutral light, but later edited in Gordon's favor.

In the following episode, Gordon could not participate for one show because he was giving a concert with his group, De Toppers in the Amsterdam Arena. Edsilia Rombley was asked as guest judge/coach for him, in this episode. His last remaining act, BadBoyz was voted off on this episode. As a consequence, Gordon threatened to leave X Factor. He later explained however, that, "it was not the elimination of BadBoyz, but the jury's criticisms that caused me to reconsider my job. I will attend the show on Friday unless something else comes up."

According to De Telegraaf, Gordon has sent his driver to the X Factor studio, to withdraw his colleagues' invitations for De Toppers in Concert. "They are not welcome at my De Toppers concert at the Arena. I haven't licked my wounds yet, and they've simply taken revenge on my BadBoyz act. I find it shameful!" He was particularly angered at the remarks of Stacey Rookhuizen. "It does not make any sense to me, that Boy and J-Me [the two members of the BadBoyz] looked homosexual; this has nothing to do with their ability as artists. They were merely mocking my sexual orientation!"

At the start of the show following the controversy, hosts Wendy and Martijn clearly remarked that Gordon's absence had nothing to do with Sumera's elimination. Following the BadBoyz' elimination, Wendy van Dijk further remarked that "the boys were better off getting a hug from [guest judge/coach] Edsilia Rombley, than from Gordon."

Gordon reportedly sent an email to the administration of RTL, with his criticisms of the way the BadBoyz' elimination was handled. The email supposedly included criticisms of all jury members, as well as hosts Wendy van Dijk and Martijn Krabbé. The exact content of the email was not released to the public.

Henkjan Smits, famous for himself being a previous X-Factor and Idols judge, remarked that he found this year's candidates "below average." He was concerned that all those with potential had been sent home by the jury prematurely, due to the coach/judging system. Smits had always been critical of the X-Factor "formula."

Henkjan Smits: "The Jury is insulted if I say that this year's talent isn't that great, but I'm simply a viewer now. The start of this season was so promising, but it ended very disappointing," he was quoted as saying to Veronica Magazine."
