= Joep Beving =

Dutch composer and pianist

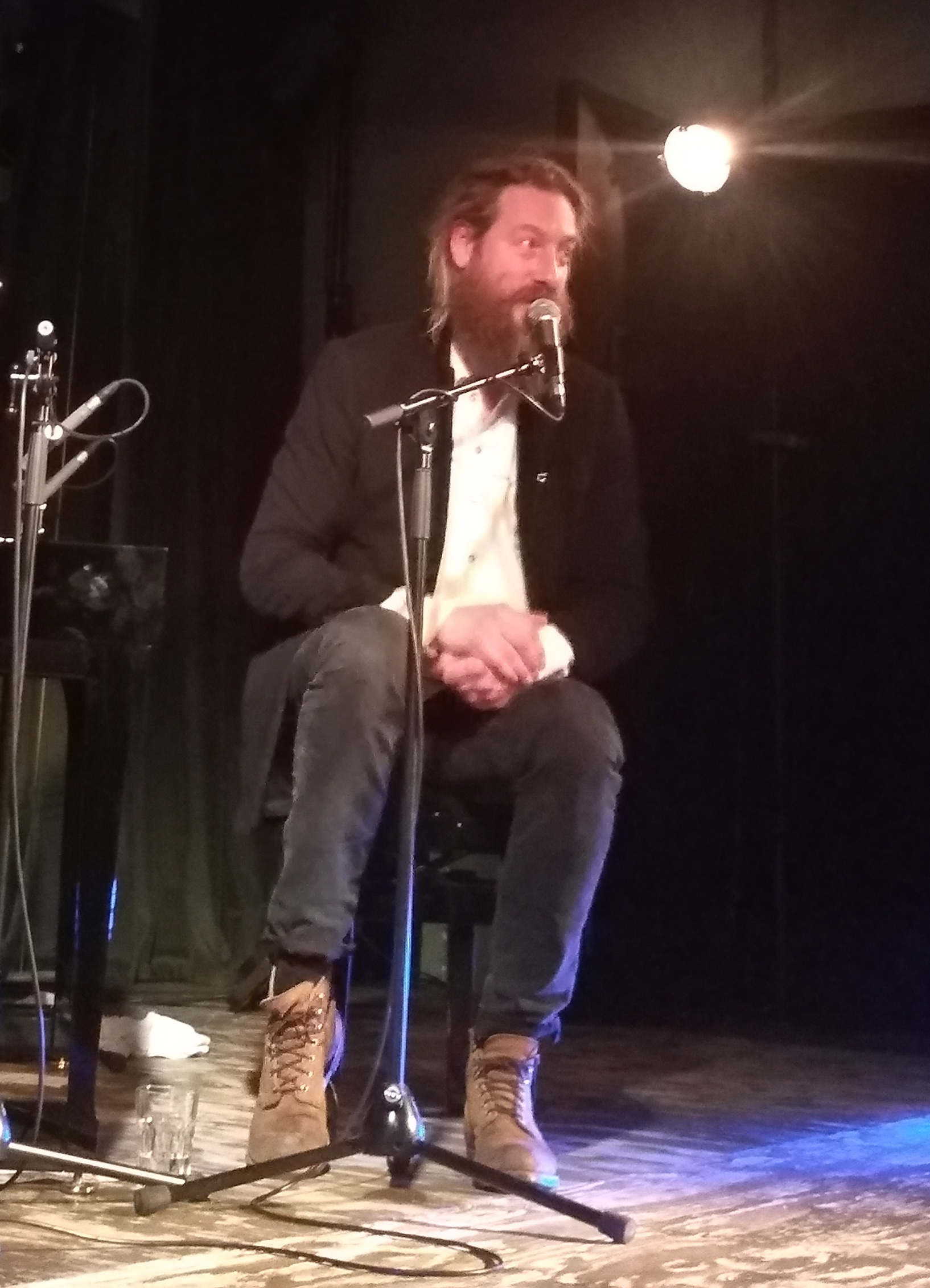
- Beving in 2017

Background information
- Born: 9 January 1976 (age 50); Doetinchem, the Netherlands
- Genres: Modern classical
- Instrument: Piano
- Years active: 2015–present
- Labels: Deutsche Grammophon; Universal Classics

Joep Beving (born 9 January 1976 in Doetinchem) is a Dutch composer and pianist.

== Life and work ==
Music has been a passion of Beving’s since childhood. The son of a schoolteacher, he formed his first band at the age of 14. He later won a place at a conservatoire, but repetitive strain injury to his wrist forced him to abandon his piano studies after a year. Instead, he studied public policy and administration.

He then went to work in the advertising business, where he was mainly responsible for the music of numerous commercials. He also composed soundtracks for the short films Hortum (2010) and Het cadeau (2015).

In 2015 Beving released his first album - Solipsism, with modern classical atmospheric piano pieces. He himself describes his compositions as "accessible music for complex emotions". In 2017 his second album, Prehension, appeared in a similar style to his debut album. In 2018 he made Conatus. He wrote several excerpts in Oxford.

== Discography ==
All of his recordings have been released by Deutsche Grammophon/Universal Classics:

- Solipsism (2015)
- Prehension (2017)
- Conatus (2018)
- Henosis (2019)
- Trilogy (2021)
- Hermetism (2022)
- vision of contentment (2024)
- Liminal (2026)

List of released singles:

- For Mark (2022)
- Nocturnal (2022)
- Sinfonia (After Bach, BVW 248) (2021)
- Antoinette (From "Mijn vader is een vliegtuig") (2021)
- Sinfonia (2021)
- Ala (2019)
- Venus (2019)
- Unus Mundus (2019)
- Into the dark blue (2019)
- Prelude(2018)
- Hanging D (2018)
- Sonderling (2017)
- Ab Ovo (2017)

== Musical style and influences ==
Beving cites his musical influences as Bill Evans, Keith Jarrett, Philip Glass, Arvo Pärt, Chopin, Satie, Radiohead and Mahler. His favourite classical composers are Scriabin, Prokofiev (especially his 3rd Piano Concerto), Mahler, Brahms, Arvo Pärt, Peteris Vasks and Tigran Hamasyan.

Beving says his writing is free of rules. His music often follows a pop structure (AABA) but also takes inspiration from ambient, electronic and minimal classical music.
