= Greetings & Salutations (Intergalactic Lovers album) =

Studio album by Intergalactic Lovers
- Released: 2011
- Genre: Indie rock, alternative rock
- Length: 45:38
- Producer: Thomas Hahn

Intergalactic Lovers chronology
Greetings & Salutations (2011)	Little Heavy Burdens (2014)

Singles from Greetings & Salutations
- 1. "Delay" Released: February 07, 2011; 2. "Shewolf" Released: May 09, 2011; 3. "Howl" Released: September 19, 2011

Greetings & Salutations is the first studio album by Belgian indie rock band Intergalactic Lovers.

== Track listing ==
All songs by Intergalactic Lovers and Thomas Hahn except tracks 3, 6, 10 by Intergalactic Lovers. Additional vocal on 6 by Ian Clement.

No.	Title	Length
1.	"Shewolf"	4:13
2.	"Look at Those Boys"	3:46
3.	"Delay"	3:49
4.	"Bruises"	5:21
5.	"Soul for Hire"	3:25
6.	"Pretty Baby"	3:23
7.	"Howl"	4:12
8.	"Fade Away"	3:05
9.	"Queen of the Sighs"	3:31
10.	"Drive"	5:27
11.	"Like a Fool"	5:24

== Charts ==
Chart (2011)	Peak position
Belgian Albums (Ultratop Flanders)	3
