= Little Heavy Burdens =

Studio album by Intergalactic Lovers
- Released: 2014
- Genre: Indie rock, alternative rock
- Length: 47:01

Intergalactic Lovers chronology
| Greetings & Salutations (2011) | Little Heavy Burdens (2014) | Exhale (2017) |

Singles from Little Heavy Burdens
- 1. "Islands" Released: January 06, 2014

Little Heavy Burdens is the second studio album by Belgian indie rock band Intergalactic Lovers.

== Track listing ==
| No. | Title | Length |
|---|---|---|
| 1. | "Northern Rd." | 4:25 |
| 2. | "Distance" | 3:38 |
| 3. | "Obstinate Heart" | 4:44 |
| 4. | "Islands" | 3:44 |
| 5. | "Great Evader" | 4:27 |
| 6. | "The Fall Pt. I" | 1:11 |
| 7. | "The Fall Pt. II" | 4:52 |
| 8. | "War" | 3:30 |
| 9. | "Someday" | 3:20 |
| 10. | "No Regrets" | 3:46 |
| 11. | "Sleep" | 4:00 |
| 12. | "Lost Message" | 3:56 |
| 13. | "Obstinate Heart Reprise" | 1:36 |

== Charts ==
=== Weekly charts ===
| Chart (2014) | Peak position |
|---|---|
| Belgian Albums (Ultratop Flanders) | 2 |
| Belgian Albums (Ultratop Wallonia) | 76 |

=== Year-end charts ===
| Chart (2014) | Position |
|---|---|
| Belgian Albums (Ultratop Flanders) | 28 |
| Chart (2015) | Position |
| Belgian Albums (Ultratop Flanders) | 63 |
