= Freek Vonk =

Dutch biologist

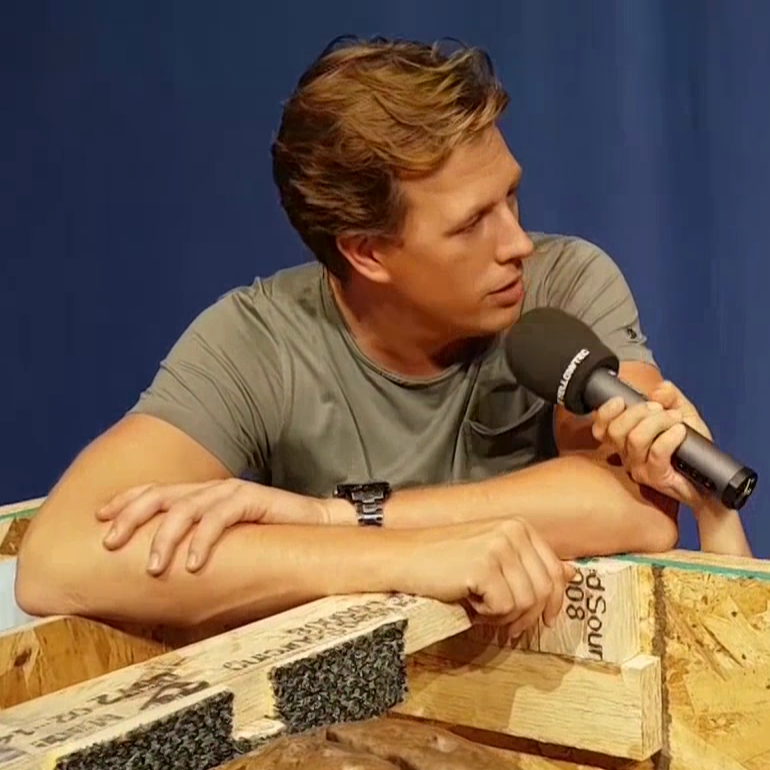
Freek Vonk (2016)

Freek Jacobus Vonk (born 24 February 1983) is a Dutch professor of biology who specializes in herpetology with a special interest in snake venom. He travels the world in search of the most spectacular and bizarre creatures. He has been bitten by a number of venomous snakes, almost lost his arm due to a Caribbean reef shark bite and has housed several parasites in his own body.

== Biography ==
=== Science ===
Vonk was born in Dordrecht, Netherlands. When he was a 22-year-old student, he was cited in an article of the Dutch television programme Noorderlicht. In 2006 he was a co-author of an article in Nature. He wrote his first own article in Litteratura Serpentium in 2007 and he was nominated for the Academische Jaarprijs (Academic Year Prize). In 2008, he was granted a scholarship for top talent of €180,000 by the Nederlandse Organisatie voor Wetenschappelijk Onderzoek (The Dutch Organisation of Science Investigation).

Vonk studied biology at Leiden University where he specialised in the evolutionary biology of reptiles, resulting in a PhD on Snake evolution and prospecting of snake venom. He was awarded the prestigious Eureka prize in science communication, for his contribution in increasing the knowledge and involvement of the general public in science. He advanced as a postdoctoral researcher at the Molecular Ecology and Evolution Group at Bangor University, sequencing and studying the genomes and transcriptomes of the king cobra. He continued this work at the Naturalis Biodiversity Center in Leiden, including the genomes of the Malayan pit viper. Over the years he has published articles in many scientific journals including Nature, Cell, and PNAS.

In 2020 he was appointed endowed professor of Evolutionary Biochemistry at the Amsterdam Institute of Molecular and Life Sciences (AIMMS), Department of Chemistry & Pharmaceutical Sciences, Vrije Universiteit Amsterdam. Freek is an internationally recognized expert in evolutionary molecular biology, particularly in the field of snake venom.

=== Media ===
In his early career, Vonk appeared in several television and radio programmes, including De Wereld Draait Door, GIEL and Vroege Vogels. He made television shows for National Geographic Channel and Discovery Channel. In August 2011, the Dutch television programme Uitgesproken broadcast an entire episode about Vonk and his pet rock monitor lizard Johan.

Vonk is now famous in the Netherlands for his television programs, in which he shares his love for wildlife with his viewers. For the past seven seasons, Freek has been the most popular tv host amongst children, because of his popular documentary series Freeks Wild World. Freeks Wild World is broadcast on the Dutch public channel NPO 3, the show reaches over a million viewers per episode. Among the most highly acclaimed TV projects were three episodes of ‘DWDD University’ in which Prof. Dr. Vonk gave an hour-long lecture about venom, the evolution of animals and super senses. The shows scored over one and a half million viewers during prime time, on the largest Dutch broadcasting network.

Furthermore Freek has his own children's magazine called “Wild van Freek” reaching tens of thousands of children every month. Freek also annually hosts a show in AFAS Live, called Freek Vonk Live, where thousands of families come and see Freek perform every year. Since 2014, Vonk has been the ambassador of Future For Nature Foundation, a foundation that supports young conservationists committed to protecting wild animals and plants. He also has his own foundation that campaigns against poaching, called No Wildlife Crime.

== Scouting ==
On 24 September 2021 Vonk was appointed Chief Scout of Scouting Nederland, or the main ambassador and face of the organisation. Vonk is the second Chief Scout of Scouting in the Netherlands, which was founded in 1911. From 1927 to 1937, naval officer and politician Jean Jacques Rambonnet fulfilled that role with the De Nederlandsche Padvinders (NPV, "The Dutch Pathfinders").

== Bibliography ==
- Freek Jacobus Vonk: Snake evolution and prospecting of snake venom. Leiden University, 2012. Online version
