= Rondé =

Dutch indie pop band

RONDÉ
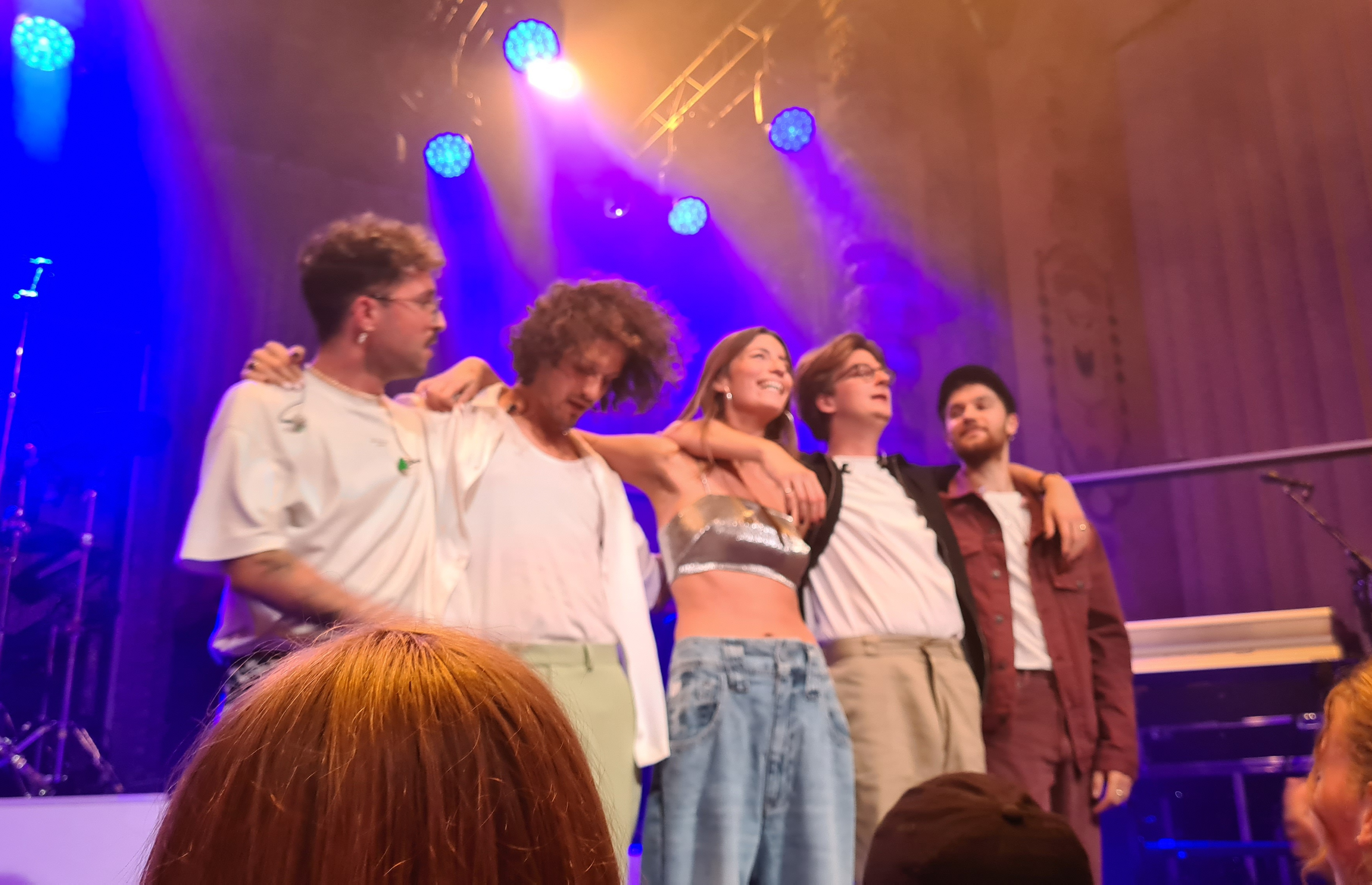
- Rondé in 2022

Background information
- Origin: Utrecht, Netherlands
- Genres: Indie pop; pop rock
- Years active: 2014–present
- Labels: Universal
- Members: Rikki Borgelt; Teun Dillisse; Cas Oomen; Armel Paap; Sharon Zarr
- Past members: Adriaan Persons; Isaï Reiziger
- Website: www.rondeofficial.com

Rondé is a Dutch indie pop band from Utrecht, formed in 2014. The group consists of singer Rikki Borgelt, keyboardist Teun Dillisse, bassist Cas Oomen, guitarist Armel Paap and drummer Sharon Zarr. Rondé won the 3FM Serious Talent Award from Dutch radio station NPO 3FM in 2015.

The band's third album Ten (2024) debuted at No. 5 on the Dutch Albums Chart and spawned five consecutive top-ten singles on the Dutch Top 40.

== History ==
A school assignment at the Herman Brood Academie led to the formation of Rondé in the spring of 2014. In April of that year the band took part in Herman Brood Academie on Tour, a short tour along various Dutch pop stages. As OOR Talent, the band participated in the Popronde in September 2014, which is a traveling music festival that visits numerous Dutch cities and towns each year.

In October 2014, their single "Run" were proclaimed 3FM Serious Talent and 3FM Megahit respectively. After their performance at Eurosonic Noorderslag in 2015, vocalist Rikki Borgelt had surgery on her vocal cords due to sustaining vocal cord nodules. In April 2015 the band won the 3FM Serious Talent Award, and a few days later their single "We Are One" became Rondé's second 3FM Megahit.

The band's first album, the eponymous Rondé, was released on 13 January 2017. Their second album Flourish was released on 8 March 2019, containing twelve songs including 3FM Megahit "Calling". Another 3FM Megahit by Rondé, "Get To You", was released in 2020. In 2020, keyboardist Adriaan Persons left the band to focus on his career as a songwriter and producer.

In August 2021, the band released "Hard to Say Goodbye", which was rewarded with the Harde Schijf and Favourite Track awards from Dutch station Radio 538 in August 2021. In 2023, Rondé played at Pinkpop Festival. The band's third album and first in five years, Ten came out in November 2024, their tenth year as a band. It entered at No. 5 on the Dutch Albums Chart. On 15 November 2024, they played their largest show yet at AFAS Live in Amsterdam.

== Members ==
- Rikki Borgelt – lead vocals (2014–present)
- Armel Paap – guitar (2014–present)
- Cas Oomen – bass (2014–present)
- Sharon Zarr – drums (2015–present)
- Teun Dillisse – keyboards (2020–present)

=== Former members ===
- Adriaan Persons – keyboards (2014–2020)
- Isaï Reiziger – drums (2014–2015)

== Discography ==
=== Albums ===
Title	Album details	Peak chart positions
Title	Album details	NLD
Rondé	Released: 13 January 2017; Label: Universal; Formats: CD, LP, digital download	18
Flourish	Released: 19 March 2019; Label: Universal; Formats: CD, LP, digital download	8
Ten	Released: 8 November 2024; Label: Universal; Formats: CD, LP, digital download	5

=== Singles ===
Single	Year	Peak		Certifications	Album
Single	Year	NL	NL Tip	Certifications	Album
"Run"	2014	—	2	NL: Gold	Non-album singles
"Run" (East & Young Remix)	2015	—	7		Non-album singles
"We Are One"	2015	—	11		Non-album singles
"Why Do You Care"	2016	—	1		Rondé
"Naturally"	2017	31			Rondé
"Headlights"	2017	—	11		Rondé
"City Lights"	2017	—	9		Rondé
"Calling"	2018	—	8		Flourish
"Be Mine"	2019	—	13		Flourish
"Anyone"	2019	—	—		Flourish
"Get to You"	2020	—	—		Non-album singles
"Real Feelings"	2020	—	—		Non-album singles
"Hard to Say Goodbye"	2021	5		NL: Platinum	Ten
"Love Myself"	2022	5		NL: Platinum	Ten
"Bright Eyes"	2022	9		NL: Gold	Ten
"Break My Heart"	2023	9			Ten
"Undecided"	2024	10			Ten
"Taking My Love Back"	2024	—	1		Ten
"Love of My Life"	2024	15			Ten
"I Believe in Love"	2024	—	—		Ten

== Awards ==
- 2015 - Winner 3FM Serious Talent Award
- 2018 - Winner Schaal van Rigter (with Naturally)
- Run: 3FM Megahit, two times Favoruudschijf
- We Are One: 3FM Megahit
- Why Do You Care: 3FM Megahit, Harde Schijf (Radio 538)
- Naturally: Topsong NPO Radio 2, Harde Schijf (Radio 538), Schaal van Rigter
- Headlights: Topsong NPO Radio 2
- Calling: Topsong NPO Radio 2, 3FM Megahit
- Get To You: 3FM Megahit
- Hard To Say Goodbye: Harde Schijf (Radio 538), Favourite Track (Radio 538), 3FM Megahit
