= Otherkin (band) =

Irish garage rock band

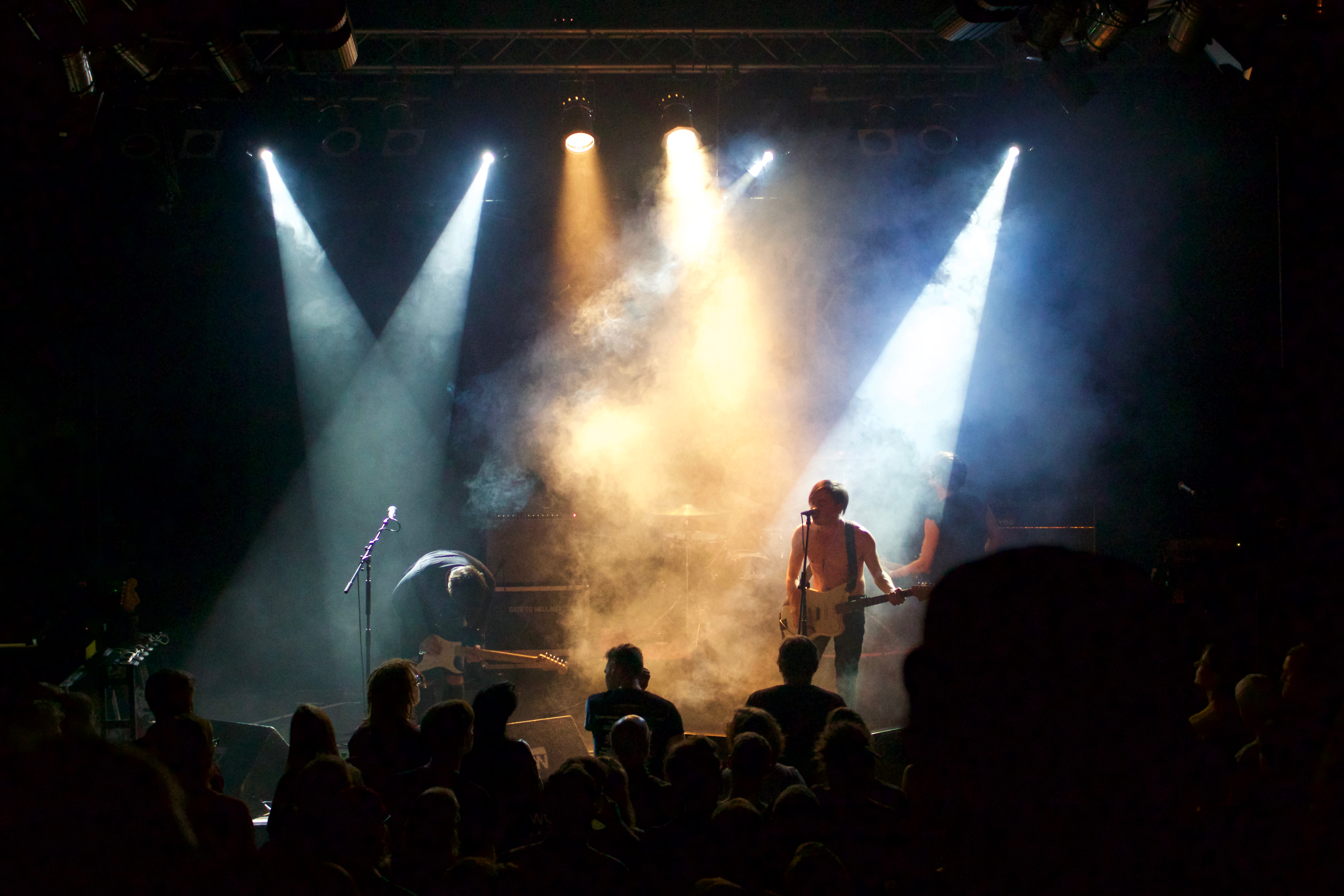
- Otherkin at the 2016 Way Back When festival

Background information
- Origin: Dublin, Ireland
- Genres: indie; indie rock; garage rock
- Years active: 2014–2019
- Labels: Rubyworks Records
- Past members: Luke Reilly; Conor Andrew Wynne; David Anthony; Rob Summons
- Website: otherkinok.com

Otherkin were an Irish garage rock band from Dublin active between 2014 and 2019. Noted for their "incendiary" live shows, they supported Guns N' Roses at Slane Castle in 2017.

== Career ==
Otherkin were founded in 2014; they cited The Clash, Queens of the Stone Age, The Ramones and Blur as influences. Their first album, OK, was released in 2017; it was nominated for the Choice Music Prize. They broke up in 2019.

== Personnel ==
- Luke Reilly (vocals, guitar)
- Conor Andrew Wynne (lead guitar)
- David Anthony (bass guitar)
- Rob Summons (drums)

== Discography ==
EPs

- The 201 (2015)
- The New Vice (2016)
- Electric Dream (2019)

Studio albums

- OK (2017)

Live albums

- Deutschland KO (2018)

== Gallery ==
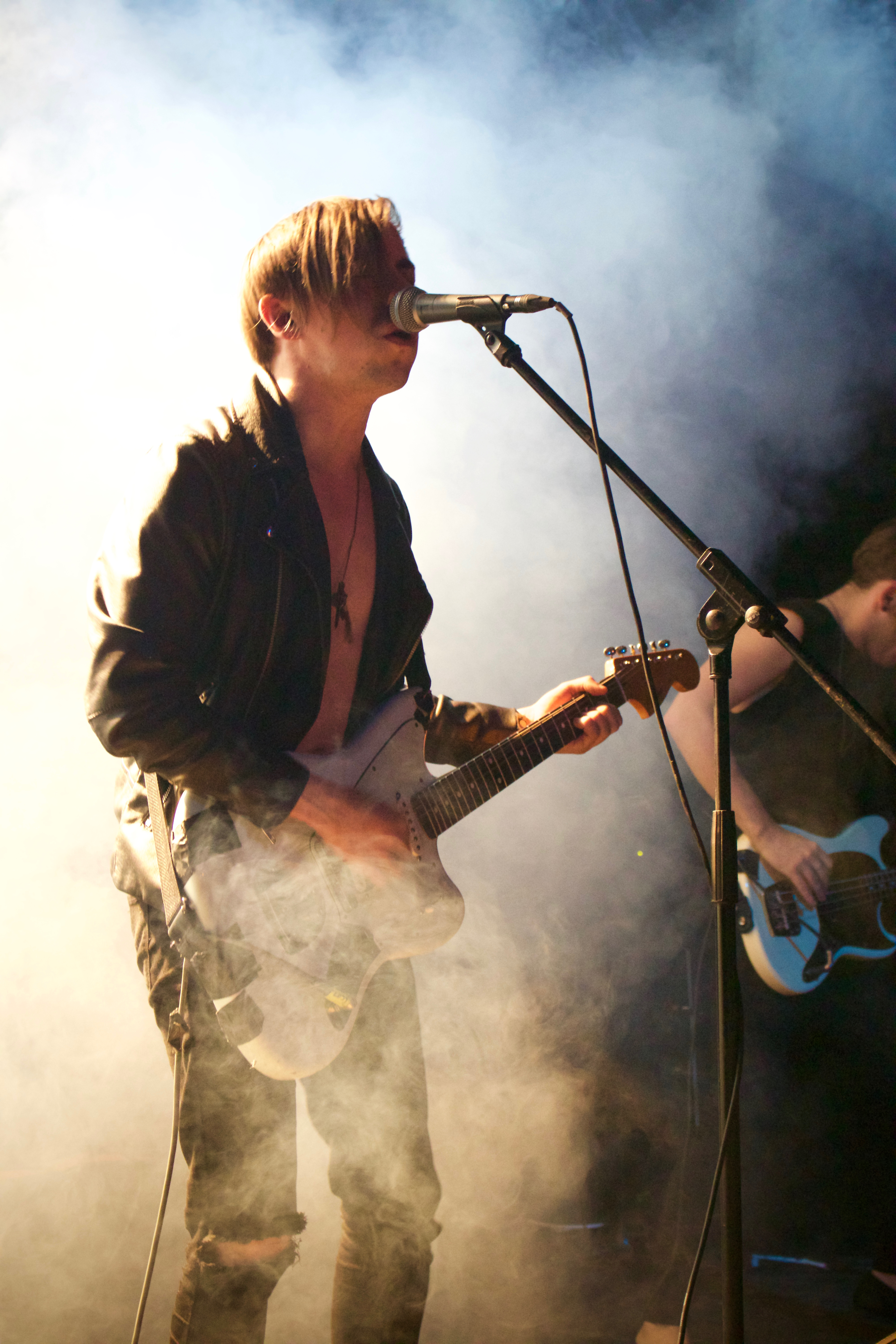
Luke Reilly

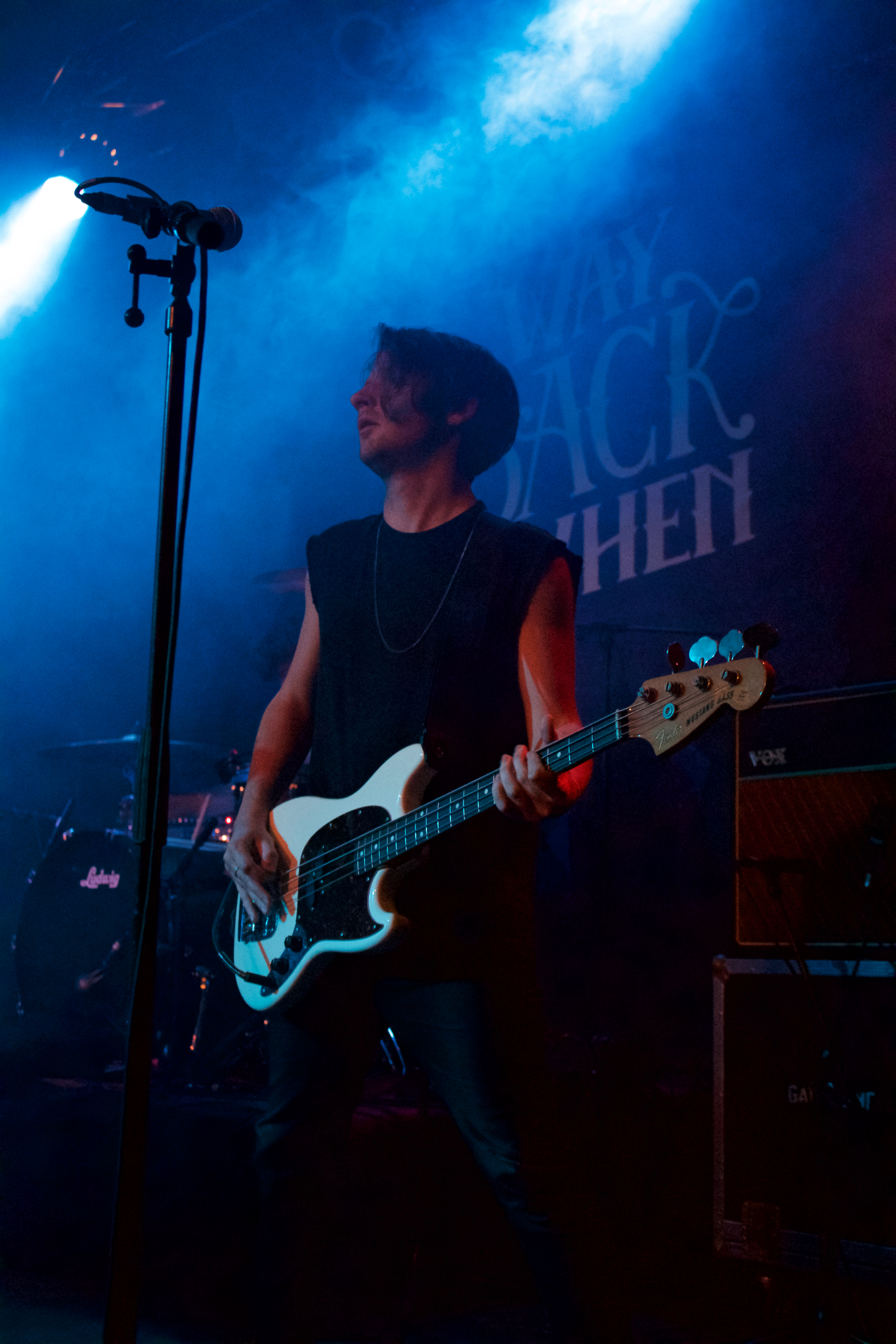
David Anthony

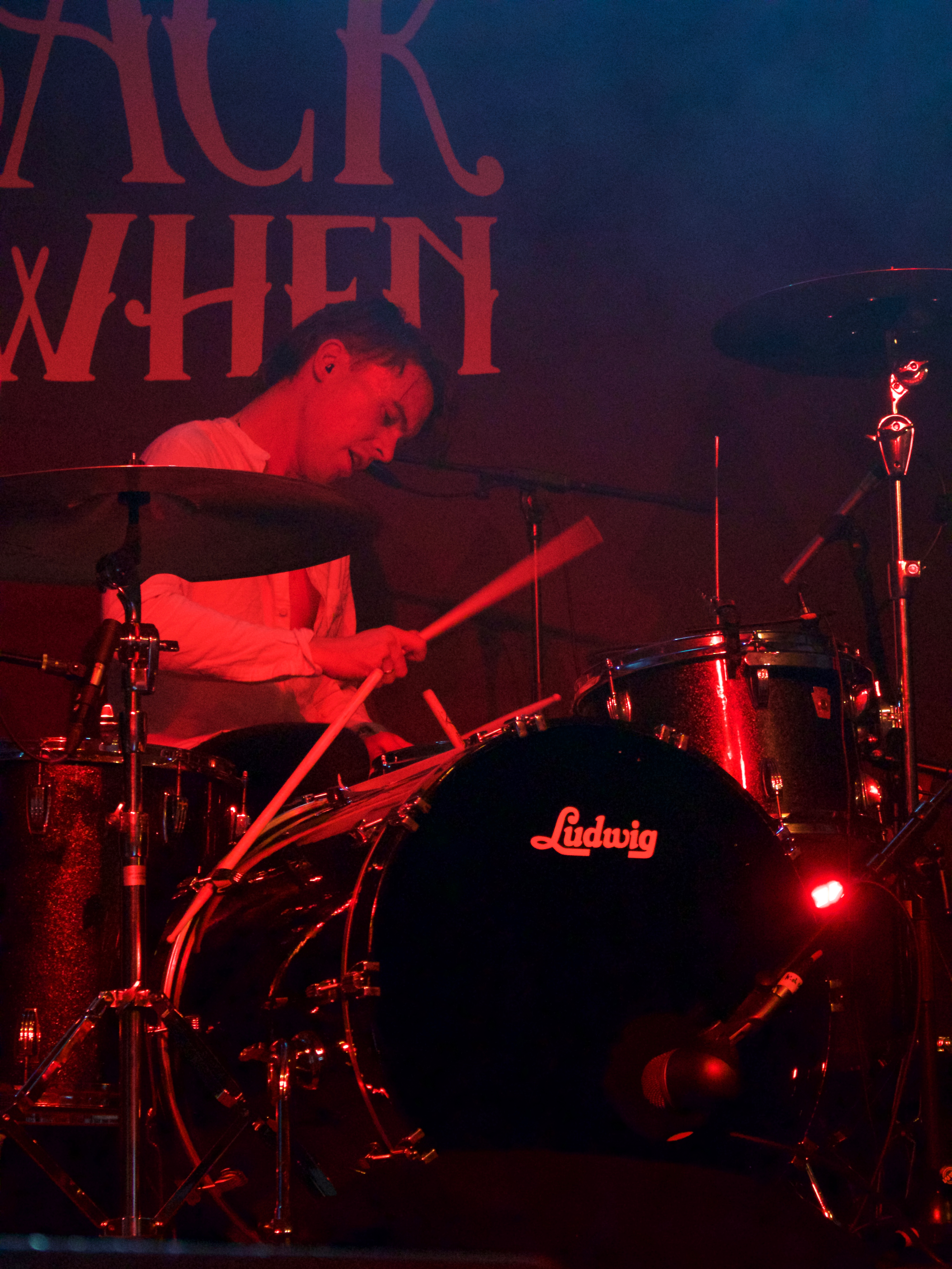
Rob Summons

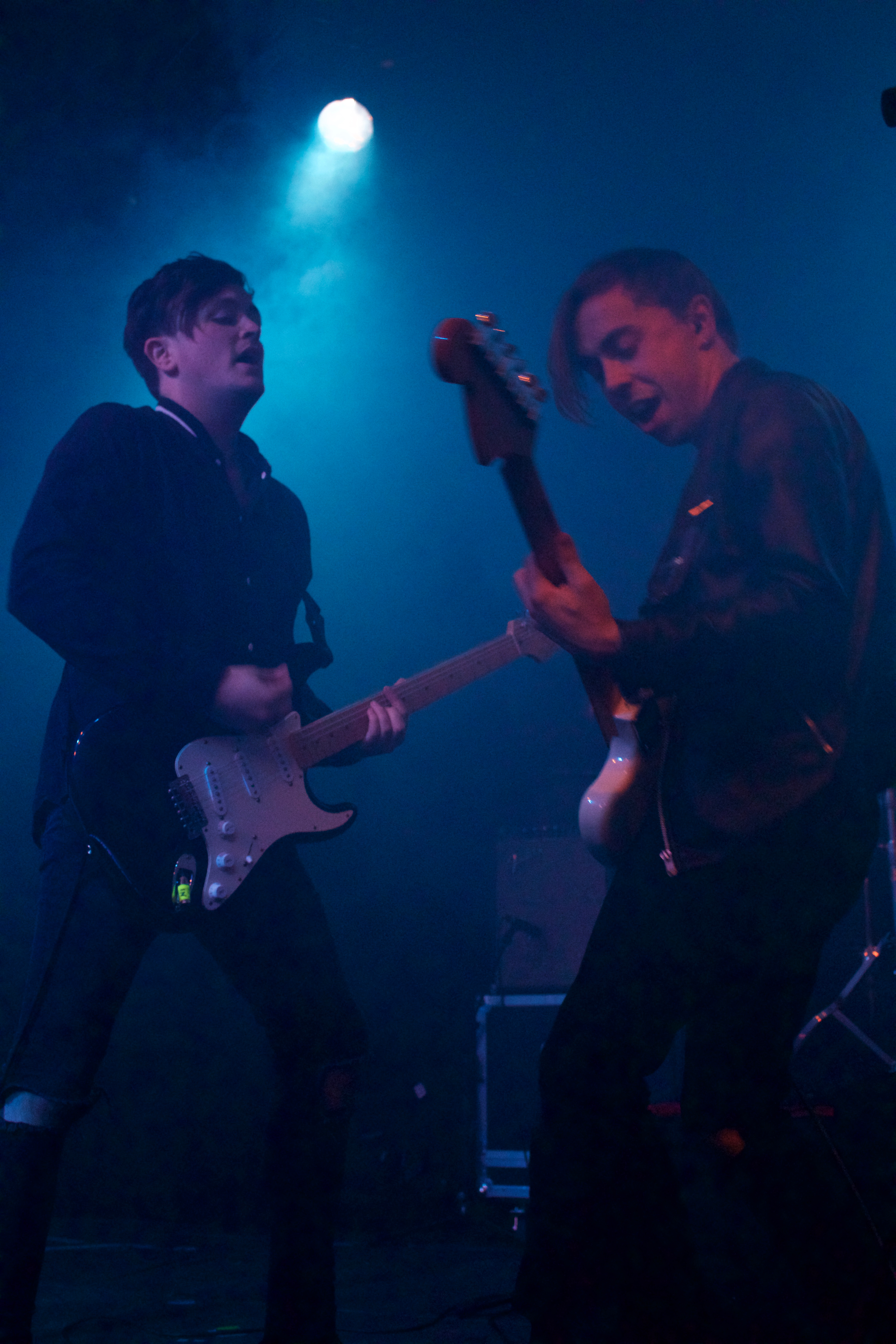
Conor Andrew Wynne and Luke Reilly
