= B-Brave =

Dutch boy band

- Origin: Netherlands
- Genres: Pop
- Years active: 2013–2017
- Labels: Sony Music
- Members: Dioni Gomez-Jurado; Samuel Leijten; Kaj van der Voort; Cassius Verbond; Jai Wowor
- Website: b-brave.nl

B-Brave were a boy band from the Netherlands founded in 2013. It consisted of Kaj van der Voort, Samuel Leijten, Cassius Verbond, Dioni Gomez-Jurado, and Jai Wowor. B-Brave placed third in the fifth series of the Dutch version of the X Factor.

== History ==
B-Brave signed to Sony Music on July 17, 2013. The band stated their intentions to create music in English, in order to appeal to a more international market. The group disbanded in 2017.

== Members ==
- Dioni Jurado-Gomez was born in Amsterdam, Netherlands on October 30, 1997 (age 28).
- Samuel Leijten was born in Badhoevedorp, Netherlands on February 17, 1996 (age 29).
- Cassius Verbond was born in Amsterdam, Netherlands on July 11, 1997 (age 28).
- Kaj van der Voort was born in Beverwijk, Netherlands on July 5, 1996 (age 29).
- Jai Wowor was born in Hardinxveld-Giessendam, Netherlands on November 16, 1997 (age 28).

== Discography ==
=== Albums ===
Title	Details	Peak chart positions
Title	Details	NED
De eerste date	Released: October 10, 2014	2
Los	Released: 2016	16

=== Singles ===
Title	Details	Peak chart positions
Title	Details	NED
Up	Released: July 6, 2013	45
Bij mij	Released: November 24, 2013	36
Als je van mij bent	Released: February 28, 2014	40
Vanavond is van jou	Released: June 22, 2014	27
Bad	Released: October 3, 2014	56
Ik laat je los	Released: December 5, 2014	93
Verleiden	Released: July 3, 2015	69
One Night Stand (featuring Sevn Alias)	Released: May 20, 2016	4
Onze jongens (Gooit het op me) (featuring Dio and Spanker)	Released: November 18, 2016	69
