= Intergalactic Lovers =

Belgian indie rock band

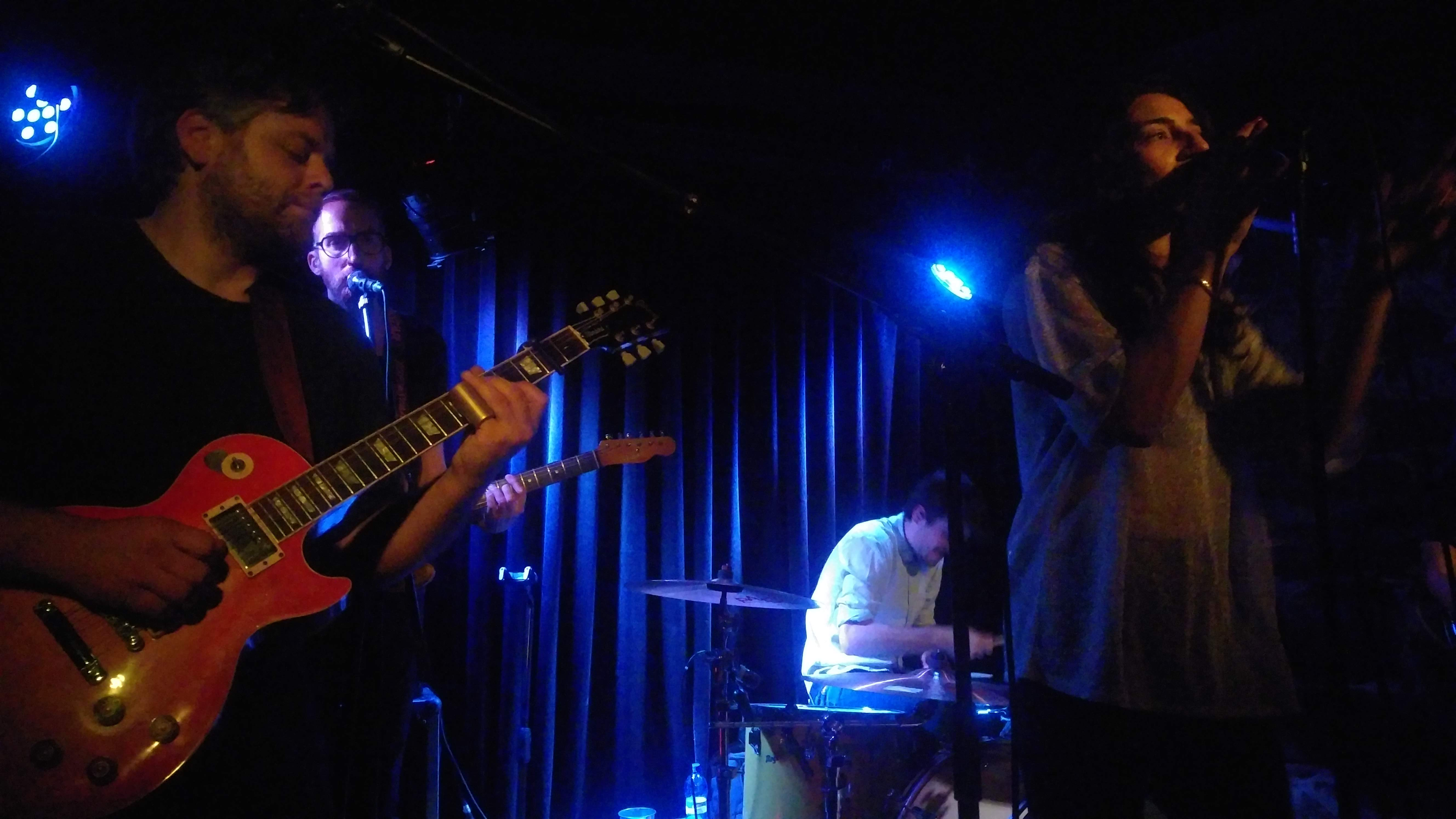
- Intergalactic Lovers performing in 2018

Background information
- Origin: Belgium
- Genres: Indie rock
- Years active: 2008–present
- Labels: Warner Music (Belgium, Netherlands, Luxembourg) / Grand Hotel van Cleef (Germany, Austria, Switzerland) / Independent (Rest of the World)
- Members: Lara Chedraoui; Brendan Corbey; Maarten Huygens; Raf De Mey
- Website: www.intergalacticlovers.com

Intergalactic Lovers is a Belgian indie rock band consisting of Lara Chedraoui, Brendan Corbey, Maarten Huygens and Raf De Mey.

== History ==
Intergalactic Lovers was founded in the summer of 2008. A couple of its members already participated in the Humos' Rock Rally 2008 under the name "Free Zamunda!" without success. Afterwards, the band was restructured and the current name adopted.

In 2009 Intergalactic Lovers won the Oost-Vlaams Rockconcours and Rock Rally De Beloften. Afterwards, their first successful single, "Fade Away", reached the playlists of radio channels Studio Brussel and Radio 1. Intergalactic Lovers then released "Delay", which was chosen as "Hotshot" by Studio Brussel. The song also made it to the number 1 spot in De Afrekening.

On 25 March 2011 they released their first album entitled "Greetings & Salutations", after releasing the title track of the album for download. The album was produced at the band's own expense and received a lot of positive coverage in HUMO and De Standaard.

On 10 December 2011 the band received a MIA (Music Industry Award) for 'Best Breakthrough Band'

Their second album "Little Heavy Burdens" was released on 14 February 2014 by Warner Music in Belgium, the Netherlands and Luxembourg and by German indie label Grand Hotel van Cleef in Germany, Austria and Switzerland. After the release of the album, the band started touring intensively, playing venues & music festivals in Belgium, the Netherlands, Germany, France, Austria, Switzerland, Denmark, Czech Republic, Japan and Russia.

Their musical style has been compared to Feist, PJ Harvey and Yeah Yeah Yeahs. In July 2013, it was announced that Intergalactic Lovers will provide the soundtrack for the film Code 37.

== Members ==
- Lara Chedraoui (vocals)
- Brendan Corbey (drums)
- Maarten Huygens (guitar)
- Raf De Mey (bass guitar)
- Philipp Weies (guitar)

== Discography ==
=== Albums ===
- Greetings & Salutations (2011)
- Little Heavy Burdens (2014)
- Exhale (2017)
- Liquid Love (2022)

=== Singles ===
Single(s) with hits in the Flemish Ultratop 50	Date of appearance	Date of entrance	Highest position	Number of weeks	Album
Delay	7 February 2011	19 March 2011	14	12	Greetings & Salutations
Shewolf	9 May 2011	18 June 2011	45	4	Greetings & Salutations
Howl	19 September 2011	22 October 2011	tip23	-	Greetings & Salutations
Feel for you	9 April 2012	21 April 2012	tip30	-	-
Islands	6 January 2014	11 January 2014	44	1	Little Heavy Burdens
Northern Rd.	-	10 May 2014	tip7	-	Little Heavy Burdens
No Regrets	-	18 October 2014	tip4	-	Little Heavy Burdens
