= Ufo361 discography =

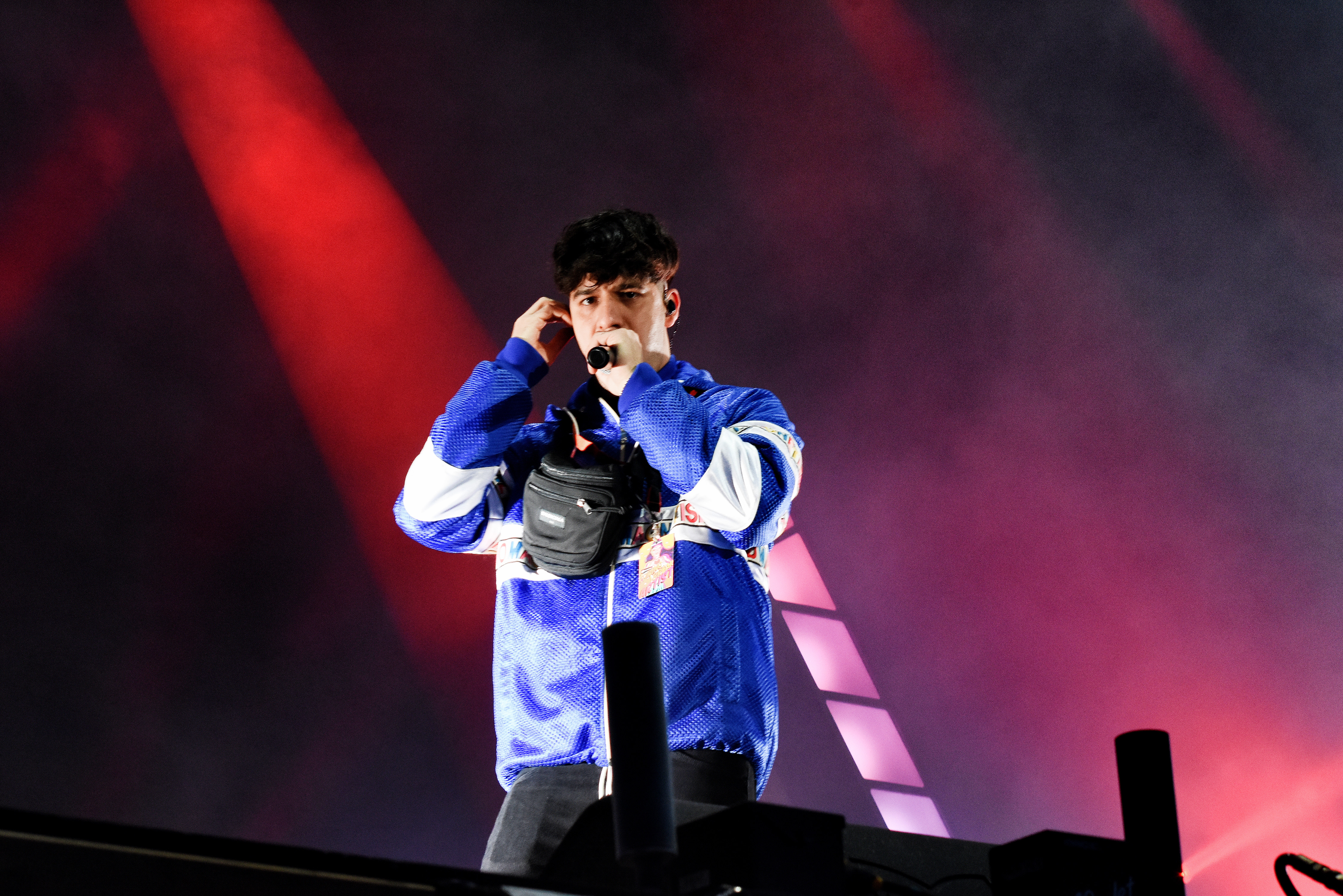
- Ufo361 at the Sputnik Spring Break in May 2018
- Studio albums: 11
- EPs: 4
- Mixtapes: 3

Turkish-German rapper Ufo361 has released eleven studio albums, three mixtapes and three extended plays.

== Albums ==
=== Studio albums ===
List of studio albums, with chart positions
Title	Details	Peak chart positions		
Title	Details	GER	AUT	SWI
Ihr seid nicht allein	Released: 15 August 2014; Label: Hoodrich; Formats: CD, digital download	—	—	—
808	Released: 13 April 2018; Label: Stay High, Groove Attack; Formats: CD, digital download	1	1	2
VVS	Released: 17 August 2018; Label: Stay High, Groove Attack; Formats: CD, digital download	2	1	2
Wave	Released: 9 August 2019; Label: Stay High, Groove Attack	1	2	3
Lights Out (with Ezhel)	Released: 15 November 2019; Label: Stay High	42	23	55
Rich Rich	Released: 24 April 2020; Label: Stay High	1	1	2
Nur für dich (with Sonus030)	Released: 2 October 2020; Label: Stay High	1	1	2
Stay High	Released: 30 April 2021; Label: Stay High	1	1	1
Destroy All Copies	Released: 3 September 2021; Label: Stay High	2	2	3
Love My Life	Released: 3 March 2023; Label: Stay High	2	1	3
Nur für dich 2	Released: 25 October 2024; Label: Stay High	3	4	4
Waldemar Hof	Released: 1 October 2026; Label: Stay High	6	3	4

=== Mixtapes ===
List of mixtapes, with chart positions
Title	Details	Peak chart positions		
Title	Details	GER	AUT	SWI
Ich bin ein Berliner	Released: 25 March 2016; Label: Ufo361; Formats: digital download	57	68	58
Ich bin 2 Berliner	Released: 30 September 2016; Label: Ufo361; Formats: digital download	13	24	20
Ich bin 3 Berliner	Released: 28 April 2017; Label: Stay High; Formats: CD, digital download	2	6	4

== Extended plays ==
List of extended plays
Title	Details
Bellini Boyz EP	Released: 18 June 2012; Label: Hoodrich; Format: Digital download
Bald ist dein Geld meins	Released: 14 June 2012; Label: Hoodrich; Format: Digital download
Tiffany	Released: 12 April 2018; Label: Stay High, Groove Attack; Formats: CD, digital download
VVS Bonus EP	Released: 17 August 2018; Label: Stay High, Groove Attack; Formats: CD, digital download

== Singles ==
=== As lead artist ===
List of singles as lead artist, with chart positions and certifications, showing year released and album name
Title	Year	Peak chart positions			Certifications	Album
Title	Year	GER	AUT	SWI	Certifications	Album
"Bang Bang"	2015	—	—	—		Ich bin ein Berliner
"Ich bin ein Berliner"	2015	—	—	—		Ich bin ein Berliner
"Allein"	2015	—	—	—		Ich bin ein Berliner
"Harman"	2015	—	—	—		Ich bin ein Berliner
"Scottie Pippen"	2016	—	—	—		Ich bin ein Berliner
"BLNFFM" (featuring Celo & Abdi)	2016	—	—	—		Ich bin ein Berliner
"Ich bin ein Berliner Remix" (featuring Sido, Bass Sultan Hengzt, BTNG & Crackaveli)	2016	—	—	—		Ich bin ein Berliner
"Bombay Gin" (featuring Yung Hurn)	2016	—	—	—		Ich bin 2 Berliner
"Ich hör nicht auf"	2016	—	—	—		Ich bin 2 Berliner
"Scheiß auf eure Party"	2016	—	—	—		Ich bin 2 Berliner
"Flieg"	2016	—	—	—		Ich bin 2 Berliner
"Mister T"	2017	—	—	—		Ich bin 3 Berliner
"James Dean"	2017	—	—	—		Ich bin 3 Berliner
"Für die Gang" (featuring Gzuz)	2017	30	—	78		Ich bin 3 Berliner
"Der Pate"	2017	38	—	—		Ich bin 3 Berliner
"Luzifer"	2017	—	—	—		non-album single
"Nice Girl 2.0"	2017	16	53	68	BVMI: Platinum; IFPI AUT: Gold	Tiffany
"Tiffany"	2017	15	36	73		Tiffany
"Stay High"	2017	—	—	—		non-album singles
"1 Schuss" (featuring Bonez MC)	2017	23	60	84		non-album singles
"Beverly Hills"	2018	4	16	26	BVMI: Gold	808
"Balenciaga"	2018	16	25	58		808
"Power" (featuring Capital Bra)	2018	7	21	54		808
"Ohne mich"	2018	21	30	76		808
"Acker jeden Tag"	2018	28	28	70		non-album singles
"Vorbeikommen"	2018	72	—	—		VVS
"Paradies" (featuring RAF Camora)	2018	16	12	31		VVS
"VVS" (featuring Quavo)	2018	16	14	25		VVS
"40k"	2018	13	19	37		VVS
"Pass auf wen du liebst"	2019	3	3	7	BVMI: Gold	Wave
"Next" (featuring RIN)	2019	3	2	10		Wave
"Gib Gas" (featuring Luciano)	2019	7	8	18		Wave
"Irina Shayk"	2019	6	6	13		Wave
"Shot" (featuring Data Luv)	2019	4	7	15	BVMI: Gold; IFPI AUT: Gold	Wave
"On Time"	2019	10	12	22		Wave
"Nummer"	2019	2	2	10		Wave
"Wir sind Kral" (with Ezhel)	2019	29	24	78		Lights Out
"YKKE" (with Ezhel)	2019	31	30	64		Lights Out
"Nur zur Info"	2019	20	55	34		Rich Rich
"Big Drip" (featuring Future)	2020	2	2	5		Rich Rich
"Rich Rich"	2020	2	2	8		Rich Rich
"Schlafen" (with Bausa and The Cratez)	2020	19	27	83		Nonstop
"Bad Girls, Good Vibes"	2020	4	3	11		Rich Rich
"Allein sein"	2020	3	3	12		Rich Rich
"Kaçamak" (with Reynmen)	2020	66	71	—		non-album single
"Final Fantasy"	2020	7	10	24		Rich Rich
"Fokus auf die Zukunft"	2020	26	16	49		Rich Rich
"Emotions"	2020	1	1	3	BVMI: Gold	Rich Rich
"Skrr" (with Kalim)	2020	8	8	15		Non album single
"Shit Changed" (with Sonus030)	2020	3	4	11		Nur für dich
"Playlist" (with Sonus030)	2020	3	3	14		Nur für dich
"Games" (with Sonus030)	2020	4	6	15		Nur für dich
"Kein Hunger" (with Loredana)	2020	9	17	17		Medusa
"7" (with Bonez MC)	2021	2	1	7		non-album singles
"No Hugs"	2021	4	4	10		non-album singles
"Wings"	2021	7	14	24		non-album singles
"Low Life" (featuring RIN)	2021	3	4	14		non-album singles
"Angekommen" (featuring Data Luv)	2021	16	21	40		non-album singles

=== As featured artist ===
List of singles as featured artist, with chart positions and certifications, showing year released and album name
Title	Year	Peak chart positions			Certifications	Album
Title	Year	GER	AUT	SWI	Certifications	Album
"Skyline (Remix)" (Trettmann featuring Ufo361, Samy Deluxe & DJ Stylewarz)	2016	—	—	—		non-album single
"Ala Ba Ba" (Capital Bra featuring Ufo361)	2016	—	—	—		Kuku Bra
"Wie Falco" (Nimo featuring Ufo361 and Yung Hurn)	2017	64	—	—	BVMI: Gold	K¡K¡
"Waffen" (RAF Camora featuring Bonez MC and Gzuz)	2017	21	45	47		Anthrazit RR
"Neymar" (Capital Bra featuring Ufo361)	2018	1	1	2	BVMI: Platinum	Berlin lebt
"Über Nacht" (Gzuz featuring Bonez MC, Maxwell & Ufo361)	2018	6	6	22		Wolke 7
"Plug Walk (Remix)" (Rich the Kid featuring Ufo361)	2018	—	—	—		non-album single
"Standard" (KitschKrieg featuring Trettmann, Gringo, Ufo361 and Gzuz)	2018	1	2	18	BVMI: Platinum; IFPI AUT: Gold	non-album single

== Other charted songs ==
Title	Year	Peak chart positions			Album
Title	Year	GER	AUT	SWI	Album
"Kontostand"	2018	49	49	84	808
"Erober die Welt" (featuring RAF Camora and Gzuz)	2018	51	33	79	808
"Stay High"	2018	60	57	—	808
"Alpträume"	2018	63	64	—	808
"Odio" (featuring Yung Hurn)	2018	77	54	—	808
"Dream" (featuring Trettmann)	2018	78	—	—	808
"Gewinn"	2018	79	—	—	808
"Superstar"	2018	81	—	—	808
"Sprite" (featuring Rich the Kid)	2018	78	—	—	VVS
"Verändert"	2018	82	—	—	VVS
"Palmen"	2018	90	—	—	VVS
"Lost" (featuring Yung Hurn)	2019	18	15	—	Wave
"Richard Millie"	2019	—	—	38	Wave
"04:30"	2019	49	17	39	Wave
"Schwarz & Weiss" (with Ezhel)	2019	—	49	—	Lights Out
"Zweifel" (with Sonus030)	2020	12	19	45	Nur für dich
"Anders" (with Sonus030)	2020	—	40	92	Nur für dich

== Guest appearances ==
List of non-single guest appearances, with other performing artists, showing year released and album name
Title	Year	Other artist(s)	Album
"Hoodrich"	2011	Said, Kalusha	Said
"Brett, Pt. 2"	2015	Blut & Kasse	Machermodus
"Frisch aus der Küche"	2015	Haftbefehl, Capo	Unzensiert
"Money"	2017	RAF Camora	Anthrazit
"Na Na Na"	2017	Capital Bra	Blyat
"Wach auf"	2017	Joshi Mizu	Kaviar & Toast
"Money"	2017	RAF Camora	Anthrazit RR
"Fake Love"	2018	Olexesh	Rolexesh
