= Murda (rapper) =

Turkish-Dutch rapper

- Also known as: Murda Turk; Murdaworld
- Born: Önder Doğan; 30 January 1984 (age 42); Amsterdam, Netherlands
- Genres: Hip hop; trap
- Occupations: Rapper; singer; songwriter
- Years active: 2007–present

Önder Doğan (Turkish: [ˈœndæɾ doˈan]; born 30 January 1984), better known by his stage name Murda, is a Turkish-Dutch rapper, singer and songwriter. He is known for his collaboration with fellow rapper Ezhel and MERO on various songs. Born in Amsterdam-Noord, Onder Dogan was the son of theater professionals parents. They moved to Madrid when he was little, where he went to the international school, before relocating to Istanbul. Dogan then discovered hip-hop through his cousin.

== Discography ==
=== Studio albums ===
- DUA (2025)
- Made in Turkey (ft. Ezhel) (2020)
- DOĞA (2020)
- BABA (2019)
- Bruin Brood (2017) (ft. BangBros & Hef)
- We Doen Ons Best (2016)

=== Singles and EPs ===
- Hot Baklava (2023) (Geenaro & Ghana Beats, Summer Cem, Ezhel)
- Ararım Yarın (feat. MERO) (2023)
- Fıstık (2023)
- Konum Gizli (feat. MERO) (2023)
- Spring Break (2023) (ft. BILLA JOE & VØGUE)
- Sen Dönene Kadar (2023) (ft. Hadise)
- Salt Bae (2022)
- Tarif (2022) (ft. Yung Ouzo)
- Bela (2022)
- RARRii (2022)
- İmdat (2022) (ft. Hadise)
- Konum Gizli (2022) (ft. Mero)
- RS (2022) (ft. Bartofso & Uzi)
- Harbiye (2022) (ft. Tabitha)
- LE CANE (RMX) (2022) (ft. Muti, Summer Cem, Uzi, Critical & Heijan)
- Banana (2022) (ft. Kempi)
- OHA (2021) (ft. Summer Cem)
- Denedim (2021)
- Kafeste (2021)
- Gece Gündüz (2021) (ft. Mero)
- Made in Turkey (2020) (ft. Ezhel)
- NAPIYON LAN (2020) (ft. SFB)
- Temiz (2020) (ft. Spanker & Josylvio)
- Bi Sonraki Hayatımda Gel (2020) (with Ezhel)
- Was machst du (2020) (ft. Eno)
- Big Money (2020) (ft. Mario Cash)
- Eh Baba (2020)
- Nereye Kadar (2020)
- AYA (2019) (ft. Ezhel)
- Boynumdaki Chain (2019) (ft. Ezhel)
- Blitzkrieg (2019) (ft. Carnage & NAAZAAR)
- Drop Top (2019) (ft. Zefanio & Priceless)
- Stretch (2019) (ft. Bizzey & Kraantje Pappie)
- Paraplu (2019) (ft. Kevin)
- Runnin' (2019) (ft. Jonna Fraser)
- Rompe (2019) (ft. Priceless & Frenna)
- Pistola (2018) (ft. ICE & Yung Felix)
- Again (2018) (ft. Makkie)
- Soon (2018) (ft. Philly Moré & Frenna)
- Shutdown (2018) (ft. SFB)
- ISSA (2018) (ft. Yawenthoo & Vic9)
- Gasolina (2018) (ft. Lange & Djaga Djaga)
- Helemaal Niks (2017) (ft. BangBros & Hef)
- Poenie Onderweg (2017) (ft. BangBros & Hef)
- Wejo (2017) (ft. BangBros & Hef)
- Zomersessie 2017 – 101Barz (2017) (ft. BangBros & Hef)
- Trabajo (2017)
- Zwaai (2017) (ft. BangBros, Hef & Bizzey)
- Culé (2017)
- Brand New (2017) (ft. Jonna Fraser & Jandino Asporaat)
- London (2016) (ft. Raynor Bruges)
- Watch Me (2016) (ft. Raynor Bruges)
- Niet Zo (DJ DYLVN Remix) (2016) (with Ronnie Flex & DJ DYLVN)
- Doutzen (2015) (with Psyko Punkz)
- In De Wissel (2015)
- De Macht (2015)
- Niet Iedereen Bestaat (2015)
- Goeie Dingen (2014)
- Stoner (2014) (with Endymion)
- Love This Life (2013) (with Psyko Punkz)
- Trippy Hippie (2013) (with Psyko Punkz)
- FTS (2007) (with Showtek)

=== Charts ===
Year	Act	Number	Netherlands		Notes
Year	Act	Number	100	week	Notes
2016	Murda feat. Ronnie Flex	Niet zo	55	21	
2017	Murda feat. Jonna Fraser and Jandino Asporaat	Brand New	24	9	top 2 in the Dutch Top 40
2017	Murda feat. Ronnie Flex, Abira, Def Major and Jiri11	Dichterbij me	60	1	
2017	Murda	Culé	100	1	
2017	Murda	Trabajo	73	2	
2017	Murda feat. Bangbros, Hef and Kevin	Wejo	76	2	
2018	Murda feat. Lange, Djaga Djaga and Yung Felix	Gasolina	51	2	
2018	Murda feat. SFB and Spanker	Shutdown	5	22	top 2 in the Top 40
2018	Murda feat. Philly Moré and Frenna	Soon	89	1	
2018	Murda feat. Sevn Alias, Jayh and Cho	Soldaat	74	1	
2019	Murda feat. Hef and Jayh	Rodeo	58	1	
2019	Murda feat. Priceless and Frenna	Rompe	1	24	no. 16 in the Top 40
2019	Murda feat. Jonna Fraser	Runnin'	57	2	
2019	Murda feat. Kevin	Paraplu	65	3	
2019	Murda feat. Kraantje Pappie and Bizzey	Stretch	54	2	
2019	Murda feat. Idaly and Sevn Alias	IJs	48	3	
