= List of Dutch Top 40 number-one singles of 2015 =

Below is a list of the Dutch Top 40 number-one singles of 2015. The Dutch Top 40 is a chart that ranks the best-performing singles of the Netherlands. It is published every week by radio station Radio 538.

== Chart history ==
Issue date	Song	Artist(s)	Ref.
January 3	"Thinking Out Loud"	Ed Sheeran	
January 10	"Thinking Out Loud"	Ed Sheeran	
January 17	"Runaway (U & I)"	Galantis	
January 24	"Cheerleader" (Felix Jaehn Remix)	OMI	
January 31	"Cheerleader" (Felix Jaehn Remix)	OMI	
February 7	"Cheerleader" (Felix Jaehn Remix)	OMI	
February 14	"Cheerleader" (Felix Jaehn Remix)	OMI	
February 21	"Cheerleader" (Felix Jaehn Remix)	OMI	
February 28	"Cheerleader" (Felix Jaehn Remix)	OMI	
March 7	"Cheerleader" (Felix Jaehn Remix)	OMI	
March 14	"Cheerleader" (Felix Jaehn Remix)	OMI	
March 21	"Cheerleader" (Felix Jaehn Remix)	OMI	
March 28	"Cheerleader" (Felix Jaehn Remix)	OMI	
April 4	"Cheerleader" (Felix Jaehn Remix)	OMI	
April 11	"Lean On"	Major Lazer and DJ Snake featuring MØ	
April 18	"Lean On"	Major Lazer and DJ Snake featuring MØ	
April 25	"Parijs"	Kenny B	
May 2	"Parijs"	Kenny B	
May 9	"Parijs"	Kenny B	
May 16	"Parijs"	Kenny B	
May 23	"Parijs"	Kenny B	
May 30	"Parijs"	Kenny B	
June 6	"Parijs"	Kenny B	
June 13	"Lean On"	Major Lazer and DJ Snake featuring MØ	
June 20	"Lean On"	Major Lazer and DJ Snake featuring MØ	
June 27	"Drank & drugs"	Lil' Kleine & Ronnie Flex	
July 4	"Drank & drugs"	Lil' Kleine & Ronnie Flex	
July 11	"Drank & drugs"	Lil' Kleine & Ronnie Flex	
July 18	"Ain't Nobody (Loves Me Better)"	Felix Jaehn featuring Jasmine Thompson	
July 25	"El Perdón"	Nicky Jam & Enrique Iglesias	
August 1	"El Perdón"	Nicky Jam & Enrique Iglesias	
August 8	"El Perdón"	Nicky Jam & Enrique Iglesias	
August 15	"El Perdón"	Nicky Jam & Enrique Iglesias	
August 22	"El Perdón"	Nicky Jam & Enrique Iglesias	
August 29	"El Perdón"	Nicky Jam & Enrique Iglesias	
September 5	"How Deep Is Your Love"	Calvin Harris and Disciples	
September 12	"How Deep Is Your Love"	Calvin Harris and Disciples	
September 19	"What Do You Mean?"	Justin Bieber	
September 26	"What Do You Mean?"	Justin Bieber	
October 3	"What Do You Mean?"	Justin Bieber	
October 10	"What Do You Mean?"	Justin Bieber	
October 17	"What Do You Mean?"	Justin Bieber	
October 24	"What Do You Mean?"	Justin Bieber	
October 31	"Hello"	Adele	
November 7	"Hello"	Adele	
November 14	"Hello"	Adele	
November 21	"Hello"	Adele	
November 28	"Hello"	Adele	
December 5	"Sorry"	Justin Bieber	
December 12	"Sorry"	Justin Bieber	
December 19	"Sorry"	Justin Bieber	
December 26	"Sorry"	Justin Bieber	

== Number-one artists ==
Position	Artist	Weeks #1
1	Felix Jaehn	12
2	OMI	11
3	Justin Bieber	10
4	Kenny B	7
5	Nicky Jam	6
5	Enrique Iglesias	6
6	Adele	5
7	Major Lazer	4
7	DJ Snake	4
7	MØ	4
8	Lil' Kleine	3
8	Ronnie Flex	3
9	Calvin Harris	2
9	Disciples	2
9	Ed Sheeran	2
10	Galantis	1
10	Jasmine Thompson	1

== See also ==
- 2015 in music
