= Monica Geuze =

Dutch television presenter and former vlogger

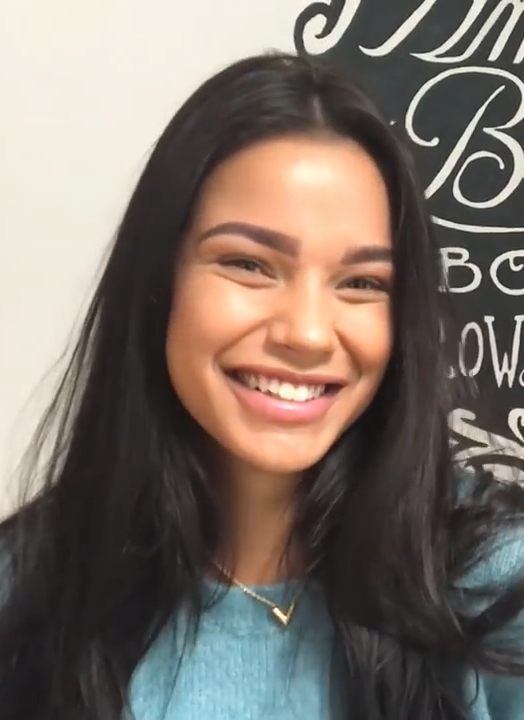
- Born: Monica Rosanne Irene Quirine Geuze; 27 March 1995 (age 31); Zwijndrecht, Netherlands
- Occupations: Influencer; Presenter; Vlogger; DJ

Monica Geuze (born 27 March 1995) is a Dutch television presenter and former vlogger and DJ. She presented the shows Love Island, Temptation Island: Love or Leave and De Bachelorette. Geuze is also a jury member in the television show The Masked Singer.

== Career ==
=== Early career ===
Geuze appeared in the music video of the song Happy Family of the 2005 album Another Day by the Dutch band Racoon. At age 16, she became DJ for rapper Ronnie Flex. She released the single Laten Gaan in 2015 in collaboration with Ronnie Flex, Mafe, Frenna, Emms and Abira. In 2016, Geuze released the single Nu of nooit in collaboration with Ruben Annink and Jonna Fraser.

=== Vlogging / YouTube / Social media ===
Geuze published her first vlog about her daily life in August 2014. She published over a thousand videos on her YouTube channel and, as of November 2025, her channel has over 525,000 subscribers. She stopped with vlogging in January 2023. In November 2025, she removed her vlog videos from her YouTube channel as she no longer agrees with all of the contents.

She was also one of the presenters of the YouTube channel Concentrate by RTL.

Geuze finished in third place in The Best Social 100, a list of hundred best content creators, at the 2026 The Best Social Awards.

=== Television / Videoland ===
In 2019, Geuze presented a season of Love Island which aired on Videoland. Geuze and Kaj Gorgels presented the show Temptation Island: Love or Leave which also aired on Videoland. In 2023, she presented the show De Bachelorette. In the same year, she became a jury member in the television show The Masked Singer. In 2024, Geuze was one of the presenters of the show Boxing Influencers which aired on Videoland. She was also one of the presenters of Boxing Influencers in 2025.

She was nominated for the Televizier-Ring Talent award in 2021, 2023 and 2024.

Geuze and Valerio Zeno present the show Power Couple in which couples compete against each other. In the summer of 2025, she appeared in the evening edition of RTL Boulevard, titled RTL Boulevard Summernight.

In 2026, she became one of the presenters of the ninth season of the show Kopen Zonder Kijken after Martijn Krabbé was no longer able to present the show due to his health. Krabbé did the voice-over and the show was presented by multiple presenters. In the show, people purchase a home without having seen it first and the team of Kopen Zonder Kijken makes all relevant decisions based on budget and preferences.

Since October 2026, Geuze and Edson da Graça present the game show Nederlands Domste. Since October 2026, Geuze and Valerio Zeno present a new season of Boxing Stars, a show in which Dutch celebrities compete in boxing matches.

=== Podcast ===
Geuze and Kaj Gorgels host the podcast Geuze & Gorgels. The podcast was nominated for best podcast in the category Chatcast Vermaak at the 2025 Dutch Podcast Awards. Together they also host the podcast Geuze & Gorgels Extra.

=== Television appearances ===
In 2017, Geuze appeared in the first season of the show Kroongetuige in which contestants have to solve a fictional murder case. She was interviewed by Peter van der Vorst in a 2017 episode of Van der Vorst ziet sterren. Geuze appeared in a 2017 episode of the game show Een goed stel hersens and a 2018 episode of the game show De Jongens tegen de Meisjes.

She travelled to Japan to get a tattoo for an episode of the 2018 television show Tattoo Trippers. She had the tattoo removed a few years later. Geuze appeared in 2018 episodes of the shows Het Jachtseizoen, The Big Music Quiz and Praat Nederlands met me. In 2020, she appeared in the quiz show De slimste mens. She appeared in a 2022 episode of the show Fout maar goud, a game show about guilty pleasures. Geuze finished in fourth place in the 2022 season of the show The Masked Singer. She was a contestant in the 2023 Halloween season of the show De Verraders. She also appeared in a 2023 episode of the show Het Jachtseizoen. Geuze is a guest in a 2026 episode of the show Yous & Yay in het wild by Yousef Gnaoui and Pepijn Lanen.

=== Books ===
Her autobiography My Way was published in May 2017. She also published a photo book titled Unreleased in 2021.

== Personal life ==
Her mother was born in Jakarta, Indonesia and her mother moved to the Netherlands when she was very young. Geuze was born in Zwijndrecht and she grew up in Hendrik-Ido-Ambacht. Her parents separated when she was 18 years old. She was in a relationship with Lil' Kleine which ended in 2016. She was in a relationship with footballer Lars Veldwijk and they have a daughter together. Their daughter was born in July 2018. Geuze and Veldwijk split up in November 2019. From April 2024 to August 2025, she was in a relationship with footballer James Lawrence.

== Selected filmography ==
=== As presenter ===
- Love Island (2019, Videoland)
- Temptation Island: Love or Leave (2020 – 2023, Videoland)
- De Bachelorette (2023 – present, Videoland)
- Power Couple (2024, Videoland)
- Boxing Influencers (2024, 2025, Videoland)
- Kopen Zonder Kijken (2026)
- Nederlands Domste (2026)
- Boxing Stars (2026, Videoland)

=== As herself ===
- Van der Vorst ziet sterren (2017)
- Like Monica (reality series, 2020 – 2021, Videoland)
- Drag Race Holland (2020)
- Isola di Beau (2022)
- RTL Boulevard Summernight (2025)
- Yous & Yay in het wild (2026)

=== As jury member ===
- The Masked Singer (2023 – present)

=== As contestant ===
- Kroongetuige (2017)
- Een goed stel hersens (2017)
- Tattoo Trippers (2018)
- Het Jachtseizoen (2018)
- The Big Music Quiz (2018)
- De Jongens tegen de Meisjes (2018)
- Praat Nederlands met me (2018)
- De Gevaarlijkste Wegen van de Wereld (2019)
- Vier Handen Op Eén Buik (2020)
- De slimste mens (2020)
- Fout maar goud (2022)
- The Masked Singer (2022)
- De Verraders (2023, Videoland)
- Het Jachtseizoen (2023)

== Discography ==
- Laten Gaan (2015, single, with Ronnie Flex, Mafe, Frenna, Emms and Abira)
- Nu of nooit (2016, single, with Ruben Annink and Jonna Fraser)

== Bibliography ==
- My Way (2017, autobiography)
- Unreleased (2021, photo book)
