= Wop! =

Studio album by Lil' Kleine
- Released: 12 February 2016
- Recorded: 2015
- Genre: Nederhop
- Length: 32:45
- Label: TopNotch
- Producer: Jack $hirak

Lil' Kleine chronology
Wop! (2016)	Alleen (2017)

Wop! is the debut studio album by Dutch hip-hop artist Lil' Kleine. It was produced by Jack $hirak and released on 12 February 2016 by TopNotch. Lil' Kleine collaborated with fellow rapper Ronnie Flex to produce most of the album's songs, and vocals from Frenna are also featured. Wop! entered the Album Top 100 at the number 1 position and remained there for nine weeks, and was certified platinum in April 2016.

== Background and release ==
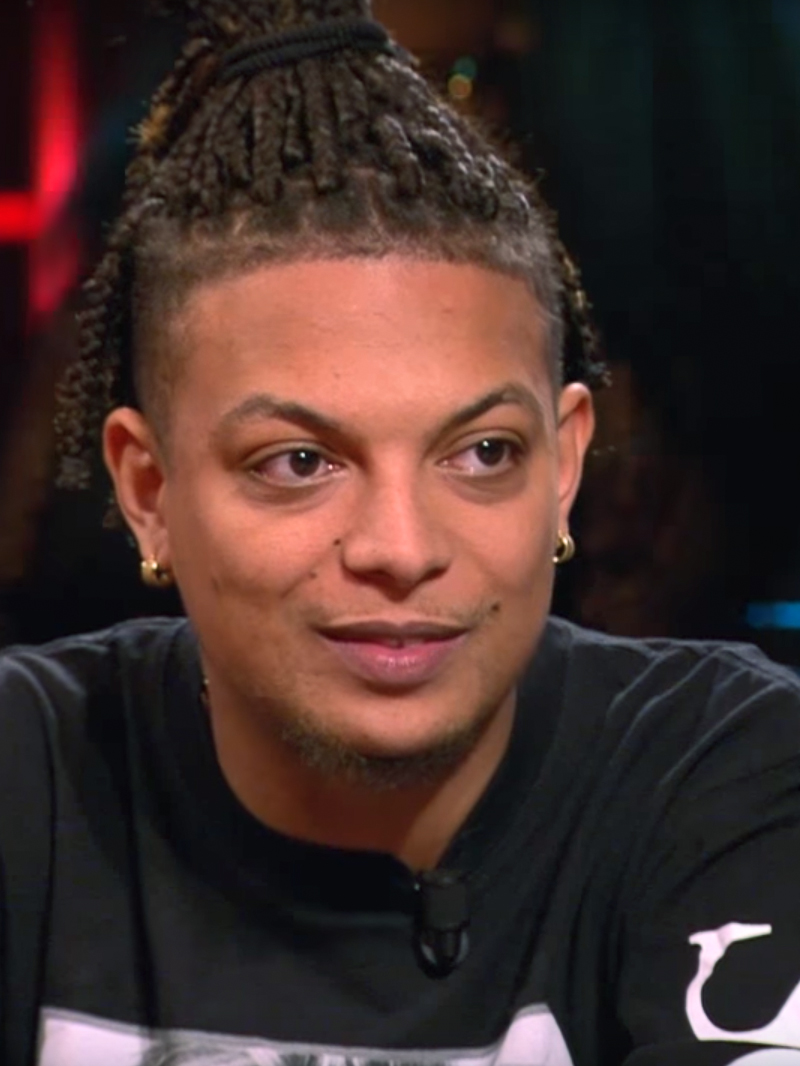
Ronnie Flex is a featured artist on seven of the album's tracks.

Wop! was produced by Jack $hirak and recorded by Lil' Kleine and, for the most part, Ronnie Flex, following the release of their number 1 single "Drank & Drugs". During the two weeks leading up to the release of the album, its label TopNotch published a series of videos on social media documenting the recording. Although the album was recorded largely by two artists, it was released on 12 February 2016 as a solo album because Flex was also working on his own album at the time and preferred to be seen as merely a featured artist.

In the album's first week, all eleven of its tracks ranked within the top 35 of the Single Top 100 and the album reached number 1 on the Album Top 100 – it is the first hip hop/rap album in the Netherlands to accomplish these feats. In addition, all of the album's tracks also ranked within Spotify’s Netherlands Top 50, with singles "Niet Omdat Het Moet" and "1, 2, 3" at numbers 1 and 2 respectively. "Niet Omdat Het Moet" received over half a million views on YouTube during its first few days, being the most viewed YouTube video in the Netherlands at the time. It also became the most-streamed new album on Spotify in Dutch history, being streamed over 1.5 million times during the 24 hours after its release.

== Critical reception ==
Gijsbert Kamer of de Volkskrant rated Wop! three stars out of five, describing it as "more house than hip hop" and having "a sound that is very much from 1993" which he compared to Robin S.'s "Show Me Love". He added: "While it all sounds catchy and compact, the question arises whether Jack $hirak can think of anything different". Dominic Straub of Nieuweplaat.nl gave $hirak praise, saying: "All in all, this solo album was nothing without Jack $hirak. Despite the many uses of the pan flute tune, he is a huge talent. WOP is fine; there are songs that can become huge hits". Margaret Steenbakker of ThePostOnline described Wop! as "a feel-good album which offers an ode to the good life".

== Track listing ==
All tracks are written by Ronell Plasschaert, Jorik Scholten and Julien Willemsen.

No.	Title	Length
1.	"Mist & Regen" (Fog & Rain)	3:16
2.	"Bericht" (Message; featuring Frenna)	2:15
3.	"Bel Me Op" (Call Me)	3:21
4.	"Stripclub" (Strip Club)	4:00
5.	"Zoveel" (So Many)	4:36
6.	"Niet Omdat Het Moet" (Not Because You Have To)	2:39
7.	"Zonder Reden" (Without Reason)	2:56
8.	"Drank & Drugs in de Tweede Kamer" (Booze & Drugs in the Second Room; skit)	0:50
9.	"1, 2, 3"	2:26
10.	"Zeg Dat Niet" (Don't Say That; Jack $hirak remix)	3:30
11.	"Goud" (Gold)	2:56

== Charts ==
=== Weekly charts ===
Chart (2016)	Peak position
Belgian Albums (Ultratop Flanders)	6
Dutch Albums (Album Top 100)	1

=== Year-end charts ===
Chart (2016)	Position
Belgian Albums (Ultratop Flanders)	84
Dutch Albums (Album Top 100)	4
Chart (2017)	Position
Belgian Albums (Ultratop Flanders)	151
Dutch Albums (Album Top 100)	39
Chart (2018)	Position
Dutch Albums (Album Top 100)	62
Chart (2019)	Position
Dutch Albums (Album Top 100)	74

== Certifications ==
Region	Certification	Certified units/sales
Netherlands (NVPI)	2× Platinum	80,000^{‡}
^{‡} Sales+streaming figures based on certification alone.
