= Skrr =

Skrr may refer to:

- "Skrr" (Yxng Bane song)
- "Skrr" (Kalim and Ufo361 song)
