= Wop (disambiguation) =

Wop is a pejorative slur for Italians.

Wop or WOP may also refer to:

- "Wop" (song), a song by J. Dash
- WOP!, a 2016 album by Lil' Kleine
- Worcestershire Parkway railway station, National Rail station code WOP
- World of Padman, a computer game
- World-Over Press, an information agency established by Devere Allen and his wife
- WOp (or WOP), a WWII era abbreviation for a wireless operator
- Wojska Ochrony Pogranicza, border protection troops in communist-era Poland

== People ==
- Wop Drumstead (1898–1946), American football player
- Wop May (1896–1952), Canadian flying ace in World War I
