= Bizzey =

Dutch hip hop performer and DJ

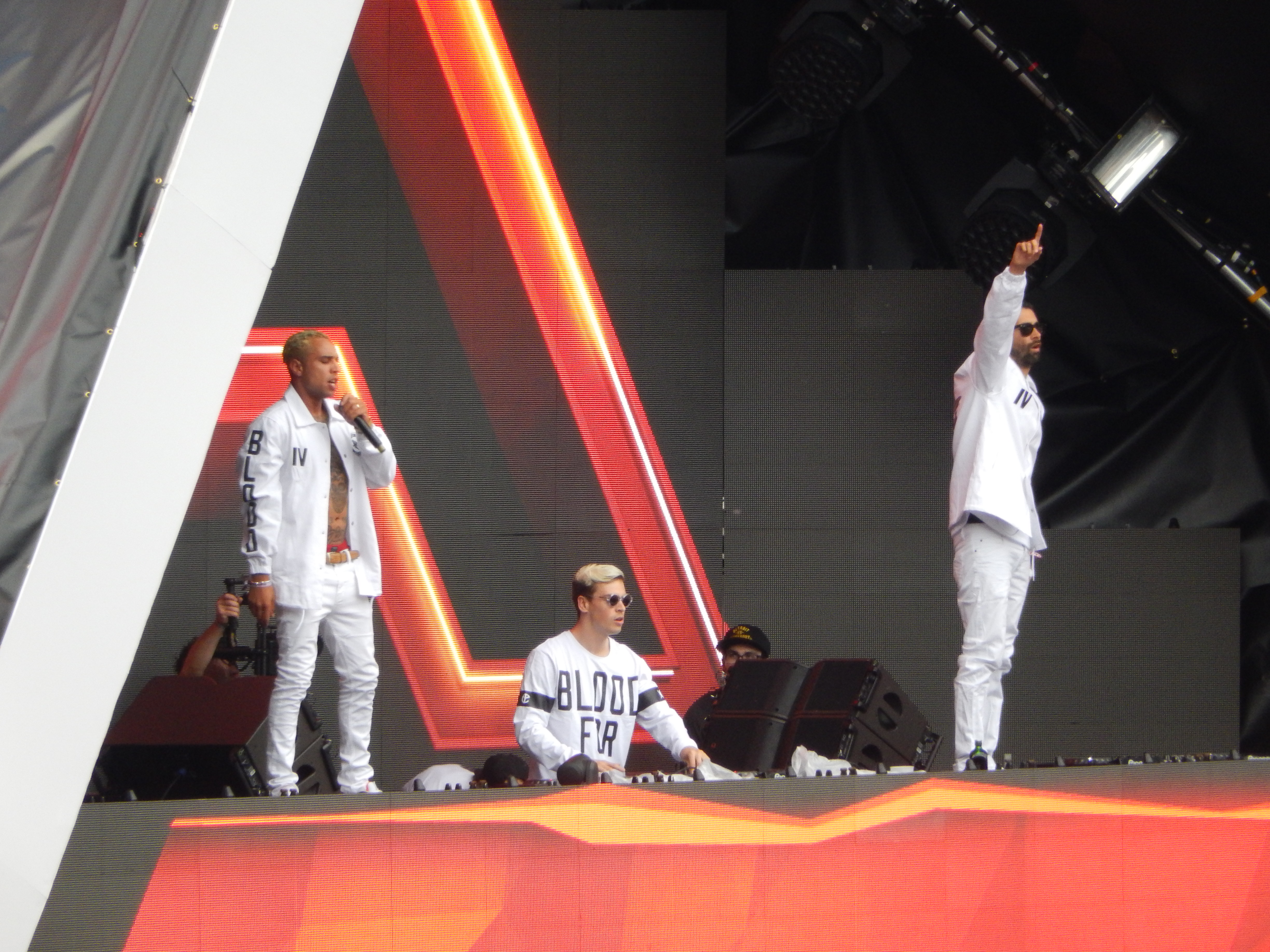
- Yellow Claw with Bizzey in 2015

Background information
- Born: Leendert Roelandschap; 11 May 1989 (age 37); Amersfoort, Netherlands
- Genre: Hip hop
- Occupations: Rapper, DJ
- Years active: 2010–present
- Website: http://bizzey.nl/

Leendert "Leo" Roelandschap (Amersfoort, 11 May 1989), better known by his stage name Bizzey, is a Dutch rapper and DJ.

== Biography ==
Bizzey was born in Amersfoort to a Dutch father and a Surinamese mother. He grew up in the Dutch towns Leusden and Amersfoort. His father owned a record shop in Amersfoort (Radio Roelandschap).

In 2010, Bizzey founded the group Yellow Claw together with Jim Aasgier (Jim Taihuttu) and Nizzle (Nils Rondhuis). They started off with a theme night in the Amsterdam night club Jimmy Woo and produced remixes for other performers. The group toured multiple countries and worked together with international artists. Bizzey left Yellow Claw in 2016 to focus on a solo career as MC Bizzey, mostly in the Netherlands. His YouTube video "Traag" ("Slow") received millions of views (and was especially popular in Turkey).

From the end of 2017 until November 2018, Bizzey was the manager of artist Famke Louise, whom he helped with the start of her career.

In June 2019, Bizzey won a FunX Music Award in the category Artist of the year - male.

== Discography ==
=== Albums ===
Year	Title	NL 100		BE 200	
Year	Title	Peak	Weeks	Peak	Weeks
2018	November	1	66	67	7
2019	Tido	2	27	41	4
2023	Four Juno	41	1	—	—

=== Singles ===
Year	Title	NL 100	
Year	Title	Peak	Weeks
2006	"The Fur"	60	3
2006	"Still Care"	95	2
2007	"This Way (Too Many Times)" (featuring Don Diablo)	28	5
2010	"Stronger" (featuring Bassjackers)	97	2
2016	"Challas" (featuring Mula B and Louis)	67	3
2017	"De manier" (featuring Kraantje Pappie)	22	16
2017	"Doe je dans" (featuring Yung Felix, Jozo, Adje and YOUNGBAEKANSIE)	97	1
2017	"Traag" (featuring Jozo and Kraantje Pappie)	22	46
2017	"Badman Ollo" (featuring Yung Felix, Josylvio and 3robi)	59	22
2017	"Shaka Zulu" (featuring Yung Felix, Josylvio, Hef and Delivio Reavon)	78	1
2017	"C'est la vie" (featuring The Partysquad, Josylvio, Hansie and Broertje)	26	16
2017	"Blow It All" (featuring Frenna, Ramiks, Diquenza and Dovgh)	35	8
2017	"Merry" (featuring Nafthaly Ramona and Hef)	20	20
2018	"Ja!" (featuring Kraantje Pappie, Chivv and Yung Felix)	1	23
2018	"Ewa" (featuring Mula B and LouiVos)	25	13
2018	"Girl Girl" (featuring Sterre)	50	2
2018	"Rock Ya Body" (featuring Josylvio)	60	1
2018	"PumPumPum" (featuring Josylvio and Yung Felix)	61	1
2018	"Dom doen" (featuring Broertje and D-Double)	66	1
2018	"Net als toen" (featuring Jonna Fraser)	67	1
2018	"Doe het voor"	72	1
2018	"Ding ding ding" (featuring Jozo and YOUNGBAEKANSIE)	75	1
2018	"Rakata" (featuring Mr. Polska and Kippie)	81	1
2018	"Millie's" (featuring Chivv)	84	1
2018	"Gunman"	96	1
2018	"Ze willen mee" (featuring Hardwell, Lil' Kleine and Chivv)	4	24
2018	"Bom 't" (featuring Jayh, Mula B and Dopebwoy)	42	6
2018	"Aventura"	82	1
2018	"Drama" (featuring Boef)	1	34
2018	"Zij wilt meer" (featuring LouiVos)	93	1
2018	"Wine Slow (Remix)" (featuring Idaly, Ronnie Flex and Famke Louise)	3	34
2018	"Maria" (featuring Ronnie Flex)	10	16
2018	"My Money" (featuring Jack $hirak, Bokoesam and Dopebwoy)	36	11
2018	"ASS" (featuring Idaly and Mula B)	74	1
2018	"Ik heb je nodig" (featuring Kraantje Pappie and Jonna Fraser)	11	12
2018	"Culo" (featuring Frenna, KM and Ramiks)	1	27
2018	"Coca" (featuring Yung Felix, Josylvio and Rockywhereyoubeen)	13	5
2018	"Hij is van mij" (featuring Kris Kross Amsterdam, Maan and Tabitha)	1	72
2018	"Positie" (featuring Caza)	24	30
2019	"Drup" (featuring Kraantje Pappie, Jonna Fraser and Ramiks)	2	25
2019	"Fuego" (featuring Kraantje Pappie and Rockywhereyoubeen)	68	1
2019	"Baby Momma" (featuring Yung Felix and Poke)	4	24
2019	"Dip raar" (featuring Diplo and Ramiks)	33	2
2019	"Insta" (featuring Kevin)	25	3
2019	"Last Man Standing" (featuring Yung Felix, Chivv and Kraantje Pappie)	7	15
2019	"Money Monica" (featuring Hansie and JoeyAK)	52	2
2019	"Domme dingen doen" (featuring Diquenza, Sxteen and Poke)	28	4
2019	"S/O naar de ..." (featuring Ramiks)	12	10
2019	"Zielige gozer" (featuring Kevin)	20	6
2019	"Stretch" (featuring Murda and Kraantje Pappie)	54	2
2019	"Mapima" (featuring Kevin, LouiVos and Yung Felix)	27	6
2019	"Hup" (featuring SFB)	10	17
2019	"Baila Mami" (featuring Josylvio and YOUNGBAEKANSIE)	48	2
2019	"Linkerbaan" (featuring 3robi)	85	1
2019	"Fast" (featuring Mula B and LouiVos)	61	1
2019	"Laat je niet gaan" (featuring Idaly)	62	2
2019	"Wij Rulen de nacht" (featuring Ashafar and Ramiks)	86	1
2020	"Skaffa" (featuring Donnie and Poke)	60	3
2020	"Video Vixen" (featuring Bilal Wahib)	5	27
2020	"Hola Kitty" (with Elettra Lamborghini and La$$a)	—	—
2020	"Doorheen" (featuring Bilal Wahib, Ronnie Flex and Ramiks)	15	7
2020	"Becky" (featuring Yung Felix, Josylvio and Tallem)	45	2
2020	"Angel" (featuring Numidia)	91	1
2022	"Hockeymeisjes" (featuring Kraantje Pappie and Immo)	67	1
2022	"Zo Fly (Met je naar de club)"	65	1
2023	"Zin in de zomer man" (with Kraantje Pappie and Rolf Sanchez)	8	11
2023	"Spagaat" (with Sick & Nimon and Kraantje Pappie)	76	1
2024	"Weekend"	59	4
2025	"Beneden" (with Ronnie Flex and Russo)	9	2
2026	"Anne" (Beste Zangers 2026)	13	2
