= Full Faça =

Studio album by Büyük Ev Ablukada
- Released: December 21, 2012
- Genre: Indie
- Length: 39:04
- Label: Olmadı Kaçarız

Büyük Ev Ablukada chronology
Full Faça (2012)	Ay Şuram Hâlâ Ağrıyo (2017)

Full Faça (Full Thug) is the first studio album by Turkish indie rock group Büyük Ev Ablukada, released on 21 December 2012. The album's CD, vinyl, and digital releases were managed by the band's own production company, Olmadı Kaçarız. After Büyük Ev Ablukada became known for their acoustic concerts, this album marked their first release in an electronic-infused form.

== Track listing ==
Lyrics for all songs are in the Turkish language.

No.	Title	Length
1.	"Havadar"	4:16
2.	"Nasıl İstediysen Öyle İşte"	3:52
3.	"Takıl Yani Takmıyo Belli"	1:47
4.	"Çıldırmicam"	1:57
5.	"Olanla Olunmaz"	3:44
6.	"İkimizin Oralar"	3:56
7.	"Ne Var Ne Yok"	5:04
8.	"Bi Hıçkırık Gibi"	2:58
9.	"En Güzel Yerinde Evin"	4:01
10.	"Bil"	3:51
11.	"Tayyar Ahmet'in Sonsuz Sayılı Günleri"	6:17
Total length:		39:04
