= Till Monkeys Fly =

Studio album by Racoon
- Released: January 2000
- Genre: Rock
- Label: SonyMusic Holland

Racoon chronology
Till Monkeys Fly (2000)	Here We Go, Stereo (2001)

Till Monkeys Fly is a debut album by the Dutch rock band Racoon. It was recorded in the ICP Studios, Brussels. It was first released in January 2000.

== Track listing ==
1. "Hilarious"
2. "By Your Side"
3. "Daily News"
4. "Smoothly"
5. "Impossible"
6. "Feel Like Flying"
7. "Ice Cream Time"
8. "Blue Days"
9. "World on a Plate"
10. "Rapid Eye Movement"
11. "Shooting Star"
12. "Particular"

== Chart positions ==
Chart (2000–2001)	Peak position
Dutch Albums (Album Top 100)	60

== Certifications ==
Region	Certification	Certified units/sales
Netherlands (NVPI)	Gold	40,000^{^}
^{^} Shipments figures based on certification alone.
