= Ezhel =

Turkish rapper

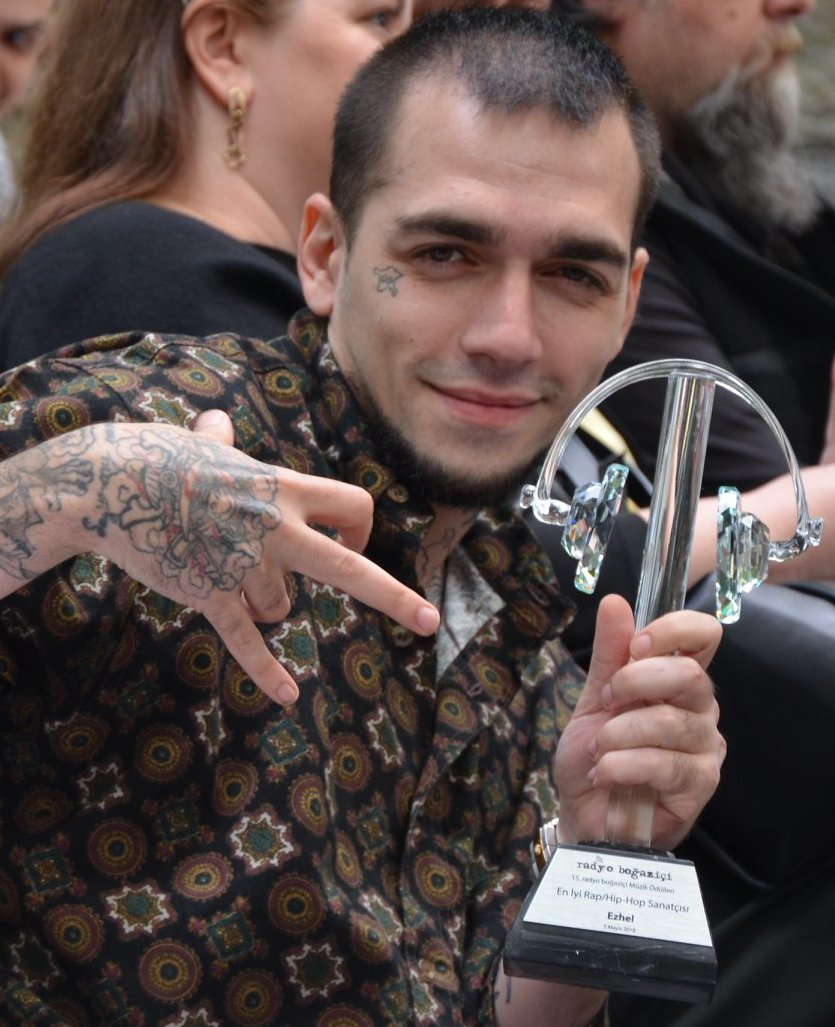
- Ezhel in 2018
- Born: Sercan İpekçioğlu; 1 July 1991 (age 35)
- Other names: CJ; Ais Ezhel; Ice Ezhel
- Citizenship: Turkey
- Occupations: Rapper; singer; songwriter
- Years active: 2008–present
- Musical career
- Genres: Hip hop; reggae; trap
- Instrument: Vocals
- Labels: VooDoo; KOAL

Sercan İpekçioğlu (born 1 July 1991), better known by his stage name Ezhel is a Turkish rapper and singer whose music blends trap, hip hop and reggae. His song "AYA" has been streamed more than 80 million times on Spotify. He has been given the title "Freestyle King" by Hip Hop Life.

== Life and career ==
Ezhel came from a musical family. His mother was an Anatolian folk dancer,his cousin Umut Kuzey Hanoğlu is a producer,and his uncle was a musician and sound and light engineer. He received a scholarship to TED school and began listening to American rappers like Eminem, 50 Cent, and Tupac Shakur. In addition to Turkish, Ezhel also speaks the basics of the northern Kurdish language Kurmanji, and he incorporates Kurdish lyrics and themes into his songs, often referencing Kurdishness and his cultural identity.

At the age of 12, Ezhel developed an interest in rap music. By 15, he dropped out of high school to pursue his passion for music. He later discovered Bob Marley, which deeply influenced him and introduced him to the philosophy of Rastafari. Ezhel has noted that he combined the rebellious spirit he learned from rap with the philosophy of Rastafarianism.

At 18, he began performing with a reggae band called Afra Tafra. After this group split, he formed his own reggae band, Kökler Filizleniyor, along with some of his friends from Ankara. He performed under the name Ais Ezhel until 2017. His stage name, Ais Ezhel, is derived from the English word "ice," reflecting his creative approach to language and identity.

Ezhel can also play the bağlama and guitar and sings reggae with the band Kökler Filizleniyor. His debut album, Müptezhel, came out in 2017.

Ezhel was arrested on 24 May 2018 and sent to pretrial detention accused of "inciting drug use" in his songs. On 19 June, Ezhel was acquitted within 9 minutes of the opening of his first trial hearing. Ezhel's lawyer, Fuat Ekin, stated that, "We got an acquittal. We can say that justice has been done," according to the Media and Law Studies Association (MLSA).

In May 2019, The New York Times named Ezhel among the European pop acts that everyone should know.

Due to ongoing lawsuits against him, Ezhel has been residing in Berlin, the capital of Germany, since 2019. When asked on a program why he hasn't returned to Turkey, he responded, "I believe that if I were to go, I would likely be arrested."

Ezhel sparked a major controversy following his participation in a Twitter chat program, during which he asserted, "I stand up for Kurdistan and the Kurdish people, but I hold the belief that the capital of Kurdistan is already Ankara, Istanbul. I hold the conviction that this issue will find a resolution in some way." His statement swiftly went viral across social media platforms, provoking intense reactions. Consequently, Ezhel was subjected to accusations of being a "terrorist" and a "supporter of the PKK." Ezhel took to Twitter to address the situation, stating, "To those who spread animosity, my fellow citizens. Where should the capital be, excuse me? Please don't misrepresent my words. The essence of my statement is as follows (though you may choose not to share this or wish to comprehend): The capital of our nation is Ankara, irrespective of any particular region."

== Cultural and Religious Identity ==
Ezhel has frequently discussed his ethnic roots and cultural connections. In a public statement, he mentioned, “I speak Kurdish, yes, and I share posts about Amedspor. I love this country in a way you’ve never tried to love it.” His vocal support for the Kurdish people and cultural identity has sparked significant debate.

During another interview, Ezhel added, “Rum (Greeks) have already left, Armenians have already left, and if the Kurds leave, my heart will no longer bear it.” His remarks reflect his advocacy for Turkey's cultural diversity and coexistence. Similarly, in August 2025 Ezhel responded to an Instagram post regarding the mentions of "Turks" in the national anthems of Greece, Hungary, Turkmenistan and Cyprus by stating that he was ashamed of his Turkishness:

When one realizes that they have oppressed others, they can regain the power they lost in their Turkishness. These anthems were written because we took pleasure in oppression. Let us be remembered for justice. Then we will have served our nationality. Let us acknowledge our mistakes. How much further can we progress while taking pride in killing people? As long as nobility, justice, and happiness do not come to mind when one thinks of a Turk, I am ashamed of my Turkishness. This is how it is. (Note: Translated from the original Turkish: "Başkalarına zulmettiğini farkettiğinde Türklük kaybettiği gücüne yeniden ulaşabilir. Zulümden keyif aldığımız için yazıldı bu marşlar. Adaletle anılalım. O zaman milliyetimize hizmet etmiş olacağız. Hatalarımızı kabul edelim. İnsan kesmekle gurur duyarak daha ne kadar ilerleyebiliriz? Türk deyince akla asalet adalet ve mutluluk gelmedikçe ben türklüğümden utanç duyuyorum. Böyledir".)

On the topic of religion, Ezhel shared in a 2018 live broadcast that he was not a Christian. However, in subsequent years, he publicly declared that he had converted to Christianity, a decision that sparked conversations among his fans and followers.

Ezhel's music, cultural stance, and personal journey continue to influence and inspire, making him a central figure in Turkish and global music scenes.

== Discography ==
Studio albums

- Müptezhel (2017)
- Lights Out (ft. Ufo361) (2019)
- Made in Turkey (ft. Murda) (2020)
- Derdo (2024)

Singles

- Pelesenk (ft. Aga B) (2012)
- Antrenman (ft. Kamufle, Aga B & Harun Adil) (2012)
- Psikokramp (ft. Red) (2012)
- SBAG (ft. Aga B, Funk'd Up & Dj Suppa)
- 3 Gün (2013)
- Façamızı Kes (2015)
- Ateşi Yak (ft. Aga B) (2016)
- Gerçek Sandım (ft. Sansar Salvo) (2016)
- Kayip Nesil (ft. Kamufle & Aga B) (2016)
- İmkansızım (2017)
- Kazıdık Tırnaklarla (2018)
- KAFA10 (ft. Anıl Piyancı) (2018)
- Felaket (2019)
- 3500 (ft. Aga B) (2019)
- Summer of My Life (ft. Gringo, Yung Kafa ve Kücük Efendi) (2019)
- ne deve ne kush (ft. Büyük Ev Ablukada) (2019)
- Boynumdaki Chain (ft. Murda) (2019)
- Olay (2019)
- Lolo (2019)
- Aya (ft. Murda) (2019)
- Pırlanta (ft. Murda) (2019)
- Mon Ami (ft. Eno) (2019)
- Bi Sonraki Hayatımda Gel (ft. Murda) (2020)
- Limit Yok (ft. Patron, Anıl Piyancı, Sansar Salvo, Allâme, Kamufle, Beta, Pit10) (2020)
- İz Bırak (ft. Vio) (2020)
- Jealous & Greedy (ft. OMG) (2020)
- Made in Turkey (ft. Murda) (2020)
- Devam (ft. Luciano & Gentleman) (2020)
- Allah'ından Bul (2020)
- LINK UP (ft. Kelvyn Colt) (2020)
- Melodien (ft. Newman) (2020)
- Not a day (ft. Patrice) (2021)
- Sakatat (2021)
- 4 Kanaken (ft. Haftbefehl, Capo, Veysel) (2021)
- Lifeline (ft. Gentleman) (2021)
- Astronaut In The Ocean - Ezhel Remix (ft. Masked Wolf) (2021)
- Bul Beni (2021)
- BENIM HAYALLER (ft. Luciano) (2021)
- End of Time (ft. Kelvyn Colt) (2021)
- Mayrig (2021)
- VIP (ft. Olexesh, Hell Yes) (2021)
- Hayrola (2021)
- Ağlattın (2022)
- Daima (2022)
- Nerdesin (2022)
- Kuğulu Park (2023)
- Paspartu (2023)
- Kontak (ft. Summer Cem) (2023)
- Oynar (2023)
- Taştan (ft. Summer Cem) (2023)
- Hot Baklava (ft. Summer Cem, Murda) (2023)
- Pofuduk (2023)
- Margiela (2023)
- Çevir Tavukları (ft. Lil Zey) (2024)
- LANNISTER (2024)
- MAD (2024)
- Kadehimi Boş Bırakma (2024)
- FaceTime (2024)
- Bridges (ft. Aitch) (2024)

== Awards ==
Year	Award	Category	Nominee	Result
2011	Hiphoplife Freestyle King II	King II	Ais Ezhel	Won
2018	15th Radio Boğaziçi Music Awards	Best Rap / Hip Hop Music Artist	Ezhel	Won
2018	Golden Butterfly Awards	Best Debut by an Artist	Ezhel	Won
2018	Golden Butterfly Awards	Song of the Year	"Geceler"	Nominated
2020	17th Radio Boğaziçi Music Awards	Best Duet	"AYA"	Won
2020	17th Radio Boğaziçi Music Awards	Best Album	Lights Out	Won
2020	17th Radio Boğaziçi Music Awards	Best Rap / Hip Hop Music Artist	Ezhel	Won
2022	Berlin Music Video Awards	Most Bizarre	AǦLATTIN	Nominated
