= Müptezhel =

Studio album by Ezhel
- Released: May 25, 2017
- Recorded: 2014–2017
- Genre: Trap, hip hop, reggae
- Length: 45:44
- Label: KOAL
- Producer: Bugy, DJ Artz, Ezhel

Ezhel chronology
Müptezhel (2017)	Lights Out (2019)

Müptezhel is the debut studio album of Turkish rapper Ezhel. It was released on May 25, 2017. The album contains 12 songs. It was produced by Bugy, DJ Artz and Ezhel.

== Track listing ==
No.	Title	Length
1.	"Alo" ("Hello!")	3:27
2.	"Geceler" ("Nights")	3:43
3.	"Benim Derdim" ("My Trouble")	4:41
4.	"İyi Bil" ("Know Well")	3:30
5.	"Nefret" ("Hate")	3:11
6.	"Şehrimin Tadı" ("The Taste of My City")	4:13
7.	"Hayır" ("No")	3:36
8.	"Alışamadım" ("I couldn't get used to")	2:33
9.	"Küvet" ("Bathtub")	4:59
10.	"Derman" ("Cure")	4:09
11.	"Bazen" ("Sometimes" ft. Emel)	3:51
12.	"Esrarengiz" ("Mysterious")	3:51
Total length:		45:44
