= Here We Go, Stereo =

Studio album by Racoon
- Released: October 2001
- Genre: Rock
- Label: Sony Music Holland

Racoon chronology
Till Monkeys Fly (2000)	Here We Go, Stereo (2001)	Another Day (2005)

Here We Go, Stereo is a second album by the Dutch rock band Racoon. It was first released in October 2001.

== Track listing ==
1. "Reach"
2. "Side Effects"
3. "Eric's Bar"
4. "Back You Up"
5. "Biggest Fan"
6. "World Without Worries"
7. "Water By The Bed"
8. "Tic Toc"
9. "Autumn Tunes"
10. "Wendy"
11. "Paper Home"
12. "Lukas Song"
13. "Hardcore Tapes"
