= Racoon (band) =

Dutch rock band

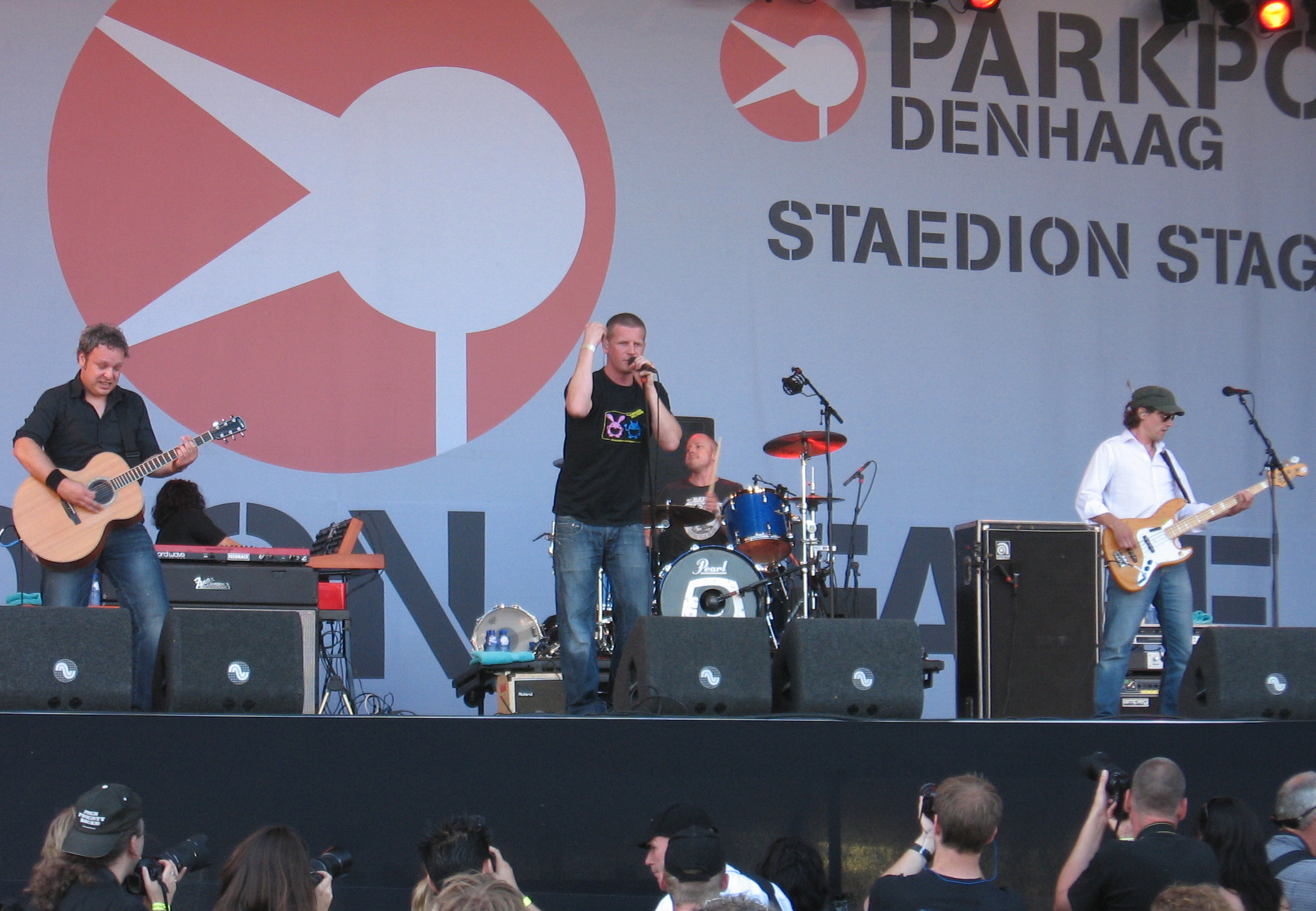
- Racoon at Parkpop, 2008

Background information
- Origin: Goes, Zeeland, Netherlands
- Genres: Pop rock
- Years active: 1997–present
- Labels: Sony Music, Roadrunner
- Members: Bart van der Weide; Dennis Huige; Maarten van Damme; Paul Bukkens
- Past members: Stefan de Kroon
- Website: www.racoon.nl

Racoon are a Dutch pop rock band from Goes, Zeeland, formed in 1997. The band's current lineup consists of vocalist Bart van der Weide, guitarist Dennis Huige, bassist Maarten van Damme and drummer Paul Bukkens. Stefan de Kroon was the bassist from 1998 to 2017.

The band experienced a breakthrough in 2005 with their third album Another Day and the single "Love You More", which reached number three on the Dutch Top 40 and became one of the biggest hits of the year. They have since recorded four number-one albums on the Dutch Albums Chart alongside the top ten singles "No Mercy", "Oceaan" and "Het is al laat toch". The band released their first Dutch-language album "Spijt is iets voor later" in 2021.

== History ==
Racoon started in 1997 as an acoustic duo made up of singer Bart van der Weide and guitarist Dennis Huige. The two previously played in a hardcore punk band named Vict'em, but left to make a different style of music. As a duo, they released three songs for a compilation by The Dutch Rock & Pop Institute. The band relocated to Utrecht in 1998, adding bassist Stefan de Kroon and drummer Paul Bukkens. Bukkens came up with the band name Racoon after watching a documentary about raccoons.

After self-releasing the demo It's an Ice Cream Day and playing the Noorderslag festival in 1999, the band received several offers and signed to Sony Music. They released two albums on Sony: Till Monkeys Fly (2000) and Here We Go, Stereo (2001). They had a few minor radio hits, but the band would later say that they view their second album with mixed feelings, as the label insisted on releasing a follow-up soon. When Marlboro asked Racoon to cover a favourite band for a "flashback tour", they chose Faith No More.

In 2002, Sony dropped Racoon because their head office in the United States wanted the label to dump all the Dutch bands. Now unsigned, singer Van der Weide worked as a garbage man for a year and a half before Racoon were picked up by an independent label, Play It Again Sam. Their third album, Another Day, was released in 2005 and sold 60,000 copies in the first year, more than their first two combined. The single "Love You More" reached number three on the Dutch Top 40, and was followed up by further top 40 hits "Laugh About It" and "Brother". Racoon played the main stage of the Pinkpop Festival in 2006. In 2007, they embarked on their first American tour, opening for The Lemonheads.

Racoon released their fourth album Before You Leave in 2008. Their fifth album Liverpool Rain, was released in 2011 and featured string arrangements recorded in Abbey Road Studios with the London Chamber Orchestra, arranged by Andrew Powell. The lead single "No Mercy" reached number three on the Dutch Top 40. In 2012, Racoon recorded "Oceaan", their first Dutch-language song, for the soundtrack to the film Alles is familie. It became their third top ten hit, peaking at number six. In 2013, they made the song "Shoes of Lighting" for NPO 3FM's Serious Request fundraiser, against child mortality from diarrhea. Their sixth album, All in Good Time, was released in 2015 and also went to number one on the Dutch Albums Chart. This was followed by Look Around and See the Distance in 2017, which was their last album with bassist Stefan de Kroon, who announced he would leave the band at the end of the year. De Kroon was succeeded by Maarten van Damme, formerly of the bands Abel and Rosemary's Sons.

In 2020, Racoon announced their first Dutch-language album, inspired by the death of Van der Weide's sister. Its lead single, "Het is al laat toch", peaked at number two on the Dutch Top 40 in 2020, their biggest hit yet. The album Spijt is iets voor later (2021) reached number one again. For their ninth album It Is What It Is (2024), the band returned to English songs, supported by the lead single "Nickel for Goodbye".

== Members ==
- Bart van der Weide – lead vocals (1997–present)
- Dennis Huige – guitars (1997–present)
- Maarten van Damme – bass (2017–present)
- Paul Bukkens – drums (1998–present)

Live member since 2006:

- Manu van Os – keyboards

=== Previous member(s) ===
- Stefan de Kroon – bass (1998–2017)

== Discography ==
=== Albums ===
Title	Album details	Peak chart positions		Certifications
Title	Album details	NL	BEL	Certifications
Till Monkeys Fly	Released: January 2000; Label: Sony Music; Formats: CD	60	—	NL: Gold
Here We Go, Stereo	Released: October 2001; Label: Sony Music; Formats: CD	62	—	
Another Day	Released: 12 April 2005; Label: Play It Again Sam; Formats: CD	2	—	NL: 3× Platinum
Before You Leave	Released: 8 March 2008; Label: Play It Again Sam; Formats: CD	2	—	NL: Gold
Liverpool Rain	Released: 6 May 2011; Label: Play It Again Sam; Formats: CD	1	109	NL: 2× Platinum
All in Good Time	Released: 20 February 2015; Label: Petrol; Formats: CD	1	—	NL: Platinum
Look Ahead and See the Distance	Released: 6 October 2017; Label: Play It Again Sam; Formats: CD	2	—	
Spijt is iets voor later	Released: 1 October 2021; Label: Sony Music; Formats: CD	1	41	NL: Platinum
It Is What It Is	Released: 3 October 2023; Label: Sony Music; Formats: CD	1	44	

=== Singles ===
Single	Year	Peak chart positions		Certifications	Album
Single	Year	Dutch Top 40	Single Top 100	Certifications	Album
"Feel Like Flying"	2000	—	69		Till Monkeys Fly
"Blue Days"	2000	—	84		Till Monkeys Fly
"Eric's Bar"	2001	—	97		Here We Go Stereo
"Happy Family"	2005	—	84		Another Day
"Love You More"	2005	3	4		Another Day
"Laugh About It"	2005	16	12		Another Day
"Brother"	2006	14	34		Another Day
"Love You More" (Armin van Buuren Remix)		24	23		The Best of Armin Only
"Close Your Eyes"	2007	26	47		Kicks (soundtrack)
"Lucky All My Life"	2008	19	17		Before You Leave
"Clean Again"	2008	—	65		Before You Leave
"My Town"	2009	—	—		Before You Leave
"No Mercy"	2011	3	3	Platinum	Liverpool Rain
"Don't Give Up the Fight"	2011	20	8		Liverpool Rain
"Took a Hit"	2012	26	57		Liverpool Rain
"Liverpool Rain"	2012	36	56	Platinum	Liverpool Rain
"Freedom"	2012	—	81		Liverpool Rain
"Oceaan"	2012	6	6	Platinum	Alles is familie (soundtrack)
"Shoes of Lighting"	2013	13	5	Gold	All in Good Time
"Brick by Brick"	2014	18	32	Platinum	All in Good Time
"Guilty"	2015	—	—		All in Good Time
"Fun We Had"	2015	—	—		All in Good Time
"Young and Wise"	2016	—	—		All in Good Time
"Bring It On"	2018	—	—		Look Ahead and See the Distance
"Soon"	2018	—	—		Look Ahead and See the Distance
"Het is al laat toch"	2020	2	7	2× Platinum	Spijt is iets voor later
"De echte vent"	2020	12	26	Platinum	Spijt is iets voor later
"Hee joh Jip"	2021	30	37	Gold	Spijt is iets voor later
"Geef je hart niet zomaar weg"	2021	34	59		Spijt is iets voor later
"Tijd verliezen"	2022	—	—		Spijt is iets voor later
"Dans m'n ogen dicht" (with Meau)	2022	37	61		22
"Nickel for Goodbye"	2023	13	31		It Is What It Is
"It's You or Me"	2024	—	—		It Is What It Is
"The Ones We Seek"	2024	—	—		It Is What It Is
