= Another Day (Racoon album) =

Studio album by Racoon
- Released: 9 April 2005
- Genre: Rock
- Label: Play It Again Sam

Racoon chronology
Here We Go, Stereo (2001)	Another Day (2005)	Before You Leave (2007)

Another Day is a third album by the Dutch rock band Racoon. It was first released on 9 April 2005.

== Track listing ==
1. "Happy Family"
2. "Hero's in Town"
3. "Love You More"
4. "Laugh About It"
5. "Blow Your Tears"
6. "Couple of guys"
7. "Got to Get Out"
8. "Brother"
9. "Kingsize"
10. "Lose Another Day"
11. "If You Know What I Mean"
12. "Walk Away"
13. "Hanging with the Clowns"

== Charts ==
=== Weekly charts ===
Chart (2005–06)	Peak position
Dutch Albums (Album Top 100)	2

=== Year-end charts ===
Chart (2005)	Position
Dutch Albums (Album Top 100)	20
Chart (2006)	Position
Dutch Albums (Album Top 100)	15
