= Rich Rich =

Studio album by Ufo361
- Released: 24 April 2020
- Length: 35:08
- Language: German; English
- Label: Stay High
- Producer: Coop The Truth; The Cratez; Gezin of 808 Mafia; Jimmy Torrio; OZ; Sonus030; Tay Keith

Ufo361 chronology
Lights Out (2019)	Rich Rich (2020)	Nur für dich (2020)

Singles from Rich Rich
- 1. "Nur zur Info" Released: 20 December 2019; 2. "Big Drip" Released: 17 January 2020; 3. "Rich Rich" Released: 21 February 2020; 4. "Bad Girls, Good Vibes" Released: 13 March 2020; 5. "Allein sein" Released: 27 March 2020; 6. "Fokus auf die Zukunft" Released: 16 April 2020; 7. "Final Fantasy" Released: 17 April 2020; 8. "Emotions" Released: 27 April 2020

Rich Rich is the sixth studio album by Turkish-German rapper Ufo361 and was released through Stay High on 24 April 2020. The album contains 13 songs. It was produced by Coop The Truth, The Cratez, Gezin of 808 Mafia, Jimmy Torrio, OZ, Sonus030 and Tay Keith.

== Track listing ==
No.	Title	Length
1.	"Eliantte"	2:39
2.	"Rich Rich"	3:24
3.	"Big Drip" (featuring Future)	2:54
4.	"Fokus auf die Zukunft"	1:50
5.	"Final Fantasy"	2:58
6.	"Do Not Disturb"	3:05
7.	"Bad Girls, Good Vibes"	1:47
8.	"Emotions"	2:26
9.	"Allein sein"	2:27
10.	"Kobe Bryant"	2:51
11.	"Rolling Loud"	2:57
12.	"Nur zur Info"	2:22
13.	"Big Drip - Sonus030 Remix" (featuring Future & Sonus030)	3:18
Total length:		35:08

== Charts ==
=== Weekly charts ===
Chart (2020)	Peak position
Austrian Albums (Ö3 Austria)	1
German Albums (Offizielle Top 100)	1
Swiss Albums (Schweizer Hitparade)	2

=== Year-end charts ===
Chart (2020)	Position
Austrian Albums (Ö3 Austria)	42
Swiss Albums (Schweizer Hitparade)	56
