= Büyük Ev Ablukada =

Turkish rock band

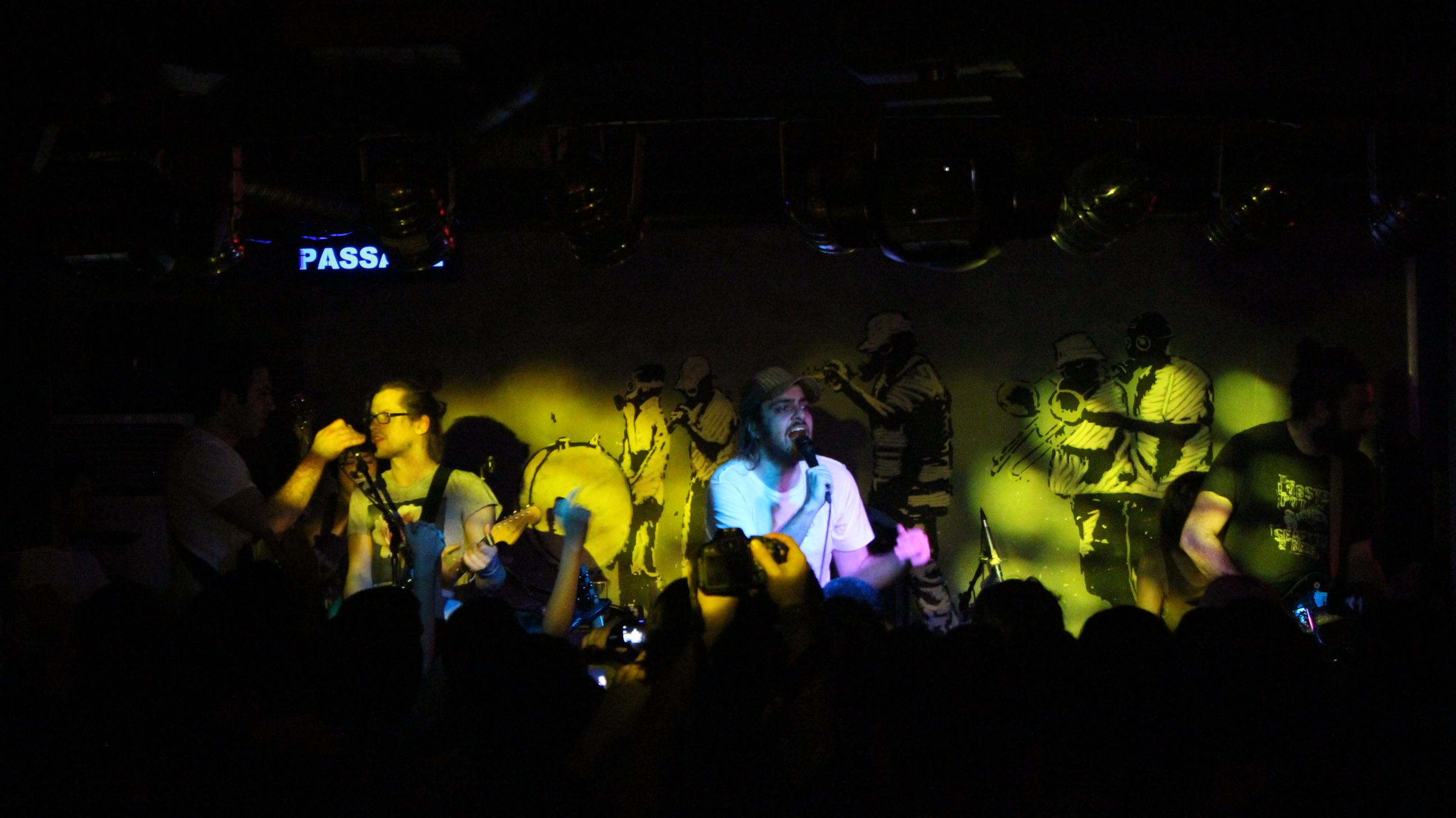
- Büyük Ev Ablukada performing in 2012

Background information
- Origin: Istanbul, Turkey
- Genres: Alternative rock; indie rock; psychedelic rock
- Years active: 2008–present
- Label: Olmadı Kaçarız
- Members: Afordisman Salihins; Bas Bariton; Bentek Sizhepiniz; Canavar Banavar; Galvaniz Gelbiraz; Gelicem Nerdesin
- Website: buyukevablukada.com

Büyük Ev Ablukada (Turkish: [byjyc ev ɑbɫukɑdɑ]) is a Turkish rock band founded in Istanbul in 2008. The band was started by Cem Yılmazer (a.k.a. Afordisman Salihins) and Bartu Küçükçağlayan (a.k.a. Canavar Banavar.) After some time the band turned into an electrical version, which is described by Full Faça. Büyük Ev Ablukada became well-known in a very short time with the help of their own songs and special concerts. The band members use aliases instead of their own names and some of the original names of the members are still unknown. They first released a concert record named "Ay Şuram Ağrıyo" and an album named "Olmadı Kaçarız", and then on 21 December 2012, they released their debut album "Full Faça," which was issued in both CD and vinyl by their own record company, Olmadı Kaçarız.

== Discography ==
Studio albums

- Full Faça (2012)
- Ay Şuram Hâlâ Ağrıyo (2017)
- FIRTINAYT (2017)
- Mutsuz Parti (2020)
- Defansif Dizayn (2023)

== Band members ==
- Afordisman Salihins (Cem Yılmazer) – guitars, keyboards
- Bas Bariton – bass
- Bentek Sizhepiniz – electric guitar
- Omçelik (Onur Ünsal) – keyboards, vocals
- Canavar Banavar (Bartu Küçükçağlayan) – vocals, guitars
- Galvaniz Gelbiraz (Gülin "Gülinler" Kılıçay) – vocals
- Gelicem Nerdesin (Alican Tezer) – drums
