= Ufo361 =

Turkish-German rapper (born 1988)

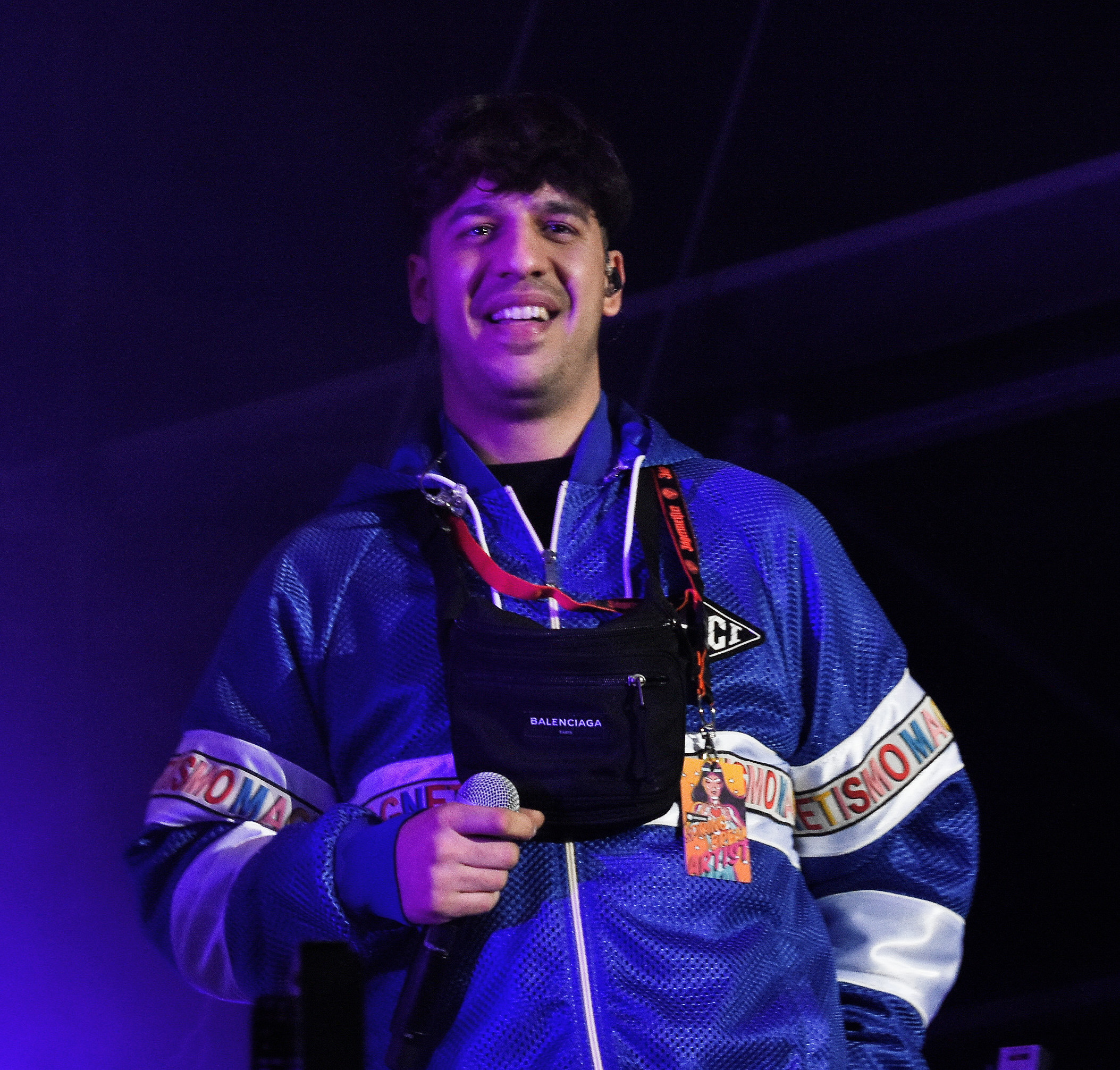
- Ufo361 in 2018

Background information
- Born: Ufuk Bayraktar; 28 May 1988 (age 37); West Berlin, West Germany
- Genres: Hip hop; trap; cloud rap; pop rap
- Occupations: Rapper; songwriter
- Years active: 2010–present
- Label: Stay High

Ufuk Bayraktar (born 28 May 1988), better known by his stage name Ufo361, is a German rapper of Turkish origin from Berlin.

== Early life ==
Bayraktar was born to Turkish parents in West Berlin and raised in Kreuzberg. He became interested in hip hop at a young age and started out as a graffiti sprayer in the THC-Crew. His stage name is derived from his first name, Ufuk, and his hometown Kreuzberg's postal code, 36/61.

== Career ==
In 2010, Bayraktar was signed to Hoodrich, a label founded by his friend Said. On 7 October 2011, their first sampler was released. Together with Said and producer KD-Supier, they formed the trio Bellini Boyz.

In 2012, he released his first EP Bald ist dein Geld meins (engl. Soon your money will be mine). His first studio album, Ihr seid nicht allein (engl. You are not alone), was released in August 2014.

Ufo's first hit was the single "Ich bin ein Berliner", released in September 2015 in support for his first mixtape of the same name. Referring to John F. Kennedy's famous speech Ich bin ein Berliner, the single became a viral hit in Germany and was shared by famous rappers, including the 187 Strassenbande, Haftbefehl and Fler. "Ich bin ein Berliner" was released on 25 March 2016 and peaked at number 57 on the German album-charts.

Less than eight months later, Ufo361 released Ich bin 2 Berliner which peaked on 13 on the German albums chart. His first major success was his third mixtape Ich bin 3 Berliner, released in April 2017, which spawned several singles including "Mister T", "Für die Gang", "Der Pate" and "James Dean".

In April 2017, he founded his own record label, Stay High. In mid-December 2017, he announced his second studio album 808, which was released in April 2018. The album debuted at number one of the German and Austrian albums charts. His third studio album, VVS, was announced in June 2018 and was released on 17 August 2018.

In 2019, Ufo361 signed 15-year-old newcomer Data Luv and released his fourth studio album Wave on 9 August. That saame year, he released a collaborative album titled Lights Out with Ezhel on 14 November.

In 2020, Ufo361 released Rich Rich.. That same year, he released nur fur dich with Sonus030.

In 2021, Ufo361 released STAY HIGH., he then released DESTROY ALL COPIES that same year.

After a two-year hiatus and a handful of singles, Ufo361 released LOVE MY LIFE in 2023.

In 2024, Ufo361 released SONY, NUR FUR DICH 2, and its deluxe.

Then, after a whole year of releasing a handful of singles, but no album in 2025, Ufo361 released BEWARE at the beginning of 2026.

== Discography ==
- Ihr seid nicht allein (2014)
- Ich bin ein Berliner (2016)
- Ich bin 2 Berliner (2016)
- Ich bin 3 Berliner (2017)
- 808 (2018)
- VVS (2018)
- Wave (2019)
- Lights Out (2019)
- Rich Rich (2020)
- Nur für dich (2020)
- Stay High (2021)
- Destroy All Copies (2021)
- Love My Life (2023)
- Sony (2024)
- Nur für dich 2 (2024)
- Beware (2026)

== Stay High label ==
- UFO361
- KOHEI (2024)
