= Lights Out (Ezhel and Ufo361 album) =

Studio album by Ezhel and Ufo361
- Released: 15 November 2019
- Recorded: 2019
- Genre: Trap, hip hop
- Length: 37:39
- Language: Turkish, German
- Label: Stay High
- Producer: Bugy, The Cratez, DJ Artz, Ezhel, Jimmy Torrio & Sonus030

Ezhel chronology
Müptezhel (2017)	Lights Out (2019)	Made in Turkey (2020)

Ufo361 chronology
WAVE (2019)	Lights Out (2019)	Rich Rich (2020)

Singles from Lights Out
- 1. "Wir sind Kral" Released: 11 October 2019; 2. "YKKE" Released: 31 October 2019

Lights Out is a collaboration album by Turkish rapper Ezhel and Turkish-German rapper Ufo361. It was released on 15 November 2019. The album contains 12 songs. It was produced by Bugy, The Cratez, DJ Artz, Ezhel, Jimmy Torrio and Sonus030.

== Track listing ==
No.	Title	Length
1.	"Kapat Işıklarını" ("Turn Off Your Lights")	2:40
2.	"Schwarz & Weiss" ("Black & White")	3:09
3.	"Kendini Kaybet" ("Lose Yourself")	3:35
4.	"Fallen" ("Falling")	3:21
5.	"Lights Out"	3:12
6.	"Yemin Olsun" ("I Swear")	3:14
7.	"Zombie"	3:24
8.	"Bir Daha" ("Once Again")	2:50
9.	"Grind"	2:46
10.	"YKKE"	4:24
11.	"Wir sind Kral" ("We are kings")	2:34
12.	"Preis" ("Price")	2:30
Total length:		37:39

== Charts ==
Chart (2019)	Peak position
Austrian Albums (Ö3 Austria)	23
German Albums (Offizielle Top 100)	42
Swiss Albums (Schweizer Hitparade)	55
