= Lil' Kleine =

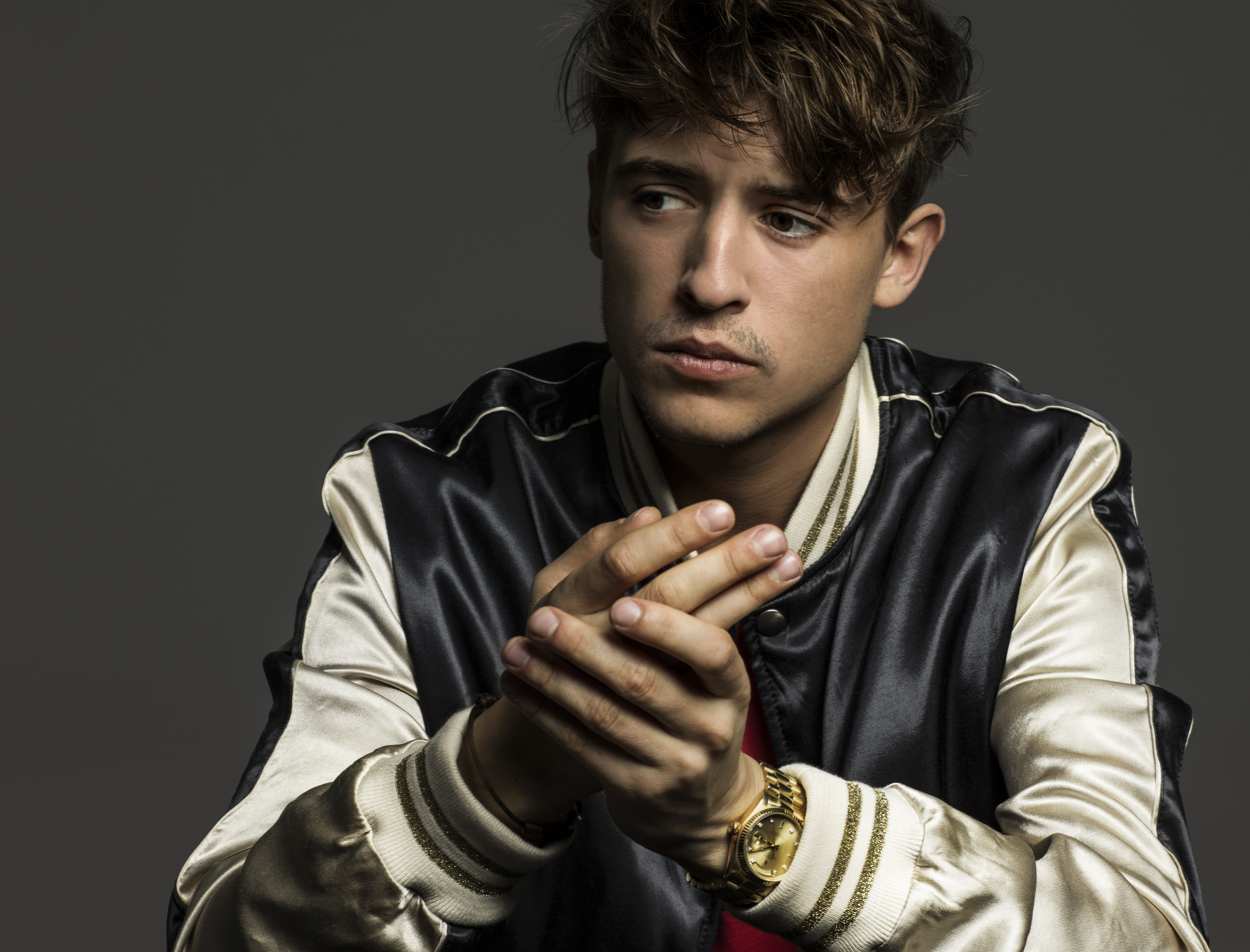
- Lil' Kleine in 2017
- Born: Jorik Scholten; 15 October 1994 (age 31); Amsterdam, Netherlands
- Occupations: Rapper; actor; singer
- Years active: 2005–present
- Partner: Jaimie Vaes (2017–2022)
- Children: 1
- Musical career
- Genre: Nederhop
- Instrument: Vocals
- Label: TopNotch
- Website: lilkleine.nl

Jorik Scholten (Dutch pronunciation: [ˈjɔrɪk ˈsxɔltə(n)]; born 15 October 1994), professionally known as Lil' Kleine (pronounced [lɪl ˈklɛinə]), is a Dutch rapper, actor and singer. He collaborated with fellow rapper Ronnie Flex to produce the number-one single "Drank & Drugs" and the number-one album Wop!.

== Career ==
=== 1994–2013: Early life and career beginnings ===
Scholten was born on 15 October 1994 in the Nieuwmarkt district of Amsterdam, Netherlands. At the age of one, he was diagnosed with leukemia in his back that required surgery. He spent the first seven years of his life in De Wallen, moving to Amsterdam-Oost with his father after his parents divorced.

Scholten was signed with talent agencies at an early age and made his acting debut in the 2005 film Diep. After befriending rapper Lange Frans, Scholten began performing with Lange Frans' band D-Men on-stage. In 2012, Scholten adopted the stage name "Lil' Kleine" and released his first EP: Tuig van de Richel. The following year, the song: Zo Verdomd Alleen, which he recorded with Danny de Munk, reached the Single Top 100.

=== 2013–present: Drank & Drugs, Wop!, Alleen and other endeavours ===
After signing with hip-hop label TopNotch in 2013, Scholten collaborated with fellow rapper Ronnie Flex to produce the single Drank & Drugs, a song about alcohol, drugs and sex, which reached number one on the Single Top 100 and was certified double platinum. Drank & Drugs won the 3FM Award for Best Single in March 2016.

In February 2016, Scholten released his debut album Wop!. In the album’s first week, all eleven of its tracks ranked within the top 35 of the Single Top 100 and the album reached number 1 on the Album Top 100 – it is the first hip hop/rap album in the Netherlands to accomplish these feats. Wop! also became the most-streamed new album on Spotify in Dutch history, being streamed over 1.5 million times during the 24 hours after its release, beating the previous record holder, Justin Bieber's Purpose. Also in its first week, all of the album’s tracks ranked within Spotify's Netherlands Top 50, with singles "Niet Omdat Het Moet" and "1, 2, 3" (both featuring Ronnie Flex) at numbers 1 and 2 respectively. "Niet Omdat Het Moet," received over half a million views on YouTube during its first few days, being the most viewed YouTube video in the Netherlands at the time.

Scholten’s second album, Alleen, was released in May 2017. All eleven of its tracks reached Spotify's Netherlands Top 25, with songs Krantenwijk (featuring Boef) and Alleen at numbers 1 and 2 respectively. Collectively, Scholten’s songs were streamed by 1.84 million listeners on Spotify during the month preceding the album’s release. It was the first time an individual Dutch artist’s music was streamed by that many listeners in a month's time.

Scholten released his third album, Jongen van de Straat, in 2020. His fourth album, Ibiza Stories, released in 2022, is about the love and hate he feels towards his fiancée, and his alleged abuse on their 2021 holiday in Ibiza.

In 2017, Scholten was one of fifteen celebrities who competed on the nineteenth season of Expeditie Robinson. He was the first contestant to leave the competition, having been voted off at his own request after three days. Scholten was a coach on the ninth and tenth seasons of The Voice of Holland.

== Personal life and legal issues ==
Scholten was in a relationship with Monica Geuze which ended in 2016. He began a relationship with Jaimie Vaes in May 2017, and they became engaged in August 2018. Their son was born in 2019. On 23 May 2021, while the couple was holidaying in Ibiza, Scholten was arrested on suspicion of beating Vaes and damaging her mobile phone. The case was dismissed by a Spanish court after Vaes returned to the Netherlands without having appeared in court. The incident made the theme of domestic violence a much discussed subject in the Dutch media that week. On 2 June, the couple published a video on Instagram in which they denied physical violence had taken place. Vaes later expressed regret regarding the release of the video in an interview.

On 11 February 2022, Scholten was sentenced to 120 hours of community service for assaulting a man in a nightclub in 2019. Two days later, he was arrested on suspicion of assaulting Vaes. Initially released from custody after two days, Scholten was re-arrested on 1 March following a successful appeal against his release by the prosecution. He was released on bail on 15 March. In response to the arrest, Madame Tussauds Amsterdam removed Scholten's wax figure from their display, Spotify removed all his music from their editorial playlists, FunX stopped playing his music and Sony Music announced they would no longer be working with him. Interviewed on a talk show in April, Vaes announced that her relationship with Scholten was over, accused him of further incidences of domestic abuse and announced that she was pressing charges against him. In January 2024, Jorik appeared on the TV show Renze to apologize for the domestic abuse he committed.

== Discography ==
Studio albums

- Wop! (2016)
- Alleen (2017)
- Jongen van de straat (2020)
- Ibiza Stories (2022)
