= Drank & Drugs =

Single by Lil' Kleine & Ronnie Flex

from the album New Wave
- Released: 2015
- Genre: Hip house
- Length: 2:25
- Label: TopNotch
- Songwriters: Ronell Plasschaert, Julien Willemsen and Jorik Scholten
- Producer: Jack $hirak

Music video
- "Drank & Drugs" on YouTube

"Drank & Drugs" (English translation: "Drinks & Drugs") is a song by Dutch rappers Lil' Kleine and Ronnie Flex. It was featured on the 2015 album New Wave by the rap collective of the same name under the Dutch hip-hop label TopNotch and subsequently released as a single reaching number one in the Netherlands and number three in Dutch-speaking Belgium. It was featured in the sixth episode of the third series of the BBC Two comedy Motherland.

== Background ==
Record label TopNotch originally did not believe that "Drank & Drugs" was a good fit for the New Wave album, because it sounded more tech house than the rest of the hip-hop on the album. Lil' Kleine wrote the lyrics in the studio with his friends, who he invited. The song became a hit during secondary school exam season in the Netherlands. It was also popular in Belgium, where Lil' Kleine and Ronnie Flex performed the song at the Pukkelpop festival.

The song was also controversial, as it was seen as promoting drug use and alcohol consumption for teenagers, including the lyric "Alle tieners zeggen ja tegen MDMA" (lit. 'All teenagers say yes to MDMA'). Radio DJs were asked to not play the song during hours when children would be listening. Sander Dekker, a Dutch politician who was serving as the State Secretary for Education, Culture and Science, spoke out against the song. The RTL 4 nightly news programme EditieNL brought on a pedagogue to discuss the song. A version without the MDMA reference was released. Primary school students often requested DJs to play the song for them, and some felt uncomfortable.

In response, radio DJ Giel Beelen wrote a children's version of the song, where the titular phrase was replaced with "chips and Coke", and the lyrics encouraged teenagers to say yes to Ranja, a fruit-flavoured syrup and drink.

Ronnie Flex said that "Parents are crazy if their child manages to get MDMA at the age of ten. I think the responsibility lies with them."

== Music video ==
The music video was directed by Sam de Jong and starred British-Dutch actress Olivia Lonsdale. It received four million views on YouTube within the first month. In the video, Lonsdale and others hump several inanimate objects including a lawn, a park bench, a parking sign, a full garbage bag, a tree and a bush. In the American media, GQ wrote an article calling it "arguably the most bizarre thing to come out of the Netherlands...well, this month."

== Charts ==
Chart (2015)	Peak position
Netherlands (Dutch Top 40)	1
Netherlands (Single Top 100)	1
Belgium (Ultratop 50 Flanders)	3

=== German version ===
There is also a German-language version, titled "Stoff und Schnaps". Released in 2016, it reached number 16 in Germany and number 65 in Austria.

Chart (2016)	Peak position
Austria (Ö3 Austria Top 40)	65
Germany (GfK)	16

== Certifications ==
Region	Certification	Certified units/sales
Denmark (IFPI Danmark)	Gold	45,000^{‡}
^{‡} Sales+streaming figures based on certification alone.
