= Ronnie Flex =

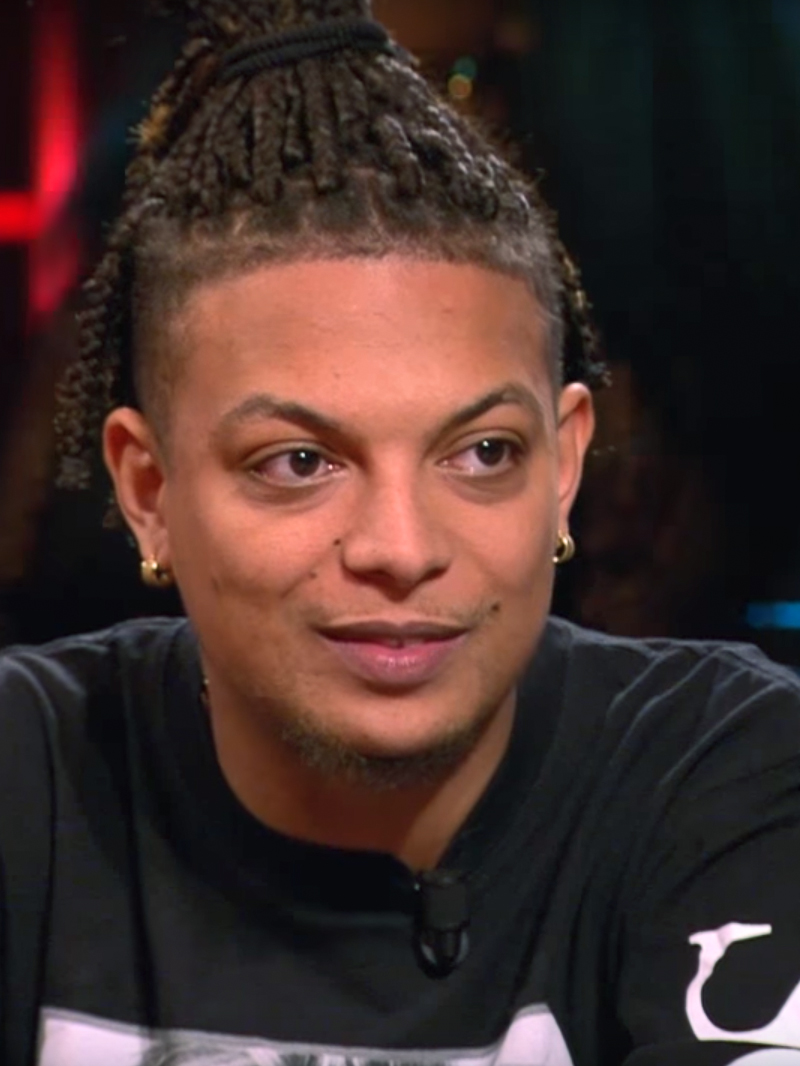
- Ronnie Flex (2017)

Background information
- Born: Ronell Langston Plasschaert; April 16, 1992 (age 34); Capelle aan den IJssel, South Holland, Netherlands
- Genres: Hip hop; Nederhop
- Occupations: Rapper; singer
- Instrument: Vocals
- Years active: 2008–present
- Labels: Nouveau Riche (2007–2010); TopNotch (2011–2021); Trifecta (2017–present)
- Website: ronnieflex.nl

Ronell Langston Plasschaert (born 16 April 1992), known professionally as Ronnie Flex, is a Dutch hip hop performer and rapper of Surinamese descent.

He was named the most successful rapper of all time on the Dutch Top 40 singles chart.

== Career ==
Plasschaert started making music at a young age. Monica Geuze was his DJ for several years. In 2012, he got his first hit in the Netherlands with his song "Soldaatje", which he made with fellow rapper Mr. Polska. On 20 March 2013, Plasschaert released his first solo single, "Tankstation", which reached the 100th place in the Dutch Single Top 100. He released his debut album De nacht is nog jong, net als wij voor altijd on 14 November 2014. Plasschaert then released several singles, including "Drank & Drugs", a song made in collaboration with fellow rapper Lil' Kleine, which achieved first place in the Single Top 100 and remained in the chart for a total of 35 weeks.

Plasschaert took part on the 16th season of the television series Expeditie Robinson in September 2015. Since 2018, he has been a member of the judging panel on the television program It Takes 2. In June of that year, in collaboration with BLØF, Plasschaert released the single "Omarm me". On 12 July, he released a remix of the song "Wine Slow" in collaboration with Idaly, Famke Louise and Bizzey.

In October 2018, Plasschaert launched his own clothing line in collaboration with clothing company CoolCat.

In 2022, he appeared in the television show The Masked Singer.

== Personal life ==
Plasschaert had a relationship with Famke Louise from mid-2018, until early-2019. They announced their relationship in their Christmas song "Alleen door jou". Plasschaert has a daughter with his ex-girlfriend DJ Wef.

== Discography ==
=== Albums ===
Year	Album	NL 100		BE 200	
Year	Album	Peak	Weeks	Peak	Weeks
2014	De nacht is nog jong, net als wij voor altijd	53	3	195	1
2015	New Wave	11	128	92	56
2017	Rémi	1	184	17	67
2018	Nori	1	51	4	27
2021	Altijd samen	2	15	12	4
2024	SDL 0.5	4	1	94	1

=== Singles ===
Year	Title	Peak chart positions	
Year	Title	NLD 40	NL 100
2012	"Soldaatje" (featuring Mr. Polska)	—	84
2012	"Nooit meer slapen" (featuring Yellow Claw, MocroManiac and Jebroer)	38	31
2013	"Tankstation"	—	100
2014	"Zusje"	25	43
2014	"Hoesten Als Bejaarden Nu" (featuring Mr. Polska, Skinto and Jebroer)	—	tip
2014	"Pocahontas"	—	tip
2015	"Ravotten" (featuring Mr. Polska)	tip3	58
2015	"No go zone" (featuring Jandro, Idaly, Lil' Kleine, Bokoesam and Def Major)	—	38
2015	"Kan er niet omheen" (featuring Jonna Fraser, Lijpe and KM)	—	99
2015	"Drank & drugs" (featuring Lil' Kleine)	1	1
2015	"Zeg dat niet" (featuring Lil' Kleine)	—	34
2015	"Nigga als ik" (featuring SFB)	—	58
2015	"Hoog/Laag" (featuring Idaly, Lil' Kleine, Bokoesam and Jonna Fraser)	—	67
2015	"Vallen in de club" (featuring Jandro, Cartiez and Lijpe)	—	93
2015	"Investeren in de liefde" (featuring SFB, Lil' Kleine and Bokoesam)	tip1	22
2015	"Liegen voor de rechter" (featuring Lil' Kleine and Jonna Fraser)	—	tip
2015	"Het is zover" (featuring Jonna Fraser)	—	tip
2015	"Laten gaan" (featuring Monica Geuze, Mafe, Abira, Frenna and Emms)	tip2	52
2015	"Meisjes blijven meisjes" (featuring Two Crooks, Frenna and Emms)	—	62
2015	"Niemand" (featuring Mr. Polska)	3	2
2015	"We zijn hier" (featuring Dio, Jayh and Bokoesam)	—	92
2015	"Ik zag je staan" (featuring Jonna Fraser and Idaly)	—	82
2015	"Nu sta je hier" (featuring SFB and Broederliefde)	16	12
2015	"Wij zijn altijd"	30	18
2016	"Alleen" (featuring Giocatori, Lil' Kleine and Sjaak)	—	53
2016	"1, 2, 3" (featuring Lil' Kleine)	5	3
2016	"Bel me op" (featuring Lil' Kleine)	—	9
2016	"Mist & regen" (featuring Lil' Kleine)	—	16
2016	"Niet omdat het moet" (featuring Lil' Kleine)	3	1
2016	"Stripclub" (featuring Lil' Kleine)	—	15
2016	"Zeg dat niet" (featuring Lil' Kleine)	—	18
2016	"Zonder reden" (featuring Lil' Kleine)	—	21
2016	"Miljonairs" (featuring Broederliefde and Frenna)	—	51
2016	"Narcos" (featuring Broederliefde, SBMG, Jonna Fraser, Hef and RMB)	—	89
2016	"Niet zo" (featuring Murda)	—	55
2016	"Met je zijn" (featuring Glowinthedark, SFB and Philly Moré)	—	55
2016	"Credo santana" (featuring Glowinthedark and SFB)	—	79
2016	"Plek als dit"	29	11
2017	"Energie" (featuring Frenna)	2	1
2017	"Loterij" (featuring Lil' Kleine)	15	2
2017	"Come Again" (featuring Boef)	2	2
2017	"Is dit over" (featuring Tabitha)	tip1	13
2017	"Blijf bij mij" (featuring Maan)	2	1
2017	"4/5"	tip1	2
2018	"NORI"	—	26
2018	"Fan" (featuring Famke Louise)	4	1
2018	"Non Stop"	tip2	1
2018	"Wat is Love"	—	2
2018	"Half 8" (featuring Esko and Idaly)	—	59
2018	"Pull Up" (featuring Dyna and Frenna)	27	3
2018	"Altijd op tijd" (featuring Vic9)	—	13
2018	"Omarm me" (featuring BLØF)	32	5
2018	"Meli meli" (featuring Ali B and Numidia)	tip4	6
2018	"Miljonair" (featuring $hirak, SBMG, Lil' Kleine and Boef)	6	1
2018	"Wine Slow (Remix)" (featuring Idaly, Famke Louise and Bizzey)	tip2	3
2018	"Maria" (featuring Bizzey)	tip3	10
2018	"Kriebels" (featuring Broederliefde)	—	28
2018	"Spectakel" (featuring Boef and Ali B)	—	55
2018	"Alleen door jou" (featuring Famke Louise)	15	3
2018	"Fallin'" (featuring Idaly and SFB)	tip1	15
2019	"Haal me naar boven" (featuring Sarita Lorena)	tip1	22
2019	"Woozy" (featuring Caza)	—	61
2019	"Baller Alert" (featuring Sevn Alias)	—	64
2019	"Heimwee"	—	28
2019	"Givenchy Bag"	—	81
2020	"Zeldzaam" (featuring Tabitha)	tip8	46
2020	"Venus" (featuring Frenna and Snelle)	tip1	9
2020	"Online/Offline" (featuring Qlas & Blacka)	—	72
2020	"Vandaan" (featuring Lil' Kleine)	—	5
2020	"Doorheen" (featuring Bilal Wahib, Bizzey en Ramiks)	—	15
2020	"Anyway" (featuring SFB)	—	42
2020	"In de schuur" (featuring Snelle)	12	10
2020	"Voodoo" (featuring Idaly)	—	98
2021	"501" (featuring Bilal Wahib)	3	1
2021	"Free GG" (featuring Djahboy)	—	96
2021	"Crooswijk Freestyle" (featuring Murda)	—	72
2021	"Standaard Procedure" (featuring Lil' Kleine)	—	15
2021	"Alles wat ik mis" (featuring Emma Heesters & Kris Kross Amsterdam)	7	1
2021	"Alles wat ik wil" (featuring COR, Reverse & Idaly)	—	94
2021	"Goed genoeg" (with Yade Lauren)	tip9	8
2021	"Uhuh" (with $hirak, Yssi SB & Lil' Kleine)	11	2
2021	"Down 4 Life" (with Nour)	—	50
2021	"Meisje zonder naam" (featuring Emma Heesters & Trobi)	tip8	56
2021	"Overbodig" (featuring Tabitha & Glen Faria)	tip19	59
2022	"Wishlist" (with Ashafar and Trobi)	—	40
2022	"Okee Shordy" (featuring Trobi, ADF Samski & Chivv)	tip1	8
2022	"100 SMSjes" (featuring Sigourney K)	24	13
2022	"Als je bij me blijft" (featuring $hirak, Cristian D, Bilal Wahib & Boef)	tip6	2
2022	"Terug bij af" (featuring Flemming)	18	27
2022	"Adrenaline" (with Kris Kross Amsterdam and Zoë Tauran)	6	6
2023	"Love Song" (with Trobi and Bilal Wahib)	28	3
2023	"Baddie" (with $hirak, Cristian D, KM and Emms)	tip8	14
2023	"Al die dagen" (with Boef)	—	50
2023	"Doe me dansje" (with La Fuente and Kraantje Pappie)	tip10	56
2023	"Kameraden voor het leven" (with Hef, ADF Samski, Emms, Kevin, Sjef and Jahma)	—	56
2023	"Sliden" (with Antoon)	28	9
2023	"Bassline" (with Antoon)	—	74
2023	"Domino" (with Katnuf, Jonna Fraser and Caza)	tip1	5
2023	"Wacht op mij" (with Trobi and Tabitha)	tip4	13
2024	"Alles op gevoel" (with Flemming and Zoë Tauran)	4	2
2024	"Desire"	tip17	68
2024	"Gaan we weg?" (with Roxy Dekker)	1	1
2024	"Damage" (Noano featuring Ronnie Flex)	18	1
2024	"Heel de nacht alleen" (with Yade Lauren and Mula B)	—	41
2025	"Zal ik blijven" (with Tabitha, Emms and DJ Dylvn)	—	65
2025	"Suicide" (with Kevin)	—	57
2025	"Concentratie" (with Jonna Fraser)	—	68
2025	"Flemming" (with S10 and Illie)	—	34
2025	"Oneindig" (with KM and Neema Nekesa)	—	78
2025	"Beneden" (with Bizzey and Russo)	—	9
2025	"Boccaccio" (with Lil' Kleine)	—	9
2025	"Nonchalant" (with Russo)	—	44
2026	"CD van mij" (with AEDM)	25	18
2026	"Voor de straten" (with Rolf Sanchez)	—	40
2026	"Punta cana" (with ADF and DJ Dylvn featuring Antje, Trapmoneybiggie and Carel)	—	4
2026	"Al Me Ladies" (with ADF, ADF Samski and Carel featuring Scarface)	—	49
2026	"Smaakt naar water" (with Lil' Kleine)	—	13
2026	"Voodoo" (with Carel)	—	73
2026	"Schijn je licht op mij" (with ADF Samski)	5	1
