= Frenna =

Francis Edusei
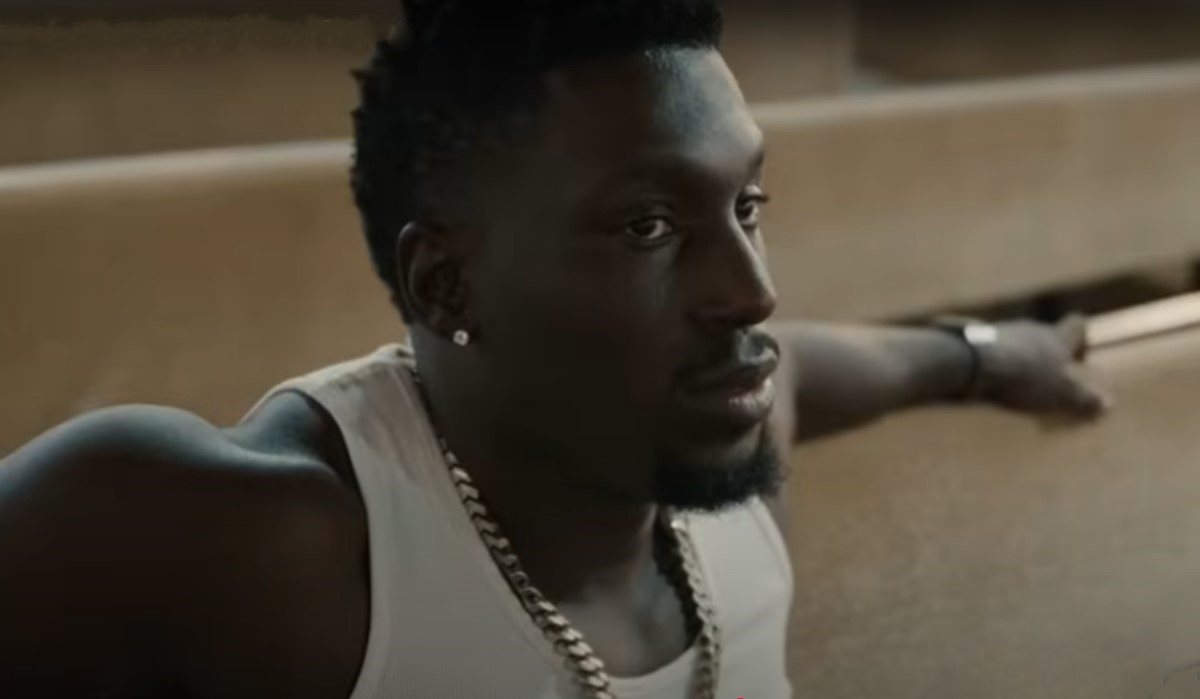
- Frenna (2024)

Background information
- Also known as: Frenna
- Born: Francis Junior Edusei; 17 November 1991 (age 34); Den Haag
- Origin: The Netherlands
- Genres: Dutch hip-hop; pop
- Occupations: Rapper, singer
- Years active: 2014–present
- Label: Top Notch
- Member of: SFB

Francis Edusei (The Hague, 17 November 1991), known professionally as Frenna, is a Dutch rapper and singer. He was a member of the rap group SFB and also currently releases music as a solo artist. He was one of the rappers that was awarded the Popprijs award at Noorderslag thanks to the album New Wave (2015).

== Biography ==
Edusei is of Ghanaian descent and was born and raised in The Hague. Although rap initially started out as a hobby for him, he ended up investing more time into it, leading to the development of his rap group consisting of three friends known as Strictly Family Business, more commonly known as SFB. Oftentimes, at the start of the group's formation, Frenna and the other SFB members would hone their talents by simply creating raps in the car, rapping about whatever came to their mind. Their first recording was based on a song called Zieknieh, which they performed at a birthday party of their friend. The success of this track led to the release of the song Flexen as a debut single. This song ended up becoming a club hit, and it has been viewed well over a million times on YouTube to this date.

Even though Frenna was initially nervous to fully step into the music industry he decided to take it up as a serious profession. Frenna himself often refers to the studio as his second home, as he spends many hours perfecting his craft. With SFB specifically, the lead-in to many of their tracks that they produced came from freestyling. Using this method, Frenna and SFB were able to make their raps sound much more creative and unique in comparison to the monotonous, pre-written lyrics of many of their competitors in the Netherlands at the time. This is also why they consistently develop the chorus' of their songs in the form of a freestyle.

Later on, in 2018, Frenna was able to break the Dutch single-standing Spotify record for gaining the most streams on a song after the first day of release with his single Verleden Tijd. This song was able to keep a grip on the top spot in the Dutch Top 40 charts for 6 consecutive weeks. Towards the end of 2019, Frenna's discography had received over 325 million streams, which at the time officially crowned him the most-streamed Dutch Spotify artist. In this time period, he even surpassed global superstars like The Weeknd and Justin Bieber within the Netherlands.

== Discography highlights ==
In February 2019, received the Edison Pop Award for the first time, rewarding his work on his album Francis. In July 2020, Frenna ended up receiving a reward that recognized his achievement of gaining 1 billion streams across all platforms (this metric did include the streams on songs that he was featured on).

The fifth solo album that he released, Highest, was the first major development that Frenna made towards attracting an increased number of fans internationally. He had already made a small effort to improve his international image, as the album Francis contained a feature from the British artist Yxng Bane. However, Highest, which is a bilingual album, includes features from complete different reaches of the world, including Nigerian artist Yemi Alade, Ghanaian artist King Promise, and another British artist in Young Adz of D-Block Europe.

In 2024, Frenna released his hit song Pretty Girls, which became one of his biggest songs to date, garnering more than 60 million streams and also leading to three different remixes, which includes a hugely popular international version that featured Moroccan artist Dystinct as well as Nigerian rapper Davido. This song led to Frenna receiving the Edison Pop Award yet another time, and it also led to his Buma Award in June 2025.

In the summer of 2024, Frenna released his album Pink Summer, and it quickly rose to the number one rank within the Dutch Top 100 Albums. The album ended up going platinum while also being the most popular Dutch album of the year in terms of streaming.
