= The Voice of Holland season 13 =

Dutch reality singing competition

The Voice of Holland
- Season 13
- Hosted by: Chantal Janzen; Edson da Graça; Martijn Krabbé (voice-over)
- Coaches: Ilse DeLange; Willie Wartaal; Suzan & Freek; Dinand Woesthoff
- Winner: Ruben Hillen
- Winning coach: Suzan & Freek
- Runners-up: Sanne van Assouw; Thijs Veldhuis; Nieloefaar Bahadori

Release
- Original network: RTL 4
- Original release: 16 January – 8 May 2026

Season chronology
- ← Previous; Season 12

The thirteenth season of the Dutch reality singing competition The Voice of Holland premiered on 16 January 2026 on RTL 4. This marks the first season since the show's suspension four years prior due to power abuse and misconduct by crew members of the show.

Chantal Janzen returned as host for her fourth consecutive season alongside debutant Edson da Graça (replacing the terminally ill Martijn Krabbé, who still serves as voice-over host). Ilse DeLange returned for her third season as coach after an eight-season hiatus and was joined by debutants Willie Wartaal, Suzan & Freek, and Dinand Woesthoff, marking the first time in the history of the show with an entirely different panel than the previous season.

On 8 May 2026, Ruben Hillen was announced as the winner of the season, marking Suzan & Freek's first win as a coach. Hillen became the first one-chair turn artist to win in the show's history (as well as the first to win and not receive a four-chair turn). Additionally, Suzan & Freek became the fourth coach in the show's history to win their debut season following Marco Borsato, Trijntje Oosterhuis, and Waylon. They also became the first duo coach on the main version of the show to win a season.

== Coaches ==
Coaches of The Voice of Holland Season 13

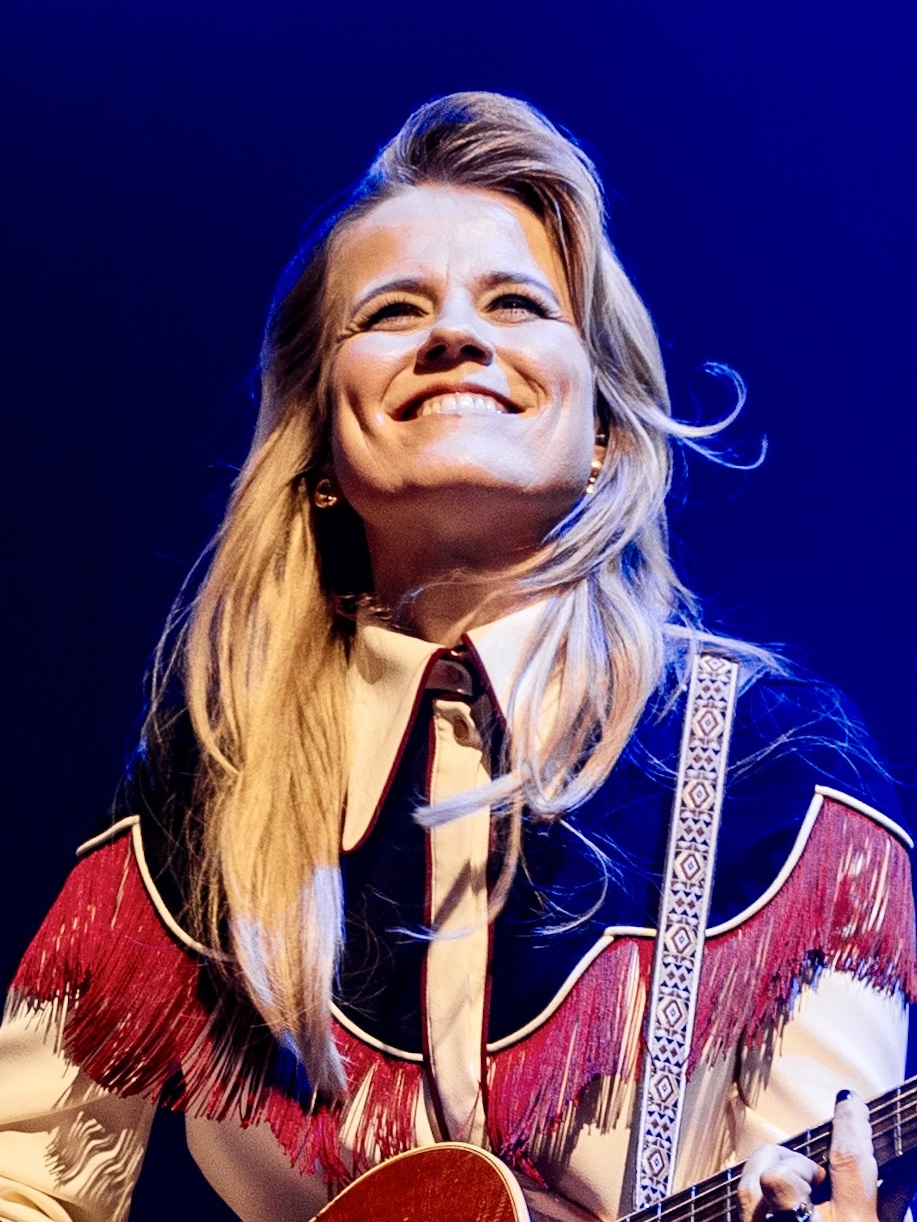
Ilse DeLange

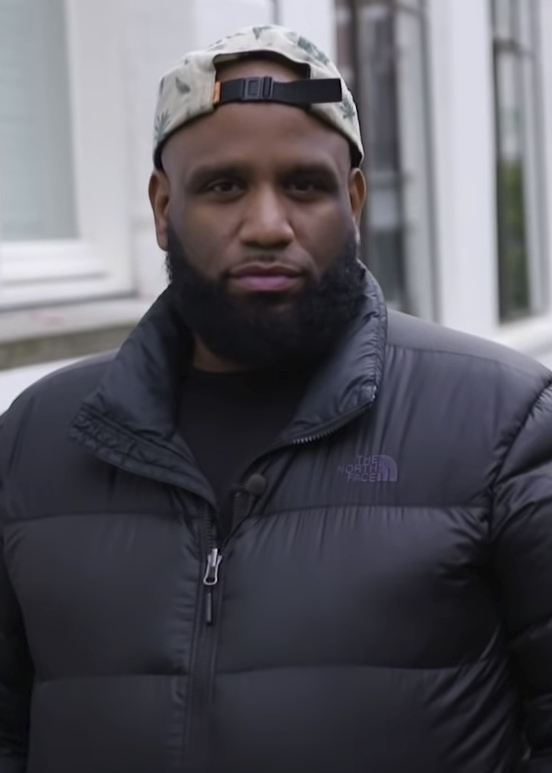
Willie Wartaal

Suzan & Freek

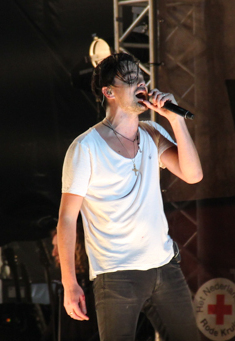
Dinand Woesthoff

On 31 March 2025, it was announced that former coach Ilse DeLange, who last coached in the fifth season, would return for her third season as a coach. Willie Wartaal, Suzan & Freek, and Dinand Woesthoff all were announced to debut as coaches this season. Therefore, this season marks the first in the history of the show in which the entire panel from the previous season; Ali B, Anouk, Glennis Grace, and Waylon did not return. This is also the first time a duo coach is present on the panel since the third season.

On 27 May 2025, Suzan & Freek withdrew from the panel following Freek's diagnosis with lung cancer; however, they rejoined the panel on 4 July 2025 with an announcement that Freek's health was on a more positive trajectory.

== Teams ==
Teams color key
Winner	Eliminated in the Knockouts
Runner-up	Stolen in the Battles
Eliminated in the Semifinals	Eliminated in the Battles

Coaches	Top 49 Artists				
Ilse DeLange					
Ilse DeLange	Sanne van Assouw	Humphrey Nicolas Bacilio	Danitsia Sahadewsing	Britt van Coezand	Myrthe Hendrix
Ilse DeLange	Teddy Macrander	Tess Reurink	~~Nanice Michiels~~	Kelly Hensen	Steffany Markovits
Ilse DeLange	Nicole Richardson	Len Volkers	Sam Zwierink		
Willie Wartaal					
Willie Wartaal	Nieloefaar Bahadori	Hailey Keller	Soufiane Soussan	Dina Ben Azouz	Melissa Dadgarporian
Willie Wartaal	Romy IJzendoorn	Rafael Kaffa	Piene Buur	Mathijs Birahij	Dyde
Willie Wartaal	Mees de Heus	Ritchie Lahnstein	Evi Schuts		
Suzan & Freek					
Suzan & Freek	Ruben Hillen	Nicole Laurore	Riley Ramos de Almeida	Aldert Jan Hoek	Tristan Luijting
Suzan & Freek	Kimiya van Wijk	Daan Wolfs	~~Tess Reurink~~	Jelle de Boon	Vanessa Issa
Suzan & Freek	Sanne-Maaike Oudshoorn	Shelley	Mitchell Verwey	Cleo Vlogman	
Dinand Woesthoff					
Dinand Woesthoff	Thijs Veldhuis	Daan Appelman	Nanice Michiels	Charlene Bakker	Nathalie Blue
Dinand Woesthoff	Zulu Green	Mandy McCandy	~~Romy IJzendoorn~~	~~Daan Wolfs~~	Lynn Heemsbergen
Dinand Woesthoff	Jaimy van Kempen	Deborah Kooning	Yosina Roemajauw		
Note: Italicized names are stolen contestants (name struckthrough within former teams).

== Blind Auditions ==
The blind auditions premiered on 16 January 2026. In this round, an artist performs a song on the stage while the four coaches are turned away from him/her. If the coach wants to work with the artist, they press their "I WANT YOU" button which turns their chair to face the artist. If more than one coach turns for the artist, it is up to the artist to choose his/her coach, effectively joining that team.

The block button, introduced in the previous season, was removed this season.

Color key

✔	Coach pressed "I WANT YOU" button
	Artist defaulted to a coach's team
	Artist elected a coach's team
	Artist was eliminated

=== Episode 1 (16 January) ===
Order	Artist	Song	Coaches' and contestants' choices			
Order	Artist	Song	Ilse	Willie	Suzan & Freek	Dinand
1	Sanne van Assouw	"Voilà"	✔	✔	✔	✔
2	Janey Descendre	"I Got You (I Feel Good)"	—	—	—	—
3	Daan Appelman	"Weak"	✔	—	—	✔
4	Melissa Dadgarporian	"I Surrender"	—	✔	—	✔
5	Ruben Hillen	"Patience"	—	—	✔	—
6	Humphrey Nicolas Bacilio	"I Got a Woman"	✔	✔	✔	—
7	Jaimy van Kempen	"Nu Jij Hier Niet Meer Bent"	—	—	✔	✔
8	Frida Hazel	"Don't Go Yet"	—	—	—	—
9	Zulu Green	"Anxiety"	✔	✔	✔	✔

=== Episode 2 (23 January) ===
Order	Artist	Song	Coaches' and contestants' choices			
Order	Artist	Song	Ilse	Willie	Suzan & Freek	Dinand
1	Hailey Keller	"Bring It On Home to Me"	—	✔	—	✔
2	Jeffrey Beerda	"Radar Love"	—	—	—	—
3	Shelley	"Lose Control"	—	—	✔	✔
4	Tess Reurink	"Beggin'"	—	—	✔	—
5	Angelina-Jane Biesenbeek	"Manchild"	—	—	—	—
6	Thijs Veldhuis	"Another Love"	✔	✔	✔	✔
7	Charlene Bakker	"Hurt"	—	—	—	✔
8	Kevin Paré	"Beauty & de brains"	—	—	—	—
9	Soufiane Soussan	"De Leven"	✔	✔	✔	—

=== Episode 3 (30 January) ===
Order	Artist	Song	Coaches' and contestants' choices			
Order	Artist	Song	Ilse	Willie	Suzan & Freek	Dinand
1	Sam Zwierink	"Soldier On"	✔	✔	—	✔
2	Nieloefaar Bahadori	"Sorry"	✔	✔	✔	—
3	Brecht Klunder	"Seven Nation Army"	—	—	—	—
4	Romy IJzendoorn	"Messy"	—	✔	—	✔
5	Charlie de Groot	"Toxic"	—	—	—	—
6	Myrthe Hendrix	"Homesick"	✔	✔	—	✔
7	Bernadette Pires	"I'd Rather Go Blind" / "Doo Wop (That Thing)"	—	—	—	—
8	Aldert Jan Hoek	"Jump"	—	—	✔	—
9	Britt van Coezand	"Rainbow in the Sky"	✔	—	—	✔

=== Episode 4 (6 February) ===
Order	Artist	Song	Coaches' and contestants' choices			
Order	Artist	Song	Ilse	Willie	Suzan & Freek	Dinand
1	Dina Ben Azouz	"Earth Song"	—	✔	✔	—
2	Culmore Bell	"Forget You"	—	—	—	—
3	Nicole Richardson	"Tyrone"	✔	✔	✔	—
4	Evi Schuts	"Nobody's Wife"	—	✔	✔	✔
5	Mitchell Verwey	"This Is How We Do It"	—	—	✔	✔
6	Rafael Kaffa	"Trouble"	✔	✔	✔	✔
7	Laurie Krukkert	"Jolene"	—	—	—	—
8	Brian Vliem	"Echte Liefde Is Te Koop"	—	—	—	—
9	Deborah Kooning	"Highway to Hell"	✔	—	—	✔

=== Episode 5 (13 February) ===
Order	Artist	Song	Coaches' and contestants' choices			
Order	Artist	Song	Ilse	Willie	Suzan & Freek	Dinand
1	Danitsia Sahadewsing	"Old and Grey"	✔	✔	—	—
2	Cleo Vlogman	"Therapie"	✔	✔	✔	✔
3	Sanne-Maaike Oudshoorn	"Before He Cheats"	—	—	✔	—
4	Mandy McCandy	"When We Were Young"	—	✔	—	✔
5	Timothy Rodriguez Navarro	"September"	—	—	—	—
6	Dyde	"Forget Me"	—	✔	—	—
7	Surange Weerasinghe	"Love Never Felt So Good"	—	—	—	—
8	Thomas Ter Brug	"Don't You Worry 'bout a Thing"	—	—	—	—
9	Nicole Laurore	"I'm Tired"	✔	✔	✔	✔

=== Episode 6 (20 February) ===
Order	Artist	Song	Coaches' and contestants' choices			
Order	Artist	Song	Ilse	Willie	Suzan & Freek	Dinand
1	Steffany Markovits	"Atemlos durch die Nacht"	✔	—	✔	—
2	Ritchie Lahnstein	"Higher Love"	—	✔	—	—
3	Bart de Waal	"Little Lion Man"	—	—	—	—
4	Kelly Hensen	"Gipsy Kings Medley"	✔	—	—	—
5	Thirza van der Kolk	"You Say"	—	—	—	—
6	Piene Buur	"Monsters"	✔	✔	—	—
7	Mees de Heus	"You Raise Me Up"	—	✔	—	—
8	Harvey Muzo	"María"	—	—	—	—
9	Tristan Luijting	"Love Yourself"	✔	✔	✔	✔

=== Episode 7 (27 February) ===
Order	Artist	Song	Coaches' and contestants' choices			
Order	Artist	Song	Ilse	Willie	Suzan & Freek	Dinand
1	Nathalie Blue	"Byłam Różą"	—	—	—	✔
2	Nancy Nahhas	"Yes, And?"	—	—	—	—
3	Daan Wolfs	"You're Still the One"	—	—	—	✔
4	Riley Ramos de Almeida	"Alles Wordt Beter"	✔	✔	✔	✔
5	Marcel Klingeler	"Malle Babbe"	—	—	—	—
6	Teddy Macrander	"Crazy"	✔	✔	—	✔
7	Len Volkers	"Onderweg"	✔	—	—	✔
8	Isis de Neeve	"No Time to Die"	—	—	—	—
9	Lynn Heemsbergen	"Wicked Game"	✔	—	✔	✔

=== Episode 8 (6 March) ===
Order	Artist	Song	Coaches' and contestants' choices			
Order	Artist	Song	Ilse	Willie	Suzan & Freek	Dinand
1	Nanice Michiels	"Skinny Love"	✔	—	✔	✔
2	Mathijs Birahij	"Ordinary"	—	✔	—	—
3	Nouk Vermeer	"Love Myself"	—	—	—	—
4	Kimiya van Wijk	"Vampire"	✔	✔	✔	✔
5	Cas Hendrikx	"7 Years"	—	—	—	—
6	Yosina Roemajauw	"Hou Vol Hou Vast"	✔	—	—	✔
7	Stefan Sprakel	"Castle on the Hill"	—	—	—	—
8	Vanessa Issa	"Bohemian Rhapsody"	—	—	✔	—
9	Jelle de Boon	"Love in the Dark"	✔	✔	✔	✔

== Battles ==
The battles premiered on 13 March 2026. In this round, the coaches pair six duos (one trio for Suzan & Freek) to sing together on their respective teams. Following the performance, the artists' coach picks one winner of the two artists to advance to the knockouts. Each coach has one "steal" in the round which is used on a losing artist in the pairing, effectively bringing that artist to their team. If multiple coaches steal the artist, the artist picks their new team to continue on to the knockouts.

Color key:

Artist won the Battle and advanced to the Knockout Rounds
Artist lost the Battle but was stolen by another coach and advanced to the Knockout Rounds
Artist lost the Battle and was eliminated

Episode	Coach	Order	Winner	Song	Loser	'Steal' result			
Episode	Coach	Order	Winner	Song	Loser	Ilse	Willie	Suzan & Freek	Dinand
Episode 9 (13 March)	Suzan & Freek	1	Kimiya van Wijk	"she's all i wanna be"	Cleo Vlogman	—	—	—N/a	—
Episode 9 (13 March)	Ilse DeLange	2	Humphrey Nicolas Bacilio	"It's a Man's Man's Man's World"	Nicole Richardson	—N/a	—	—	—
Episode 9 (13 March)	Dinand Woesthoff	3	Nathalie Blue	"Zeg me dat het niet zo is"	Jaimy van Kempen	—	—	—	—N/a
Episode 9 (13 March)	Willie Wartaal	4	Rafael Kaffa	"The Door"	Mathijs Birahij	—	—N/a	—	—
Episode 9 (13 March)	Ilse DeLange	5	Danitsia Sahadewsing	"Juice"	Kelly Hensen	—N/a	—	—	—
Episode 9 (13 March)	Suzan & Freek	6	Riley Ramos de Almeida	"The Climb"	Tess Reurink	✔	—	—N/a	—
Episode 10 (20 March)	Willie Wartaal	1	Soufiane Soussan	"lovely"	Piene Buur	Team full	—N/a	—	—
Episode 10 (20 March)	Dinand Woesthoff	2	Zulu Green	"Doo Wop (That Thing)"	Romy IJzendoorn	Team full	✔	—	—N/a
Episode 10 (20 March)	Suzan & Freek	3	Tristan Luijting	"Until I Found You"	Mitchell Verwey	Team full	Team full	—N/a	—
Episode 10 (20 March)	Ilse DeLange	4	Sanne van Assouw	"All I Want"	Nanice Michiels	Team full	Team full	✔	✔
Episode 10 (20 March)	Dinand Woesthoff	5	Mandy McCandy	"Video Games"	Lynn Heemsbergen	Team full	Team full	—	Team full
Episode 10 (20 March)	Willie Wartaal	6	Melissa Dadgarporian	"Don't Speak"	Ritchie Lahnstein	Team full	Team full	—	Team full
Episode 11 (27 March)	Ilse DeLange	1	Britt van Coezand	"Wat Wil Je Van Mij"	Sam Zwierink	Team full	Team full	—	Team full
Episode 11 (27 March)	Suzan & Freek	2	Nicole Laurore	"Runnin' (Lose It All)"	Vanessa Issa	Team full	Team full	—N/a	Team full
Episode 11 (27 March)	Willie Wartaal	3	Nieloefaar Bahadori	"Ik Hou Van Mij"	Dyde	Team full	Team full	—	Team full
Episode 11 (27 March)	Dinand Woesthoff	4	Charlene Bakker	"Dancing with Our Hands Tied"	Yosina Roemajauw	Team full	Team full	—	Team full
Episode 11 (27 March)	Ilse DeLange	5	Teddy Macrander	"Dat Heb Jij Gedaan"	Steffany Markovits	Team full	Team full	—	Team full
Episode 11 (27 March)	Suzan & Freek	6	Aldert Jan Hoek	"The Winner Takes It All"	Shelley	Team full	Team full	—N/a	Team full
Episode 11 (27 March)	Suzan & Freek	6	Aldert Jan Hoek	"The Winner Takes It All"	Jelle de Boon	Team full	Team full	—N/a	Team full
Episode 12 (3 April)	Dinand Woesthoff	1	Thijs Veldhuis	"Somewhere Only We Know"	Daan Wolfs	Team full	Team full	✔	Team full
Episode 12 (3 April)	Willie Wartaal	2	Dina Ben Azouz	"Unchained Melody"	Mees de Heus	Team full	Team full	Team full	Team full
Episode 12 (3 April)	Suzan & Freek	3	Ruben Hillen	"I Do"	Sanne-Maaike Oudshoorn	Team full	Team full	Team full	Team full
Episode 12 (3 April)	Dinand Woesthoff	4	Daan Appelman	"Livin' on a Prayer"	Deborah Kooning	Team full	Team full	Team full	Team full
Episode 12 (3 April)	Ilse DeLange	5	Myrthe Hendrix	"Young and Beautiful"	Len Volkers	Team full	Team full	Team full	Team full
Episode 12 (3 April)	Willie Wartaal	6	Hailey Keller	"Free Your Mind"	Evi Schuts	Team full	Team full	Team full	Team full

== Knockouts ==
The knockouts premiered on 10 April 2026. In this round, the remaining seven artists on each team sing for a spot in the semi-finals. After each performance, the artists' can opt to advance or eliminate the artist directly; the hot-seat system is in effect which allows the coach to seat the artist where they can either remain in the seat and advance to the live shows or be swapped with another artist. Following the performances, only three artists per team to advance to the semi-finals.

Teams Dinand and Suzan & Freek performed on the first night and Teams Ilse and Willie performed on the second night.

Knockouts color key
Artist advanced to the semi-finals
Artist was eliminated, either directly or at the end of the round

Episode	Coach	Order			
Episode	Coach	Order	Artist	Song	Result
Episode 13 (10 April)	Dinand Woesthoff	1	Zulu Green	"Work"	Eliminated
Episode 13 (10 April)	Dinand Woesthoff	2	Charlene Bakker	"Hopelessly Devoted to You"	Eliminated
Episode 13 (10 April)	Dinand Woesthoff	3	Mandy McCandy	"This Is My Life"	Eliminated
Episode 13 (10 April)	Dinand Woesthoff	4	Thijs Veldhuis	"Fake Plastic Trees"	Advanced
Episode 13 (10 April)	Dinand Woesthoff	5	Nathalie Blue	"Friends"	Eliminated
Episode 13 (10 April)	Dinand Woesthoff	6	Nanice Michiels	"She Used to Be Mine"	Advanced
Episode 13 (10 April)	Dinand Woesthoff	7	Daan Appelman	"Society"	Advanced
Episode 13 (10 April)	Suzan & Freek	8	Aldert Jan Hoek	"Impossible"	Eliminated
Episode 13 (10 April)	Suzan & Freek	9	Kimiya van Wijk	"One Last Time"	Eliminated
Episode 13 (10 April)	Suzan & Freek	10	Nicole Laurore	"Bigger Than the Whole Sky"	Advanced
Episode 13 (10 April)	Suzan & Freek	11	Tristan Luijting	"I Won't Give Up"	Eliminated
Episode 13 (10 April)	Suzan & Freek	12	Daan Wolfs	"Tennessee Whiskey"	Eliminated
Episode 13 (10 April)	Suzan & Freek	13	Ruben Hillen	"Beautiful Things"	Advanced
Episode 13 (10 April)	Suzan & Freek	14	Riley Ramos de Almeida	"Dat Is Het Leven"	Advanced
Episode 14 (17 April)	Ilse DeLange	1	Britt van Coezand	"Ik Zing"	Eliminated
Episode 14 (17 April)	Ilse DeLange	2	Humphrey Nicolas Bacilio	"She's a Lady"	Advanced
Episode 14 (17 April)	Ilse DeLange	3	Teddy Macrander	"Grow as We Go"	Eliminated
Episode 14 (17 April)	Ilse DeLange	4	Tess Reurink	"Austin"	Eliminated
Episode 14 (17 April)	Ilse DeLange	5	Sanne van Assouw	"Take Me to Church"	Advanced
Episode 14 (17 April)	Ilse DeLange	6	Danitsia Sahadewsing	"No More Drama"	Advanced
Episode 14 (17 April)	Ilse DeLange	7	Myrthe Hendrix	"Dive"	Eliminated
Episode 14 (17 April)	Willie Wartaal	8	Nieloefaar Bahadori	"Adem Je In"	Advanced
Episode 14 (17 April)	Willie Wartaal	9	Melissa Dadgarporian	"Beautiful People"	Eliminated
Episode 14 (17 April)	Willie Wartaal	10	Romy IJzendoorn	"Ik Was Toch Je Meisje"	Eliminated
Episode 14 (17 April)	Willie Wartaal	11	Rafael Kaffa	"A Change Is Gonna Come"	Eliminated
Episode 14 (17 April)	Willie Wartaal	12	Soufiane Soussan	"Is Dit Nou Later"	Advanced
Episode 14 (17 April)	Willie Wartaal	13	Dina Ben Azouz	"Crazy"	Eliminated
Episode 14 (17 April)	Willie Wartaal	14	Hailey Keller	"Wolken"	Advanced

== Semi-finals ==
The semi-finals aired on 24 April and 1 May. In this round, the remaining three artists perform for one spot per team in the final. For the first time in the show's history, due to the semi-finals being pre-recorded, the coaches choose their finalists with no public vote.

Teams Dinand and Willie performed on the first night and Teams Ilse and Suzan & Freek performed on the second night.

Semi-finals color key
Artist was chosen by their coach and advanced to the finale
Artist was eliminated

Episode	Coach	Order			
Episode	Coach	Order	Artist	Song	Result
Episode 15 (24 April)	Dinand Woesthoff	1	Nanice Michiels	"Buut Vrij"	Eliminated
Episode 15 (24 April)	Dinand Woesthoff	2	Daan Appelman	"Drops of Jupiter (Tell Me)"	Eliminated
Episode 15 (24 April)	Dinand Woesthoff	3	Thijs Veldhuis	"Going to a Town"	Dinand's choice
Episode 15 (24 April)	Willie Wartaal	4	Soufiane Soussan	"Zo Stil"	Eliminated
Episode 15 (24 April)	Willie Wartaal	5	Hailey Keller	"You Don't Know My Name"	Eliminated
Episode 15 (24 April)	Willie Wartaal	6	Nieloefaar Bahadori	"Werd De Tijd Maar Teruggedraaid"	Willie's choice
Episode 16 (1 May)	Ilse DeLange	1	Humphrey Nicolas Bacilio	"A Song for You"	Eliminated
Episode 16 (1 May)	Ilse DeLange	2	Danitsia Sahadewsing	"Let's Hear It for the Boy"	Eliminated
Episode 16 (1 May)	Ilse DeLange	3	Sanne van Assouw	"Stay"	Ilse's choice
Episode 16 (1 May)	Suzan & Freek	4	Nicole Laurore	"Oscar Winning Tears"	Eliminated
Episode 16 (1 May)	Suzan & Freek	5	Ruben Hillen	"Born with a Broken Heart"	Suzan & Freek's choice
Episode 16 (1 May)	Suzan & Freek	6	Riley Ramos de Almeida	"Avond"	Eliminated

Non-competition performances
Order	Performers	Song
15.1	Snelle, Team Dinand & Team Willie	"In de Schuur"
15.2	Team Dinand	"Fascination"
15.3	Team Willie	"Break My Soul"
16.1	Pommelien Thijs, Team Ilse and Team Suzan & Freek	"Atlas"
16.2	Team Ilse	"Move On Up"
16.3	Team Suzan & Freek	"Someone You Loved"

== Finals ==
The finals aired on 8 May. Each finalist performs one solo song and one duet with their coach. This round is again pre-recorded for the four finalists' performances, while public voting was possible until halfway through that evening's live broadcast of RTL Tonight, where the winner was revealed.

Finals color key
Winner
Runner-up

Finals results
Coach	Artist	Order	Solo song	Order	Duet (with coach)	Result
Willie Wartaal	Nieloefaar Bahadori	1	"A Moment Like This"	5	"American Boy"	Runner-up
Ilse DeLange	Sanne van Assouw	6	"Strong"	2	"Knockin' on Heaven's Door"	Runner-up
Dinand Woesthoff	Thijs Veldhuis	7	"All These Things That I've Done"	3	"Under Pressure"	Runner-up
Suzan & Freek	Ruben Hillen	4	"Sign of the Times"	8	"You Are the Reason"	Winner

Non-competition performances
Order	Performers	Song
17.1	The Top 4 Finalists	"Fix You"
17.2	The Top 4 Finalists	"Golden"

== Elimination chart ==
Results color key
Winner	Saved by coach
Runner-up	Eliminated

Coaches color key
Team Ilse
Team Willie
Team Suzan & Freek
Team Dinand

=== Overall ===
Elimination chart for The Voice of Holland season 13
Artists	Semi-finals	Finale
Ruben Hillen	Safe	Winner
Sanne van Assouw	Safe	Runners-up
Nieloefaar Bahadori	Safe	Runners-up
Thijs Veldhuis	Safe	Runners-up
Daan Appelman	Eliminated	Eliminated (Semi-finals)
Humphrey Nicolas Bacilio	Eliminated	Eliminated (Semi-finals)
Hailey Keller	Eliminated	Eliminated (Semi-finals)
Nicole Laurore	Eliminated	Eliminated (Semi-finals)
Nanice Michiels	Eliminated	Eliminated (Semi-finals)
Riley Ramos de Almeida	Eliminated	Eliminated (Semi-finals)
Danitsia Sahadewsing	Eliminated	Eliminated (Semi-finals)
Soufiane Soussan	Eliminated	Eliminated (Semi-finals)

=== Per team ===
Elimination chart for The Voice of Holland season 13 per team
Artists	Semi-finals	Finale
Sanne van Assouw	Safe	Runner-up
Humphrey Nicolas Bacilio	Eliminated	
Danitsia Sahadewsing	Eliminated	
Nieloefaar Bahadori	Safe	Runner-up
Hailey Keller	Eliminated	
Soufiane Soussan	Eliminated	
Ruben Hillen	Safe	Winner
Nicole Laurore	Eliminated	
Riley Ramos de Almeida	Eliminated	
Thijs Veldhuis	Safe	Runner-up
Daan Appelman	Eliminated	
Nanice Michiels	Eliminated	

== Ratings ==
Episode	Airdate	Total	Total with late watching	Place
The Blind Auditions 1	16 January 2026	1.867.000	2.432.000	1
The Blind Auditions 2	23 January 2026	1.576.000	2.229.000	1
The Blind Auditions 3	30 January 2026	1.625.000	2.244.000	1
The Blind Auditions 4	6 February 2026	1.205.000	1.861.000	2
The Blind Auditions 5	13 February 2026	1.390.000	1.924.000	3
The Blind Auditions 6	20 February 2026	1.087.000		9
The Blind Auditions 7	27 February 2026			
The Blind Auditions 8	6 March 2026		1.698.000	1
The Battles 1	13 March 2026	1.320.000	1.765.000	1
The Battles 2	20 March 2026			
The Battles 3	27 March 2026			
The Battles 4	3 April 2026			
The Knockouts 1	10 April 2026			
The Knockouts 2	17 April 2026			
Semi-finals 1	24 April 2026			
Semi-finals 2	1 May 2026			
Finals	8 May 2026			
