= The Voice of Holland =

Dutch reality television competition

- Genre: Reality competition
- Created by: John de Mol Jr.; Roel van Velzen
- Developed by: Talpa Network
- Directed by: Martijn Nieman; Jeroen van Zalk; Sander Vahle
- Presented by: Martijn Krabbé (2010–2022, 2026: voice only); Wendy van Dijk (2010–2019); Chantal Janzen (2019–present); Edson da Graça (2026−); Backstage: Winston Gerschtanowitz (2010–2013); Jamai Loman (2014–2019, 2022); Geraldine Kemper (2020–2021)
- Starring: The Voice of Holland Band with Jeroen Rietbergen (2013–2022)
- Judges: Roel van Velzen; Jeroen van der Boom; Angela Groothuizen; Nick & Simon; Marco Borsato; Trijntje Oosterhuis; Ali B; Ilse DeLange; Sanne Hans; Anouk; Guus Meeuwis; Waylon; Lil' Kleine; Jan Smit; Glennis Grace; Willie Wartaal; Suzan & Freek; Dinand Woesthoff
- Voices of: Martijn Krabbé
- Country of origin: Netherlands
- Original language: Dutch
- No. of seasons: 13
- No. of episodes: 138

Production
- Running time: 75–90 minutes
- Production companies: Talpa Media (2010–2019); ITV Studios (2019–)

Original release
- Network: RTL 4
- Release: 17 September 2010 – 14 January 2022
- Release: 16 January 2026 – present

Related
- The Voice Kids; The Voice Senior

The Voice of Holland, also known by its acronym TVOH, is a Dutch singing reality competition television series that became a global TV format franchise, created by media tycoon John de Mol Jr. and musician Roel van Velzen in the Netherlands and airs on RTL 4. For the first nine seasons, The Voice of Holland was hosted by Martijn Krabbé and Wendy van Dijk. Starting from the tenth season (2019–2020), Wendy van Dijk was replaced by Chantal Janzen. The twelfth season concluded prematurely in 2022 due to sexual misconduct allegations relating to crew members, and the series was subsequently put on hiatus. The season returned with a thirteenth season in January 2026. Starting from this thirteenth season, Edson da Craça replaced Krabbé as co-host. Krabbé still served as voice-over host. The series was renewed for a fourteenth season in May 2026.

The central focus of the show is the singing talent and quality of the contestants. Three or four coaches, themselves successful performing artists, train the talents in their teams, and occasionally perform with them. After many preliminary off-screen audition rounds, the most promising talents are selected for the televised shows. Crucially, this happens in so-called "blind auditions", during which the coaches cannot see, but only hear the candidates perform. Not until the talent gets chosen by a coach, or when they have finished singing, do the coaches' chairs rotate towards them, and are they revealed to the coaches.

The first episodes are pre-recorded in front of a live studio audience, so that the coaches can experience the audience's reaction to the candidate, and are sometimes influenced by it. The following episodes are recorded wherein some singers lose their spot on the team, and others are promoted to subsequent rounds, through singing challenges in various formats, until only a small group remain in the competition. The format then switches to several live shows, in which the audience take an active part in the judging process, and more singers are voted out until one winner remains. The thirteenth season was entirely pre-recorded, with live voting by viewers being possible during the broadcast of the finale.

== Format ==
Promotional photograph of the Coaches of season 2 of The Voice of Holland

=== Blind auditions ===
After many audition rounds off screen it's time for the "Blind auditions". In the first televised stage the auditioners sing in front of the official coaches. All coaches will be sitting in a chair that is turned back from the stage. Supposedly the coaches will first judge by the power, clarity, type and uniqueness of the artists singing. If they like what they hear and want to mentor the artist for the next stage, they will push a button that will turn their chair around to face the stage for the first time and see the artist. If more than one chair turns around, the auditioner can pick their coach of choice. If no chair turns around, the auditioning artist's journey on the Voice ends.

At the end, each of the coaches will have a certain number of artists in their team who will be advancing to the next round. A new twist was added on the twelfth season: the block button. Each coach has the power to block another coach from getting an artist. To ensure that the coaches will not block each other indefinitely, it is only allowed to use the block button once in the entire blind auditions.

=== The Battle rounds ===
The second stage, 'the Battle rounds', is where two artists are mentored and then developed by their respective coach. The coaches of the team will "dedicate themselves to developing their artists, giving them advice, and sharing the secrets of their success in the music industry". Every member of their team battle against another member from their team. They sing the same song simultaneously, while their coach decides who should continue in the competition. The coaches have to choose from the four individual "battles" to take artists to the live round. Starting from the fourth season, each coach can steal one losing artist from other teams. Another twist was added in the seventh season: the Steal Room. While steals have returned, each artist that is stolen will sit in a designated seat in the Steal Room as they watch the other performances. If a coach has stolen one artist but later decides to steal another, the first artist will be replaced and eliminated by the newly-stolen artist. The artists seated at the end of the battles will advance to the knockout rounds. In the eleventh season, each coach is now allowed to save an artist from their own team.

=== The Knockouts ===
From the sixth season onwards, the Knockouts were added as third stage before the live shows. The format has varied from the early seasons where two artists each sang one song with one advancing to more recent years where all artists performed and the coach would select three to send to the Live Shows.

=== Live shows ===
The final stage, dubbed the 'Live shows', is where the surviving combatants perform in front of the coaches, audience and broadcast live. Each coach will be having four artists in their team to begin with and the artists will go head-to-head in the competition to win the public votes. These will determine which artist advances to the final eight. The remaining three artists' future in the show will be determined by the coaches, choosing who will progress.

The final eight artists will compete in a live broadcast. However, the coaches will have a 50/50 say with the audience and the public in deciding which artists move on to the 'final four' phase. In the latter, each coach will have one member who will continue. The final (the winner round) will be decided upon by the public vote. Throughout the final the coaches will frequently perform with their artists. The winner will be crowned The Voice of Holland.

== Coaches and hosts ==
The coaches were not yet known during the show's establishment announcement, but Gordon, Marco Borsato and John Ewbank were rumored to be participating. None of them eventually ended up in the original line-up. The coaches were announced on 17 June 2010: Roel van Velzen, Nick & Simon, Angela Groothuizen and Jeroen van der Boom. In the first season, Roel van Velzen could not attend all live shows because of planned concerts. Martijn Krabbé hosted the show, with Wendy van Dijk joining him in the live shows and Winston Gerschtanowitz in charge of hosting the "Red Room".

Marco Borsato replaced Jeroen van der Boom in the second season, as Van der Boom left the show to become the head judge of The Winner Is, whereas Wendy van Dijk became the full-time host alongside Krabbé. In the third season, Groothuizen was replaced by Trijntje Oosterhuis, who had previously turned down the chance to join the show's first season. On 17 December 2012, it was announced that Nick & Simon would not return as coaches in the fourth season. On 22 March 2013, it was announced that Ilse DeLange would become a coach in the fourth season. In January, Roel van Velzen announced he would not return as a coach for a fourth season and was replaced by Ali B. The coaching panel remained unchanged for season 5 in 2014, but Winston Gerschtanowitz was replaced by Idols winner Jamai Loman.

On 15 January 2015, it was announced that Trijntje Oosterhuis and Ilse DeLange had left the show to focus on other projects, and would be replaced by Anouk and Miss Montreal frontwoman Sanne Hans. Marco Borsato and Ali B returned as coaches for the sixth season. During the season 6 finale on 29 January 2016, Borsato announced he would not be returning for the seventh season, and his position would be filled by Guus Meeuwis. Anouk originally signed to coach two seasons, but decided to skip the following season due to her pregnancy, therefore was replaced by Waylon in season 7. Guus Meeuwis decided at the end of season 7 not to return for the eighth season. On 9 June 2017, it was announced that Anouk would return to replace Guus Meeuwis for season 8, along with returning coaches Ali B, Sanne Hans and Waylon. During the season 8 finale on 2 January 2018, it was announced that for the ninth season, Lil' Kleine would replace Sanne Hans, who had decided to leave for other commitments.

In early 2019, Wendy van Dijk announced that she has moved from RTL 4 to SBS6 and therefore would not be able to return to the show as host. On 22 February 2019, it was reported that the show will continue airing on RTL 4 for the next three years, and Chantal Janzen will replace van Dijk as host for the tenth season. It has also been announced that Geraldine Kemper would replace Jamai Loman as backstage host. On 14 June 2019, it was announced via the show's broadcaster, RTL 4 and their Facebook page that all coaches from season 9 would return for season 10.

On 6 June 2020, RTL announced that Ali B, Waylon and Anouk would all remain on the panel for season 11; but Lil' Kleine would not return. Two months later, Jan Smit was confirmed as Kleine's replacement. In July 2021, it was confirmed that Glennis Grace would replace Smit, who had confirmed his departure weeks prior. Also, season 12 includes the "Comeback Stage" (originally created by the American version), whose duo coach consists in rapper Typhoon and season 6 winner Maan de Steenwinkel. However, the panel for season 12 were featured for only two episodes before the show went suspended.

On 31 March 2025, it was announced that DeLange would return as a coach for the revival of the show, set to air January 2026. At the same time, it was announced that Willie Wartaal, Suzan & Freek, and Dinand Woesthoff would debut as coaches for season 13. On 27 May 2025, Suzan & Freek withdrew from the coaching panel following Freek's diagnosis with terminal cancer, but rejoined on 4 July 2025 after it was announced that Freek was receiving treatment and was on a more positive trajectory. In May 2026, all five coaches were confirmed to return for season 14.

Coaches

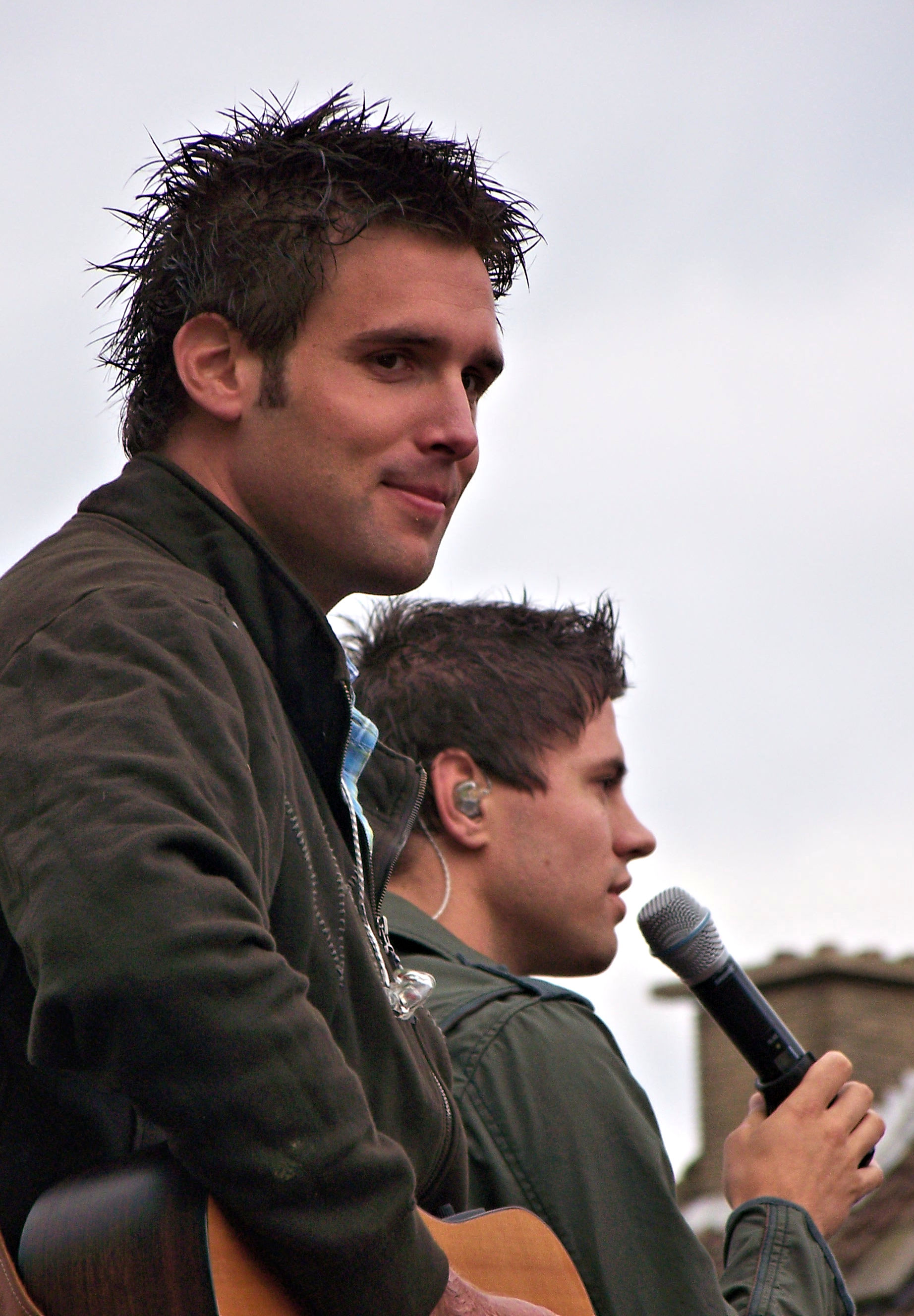
Nick & Simon (1–3)

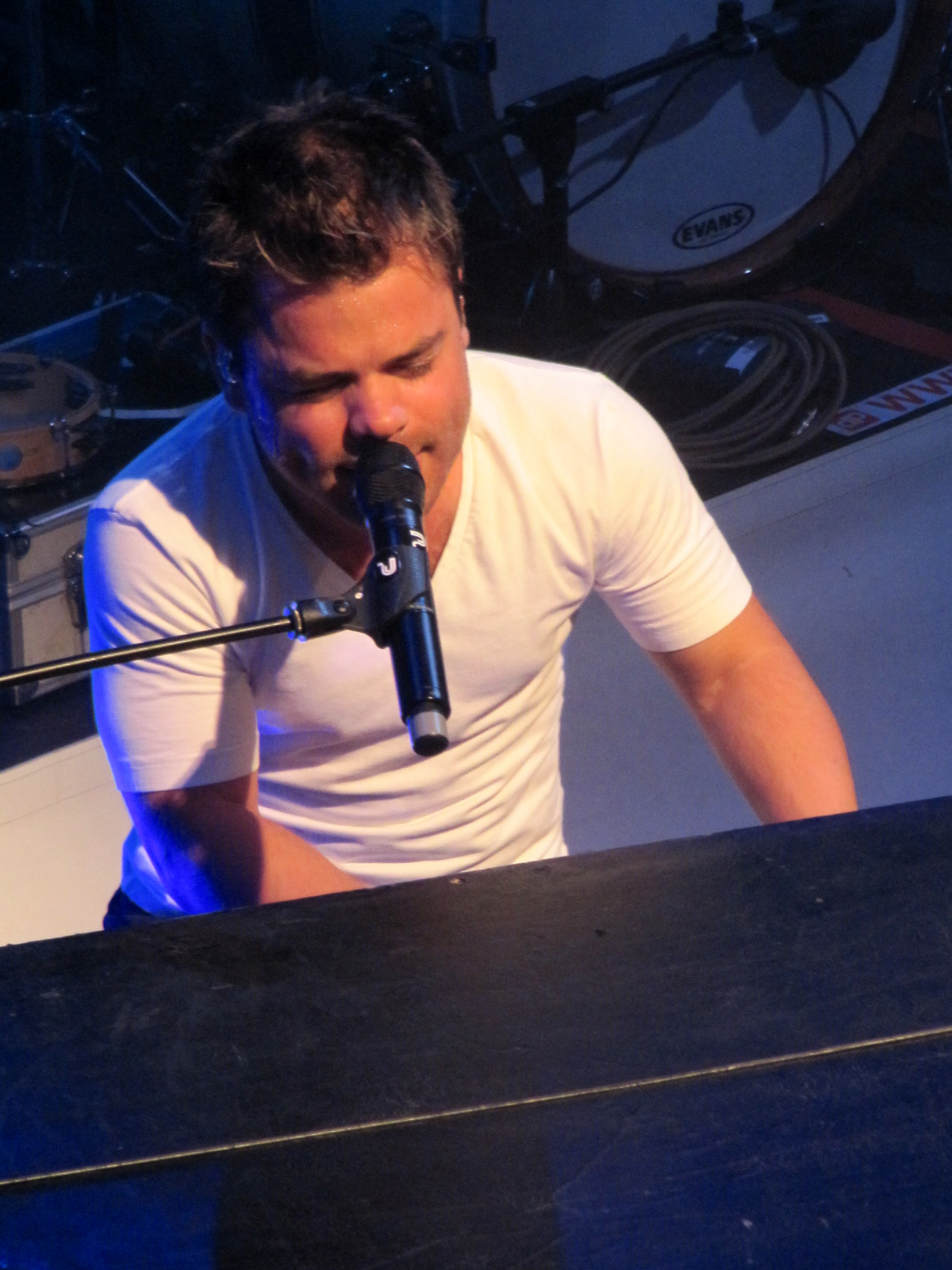
Roel van Velzen (1–3)

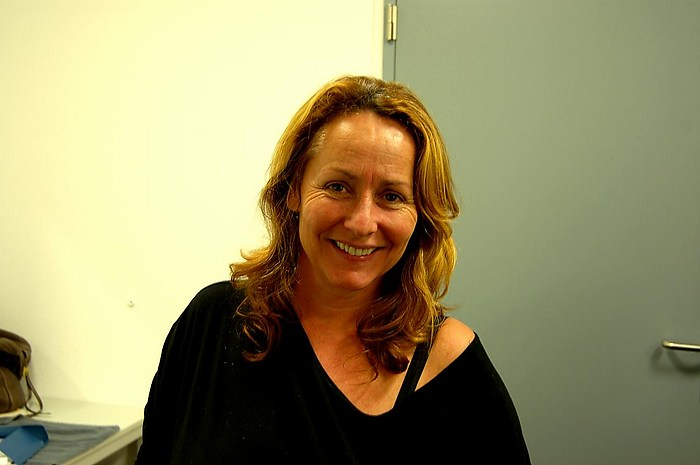
Angela Groothuizen (1–2)

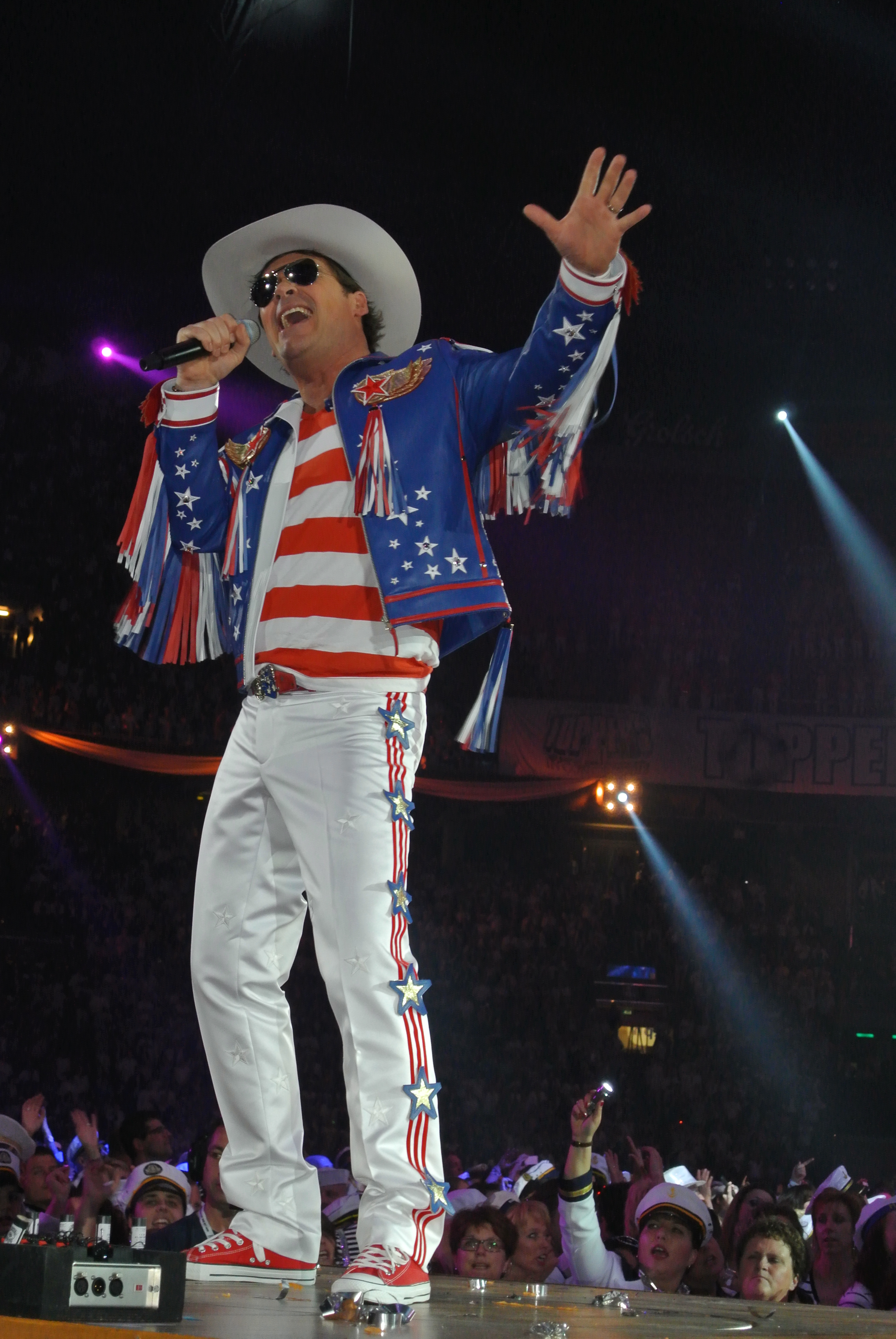
Jeroen van der Boom (1)

Marco Borsato (2–6)

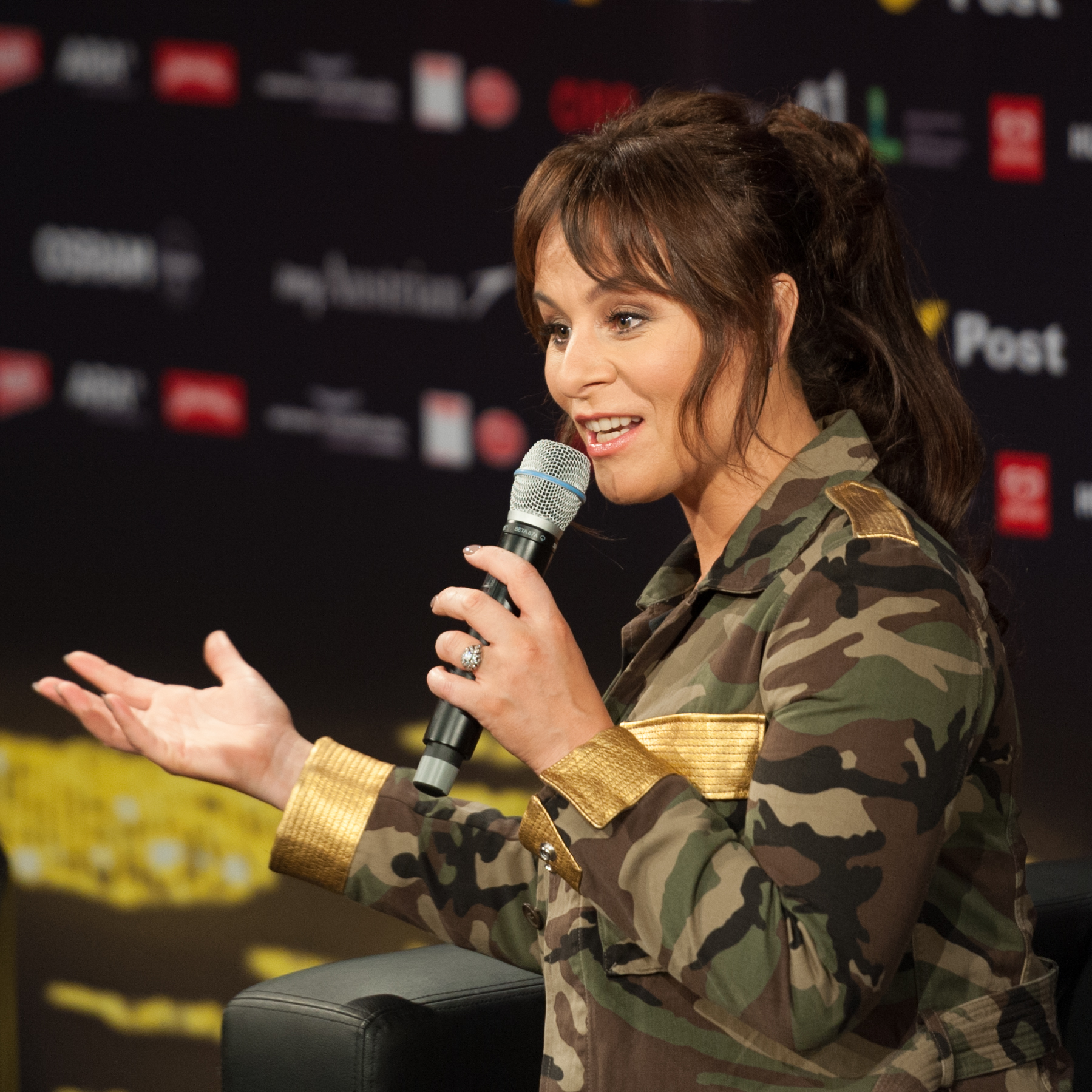
Trijntje Oosterhuis (3–5)

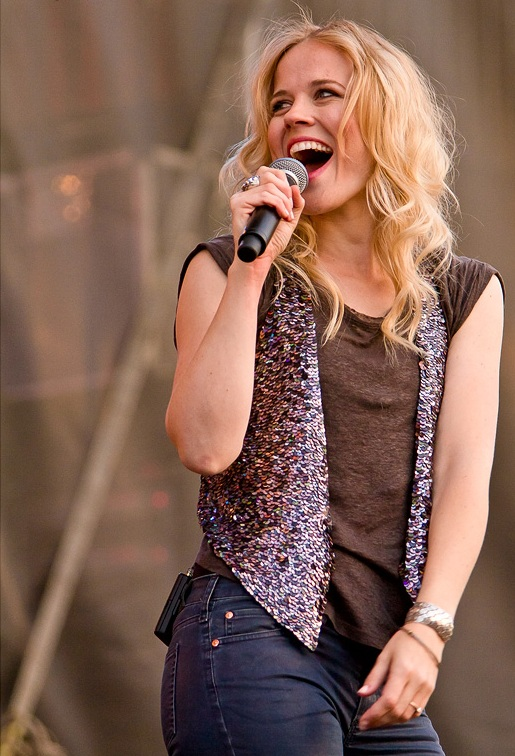
Ilse DeLange (4–5, 13–present)

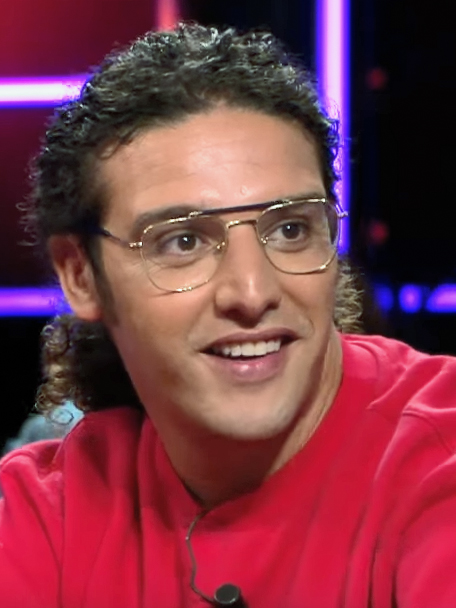
Ali B (4–12)

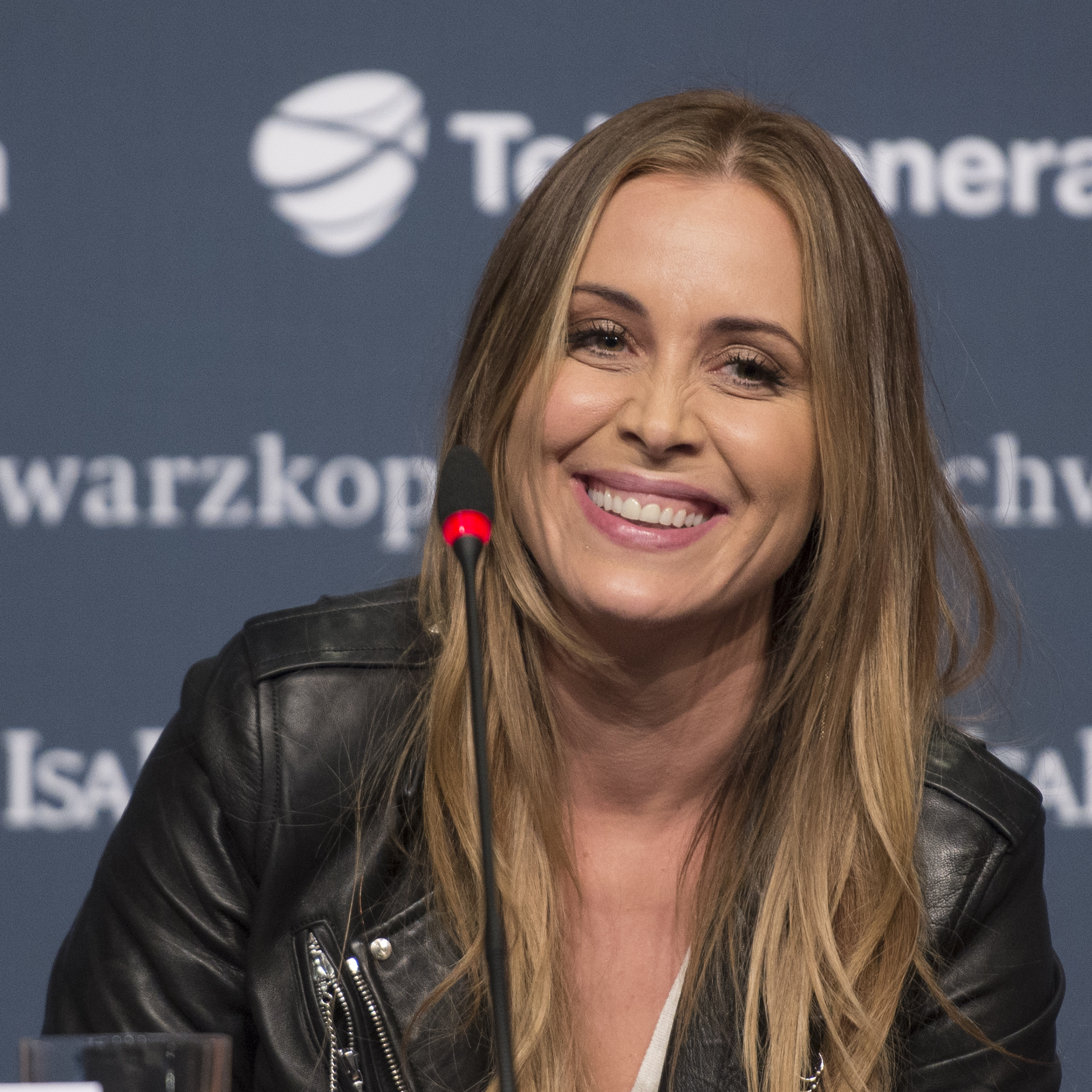
Anouk (6, 8–12)

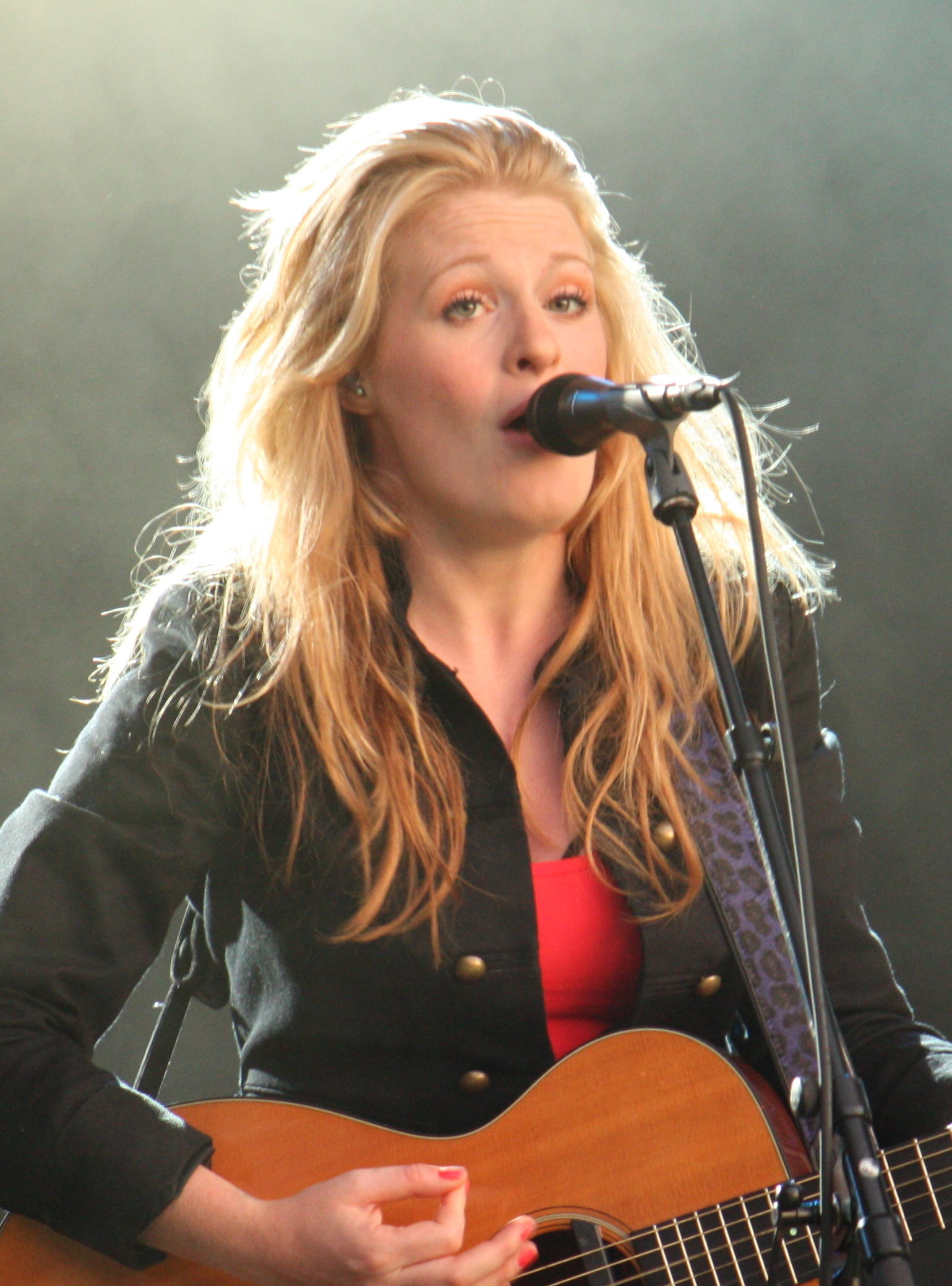
Sanne Hans (6–8)

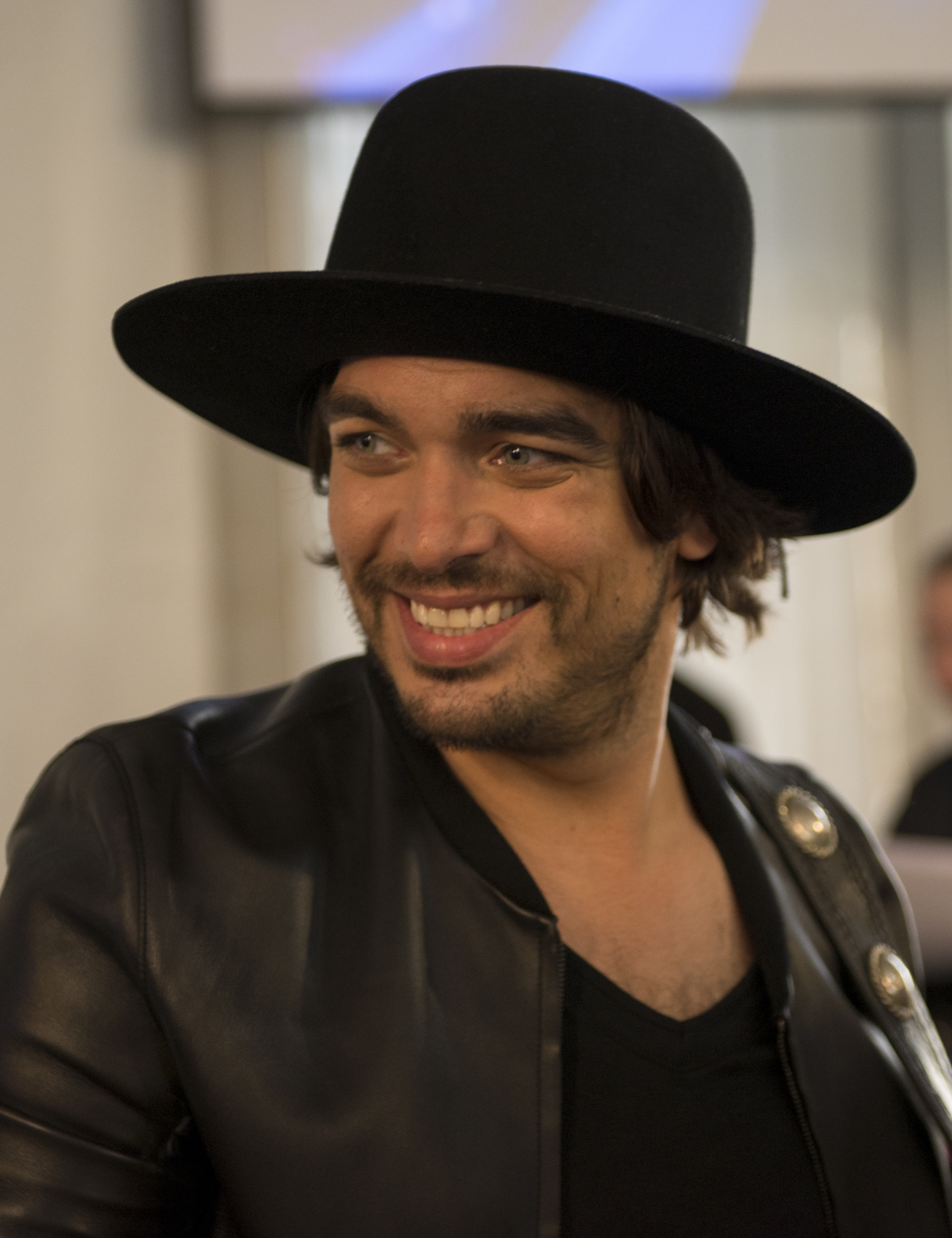
Waylon (7–12)

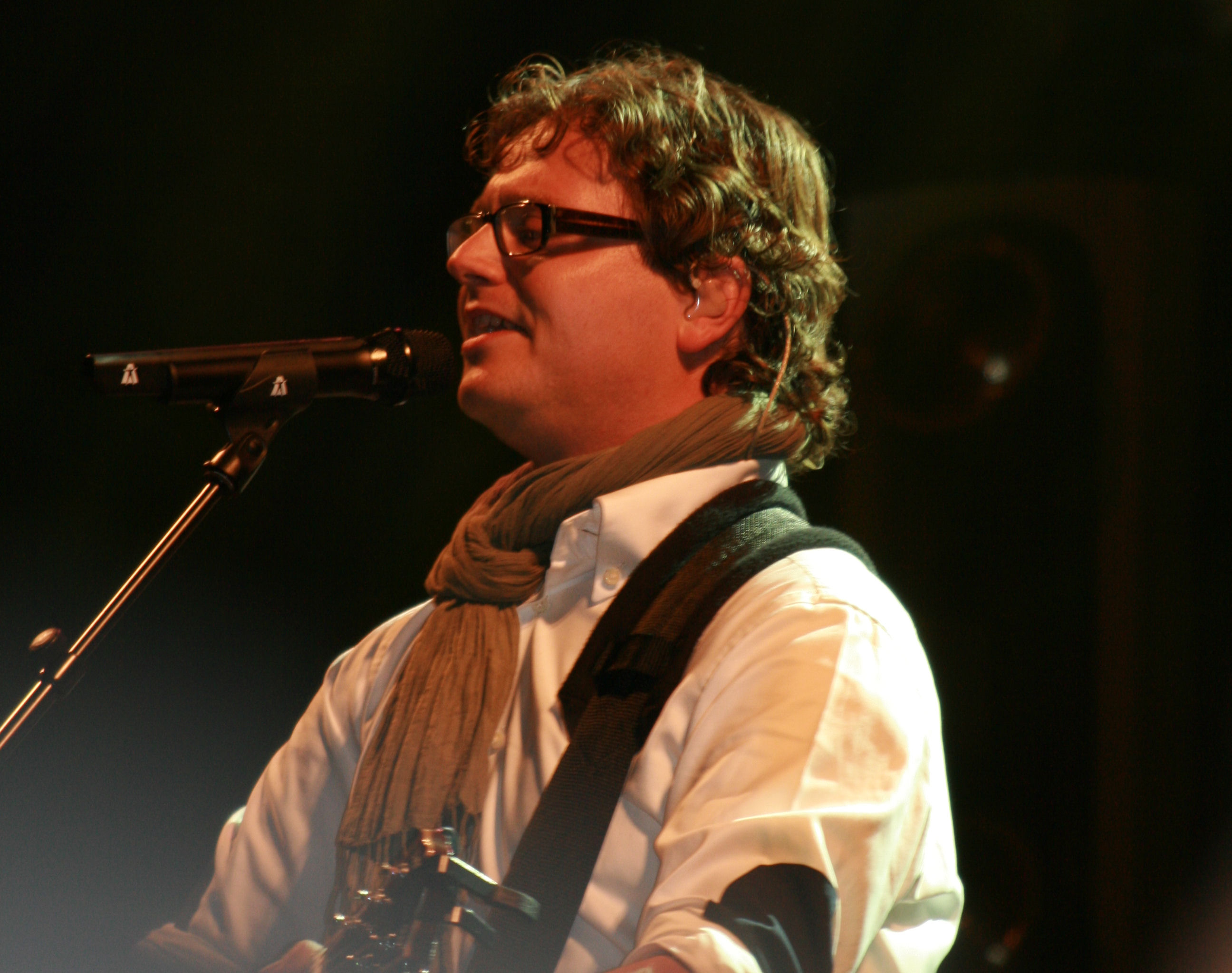
Guus Meeuwis (7)

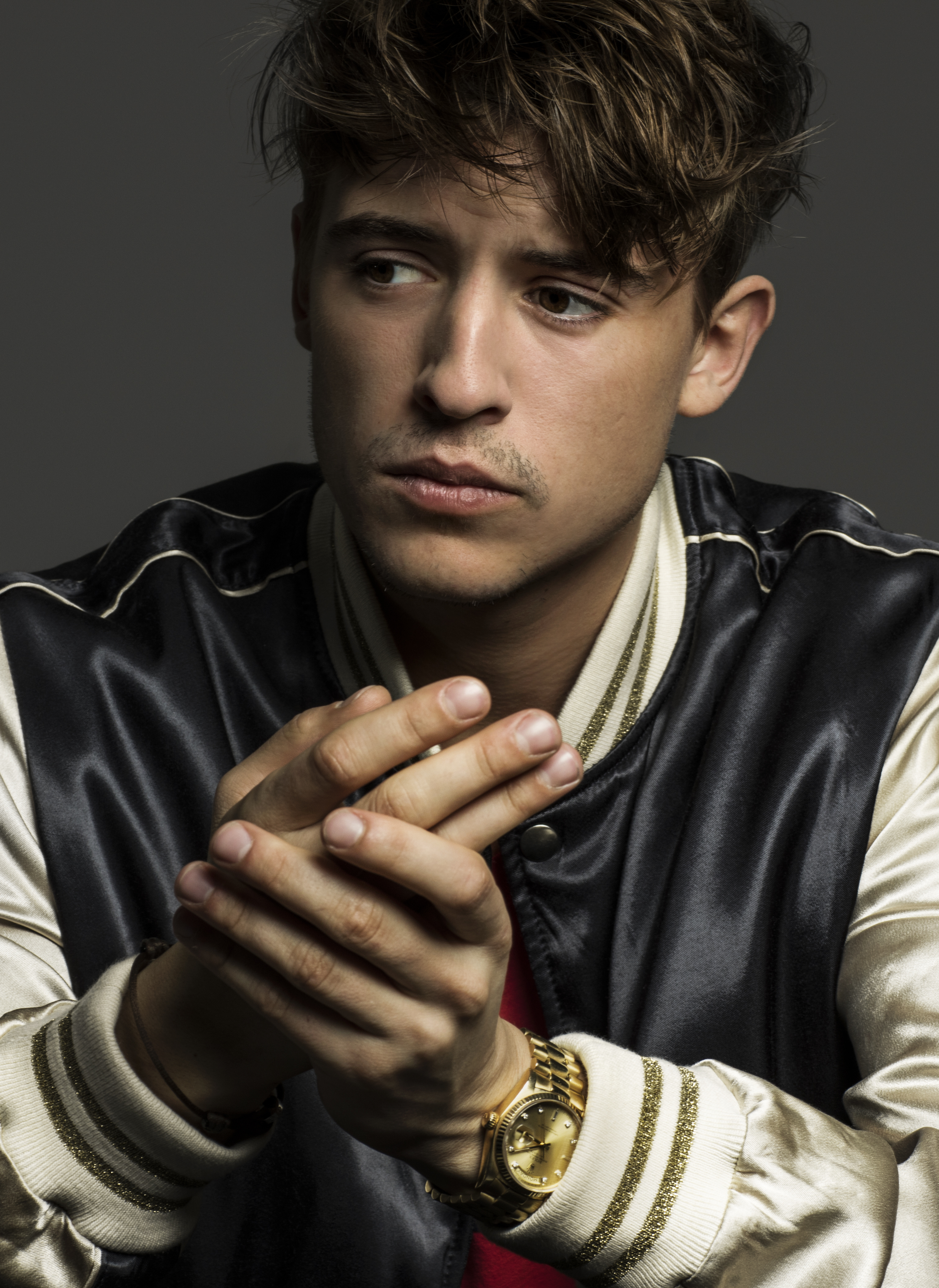
Lil' Kleine (9–10)

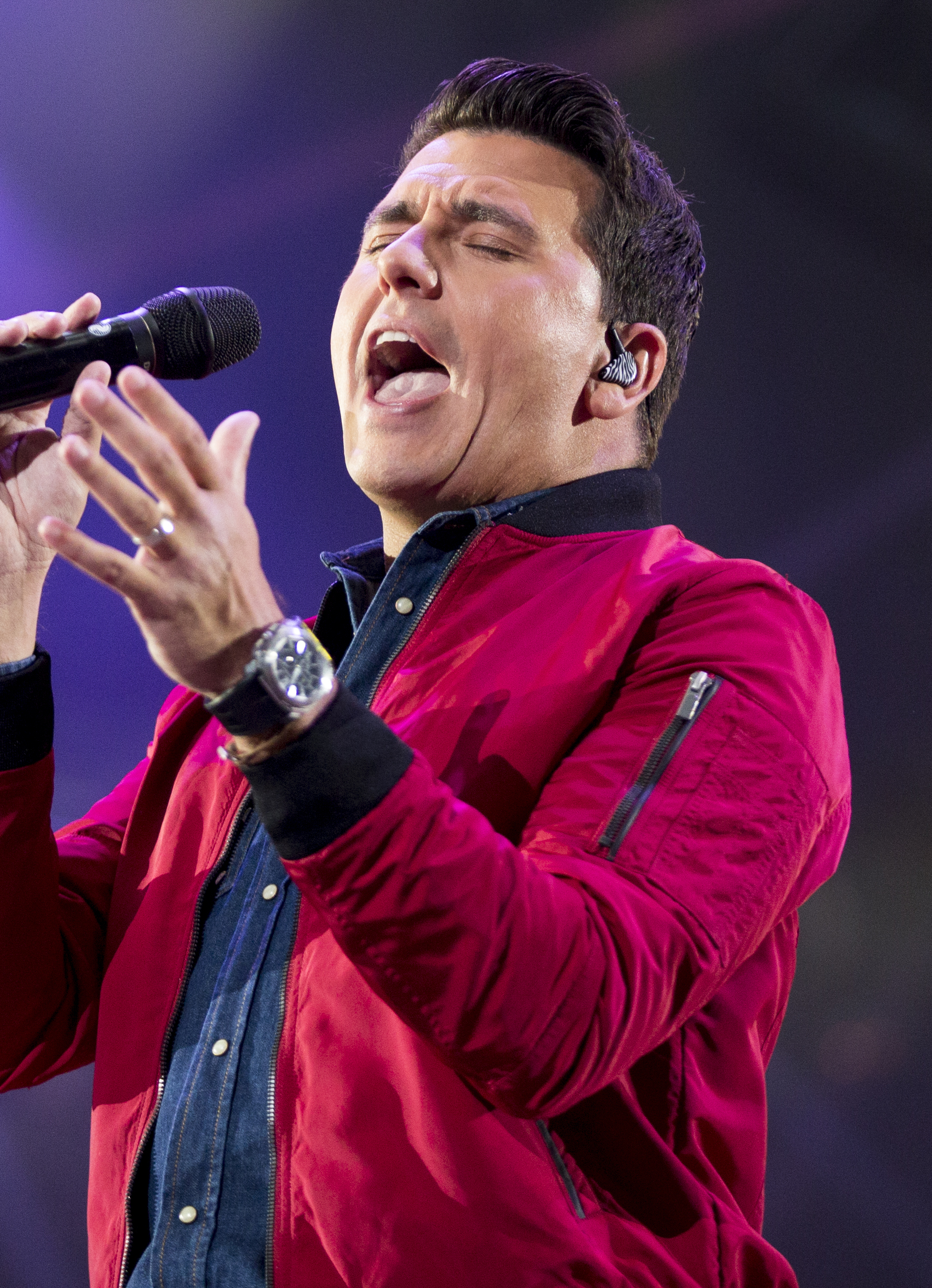
Jan Smit (11)

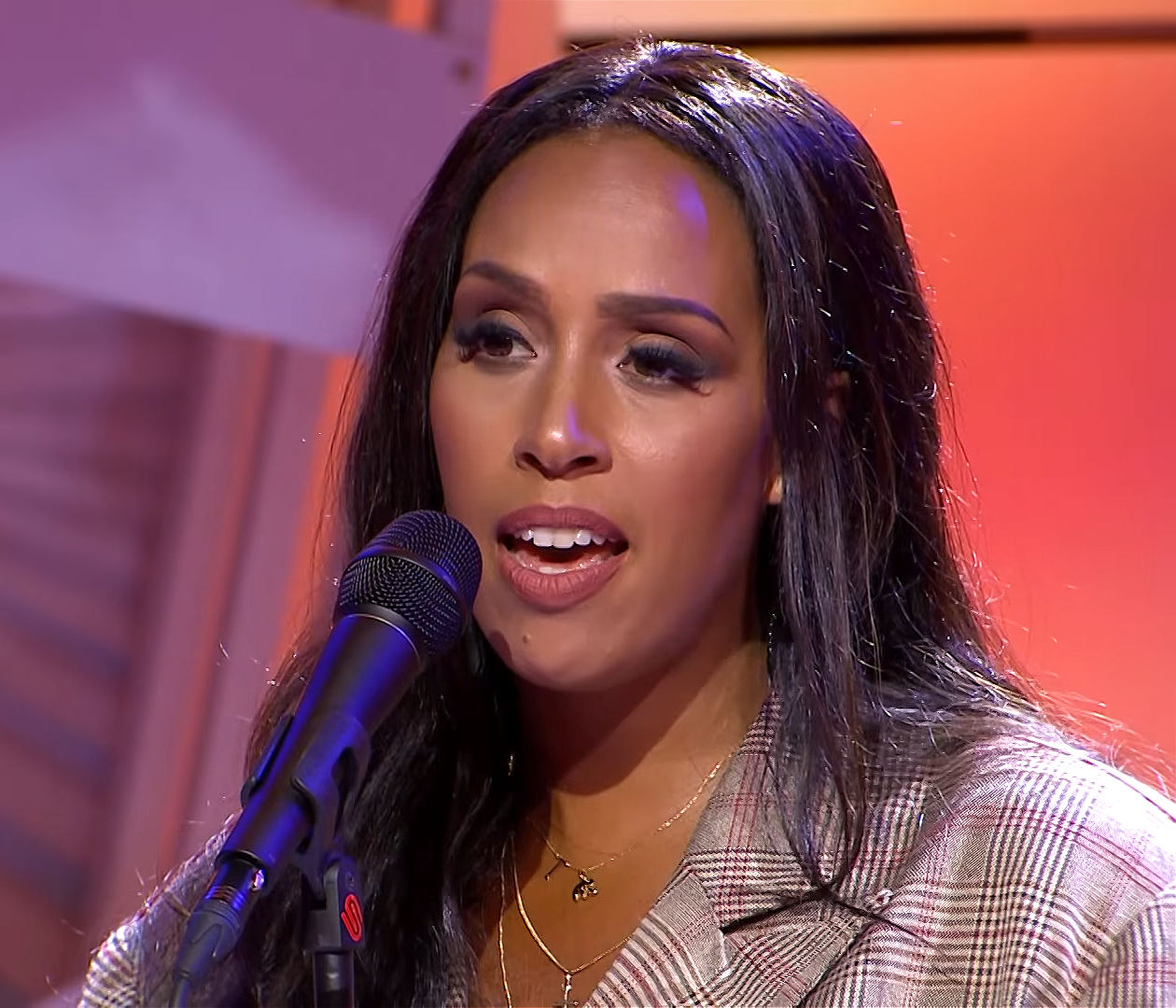
Glennis Grace (12)

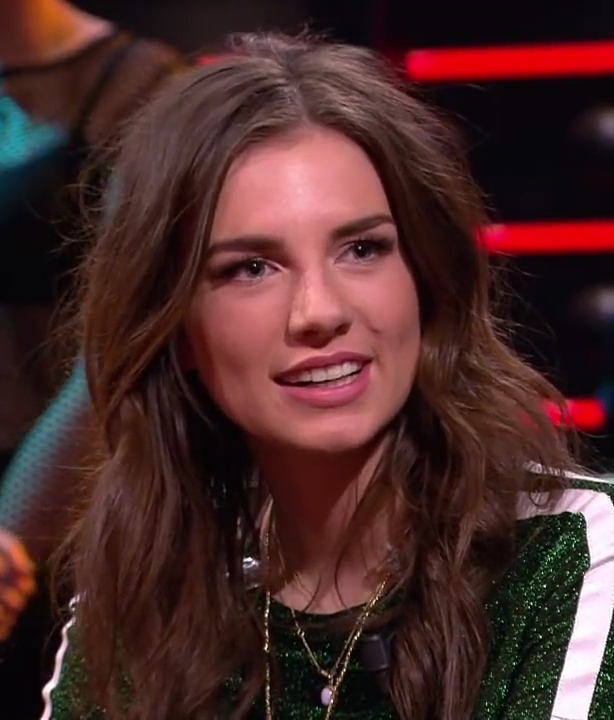
Maan de Steenwinkel (Comeback Stage, duo, 12)

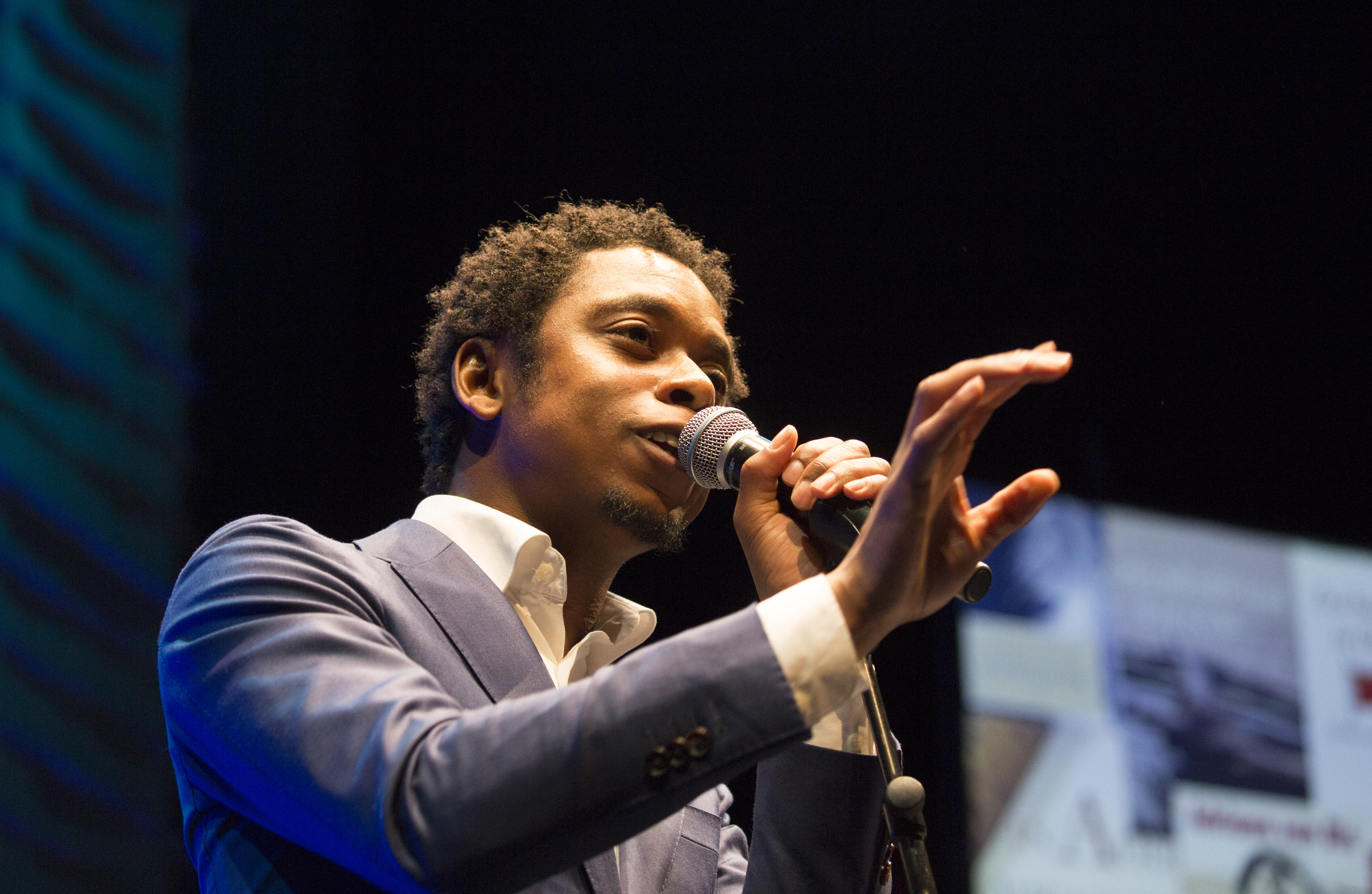
Typhoon (Comeback Stage, duo, 12)

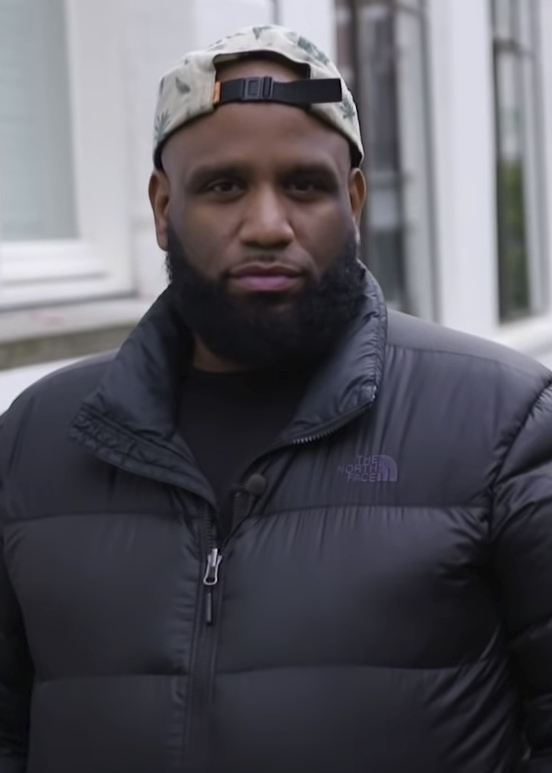
Willie Wartaal (13–present)

Suzan & Freek (13–present)

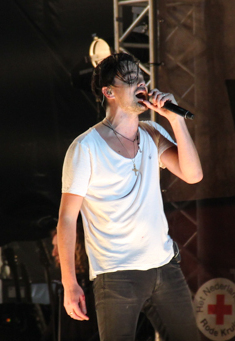
Dinand Woesthoff (13–present)

=== Coaches' timeline ===
Coaches	Seasons													
Coaches	1	2	3	4	5	6	7	8	9	10	11	12 (Note: The twelfth season aired two episodes before permanently concluding. Thus, the cast was featured for only two blind auditions episodes.)	13	14
Nick & Simon														
Roel van Velzen														
Angela Groothuizen														
Jeroen van der Boom														
Marco Borsato														
Trijntje Oosterhuis														
Ali B														
Ilse DeLange														
Sanne Hans														
Anouk														
Waylon														
Guus Meeuwis														
Lil' Kleine														
Jan Smit														
Glennis Grace														
Willie Wartaal														
Suzan & Freek														
Dinand Woesthoff														

=== Line-up of Coaches ===
Coaches' line-up by chairs order
Season	Year	Coaches			
Season	Year	1	2	3	4
1	2010-11	Jeroen	Angela	Nick & Simon	Van Velzen
2	2011-12	Marco	Angela	Nick & Simon	Van Velzen
3	2012	Marco	Trijntje	Nick & Simon	Van Velzen
4	2013	Trijntje	Ali B	Ilse	Marco
5	2014	Ilse	Ali B	Marco	Trijntje
6	2015-16	Anouk	Ali B	Sanne	Marco
7	2016-17	Waylon	Sanne	Ali B	Guus
8	2017-18	Waylon	Sanne	Ali B	Anouk
9	2018-19	Lil Kleine	Anouk	Ali B	Waylon
10	2019-20	Lil Kleine	Ali B	Anouk	Waylon
11	2020-21	Anouk	Ali B	Jan	Waylon
12	2022	Ali B	Anouk	Glennis	Waylon
13	2026	Ilse	Willie	Suzan & Freek	Dinand
14	2027	Ilse	Willie	Suzan & Freek	Dinand

=== Hosts ===
Main

Main Hosts gallery

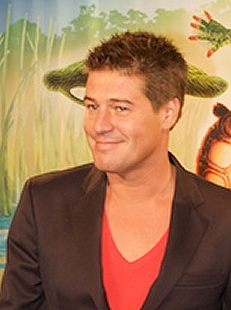
Martijn Krabbé (1–12, 13: voice only)

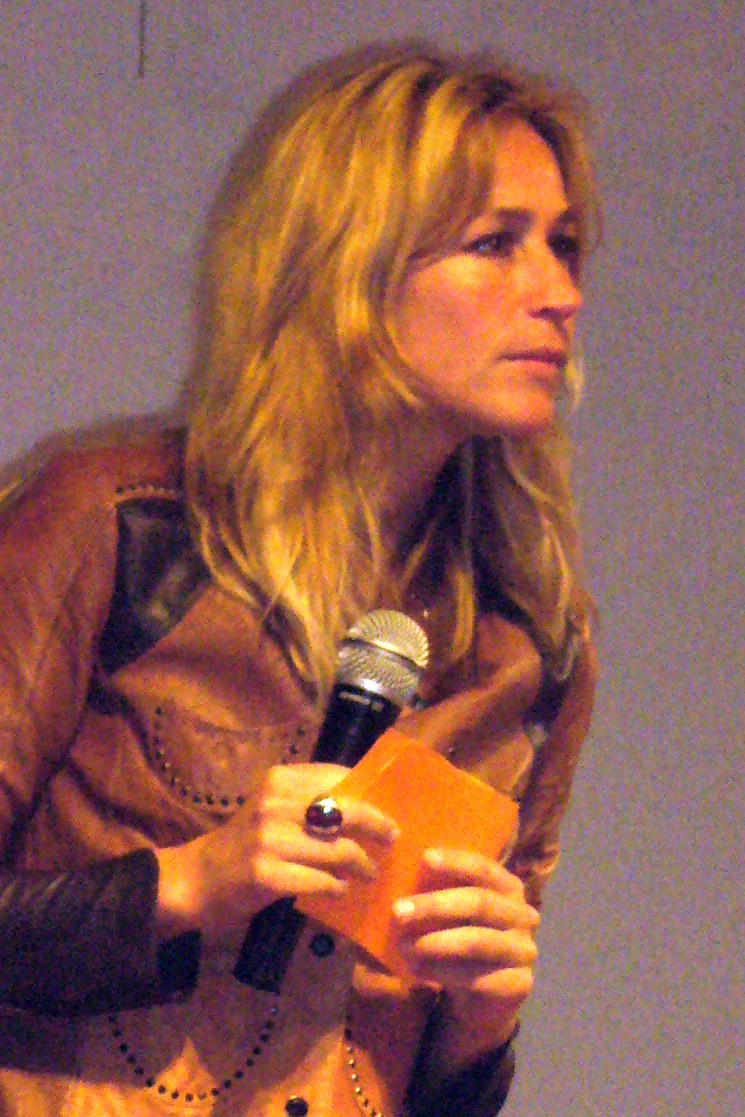
Wendy van Dijk (1–9)

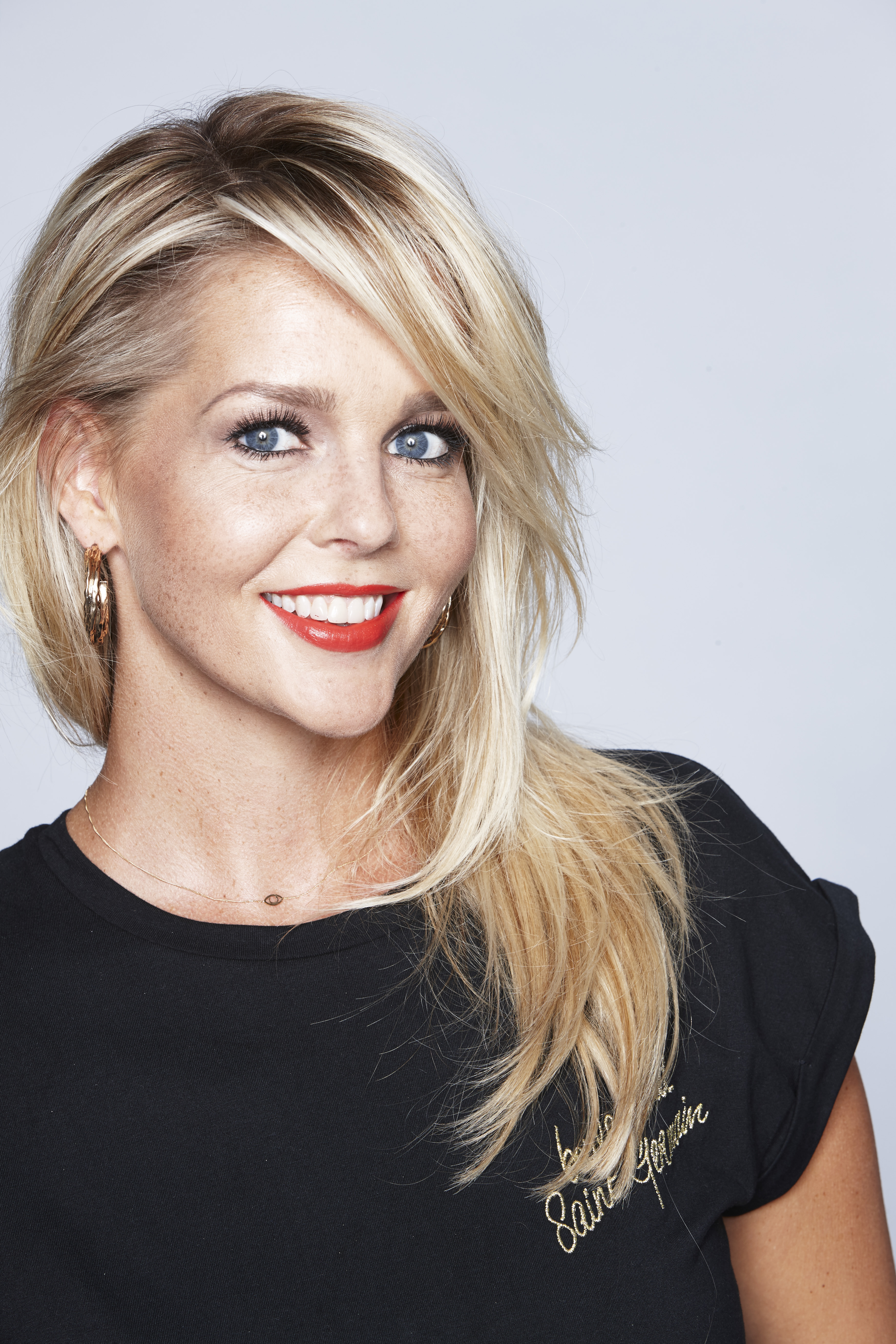
Chantal Janzen (10–present)

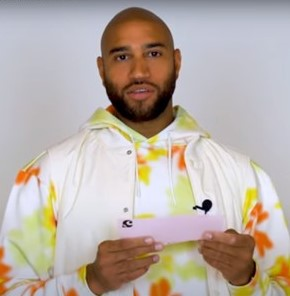
Edson da Graça (13–present)

Hosts		Seasons													
Hosts		1	2	3	4	5	6	7	8	9	10	11	12 (Note: The twelfth season aired two episodes before permanently concluding. Thus, the cast was featured for only two blind auditions episodes.)	13	14
Main	Martijn Krabbé														
Main	Wendy van Dijk	(Note: Van Dijk was only hosting the live shows, together with Krabbé.)													
Main	Chantal Janzen														
Main	Edson da Graça														

== Series overview ==
Warning: the following table presents a significant amount of different colors.

Teams color key
Artist from Team Van Velzen	Artist from Team Ilse	Artist from Team Jan
Artist from Team Nick & Simon	Artist from Team Ali B	Artist from Team Suzan & Freek
Artist from Team Angela	Artist from Team Sanne	Artist from Team Dinand
Artist from Team Jeroen	Artist from Team Anouk	Artist from Team Willie
Artist from Team Marco	Artist from Team Waylon
Artist from Team Trijntje	Artist from Team Guus

Season	Aired	Winner	Other finalists			Winning Coach	Hosts
1	2010-2011	Ben Saunders	Pearl Jozefzoon	Kim de Boer	Leonie Meijer	Roel van Velzen	Martijn Krabbé, Wendy van Dijk
2	2011-2012	Iris Kroes	Chris Hordijk	Erwin Nyhoff	Paul Turner	Marco Borsato	Martijn Krabbé, Wendy van Dijk
3	2012	Leona Philippo	Johannes Rypma	Floortje Smit	Ivar Oosterloo	Trijntje Oosterhuis	Martijn Krabbé, Wendy van Dijk
4	2013	Julia van der Toorn	Mitchell Brunings	Gerrie Dantuma	Jill Helena	Marco Borsato	Martijn Krabbé, Wendy van Dijk
5	2014	O'G3NE	Sjors van der Panne	Guus Mulder	Emmaly Brown	Marco Borsato	Martijn Krabbé, Wendy van Dijk
6	2015-2016	Maan de Steenwinkel	Dave Vermeulen	Brace	Jennie Lena	Marco Borsato	Martijn Krabbé, Wendy van Dijk
7	2016-2017	Pleun Bierbooms	Isabel Provoost	Vinchenzo Tahapary	Thijs Pot	Waylon	Martijn Krabbé, Wendy van Dijk
8	2017-2018	Jim van der Zee	Samantha Steenwijk	Nienke Wijnhoven	Demi van Wijngaarden	Anouk	Martijn Krabbé, Wendy van Dijk
9	2018-2019	Dennis van Aarssen	Navarone	Patricia Haastrecht	Menno Aben	Waylon	Martijn Krabbé, Wendy van Dijk
10	2019-2020	Sophia Kruithof	Stef Classens	Emma Boertien	Daphne van Ditshuizen	Anouk	Krabbé, Chantal Janzen
11	2020-2021	Dani van Velthoven	Sem Rozendaal	Nienke Fitters	Jasper Wever	Anouk	Krabbé, Chantal Janzen
12	2022	—N/a (Note: Due to the series only airing two blind auditions episodes, there were no finalists.)					Krabbé, Chantal Janzen
13	2026	Ruben Hillen	Sanne van Assouw	Nieloefaar Bahadori	Thijs Veldhuis	Suzan & Freek	Janzen, Edson da Graça
14	2027	Upcoming season					Janzen, Edson da Graça

== Coaches' results ==
Considering the final placement of the contestants who are members of their team (not the final placement of the coaches):

Coaches' results
Coach	Winner	Runner-up	Third place	Fourth place
Marco Borsato	4 times (2, 4-6)	Once (5)	Once (4)	Once (3)
Anouk	Thrice (8, 10-11)	Once (9)	Once (8)	Once (6)
Waylon	Twice (7, 9)	Twice (10-11)	Twice (9-10)	—
Roel van Velzen	Once (1)	—	Once (3)	Once (2)
Trijntje Oosterhuis	Once (3)	—	—	Once (5)
Suzan & Freek	Once (13)	—	—	—
Nick & Simon	—	Thrice (1-3)	—	—
Sanne Hans	—	Thrice (6-8)	—	—
Ilse DeLange	—	Twice (4, 13)	—	—
Willie Waartal	—	Once (13)	—	—
Dinand Woesthoff	—	Once (13)	—	—
Ali B	—	—	4 times (5-7, 11)	4 times (4, 8-10)
Angela Groothuizen	—	—	Twice (1-2)	—
Jeroen van der Boom	—	—	—	Once (1)
Guus Meeuwis	—	—	—	Once (7)
Jan Smit	—	—	—	Once (11)
Lil' Kleine	—	—	—	—

== Coaches and their finalists ==
Contestant placing

- Winner
- Runner-up
- Third place
- Fourth place

- Winners are in bold, the finalists in the finale are in italicized font, and the eliminated artists are in small font.

Season	Coaches and their finalists			
1	Jeroen van der Boom	Angela Groothuizen	Nick & Simon	Roel van Velzen
1	Leonie Meijer; Anne Hoogendoorn; Meike van der Veer; Raffaëla Paton; Ray Klaassen; Kevin Okkema	Kim de Boer; Shary-An Nivillac; Bart van Overbeek; Nyssina Swerissen; Charlotte ten Brink; Wiep Laurenssen	Pearl Jozefzoon; Jennifer Ewbank; Nigel Brown; Johnny Rosenberg; Shemsi Mushkolaj; Davy & Joshua	**Ben Saunders**; Esther Nijhove; Lenny Keylard; Sarina Voorn; Joan Franka; Kiki Vermeulen
2	Marco Borsato	Angela Groothuizen	Nick & Simon	Roel van Velzen
2	**Iris Kroes**; Sharon Doorson; Bart Brandjes; Marieke Dollekamp; Nora Dalal; Ivanildo Kembel	Erwin Nyhoff; Niels Geusebroek; Laura Estévez; Rodney Elzer; Daniel van der Zee; Gino Emnes	Chris Hordijk; Charly Luske; Marloes van Ommen; Danjil Tuhumena; Emmanuel Anning; Jomy Boky	Paul Turner; Wouter Vink; Michelle Flemming; Guy Barzily; Sacha van Beek; Christopher Max
3	Marco Borsato	Trijntje Oosterhuis	Nick & Simon	Roel van Velzen
3	Ivar Oosterloo; Barbara Straathof; Anja Dalhuisen; Babette van Vugt; Jared Hiwat; Pomme van de Ven; Niña van Dijk; Omri Tindal	**Leona Philippo**; Sandra van Nieuwland; Tessa Belinfante; Laurrhie Brouns; Velorisa Yorks; Ron Link; Patt Riley; Denzel Dongen	Johannes Rypma; Maame Joses; Salome Pieris; Claudia de Graaf; Mathijs Rumping; Janine Heines; Marx Margono; Nicola Ebbink	Floortje Smit; Eyelar Mirzazadeh; Marjet van den Brand; Sam "The Hedge" Holden; David Gonçalves; Randy Soewarno; Sifra Geessink; Katty Heath
4	Trijntje Oosterhuis	Ali B	Ilse DeLange	Marco Borsato
4	Wudstik; Shirma Rouse; Nicole Bus; Steffen Morrison; Matt Heanes; Sanne Klein Horsman; Nikay Agterhuis; Nikita Doornbosch	Jill Helena; Jennifer Lynn; Vince Irie; Collin de Vries; Imelda; Annika Boxhoorn; Yuli Minguel; Jarno Ibarra	Mitchell Brunings; Cheyenne Toney; Coosje Smid; Bylear Sumter; Darren van der Lek; Lizzy Osservoort; Gaby Boterkooper; Roy de Valk	**Julia van der Toorn**; Gerrie Dantuma; Märel Bijveld; Marvin Kneefel; Fantine Tho; Grant Scott; Steven de Geus; Sarah van der Meer
5	Emmaly Brown; David Dam; Romy Monteiro; Dennis Kroon; Pim Kouwenhoven; Sherefa Yorks; Eloy Smit; Daisy van Lingen	Guus Mulder; April & Dr. Rum; Ferry de Ruiter; Renee de Ruijter; Gabriella Massa; Ruben Tarmidi; Martha Hertogs; Vincent Vilouca	Duncan de Moor; Megan Brands; Sietske Oosterhuis; Kelly Cossee; Angela Vergouwen; Frank van Oudhuizen; Pip Alblas; Kimberley Janice	**O'G3NE**; Sjors van der Panne; MELL; Rob de Nijs; Graziëlla Hunsel; Abigail Martina; Bella; Dynah Dettingmeijer
6	Anouk	Ali B	Sanne Hans	Marco Borsato
6	Jennie Lena; Neda Boin	Brace; Ivar Vermeulen; Gaia Aikman; Natacha Carvalho	Dave Vermeulen; Ivan Peroti; Daniël Kist	**Maan de Steenwinkel**; Melissa Janssen; Jared Grant
7	Waylon	Sanne Hans	Ali B	Guus Meeuwis
7	**Pleun Bierbooms**; Yerry Rellum; Romy Weevers	Isabel Provoost; Kirsten Berkx; Sheela	Vinchenzo Tahapary; Dwight Dissels; Roza Lozica	Thijs Pot; Leon Sherman; Katell Chevalier
8	Waylon	Sanne Hans	Ali B	Anouk
8	Kimberly Maasdamme; Neema Silayio; Marchiano Markus	Samantha Steenwijk; Aïrto Edmundo; David van Rooij	Demi van Wijngaarden; Tjindjara Metschendorp; Ronald Klungel	**Jim van der Zee**; Nienke Wijnhoven; Gideon Luciana
9	Lil' Kleine	Anouk	Ali B	Waylon
9	Quido van de Graaf; Kimberly Fransens; Talita Blijd	Navarone; Mikki van Wijk; Irene Dings	Menno Aben; Sarah-Jane; Debrah Jade	**Dennis van Aarssen**; Patricia Van Haastrecht; Bryan B
10	Danilo Kuiters; Kes van den Broek; April Darby	**Sophia Kruithof**; Sanne Huisman; C.J.	Daphne van Ditshuizen; Ayoub Maach; Fatima Zohra	Stef Classens; Emma Boertien; Robin Buijs
11	Anouk	Ali B	Jan Smit	Waylon
11	**Dani van Velthoven**; Lucas van Roekel	Nienke Fitters; Alyssa van Ommeren	Jasper Wever; Dim de Groot	Sem Rozendaal; Channah Hewitt
12 (Note: Due to the series only airing two blind auditions episodes, there were no finalists.)	Ali B	Anouk	Glennis Grace	Waylon
12	Season cancelled			
13	Ilse DeLange	Willie Wartaal	Suzan & Freek	Dinand Woesthoff
13	Sanne van Assouw; Humphrey Nicolas Bacilio; Danitsia Sahadewsing	Nieloefaar Bahadori; Hailey Keller; Soufiane Soussan	**Ruben Hillen**; Nicole Laurore; Riley Ramos de Almeida	Thijs Veldhuis; Daan Appelman; Nanice Michiels

=== Season details ===
==== Season 1 (2010–2011) ====
In season one, coaches were Roel van Velzen, Jeroen van der Boom, Angela Groothuizen and Nick & Simon (working together). Host was Martijn Krabbé. The first season ended on 21 January 2011, Ben Saunders was declared the winner, with Pearl Jozefzoon as runner-up. Saunders won by 59% of the votes. An average of 2.7 million people watched the show every Friday since its launch, while the final attracted 3,744,000 viewers. The results show broadcast half an hour later attracted 3,238,000. In total, 30 of the show's singles reached the Top 100 download charts in the Netherlands, including 2 #1 chart toppers by winner Ben Saunders.

==== Season 2 (2011–2012) ====
Martijn Krabbé, who hosted season one, remained as the host but was now joined by Wendy van Dijk, with whom he was already sharing the hosting duties on Idols. Jeroen van der Boom did not return and was replaced by popular Dutch pop-artist Marco Borsato, who would eventually win the show with 19-year-old Iris Kroes on 20 January 2011 over Chris Hordijk for Team Nick & Simon, who again became the runners-up of the show. Kroes won over Hordijk with only 51% of the votes, making her the second female contestant worldwide to win the show after Steliyana Khristova, who won the Bulgarian version of the show.

==== Season 3 (2012) ====
The third season was hosted by Martijn Krabbé and Wendy van Dijk, while Winston Gerstanovich hosted the 'Red Room.' Roel van Velzen, Nick & Simon and Marco Borsato returned as coaches. Angela Groothuizen did not return as a coach for season 3 and was replaced by Trijntje Oosterhuis. On 15 December, Leona Philippo of Team Oosterhuis won with 56% of the votes, beating Johannes Rypma of Team Nick & Simon, Floortje Smit of Team van Velzen and Ivar Oosterloo of Team Borsato. The ratings for the last show where the highest ratings The Voice of Holland ever had. 4,6 million people watched the show.

==== Season 4 (2013) ====
The fourth season started in August 2013. Martijn Krabbé and Wendy van Dijk returned as co-hosts, while Winston Gerstanovich returned as host of the 'Red Room'. Marco Borsato and Trijntje Oosterhuis were the only coaches from season 3 to return. Ilse DeLange and Ali B replaced Nick & Simon and Roel van Velzen, respectively. Julia van der Toorn and Gerrie Dantuma of Team Borsato finished as winner and in third place respectively, making season 4 the first season to have two contestants of the same team in the final and the first where a coach did not win in their first season. Mitchell Brunnings of Team DeLange finished in second place and Jill Helena of Team Ali B finished in fourth place.

==== Season 5 (2014) ====
The fifth season premiered in August 2014 and ended in December. Martijn Krabbé and Wendy van Dijk will as co-hosts, but Winston Gerschtanowitz was replaced as host of the 'Red Room' by Jamai Loman. Marco Borsato, Trijntje Oosterhuis, Ilse DeLange and Ali B returned as coaches for the fifth season. Girl group O'G3NE and Sjors van der Panne, both from Borsato's team, finished in the final two, with the former winning the title and became the first trio to win in any season of The Voice.

==== Season 6 (2015–2016) ====
The sixth season premiered on 25 September 2015. Martijn Krabbé and Wendy van Dijk returned as co-hosts, and Jamai Loman returned as host of the 'Red Room' once again. Marco Borsato and Ali B returned as coaches and were joined by Anouk and Sanne Hans, who replaced Trijntje Oosterhuis and Ilse DeLange.

==== Season 7 (2016–2017) ====
The seventh season premiered on 21 October 2016. All hosts and co-hosts returned from last season. Ali B and Sanne Hans returned as coaches for this season, whereas Marco Borsato and Anouk were replaced by Guus Meeuwis and Waylon.

==== Season 8 (2017–2018) ====
The eighth season premiered on 20 October 2017. On 9 June 2017, it was announced that Anouk, who had been a coach in the sixth season of the show, would return to replace Guus Meeuwis, alongside Ali B, Sanne Hans and Waylon.

==== Season 9 (2018–2019) ====
The ninth season premiered on 2 November 2018. On 2 January 2018, it was announced that Lil' Kleine would replace Sanne Hans, alongside Ali B, Anouk and Waylon.

==== Season 10 (2019–2020) ====
The tenth season premiered on 8 November 2019. On 14 June 2019, it was confirmed on the show's Facebook page that all four coaches from the previous season would return. The winner of the 10th season was Sophia from team Anouk.

==== Season 11 (2020–2021) ====
The eleventh season premiered on 20 November 2020. On 7 August 2020, it was announced that Jan Smit would replace Lil' Kleine for season 11, joining returning coaches Ali B, Waylon and Anouk.

==== Season 12 (2022) ====
The twelfth season premiered on 7 January 2022. It was announced that would Glennis Grace would replace Jan Smit for season 12, joining returning coaches Ali B, Waylon, and Anouk. For the first time, the show will feature a fifth coach, with rapper Typhoon and season 6 winner Maan de Steenwinkel, who selected participants taking part in the Comeback stage. In addition, this season also marks the introduction of the block button in the show's history, as first introduced in the fourteenth season of the American version. Each coach has one chance to block another coach in the entire blind auditions.

The season concluded prematurely after two episodes due to sexual misconduct allegations relating to crew members of the show that surfaced shortly after the season began airing. Anouk announced that she would not be returning to the show in response. On 19 January 2022, RTL suspended its collaboration with coach Ali B until the allegations were investigated. By 6 May, one more ex-contestant pressed charges at a production member, raising the number of criminal charges under investigation in the show's production to a total of six.

==== Season 13 (2026) ====
The thirteenth season premiered on 16 January 2026, four years following the show's suspension. Former coach Ilse DeLange returned for her third season on the panel after a seven-season hiatus and was joined by debuting coaches Willie Wartaal, Suzan & Freek, and Dinand Woesthoff. On 27 May 2025, Suzan & Freek withdrew from the panel after Freek's diagnosis with terminal cancer; however, on 4 July 2025, the duo rejoined the panel following a more positive diagnosis in Freek's health.

==== Season 14 (2027) ====
The fourteenth season will premiere in early 2027. On 6 May 2026, it was announced that all four coaches from the previous season; Ilse DeLange, Willie Wartaal, Suzan & Freek and Dinand Woesthoff; would return to the show, assuming Suzan + freeks health doesn’t decline.

== Filming locations ==
Blind Auditions
Battles
Knockouts
Live shows

Location		Season												
Location		1	2	3	4	5	6	7	8	9	10	11	12	13
Hilversum	De Vorstin													
Amsterdam	Westergasfabriek													
Ede	Studio Lukkien													
Bussum	Spant!													
Hilversum	Studio 22													
Hilversum	Studio 24													
Haarlemmermeer	SugarCity													
Baarn	Studio Baarn													
Haarlem	Lichtfabriek													

== International franchises ==
Various international television networks have licensed or indicated interest in the format. More comprehensive information about the other versions of the show is in the "Main article".

- (United States) NBC — In December 2010, NBC announced that they had purchased the franchise rights to air an American version of the show. The show was initially named as The Voice of America but was later shortened to The Voice. Hosted by Carson Daly and Alison Haislip with CeeLo Green, Blake Shelton, Christina Aguilera and Adam Levine as coaches the show premiered on 26 April 2011.
- (Ukraine) 1+1 — On 22 May 2011, 1+1 network launched Holos Krayiny, the Ukrainian version of the show. Stas Piekha, Diana Arbenina, Oleksandr Ponomariov, and Ruslana served as the coaches, while Andriy Domanskyi and Katia Osadcha were the presenters of the said version.
- bTV — On 18 July 2011, The Voice of Bulgaria started airing on bTV. The coaches in the first season were Kiril Marichkov, Ivana, Miro and Mariana Popova and the hosts were Victoria Terziyska and Marten Roberto (in the lives).
- Top Channel — On 21 October 2011 Top Channel started airing the Albanian version of the show, called The Voice of Albania.
- RTP — From 29 October 2011 to 25 February 2012, RTP aired the Portuguese version, The Voice Portugal.
- vtm and RTBF's La Une — The Flemish part of Belgium started airing their own version of the show on 25 November 2011. It is broadcast on vtm, the main commercial television station in Flanders, Belgium and entitled The Voice van Vlaanderen. On the other hand, the French-speaking part of Belgium started airing their own version of the show, The Voice Belgique, on 20 December 2011. It is broadcast on RTBF's La Une, a public television station in the French-speaking part of Belgium.
- Telefe — Telefe began broadcasting from 1 July 2012 Argentine format, called La Voz Argentina, with the leadership of Marley and Luli Fernandez in the backstage. Mentors and juries are: Soledad Pastorutti, Axel, Ale Sergi and Juliana Gattas' group Miranda! And international coach Jose Luis "El Puma" Rodriguez. Since its inception, the program was a success.
- ProSieben — In December 2011, ProSieben started airing the German version of the show, The Voice of Germany with Rea Garvey, Nena, The BossHoss and Xavier Naidoo as coaches.
- (Spain) Telecinco — In December 2012, Telecinco started the Spanish version of the show, with Malú, Rosario Flores, Melendi and David Bisbal as coaches. It was called La Voz. In the second season, Antonio Orozco replaced Melendi, and actually, in the third season, Laura Pausini replaced Rosario Flores and Alejandro Sanz replaced David Bisbal.
- (United Kingdom) BBC One/ITV — In June 2011, the BBC announced the show, The Voice UK, will be aired on BBC One. It premiered on 24 March 2012 with Danny O'Donoghue, Jessie J, Sir Tom Jones and will.i.am sitting as the coaches; while Reggie Yates and Holly Willoughby served as the presenters of the show. In the third season, Kylie Minogue replaced Jessie J and Ricky Wilson replaced Danny O'Donoghue. In 2017, the show moved to ITV.
- (Mexico) Televisa — On 8 September 2011, the Mexican version of the show, La Voz... México, aired on Televisa's "Canal de las Estrellas". It featured Lucero, Aleks Syntek, Espinoza Paz and Alejandro Sanz as coaches. In 2019, TV Azteca acquired rights of the show and changed the name to La Voz.
- (Romania) Pro TV — On 28 September 2011, the Romanian version of the show, Vocea României, started to broadcast on Pro TV.
- (Turkey) Show TV — On 10 October 2011, the Turkish version of the show, called O Ses Türkiye, started to broadcast on Show TV. In later seasons, the same programme will be broadcast instead by Star TV and TV8 from season 2 and 4, respectively.
- Nine Network/Seven Network — On 29 May 2011, it was announced that Australia's Nine Network would broadcast the Australian version of the show, The Voice, in late 2011. However, two months later, they reported that the show will be postponed to air until the early 2012, and that Nine Network are in talks with signing at least one international artist to lead its panel of coaches on the show. The first series premiered on 15 April 2012 featuring Delta Goodrem, Joel Madden, Seal and Keith Urban as the coaches. In 2021, the show moved to the Seven Network
- (Republic of Ireland) RTÉ One — On 8 January 2012, RTÉ One started airing the Irish version of the show, The Voice of Ireland.
- (Canada) TVA — On 20 January 2013, TVA began airing the Canadian French version of the show, La Voix coached by Marc Dupré, Marie-Mai, Ariane Moffatt and Jean-Pierre Ferland.
- (France) TF1 — On 25 February 2012, TF1 aired the French version of the show, The Voice: la plus belle voix. The coaches were Florent Pagny, Jenifer, Louis Bertignac, and Garou.
- Zhejiang Television — The Chinese version, The Voice of China started in July 2012. On 13 July 2012, season 1 started airing on Zhejiang Television with Yang Kun, Na Ying, Liu Huan and Harlem Yu as coaches, Hua Shao was the host. On 12 July 2013, season 2 started airing on Zhejiang Television with Wang Feng, Zhang Hui-mei, Na Ying and Harlem Yu as coaches, Hua Shao was the host.
- VTV — The Vietnamese version of the show, The Voice of Vietnam, debuted on 8 July 2012, with Thu Minh, Trần Lập, Hồ Ngọc Hà and Đàm Vĩnh Hưng as coaches.
- (Brazil) Globo – In September 2012, Globo started airing the Brazilian version of The Voice, "The Voice Brasil", hosted by Tiago Leifert and with coaches Claudia Leitte, Carlinhos Brown, Daniel and Lulu Santos.
- Caracol Televisión — On 1 October 2012, the Colombian version of the show, La Voz Colombia started airing on Caracol Televisión with Carlos Vives, Fanny Lu, Ricardo Montaner and Andrés Cepeda as coaches. Carlos Ponce is the host and Linda Palma is the social media correspondent.
- (Russia) Channel One — On 5 October 2012, the Russian version of the show, Голос aired on Channel One. The coaches were Pelageya, Dima Bilan, Alexander Gradsky, and Leonid Agutin. The host until the 10th season was Dmitry Nagiyev. From the 11th season, the host was Yana Churikova.
- Indosiar — On 10 February 2013, the Indonesian version of the show, The Voice Indonesia, started airing on Indosiar starting from season 1 with Glenn Fredly, Armand Maulana, Giring Ganesha and Sherina Munaf as the coaches. Darius Sinathrya is the host. On 26 February 2016, season 2 started airing on RCTI with Ari Lasso, Agnez Mo, Kaka Satriaji and Judika as coaches, Daniel Mananta is the host. In 2018, the show moved to GTV since season 3 with Anggun, Armand Maulana, Titi DJ, and duo coaches Vidi Aldiano-Nino Kayam as the coaches, Ananda Omesh and Astrid Tiar is the hosts. All coaches and hosts returned again in season 4 in the same channel except Anggun that changed by Isyana Sarasvati and Astrid Tiar that changed by Gracia Indri.
- ABS-CBN — On 15 June 2013, ABS-CBN aired the Philippine version of the show, The Voice of the Philippines. The show is hosted by Toni Gonzaga with Robi Domingo and Alex Gonzaga as the show's V-Reporters; while Sarah Geronimo, Bamboo Mañalac, Lea Salonga and apl.de.ap as the coaches.
- ANT1 – SKAI – Sigma (Cyprus) — The Voice of Greece is the Greek and Cypriot version of the show that premiered on 10 January 2014 on ANT1 (Cyprus and Greece). From 2017, the show is displayed on the television channel "Skai" (Greece) and "Sigma" (Cyprus)
- (Peru) Frecuencia Latina — La Voz Perú In 2013, Frecuencia Latina aired the Peruvian version of the show, La Voz Perú. The show is hosted by Christian Rivero; while Eva Ayllón, Gian Marco, Luis Enrique and Álex Lora as the coaches.
- &TV -The Voice India In 2015, &TV started to air Indian version of The Voice India with Endemol India producing the show. The auditions for the series was shot in March 2015, and it premiered on 6 June 2015 with the show hosted by Karan Tacker whilst leading Bollywood singers Himesh Reshammiya, Mika Singh, Shaan and Sunidhi Chauhan featuring as the coaches.
- AzTV — On 13 November 2015, AzTV launched The Voice of Azerbaijan, the Azerbaijani version of the show. The judges of the first season (2015–2016) are Mubariz Taghiyev, Faiq Aghayev, Tunzale Aghayeva and Manana Japaridze.
- (Iceland) SkjárEinn — On 2 October 2015 the first season of 'The Voice Ísland' aired on 'SkjárEinn'. The coaches of the first season (2015–2016) were Helgi Björnsson, Salka Sól Eyfeld, Unnsteinn Stefánsson and Svala Björgvinsdóttir. A second season is planned for 2016–2017.
- Canal 13 — On 31 May 2015 the first season of The Voice Chile aired on Canal 13. IT was presented by Sergio Lagos and the judges of the first season (2015) were Nicole, Álvaro López, Luis Fonsi and Franco Simone. After the season finale, Franco Simone went on saying that the production went against him and his teammates to favour the other coaches. For the second season (2016) Simone was replaced by Ana Torroja.
- (United States) Telemundo — On 10 May 2018, Telemundo announced that they would premiere the Spanish-language version of NBC's singing competition The Voice in 2019, called La Voz, with Luis Fonsi tapped as the first coach, followed by Alejandra Guzmán and Wisin in July. Carlos Vives got announced as the last and final coach in September. The show’s first season was hosted by Jorge Bernal, Jacqueline Bracamontes and Jessica Cediél.
- (Mongolia) Mongol TV — On 21 January 2018, the Mongolian version of the show debuted on Mongol TV.
- (Nepal) Kantipur HD — On 25 August 2018, the Nepali version of the show aired on Kantipur HD, with Deep Shrestha, Sanup Poudel, Abhaya Subba and Pramod Kharel as coaches.
- (Wales) S4C — In 2025, the Welsh version of the show (dubbed Y Llais) premiered on S4C, with Sir Bryn Terfel, Bronwen Lewis, Aleighcia Scott and Ywain Gwynedd as the original coaches.

== Television ratings ==
In 2013, the show was one of the highest rated shows on Dutch television, with weekly ratings varying between 1.6 and 3.0 million viewers. Its first-season finale, which aired on 21 January 2011, was viewed by 3.75 million. The second season's first episode was viewed by almost 3.3 million.

== 2022 sexual misconduct scandal ==
=== Allegations ===
On 15 January 2022, broadcaster RTL announced that the then-ongoing twelfth season of The Voice of Holland would be put on hold indefinitely after the second episode. They had received concerning questions from journalist Tim Hofman about certain crew members regarding allegations of abuse of power and sexual misconduct.

Soon after RTL's announcement, band leader of The Voice of Holland, Jeroen Rietbergen (brother-in-law of creator and media tycoon John de Mol), issued a statement admitting to years of sexual misbehaviour. According to Dutch newspaper Algemeen Dagblad, he had promised contestants that he would make sure they’d advance to the next round in exchange for sexual activities. Producer Talpa Media, now ITV Studios, had known about his sexual misbehaviour years ago and reprimanded him, but allowed him to remain as band leader of the show.

=== Official reports and consequences ===
Later that afternoon, Dutch police confirmed that a victim had filed an official report against Ali B. The rapper had been a coach on The Voice for nine seasons. Ali B, however, denied all allegations.

Head sponsor T-Mobile, as well as other sponsors, decided to stop supporting the show.

Anouk, one of the many coaches and hosts to comment on the matter, stated that she had wanted to wait until she had seen the BOOS episode, but after reading Rietbergen's statement, as well as holding several telephone calls with other affected individuals, she had decided not to return as coach on the show.

On 19 January 2022, right after the news that a second victim had filed an official report against Ali B, broadcaster RTL announced that they would suspend their collaboration with him during the investigations. The Dutch police also announced that another victim came forward and filed an official report against Rietbergen.

Tim Hofman and his broadcaster BNNVARA announced that more crew members would be mentioned in Hofman's YouTube show BOOS. The news sparked a heated debate in the Netherlands about the abuse of power by people in the entertainment industry, especially as there had already been accusations against singer Marco Borsato, including an official report of sexual misconduct with a minor. Borsato was a coach on The Voice between 2011 and 2016, and on The Voice Kids between 2012 and 2020.

=== "BOOS: This is The Voice" and aftermath ===
On 20 January 2022, Hofman's weekly YouTube show BOOS aired an episode bringing the scandal to light, titled "BOOS: This is The Voice". The first part of the documentary revealed more allegations of sexual misconduct on The Voice, including allegations of rape. The alleged sex offenders are band leader Rietbergen, former coach Borsato, coach Ali B and a yet to remain anonymous director of The Voice of Holland and The Voice Kids. The episode ended with Hofman interviewing De Mol, who had just finished watching the first part of the episode.

After the episode went online, reactions poured in. De Mol was accused of victim-blaming, particularly by his company's female employees. A page-wide advertisement published on Algemeen Dagblad stated the following: "Dear John, It’s not the women. Greetings, the women in your company."

The New York Times cited the scandal as an example of how the Dutch approach to sexual permissiveness can sideline discussions of consent and misconduct.

Following the publication of "BOOS: This is The Voice", several Dutch radio stations announced that they would no longer play music by Ali B and Borsato for the time being, and Madame Tussauds Amsterdam removed Borsato's wax figure from the collection. The Flemish TV channel VTM cancelled a planned episode of the Netflix series Sergio Over the Border with Borsato. Publishing house Maven Publishing stopped selling the book The Ali B Method recently launched by Ali B, and Mocro Flavour, an Ali B-affiliated product line of meat substitutes, was cancelled.

The Voice of Holland's social media pages were largely taken offline. After the official reports of sexual misconduct against Rietbergen, Borsato and Ali B, two official reports were also filed against the anonymous director of The Voice.

In the days following publication, several aid agencies for victims of sexual violence reported a significant increase in the number of requests for help. In addition, the demand for confidential counselors within companies increased, and it prompted self-reflection in various organizations on how the social protection schemes for employees was assured within their company. Making confidential counselors within companies mandatory was something that the Dutch government had been looking into for some time.

On 21 January 2022, human rights organization Amnesty International stated that the sexual misconduct scandal on The Voice of Holland showed that the process of legalizing sexual consent laws must be sped up. Many of the cases described in the documentary concern involuntary sex and imbalanced power relations, which are not always punishable by current law. Dutch Minister of Justice Dilan Yeşilgöz stated that the implementation of a new Sexual Crimes Act would be accelerated.

On 29 January 2022, a protest was held in Amsterdam for the accelerated implementation of the sexual consent law.

=== Return in 2026 ===
On 31 March 2025, producers RTL and ITV Studios Netherlands announced that The Voice of Holland (as well as The Voice Kids) would return in 2026, after a 4-year hiatus, with new regulations regarding the wellbeing and security of the contestants, such as a requirement for the coaches not being alone with one of their contestants.

== See also ==
- Netherlands' The Voice Kids
- Netherlands' The Voice Senior
