= The Voice of Holland season 12 =

Dutch reality singing competition

The Voice of Holland
- Season 12
- Hosted by: Martijn Krabbé; Chantal Janzen; Geraldine Kemper (backstage)
- Coaches: Anouk; Waylon; Ali B Glennis Grace; Typhoon & Maan de Steenwinkel (comeback stage)

Release
- Original network: RTL 4
- Original release: 7 January – 14 January 2022

The twelfth season of the Dutch reality singing competition The Voice of Holland premiered on 7 January 2022 on RTL 4. Host Martijn Krabbé, Chantal Janzen, as well as backstage host Geraldine Kemper, as well as the three coaches from the previous season, Waylon, Ali B and Anouk all returned, while Jan Smit was replaced by Glennis Grace. Jamai Loman returned as backstage host after a two-season hiatus.

This season marks the first time in the show's history to feature a fifth coach, Typhoon and season 6 winner Maan de Steenwinkel, who selected participants to participate in the Comeback stage. Also, this season marks the introduction of the block button, as first introduced in the fourteenth season of the American version. In addition to the familiar button for his chair, each coach gets three smaller buttons with the names of the other coaches on it. If someone presses the block button, the coach who has been pressed can no longer claim the talent. However, the blocked coach only sees this when he tries to turn around himself. To ensure that the coaches cannot block each other indefinitely, they can only use their block button once in the entire blind audition.

On 15 January 2022, after two episodes aired, the season was put on hold due to power abuse and sexual misconduct allegations against crew members of the show. Jeroen Rietbergen, band leader of The Voice, made a statement acknowledging sexual misconduct, apologised and resigned. The following day, one of the four coaches, Anouk, announced that after reading Rietbergen's statement, as well as several telephone calls, she had made up her mind and would not return to the show. Days later, coach Ali B was suspended from RTL due to the investigations. On 31 March 2025, a new thirteenth season was announced to premiere in January 2026, effectively ending the twelfth season prematurely.

== Teams ==
Color key

– Winner
– Runner-up
– Third place
– Fourth place
– Eliminated in the Live Shows

– Eliminated in the Knockout Rounds
– Artist was stolen by another coach (name is struckthrough)
– Artist was stolen but was later switched with another artist and got eliminated
– Eliminated in the Battle Rounds

Coaches	Top Artists				
Ali B					
Ali B	Niene Malon	Stacey Saturnino	Muriel Blijd	Jules Avery	
Anouk					
Anouk	Danniel Drullard Hernandez	Pascale Julia Kuiper	David Dam	Cheyenne Latul	Wouter Vos
Glennis Grace					
Glennis Grace	Stevie Stunner	Francien van der Burg	Jefferson Manson	Sharon de Bos	
Waylon					
Waylon	Simon Roberts	Ray Benjamin	Gonçalo Santos	Jeffrey Schenk	
Typhoon & Maan					
Typhoon & Maan	Pam Osher				
Note: Italicized names are stolen contestants (names struck through within former teams).

== Blind Auditions ==
The blind auditions premiered on 7 January 2022. A new feature within the Blind Auditions this season is the Block, which each coach can use once to prevent one of the other coaches from getting a contestant.

Color key

✔	Coach pressed "I WANT YOU" button
	Artist defaulted to a coach's team
	Artist elected a coach's team
	Artist was eliminated, but got a second chance to compete in "Comeback Stage"
	Artist was eliminated and was not invited back for "Comeback Stage"
✘	Coach pressed "I WANT YOU" button, but was blocked by another coach from getting the artist
	Blocked by Ali B; Blocked by Anouk; Blocked by Glennis; Blocked by Waylon

=== Episode 1 (7 January) ===
Order	Artist	Age	Song	Coaches' and contestants' choices			
Order	Artist	Age	Song	Ali B	Anouk	Glennis	Waylon
1	Danniel Drullard Hernandez	25	"Never Enough"	✔	✔	✔	✔
2	Stevie Stunner	33	"Diamonds"	✔	—	✔	—
3	Ferry Doldersum	35	”Come As You Are”	—	—	—	—
4	Ray Benjamin	23	"Jij Bent Het Leven Voor Mij"	—	✔	—	✔
5	Stacey Saturnino	30	"All I Could Do Was Cry"	✔	—	✘	—
6	Pam Osher	40	”Signed, Sealed, Delivered I'm Yours”	—	—	—	—
7	Pascale Julia Kuiper	17	"Voilà"	✔	✔	✔	✔
8	Niene Malon	23	"Dangerous Woman"	✔	—	—	—
9	Francien van der Burg	27	"Zeg Me Wie Je Ziet"	✔	—	✔	✔
10	Jeannine La Rose	41	"Honesty"	—	—	—	—
11	Simon Roberts	35	"Tennessee Whiskey"	✔	✔	✔	✔

=== Episode 2 (14 January) ===
Order	Artist	Age	Song	Coaches' and contestants' choices			
Order	Artist	Age	Song	Ali B	Anouk	Glennis	Waylon
1	David Dam	27	"Iris"	✔	✔	✔	✔
2	Muriel Blijd	56	"Run To You"	✔	—	—	—
3	Cheyenne Latul	21	"Hallucinate"	—	✔	—	✔
4	Jules Avery	25	"Creep"	✔	—	—	—
5	Wouter Vos	28	"Power Over Me"	✔	✔	✔	✔
6	Sharon de Bos	28	"When I Was Your Man"	✔	—	✔	—
7	Gonçalo Santos	26	"Nervous"	✔	—	✔	✔
8	Femcy	35	"Get Here"	—	—	—	—
9	Jeffrey Schenk	39	"Hart Van Mijn Gevoel"	✔	—	✔	✔
10	Tina Iliria	21	"Elastic Heart"	—	—	—	—
11	Jefferson Manson	22	"Officer Don't Let Go (original song)"	✔	✘	✔	✔
