= Typhoon (rapper) =

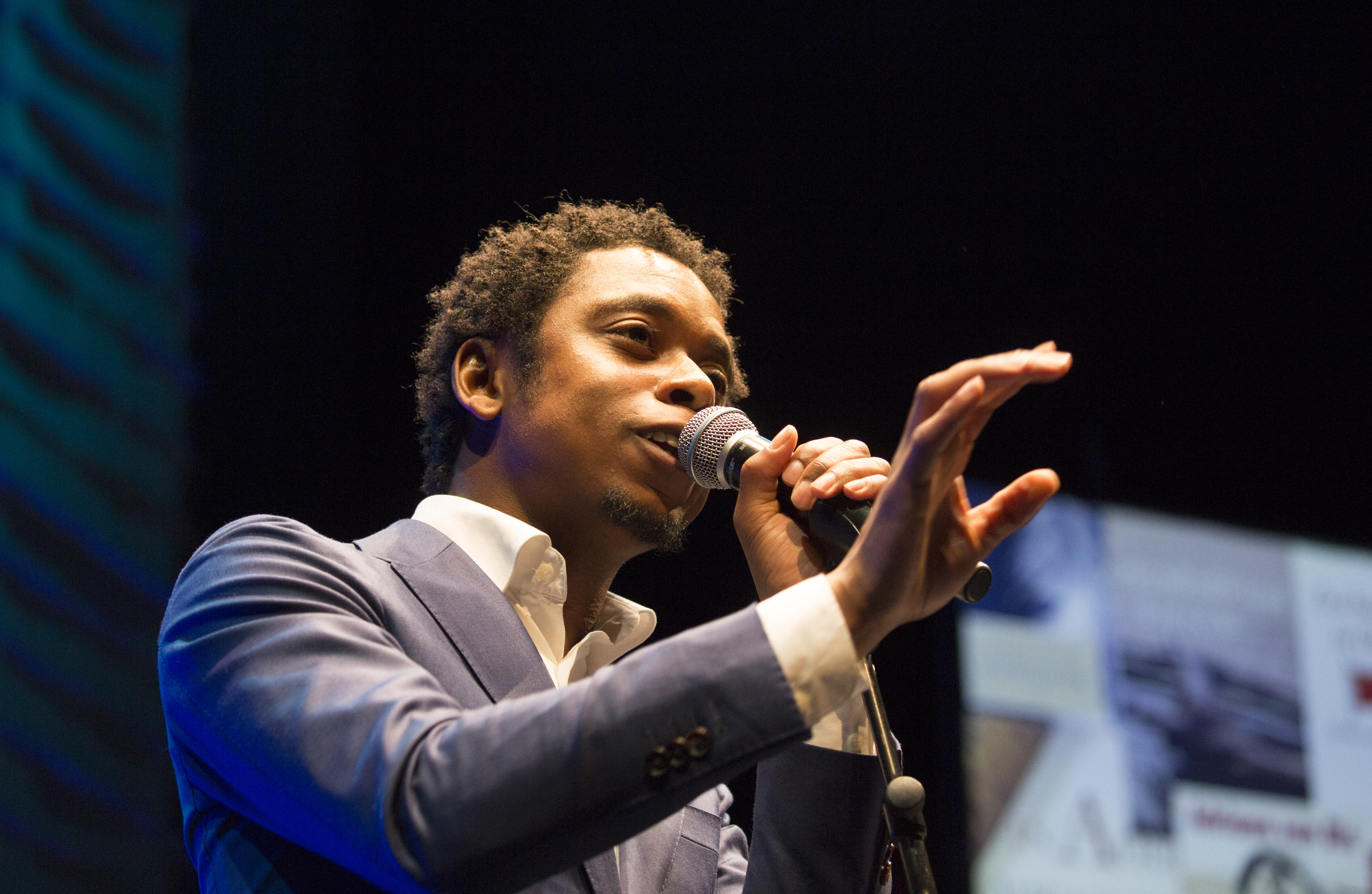
- Typhoon in 2016

Background information
- Born: Glenn de Randamie; 6 August 1984 (age 42) 't Harde, Netherlands
- Genre: Hip hop
- Occupations: Rapper, singer
- Instrument: Vocals
- Years active: 2000–present
- Label: TopNotch

Glenn de Randamie (born 6 August 1984), better known by his stage name Typhoon, is a Dutch rapper. He is signed to Dutch hip-hop record label Top Notch.

== Biography ==
Typhoon was born and raised in the Dutch town of 't Harde. Inspired by his brother Blaxtar, Typhoon started writing at the age of 12 and as a rap artist with the group Rudeteenz, which he joined in when he was 15. It consisted of him, Blaxtar and the well-known Dutch hip-hop formation Opgezwolle. He made some guest appearances for Opgezwolle before winning Grote Prijs, the biggest hip-hop prize in the Netherlands. In the same year he got his VWO diploma at Carolus Clusius College in Zwolle.

After winning Grote Prijs, Typhoon signed to the record label Top Notch. He started making separate thematic songs for a Dutch music channel called "The Box" with the producer Nav. The themes varied from religion and sexism to money and sex. In 2006 he started working on his solo debut Tussen Licht en Lucht which was released the next year. In 2009 he formed the group Fakkelbrigade with Dutch rappers Rico and Sticks (from Opgezwolle) and ART. Later that year he received the Zilveren Harp, a Dutch prize for upcoming artists. Typhoon also went to Kenya for development aid with the organization Edukans. In 2010 he brought out an eight track EP called Chocolade with the New Cool Collective.

In 2014, Typhoon released his second solo-album to critical acclaim; Lobi da Basi (Surinamese for Love rules) made him a festival-favourite with both hip-hop and pop-audiences.

In 2016, Typhoon was in the news after being pulled over. The reason this became a news topic was because the police officer considered it suspicious for a person of color to drive the expensive car he was driving.

In 2019, Typhoon announced that he was working on a new album. The album, titled Lichthuis was released in 2020.

== Discography ==
=== Albums ===
- 2007: Tussen Licht en Lucht (peaked on NED No. 24 on Album Top 100)
- 2014: Lobi Da Basi
- 2020: Lichthuis

== DVDs ==
- "Buitenwesten" (with Opgezwolle, Jawat!, Kubus & DuvelDuvel)

== Prizes ==
Jaar	Prijs	Categorie	Muziek	
2004	Grote Prijs van Nederland	HipHop		winner
2007	Gouden Greep	Best Live Act		nom
2007	Gouden Greep	Best Artist National		winner
2007	Gouden Greep	Best Album	Tussen licht en lucht	nom
2007	Urban Awards	Beste Album	Tussen licht en lucht	nom
2007	Urban Awards	Best Lyrics	Volle maan	winner
2007	3VOOR12 Awards	Best Album	Tussen licht en lucht	nom
2007	Essent Awards			winner
2008	Zilveren Harp			winner
2008	State Awards 2008	Best Live Act		nom
2008	Kosmospolis Hero Awards	Most Cutting-Edge; Dutch Music Video	Sprokkeldagen	nom
2009	State Awards 2009	Lijn5 Award	Binnenvetter remix	nom
2010	State Awards 2010	Best Live Act		nom
2014	Overijsselse Cultuurprijs	Talent		winner
2014	Radio 6 Soul & Jazz Awards	Best Single	Hemel valt	nom
2014	Radio 6 Soul & Jazz Awards	Best Live Act		winner
2014	3VOOR12 Awards	Best Album	Lobi da Basi	winner
2015	Edisons	Best Album	Lobi da Basi	win
2015	Edisons	Best Hiphop	Lobi da Basi	winner
2015	FunX Awards	Best MC		nom
2015	FunX Awards	Best Album	Lobi da Basi	nom
2015	3FM Awards	Best Album	Lobi da Basi	nom
2015	3FM Awards	Best Hiphop		winner
2015	3FM Awards	Best Live Act		nom
2016	3FM Awards	Best Hiphop		winner
2017	Edisons	Best Videoclip	Wij Zijn Er	winner
2017	Dr. J.P. van Praag-prijs	Humanistisch Verbond	Mag het Licht Aan Festival	winner
