= List of Dutch Top 40 number-one singles of 2005 =

These hits topped the Dutch Top 40 in 2005 (see 2005 in music).

Issue date	Song	Artist(s)
January 1	"Bigger Than That"	Men2B
January 8	"Plaything"	Raffish
January 15	"Als je iets kan doen"	Artiesten voor Azië
January 22	"Als je iets kan doen"	Artiesten voor Azië
January 29	"Als je iets kan doen"	Artiesten voor Azië
February 5	"Als je iets kan doen"	Artiesten voor Azië
February 12	"Schnappi, das kleine Krokodil"	Schnappi
February 19	"Schnappi, das kleine Krokodil"	Schnappi
February 26	"Schnappi, das kleine Krokodil"	Schnappi
March 5	"Schnappi, das kleine Krokodil"	Schnappi
March 12	"One, Two, Three"	Ch!pz
March 19	"One, Two, Three"	Ch!pz
March 26	"One, Two, Three"	Ch!pz
April 2	"Let Me Love You"	Mario
April 9	"Geef mij je angst" ("Give Me Your Fear")	Guus Meeuwis
April 16	"Geef mij je angst" ("Give Me Your Fear")	Guus Meeuwis
April 23	"Geef mij je angst" ("Give Me Your Fear")	Guus Meeuwis
April 30	"Geef mij je angst" ("Give Me Your Fear")	Guus Meeuwis
May 7	"Something to Say"	Kane
May 14	"Something to Say"	Kane
May 21	"Geef mij je angst" ("Give Me Your Fear")	Guus Meeuwis
May 28	"Geef mij je angst" ("Give Me Your Fear")	Guus Meeuwis
June 4	"Geef mij je angst" ("Give Me Your Fear")	Guus Meeuwis
June 11	"Watskeburt"	De Jeugd van Tegenwoordig
June 18	"Watskeburt"	De Jeugd van Tegenwoordig
June 25	"Watskeburt"	De Jeugd van Tegenwoordig
July 2	"Lonely"	Akon
July 9	"Lonely"	Akon
July 16	"Lonely"	Akon
July 23	"Lonely"	Akon
July 30	"Lonely"	Akon
August 6	"Fearless"	Kane
August 13	"Fearless"	Kane
August 20	"Fearless"	Kane
August 27	"Carnival"	Ch!pz
September 3	"Carnival"	Ch!pz
September 10	"You're Beautiful"	James Blunt
September 17	"You're Beautiful"	James Blunt
September 24	"You're Beautiful"	James Blunt
October 1	"You're Beautiful"	James Blunt
October 8	"Het land van..."	Lange Frans & Baas B
October 15	"Het land van..."	Lange Frans & Baas B
October 22	"Tripping"	Robbie Williams
October 29	"Tripping"	Robbie Williams
November 5	"Tripping"	Robbie Williams
November 12	"Hung Up"	Madonna
November 19	"Hung Up"	Madonna
November 26	"Hung Up"	Madonna
December 3	"Hung Up"	Madonna
December 10	"Hung Up"	Madonna
December 17	"Hung Up"	Madonna
December 24	"Hung Up"	Madonna
December 31	"Talk"	Coldplay

== Number-one artists ==
Position	Artist	Weeks #1
1	Guus Meeuwis	7
1	Madonna	7
2	Akon	5
2	Ch!pz	5
2	Kane	5
3	Artiesten voor Azië	4
3	James Blunt	4
3	Schnappi	4
4	Green Day	3
4	De Jeugd van Tegenwoordig	3
5	Lange Frans & Baas B	2
6	Coldplay	1
6	Mario	1
6	Men2B	1
6	Raffish	1

== See also ==
- 2005 in music
