= Yamaha =

Yamaha may refer to:

== People ==
- Torakusu Yamaha, a Japanese businessman and founder of the Yamaha Corporation
- Fatima Yamaha, an alias of dutch musical artist Bas Bron

== Companies ==
- Yamaha Corporation, a Japanese musical instrument and audio equipment manufacturer
  - Yamaha Music Foundation, an organization established by Yamaha Corporation
  - Yamaha Pro Audio, a Yamaha division specializing in products for the professional audio market
- Yamaha Motor Company, a Japanese mobility manufacturer, spun off from Yamaha Corporation
  - Yamaha Motor Racing, the MotoGP factory team of Yamaha Motor Company

== Events ==
- Yamaha Popular Song Contest, a music contest held from 1969 to 1986
- Yamaha Music Festival, or World Popular Song Festival, an international song contest held from 1970 to 1989

== Other uses ==
- Shizuoka Blue Revs, formerly Yamaha Júbilo, a Japanese rugby team
- Yamaha Stadium, a football stadium located in Iwata, Shizuoka Prefecture
