= Willie Wartaal =

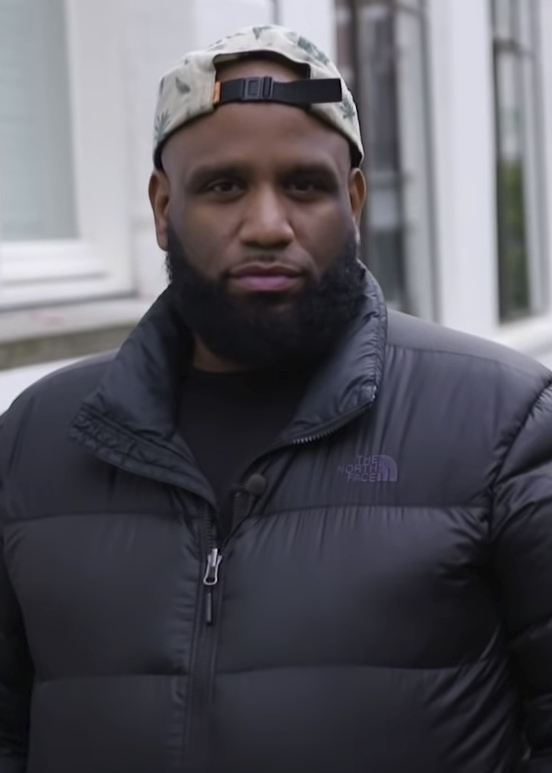
- Wartaal in 2019

Background information
- Born: 30 May 1982 (age 44)
- Origin: Poortvliet, Netherlands
- Genres: Rap, hip hop, nederhop
- Occupations: Rapper, actor, television personality
- Instruments: Vocals
- Labels: TopNotch, Magnetron Music

Olivier Mitshell Locadia (born 30 May 1982), known as Willie Wartaal or Wiwa, is a Dutch rapper, actor and television personality. Locadia is widely known as a member of the hip hop and R&B group De Jeugd van Tegenwoordig. As a solo artist, he has hits in collaboration with other artists with "Dom, Lomp & Famous", "Konijntje", and "Wat wil je doen dan?!?". In both De Jeugd van Tegenwoordig and his solo career, Locadia is recognised for his wordplay and eccentric lyrical approach.

== Early life ==
Locadia was born in Poortvliet to parents from Curaçao. He grew up in Amsterdam with his drug-addicted mother, along with his brother and sister. After his education, he moved in with his sister in Portugal for three years. Upon returning to the Netherlands in 2005, he joined the rap formation De Jeugd van Tegenwoordig through his friend Alfred Tratlehner (Vieze Fur), which then became famous in one fell swoop by the number 1 hit "Watskeburt?!".

== Career ==
=== De Jeugd van Tegenwoordig ===
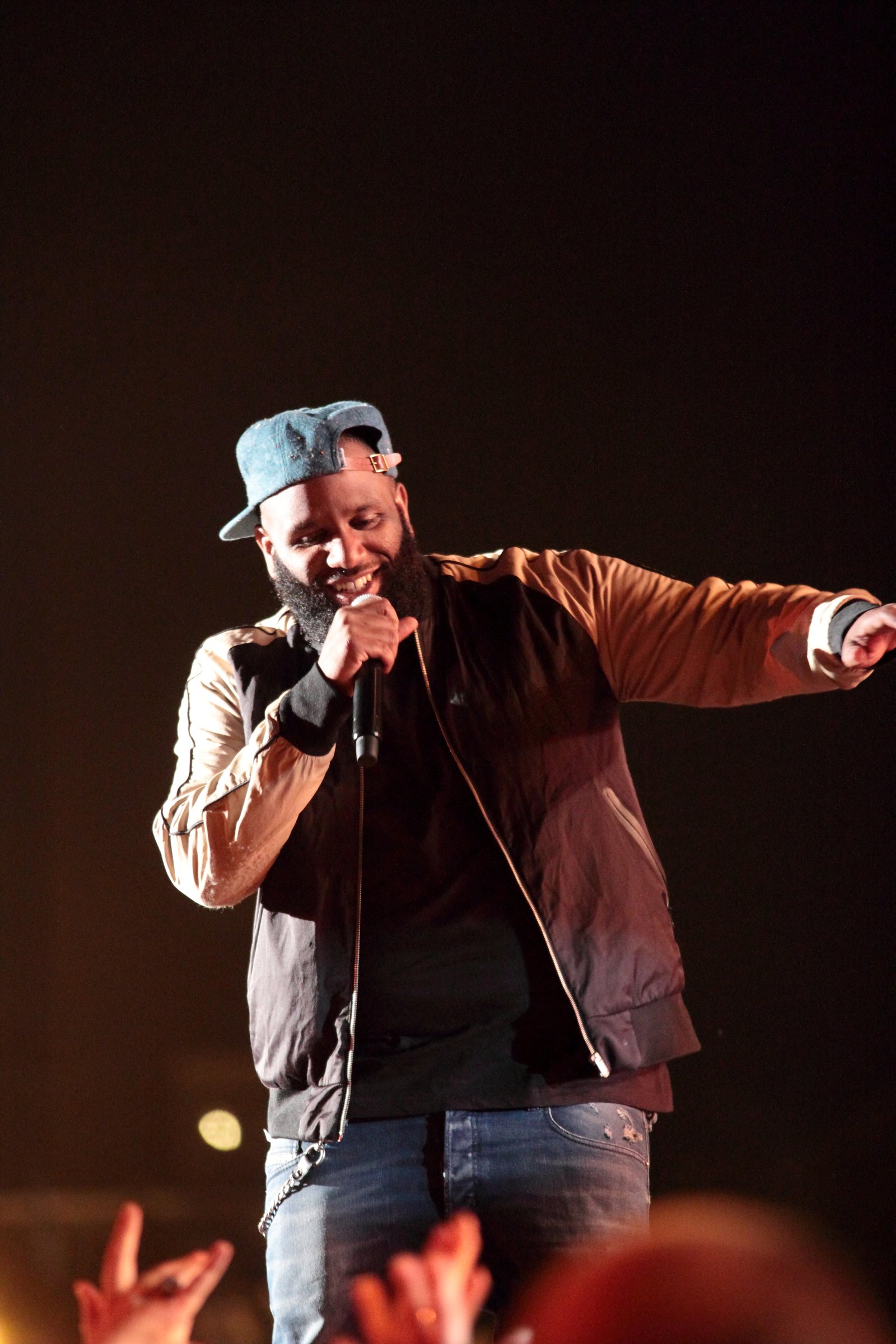
Wartaal performing with De Jeugd van Tegenwoordig in 2015

In 2005, Locadia joined De Jeugd van Tegenwoordig as a rapper and lyricist. Together with the band members Vieze Fur, Pepijn Lanen (Faberyayo) and producer Bas Bron (De Neger Des Heils), the group would have large success. Rapping under the pseudonym Willie Wartaal, Locadia has performed with the band on the large stages in the Netherlands, Flanders, Germany, and England. Characterized by an original style consisting of beats with strong influences from electronic music and the absurd lyrics, the eccentric musicians won various music awards and nominations and performed in sold-out halls.

With the release of the debut album Parels voor de zwijnen, they definitively established their name in the Dutch music world in 2005. With the albums De Machine (2008), De lachende derde (2010), “Ja, Natúúrlijk!” (2013), and Manon (2015).

=== Solo career ===
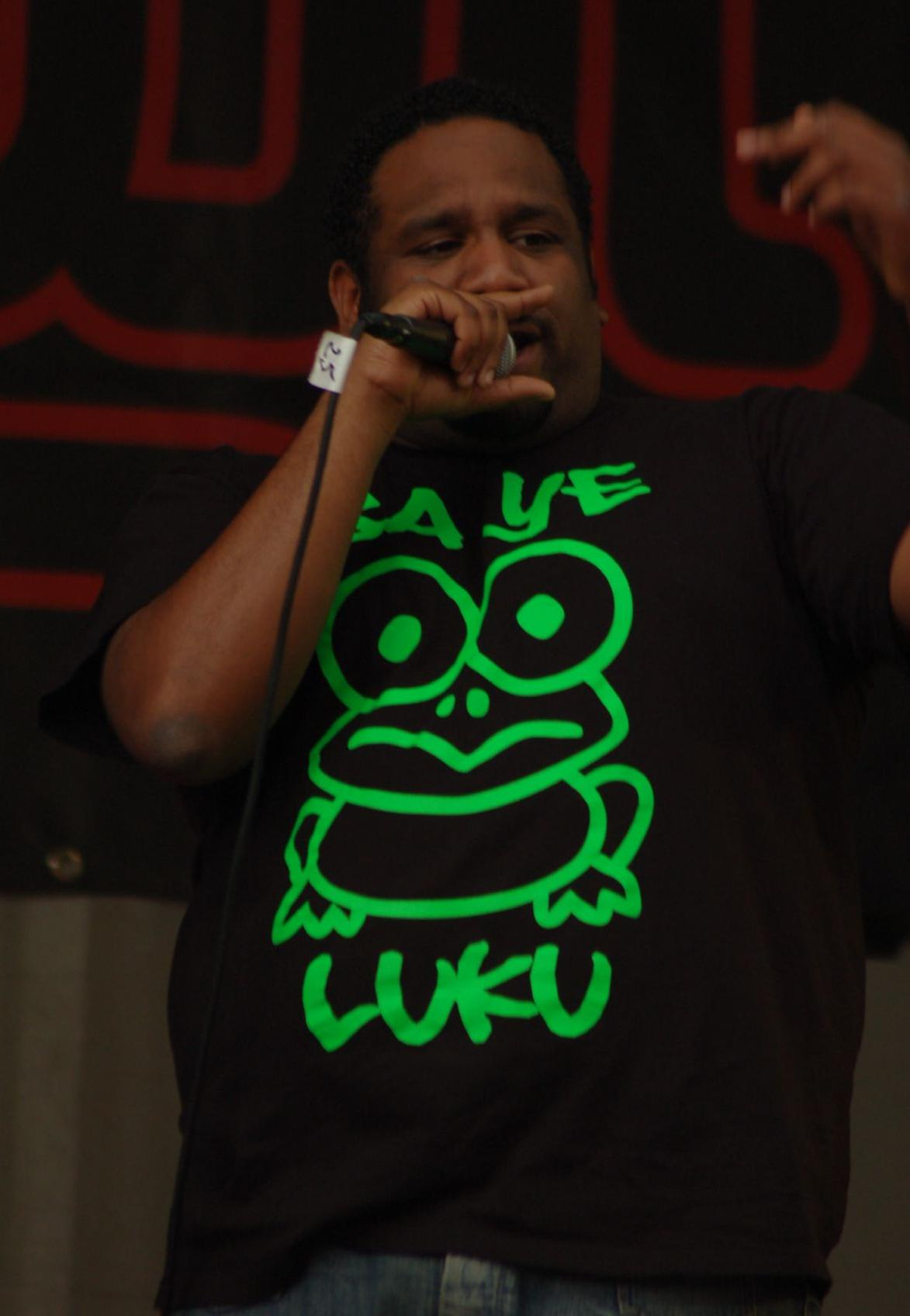
Wartaal performing in 2011

In 2006, Willie Wartaal began his solo career, while continuing to work with De Jeugd van Tegenwoordig. The first step in his solo career was the single "Wat wil je doen dan?!?" in 2005, a hit in the Dutch Top 40. This song was made in collaboration with SpaceKees, The Opposites, and The Partysquad, among others. The single also was the promotional single for the film Schnitzel Paradise. After this success, Wartaal continued to be in contact with The Opposites and contributed to the Vuur Mixtape in 2005 and accompanied the rap duo in their video clip Slaap. In 2007, the rappers continued to work together and the song "Dom, Lomp & Famous" was released together with rapper Dio. This song was positively received by the audience and achieved a high position in the charts.

At the end of 2007, Wartaal collaborated with dance producer Arjuna Schiks. Under the group name aka The Junkies, they released a song entitled "Konijntje". The single achieved notoriety in the Netherlands, along with success in the Flemish Ultratop 50 and came in third place. The hit was lauded for its unique composition and unconventional tempo changes.

In 2019, Willie Wartaal released his first album Enkel Bangers, with the song "Daia" as the first single.

On January 24, 2023, he indicated in De Avondshow with Arjen Lubach that he would begin using the name Wiwa in his professional career. He also performed the theater performance "Moederdag".

=== Television career ===
Locadia has presented programs for the music channel The Box. At the end of 2006, he presented a series of talk shows for BNN under the name Wartaal. Locadia can also be seen as a guest on various television programs, such as in 2007 as a participant in the BNN program "Get Smarter in a Week". From September 23, 2007, he presented the children's program Villa Life together with Horace Cohen. From March 2008, Locadia was featured in the BNN program Crazy 88.

In 2012, Locadia participated in the survival program Expeditie Robinson. He was the first out in the program. He also presented an eight-part series for the VPRO in 2012: Zapp echt gebeurd.

Since 2020, Locadia, together with Amber Delil, has been presenting the program Statements for the radio station SLAM! on YouTube.

In 2026, he became a coach on the thirteenth season of The Voice of Holland alongside Ilse DeLange, Suzan & Freek, and Dinand Woesthoff.

== Discography ==
=== With De Jeugd van Tegenwoordig ===
==== Albums ====
Year	Title
2005	Parels Voor De Zwijnen
2008	De Machine
2010	De Lachende Derde
2013	Ja, Natúúrlijk!
2015	Manon
2018	Luek
2018	Anders (Different)
2023	Moderne Manieren

==== Singles ====
Year	Single	Album	Peak Position		
Year	Single	Album	Dutch Top 40	Dutch Top 100	Flemish Ultratop
2005	"Watskeburt?!"	Parels Voor De Zwijnen	1	1	15
2005	"Voorjekijkendoorlopen"	Parels Voor De Zwijnen	-	40	-
2005	"Ho Ho Ho" (ft. Katja Schuurman)	-	32	25	-
2006	"Poes in de Playboy" (with Luie Hond)	Met Liefde	-	41	-
2007	"Shenkie"	-	-	43	-
2008	"Hollereer"	De Machine	-	11	36
2008	"Wopwopwop (De Tentbakkers)"	De Machine	-	-	-
2008	"Datvindjeleukhe"	De Machine	-	-	-
2009	"Buma In Mijn Zak"	De Machine	-	-	-
2009	"Deze Donkere Jongen komt zo Hard"	De Machine	-	-	35
2010	"Sterrenstof"	De Lachende Derde	8*	7*	-

=== Solo ===
==== Singles ====
- 2005: "Wat wil je doen dan?!?" – (with The Partysquad, SpaceKees, The Opposites
- 2007: "Dom, Lomp & Famous" – (with The Opposites & Dio)
- 2008: "Konijntje" – as aka The Junkies (with Arjuna Schiks)
- 2019: "Daia"
- 2020: "Mootje"
- 2020: "Partij Voor De Schapen"
- 2021: "Ey Gap" – (ft. Donnie)
- 2022: "Sutu"
- 2023: "Sexy" – (with Lyente)
- 2023: "A Niffski"
- 2025: "Opvrolijken"
- 2025: "iK bEpAaL"
- 2025: "NEP"
- 2025: Chicken Wings (Appen) – (ft. Anne-Fay)
- Repeat (remix) – (with De Sluwe Vos, Rico & Deveraux)
