= Dinand Woesthoff =

Dutch singer (born 1972)

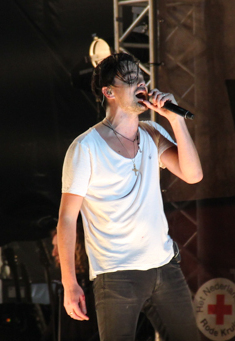
- Woesthoff performing with Kane in 2012

Background information
- Born: 6 September 1972 (age 53)
- Origin: Gorinchem, Netherlands
- Genres: Rock; alternative rock; pop rock
- Occupation: Singer
- Instrument: Vocals
- Formerly of: Kane
- Spouse(s): Guusje Nederhorst (m. 2003; died 2004) Lucy Hopkins (m. 2009)

Marco Frank Ferdinand "Dinand" Woesthoff (born 6 September 1972) is a Dutch singer. He was formerly the lead vocalist of the rock band Kane, which he formed in 1998 with Dennis van Leeuwen, and which was active until 2014 and again from 2023 until 2025. The band is noted for having achieved multiple number-one singles on the Dutch Top 40 and albums on the Dutch Albums Chart. In addition to his musical career, Woesthoff is known as an animal rights activist, and he appeared as a list candidate for the Party for the Animals in the 2017 Dutch general election.

== Early life ==
Woesthoff was born in Gorinchem on 6 September 1972. He was educated at Merewade College. His father is Indonesian, his mother Dutch, and he has one sister.

== Career ==
=== Kane ===
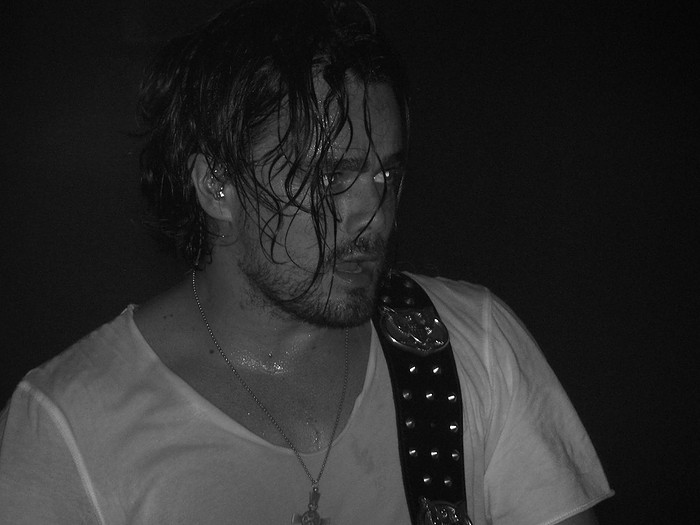
Woesthoff performing with Kane

Woesthoff and Dennis van Leeuwen met at a cafe in Scheveningen, where they were both working. In 1998 formed the band Citizen Kane and began performing for small audiences at various events. They were discovered by talent scout Henkjan Smits, who helped them sign a recording contract with BMG. With their name shortened to Kane, they rounded out their lineup with guitarist Tony Cornelissen, bassist Aram Kersbergen, and drummer Cyril Direct. The band broke through in 1999 with the hit "Where Do I Go Now".

In 2004, Woesthoff worked with Tiësto to remix the Kane song "Rain Down on Me", which topped the Flemish Ultratop 50 charts on 14 and 21 February 2004.

Kane disbanded in 2014, reunited in 2023, and broke up once more in 2025. Throughout their career, they released eight studio albums.

=== Solo work ===
Woesthoff issued the solo single "Legendary Lane" in 2014. From 2015 to 2016, he was a member of the jury in the RTL 4 program Superkids. After Kane's first split, Woesthoff focused on the production and promotion of the film Woezel & Pip Op zoek naar de Sloddervos!, which was released on 20 January 2016. It is based on a children's book written by his first wife, Guusje Nederhorst.

Woesthoff's first solo album, Luck of Birth, came out in May 2021. The single "Can You Hear Me" was issued in 2020 and achieved success.

In 2026, Woesthoff became a coach on the thirteenth season of The Voice of Holland, alongside Ilse DeLange, Willie Wartaal, and Suzan & Freek.

== Personal life ==
On 17 September 2003, Woesthoff married Dutch actress Guusje Nederhorst in Las Vegas, with whom he had a son on 29 June 2003. On 29 January 2004, Nederhorst died of breast cancer, at the age of 34. Woesthoff then released a single in her memory, "Dreamer (Gussie's Song)". The track, whose proceeds (273,000 euros) went to the Dutch Cancer Society, reached the number one position in the Netherlands and went platinum. Woesthoff remarried on 30 May 2009, and he has two sons and a daughter with his current wife, Lucy Hopkins.

=== Political views ===
Woesthoff was listed as a candidate for the Party for the Animals in 2017. The party focuses on animal rights and environmental issues. Woesthoff has expressed vocal support for Palestine during the Gaza war and has attended several Free Palestine protests.

== Discography ==
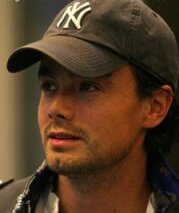
Woesthoff in 2008

=== with Kane ===
- As Long as You Want This (2000)
- So Glad You Made It (2001)
- What If (2003)
- Fearless (2005)
- Everything You Want (2008)
- No Surrender (2009)
- Come Together (2012)
- Exit & Entrances (2025)

=== Solo ===
Albums

- Luck of Birth (2021)

Singles

- "Dreamer (Gussie's Song)" (2004)
- "Legendary Lane" (2014)
- "Can You Hear Me" (2020)
- "Whatever Comes for Me" (2020)
- "You'll Never Know" (2020)
- "The Highest of All" (2021)
- "Patterns" (2021)
