= De Jeugd van Tegenwoordig =

Dutch hip hop and R&B group

De Jeugd Van Tegenwoordig
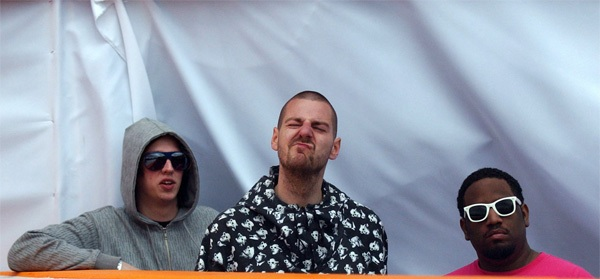
- De Jeugd Van Tegenwoordig

Background information
- Origin: Amsterdam, Netherlands
- Genres: Hip hop, electro
- Years active: 2005–present
- Labels: Top Notch, Magnetron Music
- Members: Willie Wartaal (real name: Olivier Mitshel Locadia); Vieze Fur (real name: Freddie Tratlehner); P. Faberyayo (real name: Pepijn Lanen); Bas Bron
- Website: Official website

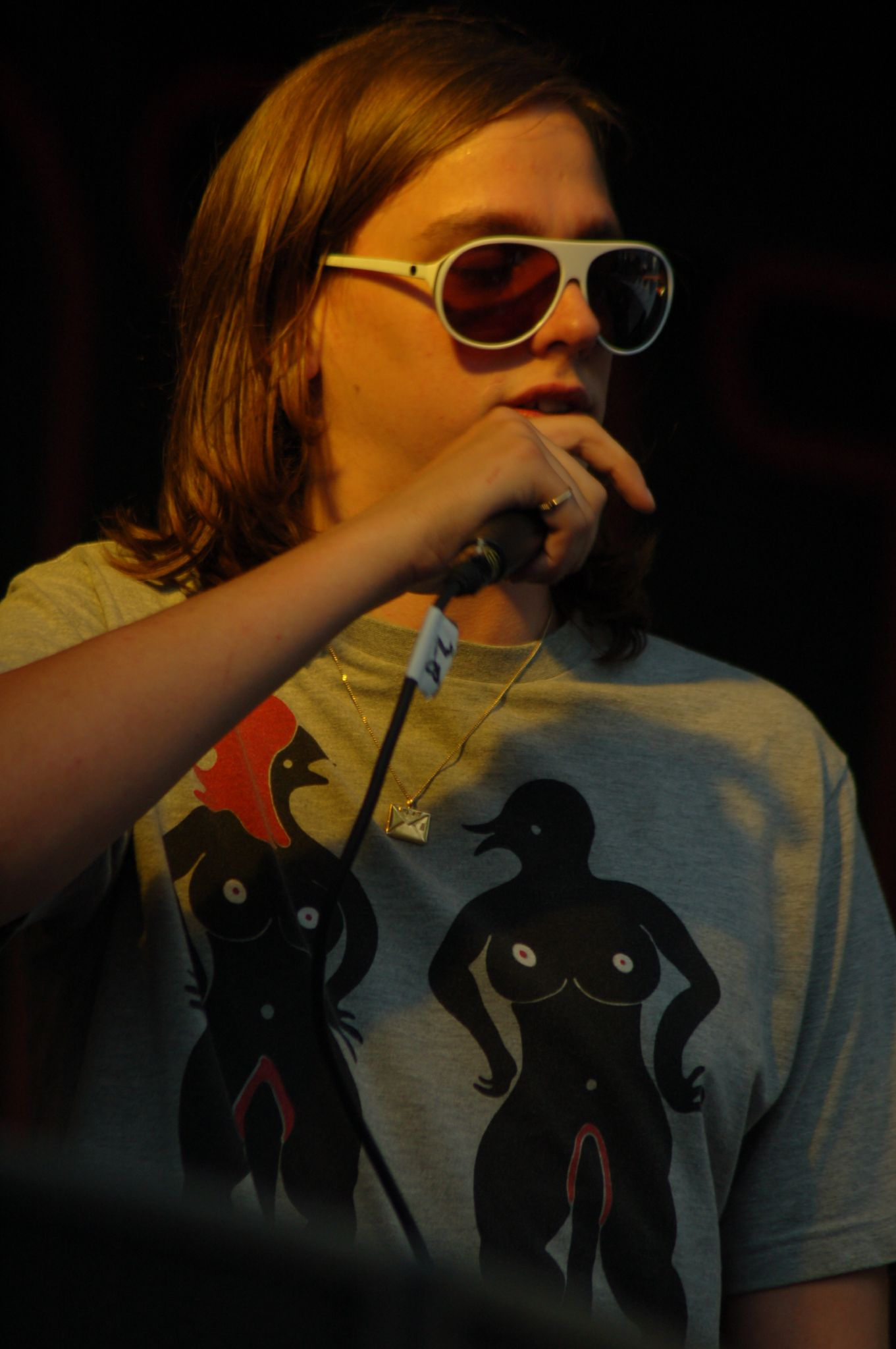
Pepijn Lanen

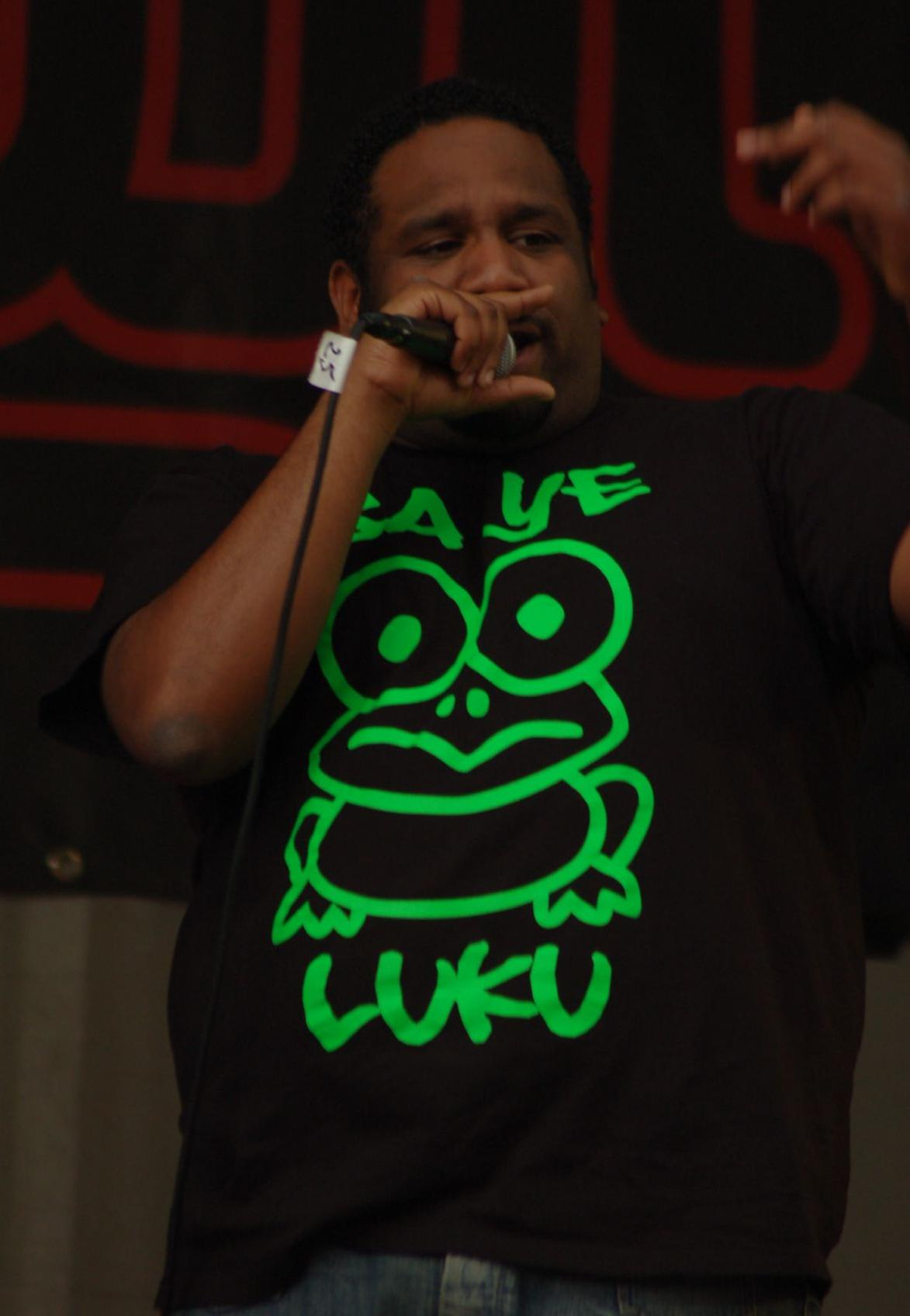
Willie Wartaal

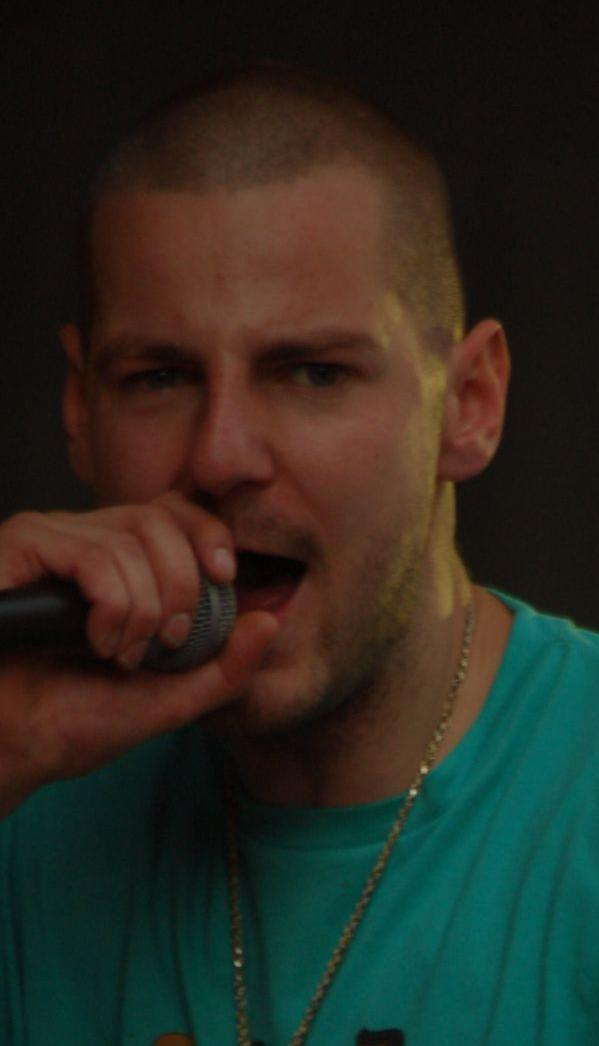
Vieze Fur

De Jeugd Van Tegenwoordig (The Youth These Days) is a Dutch hip hop and R&B group based in Amsterdam, Netherlands, renowned for their musical approach of irreverent, humorous lyrics and electronic beats. Their humorous style is characterized by their frequent use of word play, lyrical flirting with languages other than Dutch and the propagating of neologisms, such as "Watskeburt?!" (cf. the English wassup).

== Members ==
The group consists of producer Bas Bron and rappers Vjèze Fur (real name Freddie Tratlehner), also known as Vieze Freddie, Faberyayo (real name Pepijn Lanen), also known as P. Dronq or P. Fabergé or Peppie, and WiWa (real name Ollicio Locadia), also known as Willie Wartaal. When singing about his younger self WiWa also calls himself "Wiwaleantje" (little Wiwalean).

== History ==
=== Origin ===
The group originated from a project coordinated by Bas Bron to produce tracks with rapping from different Dutch rappers. Bron worked together with Pepijn Lanen to produce Dutch rapmusic under the name De Spaarndammerbuurtkliek. After watskeburt became a popular slang in Amsterdam, the two of them decided to create a song on it, which at first this was meant to stay between friends. Freddie Tratlehner, who knew Lanen as a rapper and was part of the group that popularised the word, brought a mutual friend to the studio to record and they eventually decided that he would be rapping in the song.

Tratlehner, who was already acquainted with Olivier Locadia, formed a rap group named Baksteen. Locadia did not rap on Watskeburt?!, but later on recorded the song Voorjekijkendoorlopen with Bron and Tratlehner. Bron decided to record an album with the three of them. The inspiration for the name De Jeugd Van Tegenwoordig came from a T-shirt that Lanen's brother wore with that phrase printed on it. The name was meant to be slightly ironic since they were already in their early twenties when the band started.

During interviews about the release of Watskeburt?!, De Jeugd Van Tegenwoordig liked to spread ridiculous stories on the origin of the song. Lanen would tell people that he found the lyrics of the song in the subway. The biography that would be released with the song, says that the three met each other at an audition for Idols. These statements where picked up by a few media outlets, usually the three would change the story to make it sound more ridiculous in other interviews.

=== Watskeburt?! ===
The beat for Watskeburt?! was produced by Bas Bron in late 2004. The only two rappers on the song are Vieze Fur and Faberyayo. The phrase 'Watskeburt' derived from a text message that the Dutch rapper Heist Rockah send to his cousin. On 16 May 2005, the single Watskeburt?! was released by Magnetron Music in collaboration with Top Notch. In the first place it did not catch on, but it was discovered by several radio stations. Within a month it reached the Dutch Top 40. The song became a hit and took the number one position several days later. In the same week De Jeugd were scheduled to perform the support act for Snoop Dogg at Ahoy. In August 2005 they performed at Lowlands

Like many notable hits, there were parodies for Watskeburt?!. Waarsmebird and Opkeplurt are a few examples of this. There were also German, Frysian and West-Frysian versions of the song. There was a parody group called De Student van Tegenwoordig with a parody called Noggeneukt?!, which was a famous in the student city Utrecht. In Groningen there was a parody called Supermooi!. After the release of Watskeburt?!, the online youth magazine Spunk translated the lyrics to German with the title Watspassiert?!

=== Parels Voor De Zwijnen ===
On 23 August 2005, the group received a scoop with the song Voorjekijkendoorlopen by being the first Dutch band to release a song as ringtone before presenting it as a single. They also received an award in 2005 for most watched music video.

In 2005 their debut album Parels Voor De Zwijnen released with 20 songs. De Jeugd Van Tegenwoordig received the Dutch Mobo Award for Best breakthrough. They sold up to 8000 copies of this album.

On 17 October they received their own show named, Hard Gaan, on the TV channel The Box Comedy.

In 2006 the trio received an award for the best newcomer from the 3FM Awards and Edison Music Award. They officially released the single Watskeburt?! in Germany and the UK. Furthermore, they recorded a single with Luie Hond called Poes in de Playboy

On 8 September they produced a four-part soapseries on BNN, called De Jeugd Van Tegenwoordig op hun best.

In 2006 the group was nominated for the Urban Awards, TMF Awards 2006 (Nederland) and Gouden Greep.

In 2007 the single Shenkie was released. In collaboration with TMF, the group thought up a contest for the clip. Their DVD Tarrels voor de Zwijnen was released with videoclips, every episode of their miniserie Hard Gaan and never before seen footage. The single Shenkie got nominated for best single and clip at the Urban Awards and Gouden Greep

=== De Machine ===
The trio announced a second album with 14 tracks on 3 January 2008. De Machine was leaked 18 April on the internet and could be found in stores on 25 April. The first track was Hollereer. The music video for Hollereer was broadcast for the first time on 4 April on TMF and was the debut of IM Creative Productions (IMCP). Followed up with Wopwopwop (De tentbakkers) and Datvindjeleukhé. The album won the 3Voor12Award as the best album of 2008. They also won a MTV Award for best Dutch/Belgium artist. They have been nominated for the State Awards in 5 categories, but did not win any awards.

On 14 January 2009 the group was a guest on the show De Wereld Draait Door and presented for the first time their music video for their single Buma in me zak, which according to themselves is the "sickest" music video in Dutch history. The single refers to the company Buma/Stemra, an organisation that has a monopoly in collecting on copyright of music. The inspiration of the music video came from the song Can you feel it by The Jackson 5. They eventually produced 7 music videos for the album, but none of the singles made it to the Dutch top 40. Deze donkere jongen komt zo hard only reached some popularity in Flanders.

The trio performed in 2009 on Pinkpop and Rock Werchter and has been nominated for a 3FM-, TMF- and Edison Award.

=== De Lachende Derde ===
The recordings for De Lachende Derde took place in the winter of 2009-2010 and was released on 26 November 2010. The first single of the album was Sterrenstof. The lyrics of the album were, together with all previous lyrics from De Jeugd, recorded in a book called Handboek der Jeugd, which was published in June 2011 by Nijgh & Van Ditmar.

They were the opening act on the Belgium music festival Rock Werchter

On 18 August 2012, they performed at Lowlands. After a few performances they join the Belgium band Triggerfinger on stage and perform the single Sexy beesten. On 12 April 2012, they won a 3FM Award for best HipHop artist.

=== Ja, Natúúrlijk! ===
On 7 June 2013, they released the single De formule. On 7 August 2013, surfaced a single called Een Barkie. This is the second single for the planned album on 27 September 2013, called Ja, Natúúrlijk!. On 17 September 2013, De Jeugd presented their third single, Prinsjesdag, which was free to download on Prinsjesdag. The fourth single of the album was Het mysterie van de koude schouder.

=== Manon en De Jeugd, Vertegenwoordigd ===
On 23 October 2015, the fifth albume was released, Manon. It existed of twelve songs. The single Manon appeared on 5 September 2015. With this album Manon, De Jeugd made an ode to women. They also released a music video: 3-in-1 video for the singles Zakmeuitdeheup, BPM69 and Lente in bed.

In 2015 De Jeugd celebrated their 10th anniversary and asked artists who they befriended to perform one of their songs, which on 15 January 2016, appeared on a cd De Jeugd, Vertegenwoordigd. Among others Guus Meeuwis, Nielson, Glennis Grace, Raymond van het Groenewoud, The Kik and Frank Boeijen gave their cooperation. On 20 December 2016, the premiere for the musical Watskeburt?! took place with puppets.

=== Luek ===
On 16 February 2018 appeared their sixth album, Luek with 13 singles. The single Gemist was released on 28 November 2017, almost three months before the album. The title Luek was misspelled as Leuk by streaming media which can be translated to nice/fun.

=== Anders (Different) ===
On 9 November 2018, appeared their seventh album, Anders(Different). This album existed of 12 singles which goes back to the (rock)music from the past. The announcement was unexpected, due to Luek being only 9 months old. They still released the single Ik kwam haar tegen in de moshpit with their announcement of a new album on 2 November 2018.

== Discography ==
=== Albums ===
Year	Title
2005	Parels Voor De Zwijnen
2008	De Machine
2010	De Lachende Derde
2013	Ja, Natúúrlijk!
2015	Manon
2018	Luek
2018	Anders (Different)
2023	Moderne Manieren

=== Singles ===
Year	Single	Album	Peak Position		
Year	Single	Album	Dutch Top 40	Dutch Top 100	Flemish Ultratop
2005	"Watskeburt?!"	Parels Voor De Zwijnen	1	1	15
2005	"Voorjekijkendoorlopen"	Parels Voor De Zwijnen	-	40	-
2005	"Ho Ho Ho" (ft. Katja Schuurman)	-	32	25	-
2006	"Poes in de Playboy" (with Luie Hond)	Met Liefde	-	41	-
2007	"Shenkie"	-	-	43	-
2008	"Hollereer"	De Machine	-	11	36
2008	"Wopwopwop (De Tentbakkers)"	De Machine	-	-	-
2008	"Datvindjeleukhe"	De Machine	-	-	-
2009	"Buma In Mijn Zak"	De Machine	-	-	-
2009	"Deze Donkere Jongen komt zo Hard"	De Machine	-	-	35
2010	"Sterrenstof"	De Lachende Derde	8*	7*	-
