= Guusje Nederhorst =

Dutch actress and singer (1969–2004)

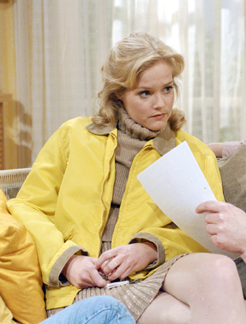
- Nederhorst in 1995
- Born: Barbara Augustine Nederhorst; 4 February 1969; Amsterdam, Netherlands
- Died: 29 January 2004 (aged 34); The Hague, Netherlands
- Occupations: Actress; singer
- Years active: 1991–2004
- Spouse: Dinand Woesthoff (m. 2003)
- Children: 1

Barbara Augustine "Guusje" Woesthoff-Nederhorst (4 February 1969 – 29 January 2004) was a Dutch actress and singer, known for appearing in the soap opera Goede tijden, slechte tijden.

== Career ==
Nederhorst became known for playing Roos Alberts-de Jager in the television soap opera Goede tijden, slechte tijden (GTST), a role she held from 1992 until 2000. With her GTST co-stars Babette van Veen and Katja Schuurman, she formed the girl group Linda, Roos & Jessica; they performed under the names of their GTST characters. Nederhorst later appeared in the soap opera Onderweg naar morgen, the drama film All Stars, and the Curaçao-set telenovela Bon bini beach.

== Personal life ==
In September 2003, Nederhorst married Kane frontman Dinand Woesthoff, with whom she had a son in June of that year. Soon after, it was announced that Nederhorst had breast cancer. She died of complications from the disease on 29 January 2004, aged 34.

== Selected filmography ==
List of appearances, with year, title, and role shown
Year	Title	Role	Notes
1992–2001	Goede tijden, slechte tijden	Roos Alberts-de Jager	
1997	All Stars	herself	Film
2001	Baantjer	Mensje van Diepen	1 episode
2002	Onderweg naar morgen	Angela Bolhuys	
2002–03	Bon bini beach	girl in love	
