= Yamaha DGX-620 =

Digital piano

DGX-620
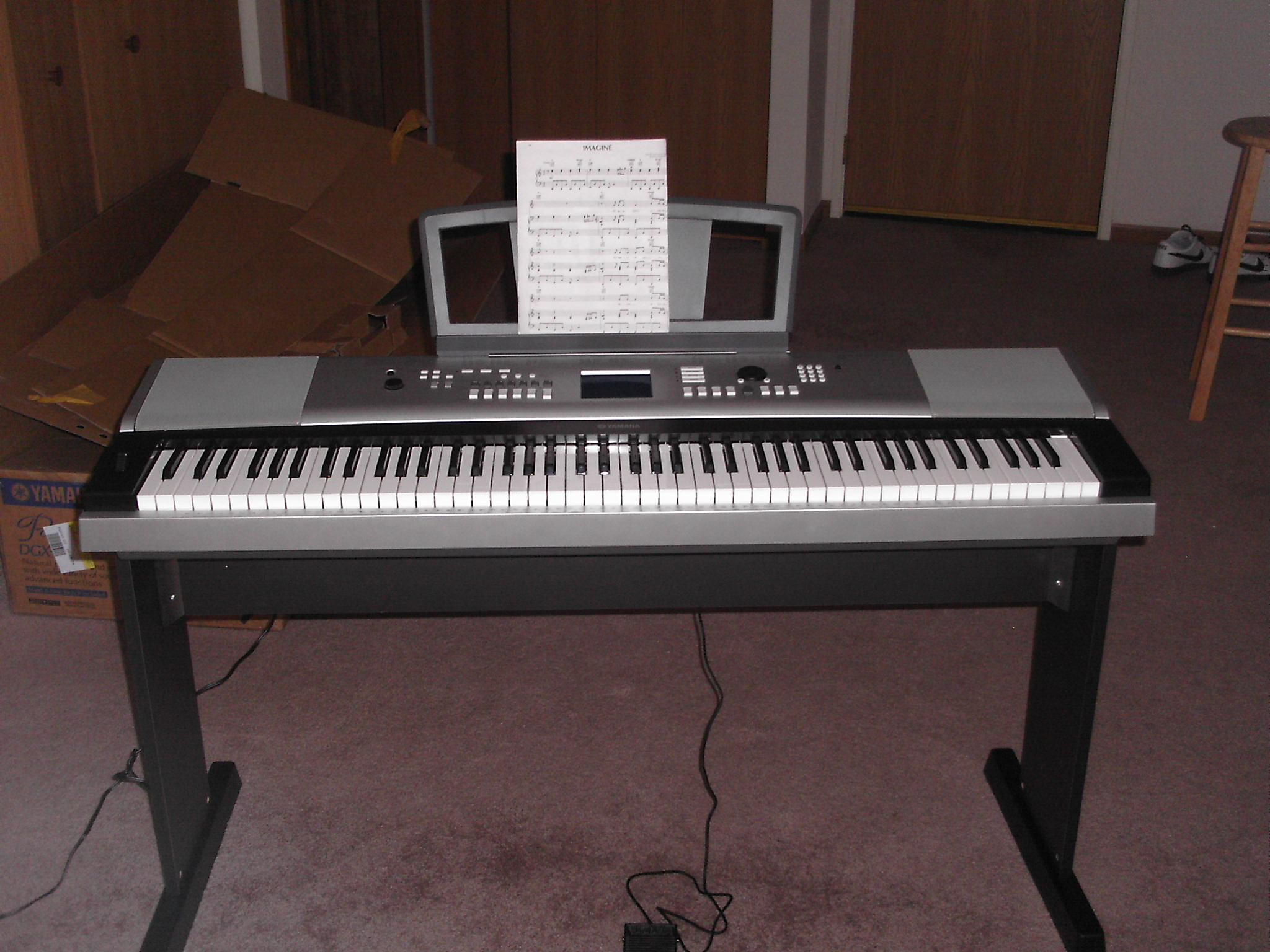
- DGX-620 in 2006
- Manufacturer: Yamaha

Technical specifications
- Polyphony: 32
- Timbrality: Multitimbral
- Synthesis type: Sampler
- Aftertouch expression: no
- Velocity expression: yes

Input/output
- Keyboard: 88-key
- External control: MIDI

The Yamaha DGX-620 is the name of a digital piano (also known as the YPG-625). The lettering DGX encompasses the word Digital Grand whereas YPG stands for Yamaha Portable Grand, and the only difference between the names are the markets they are sold in. It was released by Yamaha Corporation in late 2006, the first model of the DGX/YPG series with weighted keys.

The DGX-620 is an improved version of the earlier Yamaha DGX-520 keyboard. In June 2008 the Yamaha DGX-630 (aka YPG-635) replaced the DGX-620. The next successor, the Yamaha DGX-640, was released in 2010. In 2013, the DGX-650 Digital Piano was released. This was later replaced by the Yamaha DGX-660 (available in the same colors as the 650). The DGX-660 was replaced in 2021 by the DGX-670, which adds a color display, as well as features similar to the PSR-S and -SX series keyboards such as Super Articulation voices and an improved style section. The DGX-670 is now the flagship model of the Portable Grand series.

The Yamaha DGX 620 keyboard has the ability to show the score of the song and allows the user to learn from existing midi files.

== See also ==
- List of Yamaha products
