= Torakusu Yamaha =

Founder of Yamaha

- 山葉寅楠
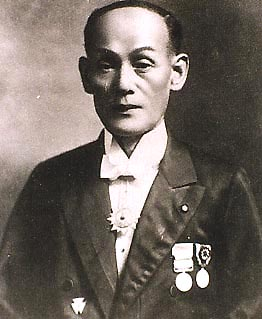
- Born: April 20, 1851; Wakayama, Kii Province, Japan
- Died: August 8, 1916 (aged 65); Tokyo, Japan
- Occupations: Founder and CEO of Nippon Gakki Co Ltd
- Years active: 1887–1916
- Known for: Founding of Yamaha Corporation

Torakusu Yamaha (山葉寅楠, Yamaha Torakusu; 20 April 1851 – 8 August 1916) was a Japanese businessman and entrepreneur known as the founder of the Yamaha Corporation.

Yamaha was the first Japanese manufacturer of the reed organ and established Nippon Gakki Co Ltd in Hamamatsu to produce organs and other musical instruments including pianos and harmonicas. Nippon Gakki was later renamed the Yamaha Corporation in his honor.

== Biography ==
=== Early life ===
Torakusu Yamaha was born on 20 April 1851 in Wakayama, Kii Province, the third son of Konosuke Yamaha, a low-ranking samurai of the Kishu-Tokugawa family, the ruling family of the Kishu Domain. Torakusu's father was an astronomer for the Kishu clan, who gave Torakusu access to books about astronomy. As a result, Torakusu became fascinated with machines and technology, in addition to his interests in martial arts and kendo. In his twenties, Japanese society changed rapidly with the arrival of the Meiji Restoration in 1868, and Torakusu saw many opportunities as the era brought Westernization and the introduction of new technologies to Japan. In 1871, Torakusu went to Nagasaki and started studying watchmaking under the guidance of an English engineer. After a few years of training, Torakusu became an expert in watchmaking and later became interested in medical equipment. Torakusu then moved to Osaka to study medical equipment, where he lived behind a medical equipment store.

In 1886, at the age of 35, Torakusu moved to Hamamatsu to repair medical equipment as a career. However, since Hamamatsu was a small town back then, Torakusu could not make a living repairing medical equipment, so he also repaired watches and served as a rickshaw man for a hospital director. A local primary school, Jinjou Elementary School (now Hamamatsu City Motoshiro Elementary School) asked him to fix their broken reed organ, as the town was small and they did not have anyone who was qualified to fix one. Accepting the offer, Torakusu soon discovered the cause of the problem, which was two broken springs, and studied the springs with the intent of producing them himself. Torakusu also received financial help from Toyasaku Fukushima, the director of Hamamatsu Hospital. Torakusu then started the project in a one-room workshop with the help of a colleague from the medical equipment work.

In 1887, two months after the project started, Torakusu and his colleague produced the first Japanese-made reed organ. After receiving negative comments, Torakusu moved closer to the music department of Tokyo. To get the organ to the university, he was forced to carry it over a distance of 250 kilometres (160 mi). After presenting the instrument to the university, professors at the university said the instrument was badly conceived. Torakusu was then allowed to attend lectures about different theories of music at the university for a month. Back in Hamamatsu, Torakusu built the second organ in the remaining two months of the year. It was rated as "good as those from abroad". Shortly after, he received an order for seven organs, including that for the governor of Shizuoka Prefecture.

In March 1888, Torakusu used an abandoned Hamamatsu Temple to make organs with the help of carpenters and cabinet makers.

=== Nippon Gakki Co Ltd ===
In 1887, Torakusu founded Nippon Gakki Co Ltd. and used a drawing of a Chinese phoenix holding a tuning fork in its beak as the company's logo. After founding the company, Torakusu set up a manufacturing plant with modern assembly lines. In 1889, the Minister of Education asked the president of Nippon Gakki to look into the administration system and working conditions of musical instruments in schools. In the same year, Nippon Gakki sold nearly 250 organs to several schools in Japan. With this success, the company looked into the production of pianos, harmonicas, and xylophones. In 1899, Torakusu made a five-month tour to the United States, visiting W.W. Kimball and Company, Mason and Hamlin, and Steinway and Sons. In 1900, Torakusu and Nippon Gakki produced its first upright piano.

In March 1902, Torakusu received the Medal of Honor with Green Ribbon. Torakusu also served as a director of Hamamatsu Railway (later the Enshu Railway Okuyama Line), the local railway in the Hamamatsu area.

In 1911, Torakusu was elected to the Hamamatsu City Council and appointed as the Vice Chairman of the council.

Torakusu taught instrument making to an apprentice named Koichi Kawai, who was 11 years old at the time, during his early career as the founder of the company Nippon Gakki. When Kawai grew up, founded a company named Kawai Musical Instruments which soon became rivals with Nippon Gakki.

=== Death ===
Yamaha died of an illness in Tokyo on 8 August 1916 at the age of 65 years. Following his death, Vice President Chiyomaru Amano took over as the CEO of Nippon Gakki. In 1987, 100 years after the first reed organ built by Yamaha, the company was renamed Yamaha Corporation in honor of its founder.
