= Spunk.nl =

Dutch online youth magazine

- Website: www.spunk.nl

Spunk.nl was a Dutch e-zine representing Dutch youth culture. The e-zine boasted 150.000 weekly visitors and from 2003 to 2007 served as the online youth magazine of the daily evening newspaper NRC Handelsblad.
