= Yamaha Corporation =

Japanese music and audio equipment maker

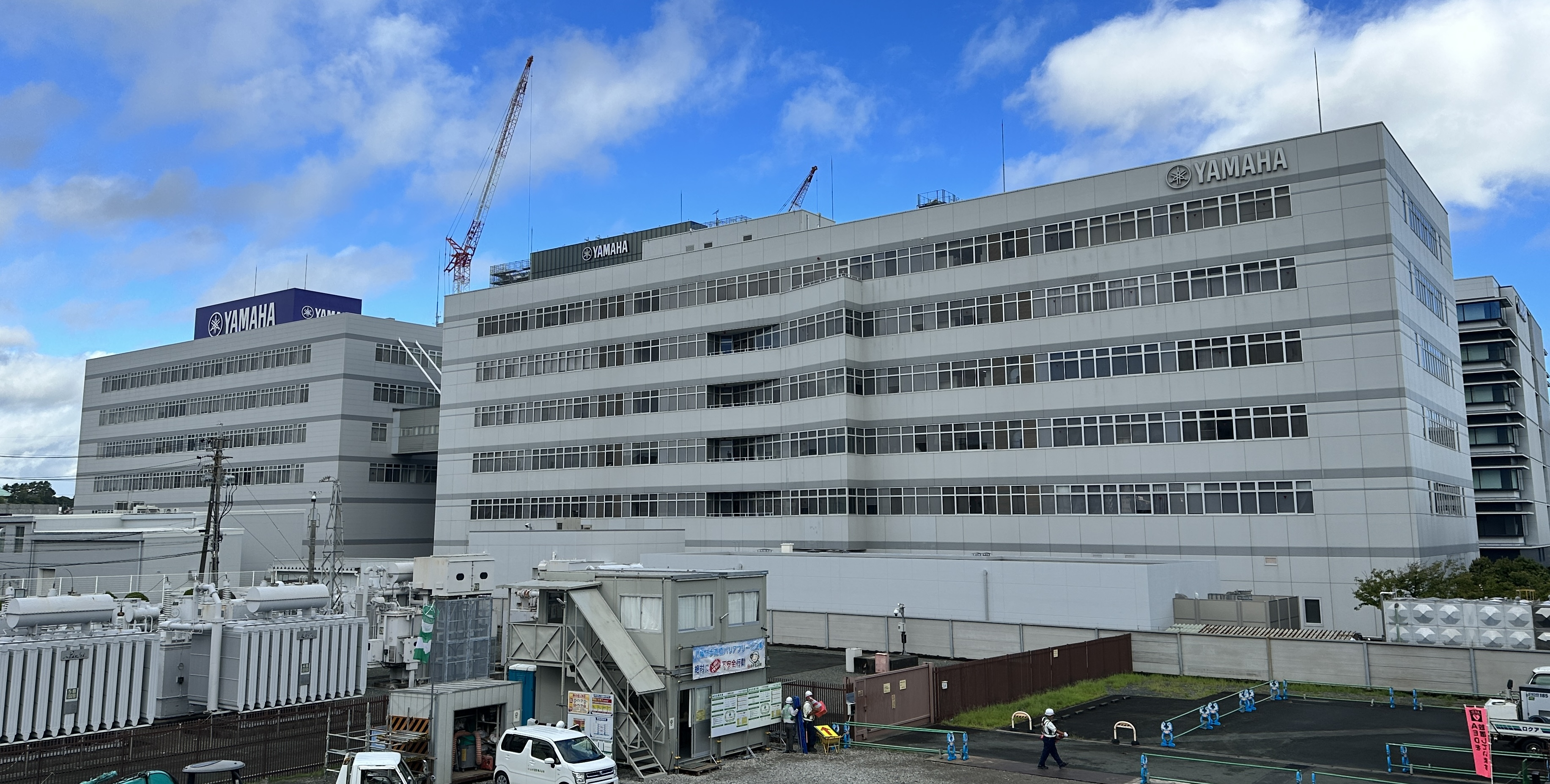
- Yamaha Corporation's headquarters in Hamamatsu, Japan
- Native name: ヤマハ株式会社 (Japanese)
- Romanized name: Yamaha kabushiki gaisha
- Formerly: Nippon Gakki Co., Ltd. (1887–1987)
- Type: Public
- Traded as: TYO: 7951; Nikkei 225 component
- Industry: Manufacturing
- Founded: 12 October 1887; 139 years ago
- Founder: Torakusu Yamaha
- Headquarters: 10–1, Nakazawacho, Naka-ku, Hamamatsu, Shizuoka, Japan
- Area served: Worldwide
- Key people: Takuya Nakata (president and Representative Executive Officer)
- Products: Musical instruments, audio equipment
- Revenue: ▼¥462.08 billion (2025)
- Operating income: ▼¥22,462 billion (2025)
- Net income: ▼¥13,351 billion (2025)
- Number of employees: 24,653 (including temporary employees) (2025)
- Subsidiaries: List: Ampeg; Bösendorfer; Deagan; Line 6; Steinberg; Yamaha Artist Services; Yamaha Drums; Yamaha Entertainment Group; Yamaha Pro Audio; Yamaha Guitar Group, Inc.; Yamaha Music Europe GmbH
- Website: yamaha.com

Yamaha Corporation (ヤマハ株式会社, Yamaha Kabushiki gaisha; /ˈjɑːməhɑː/; Japanese pronunciation: [jamaha]) is a Japanese multinational musical instrument and audio equipment manufacturer.

It is one of the constituents of Nikkei 225 and is the world's largest musical instrument manufacturing company.

The former motorcycle division was established in 1955 as Yamaha Motor Co., Ltd., which started as an affiliated company but has been spun-off as its own independent company.

== History ==
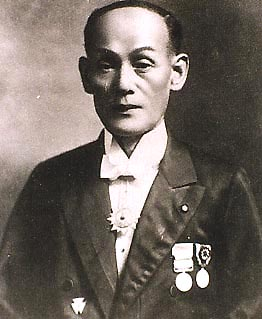
Torakusu Yamaha, founder of Yamaha Corporation

Nippon Gakki Co., Ltd. (日本楽器製造株式会社, Nihon Gakki Seizō Kabushiki gaisha; lit. 'Japan Musical Instrument Manufacture') was established in 1887 as a reed organ manufacturer by Torakusu Yamaha (山葉寅楠) in Hamamatsu, Shizuoka Prefecture, and was incorporated on 12 October 1897. In 1900, the company manufactured the first piano to be made in Japan, and its first grand piano two years later. In 1987, 100 years after the first reed organ built by Yamaha, the company was renamed Yamaha Corporation in honor of its founder. The company's origins as a musical instrument manufacturer are still reflected today in the group's logo—a trio of interlocking tuning forks.

After World War II, company president Genichi Kawakami repurposed the remains of the company's war-time production machinery and the company's expertise in metallurgical technologies to the manufacture of motorcycles. The YA-1 (AKA Akatombo, the "Red Dragonfly"), of which 125 were built in the first year of production (1954), was named in honour of the founder. It was a 125cc, single cylinder, two-stroke street bike patterned after the German DKW RT 125 (which the British munitions firm, BSA, had also copied in the post-war era and manufactured as the Bantam and Harley-Davidson as the Hummer). In 1955, the success of the YA-1 resulted in the founding of Yamaha Motor Co., Ltd., splitting the motorcycle division from the company. Also, in 1954 the Yamaha Music School was founded.

Yamaha has grown into the world's largest manufacturer of musical instruments (including pianos, "silent" pianos, drums, guitars, brass instruments, woodwinds, violins, violas, cellos, and vibraphones), and a leading manufacturer of semiconductors, audio/visual, computer-related products, sporting goods, home appliances, specialty metals, and industrial robots. Yamaha released the Yamaha CS-80 in 1977.

In 1983, Yamaha made the first commercially successful digital synthesizer, the Yamaha DX7.

In 1988, Yamaha shipped the world's first CD recorder. Yamaha purchased Sequential Circuits in 1988. It bought a majority stake (51%) of competitor Korg in 1987, which was bought out by Korg in 1993.

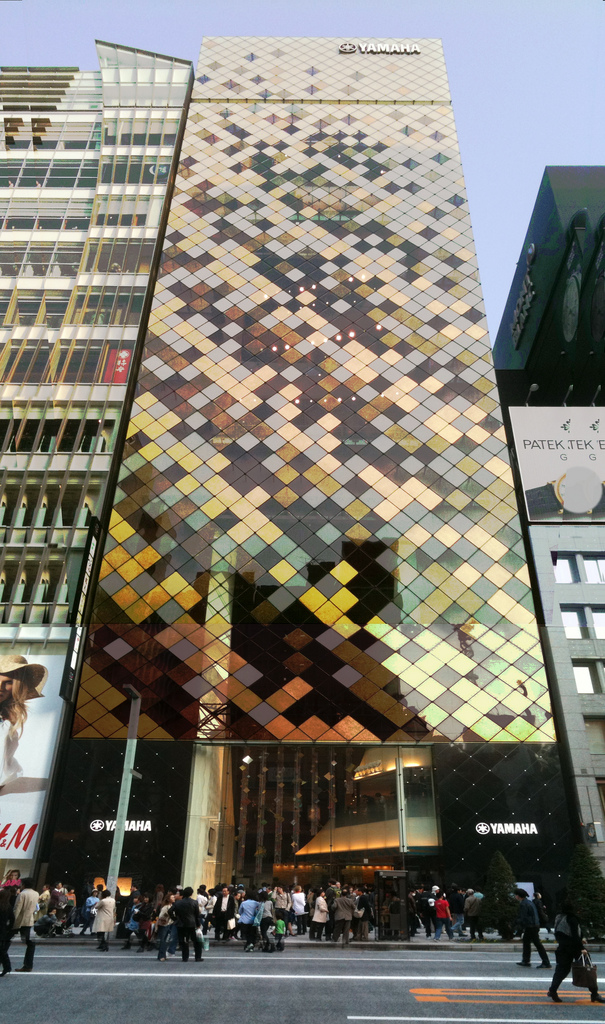
Yamaha Ginza Building in Tokyo is the largest musical instrument store in Japan. The complex includes a shopping area, concert hall, and music studio.

In the late 1990s, Yamaha released a series of portable battery-operated keyboards under the PSS and the PSR range of keyboards. The Yamaha PSS-14 and PSS-15 keyboards were upgrades to the Yamaha PSS-7 with short demo songs, short selectable phrases, and sound effects.

In 2002, Yamaha closed its archery product business that was started in 1959. Six archers in five different Olympic Games won gold medals using their products.

In January 2005, it acquired German audio software manufacturer Steinberg from Pinnacle Systems. In July 2007, Yamaha bought out the minority shareholding of the Kemble family in Yamaha-Kemble Music (UK) Ltd., Yamaha's UK import and musical instrument and professional audio equipment sales division. It was renamed Yamaha Music U.K. Ltd. in late 2007. Kemble & Co. Ltd., the UK piano sales & manufacturing arm, was unaffected.

On 20 December 2007, Yamaha made an agreement with the Austrian Bank BAWAG PSK Gruppe to purchase all the shares of Bösendorfer, with Yamaha intending to continue manufacturing at the Bösendorfer facilities in Austria. The acquisition was announced on 28 January 2008, after the NAMM Show in Los Angeles. As of 1 February 2008, Bösendorfer Klavierfabrik GmbH operates as a subsidiary of Yamaha Corporation.

Yamaha electronics have proven to be successful, popular, and respected products. For example, the Yamaha YPG-625 was awarded "Keyboard of the Year" and "Product of the Year" in 2007 from The Music and Sound Retailer magazine. Other noteworthy Yamaha electronics include the SHS-10 Keytar, a consumer-priced keytar which offered MIDI output features normally found on much more expensive keyboards.

== Business segments ==
Yamaha is segmented into three primary business domains of musical instruments, audio equipment, and others (industrial machinery and components, etc.)

- Musical Instruments – the manufacture and sales of pianos; digital musical instruments; brass, woodwind, string, and percussion instruments; and other music-related activities.
  - Pianos and celestas
  - Digital Musical Instruments
  - Brass and Woodwinds, Strings/Percussion
  - Guitars
- Audio Equipment – the manufacture and sales of audio products, professional audio equipment, information and telecommunication equipment, and certain other products.
  - Consumer
    - Yamaha Home Audio
  - B2B
    - Yamaha Pro Audio
    - Yamaha Unified Communications, Inc.
- Industrial Machinery and Components (IMC) & others – electronic devices business, automobile interior wood components, factory automation (FA) equipment, golf products and a resort business.

=== Living room business ===
The company began by manufacturing high-end furniture based on its expertise in wood processing for piano manufacturing, and was spun off into a separate company in 1991 with the establishment of YAMAHA Livingtec (YLT). The company manufactured and sold unit baths, system kitchens, and other products. In 1992, the company decided to stop selling system furniture, and after narrowing down its product lineup, it terminated orders and production in March 2005.

In 2010, Yamaha sold its 85.1% stake in YLT to Japan Industrial Partners and three foreign investment funds as part of a restructuring. At this point, the YAMAHA brand and company name continued, but the company essentially withdrew from management. Subsequently, YLT conducted a MBO of the investments of Yamaha and the investment funds, changed the company name as of 1 October 2013, and withdrew from the housing equipment business in both name and reality.

=== Subsidiaries ===
Other companies in the Yamaha Corporation group include:

- Ampeg
- L. Bösendorfer Klavierfabrik GmbH
- Line 6
- Steinberg Media Technologies GmbH
- Yamaha Artist Services, Inc.
- Yamaha Corporation of America
- Yamaha Drums
- Yamaha Fine Technologies Co., Ltd.
- Yamaha Music Communications Co., Ltd.
- Yamaha Music (Asia) Private Limited
- Yamaha Music Europe GmbH
- Yamaha Music Australia Pty. Ltd.
- Yamaha Guitar Group, Inc
- Yamaha Pro Audio
- Yamaha Unified Communications, Inc.

== Corporate mission ==
Kandō (感動) is a Japanese word used by Yamaha Corporation to describe its corporate mission. Kandō is the sensation of profound excitement and gratification derived from experiencing supreme quality and performance. Some reasonable English equivalents are "emotionally touching" or "emotionally moving".

== Yamaha Music Foundation ==
Yamaha Corporation is widely known for its music teaching program that began in 1954. In a continuation of that program, the Yamaha Music Foundation was established by the authority of the Japanese Ministry of Education for the purpose of promoting music education and music popularization In 1966.

== Products ==
Yamaha expanded into many diverse businesses and product groups. The first venture into each major category is listed below.

- 1887 – Reed organs
- 1900 – Pianos
- 1903 – Furniture
- 1914 – Harmonicas
- 1922 – Audio equipment (crank phonograph first)
- 1942 – Guitars
- 1955 – Motorcycles – made by Yamaha Motor Company, which started as an affiliated company of Nippon Gakki (Yamaha Corporation's name at the time) but is a separate company today
- 1959 – Sporting goods (starting with archery)
- 1959 – Music schools
- 1961 – Metal alloys
- 1965 – Band instruments (trumpet first)
- 1967 – Drums
- 1971 – Semiconductors
- 2000 – Yamaha Music Communications (record company)
- 2001 – Yamaha Entertainment Group (record company)
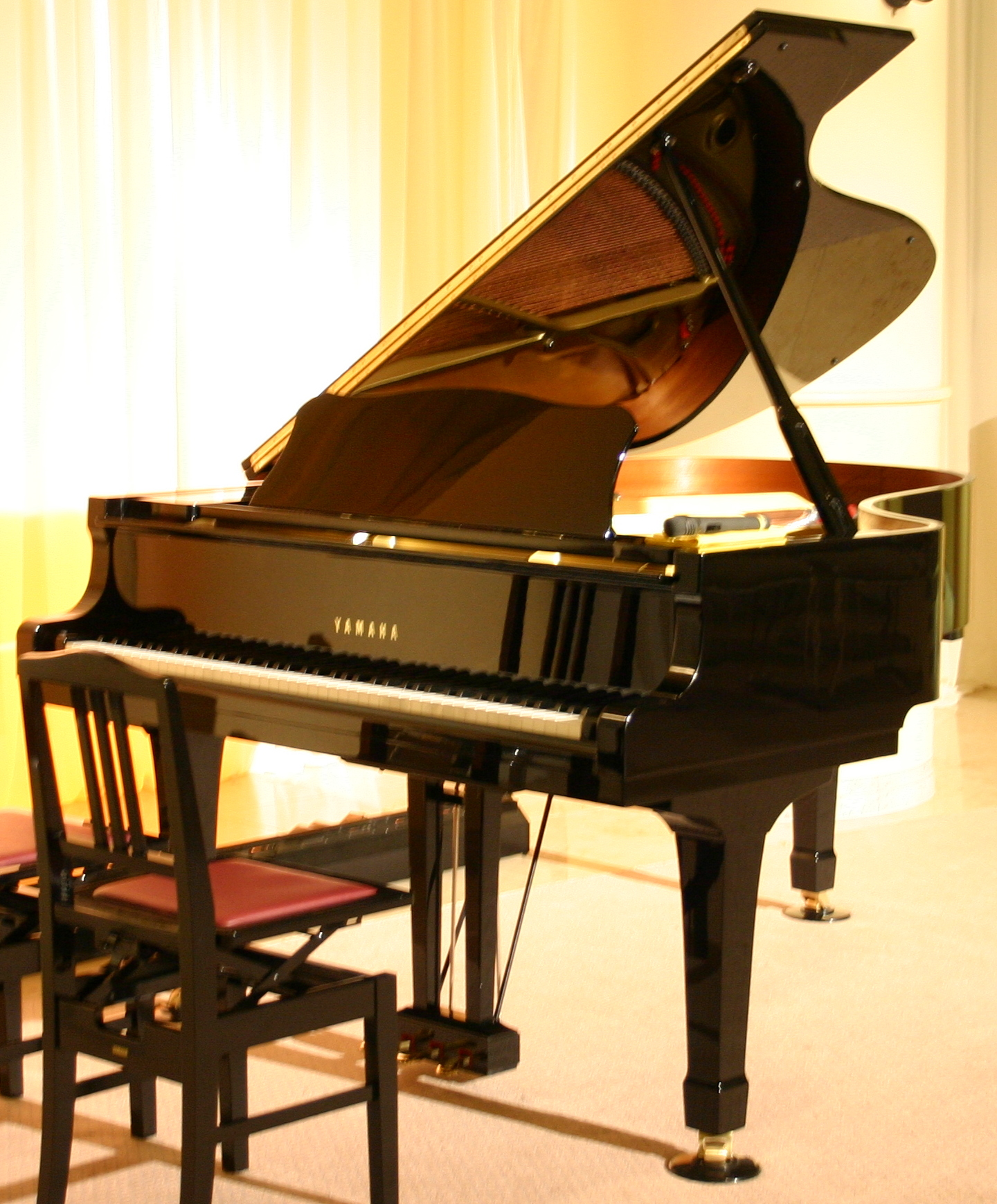
Yamaha Grand Piano

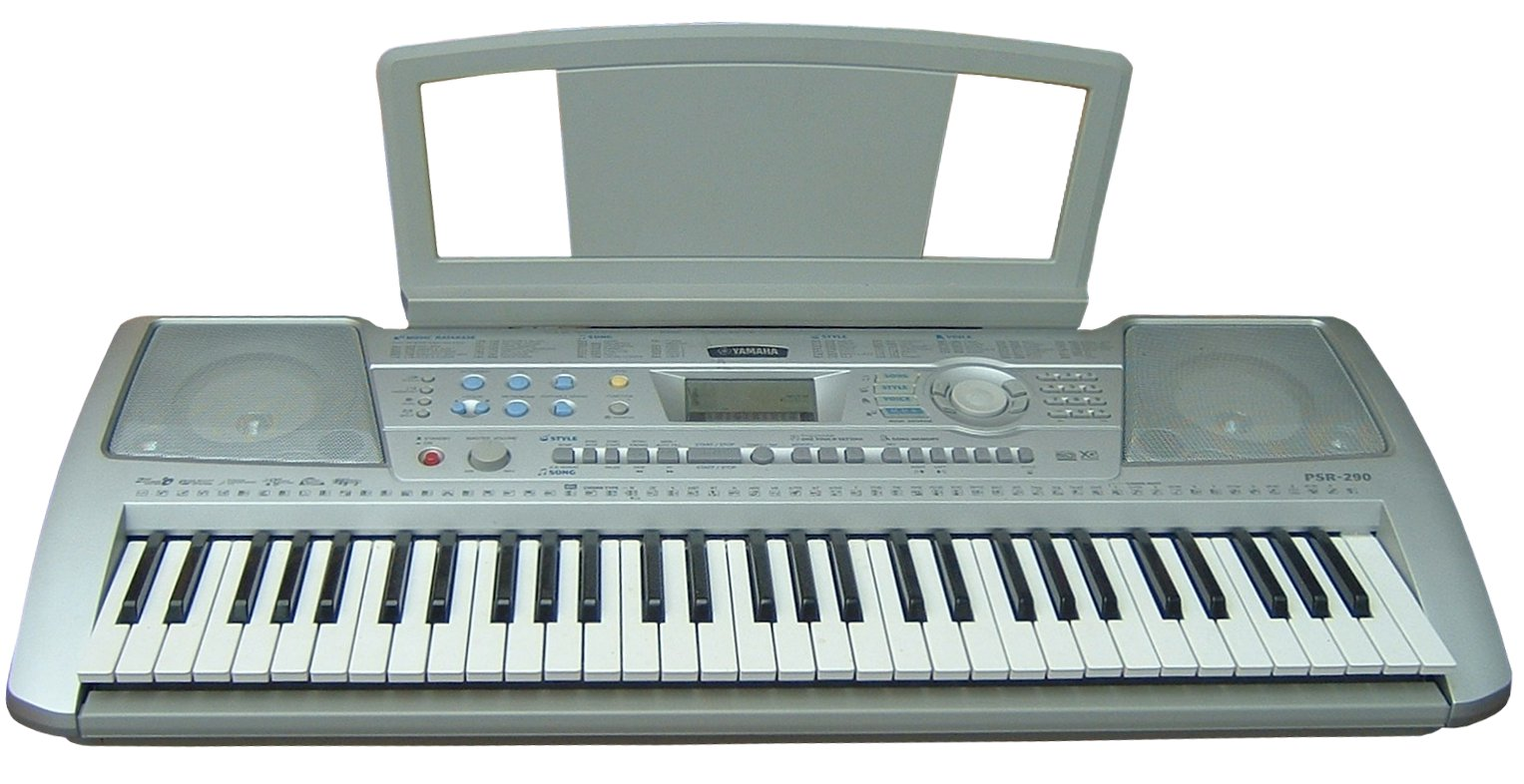
Yamaha Keyboard

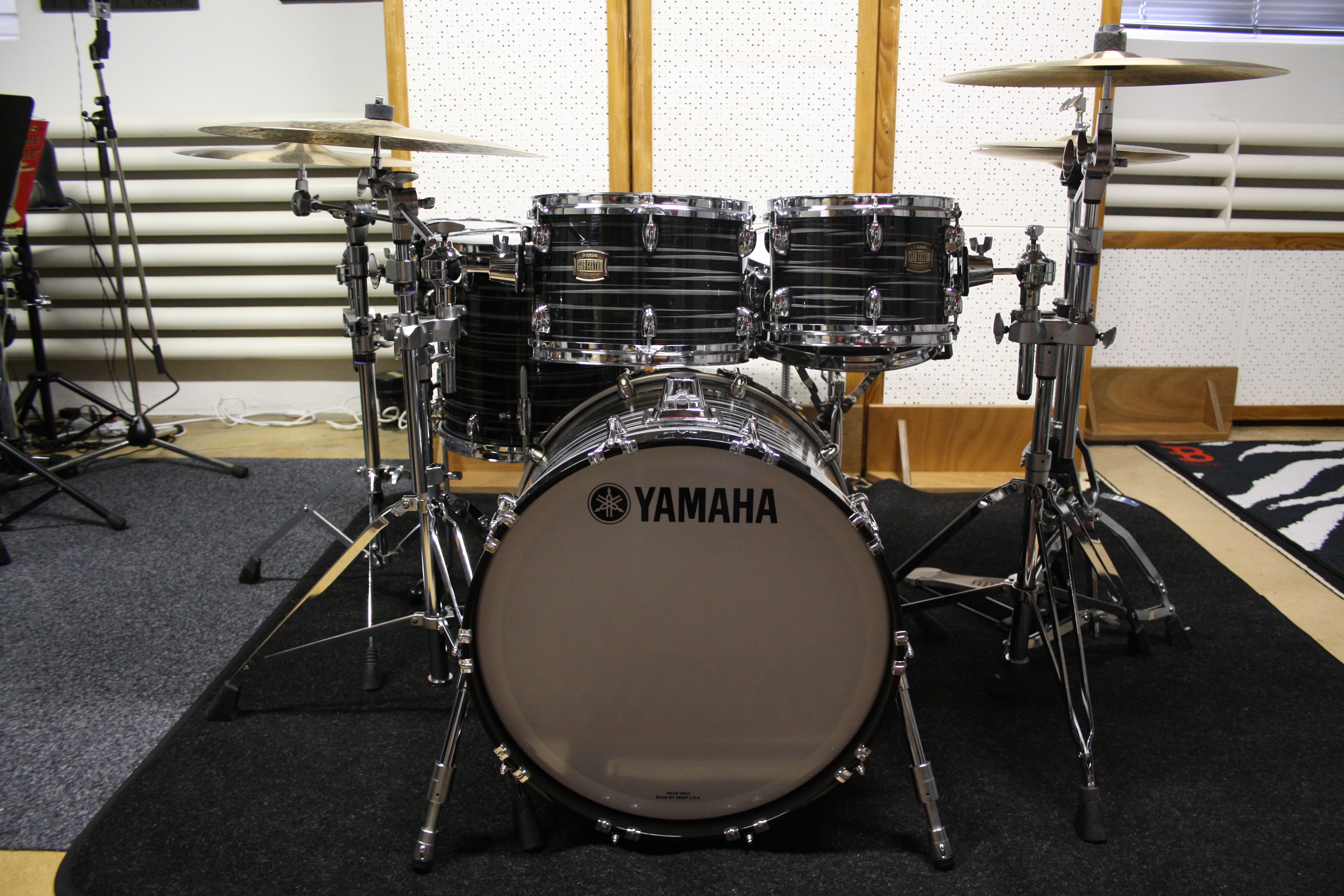
Yamaha Drumset

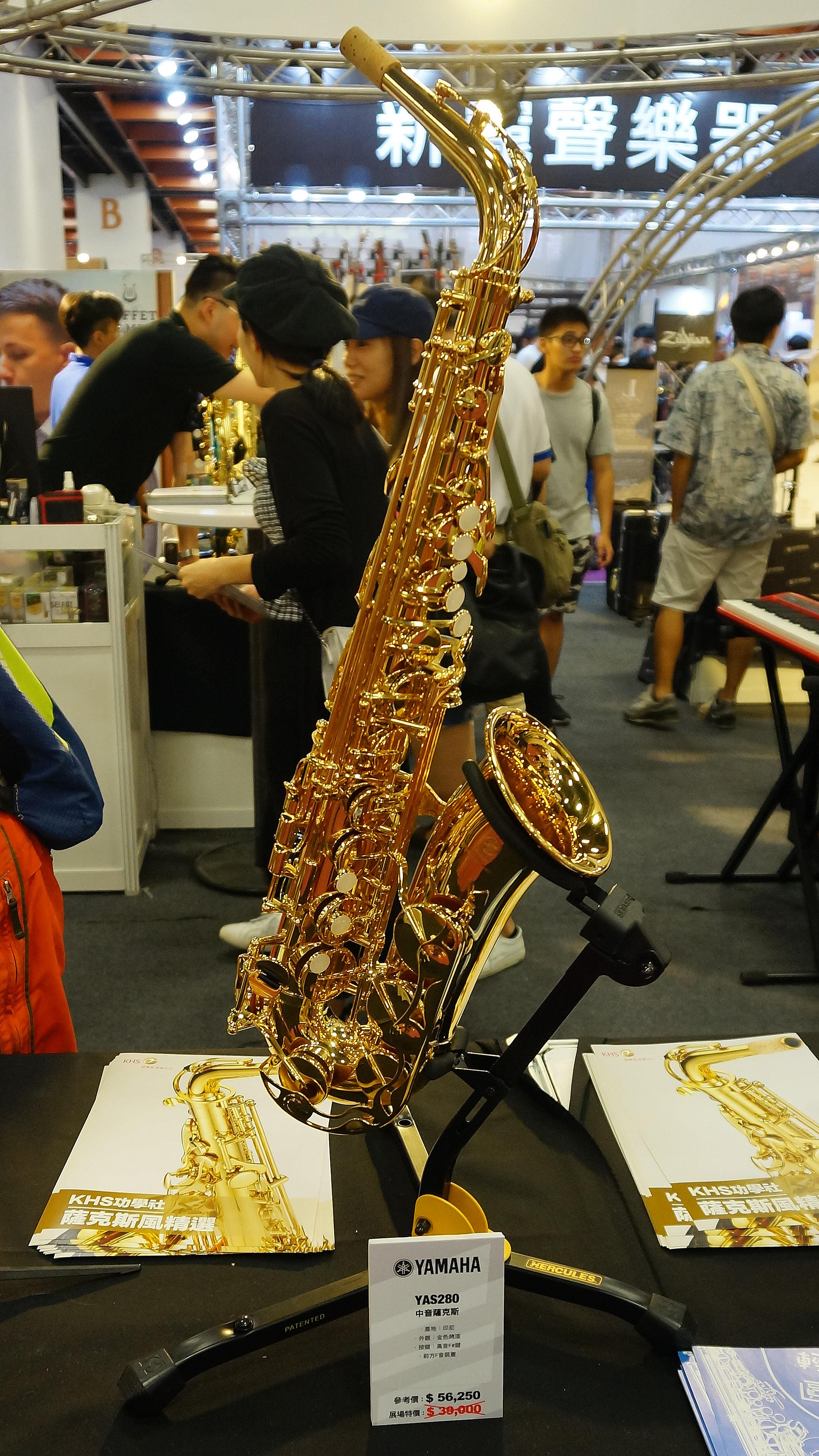
Yamaha Alto Saxophone

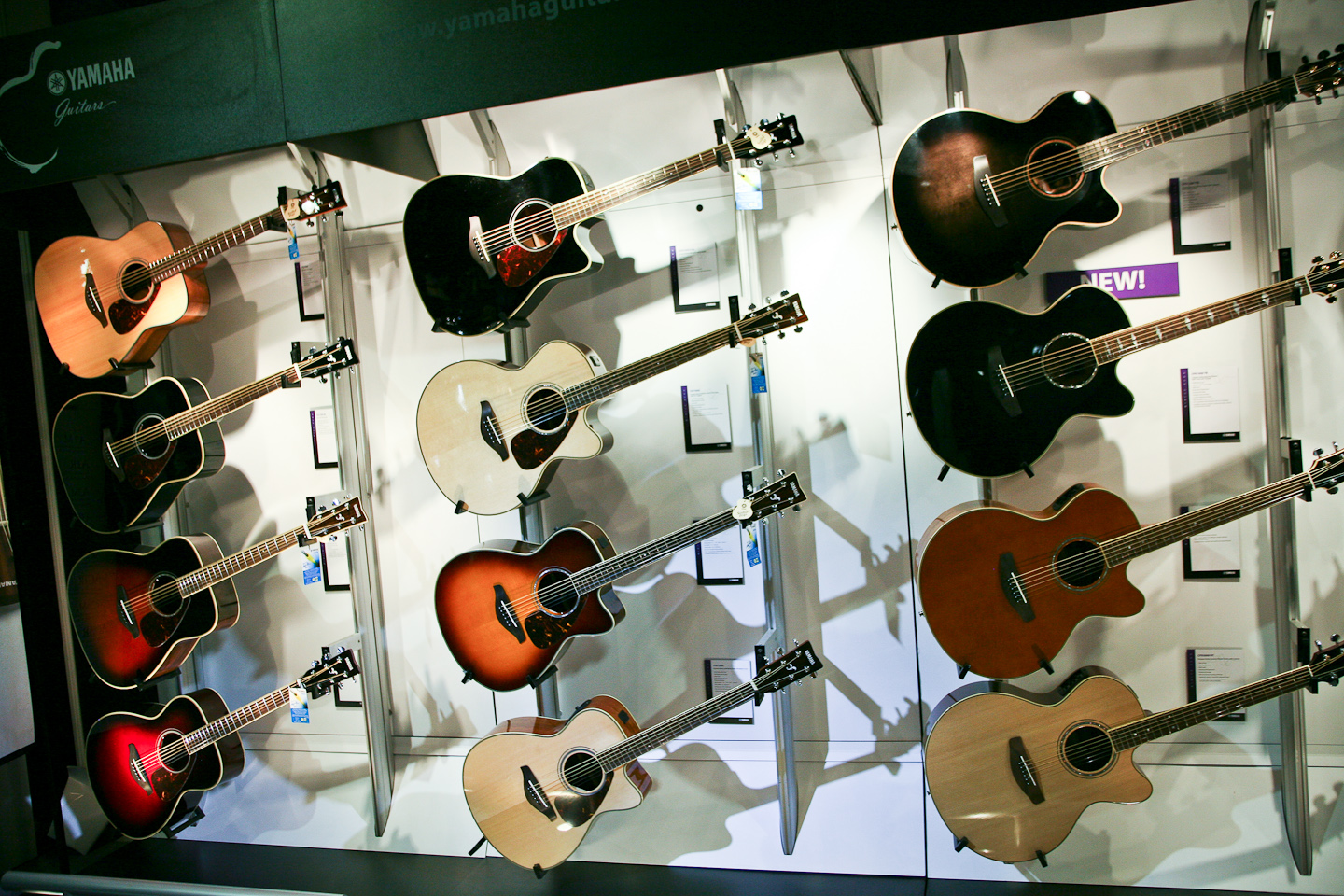
A collection of Yamaha Guitars

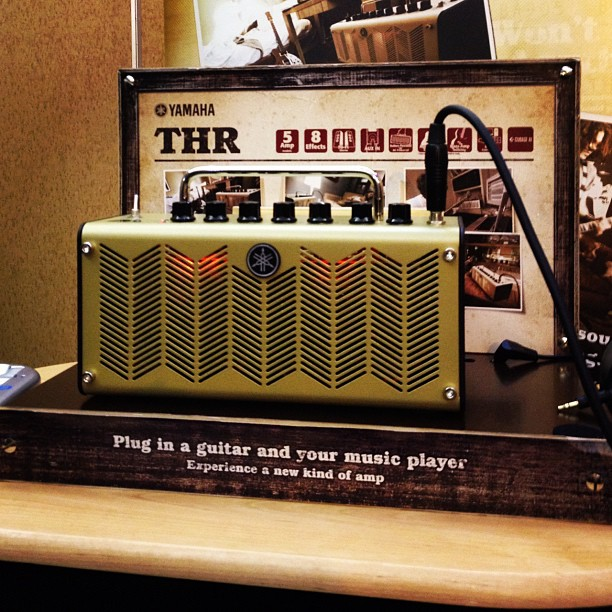
Yamaha Acoustic Guitar Amp

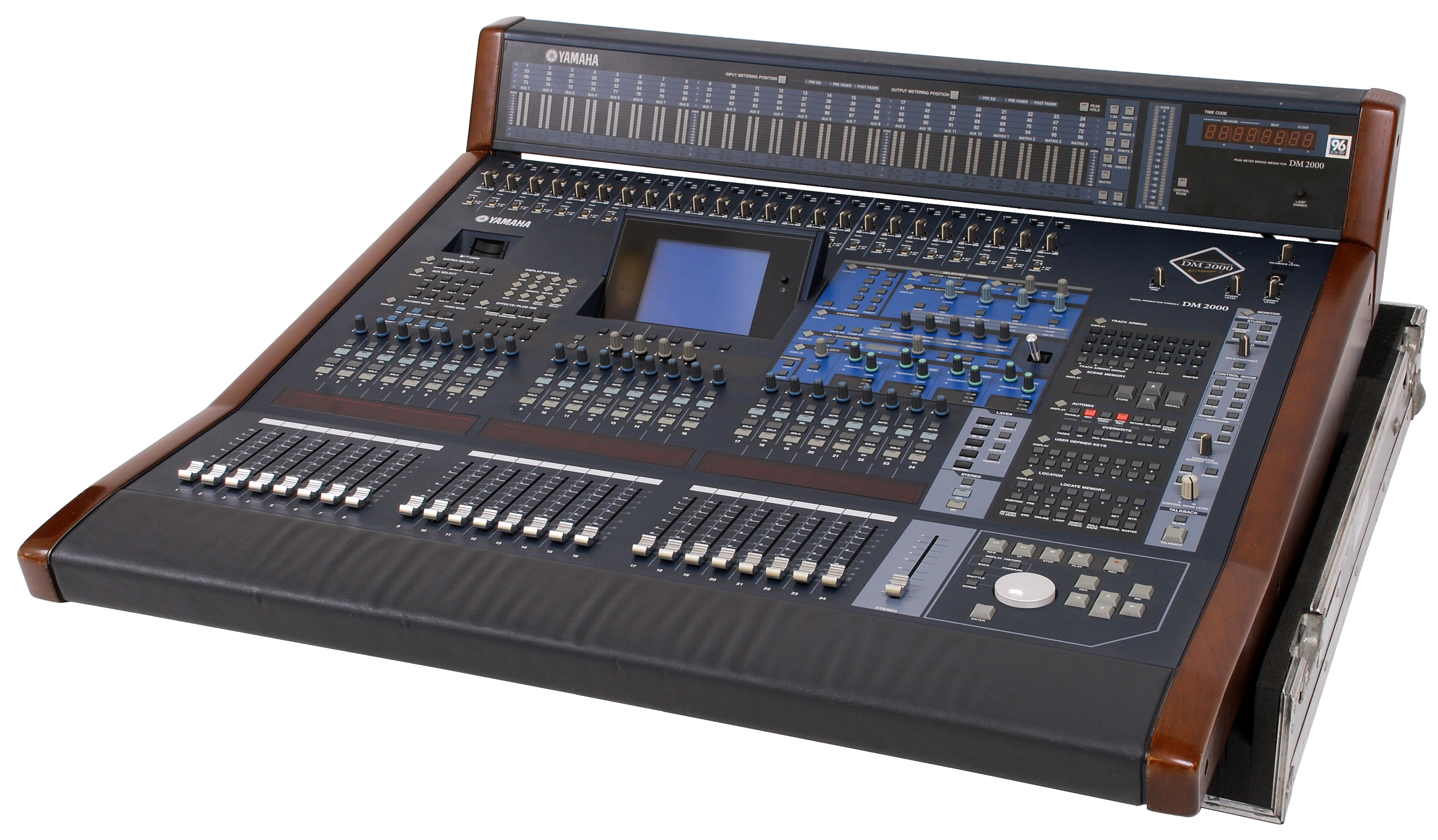
Yamaha Mixing Console

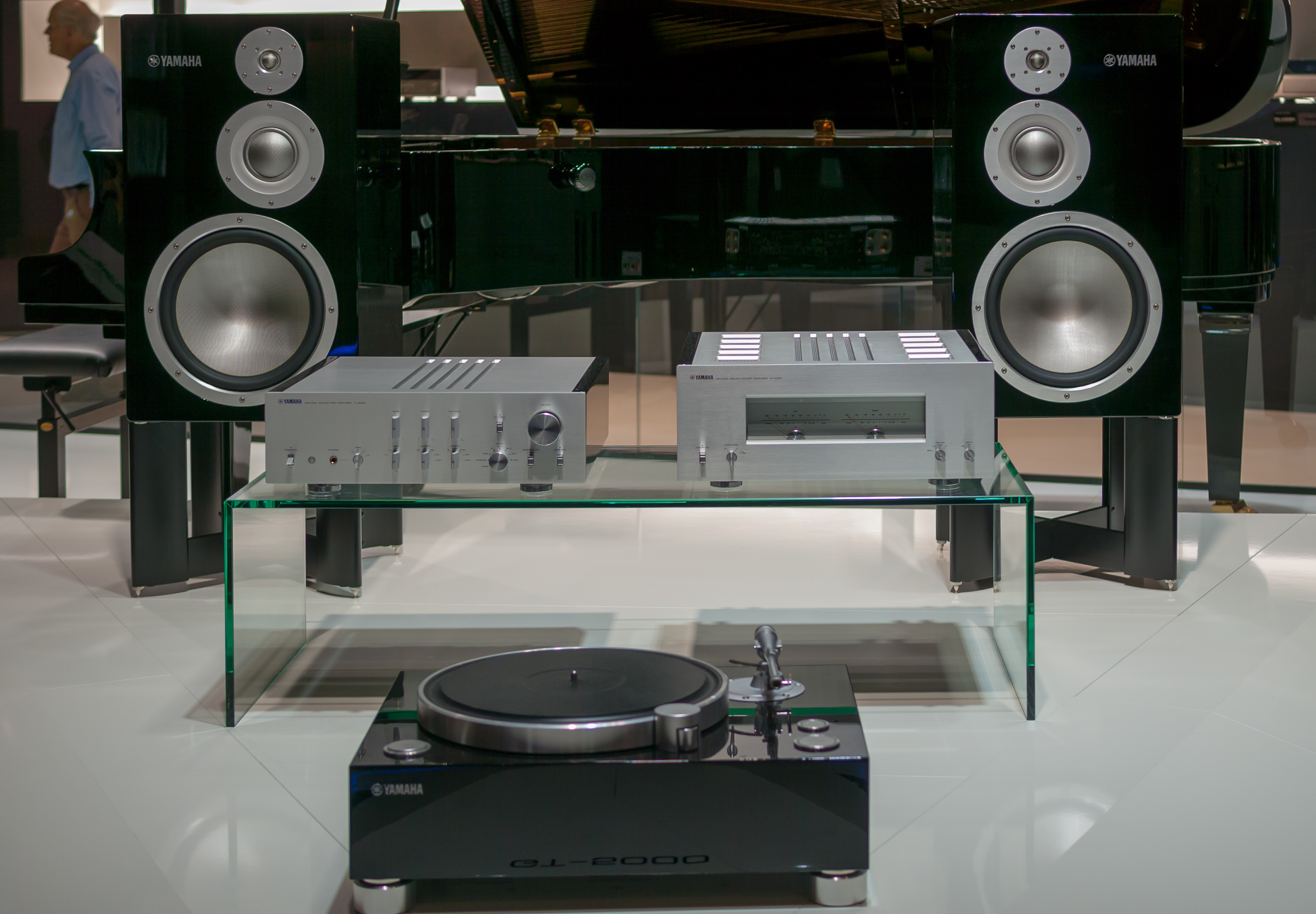
Yamaha Hi-Fi

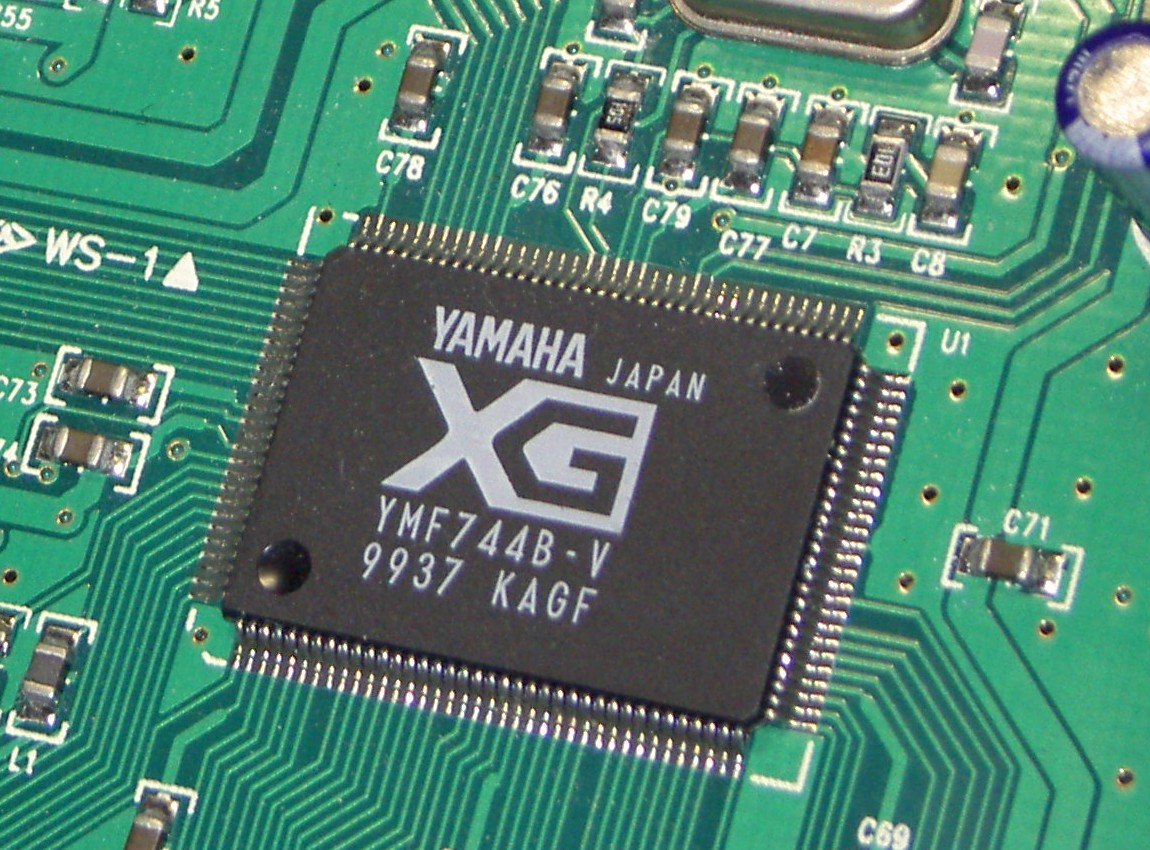
Yamaha Sound Chip

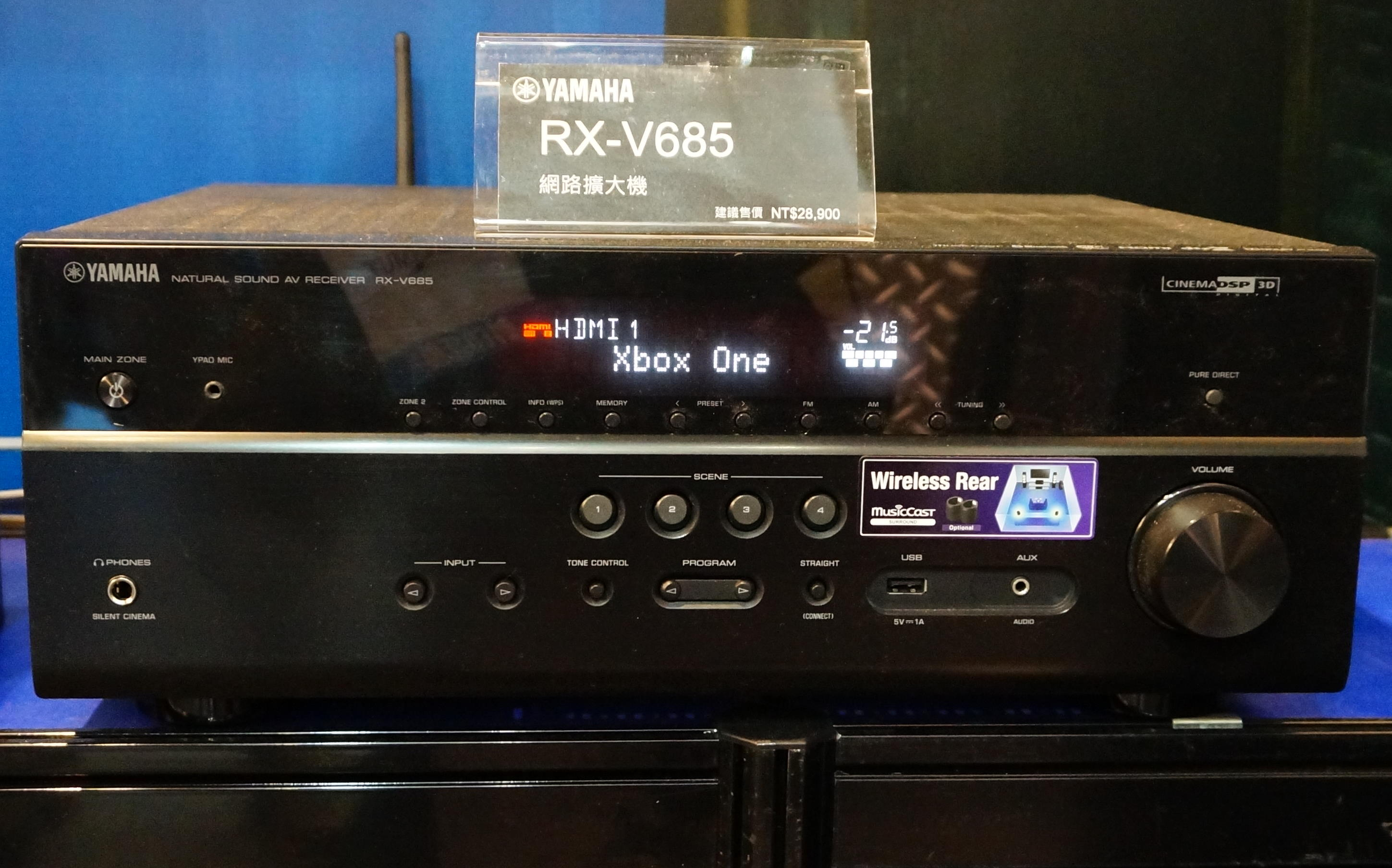
Yamaha AV Receiver

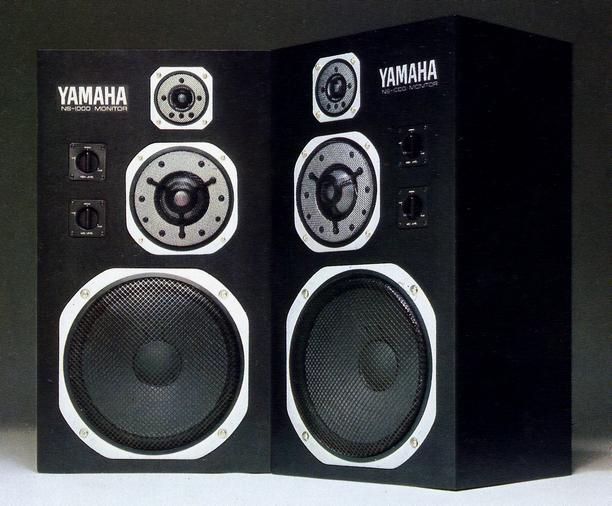
Yamaha Speakers

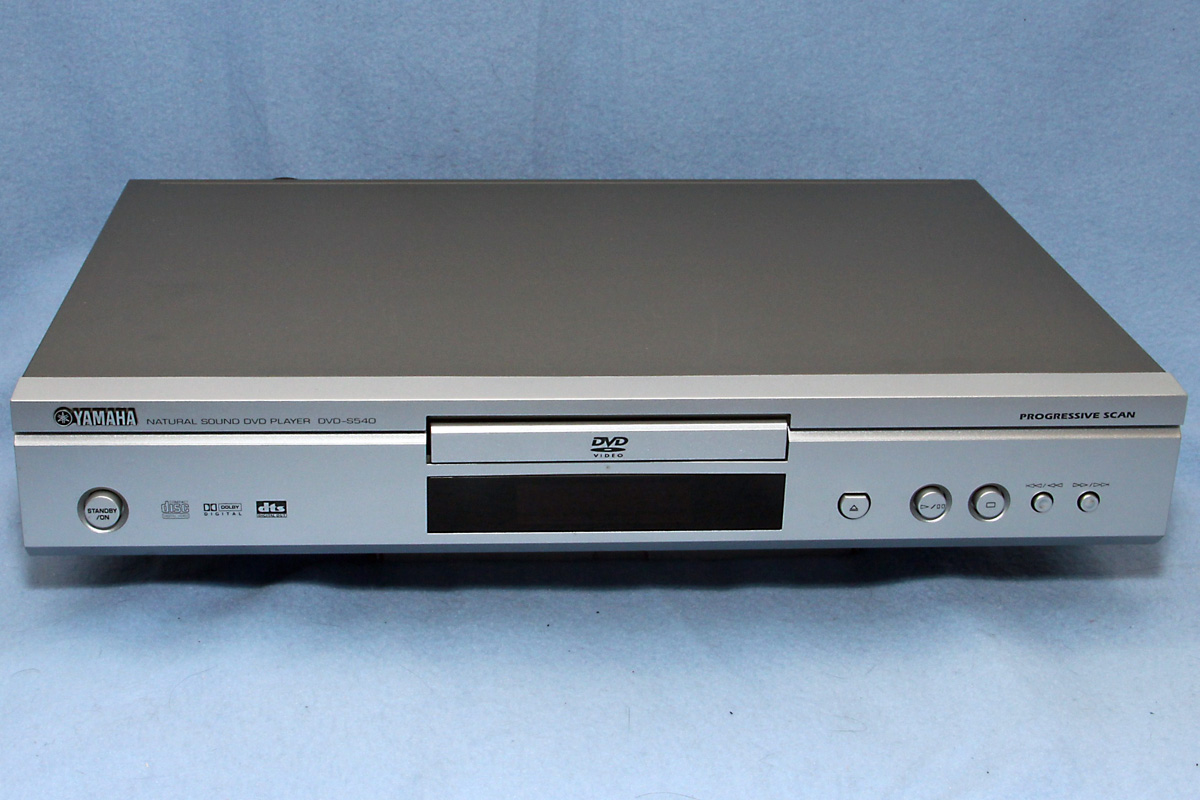
Yamaha DVD Player

=== Synthesizers and samplers ===
Yamaha announced the singing synthesizer Vocaloid for the first time at the German fair Musikmesse on 5–9 March 2003.

Yamaha began the sale and production of Vocaloid applications, starting with Lily which was later sold via Internet Co., Ltd.'s website. Their involvement continued with the VY series, with VY1 being the first, released in deluxe and standard editions on 1 September 2010. The VY series is designed to be a high quality product for professional musicians. The series is also designed with the intention to set a new standard for the Vocaloids for having no face, sex, or set voice, but are designed to complete any song. VY1 has a new approach to how the software handled the database of samples and improved the performance of the Vocaloid 2 engine.

Yamaha announced a version of the Vocaloid 2 software for the iPhone and iPad, which was exhibited at the Y2 Autumn 2010 Digital Content Expo in Japan. Later, this version of the software was released using the VY1 voice. VY2 was also released for this version of the software.

== Factory locations ==
In Japan, the company maintains three factories for musical instrument manufacture, engine and various vehicle manufacture (motorcycles and marine products), with all factories located in Shizuoka Prefecture.

- Kakegawa Factory
  - 1480, Ryoke, Kakegawa-shi, Shizuoka
- Toyooka Factory
  - 203, Matsunokijima, Iwata-shi, Shizuoka
- Tenryu Factory
  - 283, Aoyacho, Minami-ku Hamamatsu-shi, Shizuoka

== Sports teams ==
- Yamaha Jubilo—Rugby
- Júbilo Iwata—Football

== See also ==
- List of phonograph manufacturers
- List of studio monitor manufacturers
- Yamaha Motor Company
- Yamaha Pro Audio
- mLAN
- Yamaha XG
