= As Long as You Want This =

As Long As You Want This

Studio album by Kane
- Released: 28 January 2000
- Recorded: Wisseloord Studios, Hilversum, Netherlands
- Genre: Alternative rock
- Length: 61:51
- Label: RCA / BMG
- Producer: Slok & Smits & Dinand Woesthoff

Kane chronology
As Long As You Want This (2000)	So Glad You Made It (2001)

Singles from As Long As You Want This
- 1. "Where Do I Go Now" Released: 1999; 2. "Damn Those Eyes" Released: 1999; 3. "I Will Keep My Head Down" Released: 2000; 4. "Can You Handle Me" Released: 2000

As Long As You Want This is the first studio album by the Dutch rock band Kane, released in 2000.

== Production ==
In 1999, Kane released the single "Where Do I Go Now", before recording the album. The song became a minor hit thanks to the video channel TMF and the radion station 3FM. In October 1999, the band recorded As Long As You Want This at the Wisseloord Studios in Hilversum and Studio Arnold Mühren in Volendam. The record was produced by Haro Slok and Henk Jan Smits, together with Kane vocalist Dinand Woesthoff.

== Reception ==
The single "Where Do I Go Now" peaked at #29 on the Dutch Top 40, and the album reached #2 on the Dutch Album Top 100, selling 40,000 copies in its first two months. 250,000 copies were eventually sold in the Netherlands, certifying the record 2× Platinum. In 2001, the band received an Edison award for As Long As You Want This.

== Track listing ==
All tracks are written by Dinand Woesthoff, except where noted.

No.	Title	Music	Length
1.	"As Long As You Want This"	Dennis van Leeuwen & Dinand Woesthoff	3:57
2.	"Can You Handle Me"		3:17
3.	"Damn Those Eyes"		4:49
4.	"Hands"	van Leeuwen & Woesthoff	4:52
5.	"Where Do I Go Now"	van Leeuwen & Woesthoff	4:13
6.	"I Will Keep My Head Down"		5:06
7.	"Not Here"	van Leeuwen & Woesthoff	4:11
8.	"Waiting, Waiting"		4:46
9.	"Rescue Me"	van Leeuwen & Woesthoff	4:46
10.	"Until Nothing Else Matters"		3:52
11.	"Just Go"		3:30
12.	"My Hearts Desire"		4:22
13.	"Taurus (Hanging On)"	Alex Geurink, Freek Wennekes & Woesthoff	5:30

== Personnel ==
Adapted from the album liner notes.

Kane

- Tony Cornelissen – guitars, background vocals
- Cyril Directie – drums, percussion
- Aram Kersbergen – bass guitar
- Dennis van Leeuwen – guitars
- Dinand Woesthoff – lead vocals, guitars

Additional musicians

- Hans Eijkenaar — drums
- Tjeerd Van Zanen — guitars
- Nico Brandsen — hammond organ
- Jan Teksta — backing vocals
- Lodewijk Van Gorp;— backing vocals
- Simone Roerade — backing vocals
- Derdre Twist — backing vocals
- A.P.C De Ruiter — first violin
- E.A. Korthals Altes — violin
- P. Terlouw - violin
- C.F.W. Dumessie — violin
- M.H. Honingh — viola
- J.A. Jowett — viola
- A. Versloot — viola
- A. Davidson — cello
- O. Groesz — cello
- E. Winkelman — double bass
- Marcel Doesburg — didgeridoo
- Haro Slok — wurlitzer, synthesizer, shakes
- Henk Jan Smits — supershakes
- Tom Bakker – string arrangements

Production

- Haro Slok — co-producer
- Henk Jan Smits — co-producer
- Dinand Woesthoff — co-producer
- Ronald Prent — co-mixer
- Tom Janssen — co-mixer
- René Schardt — mastering
- Patrick Mühren — recording engineer
- Tjeerd Van Zanen — recording engineer
- Tijmen Zinkhaan — recording engineer
