= Bas Bron =

Dutch music producer (born 1974)

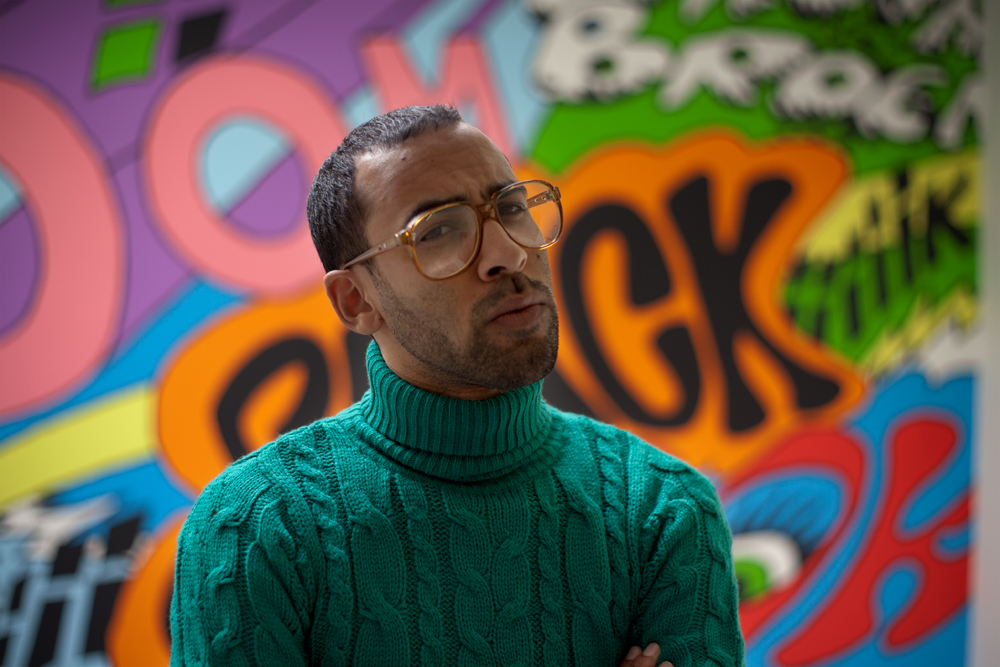
- Bron in 2011

Background information
- Also known as: Bastian, Dubbel B, Fatima Yamaha, Gifted, Majoor Vlosshart: de Neger Des Heils, Seymour Bits
- Born: 17 July 1974 (age 52); Amsterdam, Netherlands
- Genres: Electrofunk, electropop
- Occupations: DJ, producer
- Years active: 1996–present
- Website: bastianmusic.com

Bas Bron (born 17 July 1974) is a Dutch musical artist and a producer of mostly electronic music from Amsterdam.

== Bastian ==
As Bastian, Bas Bron scored a modest national hit in 2001 with the song "You've Got My Love", which was accompanied by a music video showing the song's lyrics on shirts worn by dancing women, showing only their upper chest. The song reached #17 in the Dutch Top 40. Later in 2001 the debut album Ready was released, filled with electrofunk and electropop-influenced music enhanced with Commodore 64 sound effects. Two years later the second album It's All Downhill From Here came out. The title referred to the buildup of the album; the theme of the songs would gradually become darker and heavier. In 2007, he released the album IV. The name of the title refers to the fact that all songs on the album are exactly 4 minutes in length.

Live, Bastian performs as a band rather than a solo artist, with the band currently consisting of 8 members.

== Seymour Bits ==
After two EPs, Bas Bron released the album The Booty Pop Phantom under the pseudonym Seymour Bits in 2006. The electrofunk album, quoted as reminding of Prince by several critics, was generally well received. Bron made up a fake persona of Seymour Bits, a 23-year-old computer programmer named Seymour Jackson who traveled to Zanzibar and Tanzania to pursue his dream of making electronic music. In 2010, he released the self-titled album Seymour Bits.

== Comtron ==
Together with drummer Rimer Veeman, Bas Bron forms the group Comtron. The duo was formed in 2002, posing as higher management of a big evil stock trading cooperation, rich but disillusioned by the corporate world. This theme can be found in most of their songs as well; dark, heavy, electric funk. In 2002 and 2003, Comtron released two underground 12-inch singles. Their full-length debut album Follow The Money was released in 2007 by Rush Hour Recordings.

== Other aliases and activities ==
Bas Bron has also released music under the pseudonyms Fatima Yamaha and Gifted.

He is a singer and the main producer in hip hop and R&B group 'De Jeugd van Tegenwoordig', who had international success with their single "Watskeburt". Occasionally he performs with the Spaarndammerbuurtkliek as rapper 'Dubbel B' or as 'Majoor Vlosshart: de Neger Des Heils', as well as producing for the group. He also appeared on rapper Brainpower's second album Verschil Moet Er Zijn.

In 2005, he started the music label Magnetron Music.

== Discography ==
=== Bastian ===
==== Albums ====
- Ready (2001)
- It's All Downhill From Here (2003)
- IV (2007)
- There's No Such Place (2011)

==== Singles ====
- You've Got My Love (2000, 12" vinyl)
- You've Got My Love (2001, CD single)
- Anything (2001)
- Love Is Incredible (2001)
- Paper Love (2003, 12" vinyl)
- Paper Love (2003, CD single)
- Downers (2003)
- Flight of the Starglider (2004)
- Sturdy (2007)

=== Seymour Bits ===
==== EPs ====
- Hit Me with Technology (2004)
- Bonparapara Attack! (2005)

==== Albums ====
- The Booty Pop Phantom (2006)
- Seymour Bits (2010)

=== Comtron ===
==== Albums ====
- Follow The Money (2007)

=== Fatima Yamaha ===
==== EPs ====
- A Girl Between Two Worlds (2004/2015)
- What's A Girl To Do (2010)
- Araya (2017)

==== Albums ====
- Imaginary Lines (2015)
- Spontaneous Order (2020)
- Onzichtbaar (2023)

=== Gifted ===
==== EPs and singles ====
- Positive Contact (1996)
- Lost (2002)

==== Albums ====
- Held Back By Inferior Technology (2002)

=== Tour (2021) ===
- Dates (1)

| Date | Ville | Pays | Lieu |
|---|---|---|---|
| 19 November 2021 | Paris | France | Cabaret Sauvage |
