= Kane (Dutch band) =

Dutch rock band

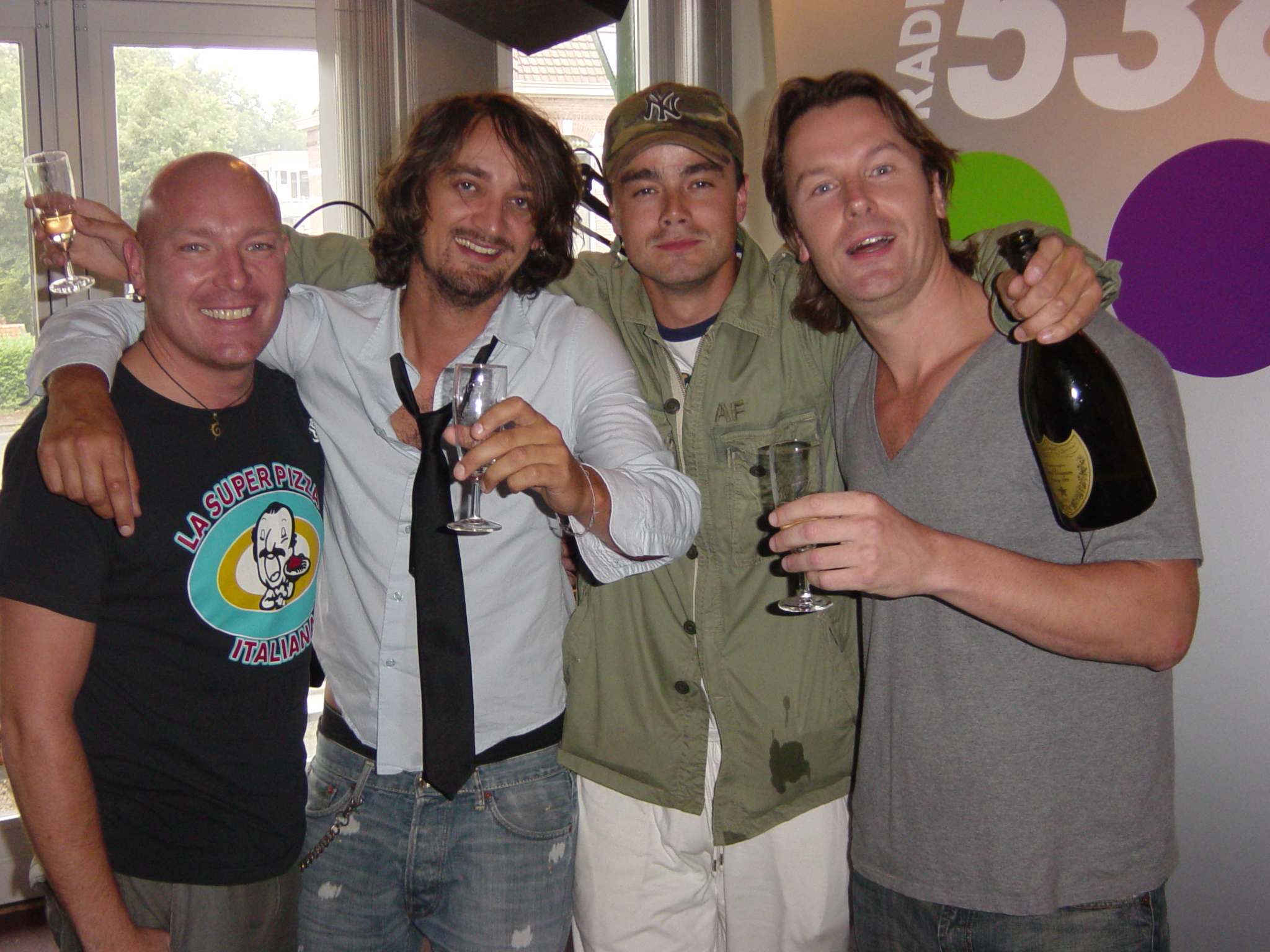
- Kane in 2005

Background information
- Origin: The Hague, Netherlands
- Genres: Rock; post-grunge
- Years active: 1998–2014, 2023–2025
- Labels: BMG; Ariola
- Past members: List of former members
- Website: kaneofficial.nl

Kane was a Dutch rock band formed in 1998 in the Hague. Its final lineup consisted of Dinand Woesthoff (lead vocals) and Dennis van Leeuwen (guitar), who were the sole consistent members.

At the beginning of the 2000s, Kane was seen as the biggest Dutch rock band. They achieved three number-one singles on the Dutch Top 40 and three number-one albums on the Dutch Albums Chart.

The group disbanded in 2014. In 2023, they released their first song in a decade and announced five reunion concerts for June 2024, which all sold out. After two farewell shows in October 2025, the band's reunion ended.

== History ==
=== Beginnings and breakthrough ===
Kane got its start in the Hague in 1998. Dinand Woesthoff and Dennis van Leeuwen met at a Scheveningen cafe, where they were both working at the time. Both had a passion for music, and they formed a band named Citizen Kane, after the eponymous movie, and began putting on performances for small audiences. They were eventually discovered at a Hague cafe named De Paap by talent scout Henkjan Smits, who introduced them to manager Edwin Jansen and helped them sign a recording contract with BMG. With their name abbreviated to Kane, the band rounded out the lineup with guitarist Tony Cornelissen, bassist Aram Kersbergen, and drummer Cyril Directie.

Their breakthrough came in 1999, with the song "Where Do I Go Now". Their debut album, As Long as You Want This, was released a year later and eventually certified 2× Platinum. It remained on the Dutch Album Chart for 105 weeks and peaked at No. 2. Kane won the 2000 MTV Europe Music Award for Best Dutch Act, beating Anouk, BLØF, and Krezip. In November 2000, the band performed a U2 cover set for the Marlboro Flashbacks tour, which was released on a live album named With or Without You.

Their second album, So Glad You Made It, saw the band attempt an international crossover, with releases in various European countries. They issued the title track as the lead single, together with a video that had to be censored on MTV for partial nudity. The album's third single, "Rain Down on Me", become Kane's "biggest crowd favourite". It also reached No. 38 on the UK singles chart, and the Tiësto remix was featured on the soundtrack to the video game FIFA Football 2004.

On 28 June 2003, Kane became the first Dutch rock band to perform at the Amsterdam ArenA, where they sold over 26,000 tickets. Ilse DeLange performed as the opener, and DJ Tiësto played at the afterparty.

=== Tragedy, further success, and breakup ===
In 2004, Woesthoff's wife, Guusje Nederhorst, died of breast cancer at the age of 34. He devoted the song "Dreamer" to her, and it became the best-selling Dutch single that year.

"Something to Say", the lead single to the band's fourth album, Fearless (2005), became their first number-one hit on the Dutch Top 40. In August 2005, Kane scored their second number-one hit, with the title track "Fearless", which was dedicated to Woesthoff's cousin, who was suffering from kidney disease.

Three years later, Kane premiered the song "Catwalk Criminal" on New Year's Day 2008 at the Erasmusbrug in Rotterdam. It was the lead single to their fifth album, Everything You Want, which was recorded in several international cities. The track "Shot of a Gun" became the Kane's third number-one single. On 28 June 2008, the band played the largest show of their career at De Kuip in Rotterdam, in front of 42,000 people.

Kane's sixth album, No Surrender, was released on 27 November 2009. The title track was the lead single and reached No. 3 on the Dutch Top 40. It was also performed live with actress Carice van Houten in January 2010 on a televised broadcast to raise money in relief of the Haiti earthquake. The band's seventh album, Come Together, released in 2012, had been planned to come out in 2011, but it was postponed due to the success of their greatest hits album, Singles Only.

In September 2013, Kane announced that they would stop touring for the time being. On 27 December 2014, the band announced that they were breaking up, after 16 years together. In a statement on their website, the band wrote: "We said what we wanted to say, longer than we dared to predict, with more support than we ever hoped to dream. Honoring the fire, it's time to close the book."

=== Return and second breakup ===
In September 2023, Kane announced plans to reform the following year. They sold out five reunion shows at the Ziggo Dome in Amsterdam in what was billed as the "reCONNECT" concerts, for June 2024. The band also released a single, "What Are You Waiting For?", on 26 September, their first new song in ten years. This was followed by another single in December, "War Ends Today", which is a protest song against "the Gaza War", with proceeds donated to Save the Children in Palestine.

In March 2025, Kane announced that they would break up again after two goodbye shows. They stated that the singles were part of a new album, Exit & Entrances, which was released on 19 September, their first record in 13 years. They performed at the 1,500-capacity Paradiso in Amsterdam on 17 September, followed by two farewell shows at the Rotterdam Ahoy, on 17 and 18 October.

== Music and reception ==
Kane's style of rock music has been described as post-grunge with a notable U2 influence. AllMusic once compared their sound to Matchbox Twenty. Alongside the success of Anouk and Di-rect, Kane's popularity in the 1990s helped make the Hague the center of Dutch popular music for the first time since the 1960s.

Despite their commercial success, Kane received poor reviews from music critics, who disliked the band's "bloated rock" sound and Woesthoff's "growling" vocals. Woesthoff was also seen as arrogant and difficult to work with, given that the band has had 19 former members. Some ex-members have spoken out against the atmosphere and power structure within the group. Referring to their reputation, Woesthoff has said, "Don't let yourself get worked up and just do your thing". De Volkskrant compared Kane to a Dutch version of the Canadian rock band Nickelback in terms of their reputation.

== Band members ==
Final lineup

- Dinand Woesthoff – vocals (1998–2013, 2023–2025)
- Dennis van Leeuwen – guitar (1998–2013, 2023–2025)

Past

- Tony Cornelissen – guitars, background vocals
- Cyril Directie – drums, percussion
- Aram Kersbergen – bass guitar
- André Kemp – drums
- Martijn Bosman – drums
- Paul Jan Bakker – guitar
- Matto Kranenburg – bass guitar
- Dion Murdock – bass guitar
- Yolanda Charles – bass guitar
- Robin Berlin – guitar
- Joost Kroon – drums
- Ivo Severijns – bass
- Nico Brandsen – keyboards

== Discography ==
=== Studio albums ===
Title	Album details	Peak chart positions		Certifications
Title	Album details	NL	BEL	Certifications
As Long as You Want This	Released: 28 January 2000; Label: RCA; Formats: CD	2	—	NL: 2× Platinum
So Glad You Made It	Released: 30 October 2001; Label: RCA; Formats: CD	2	—	NL: Platinum
What If	Released: 17 June 2003; Label: RCA; Formats: CD	1	24	NL: Gold
Fearless	Released: 23 May 2005; Label: RCA; Formats: CD	1	9	NL: Platinum
Everything You Want (nl)	Released: 9 May 2008; Label: Universal / KANE; Formats: CD, LP	1	25	NL: Gold
No Surrender	Released: 27 November 2009; Label: Universal / KANE; Formats: CD	2	89	NL: Platinum
Come Together	Released: 23 November 2012; Label: Universal / KANE; Formats: CD, LP	3	64	NL: Gold
Exit & Entrances	Released: 19 September 2025; Label: Sony Music; Formats: Download	—	—	

=== Live albums ===
Title	Album details	Peak chart positions		Certifications
Title	Album details	NL	BEL	Certifications
With or Without You	Released: December 2000; Label: RCA; Formats: CD, DVD	22	—	NL: Gold
Live in Rotterdam	Released: 2003; Label: BMG; Formats: DVD	—	—	
February	Released: 3 May 2004; Label: RCA; Formats: CD, DVD	2	—	
Live 05	Released: 2005; Label: BMG; Formats: CD, DVD	—	—	
De Kuip Live	Released: December 2008; Label: Universal; Formats: CD, DVD	21	—	
Live in Ahoy	Released: 29 May 2026; Label: Music on Vinyl; Formats: LP	15	199	

=== Compilations ===
Title	Album details	Peak chart positions	Certifications
Title	Album details	NL	Certifications
Singles Only	Released: 11 March 2011; Label: Universal / KANE; Formats: CD, LP	2	

=== Singles ===
List of singles, with selected chart positions and certifications, showing year released and album name
Single	Year	Peak chart positions				Certifications	Album
Single	Year	Dutch Top 40	Single Top 100	BEL	UK	Certifications	Album
"Where Do I Go Now"	1999	29	45	—	—		As Long as You Want This
"Damn Those Eyes"	1999	26	30	—	—		As Long as You Want This
"I Will Keep My Head Down"	2000	12	20	—	—		As Long as You Want This
"Can You Handle Me"	2000	10	45	—	—		As Long as You Want This
"So Glad You Made It"	2001	4	7	—	—		So Glad You Made It
"Let It Be"	2001	10	17	—	—		So Glad You Made It
"Rain Down on Me"	2002	14	29	—	38		So Glad You Made It
"Hold on to the World"	2002	25	19	—	—		So Glad You Made It
"My Best Wasn't Good Enough"	2003	5	3	—	—		What If
"Before You Let Me Go" (with Ilse DeLange)	2003	4	3	—	—		What If
"Rain Down on Me (Tiësto Remix)"	2003	6	3	1	—		What If
"Dreamer (Gussie's Song)" (Dinand Woesthoff)	2004	1	1	—	—		Fearless
"Can You Handle Me"	2004	—	—	52	—		What If
"Something to Say"	2005	1	1	33	—		Fearless
"Fearless"	2005	1	1	57	—		Fearless
"All I Can Do"	2005	12	9	59	—		Fearless
"Believe It"	2006	4	4	58	—		Fearless
"Catwalk Criminal"	2008	4	2	—	—		Everything You Want
"Shot of a Gun"	2008	1	2	52	—		Everything You Want
"Wanna Make It Happen"	2008	34	—	—	—		Everything You Want
"It's London Calling"	2008	10	25	—	—		Everything You Want
"No Surrender"	2009	3	1	—	—		No Surrender
"No Surrender (Live)" (with Carice van Houten)	2010	3	1	—	—		No Surrender
"Love Over Healing"	2010	20	26	—	—		No Surrender
"In Over My Head"	2010	27	43	—	—		No Surrender
"Scream"	2010	50	—	—	—		No Surrender
"High Places" (with Ilse DeLange)	2010	13	12	—	—		No Surrender
"Come Together"	2012	16	12	79	—		Come Together
"I Love This City"	2013	31	68	93	—		Come Together
"First Crash Overthrow"	2013	—	96	—	—		Come Together
"What Are You Waiting For?"	2023	33	—	—	—		Exit & Entrances
"War Ends Today"	2023	—	—	—	—		Exit & Entrances
"What If I Want You Now"	2024	—	—	—	—		Exit & Entrances
"—" denotes single that did not chart or was not released

=== Other charted songs ===
Song	Year	Dutch Top 40	Album
"My Heart's Desire"	2004	69	February
