= Luie Hond =

Dutch reggae and ska band

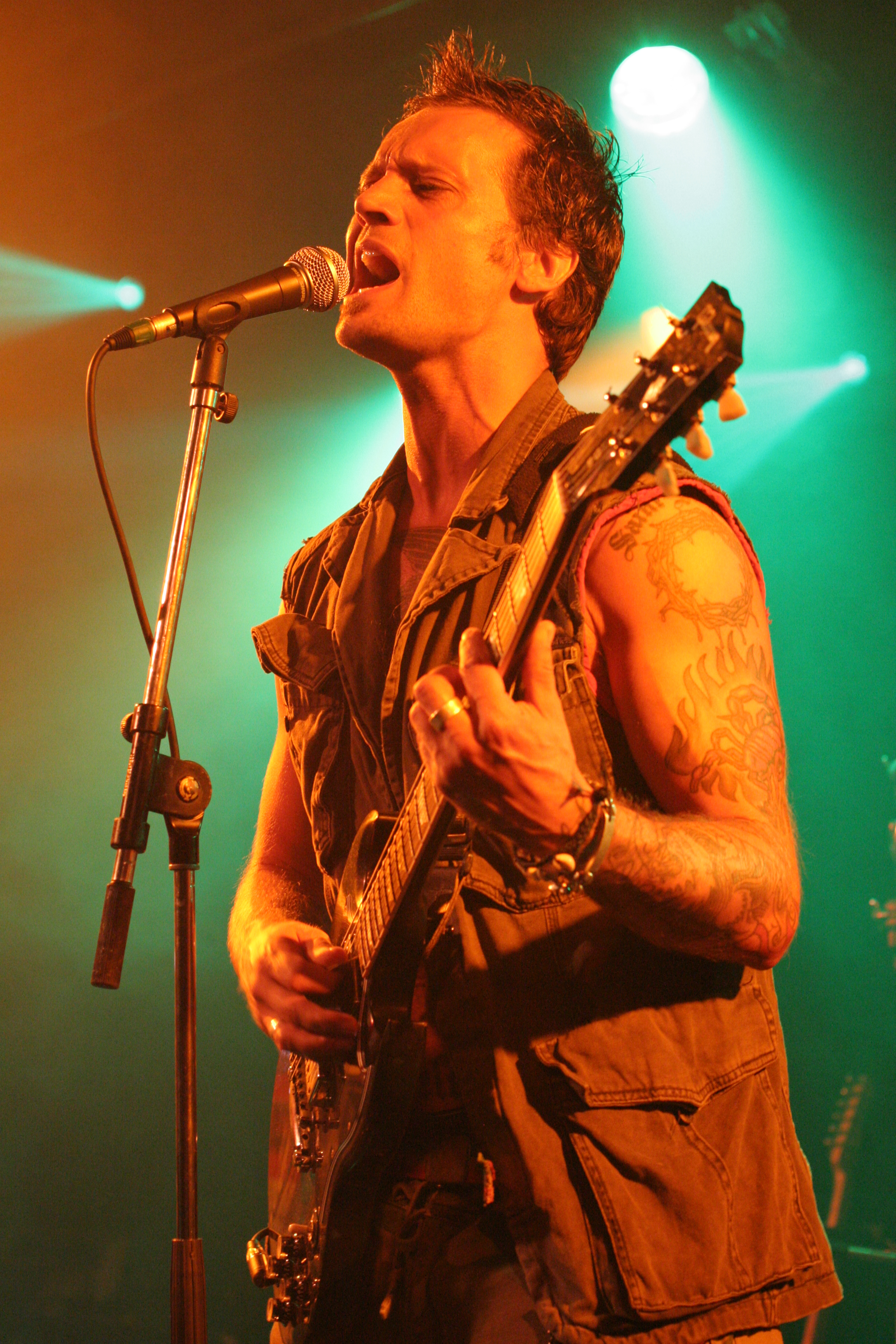
Luie Hond

Luie Hond (Dutch pronunciation: [ˈlœyə ˈɦɔnt]; "Lazy Dog") was a Dutch reggae and ska band from Leeuwarden, founded in the summer of 1997 and active until December 2007.

After being a regional success, the band became nationally known in 1999, when the popular pop singer Ilse DeLange discovered the group and invited them to do the opening act for her tour. Through the years, they released several singles, before finally releasing their debut album Hier Is... (Here is...) in 2004. In 2006, they released its successor Met Liefde (With Love).

Throughout their existence, the band achieved moderate popularity in the Netherlands, though never the mainstream success they hoped for. Their albums were generally well received, their tours were successful and they frequently appeared on several Dutch and Belgium music festivals, such as Lowlands and Appelpop. Nevertheless, the band quit in October 2007, mainly citing financial problems. Vocalist/Guitarist Joris Mous said in an interview with 3VOOR12/Friesland:

"All kinds of things are going on within a band, but the most important reason is: the money. It is financially very difficult to make ends meet. We tried everything to be able to live off of it, but if you have to conclude after 10 years that you can't, then you have to stop."

After playing three farewell concerts in December 2007, Luie Hond discontinued activities for good.
