= Watskeburt?! =

2005 single by De Jeugd van Tegenwoordig

Single by De Jeugd van Tegenwoordig

from the album Parels voor de zwijnen
- Language: Dutch
- English title: "What's up?!"
- Released: May 16, 2005
- Genre: Hip-Hop; Electronic
- Length: 6:15
- Label: TopNotch
- Producer: Bas Bron

De Jeugd van Tegenwoordig singles chronology
"Watskeburt?!" (2005)	"Voorjekijkendoorlopen" (2005)

Watskeburt?! is a song by the Dutch hip hop group De Jeugd van Tegenwoordig. "Watskeburt" is a contraction of the Dutch sentence "Wat is er gebeurd?" ("What happened?", in the sense of "What's happening?"/"What's up?").

The song was released as a single on 16 May 2005. At first, the song was not very successful, until several radio stations picked it up. The song entered the Dutch Top 40 on 4 June at #8, and the next week rose to #1, where it remained for three weeks. The song was a hit in Belgium as well, peaking at #15 on the Belgium Singles Top 50.

The beat of "Watskeburt?!" was created by Bas Bron, the group's producer. The first verse is done by Vieze Fur, and the second by P. Fabergé.

The single was also released in England. The British DJ Pete Tong played this song on his radio show on 23 January. After that, the management of De Jeugd van Tegenwoordig decided to release it in the UK and Germany.

== Charts ==
=== Weekly charts ===
Chart (2005)	Peak position
Belgium (Ultratop 50 Flanders)	15
Netherlands (Dutch Top 40)	1
Netherlands (Single Top 100)	1

=== Year-end charts ===
Chart (2005)	Position
Belgium (Ultratop Flanders)	51
Netherlands (Dutch Top 40)	9
Netherlands (Single Top 100)	18
