= The Voice of Holland season 8 =

The Voice of Holland
- Season 8
- Hosted by: Martijn Krabbé; Wendy van Dijk; Jamai Loman (backstage)
- Coaches: Waylon; Anouk; Ali B Sanne Hans
- Winner: Jim van der Zee
- Winning coach: Anouk
- Runner-up: Samantha Steenwijk

Release
- Original network: RTL 4
- Original release: 20 October 2017 – 16 February 2018

Season chronology
- ← Previous; Season 7 Next → Season 9

The eighth season of the Dutch reality singing competition The Voice of Holland premiered on 20 October 2017 on RTL 4. Hosts Martijn Krabbé, Wendy van Dijk, and Jamai Loman all returned, as did Sanne Hans, Waylon, and Ali B as coaches, while season 7 coach Guus Meeuwis was replaced with Anouk, who served as a coach on season 6.

New this season was that in the Redroom-app the contestant with the highest percentage of turns could release its blind audition song on iTunes.

Jim van der Zee won the competition from team Anouk and Anouk became the winning mentor for the first time and Jim became the second male to win the show.

== Teams ==
Color key

– Winner
– Runner-up
– Third place
– Fourth place
– Eliminated in the Live Shows

– Eliminated in the Knockout Rounds
– Artist was stolen by another coach (Name is struckthrough)
– Artist was stolen but was later switched with another artist and got eliminated
– Eliminated in the Battle Rounds

| Coaches | Top 59 artists | | | |
|---|---|---|---|---|
| Waylon | | | | |
| Waylon | Kimberly Maasdamme | Silayio | Marchiano Markus | Julia van Bergen |
| Waylon | Simon van Rooij | Kelly Kockelkoren | Tessa Looijen | Silke van de Klundert |
| Waylon | ~~Soraya~~ | Lara Mallo | Maud Nieuwenhuis | Rowan du Chatenier |
| Waylon | Zoë Smit | Jennifer Terwel | Milou Hesselink | Berenice van Leer |
| Sanne Hans | | | | |
| Sanne Hans | Samantha Steenwijk | Aïrto Edmundo | David van Rooij | Sebastiën van Dorp |
| Sanne Hans | Chris Alain | Richelle van Ling | Kira Dekker | Bram Houg |
| Sanne Hans | ~~Silke van de Klundert~~ | Milan Velberg | Robin Smit | Florens Eykemans |
| Sanne Hans | Jaclyn Bradley Palmer | Jeroen Robben | Deborah de Groot | Roemillo Baumgard |
| Ali B | | | | |
| Ali B | Demi van Wijngaarden | Tjindjara | Ronald Klungel | Aïcha Gill |
| Ali B | Pieter van der Zweep | Karlyn | Gin Dutch | Soraya |
| Ali B | ~~Lilly-Jane Young~~ | Valerie Timmermans | Imara Thomas | Bryan Muntslag |
| Ali B | Toon Mentink | Mark Pathuis | Iris de Schepper | Tina Rama |
| Anouk | | | | |
| Anouk | Jim van der Zee | Nienke Wijnhoven | Gideon Luciana | Kevin Fullinck |
| Anouk | Renée de Gruijl | Heavenly | Lilly-Jane Young | ~~Samantha Steenwijk~~ |
| Anouk | Nikita Pellencau | Joy van Keep | Vington | Katharina Wildenbeest |
| Anouk | Noor Akarriou | Cindy Bell | Nina ten Kate | |
Note: Italicized and capitalized names are stolen contestants (names struck through within former teams).

== Blind auditions ==
Color key

| ✔ | Coach hit his/her "I WANT YOU" button |
| | Artist defaulted to this coach's team |
| | Artist elected to join this coach's team |
| | Artist eliminated with no coach pressing his or her "I WANT YOU" button |

=== Episode 1 (October 20) ===
The winners of seasons 5, 6, and 7, O'G3NE, Maan de Steenwinkel, and Pleun Bierbooms respectively, performed "Don't You Worry 'bout a Thing" at the start of the show.

| Order | Artist | Age | Song | Coaches' and contestants' choices | | | |
| Order | Artist | Age | Song | Waylon | Sanne | Ali B | Anouk |
|---|---|---|---|---|---|---|---|
| 1 | Kelly Kockelkoren | 30 | "Do I Ever" | ✔ | ✔ | ✔ | — |
| 2 | Jim van der Zee | 22 | "Amar Pelos Dois" (English version) | ✔ | ✔ | ✔ | ✔ |
| 3 | Bryan Muntslag | 45 | "Kiss and Say Goodbye" | ✔ | — | ✔ | — |
| 4 | Renée Rijpstra | 21 | "Run" | — | — | — | — |
| 5 | Kimberly Maasdamme | 26 | "Hello" | ✔ | ✔ | ✔ | ✔ |
| 6 | Silke van de Klundert | 17 | "Dreamer" | ✔ | ✔ | ✔ | — |
| 7 | Jeremy Hazeleger | 21 | "Hello" | — | — | — | — |
| 8 | Jennifer Terwel | 25 | "Alone" | ✔ | — | — | — |
| 9 | Robin Smit | 23 | "Twilight Zone" | — | ✔ | ✔ | — |
| 10 | Lloyd de Meza | 41 | "Nice & Slow" | — | — | — | — |
| 11 | Tjindjara Metschendorp | 27 | "What About Us" | ✔ | ✔ | ✔ | ✔ |

=== Episode 2 (October 27) ===
| Order | Artist | Age | Song | Coaches' and contestants' choices | | | |
| Order | Artist | Age | Song | Waylon | Sanne | Ali B | Anouk |
|---|---|---|---|---|---|---|---|
| 1 | Axeela | 23 | "Pillowtalk" | — | — | — | — |
| 2 | Renée de Gruijl | 24 | "Mercy on Me" | ✔ | ✔ | ✔ | ✔ |
| 3 | Imara Thomas | 33 | "Skyfall" | — | — | ✔ | — |
| 4 | Antonio Navarro | | "Despacito" | — | — | — | — |
| 5 | Lara Mallo | 28 | "Video Games" | ✔ | ✔ | ✔ | ✔ |
| 6 | Roemillo Baumgard | 18 | "Uptown Funk" | — | ✔ | — | — |
| 7 | Chevelly Cooman | 16 | "Clown" | — | — | — | — |
| 8 | Julia van Bergen | 18 | "2U" | ✔ | ✔ | ✔ | ✔ |
| 9 | David van Rooij | 22 | "Rock with You" | ✔ | ✔ | — | — |
| 10 | Simon van Rooij | 16 | "Slow Hands" | ✔ | — | — | — |
| 11 | Samantha Steenwijk | 31 | "Ik Leef Mijn Eigen Leven" | ✔ | ✔ | ✔ | ✔ |

=== Episode 3 (November 3) ===
| Order | Artist | Age | Song | Coaches' and contestants' choices | | | |
| Order | Artist | Age | Song | Waylon | Sanne | Ali B | Anouk |
|---|---|---|---|---|---|---|---|
| 1 | Chris Alain | 20 | "Remedy" | ✔ | ✔ | ✔ | ✔ |
| 2 | Aïcha Gill | 25 | "Versace on the Floor" | ✔ | ✔ | ✔ | ✔ |
| 3 | Dachel Dominique | 17 | "Man Down" | — | — | — | — |
| 4 | Cindy Bell | 34 | "First Time" | — | — | — | ✔ |
| 5 | Zoë Smit | 21 | "Lost on You" | ✔ | ✔ | ✔ | — |
| 6 | Milan Velberg | 18 | "Can't Stop the Feeling!" | — | ✔ | — | — |
| 7 | Sandor Stürbl | 31 | "Too Much Love Will Kill You" | — | — | — | — |
| 8 | Lilly-Jane Young | 26 | "Don't Look Back in Anger" | — | — | ✔ | — |
| 9 | Silayio | 32 | "The Voice Within" | ✔ | — | — | ✔ |
| 10 | Toon Mentink | 21 | "Catch and Release" | — | ✔ | ✔ | — |
| 11 | Teus van der Linden | 24 | "Stitches" | — | — | — | — |
| 12 | Marchiano Markus | 32 | "Shake Your Body (Down to the Ground)" | ✔ | ✔ | ✔ | ✔ |

=== Episode 4 (November 10) ===
| Order | Artist | Age | Song | Coaches' and contestants' choices | | | |
| Order | Artist | Age | Song | Waylon | Sanne | Ali B | Anouk |
|---|---|---|---|---|---|---|---|
| 1 | Valerie Timmermans | 19 | "One Night Only" | ✔ | — | ✔ | ✔ |
| 2 | Vington | 25 | "The Book of Love" | ✔ | — | — | ✔ |
| 3 | Rose Marin | 17 | "When You Say Nothing At All" | — | — | — | — |
| 4 | Katharina Wildenbeest | 26 | "Mesmerized" | — | — | — | ✔ |
| 5 | Tina Rama | 20 | "Issues" | ✔ | — | ✔ | ✔ |
| 6 | Sebastiën van Dorp | 22 | "Someone Like You" | — | ✔ | — | — |
| 7 | Cassidy Roeks | 21 | "The Edge of Glory" | — | — | — | — |
| 8 | Deborah de Groot | 28 | "Stil in Mij" | ✔ | ✔ | ✔ | — |
| 9 | Maud Nieuwenhuis | 17 | "Flashlight" | ✔ | — | — | — |
| 10 | Remedy | | "Me and My Broken Heart" / "Lonely No More" | — | — | — | — |
| 11 | Gin Dutch | 34 | "I Got You (I Feel Good)" | — | — | ✔ | — |
| 12 | Aïrto | 32 | "Tears" (original song) | ✔ | ✔ | ✔ | ✔ |

=== Episode 5 (November 17) ===
| Order | Artist | Age | Song | Coaches' and contestants' choices | | | |
| Order | Artist | Age | Song | Waylon | Sanne | Ali B | Anouk |
|---|---|---|---|---|---|---|---|
| 1 | Heavenly | 18 | "If I Ain't Got You" | — | — | ✔ | ✔ |
| 2 | Iris de Schepper | 25 | "Kleine Jongen" | — | — | ✔ | — |
| 3 | Kevin Fullinck | 22 | "I Wish" | ✔ | ✔ | — | ✔ |
| 4 | Jaclyn Bradley Palmer | 38 | "These Words" | — | ✔ | — | — |
| 5 | Lindy Kloppenburg | 19 | "Shout Out to My Ex" | — | — | — | — |
| 6 | Nina ten Kate | 20 | "Uprising" | — | ✔ | — | ✔ |
| 7 | Casita | 36 | "One Day I'll Fly Away" | — | — | — | — |
| 8 | Jeroen Robben | 32 | "What a Fool Believes" | ✔ | ✔ | — | — |
| 9 | Soraya | 33 | "If I Were a Boy" | ✔ | — | — | — |
| 10 | ADU | 23 | "Ain't My Fault" | — | — | — | — |
| 11 | Demi van Wijngaarden | 19 | "Still Got the Blues (For You)" | ✔ | ✔ | ✔ | ✔ |

=== Episode 6 (November 24) ===
| Order | Artist | Age | Song | Coaches' and contestants' choices | | | |
| Order | Artist | Age | Song | Waylon | Sanne | Ali B | Anouk |
|---|---|---|---|---|---|---|---|
| 1 | Milou Hesselink | 23 | "Woman" | ✔ | — | ✔ | ✔ |
| 2 | Gideon Luciana | 20 | "The A Team" | — | — | ✔ | ✔ |
| 3 | Aïsha Echteld | 18 | "Unfaithful" | — | — | — | — |
| 4 | Berenice van Leer | 37 | "Teardrops" | ✔ | — | — | — |
| 5 | Tessa Looijen | 23 | "This Is the Last Time" | ✔ | — | ✔ | ✔ |
| 6 | Joy van Keep | 18 | "Nobody's Perfect" | — | — | — | ✔ |
| 7 | Amber Winter | 20 | "Dangerous Woman" | — | — | — | — |
| 8 | Pieter van der Zweep | 28 | "De Waarheid" | ✔ | — | ✔ | — |
| 9 | Karima Lemghari | 43 | "The Boss" | — | — | — | — |
| 10 | Mark Pathuis | 30 | "Het Is Over" | — | — | ✔ | — |
| 11 | Nikita Pellencau | 18 | "Stay" | — | ✔ | ✔ | ✔ |
| 12 | Bram Houg | 22 | "When We Were Young" | ✔ | ✔ | ✔ | ✔ |

=== Episode 7 (December 1) ===
| Order | Artist | Age | Song | Coaches' and contestants' choices | | | |
| Order | Artist | Age | Song | Waylon | Sanne | Ali B | Anouk |
|---|---|---|---|---|---|---|---|
| 1 | Karlyn | 20 | "Mercy" | — | — | ✔ | ✔ |
| 2 | Florens Eykemans | 28 | "Human" | — | ✔ | — | — |
| 3 | Donna Senders | | "Don't Dream It's Over" | — | — | — | — |
| 4 | Richelle van Ling | 19 | "Alles is Liefde" | — | ✔ | — | — |
| 5 | Demi Thomassen | 18 | "One Call Away" | — | — | — | — |
| 6 | Ronald Klungel | 25 | "Scars to Your Beautiful" | ✔ | — | ✔ | ✔ |
| 7 | Noor Akarriou | 16 | "One More Night" | — | — | — | ✔ |
| 8 | Rowan du Chatenier | 21 | "Arms of a Woman" | ✔ | ✔ | — | — |
| 9 | Oes | 28 | "Despacito" (Dutch version) | — | — | — | — |
| 10 | Kira Dekker | 23 | "Family Portrait" | ✔ | ✔ | ✔ | — |
| 11 | Niels Hereijgers | 34 | "Love Me Again" | — | — | — | — |
| 12 | Nienke Wijnhoven | 19 | "The Power of Love" | ✔ | ✔ | ✔ | ✔ |

== The Battle Rounds ==
The Battle Rounds determine which artists from each team will advance to the Knockout Rounds. Two (or a group of three artists) from the same will sing in a vocal battle against one other. The Steal Room was continued from Season 7. While steals have returned, each artist that is stolen this season will sit in a designated seat in the Steal Room as they watch the other performances. If a coach has stolen one artist but later decides to steal another, the first artist will be replaced and eliminated by the newly-stolen artist. Contestants who win their battle or are stolen by another coach will advance to the Knockout rounds.

Color key:

| Artist won the Battle and advanced to the Knockout Rounds |
| Artist lost the Battle and was stolen by another coach, but was later switched with another artist and eliminated |
| Artist lost the Battle but was stolen by another coach and advanced to the Knockout Rounds |
| Artist lost the Battle and was eliminated |

| Episode | Coach | Order | Winner | Song | Loser | 'Steal' result | | | |
| Episode | Coach | Order | Winner | Song | Loser | Waylon | Sanne | Ali B | Anouk |
|---|---|---|---|---|---|---|---|---|---|
| Episode 8 (December 8) | Ali B | 1 | Tjindjara Metschendorp | "She Wolf (Falling to Pieces)" | Tina Rama | — | — | —N/a | — |
| Episode 8 (December 8) | Sanne Hans | 2 | Chris Alain | "If I Ain't Got You" | Roemillo Baumgard | — | —N/a | — | — |
| Episode 8 (December 8) | Anouk | 3 | Jim van der Zee | "Stay with Me" | Vington | ✔ | ✔ | ✔ | —N/a |
| Episode 8 (December 8) | Waylon | 4 | Julia van Bergen | "One Last Time" / "Euphoria" | Maud Nieuwenhuis | —N/a | ✔ | — | — |
| Episode 8 (December 8) | Sanne Hans | 5 | Richelle van Ling | "Ik Was Toch Je Meisje" | Deborah de Groot | — | —N/a | — | — |
| Episode 8 (December 8) | Anouk | 6 | Heavenly | "Want to Want Me" / "I Wanna Dance With Somebody (Who Loves Me)" | Katharina Wildenbeest | ✔ | — | ✔ | —N/a |
| Episode 8 (December 8) | Waylon | 7 | Marchiano | "Ain't Got No, I Got Life" | Berenice van Leer | —N/a | — | — | — |
| Episode 9 (December 15) | Anouk | 1 | Renée de Gruijl | "Take Me to Church" | Joy van Keep | — | ✔ | — | —N/a |
| Episode 9 (December 15) | Sanne Hans | 2 | Kira Dekker | "Rockabye" / "Chained to the Rhythm" | Jaclyn Bradley Palmer | — | —N/a | — | — |
| Episode 9 (December 15) | Waylon | 3 | Silayio | "Scared to Be Lonely" | Lara Mallo | —N/a | — | ✔ | ✔ |
| Episode 9 (December 15) | Ali B | 4 | Gin Dutch | "Lady Marmalade" | Valerie Timmermans | ✔ | ✔ | —N/a | ✔ |
| Episode 9 (December 15) | Sanne Hans | 5 | Aïrto | "7 Years" | Jeroen Robben | — | —N/a | — | — |
| Episode 9 (December 15) | Anouk | 6 | N/A | "Symphony" | Nikita Pellencau | ✔ | — | — | —N/a |
| Episode 9 (December 15) | Anouk | 6 | N/A | "Symphony" | Nina ten Kate | — | — | — | —N/a |
| Episode 9 (December 15) | Ali B | 7 | Pieter van der Zweep | "Wereld Zonder Jou" | Iris de Schepper | — | — | —N/a | — |
| Episode 9 (December 15) | Ali B | 7 | Pieter van der Zweep | "Wereld Zonder Jou" | Mark Pathuis | — | — | —N/a | — |
| Episode 10 (December 22) | Ali B | 1 | Demi van Wijngaarden | "All I Ask" | Lilly-Jane Young | — | — | —N/a | ✔ |
| Episode 10 (December 22) | Sanne Hans | 2 | Sebastiën van Dorp | "Pride (In the Name of Love)" | Robin Smit | — | —N/a | — | — |
| Episode 10 (December 22) | Sanne Hans | 2 | Sebastiën van Dorp | "Pride (In the Name of Love)" | Florens Eykemans | — | —N/a | — | — |
| Episode 10 (December 22) | Anouk | 3 | Gideon Luciana | "Thinking Out Loud" | Cindy Bell | — | — | — | —N/a |
| Episode 10 (December 22) | Waylon | 4 | Tessa Looijen | "Shake It Off" | Milou Hesselink | —N/a | — | — | — |
| Episode 10 (December 22) | Sanne Hans | 5 | Bram Houg | "Wings" | Silke van de Klundert | ✔ | —N/a | — | — |
| Episode 10 (December 22) | Ali B | 6 | Ronald Klungel | "As Long As You Love Me" / "There's Nothing Holdin' Me Back" | Toon Mentink | — | — | —N/a | — |
| Episode 10 (December 22) | Waylon | 7 | Kimberly Maasdamme | "I'm Every Woman" | Soraya | —N/a | — | ✔ | — |
| Episode 11 (January 5) | Ali B | 1 | Aïcha Gill | "Ain't No Mountain High Enough" | Bryan Muntslag | — | — | —N/a | — |
| Episode 11 (January 5) | Waylon | 2 | Kelly Kockelkoren | "Just Like a Pill" | Jennifer Terwel | —N/a | — | — | — |
| Episode 11 (January 5) | Waylon | 2 | Kelly Kockelkoren | "Just Like a Pill" | Zoë Smit | —N/a | — | — | — |
| Episode 11 (January 5) | Sanne Hans | 3 | David van Rooij | "Sign of the Times" | Milan Velberg | — | —N/a | — | — |
| Episode 11 (January 5) | Anouk | 4 | Kevin Fullinck | "All About That Bass" | Noor Akarriou | — | — | — | —N/a |
| Episode 11 (January 5) | Ali B | 5 | Karlyn | "Hurt" | Imara Thomas | — | — | —N/a | — |
| Episode 11 (January 5) | Waylon | 6 | Simon van Rooij | "Let Me Love You" / "Let Me Love You" | Rowan du Chatenier | —N/a | — | — | — |
| Episode 11 (January 5) | Anouk | 7 | Nienke Wijnhoven | "You Don't Own Me" / "Zeg Maar Niets Meer" | Samantha Steenwijk | ✔ | ✔ | ✔ | —N/a |

== The Knockouts ==
Color key
– Contestant was eliminated, either immediately (indicated by a "—" in the "Switched with" column) or switched with another contestant
– Contestant was not switched out and advanced to the Live Shows

Artists' performances
| Episode | Coach | Order | Artist | Song | Result | Switched with |
|---|---|---|---|---|---|---|
| Episode 12 (January 12) | Waylon | 1 | Kimberly Maasdamme | "Who You Are" | Advanced | —N/a |
| Episode 12 (January 12) | Waylon | 2 | Silayio | "Runnin' (Lose It All)" | Advanced | —N/a |
| Episode 12 (January 12) | Waylon | 3 | Julia van Bergen | "Be the One" | Eliminated | —N/a |
| Episode 12 (January 12) | Waylon | 4 | Tessa Looijen | "Because of You" | Eliminated | Julia van Bergen |
| Episode 12 (January 12) | Waylon | 5 | Simon van Rooij | "Message in a Bottle" | Eliminated | — |
| Episode 12 (January 12) | Waylon | 6 | Silke van de Klundert | "Scars to Your Beautiful" | Eliminated | — |
| Episode 12 (January 12) | Waylon | 7 | Kelly Kockelkoren | "Shape of You" | Eliminated | — |
| Episode 12 (January 12) | Waylon | 8 | Marchiano | "How Am I Supposed to Live Without You" | Advanced | Tessa Looijen |
| Episode 12 (January 12) | Anouk | 1 | Gideon Luciana | "Sexy Als Ik Dans" | Advanced | —N/a |
| Episode 12 (January 12) | Anouk | 2 | Lilly-Jane Young | "Break Free" | Eliminated | —N/a |
| Episode 12 (January 12) | Anouk | 3 | Kevin Fullinck | "Love Never Felt So Good" | Eliminated | —N/a |
| Episode 12 (January 12) | Anouk | 4 | Jim van der Zee | "Without You" | Advanced | — |
| Episode 12 (January 12) | Anouk | 5 | Renée de Gruijl | "Something's Got a Hold on Me" | Eliminated | Lilly-Jane Young |
| Episode 12 (January 12) | Anouk | 6 | Nienke Wijnhoven | "Turning Tables" | Advanced | Renée de Gruijl |
| Episode 12 (January 12) | Anouk | 7 | Heavenly | "Pillowtalk" | Eliminated | — |
| Episode 13 (January 19) | Sanne Hans | 1 | Chris Alain | "Mirrors" | Eliminated | —N/a |
| Episode 13 (January 19) | Sanne Hans | 2 | Bram Houg | "Castle on the Hill" | Eliminated | —N/a |
| Episode 13 (January 19) | Sanne Hans | 3 | Richelle van Ling | "Dominique" | Eliminated | —N/a |
| Episode 13 (January 19) | Sanne Hans | 4 | Aïrto | "Rain" | Advanced | Bram Houg |
| Episode 13 (January 19) | Sanne Hans | 5 | Kira Dekker | "All My Life" | Eliminated | — |
| Episode 13 (January 19) | Sanne Hans | 6 | Sebastiën van Dorp | "Mind Made Up" | Eliminated | — |
| Episode 13 (January 19) | Sanne Hans | 7 | Samantha Steenwijk | "Liefde van Later" | Advanced | Richelle van Ling |
| Episode 13 (January 19) | Sanne Hans | 8 | David van Rooij | "Best Fake Smile" | Advanced | Chris Alain |
| Episode 13 (January 19) | Ali B | 1 | Pieter van der Zweep | "Onderweg" | Eliminated | —N/a |
| Episode 13 (January 19) | Ali B | 2 | Karlyn | "Back to You" | Eliminated | —N/a |
| Episode 13 (January 19) | Ali B | 3 | Tjindjara Metschendorp | "Dusk Till Dawn" | Advanced | —N/a |
| Episode 13 (January 19) | Ali B | 4 | Ronald Klungel | "Nothing Ever Hurt Like You" | Advanced | Karlyn |
| Episode 13 (January 19) | Ali B | 5 | Gin Dutch | "Havana" | Eliminated | — |
| Episode 13 (January 19) | Ali B | 6 | Demi van Wijngaarden | "Make It Rain" | Advanced | Pieter van der Zweep |
| Episode 13 (January 19) | Ali B | 7 | Soraya | "Déjà Vu" | Eliminated | — |
| Episode 13 (January 19) | Ali B | 8 | Aïcha Gill | "See You Again" | Eliminated | — |

== The Live Shows ==
Color key
– Artist had one of the six lowest scores and was eliminated
– Artist's score was among the top six, advancing them to the next Live round
– Artist was voted through by the public vote after having one of the lowest scores

=== Week 1: Top 12 (January 26) ===
| Order | Coach | Artist | Song | Coaches' scores | | | | | Public vote score | Total score | Result |
| Order | Coach | Artist | Song | Waylon | Sanne Hans | Ali B | Anouk | Average score | Public vote score | Total score | Result |
|---|---|---|---|---|---|---|---|---|---|---|---|
| 1 | Waylon | Kimberly Maasdamme | "Came Here for Love" | 8.5 | 8.0 | 8.5 | 8.0 | 8.25 | 8.48 | 16.73 | Advanced |
| 2 | Anouk | Gideon Luciana | "Love Me Now" | 6.5 | 6.5 | 7.0 | 5.0 | 6.25 | 6.95 | 13.20 | Eliminated |
| 3 | Ali B | Ronald Klungel | "For the First Time" | 7.5 | 9.0 | 8.0 | 5.0 | 7.38 | 7.42 | 14.80 | Advanced |
| 4 | Sanne Hans | Samantha Steenwijk | "Always" (Dutch version) | 7.0 | 9.0 | 8.5 | 10.0 | 8.63 | 7.99 | 16.62 | Advanced |
| 5 | Anouk | Nienke Wijnhoven | "Paint It Black" | 6.5 | 8.0 | 9.0 | 10.0 | 8.38 | 8.25 | 16.63 | Advanced |
| 6 | Waylon | Marchiano | "Can't Stop the Feeling!" | 7.0 | 7.0 | 7.5 | 6.0 | 6.88 | 6.27 | 13.15 | Eliminated |
| 7 | Sanne Hans | Aïrto | "Dive In" (original song) | 9.0 | 8.0 | 8.0 | 7.0 | 8.0 | 6.86 | 14.86 | Advanced |
| 8 | Ali B | Demi van Wijngaarden | "Skin" | 10.0 | 8.5 | 9.5 | 9.0 | 9.25 | 8.63 | 17.88 | Advanced |
| 9 | Sanne Hans | David van Rooij | "Sorry" | 7.0 | 8.5 | 7.5 | 4.0 | 6.75 | 6.12 | 12.87 | Eliminated |
| 10 | Waylon | Silayio | "Wolves" | 9.0 | 7.0 | 7.5 | 8.0 | 7.88 | 7.31 | 15.19 | Advanced |
| 11 | Anouk | Jim van der Zee | "Vincent" | 10.0 | 10.0 | 10.0 | 10.0 | 10.0 | 8.52 | 18.52 | Advanced |
| 12 | Ali B | Tjindjara Metschendorp | "Thriller" | 6.5 | 8.0 | 10.0 | 8.0 | 8.13 | 8.09 | 16.22 | Advanced |

Non-competition performances
| Order | Performer | Song |
|---|---|---|
| 1 | Top 12 | "Perfect" |
| 2 | The Script, Aïrto and Ronald | "Rain" |
| 3 | The Script | "Arms Open" |

=== Week 2: Top 9 (February 2) ===
| Order | Coach | Artist | Song | Coaches' scores | | | | | Public vote score | Total score | Result |
| Order | Coach | Artist | Song | Waylon | Sanne Hans | Ali B | Anouk | Average score | Public vote score | Total score | Result |
|---|---|---|---|---|---|---|---|---|---|---|---|
| 1 | Sanne Hans | Aïrto | "Stargazing" | 7.5 | 8.0 | 7.0 | 7.0 | 7.38 | 6.76 | 14.14 | Eliminated |
| 2 | Anouk | Nienke Wijnhoven | "Angel" | 8.0 | 8.5 | 7.5 | 9.0 | 8.25 | 7.61 | 15.86 | Advanced |
| 3 | Ali B | Ronald Klungel | "Wonderful World" | 7.5 | 7.5 | 8.0 | 6.0 | 7.25 | 6.90 | 14.15 | Eliminated |
| 4 | Waylon | Silayio | "Freedom! '90" | 8.0 | 8.0 | 7.0 | 6.5 | 7.38 | 6.73 | 14.11 | Eliminated |
| 5 | Ali B | Demi van Wijngaarden | "Listen" | 8.5 | 9.0 | 10.0 | 9.0 | 9.13 | 8.74 | 17.87 | Advanced |
| 6 | Anouk | Jim van der Zee | "Human" | 9.0 | 8.5 | 9.5 | 10.0 | 9.25 | 8.99 | 18.24 | Advanced |
| 7 | Sanne Hans | Samantha Steenwijk | "Papa" | 8.5 | 10.0 | 9.0 | 8.0 | 8.88 | 8.57 | 17.45 | Advanced |
| 8 | Ali B | Tjindjara Metschendorp | "New Rules" | 7.5 | 6.0 | 9.0 | 6.5 | 7.25 | 6.44 | 13.69 | Advanced |
| 9 | Waylon | Kimberly Maasdamme | "Earth Song" | 10.0 | 10.0 | 10.0 | 10.0 | 10.0 | 8.77 | 18.77 | Advanced |

Non-competition performances
| Order | Performer | Song |
|---|---|---|
| 1 | Top 9 | "I Wish" |
| 2 | Maan, Kimberly and Tjindjara | "24K Magic" |
| 3 | Nothing But Thieves, Ronald and Silayio | "Sorry" |
| 4 | Ronnie Flex and Maan | ‘Blijf bij mij’ |

=== Week 3: Semi-Final - Top 6 (February 9) ===
Just like previous seasons, this week, after all six artists have performed their first songs, one was eliminated based on the ongoing public vote. A second artist was then eliminated after the top 5's second performances regardless of their teams, leaving four artists advanced to the finale. With the elimination of Kimberly, Waylon had no more act left on his team to compete. With Jim and Nienke still on the competition, Anouk is the first female coach to advance two of her artists into the final. Also, Samantha Steenwijk was the first stolen artist to have ever made it to the finals in the show's history.

| Order | Coach | Artist | 1st Song | Result | Order | 2nd Song | Result |
|---|---|---|---|---|---|---|---|
| 1 | Anouk | Jim van der Zee | "Feeling Good" | Public's Vote | 10 | "Wicked Game" | Public's Vote |
| 2 | Ali B | Demi van Wijngaarden | "Set Fire To The Rain" | Public's Vote | 11 | "Cry Me a River" | Public's Vote |
| 3 | Sanne Hans | Samantha Steenwijk | "Ik kan echt zonder jou" | Public's Vote | 7 | "Wat zou je doen" (with Sanne Hans) | Public's Vote |
| 4 | Waylon | Kimberly Maasdamme | "Sweet Dreams" | Eliminated | "Un-Break My Heart" (Already eliminated) | | |
| 5 | Ali B | Tjindjara Metschendorp | "Million Reasons" | Public's Vote | 9 | "All Falls Down" | Eliminated |
| 6 | Anouk | Nienke Wijnhoven | "One Last Time" | Public's Vote | 8 | "Let it Go" | Public's Vote |

Non-competition performances
| Order | Performer | Song |
|---|---|---|
| 1 | On Your Feet and Top 6 | Dr. Beat & Conga Mashup |
| 2 | Top 6 | “I Just Called To Say I Love You” |

=== Week 4: Final (February 16) ===
| Order | Coach | Artist | First song | Order | Second song | Order | Single | Result |
|---|---|---|---|---|---|---|---|---|
| 1 | Ali B | Demi van Wijngaarden | "Still Got the Blues (For You)" | 6 | "Finesse" (with Ali B & Vinchenzo Tahapary) | N/A | N/A (Already eliminated) | Fourth place |
| 2 | Anouk | Nienke Wijnhoven | "Somebody That I Used To Know" (with Waylon) | 5 | "The Power of Love" | 9 | "Ex's & Oh's" | Third place |
| 3 | Anouk | Jim van der Zee | "Vincent" | 8 | "Bridge Over Troubled Water" (with Jennie Lena) | 11 | "I'm on Fire" | Winner |
| 4 | Sanne Hans | Samantha Steenwijk | "Ik ben zo eenzaam zonder jou" (with Gerard Joling) | 7 | "Ik Leef Mijn Eigen Leven" | 10 | "Let Me Try Again" | Runner-up |

Non-competition performances
| Order | Performer | Song |
|---|---|---|
| 1 | Anne-Marie | "Ciao Adios" |
| 2 | Kimberly Maasdamme and Ladies of Soul | "River Deep – Mountain High" |
| 3 | Lil Kleine | "Loterij" |

Notes

1. Backstage performance

== Elimination Chart ==
=== Overall ===
Color key
Artist's info

- Artist from Team Waylon
- Artist from Team Sanne
- Artist from Team Ali B
- Artist from Team Anouk

Result details

- Winner
- Runner-up
- Third place
- Fourth place
- Artist had the highest combined score of the week
- Artist was either saved by the public vote or by the total score
- Artist was eliminated

Live show results per week
| Artist | Week 1 | Week 2 | Week 3 | | Finals |
| Artist | Week 1 | Week 2 | Round 1 | Round 2 | Finals |
|---|---|---|---|---|---|
| Jim van der Zee | Safe | Safe | Safe | Safe | Winner |
| Samantha Steenwijk | Safe | Safe | Safe | Safe | Runner-up |
| Nienke Wijnhoven | Safe | Safe | Safe | Safe | 3rd place |
| Demi van Wijngaarden | Safe | Safe | Safe | Safe | 4th place |
| Tjindjara Metschendorp | Safe | Safe | Safe | Eliminated | |
| Kimberly Maasdamme | Safe | Safe | Eliminated | | |
| Aïrto Edmundo | Safe | Eliminated | | | |
| Ronald Klungel | Safe | Eliminated | | | |
| Silayio | Safe | Eliminated | | | |
| David van Rooij | Eliminated | | | | |
| Gideon Luciana | Eliminated | | | | |
| Marchiano Markus | Eliminated | | | | |

=== Team ===
Color key
Artist's info

- Artist from Team Waylon
- Artist from Team Sanne
- Artist from Team Ali B
- Artist from Team Anouk

Result details

- Winner
- Runner-up
- Third place
- Fourth place
- Artist had the highest combined score of the week
- Artist was eliminated

Live show results per week
| Artist | Week 1 | Week 2 | Week 3 | | Finals |
| Artist | Week 1 | Week 2 | Round 1 | Round 2 | Finals |
|---|---|---|---|---|---|
| Kimberly Maasdamme | Advanced | Advanced | Eliminated | | |
| Silayio | Advanced | Eliminated | | | |
| Marchiano Markus | Eliminated | | | | |
| Samantha Steenwijk | Advanced | Advanced | Advanced | Advanced | Runner-up |
| Aïrto Edmundo | Advanced | Eliminated | | | |
| David van Rooij | Eliminated | | | | |
| Demi van Wijngaarden | Advanced | Advanced | Advanced | Advanced | 4th place |
| Tjindjara Metschendorp | Advanced | Advanced | Advanced | Eliminated | |
| Ronald Klungel | Advanced | Eliminated | | | |
| Jim van der Zee | Advanced | Advanced | Advanced | Advanced | Winner |
| Nienke Wijnhoven | Advanced | Advanced | Advanced | Advanced | 3rd place |
| Gideon Luciana | Eliminated | | | | |

== Artists' appearances in other media ==
- Nikita Pellencau turned three chairs in season 6, opting to be part of Sanne Hans' team. She won her battle against fellow Team Sanne member Chris Link, but was eliminated in the Knockouts.
- Aïcha Gill participated with the girlband Sway X Factor 2011
- Aïrto participated with the Best Singer Songwriter 2015.
- Lara Mallo also participated with season 2 and sat in Team Angela. She was in the battle against Rodney Elzer and then lost against him
- Gin Dutch participated X Factor 2013
- Katharina Wildenbeest participated Holland's Got Talent 2017.
- Samantha Steenwijk participated with Bloed, zweet en tranen 2013.
- Kira Dekker participated with the Best Singer Songwriter 2014.
- Julia van Bergen came 8th in the Junior Eurovision Song Contest 2014 representing the Netherlands..
- Gideon Luciana first auditioned in season 6, but did not turn any chairs.
- Demi van Wijngaarden participated in the third season of the Netherlands version of The Voice Kids as part of Team Marco Borsato and made it to the finals, eventually losing to fellow Team Borsato member Ayoub Maach.
- Silke van de Klundert participated in the fourth season of The Voice Kids as a member of Team Borsato, but did not make it past the Battles.
- Simon van Rooij participated in the fourth season of The Voice Kids as a member of Team Borsato, but did not make it past the Battles.
- Tjindjara participated in the annual preselection for the Junior Eurovision Song Contest, Junior Songfestival, in 2005. She made it to the finale, but lost to Tess Gaerthé, Tjindjara participated in X Factor in 2013. .
- Jennifer Terwel competed on the second season of the Dutch version of the reality singing competition X Factor in 2009, making it to the finals and placing 11th.
- Jaclyn Bradley Palmer was a regular cast member on Vh1's Breaking Bonaduce and was also featured on MTV's Date my Mom and HGTV's House Hunters International.
- Roemillo Baumgard, with his family, is a part of the series "A House full of Baumgard."
- Karlyn (Karlijn Verhagen) participated in X Factor in 2013.
- Milan Velberg appeared on Holland's Got Talent and The Next Boy / Girl Band.
- Toon Mentink participated in The Next Girl / Boyband where is group: "boyband 4U" won the competition.

== Ratings ==
| Episode | Airdate | Total | Total with late watching |
|---|---|---|---|
| The Blind Auditions 1 | October 20, 2017 | 2.059.000 | 2.211.000 |
| The Blind Auditions 2 | October 27, 2017 | 2.211.000 | 2.375.000 |
| The Blind Auditions 3 | November 3, 2017 | 2.331.000 | 2.573.000 |
| The Blind Auditions 4 | November 10, 2017 | 2.291.000 | 2.519.000 |
| The Blind Auditions 5 | November 17, 2017 | 2.352.000 | 2.568.000 |
| The Blind Auditions 6 | November 24, 2017 | 2.310.000 | 2.503.000 |
| The Blind Auditions 7 | December 1, 2017 | 2.049.000 | 2.301.000 |
| The Battles 1 | December 8, 2017 | 2.167.000 | 2.377.000 |
| The Battles 2 | December 15, 2017 | 2.190.000 | 2.376.000 |
| The Battles 3 | December 22, 2017 | 2.081.000 | 2.263.000 |
| The Battles 4 | January 5, 2018 | 2.109.000 | 2.261.000 |
| The Knockouts 1 | January 12, 2018 | 2.132.000 | 2.282.000 |
| The Knockouts 2 | January 19, 2018 | 2.134.000 | 2.298.000 |
| The Live Show 1 | January 26, 2018 | 2.023.000 | 2.241.000 |
| The Live Show 2 | February 2, 2018 | 1.915.000 | 2.085.000 |
| The Live Show 3 | February 9, 2018 | 2.194.000 | 2.307.000 |
| The Finals | February 16, 2018 | 2.368.000 | 2.492.000 |
