= Ablitt =

Ablitt is a surname that derives from the word 'abet'.

Notable people with this name include:

- Tim Ablitt, leader of the English Defence League
- Taylor Ablitt, founder of Diply
- Ablitt Cup, named after Bernard Ablitt
- Nathan Ablitt, in Mildenhall Fen Tigers
- Steven Ablitt in 2001 IAAF World Cross Country Championships – Junior men's race
