= Jim van der Zee =

Dutch singer

- Born: 17 January 1995 (age 31); Driebergen, Netherlands
- Genres: Pop, Soul
- Occupation: Singer
- Instrument: Vocals
- Years active: 2018–present
- Label: 8ball Music

Jim van der Zee (born 17 January 1995) is a Dutch singer who won the 8th season of the Voice of Holland.

== Life and career ==
Van der Zee was born on 17 January 1995, in Driebergen, in the province of Utrecht.

== Discography ==
=== Singles ===
- "I'm on Fire"

Awards and achievements
Preceded by Pleun Bierbooms	Winner of The Voice of Holland; Season eight (2017–2018)	Succeeded by Dennis Van Aarssen
