= Sanne Hans =

Dutch singer

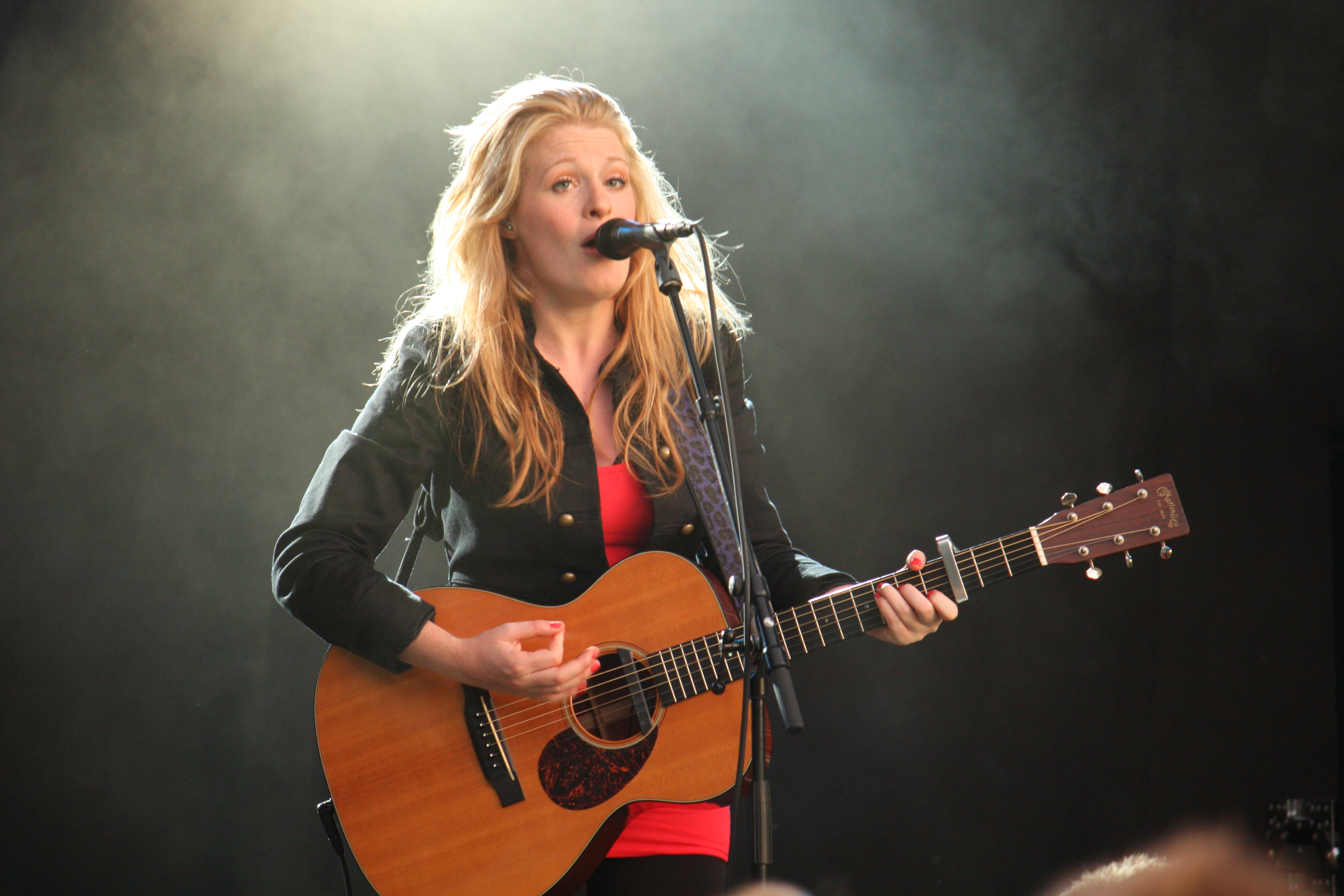

Background information
- Born: Roos-Anne (Sanne) Hans; 22 September 1984 (age 41); Hardenberg, Netherlands
- Genres: Pop
- Occupations: Singer, songwriter
- Instruments: Vocals, guitar
- Years active: 2005–present
- Label: 8 Ball Music

Ysis
- Origin: Netherlands
- Genres: Pop
- Years active: 2005-2008
- Members: Sanne Hans; Inge van Calkar; Ilse Gerritsen

Miss Montreal
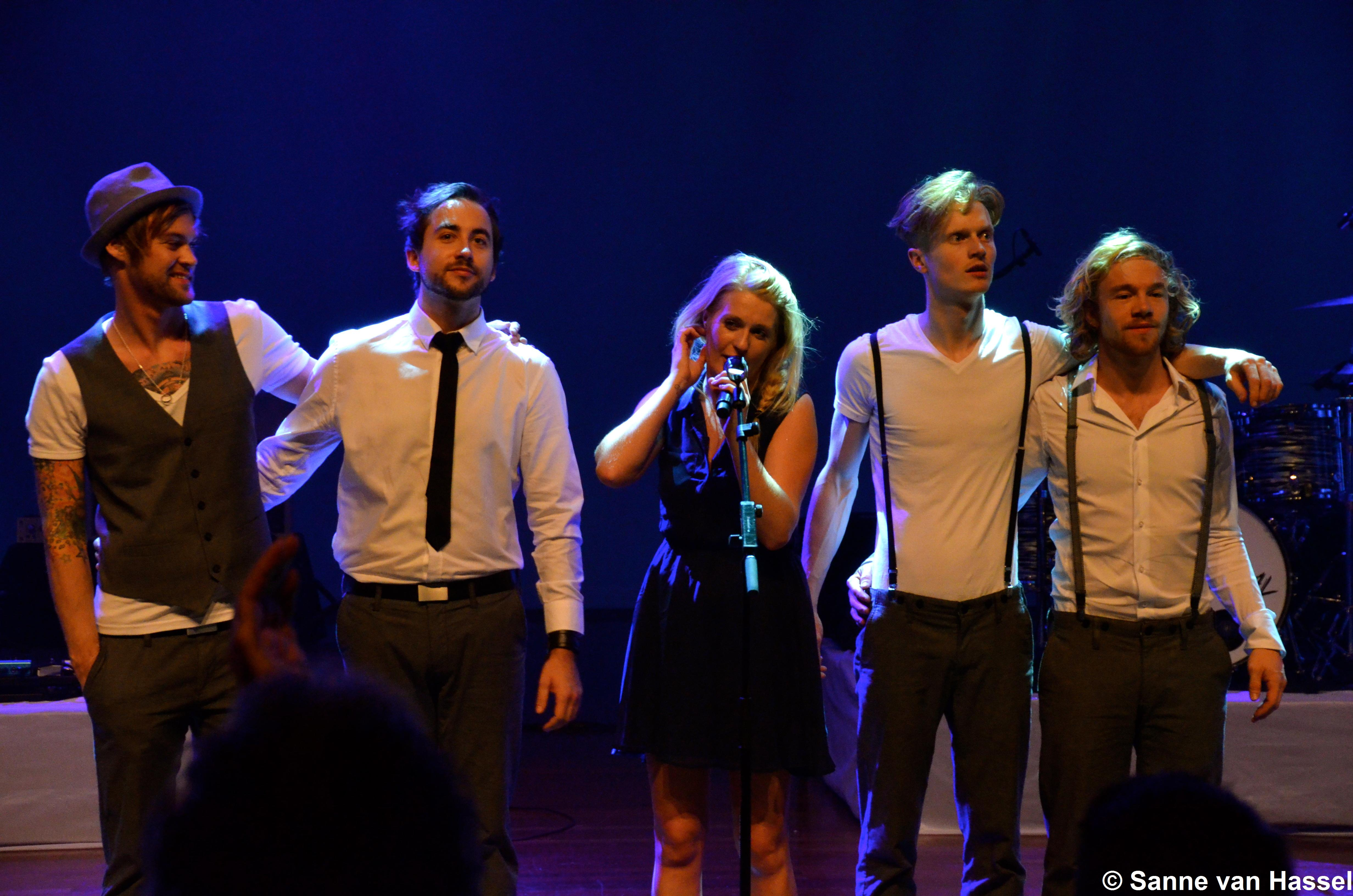
- Sanne and her band 'Miss Montreal' during "S-SS-SSS-Sanne" tour

Background information
- Origin: Netherlands
- Genres: Pop, Rock
- Years active: 2008-present
- Label: 8 Ball Music
- Members: Sanne Hans; Kobus Groen; Michi Schwiemann; Thijs Rensink; Peter Hendriks
- Website: www.missmontreal.nl

Roos-Anne (Sanne) Hans (born 22 September 1984 in Dedemsvaart), is a Dutch singer-songwriter and guitar player. She was part of Ysis until 2008 and later formed the band Miss Montreal.

== Ysis ==
Sanne Hans first was part of the formation Ysis made up of her on vocals and guitar, Inge van Calkar also on guitar and vocals and Ilse Gerritsen on the cello. They all stutter, with no impact on their singing.

== Miss Montreal ==
October 2008 she started as the lead singer of a new band Miss Montreal, together with Kobus Groen (bass, backing vocals), Michi Schwiemann (guitar), Thijs Rensink (drums) and Peter Hendriks (keyboards). Their first single was "Just a Flirt" followed by a debut album the self-titled Miss Montreal in May 2009 releasing "This is my life" as a second single. She appeared in a number of festivals including in Lowlands, Parkpop, Beatstad and Zwarte Cross and opened for Coldplay at the Goffertpark in front of 70,000 spectators. She sang "Won't You Let Me Have My Way with You" featuring Bertolf Lentink in a joint EP released in 2009 by the two artists.

The second Miss Montreal album So... Anything Else came in July 2010 with a grand tour of 20 Dutch cities to promote the album. The tour continued until April 2011. Her third album I Am a Hunter was released on 13 April 2012, engaging on another long tour called "S-SS-SSS-Sanne" stretching until March 2013.

== Solo career ==
In addition to her work in Ysis and Miss Montreal, she has also pursued a solo career. After Ysis disbanded in 2008, she did advertising features and appeared on various radio and television shows. She also sang "Dansen aan zee" with Dutch band BLØF and "I Am Sorry" with Dutch band Only Seven Left.

She became famous by singing the intro to the children TV program Huisje, Boompje, Beestje in 2009. and in 2012, she appeared as a member of the jury of the television series De beste singer-songwriter van Nederland, and she was a coach on the sixth, seventh and eighth seasons of The Voice of Holland. It was announced on 24 June 2019 by the broadcaster's Facebook, that Sanne would be replacing Ilse Delange as coach in the ninth season of The Voice Kids.

== Discography: Sanne Hans ==
=== Singles ===
Year	NLD Single Top 100	Peak positions	Album
Year	NLD Single Top 100	Dutch Album Top 100	Album
2015	"Neem me mee" (with Marco Borsato)	56	

== Discography: Miss Montreal ==
=== Albums ===
Year	Album	Peak positions
Year	Album	Dutch Album Top 100
2009	Miss Montreal	15
2010	So... Anything Else?	10
2012	I Am Hunter	5
2014	Irrational	3
2016	Don't Wake Me Up	2

Demo albums

Year	Album	Peak positions
Year	Album	Dutch Album Top 100
2012	The Home Recordings	81

Compilation albums

Year	Album	Peak positions
Year	Album	Dutch Album Top 100
2015	The Singles Collection	2

EPs

- 2009: Miss Montreal / Bertolf (joint EP) [8ball Music]

=== Singles ===
Year	Single	Peak positions			Album
Year	Single	NED Dutch Top 40	NED Dutch Single Top 100	BEL (Fl)	Album
2008	"Just a Flirt"	11	4	—	Miss Montreal
2009	"This Is My Life"	Tip6	19	—	Miss Montreal
2009	"Seven Friends"	Tip3	31	—	Miss Montreal
2009	"Addicted to Crying"	—	19	—	Miss Montreal
2009	"Being Alone at Christmas"	5	7	—	So... Anything Else?
2010	"Swing the Night Away"	34	23	—	So... Anything Else?
2010	"Say What You See"	Tip13	—	—	So... Anything Else?
2011	"Wish I Could"	35	31	—	I Am Hunter
2011	"I know I Will Be Fine"	—	41	—	I Am Hunter
2012	"I Am Hunter"	28	20	—	I Am Hunter
2012	"Wonderful Days"	15	4	—	Non-album release
2012	"Better When It Hurts"	Tip8	—	—	I Am Hunter
2012	"Giving Up on You"	Tip12	—	—	I Am Hunter
2013	"Hoe" (with Nielson)	4	5	3* (Ultratip)	
2013	"Heavy Heart"	Tip5	69	—	
2013	"Say Heaven Say Hell"	35	27	—	
2015	"Love You Now"	23	82	—	
2015	"Ik zoek alleen mezelf" (with Paskal Jakobsen)	—	56	49* (Ultratip)	
2017	"A Million Ways"	26	—	—	
2019	"Scared of Love" (with Wulf)	31	—	—	
2019	"Een stap terug"	36	—	—	
2020	"Hier"	37	—	—	
2021	"Alles"	33	64	—	
2025	"Please Just Come Home" (with Douwe Bob)	—	87	—	

Tip means the release did not chart on the Dutch Top 40, but appeared on the Tipparade for "bubbling under" hits
*Did not appear in the official Belgian Ultratop 50 charts, but rather in the bubbling under Ultratip charts.

=== Other charting songs ===
Year	Single	Peak positions			Album
Year	Single	NED Dutch Top 40	NED Dutch Single Top 100	BEL (Fl)	Album
2020	"Door de wind"	3	6	36	From; Beste Zangers 2020
2020	"Laat me" (with Stef Bos)	—	36	—	From; Beste Zangers 2020
2020	"Have You Ever Seen the Rain" (with Milow)	—	66	—	From; Beste Zangers 2020
