= The Voice of Holland season 6 =

The Voice of Holland
- Season 6
- Hosted by: Martijn Krabbé; Wendy van Dijk; Jamai Loman (red room)
- Coaches: Marco Borsato; Anouk; Ali B Sanne Hans
- Winner: Maan de Steenwinkel
- Winning coach: Marco Borsato
- Runner-up: Dave Vermeulen

Release
- Original network: RTL 4
- Original release: 25 September 2015 – 29 January 2016

Season chronology
- ← Previous; Season 5 Next → Season 7

The sixth season of the Dutch reality singing competition The Voice of Holland premiered on 25 September 2015 on RTL 4. Martijn Krabbé, Wendy van Dijk, and Jamai Loman all returned, as did Marco Borsato and Ali B as coaches. However, the sixth season saw Trijntje Oosterhuis and Ilse DeLange replaced by Dutch singer-songwriters Anouk and Sanne Hans from the band Miss Montreal. This is the last season that Marco Borsato appeared as a coach on the show, as he announced on 13 November 2015 that he will not be returning for the next season. In his place, singer Waylon will serve as coach for Season 7. The season was won by Maan de Steenwinkel of Team Borsato, and this is Borsato's fourth time as winning coach.

One of the important premises of the show is the quality of the singing talent. Four coaches, themselves popular performing artists, train the talents in their group and occasionally perform with them. Talents are selected in blind auditions, where the coaches cannot see, but only hear the auditioner.

Naomi Sharon Webster later went on to sign to rapper Drake's record label OVO Sound.

== Coaches ==
Marco Borsato and Ali B have returned for season 6, while Anouk Teeuwe and Sanne Hans replace former judges Ilse DeLange and Trijntje Oosterhuis.

== Teams ==
Color key

– Winner
– Runner-up
– Third place
– Fourth place

– Eliminated in the Live Shows
– Eliminated in the Knockout Rounds
– Artist was stolen by another coach (Name is strikethroughed)
– Eliminated in the Battle Rounds

Coaches	Top 40 artists				
Anouk	Jennie Lena	Neda Boin	Brandon Delagraentiss	Sanne Mallant	Dali Philippo
Anouk	~~Leonie Bos~~	Tevin Raynor	Naomi Sharon Webster	Job Lentferink	
Ali B	Brace	Ivar Vermeulen	Gaia Aikman	Natacha Carvalho	Melissa Meewisse
Ali B	Maylissa Row	Racheal Botha	Danjil Tuhumena	Eva van der Donk	Jefferson
Ali B	Fabiënne Mucuk	Dion Cuiper	Jasmine Karimova		
Sanne Hans	Dave Vermeulen	Ivan Peroti	Daniël Kist	Nikita Pellencau	Elise de Koning
Sanne Hans	Christie Middel	Jasper van Aarst	Arthur ter Voert	Chris Link	Fabiënne Lantinga
Sanne Hans	Agnes Diawara				
Marco Borsato	Maan de Steenwinkel	Melissa Janssen	Jared Grant	Kelvin Muïs	Tibisay Mercera
Marco Borsato	Leonie Bos	~~Sanne Mallant~~	~~Natacha Carvalho~~	~~Daniël Kist~~	Babette van Vugt
Marco Borsato	Tommie Christiaan				
Stolen contestants are italicized.

== Blind auditions ==
Color key

✔	Coach hit his/her "I WANT YOU" button
	Artist defaulted to this coach's team	Artist elected to join this coach's team
	Artist eliminated with no coach pressing his or her "I WANT YOU" button

=== Episode 1 (September 25) ===
Order	Artist	Age	Song	Coach's and contestant's choices			
Order	Artist	Age	Song	Anouk	Ali B	Sanne	Marco
1	Dave Vermeulen	22	"Call Me the Breeze"	—	✔	✔	✔
2	Gaia Aikman	23	"I'm Your Baby Tonight"	—	✔	✔	—
3	Maan de Steenwinkel	18	"The Power of Love"	✔	✔	✔	✔
4	Christie Middel	21	"Think Twice"	✔	✔	✔	✔
5	Thijs Pot	17	"Can't Hold Us" / "Things We Lost in the Fire"	—	—	—	—
6	Leonie Bos	27	"Somebody to Love"	✔	✔	—	—
7	Racheal Botha	27	"My Love is Your Love" / "No Woman, No Cry"	✔	✔	—	—
8	Jasper van Aarst	21	"The Book of Love"	—	—	✔	—
9	Jolentha Zaat	25	"Hold My Hand"	—	—	—	—
10	Mylène de la Haye	56	"Nothing Ever Hurt Like You"	—	—	—	—
11	Jennie Lena	37	"Who's Lovin' You"	✔	✔	✔	✔

=== Episode 2 (October 2) ===
Order	Artist	Age	Song	Coach's and contestant's choices			
Order	Artist	Age	Song	Anouk	Ali B	Sanne	Marco
1	Melissa Janssen	18	"The House of the Rising Sun"	—	✔	✔	✔
2	Fiona Sarah Vredenduin	21	"Highway to Hell"	—	—	—	—
3	Brandon Delagraentiss	38	"Uptown Funk"	✔	✔	✔	✔
4	Daniël Kist	22	"Thinking Out Loud"	—	✔	✔	✔
5	Jasmine Karimova	17	"Habits (Stay High)"	—	✔	—	—
6	Job Lentferink	20	"You Make It Real"	✔	—	—	—
7	Nikita Pellencau	16	"Love Me Like You Do"	✔	✔	✔	—
8	Brigit Schouten	26	"I Knew You Were Trouble"	—	—	—	—
9	Ivar Vermeulen	40	"Wonderwall"	—	✔	—	✔
10	Melynda Milman	38	"I Still Cry"	—	—	—	—
11	Brace	28	"Flink Zijn"	✔	✔	✔	✔

=== Episode 3 (October 9) ===
Order	Artist	Age	Song	Coach's and contestant's choices			
Order	Artist	Age	Song	Anouk	Ali B	Sanne	Marco
1	Jared Grant	24	"Lately"	—	✔	—	✔
2	Naomi Sharon Webster	20	"A Natural Woman"	✔	✔	—	—
3	Aukje en Tyrone		"No Air"	—	—	—	—
4	Tommie Christiaan	29	"It Will Rain"	—	✔	✔	✔
5	Maylissa Row	18	"Bang Bang"	—	✔	—	—
6	Gideon Luciana	18	"Hero"	—	—	—	—
7	Dion Cuiper	21	"Feeling Good"	—	✔	—	✔
8	Jefferson	27	"The Monster" / "Lose Yourself"	—	✔	—	—
9	Tibisay Mercera	25	"Give In to Me"	—	—	—	✔
10	Noëlle Visser	20	"Just Like a Pill"	—	—	—	—
11	Elise de Koning	21	"Hero"	✔	✔	✔	✔

=== Episode 4 (October 16) ===
Order	Artist	Age	Song	Coach's and contestant's choices			
Order	Artist	Age	Song	Anouk	Ali B	Sanne	Marco
1	Agnes Diawara	17	"J'me Tire"	—	—	✔	—
2	Vincent de Lusenet	34	"Chandelier"	—	—	—	—
3	Melissa Meewisse	17	"Thinking of You"	—	✔	—	—
4	Natacha Carvalho	19	"The Girl You Lost to Cocaine"	✔	✔	✔	✔
5	Chris Link	34	"Samen Zijn" / "Amy"	—	—	✔	✔
6	Alisha Ramcharan	19	"Burn"	—	—	—	—
7	Arthur ter Voert	36	"Sex on Fire"	—	✔	✔	—
8	Eva van der Donk	19	"The Edge of Glory"	—	✔	—	—
9	Omar Andrew	24	"How Come, How Long"	—	—	—	—
10	Dali Philippo	16	"De Zee"	✔	✔	✔	—
11	Neda Boin	25	"Yesterday"	✔	✔	✔	✔

=== Episode 5 (October 23) ===
Order	Artist	Age	Song	Coach's and contestant's choices			
Order	Artist	Age	Song	Anouk	Ali B	Sanne	Marco
1	Sanne Mallant	30	"Who Wants to Live Forever"	—	✔	—	✔
2	Barry James Thomas	52	"A Change Is Gonna Come"	—	—	—	—
3	Fabiënne Lantinga	27	"Purple Rain"	—	—	✔	—
4	Babette van Vugt	21	"Mamma Knows Best"	—	✔	✔	✔
5	Tevin Raynor	21	"Take Me to Church"	✔	✔	—	—
6	Danjil Tuhumena	41	"Valerie"	—	✔	—	✔
7	Constantijn Schaap	23	"Not Over You"	—	—	—	—
8	Kelvin Muïs	25	"Wake Me Up"	—	—	—	✔
9	Fabiënne Mucuk	19	"The Book of Love"^{1}	✔	✔	—	—
10	Ivan Peroti	38	"Let's Stay Together"	✔	✔	✔	✔

Notes

1. After singing her blind audition song, contestant Fabiënne Mucuk was requested, by coach Ali B, to sing a second song. She sang "I'm Gonna Find Another You" by John Mayer.

== The Battle Rounds ==
The battle rounds determine which candidates from each team advance to the Knockout Rounds. Two contestants from within a team sing in a vocal battle against each other, and ultimately, in this season's case, 4 artists from Team Anouk, 6 artists from Team Ali B, and 5 artists from Teams Sanne and Borsato will advance. Continuing from season 4, each coach is allowed to steal one contestant from another coach's team. Continuing from Season 5, the studio audience can vote on contestants (through their own mobile phones). They can vote for that contestant (red vs. blue), thus helping influence the coach's decision on who moves on.

Color key:

Artist won the Battle and advanced to the Knockout Rounds
Artist lost the Battle but was stolen by another coach and advanced to the Knockout Rounds
Artist lost the Battle and was eliminated

Episode	Coach	Order	Winner	Song	Loser	'Steal' result			
Episode	Coach	Order	Winner	Song	Loser	Anouk	Ali B	Sanne	Marco
Episode 6 (October 30)	Marco Borsato	1	Kelvin Muïs	"Fire"	Daniël Kist	—	—	✔	—N/a
Episode 6 (October 30)	Ali B	2	Melissa Meewisse	"Hold My Hand"	Jasmine Karimova	—	—N/a	—N/a	—
Episode 6 (October 30)	Sanne Hans	3	Ivan Peroti	"Hold Back the River"	Agnes Diawara	—	—	—N/a	—
Episode 6 (October 30)	Marco Borsato	4	Melissa Janssen	"Love Runs Out"	Natacha Carvalho	—	✔	—N/a	—N/a
Episode 6 (October 30)	Ali B	5	Brace	"Never Nooit Meer"	Dion Cuiper	—	—N/a	—N/a	—
Episode 6 (October 30)	Anouk	6	Jennie Lena	"Roar"	Leonie Bos	—N/a	—N/a	—N/a	✔
Episode 7 (November 6)	Sanne Hans	1	Elise de Koning	"Titanium"	Fabiënne Lantinga	—	—N/a	—N/a	—N/a
Episode 7 (November 6)	Anouk	2	Dali Philippo	"Counting Stars"	Job Lentferink	—N/a	—N/a	—N/a	—N/a
Episode 7 (November 6)	Ali B	3	Racheal Botha	"Ain't Nobody"	Fabiënne Mucuk	—	—N/a	—N/a	—N/a
Episode 7 (November 6)	Marco Borsato	4	Maan de Steenwinkel	"The Voice Within"	Sanne Mallant	✔	—N/a	—N/a	—N/a
Episode 7 (November 6)	Sanne Hans	5	Nikita Pellencau	"Love Me Again"	Chris Link	—N/a	—N/a	—N/a	—N/a
Episode 7 (November 6)	Ali B	6	Gaia Aikman	"See You Again"	Jefferson	—N/a	—N/a	—N/a	—N/a
Episode 7 (November 6)	Marco Borsato	7	Jared Grant	"Treasure"	Tommie Christiaan	—N/a	—N/a	—N/a	—N/a
Episode 8 (November 13)	Sanne Hans	1	Dave Vermeulen	"Run to You"	Arthur ter Voert	—N/a	—N/a	—N/a	—N/a
Episode 8 (November 13)	Ali B	2	Maylissa Row	"Dangerous"	Eva van der Donk	—N/a	—N/a	—N/a	—N/a
Episode 8 (November 13)	Anouk	3	Neda Boin	"When You Believe"	Naomi Sharon Webster	—N/a	—N/a	—N/a	—N/a
Episode 8 (November 13)	Marco Borsato	4	Tibisay Mercera	"Survivor"	Babette van Vugt	—N/a	—N/a	—N/a	—N/a
Episode 8 (November 13)	Ali B	5	Ivar Vermeulen	"Lean On"	Danjil Tuhumena	—N/a	—N/a	—N/a	—N/a
Episode 8 (November 13)	Sanne Hans	6	Christie Middel	"FourFiveSeconds"	Jasper van Aarst	—N/a	—N/a	—N/a	—N/a
Episode 8 (November 13)	Anouk	7	Brandon Delagraentiss	"Dancing in the Street"	Tevin Raynor	—N/a	—N/a	—N/a	—N/a

== The Knockouts ==
New to this season is the introduction of the Knockout Round, which functions to replace the Clash Rounds of Season 5. During this round, coaches Sanne and Marco will advance three artists to the next stage of the competition, the Live Shows, while Anouk and Ali B will advance two and four artists, respectively. This is done to eliminate an equal number of artists across each team, ultimately sending twelve artists through to the Live Shows. In this round, in a format similar to The X Factor's Six-Seat Challenge, there will be three seats (two for Anouk and four for Ali B). After a contestant performs a song of his or her choice, he or she will sit in one of these seats; this will occur for the first three artists (two for Anouk, four for Ali B) performing on a team. However, after these first contestants perform, the fate of the fourth artist (third artist for Anouk and fifth artist for Ali B) will be decided based on whether his or her coach would like to switch out an artist already seated in favor of this performer. In the case of a switch-out, the artist that was switched out will be eliminated, and this performer will sit down. If the coach would instead like to keep the performers already seated and thus not give a seat to this performer, he or she will be immediately eliminated. After all artists have performed, those who end up seated will advance to the Live Shows.

Color key
– Contestant was eliminated, either immediately (indicated by a "—" in the "Switched with" column) or switched with another contestant
– Contestant was not switched out and advanced to the Live Shows

Artists' performances
Episode	Coach	Order	Artist	Song	Result	Switched with
Episode 9 (November 20)	Marco Borsato	1	Tibisay Mercera	"You Oughta Know"	Eliminated	—N/a
Episode 9 (November 20)	Marco Borsato	2	Jared Grant	"Cry Me a River"	Advanced	—N/a
Episode 9 (November 20)	Marco Borsato	3	Leonie Bos	"Just Like a Pill"	Eliminated	—N/a
Episode 9 (November 20)	Marco Borsato	4	Melissa Janssen	"Sweet Dreams" / "Sweet Dreams (Are Made of This)"	Advanced	Leonie Bos
Episode 9 (November 20)	Marco Borsato	5	Kelvin Muïs	"Human Nature"	Eliminated	Tibisay Mercera
Episode 9 (November 20)	Marco Borsato	6	Maan de Steenwinkel	"Holy Grail"	Advanced	Kelvin Muïs
Episode 9 (November 20)	Sanne Hans	7	Elise de Koning	"Break Free"	Eliminated	—N/a
Episode 9 (November 20)	Sanne Hans	8	Daniël Kist	"Liefs uit Londen"	Advanced	—N/a
Episode 9 (November 20)	Sanne Hans	9	Christie Middel	"Sober"	Eliminated	—N/a
Episode 9 (November 20)	Sanne Hans	10	Ivan Peroti	"Nothing Compares 2 U"	Advanced	Christie Middel
Episode 9 (November 20)	Sanne Hans	11	Nikita Pellencau	"Till It Hurts" / "Shotgun"	Eliminated	Elise de Koning
Episode 9 (November 20)	Sanne Hans	12	Dave Vermeulen	"Born to Be Wild"	Advanced	Nikita Pellencau
Episode 10 (November 27)	Ali B	1	Gaia Aikman	"Love Never Felt So Good"	Advanced	—N/a
Episode 10 (November 27)	Ali B	2	Racheal Botha	"Wavin' Flag"	Eliminated	—N/a
Episode 10 (November 27)	Ali B	3	Ivar Vermeulen	"Someone Like You"	Advanced	—N/a
Episode 10 (November 27)	Ali B	4	Maylissa Row	"Tell Me 'Bout It"	Eliminated	—N/a
Episode 10 (November 27)	Ali B	5	Brace	"Mag Ik Dan Bij Jou"	Advanced	Racheal Botha
Episode 10 (November 27)	Ali B	6	Natacha Carvalho	"Let Her Go"	Advanced	Maylissa Row
Episode 10 (November 27)	Ali B	7	Melissa Meewisse	"Don't Worry"	Eliminated	—
Episode 10 (November 27)	Anouk	8	Neda Boin	"Love Me Harder"	Advanced	—N/a
Episode 10 (November 27)	Anouk	9	Sanne Mallant	"Time to Say Goodbye"	Eliminated	—N/a
Episode 10 (November 27)	Anouk	10	Dali Philippo	"Teenage Dream"	Eliminated	—
Episode 10 (November 27)	Anouk	11	Jennie Lena	"All by Myself"	Advanced	Sanne Mallant
Episode 10 (November 27)	Anouk	12	Brandon Delagraentiss	"Respect"	Eliminated	—

== Live Shows ==
The final phase of the competition, the Live Shows, started on December 4, 2015. Unlike previous seasons, in which an equal number of contestants on each team were eliminated every week, results will apply to the contestants regardless of their teams.

Color key:

Artist was saved by the public's votes
Artist was eliminated

=== Week 1: Top 12 (December 4) ===
Order	Coach	Artist	Song	Result
1	Sanne Hans	Dave Vermeulen	"Sex Bomb"	Public's vote
2	Ali B	Natacha Carvalho	"We Don't Have to Take Our Clothes Off"	Eliminated
3	Marco Borsato	Maan de Steenwinkel	"Warrior"	Public's vote
4	Ali B	Brace	"Parijs"	Public's vote
5	Ali B	Gaia Aikman	"Runnin' (Lose It All)"	Eliminated
6	Sanne Hans	Daniël Kist	"Señorita"	Public's vote
7	Anouk	Neda Boin	"Beneath Your Beautiful"	Public's vote
8	Ali B	Ivar Vermeulen	"Sugar"	Public's vote
9	Anouk	Jennie Lena	"I'll Be There"	Public's vote
10	Marco Borsato	Melissa Janssen	"Ain't No Other Man"	Public's vote
11	Sanne Hans	Ivan Peroti	"Hello"	Public's vote
12	Marco Borsato	Jared Grant	"I Got You (I Feel Good)"	Public's vote

Non-competition performances
Order	Performer	Song
1	Jess Glynne and Team Anouk (Jennie Lena, Neda Boin)	"Rather Be" / "Don't Be So Hard on Yourself" / "Hold My Hand"
2	Jess Glynne	"Take Me Home"

=== Week 2: Top 10 (December 11) ===
This week, the one artist with the lowest number of public votes will be eliminated, leaving nine artists to compete the following week.

Order	Coach	Artist	Song	Result
1	Marco Borsato	Melissa Janssen	"Rolling in the Deep"	Public's vote
2	Sanne Hans	Daniël Kist	"Sorry"	Eliminated
3	Ali B	Ivar Vermeulen	"Nothing Really Matters"	Public's vote
4	Anouk	Neda Boin	"Stitches"	Public's vote
5	Marco Borsato	Jared Grant	"The Way You Make Me Feel"	Public's vote
6	Sanne Hans	Ivan Peroti	"Not Over You"	Public's vote
7	Marco Borsato	Maan de Steenwinkel	"Halo"	Public's vote
8	Anouk	Jennie Lena	"I Just Want to Make Love to You"	Public's vote
9	Sanne Hans	Dave Vermeulen	"Radar Love"	Public's vote
10	Ali B	Brace	"Margherita"	Public's vote

Non-competition performances
Order	Performer	Song
1	Gavin James (with Ivar Vermeulen and Ivan Peroti)	"The Book of Love"
2	Romy Monteiro	"I Will Always Love You"

=== Week 3: Top 9 (December 18) ===
Order	Coach	Artist	Song	Result
1	Ali B	Ivar Vermeulen	"War"	Public's vote
2	Anouk	Neda Boin	"Leave the Light On"	Eliminated
3	Marco Borsato	Jared Grant	"Uptown Funk"	Public's vote
4	Marco Borsato	Melissa Janssen	"Don't Let Go (Love)"	Public's vote
5	Ali B	Brace	"You Give Me Something" ("Jij Doet Iets Met Mij")^{1}	Public's vote
6	Sanne Hans	Ivan Peroti	"Higher Ground"	Public's vote
7	Sanne Hans	Dave Vermeulen	"Johnny B. Goode"	Public's vote
8	Anouk	Jennie Lena	"Vraag Jezelf Eens Af"	Public's vote
9	Marco Borsato	Maan de Steenwinkel	"How Deep Is Your Love"	Public's vote

Notes

1. This is a reworked Dutch version of James Morrison's "You Give Me Something".

Non-competition performances
Order	Performer	Song
1	Ellie Goulding (with Maan de Steenwinkel and Melissa Janssen)	"Love Me Like You Do"
2	Ellie Goulding	"On My Mind"

=== Week 4: Top 8 (January 8) ===
Order	Coach	Artist	Song	Result
1	Sanne Hans	Ivan Peroti	"This Is What It Feels Like"	Public's vote
2	Marco Borsato	Jared Grant	"A Song for You"	Public's vote
3	Anouk	Jennie Lena	"Locked Out of Heaven" / "Blessed & Highly Favored"	Public's vote
4	Sanne Hans	Dave Vermeulen	"I Won't Give Up"	Public's vote
5	Ali B	Ivar Vermeulen	"Waiting for Love"	Eliminated
6	Marco Borsato	Maan de Steenwinkel	"Let It Go"	Public's vote
7	Marco Borsato	Melissa Janssen	"Nobody's Wife"	Public's vote
8	Ali B	Brace	"Ik Hou Van Jou"	Public's vote

Non-competition performances
Order	Performer	Song
1	Hardwell and the Top 8	"Mad World"
2	Sanne Hans and her team (Dave Vermeulen, Ivan Peroti)	"Always on the Run"
3	Zara Larsson	"Never Forget You"

=== Week 5: Top 7 (January 15) ===
Order	Coach	Artist	Song	Result
1	Marco Borsato	Maan de Steenwinkel	"Theme from New York, New York" / "Empire State of Mind (Part II) Broken Down"	Public's vote
2	Sanne Hans	Ivan Peroti	"Wrecking Ball"	Eliminated
3	Sanne Hans	Dave Vermeulen	"What I Like About You"	Public's vote
4	Marco Borsato	Melissa Janssen	"Back to Black"	Public's vote
5	Ali B	Brace	"Ken Je Mij?"	Public's vote
6	Anouk	Jennie Lena	"Fields of Gold"	Public's vote
7	Marco Borsato	Jared Grant	"Can't Feel My Face"	Public's vote

Non-competition performances
Order	Performer	Song
1	The Top 7	"With a Little Help from My Friends"
2	Jennie Lena and Ivan Peroti	"Let's Dance" / "This is Not America"^{1}
3	Matt Simons (with Dave Vermeulen, Jared Grant, and Ivan Peroti)	"Catch & Release"

Notes

1. To commemorate singer David Bowie after his death, Jennie Lena and Ivan Peroti, accompanied on piano by Jamai Loman, performed "Let's Dance" and "This is Not America" respectively backstage.

=== Week 6: Semi-Final - Top 6 (January 22) ===
This week, after all of the artists have performed their first songs, one artist will be eliminated based on the ongoing public vote. A second artist will then be eliminated after the second round of performances. Ultimately, four artists will advance to the finale.

Due to the eliminations of Jared Grant and Melissa Janssen, this is the first time in two seasons that each coach will have equal representation in the finale.

Order	Coach	Artist	First Song	Result	Order	Second Song	Result
1	Marco Borsato	Jared Grant	"Are You Gonna Go My Way" / "I Want to Take You Higher"	Eliminated	N/A (already eliminated)		
2	Ali B	Brace	"Toen Ik Je Zag"	Public's vote	11	"Beauty and the Brains"	Public's vote
3	Marco Borsato	Melissa Janssen	"Euphoria"	Public's vote	9	"Always"	Eliminated
4	Marco Borsato	Maan de Steenwinkel	"Say My Name"	Public's vote	7	"I Don't Believe You"	Public's vote
5	Anouk	Jennie Lena	"Bloed, zweet en tranen"	Public's vote	10	"Fix You"	Public's vote
6	Sanne Hans	Dave Vermeulen	"(I Can't Get No) Satisfaction"	Public's vote	8	"All Summer Long" / "Sweet Home Alabama"	Public's vote

Non-competition performances
Order	Performer	Song
1	Charlie Puth (with Maan de Steenwinkel and Melissa Janssen)	"Marvin Gaye"
2	Ali B and Brace	"Fun"
3	Charlie Puth	"One Call Away"

=== Week 7: Final (January 29) ===
Order	Coach	Artist	First song	Order	Second song	Order	Original song	Result
1	Sanne Hans	Dave Vermeulen	"Call Me the Breeze"	6	"Wicked Way" (with Waylon)	10	"Found Myself a Home"	Runner-up
2	Ali B	Brace	"Mi Rowsu" (with Jan Smit)	5	"Flink Zijn"	9	"Alleen"	Third place
3	Marco Borsato	Maan de Steenwinkel	"Halo"	7	"Voorbij" (with Marco Borsato)	11	"Perfect World"	Winner
4	Anouk	Jennie Lena	"I Got You Babe" (with Douwe Bob)	8	"I Want You Back"	N/A	N/A (Already eliminated)	Fourth place

Non-competition performances
Order	Performer	Song
1	Top 40 contestants	"You're The Voice"
2	Fleur East	"Sax"
3	Mike Posner	"I Took a Pill in Ibiza"

Notes

1. The 4 Finalists (Jennie Lena, Brace, Maan de Steenwinkel, and Dave Vermeulen) sang "You're the Voice", while all of the previously eliminated artists accompanied them with background vocals.

== Elimination Chart ==
=== Overall ===
Color key
Artist's info

- Artist from Team Anouk
- Artist from Team Ali B
- Artist from Team Sanne
- Artist from Team Borsato

Result details

- Winner
- Runner-up
- Third place
- Fourth place
- Artist was saved by the public vote
- Artist was eliminated

Live show results per week
Artist	Week 1	Week 2	Week 3	Week 4	Week 5	Week 6		Finals
Artist	Week 1	Week 2	Week 3	Week 4	Week 5	Round 1	Round 2	Finals
Maan de Steenwinkel	Safe	Safe	Safe	Safe	Safe	Safe	Safe	Winner
Dave Vermeulen	Safe	Safe	Safe	Safe	Safe	Safe	Safe	Runner-up
Brace	Safe	Safe	Safe	Safe	Safe	Safe	Safe	3rd Place
Jennie Lena	Safe	Safe	Safe	Safe	Safe	Safe	Safe	4th Place
Melissa Janssen	Safe	Safe	Safe	Safe	Safe	Safe	Eliminated	
Jared Grant	Safe	Safe	Safe	Safe	Safe	Eliminated		
Ivan Peroti	Safe	Safe	Safe	Safe	Eliminated			
Ivar Vermeulen	Safe	Safe	Safe	Eliminated				
Neda Boin	Safe	Safe	Eliminated					
Daniël Kist	Safe	Eliminated						
Gaia Aikman	Eliminated							
Natacha Carvalho	Eliminated							

=== Team ===
Color key
Artist's info

- Artist from Team Anouk
- Artist from Team Ali B
- Artist from Team Sanne
- Artist from Team Borsato

Result details

- Winner
- Runner-up
- Third place
- Fourth place
- Eliminated

Live show results per week
Artist	Week 1	Week 2	Week 3	Week 4	Week 5	Week 6		Finals
Artist	Week 1	Week 2	Week 3	Week 4	Week 5	Round 1	Round 2	Finals
Jennie Lena	Advanced	Advanced	Advanced	Advanced	Advanced	Advanced	Advanced	4th Place
Neda Boin	Advanced	Advanced	Eliminated					
Brace	Advanced	Advanced	Advanced	Advanced	Advanced	Advanced	Advanced	3rd Place
Ivar Vermeulen	Advanced	Advanced	Advanced	Eliminated				
Gaia Aikman	Eliminated							
Natacha Carvalho	Eliminated							
Dave Vermeulen	Advanced	Advanced	Advanced	Advanced	Advanced	Advanced	Advanced	Runner-up
Ivan Peroti	Advanced	Advanced	Advanced	Advanced	Eliminated			
Daniël Kist	Advanced	Eliminated						
Maan de Steenwinkel	Advanced	Advanced	Advanced	Advanced	Advanced	Advanced	Advanced	Winner
Melissa Janssen	Advanced	Advanced	Advanced	Advanced	Advanced	Advanced	Eliminated	
Jared Grant	Advanced	Advanced	Advanced	Advanced	Advanced	Eliminated		

== Artists' appearances in other media ==
- Danjil Tuhumena and Babette van Vugt turned chairs in Seasons 2 and 3 respectively, with the former competing on Team Nick en Simon and the latter on Team Borsato. Both were later eliminated in the Live Shows.
- Melissa Meewisse participated in the inaugural season of The Voice Kids on Team Borsato in 2011. She was eliminated in the final round.
- Kelvin Muïs placed third in the third season of the Dutch version of the reality singing competition, The X Factor, in 2010 as part of the "Boys" category.
- Gaia Aikman and Dali Philippo participated in the Dutch singing competition Junior Songfestival in 2007 and 2013, respectively.
- Melissa Janssen won the first season of the Dutch reality singing competition The Next Pop Talent in 2013.

== Episodes ==
No.	Episode	Air date
1	"Blind Auditions 1"	25 September 2015
2	"Blind Auditions 2"	2 October 2015
3	"Blind Auditions 3"	9 October 2015
4	"Blind Auditions 4"	16 October 2015
5	"Blind Auditions 5"	23 October 2015
6	"Battle Rounds 1"	30 October 2015
7	"Battle Rounds 2"	6 November 2015
8	"Battle Rounds 3"	13 November 2015
9	"Knockouts 1"	20 November 2015
10	"Knockouts 2"	27 November 2015
11	"Live Show 1"	4 December 2015
12	"Live Show 2"	11 December 2015
13	"Live Show 3"	18 December 2015
14	"Live Show 4"	8 January 2016
15	"Live Show 5"	15 January 2016
16	"Semi-Final"	22 January 2016
17	"Final"	29 January 2016
