= The Voice of Holland season 7 =

The Voice of Holland
- Season 7
- Hosted by: Martijn Krabbé; Wendy van Dijk; Jamai Loman (backstage)
- Coaches: Waylon; Guus Meeuwis; Ali B Sanne Hans
- Winner: Pleun Bierbooms
- Winning coach: Waylon
- Runner-up: Isabel Provoost

Release
- Original network: RTL 4
- Original release: 21 October 2016 – 17 February 2017

Season chronology
- ← Previous; Season 6 Next → Season 8

The seventh season of the Dutch reality singing competition The Voice of Holland premiered on 21 October 2016 on RTL 4. Martijn Krabbé, Wendy van Dijk, and Jamai Loman all returned, as did Sanne Hans and Ali B as coaches. For this season, however, coaches Marco Borsato and Anouk were replaced by singers Guus Meeuwis and Waylon, respectively.

One of the important premises of the show is the quality of the singing talent. Four coaches, themselves popular performing artists, train the talents in their group and occasionally perform with them. Talents are selected in blind auditions, where the coaches cannot see, but only hear the auditioner.

Pleun Bierbooms won the competition and Waylon became the winning coach.

== Coaches ==
Sanne Hans and Ali B have returned for season 7. Dutch singers Waylon and Guus Meeuwis replace former judges Marco Borsato and Anouk.

== Teams ==
Color key

– Winner
– Runner-up
– Third place
– Fourth place

– Eliminated in the Live Shows
– Eliminated in the Knockout Rounds
– Artist was stolen by another coach (Name is strikethroughed)
– Artist was stolen but was later switched with another artist and got eliminated
– Eliminated in the Battle Rounds

Coaches	Top 50 Artists				
Waylon					
Waylon	Pleun Bierbooms	Yerry Rellum	Romy Weevers	Dilana Smith	Jordan Roy
Waylon	Nikki Nola	Stephan Bouwman	~~Maik IJpelaar~~	~~Oumnia Guigui~~	Chirine Aliani
Waylon	Jane Talany	Irene Hin	Mireille Komproe	SaraLee Vos	
Sanne Hans					
Sanne Hans	Isabel Provoost	Kirsten Berkx	Sheela	Baggio	Ina van Woersem
Sanne Hans	Jacob Grey	Maik IJpelaar	~~Nikki Nola~~	Daniël van Schaick	Erik Frisberg
Sanne Hans	Esri Elianne	Hannah Stradmeijer	Tom Schraven		
Ali B					
Ali B	Vinchenzo Tahapary	Dwight Dissels	Roza Lozica	Danny Kalima	Josephine Rojer
Ali B	Oumnia Guigui	Sydney van der Meij	~~Leon Sherman~~	Chimobi	Emma van Helsdingen
Ali B	Charlotte Masmeijer	Jennifer Cooke	Khadisha Reed	Rudebeats	
Guus Meeuwis					
Guus Meeuwis	Thijs Pot	Leon Sherman	Katell Chevalier	Annemarie Brohm	John Vooijs
Guus Meeuwis	Stephanie van Rooijen	Zoë de Sanders	Nils Krake	CPG	Melany Sharon
Guus Meeuwis	Mike Ott	Rachel Kramer	Vannessa Thuyns		
Note: Italicized names are stolen contestants.

== Blind auditions ==
Color key

✔	Coach hit his/her "I WANT YOU" button
	Artist defaulted to this coach's team
	Artist elected to join this coach's team
	Artist eliminated with no coach pressing his or her "I WANT YOU" button

=== Episode 1 (21 October) ===
Order	Artist	Age	Song	Coaches' and contestants' choices			
Order	Artist	Age	Song	Waylon	Sanne	Ali B	Guus
1	CPG (Jacqueline, Peggy, and Gitty)	37/37/42	"I'm So Excited"	—	✔	✔	✔
2	Baggio	19	"Does Your Mother Know"	✔	✔	✔	✔
3	Daisy van Barneveld	23	"Wake Me Up"	—	—	—	—
4	Vinchenzo	17	"Thinking Out Loud"	✔	✔	✔	✔
5	Mireille Komproe	23	"Bang Bang"	✔	✔	✔	✔
6	Rachel Kramer	36	"We've Got Tonight"	—	—	✔	✔
7	Joggo	35	"Rude"	—	—	—	—
8	Sheela	26	"Dirty Diana"	—	✔	✔	✔
9	Stephan Bouwman	26	"Let It Go"	✔	✔	✔	✔
10	Charlotte Masmeijer	21	"Valerie"	—	—	✔	—
11	Dwight Dissels	35	"End of the Road"	✔	✔	✔	✔

=== Episode 2 (28 October) ===
Order	Artist	Age	Song	Coaches' and contestants' choices			
Order	Artist	Age	Song	Waylon	Sanne	Ali B	Guus
1	Yerry Rellum	45	"Crazy"	✔	✔	✔	✔
2	Catali	23	"Desperado"	—	—	—	—
3	Kirsten Berkx	25	"Seven Nation Army"	✔	✔	✔	✔
4	Danny Kalima	26	"Happy"	—	—	✔	✔
5	Nikki Nola	32	"Feeling Good"	—	✔	—	—
6	Tim Verhaal	21	"Skyfall"	—	—	—	—
7	Oumnia Guigui	21	"Good God"	✔	✔	—	—
8	Esri	28	"Hold Back the River"	✔	✔	✔	✔
9	Melany Sharon	25	"Ik Huil Alleen Bij Jou"	—	✔	✔	✔
10	John Vooijs	37	"Best Fake Smile"	✔	✔	✔	✔
11	Dilana Smith	44	"Roxanne"	✔	✔	✔	✔

=== Episode 3 (4 November) ===
Order	Artist	Age	Song	Coaches' and contestants' choices			
Order	Artist	Age	Song	Waylon	Sanne	Ali B	Guus
1	Ina van Woersem	19	"The Way You Make Me Feel"	✔	✔	✔	✔
2	Jacob Grey	27	"Back to Black"	✔	✔	✔	✔
3	Jane Talany	53	"Don't Look Down"	✔	✔	—	—
4	Danilo Kuiters	19	"Werd de Tijd Maar Teruggedraaid"	—	—	—	—
5	Vannessa Thuyns	41	"Slow Down"	✔	✔	✔	✔
6	Siger van Ramshorst	22	"Dat Komt Door Jou"	—	—	—	—
7	Khadisha Reed	19	"No"	—	✔	✔	✔
8	Mike Ott	20	"One Call Away"	—	✔	—	✔
9	Lisa van der Ven	18	"Run to You"	—	—	—	—
10	Isabel Provoost	17	"Modern World"	—	✔	✔	✔
11	Thomas Staples	29	"Dance With Somebody"	—	—	—	—
12	Katell Chevalier	31	"Formidable"	✔	✔	✔	✔

=== Episode 4 (11 November) ===
Order	Artist	Age	Song	Coaches' and contestants' choices			
Order	Artist	Age	Song	Waylon	Sanne	Ali B	Guus
1	Roza Lozica	26	"How Come You Don't Call Me"	—	✔	✔	✔
2	Irene Hin	20	"Royals"	✔	—	✔	—
3	Rudebeats	29	"No Diggity"	—	✔	✔	✔
4	SaraLee Vos	37	"Hey Ya"	✔	—	—	—
5	Tialda van Slogteren	31	"People Help the People"	—	—	—	—
6	Sascha Salvati	32	"Firestone"	—	—	—	—
7	Natascha Vergeer	22	"Be the One"	—	—	—	—
8	Daniël van Schaick	28	"California Dreamin'"	✔	✔	✔	✔
9	Annemarie Brohm	32	"What's Up"	—	—	✔	✔
10	Bertrie Wieringa	26	"Style"	—	—	—	—
11	Erik Frisberg	31	"Let's Stay Together"	✔	✔	✔	✔
12	Pleun Bierbooms	18	"Million Years Ago"	✔	✔	✔	✔

=== Episode 5 (18 November) ===
Order	Artist	Age	Song	Coaches' and contestants' choices			
Order	Artist	Age	Song	Waylon	Sanne	Ali B	Guus
1	Stephanie van Rooijen	23	"Kom Maar Bij Mij"	✔	✔	✔	✔
2	Roxanne Hartog	20	"Almost Is Never Enough"	—	—	—	—
3	Jennifer Cooke	29	"Survivor"	—	—	✔	✔
4	Nils Krake	31	"All I Ask"	—	✔	✔	✔
5	Romy Weevers	16	"All I Want"	✔	✔	✔	—
6	Mario Raadwijk	40	"Vraag Jezelf Eens Af"	—	—	—	—
7	Maik IJpelaar	23	"Is This Love"	✔	—	—	—
8	Josephine Rojer	29	"Love Yourself"	—	✔	✔	✔
9	Sem Rooijakkers	19	"Fast Car"	—	—	—	—
10	Chimobi	24	"Sugar"	—	✔	✔	—
11	Jordan Roy	29	"Man in the Mirror"	✔	✔	✔	✔

=== Episode 6 (25 November) ===
Order	Artist	Age	Song	Coaches' and contestants' choices			
Order	Artist	Age	Song	Waylon	Sanne	Ali B	Guus
1	Thijs Pot	18	"As Long as You Love Me"	—	✔	—	✔
2	Hannah Stradmeijer	19	"Ain't Nobody"	—	✔	—	—
3	Leon Sherman	32	"When I Was Your Man"	✔	✔	✔	✔
4	Nina Broekema	20	"Don't Dream It's Over"	—	—	—	—
5	Chirine Aliani	20	"Stone Cold"	✔	✔	—	—
6	Shay Lachman	20	"Mooi"	—	—	—	—
7	Zoë de Sanders	19	"Set Fire to the Rain"	—	—	—	✔
8	Sydney van der Meij	23	"Run"	—	✔	✔	—
9	Japie Stoppelenburg	28	"Break Free"	—	—	—	—
10	Emma van Helsdingen	17	"Vision of Love"	—	—	✔	✔
11	Tom Schraven	28	"Love Runs Out"	✔	✔	✔	✔

== The Battle Rounds ==
The Battle Rounds determine which artists from each team will advance to the Knockout Rounds. Two artists from within a team (and, for Team Waylon and Team Ali B, a group of three artists) will sing in a vocal battle against one other, and ultimately, six artists from each team will advance. New to this season, however, is the introduction of the Steal Room. While steals have returned, each artist that is stolen this season will sit in a designated seat in the Steal Room as they watch the other performances. If a coach has stolen one artist but later decides to steal another, the first artist will be replaced and eliminated by the newly-stolen artist.

Color key:

Artist won the Battle and advanced to the Knockout Rounds
Artist lost the Battle and was stolen by another coach, but was later switched with another artist and eliminated
Artist lost the Battle but was stolen by another coach and advanced to the Knockout Rounds
Artist lost the Battle and was eliminated

Episode	Coach	Order	Winner	Song	Loser	'Steal' result			
Episode	Coach	Order	Winner	Song	Loser	Waylon	Sanne	Ali B	Guus
Episode 7 (2 December)	Guus Meeuwis	1	Annemarie Brohm	"Free Your Mind"	CPG	—	—	—	—N/a
Episode 7 (2 December)	Ali B	2	Vinchenzo Tahapary	"I See Fire"	Chimobi	✔	✔	—N/a	✔
Episode 7 (2 December)	Sanne Hans	3	Isabel Provoost	"I Kissed a Girl"	Esri Elianne	—	—N/a	—	—
Episode 7 (2 December)	Waylon	4	Pleun Bierbooms	"Love Me Like You Do"	Jane Talany	—N/a	—	✔	—
Episode 7 (2 December)	Guus Meeuwis	5	John Vooijs	"Shut Up and Dance"	Nils Krake	—	✔	—	—N/a
Episode 7 (2 December)	Waylon	6	Romy Weevers	"Brave"	Chirine Aliani	—N/a	—	—	—
Episode 7 (2 December)	Waylon	6	Romy Weevers	"Brave"	Irene Hin	—N/a	—	—	—
Episode 7 (2 December)	Sanne Hans	7	Kirsten Berkx	"Black Velvet"	Nikki Nola	✔	—N/a	—	—
Episode 7 (2 December)	Ali B	8	Dwight Dissels	"How Come, How Long"	Leon Sherman	✔	✔	—N/a	✔
Episode 8 (9 December)	Ali B	1	Danny Kalima	"Bailando"	Rudebeats	—	—	—N/a	—
Episode 8 (9 December)	Sanne Hans	2	Sheela	"Never Forget You"	Hannah Stradmeijer	—	—N/a	—	—
Episode 8 (9 December)	Waylon	3	Yerry Rellum	"FourFiveSeconds"	Oumnia Guigui	—N/a	—	✔	—
Episode 8 (9 December)	Guus Meeuwis	4	Stephanie van Rooijen	"Toen Ik Je Zag"	Melany Sharon	—	—	—	—N/a
Episode 8 (9 December)	Sanne Hans	5	Jacob Grey	"Treat You Better"	Tom Schraven	—	—N/a	—	—
Episode 8 (9 December)	Waylon	6	Dilana Smith	"Dark Horse"	SaraLee Vos	—N/a	—	—	—
Episode 8 (9 December)	Guus Meeuwis	7	Katell Chevalier	"Nothing Compares 2 U"	Rachel Kramer	—	—	—	—N/a
Episode 8 (9 December)	Ali B	8	Sydney van der Meij	"Only Girl (In the World)"	Emma van Helsdingen	—	✔	—N/a	—
Episode 8 (9 December)	Ali B	8	Sydney van der Meij	"Only Girl (In the World)"	Charlotte Masmeijer	—	—	—N/a	—
Episode 9 (16 December)	Sanne Hans	1	Baggio	"Let Me Entertain You"	Daniël van Schaick	—	—N/a	—	—
Episode 9 (16 December)	Ali B	2	Josephine Rojer	"Next to Me"	Jennifer Cooke	—	—	—N/a	—
Episode 9 (16 December)	Guus Meeuwis	3	Thijs Pot	"Geronimo"	Mike Ott	—	—	—	—N/a
Episode 9 (16 December)	Waylon	4	Stephan Bouwman	"Rumour Has It"	Maik IJpelaar	—N/a	✔	—	—
Episode 9 (16 December)	Sanne Hans	5	Ina van Woersem	"Want to Want Me"	Erik Frisberg	—	—N/a	—	—
Episode 9 (16 December)	Guus Meeuwis	6	Zoë de Sanders	"Promise Me"	Vannessa Thuyns	—	—	—	—N/a
Episode 9 (16 December)	Ali B	7	Roza Lozica	"Tears"	Khadisha Reed	—	—	—N/a	—
Episode 9 (16 December)	Waylon	8	Jordan Roy	"Sugar"	Mireille Komproe	—N/a	—	—	—

== The Knockouts ==
Continuing from season 6, the Knockout Round determines which three artists from each team will advance to the final round of competition, the Live Shows. In this round, after an artist performs, he or she will sit in one of three seats above the stage. The first three artists performing from each team will sit down, but once the fourth artist performs, a coach has the choice of replacing the fourth artist with any artist sitting down or eliminating them immediately. Once all artists have performed, those who remain seated will advance to the Live Shows.

Color key
– Contestant was eliminated, either immediately (indicated by a "—" in the "Switched with" column) or switched with another contestant
– Contestant was not switched out and advanced to the Live Shows

Artists' performances
Episode	Coach	Order	Artist	Song	Result	Switched with
Episode 10 (23 December)	Ali B	1	Danny Kalima	"Beggin'"	Eliminated	—N/a
Episode 10 (23 December)	Ali B	2	Oumnia Guigui	"Ain't Nobody"	Eliminated	—N/a
Episode 10 (23 December)	Ali B	3	Roza Lozica	"When We Were Young"	Advanced	—N/a
Episode 10 (23 December)	Ali B	4	Dwight Dissels	"All of Me"	Advanced	Oumnia Guigui
Episode 10 (23 December)	Ali B	5	Sydney van der Meij	"Habits (Stay High)"	Eliminated	—
Episode 10 (23 December)	Ali B	6	Vinchenzo Tahapary	"Waves"	Advanced	Danny Kalima
Episode 10 (23 December)	Ali B	7	Josephine Rojer	"Shake Your Body (Down to the Ground)"	Eliminated	—
Episode 10 (23 December)	Guus Meeuwis	1	Zoë de Sanders	"No More Drama"	Eliminated	—N/a
Episode 10 (23 December)	Guus Meeuwis	2	Thijs Pot	"Demons"	Advanced	—N/a
Episode 10 (23 December)	Guus Meeuwis	3	Katell Chevalier	"Amsterdam"	Advanced	—N/a
Episode 10 (23 December)	Guus Meeuwis	4	Annemarie Brohm	"Hotter than Hell"	Eliminated	Zoë de Sanders
Episode 10 (23 December)	Guus Meeuwis	5	Leon Sherman	"Run to You"	Advanced	Annemarie Brohm
Episode 10 (23 December)	Guus Meeuwis	6	Stephanie van Rooijen	"Je Hoeft Niet Naar Huis Vannacht"	Eliminated	—
Episode 10 (23 December)	Guus Meeuwis	7	John Vooijs	"You Give Me Something"	Eliminated	—
Episode 11 (6 January)	Sanne Hans	1	Ina van Woersem	"I Want You Back"	Eliminated	—N/a
Episode 11 (6 January)	Sanne Hans	2	Kirsten Berkx	"Toxic"	Advanced	—N/a
Episode 11 (6 January)	Sanne Hans	3	Jacob Grey	"Wonderful World"	Eliminated	—N/a
Episode 11 (6 January)	Sanne Hans	4	Isabel Provoost	"Big Girls Don't Cry"	Advanced	Jacob Grey
Episode 11 (6 January)	Sanne Hans	5	Sheela	"Dangerous Woman"	Advanced	Ina van Woersem
Episode 11 (6 January)	Sanne Hans	6	Maik IJpelaar	"Locked Out of Heaven"	Eliminated	—
Episode 11 (6 January)	Sanne Hans	7	Baggio	"Surfin' U.S.A."	Eliminated	—
Episode 11 (6 January)	Waylon	1	Yerry Rellum	"Human"	Advanced	—N/a
Episode 11 (6 January)	Waylon	2	Stephan Bouwman	"Stitches"	Eliminated	—N/a
Episode 11 (6 January)	Waylon	3	Nikki Nola	"Super Duper Love"	Eliminated	—N/a
Episode 11 (6 January)	Waylon	4	Dilana Smith	"It Must Have Been Love"	Eliminated	Stephan Bouwman
Episode 11 (6 January)	Waylon	5	Pleun Bierbooms	"Don't Be So Shy"	Advanced	Nikki Nola
Episode 11 (6 January)	Waylon	6	Jordan Roy	"The Edge of Heaven"	Eliminated	Dilana Smith
Episode 11 (6 January)	Waylon	7	Romy Weevers	"Skinny Love"	Advanced	Jordan Roy

== The Live Shows ==
The final phase of the competition, the Live Shows, began on 13 January 2017 and lasted until 17 February 2017. A new feature of the Live Shows is the judging of each performance by all four coaches with a number from one to ten. This number will then be averaged and combined with the public vote, ultimately giving a score to each artist. The six artists with the highest scores will be immediately saved, while the six artists with the lowest scores will be at risk of elimination. The public vote then determines which two artists among the six at risk will be eliminated.

Color key
– Artist had one of the six lowest scores and was eliminated
– Artist's score was among the top six, advancing them to the next Live round
– Artist was voted through by the public vote after having one of the six lowest scores

=== Week 1: Top 12 (13 January) ===
Order	Coach	Artist	Song	Coaches' scores					Public vote score	Total score	Result
Order	Coach	Artist	Song	Waylon	Sanne Hans	Ali B	Guus	Average score	Public vote score	Total score	Result
1	Guus Meeuwis	Leon Sherman	"Love Runs Out"	8.0	7.5	7.0	9.0	7.88	7.82	15.70	Advanced
2	Sanne Hans	Kirsten Berkx	"It's Oh So Quiet"	6.5	9.0	8.0	8.0	7.88	7.93	15.81	Advanced
3	Ali B	Roza Lozica	"In the Name of Love"	7.0	7.0	8.5	7.5	7.5	6.84	14.34	Eliminated
4	Waylon	Romy Weevers	"Unwritten"	8.5	6.5	6.5	7.0	7.13	6.13	13.26	Advanced
5	Ali B	Dwight Dissels	"Bridge Over Troubled Water"	7.5	9.0	9.5	8.0	8.5	8.15	16.65	Advanced
6	Guus Meeuwis	Thijs Pot	"Let Me Love You"	9.0	7.5	5.5	8.5	7.63	6.22	13.85	Advanced
7	Waylon	Pleun Bierbooms	"Writing's on the Wall"	9.5	9.0	9.0	8.0	8.88	8.69	17.57	Advanced
8	Sanne Hans	Sheela	"Sax"	7.0	7.5	6.5	6.5	6.88	6.05	12.93	Eliminated
9	Ali B	Vinchenzo Tahapary	"Mercy"	8.0	8.5	9.0	8.5	8.5	8.29	16.79	Advanced
10	Guus Meeuwis	Katell Chevalier	"Hello (French Version)"	6.0	8.0	8.0	9.0	7.75	6.47	14.22	Advanced
11	Sanne Hans	Isabel Provoost	"Starving"	8.5	8.5	7.0	7.0	7.75	8.46	16.21	Advanced
12	Waylon	Yerry Rellum	"Kiss"	9.0	8.0	8.5	8.0	8.38	6.73	15.11	Advanced

Non-competition performances
Order	Performer	Song
1	Kensington and Leon and Dwight	"Do I Ever"
2	Jamai and the Top 12	"Freedom"^{1}
3	Kensington	"Sorry"

Notes

1. Backstage performance

=== Week 2: Top 10 (20 January) ===
Order	Coach	Artist	Song	Coaches' scores					Public vote score	Total score	Result
Order	Coach	Artist	Song	Waylon	Sanne Hans	Ali B	Guus	Average score	Public vote score	Total score	Result
1	Ali B	Vinchenzo Tahapary	"Sing"	9.0	8.0	9.0	8.0	8.5	8.48	16.98	Advanced
2	Sanne Hans	Isabel Provoost	"Fallin'"	7.5	8.5	8.0	8.0	8.0	7.65	15.65	Advanced
3	Waylon	Yerry Rellum	"You're the First, the Last, My Everything"	9.0	8.0	8.0	8.0	8.25	7.69	15.94	Advanced
4	Guus Meeuwis	Thijs Pot	"Dancing on My Own"	8.5	9.0	8.5	9.0	8.75	7.41	16.16	Advanced
5	Waylon	Pleun Bierbooms	"The Edge of Glory"	9.0	8.0	8.0	7.5	8.13	8.27	16.40	Advanced
6	Guus Meeuwis	Katell Chevalier	"Brabant"	8.0	8.5	8.0	8.5	8.25	6.20	14.45	Eliminated
7	Ali B	Dwight Dissels	"I Won't Give Up"	7.5	9.0	10.0	8.5	8.75	8.63	17.38	Advanced
8	Waylon	Romy Weevers	"Don't Let Me Down"	10.0	7.5	7.5	7.5	8.13	6.55	14.68	Eliminated
9	Sanne Hans	Kirsten Berkx	"Birds"	8.5	10.0	8.5	8.0	8.75	8.19	16.94	Advanced
10	Guus Meeuwis	Leon Sherman	"Somebody to Love"	8.0	9.5	7.5	9.5	8.63	8.66	17.29	Advanced

Non-competition performances
Order	Performer	Song
1	Emeli Sandé and Isabel, Pleun, Romy, Kirsten and Katell	"Clown / Read All About It"
2	Emeli Sandé and all talents	"Next To Me "^{1}
3	Emeli Sandé	"Breathing Underwater"

Notes

1. Backstage performance

=== Week 3: Top 8 (27 January) ===
Order	Coach	Artist	Song	Coaches' scores					Public vote score	Total score	Result
Order	Coach	Artist	Song	Waylon	Sanne Hans	Ali B	Guus	Average score	Public vote score	Total score	Result
1	Sanne Hans	Kirsten Berkx	"Jolene"	7.5	9.0	7.5	8.0	8.0	6.94	14.94	Eliminated
2	Guus Meeuwis	Thijs Pot	"Castle on the Hill"	7.5	8.0	7.5	9.0	8.0	6.40	14.40	Advanced
3	Waylon	Pleun Bierbooms	"Rise"	9.5	9.0	9.5	9.0	9.25	8.71	17.96	Advanced
4	Ali B	Vinchenzo Tahapary	"Love Me Now"	8.0	8.5	9.5	8.5	8.63	8.53	17.16	Advanced
5	Sanne Hans	Isabel Provoost	"Iris"	8.0	9.0	8.0	8.0	8.25	7.61	15.86	Advanced
6	Waylon	Yerry Rellum	"Dancing on the Ceiling"	9.0	8.5	8.0	7.5	8.25	7.21	15.46	Advanced
7	Guus Meeuwis	Leon Sherman	"All I Ask"	7.5	9.0	9.0	9.0	8.63	8.35	16.98	Advanced
8	Ali B	Dwight Dissels	"Blow Me Away"	9.0	8.5	9.0	8.5	8.75	8.29	17.04	Advanced

Non-competition performances
Order	Performer	Song
1	Ali B and Vinchenzo and Dwight	"Let's Go"
2	Jamai and Pleun, Vinchenzo, Thijs and Isabel	"One Dance"^{1}
3	Cast 'The Lion King'	"Circle of Life"

Notes

1. Backstage performance

=== Week 4: Top 7 (3 February) ===
Order	Coach	Artist	Song	Coaches' scores					Public vote score	Total score	Result
Order	Coach	Artist	Song	Waylon	Sanne Hans	Ali B	Guus	Average score	Public vote score	Total score	Result
1	Guus Meeuwis	Thijs Pot	"Another Love"	8.0	8.0	8.0	9.5	8.38	7.25	15.63	Advanced
2	Ali B	Dwight Dissels	"When I Get You Alone"	8.0	8.5	9.0	8.5	8.5	7.64	16.14	Advanced
3	Sanne Hans	Isabel Provoost	"Sweet Goodbyes"	9.5	9.5	8.0	8.0	8.75	8.57	17.32	Advanced
4	Guus Meeuwis	Leon Sherman	"Sex on Fire"	8.5	9.0	8.5	9.5	8.88	8.33	17.21	Advanced
5	Waylon	Yerry Rellum	"Rolling in the Deep"	9.0	8.0	8.0	8.5	8.38	7.01	15.39	Eliminated
6	Ali B	Vinchenzo Tahapary	"Say You Won't Let Go"	9.0	9.0	9.5	9.0	9.13	8.75	17.88	Advanced
7	Waylon	Pleun Bierbooms	"What Now"	10.0	8.5	9.0	9.0	9.13	9.11	18.24	Advanced

Non-competition performances
Order	Performer	Song
1	Waylon with Pleun and Yerry	"Our Song"
2	Gavin James and Pleun and Isabel	"The Book of Love"^{1}
3	Gavin James and Thijs and Leon	"Nervous"
4	Maan de Steenwinkel	"Someone That I Never Knew"

Notes

1. Backstage performance

=== Week 5: Semi-Final – Top 6 (10 February) ===
Order	Coach	Artist	First Song	Result	Order	Second Song	Result
1	Sanne Hans	Isabel Provoost	"Hurt"	Public's vote	8	"Set Fire To The Rain"	Public's vote
2	Ali B	Dwight Dissels	"All My Life"	Public's vote	10	"Another Day"	Eliminated
3	Guus Meeuwis	Leon Sherman	"Dirty Diana"	Eliminated	N/A (already eliminated)		
4	Guus Meeuwis	Thijs Pot	"This Town"	Public's vote	7	"Just the Way You Are"	Public's vote
5	Ali B	Vinchenzo Tahapary	"The A Team"	Public's vote	9	"Pillowtalk"	Public's vote
6	Waylon	Pleun Bierbooms	"One Last Time"	Public's vote	11	"The Voice Within"	Public's vote

Non-competition performances
Order	Performer	Song
1	Bebe Rexha with Isabel, Pleun, Leon and Vinchenzo	"In The Name Of Love"/"Hey Mama"
2	JP Cooper	"Perfect Strangers"^{1}
3	JP Cooper	"September Song"
4	Bebe Rexha	"I Got You"

Notes

1. Backstage performance

=== Week 6: Final (17 February) ===
Order	Coach	Artist	First song	Order	Second song	Order	Single	Result
1	Waylon	Pleun Bierbooms	"Writing's on the Wall"	5	"From This Moment" (with Waylon)	9	"What Hurts The Most"	Winner
2	Sanne Hans	Isabel Provoost	"Big Girls Don't Cry"	6	"Omarm Me" (with Paskal)	11	"Nothing"	Runner-up
3	Ali B	Vinchenzo Tahapary	"Say You Won't Let Go"	7	"Energie" (with Ronnie Flex)	10	"Steady Love"	Third place
4	Guus Meeuwis	Thijs Pot	"Let Me Love You"	8	"Dat Komt Door Jou" (with Guus Meeuwis)	N/A	N/A (Already eliminated)	Fourth place

Non-competition performances
Order	Performer	Song
1	Armin Van Buuren with the finalists	"Heading Up High"
2	Lukas Graham with Pleun and Isabel	"7 Years"
3	Jamai with the finalists	"The Greatest Love of All"^{1}
4	Armin Van Buuren with Vinchenzo and Thijs	"I Need You"
5	Lukas Graham	"You're Not There"
6	Pleun Bierbooms	"What Hurts The Most"

Notes

1. Backstage performance

== Elimination Chart ==
=== Overall ===
Color key
Artist's info

- Artist from Team Waylon
- Artist from Team Sanne
- Artist from Team Ali B
- Artist from Team Guus

Result details

- Winner
- Runner-up
- Third place
- Fourth place

- Artist had the highest combined score of the week
- Artist was either saved by the public vote or by the total score
- Artist was eliminated

Live show results per week
Artist	Week 1	Week 2	Week 3	Week 4	Week 5		Finals
Artist	Week 1	Week 2	Week 3	Week 4	Round 1	Round 2	Finals
Pleun Bierbooms	Safe	Safe	Safe	Safe	Safe	Safe	Winner
Isabel Provoost	Safe	Safe	Safe	Safe	Safe	Safe	Runner-up
Vinchenzo Tahapary	Safe	Safe	Safe	Safe	Safe	Safe	3rd Place
Thijs Pot	Safe	Safe	Safe	Safe	Safe	Safe	4th Place
Dwight Dissels	Safe	Safe	Safe	Safe	Safe	Eliminated	
Leon Sherman	Safe	Safe	Safe	Safe	Eliminated		
Yerry Rellum	Safe	Safe	Safe	Eliminated			
Kirsten Berkx	Safe	Safe	Eliminated				
Romy Weevers	Safe	Eliminated					
Katell Chevalier	Safe	Eliminated					
Roza Lozica	Eliminated						
Sheela	Eliminated						

=== Team ===
Color key
Artist's info

- Artist from Team Waylon
- Artist from Team Sanne
- Artist from Team Ali B
- Artist from Team Guus

Result details

- Winner
- Runner-up
- Third place
- Fourth place
- Artist had the highest combined score of the week
- Artist was eliminated

Artist	Week 1	Week 2	Week 3	Week 4	Week 5	Finals
Pleun Bierbooms	Advanced	Advanced	Advanced	Advanced	Advanced	Winner
Yerry Rellum	Advanced	Advanced	Advanced	Eliminated		
Romy Weevers	Advanced	Eliminated				
Isabel Provoost	Advanced	Advanced	Advanced	Advanced	Advanced	Runner-up
Kirsten Berkx	Advanced	Advanced	Eliminated			
Sheela	Eliminated					
Vichenzo Tahapary	Advanced	Advanced	Advanced	Advanced	Advanced	3rd Place
Dwight Dissels	Advanced	Advanced	Advanced	Advanced	Eliminated	
Roza Lozica	Eliminated					
Thijs Pot	Advanced	Advanced	Advanced	Advanced	Advanced	4th Place
Leon Sherman	Advanced	Advanced	Advanced	Advanced	Eliminated	
Katell Chevalier	Advanced	Eliminated				

== Ratings ==
Episode	Airdate	Viewers
The Blind Auditions 1	21 October 2016	2.761.000
The Blind Auditions 2	28 October 2016	2.895.000
The Blind Auditions 3	4 November 2016	2.921.000
The Blind Auditions 4	11 November 2016	2.777.000
The Blind Auditions 5	18 November 2016	2.766.000
The Blind Auditions 6	25 November 2016	2.521.000
The Battles 1	2 December 2016	2.724.000
The Battles 2	9 December 2016	2.404.000
The Battles 3	16 December 2016	2.264.000
The Knockouts 1	23 December 2016	2.294.000
The Knockouts 2	6 January 2017	2.125.000
The Live Show 1	13 January 2017	2.231.000
The Live Show 2	20 January 2017	2.000.000
The Live Show 3	27 January 2017	2.179.000
The Live Show 4	3 February 2017	2.050.000
The Live Show 5	10 February 2017	2.148.000
The Finals	17 February 2017	2.531.000
