= Jennie Lena =

Dutch singer (born 1977)

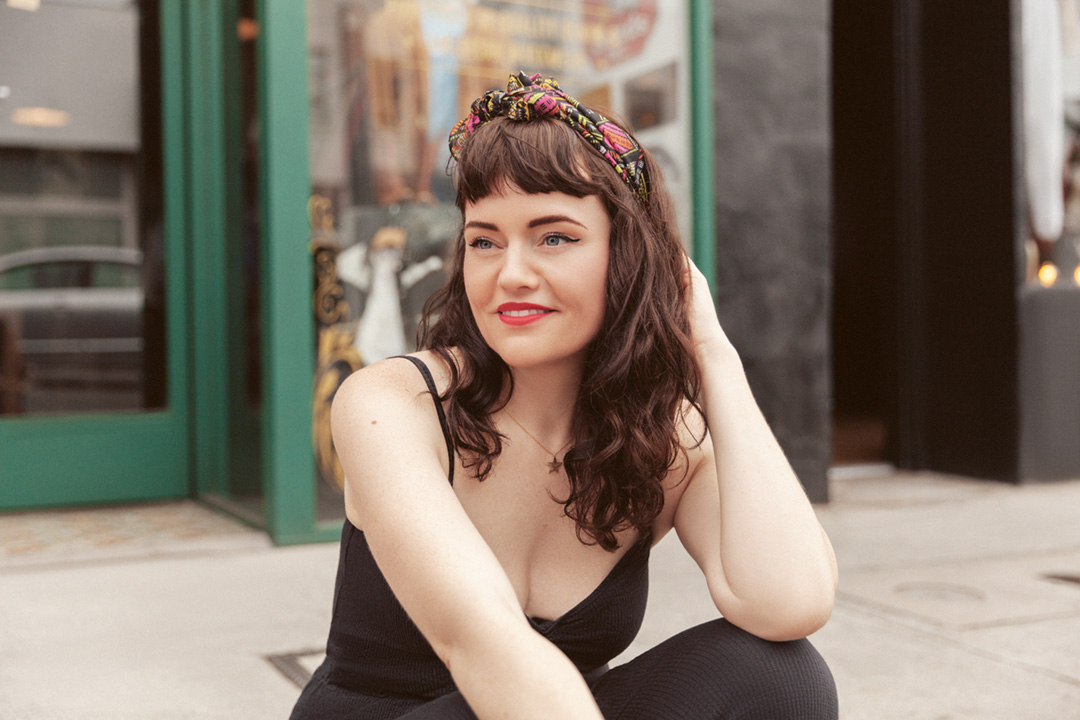
- Jennie Lena in 2018

Background information
- Born: Jennie Willemstijn; 1 December 1977 (age 48); Purmerend, Netherlands
- Genres: Soul, blues, pop, R&B
- Occupations: Singer, songwriter
- Instruments: Vocals, tambourine
- Years active: 2003–present
- Label: JuiceJunk Records
- Website: jennielena.com

Jennie Willemstijn (born 1 December 1977), known by her stage name of Jennie Lena, is a Dutch singer and songwriter.

== Early life ==
Lena was born in Purmerend, North Holland. She was a part of the Dutch Children's Theatre and won talent shows and competitions in her youth.

== Career ==
From the age of 5 until 15, Lena participated in various children's theatre productions, and as a child, she would often perform with her mother, who was also a singer and toured around the world. Often at the end of her mother's shows, Jennie would come out and sing 'Ben', accompanied by her mother on guitar.

In 2007, she won Talent Night, in Rotterdam. Also around this time, she performed in the United States at the Apollo Theater in Harlem, New York City, and performed several times in Asia. She was a singer for an Amsterdam-based band called Food for Funk between 2003 and 2007.

At the age of 25, Jennie studied Theatre Arts and afterwards decided to focus only on music. In 2009, she started performing backing vocals for Anouk, and it wasn't long before she began to write and record her own songs, making her way as an independent artist. In 2010, she released her self-written album 'Monsters', and in 2012, she released another album called 'Life's Like a Chox of Bogglets'.

She was noticed quickly, and things started to move at a whirlwind speed. Besides regular appearances on popular national TV & radio shows in the Netherlands, Jennie also opened for Joss Stone, who invited her on her international tour after watching her videos on the internet. After that tour, Jennie's own tour started, and she performed in many capitals in Europe, Asia and the US, amongst others at the legendary Apollo Theater in Harlem, New York City.

She had been writing songs for multiple musicians in the early and mid-2000s and chose a solo career in 2009. She released her first album Monsters in September 2009. By chance, Lena participated in the Groovalicious tour with Boris & Wicked Jazz Sounds, played at the Eurosonic Festival, and travelled in 2010 through The Netherlands with her own tour "Monsters on Tour". In 2013, Lena released her first album and singles with the record company T2 Entertainment.

On 6 June 2011, her new single Special Delivery came out, and on 30 September 2011, the new album Life's Like a Chox or Bogglets appeared, bringing Lena a more comprehensive musical direction. On 19 April 2012, she became the new singer of the band Sven Hammond Soul until June 2013.

In 2014, her acoustic version of Katy Perry's Firework was heard as a soundtrack in The Interview movie.

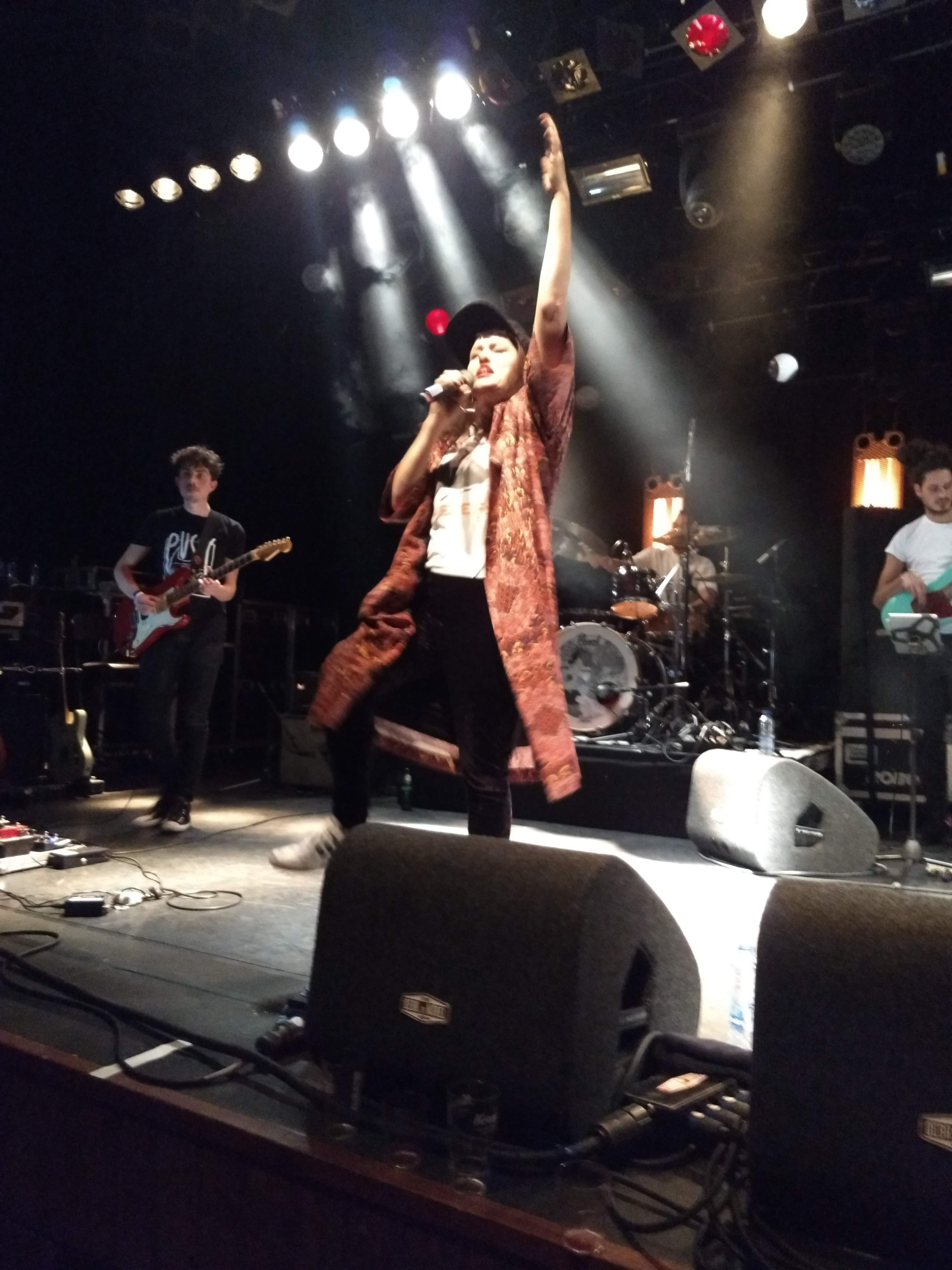
Lena performing in 2018

In 2016, the critically acclaimed Los Angeles-based retro band Postmodern Jukebox (60 million views on YouTube) invited Jennie to make a music video with them and go on tour with them. Jennie is the first European singer they have worked with. The song You Give Love a Bad Name debuted in the Top 10 of the American iTunes Charts Jazz and has millions of views. In May 2018, she recorded 2 more songs with them.

In 2017, Jennie released an acoustic EP, which entered the iTunes charts at number 1 in the Netherlands.

In April 2018, Jennie released another EP entitled 'Trouble'. The 1st single from this EP is 'Simple Love'.

Her solo album 'To Be Honest' was released on 12 October 2018.

=== The Voice of Holland ===
In 2015, Lena appeared on The Voice of Holland in Season 6. Her audition, in which she sang "Who's Loving You" by The Jackson Five, accumulated over 100 million views on multiple internet platforms. Her performance was seen by many as the best audition in The Voice franchise history. Music blogger Perez Hilton wrote on his blog: "It wasn't only the best audition for 'The Voice', it was one of the BEST auditions I've EVER seen for a singing competition. Jennie is 1 of my favourite vocalists ever!" Lena made it to the finals, where she came in fourth place.

International blogs like 9Gag, Diply, The Huffington Post and LikeMag started blogging about Jennie and stars like Robin Thicke, Kelly Clarkson, Adam Levine, Tyler Perry and Nia Long also shared Jennie's music videos on their social media.

After 'The Voice', Jennie went to L.A. & New York to perform and started writing for her new album, and the international South by SouthWest Festival (SXSW) in Austin, Texas, invited her to perform.

== Discography ==
- 2009: Monsters (EP) (Streaming only)
- 2011: Life's Like A Chox of Bogglets (EP) (Streaming only)
- 2011: Acoustic Sessions (EP) (Streaming only)
- 2018: To Be Honest
- 2019: Live, Raw and Intimate (Live EP)
- 2020: Analog Girl in a Digital World

== Personal life ==
Lena is fluent in Dutch and English. In 2013, Lena gave birth to a daughter. She is divorced as of 2015.
