= Pleun Bierbooms =

Dutch singer

Pleun Bierbooms / Plume
- Born: 3 October 1998 (age 27); Lieshout, Netherlands
- Genres: Pop, Pop rock
- Occupation: Singer
- Instrument: Vocals
- Years active: 2015–present
- Labels: 8ball Music
- Website: https://pleunbierbooms.nl/

Pleun Bierbooms (born October 3, 1998) is a Dutch singer who won the 7th season of the Voice of Holland.

== Life and career ==
Bierbooms was born on 3 October 1998 in Lieshout, North Brabant, the Netherlands.

In 2012, Bierbooms won The Voice of Nuenen. She became the winner of The Voice of Holland 2017 on 17 February 2017. Her coach was Waylon. In 2017, Bierbooms was a guest artist during the concerts of the Toppers in the Amsterdam ArenA.

== Discography ==
=== Singles ===
- "What's Hurt the Most"
- "One Last Time"
- "The Voice Within"
- "Rise"
- "The Edge of Glory"
- "What Now"
- "Writings on the Wall"
- "I Miss You"
- “Love is pain” (nov 3rd 2023)

https://open.spotify.com/track/6Prd1Z03iwPmmPSPTzMBhh?si=E1rAYjEKTa6-3tsI9dL6MA

Awards and achievements
Preceded by Maan de Steenwinkel	Winner of The Voice of Holland; Season seven (2016–2017)	Succeeded by Jim van der Zee
