= Nielson (singer) =

Dutch singer-songwriter (born 1989)

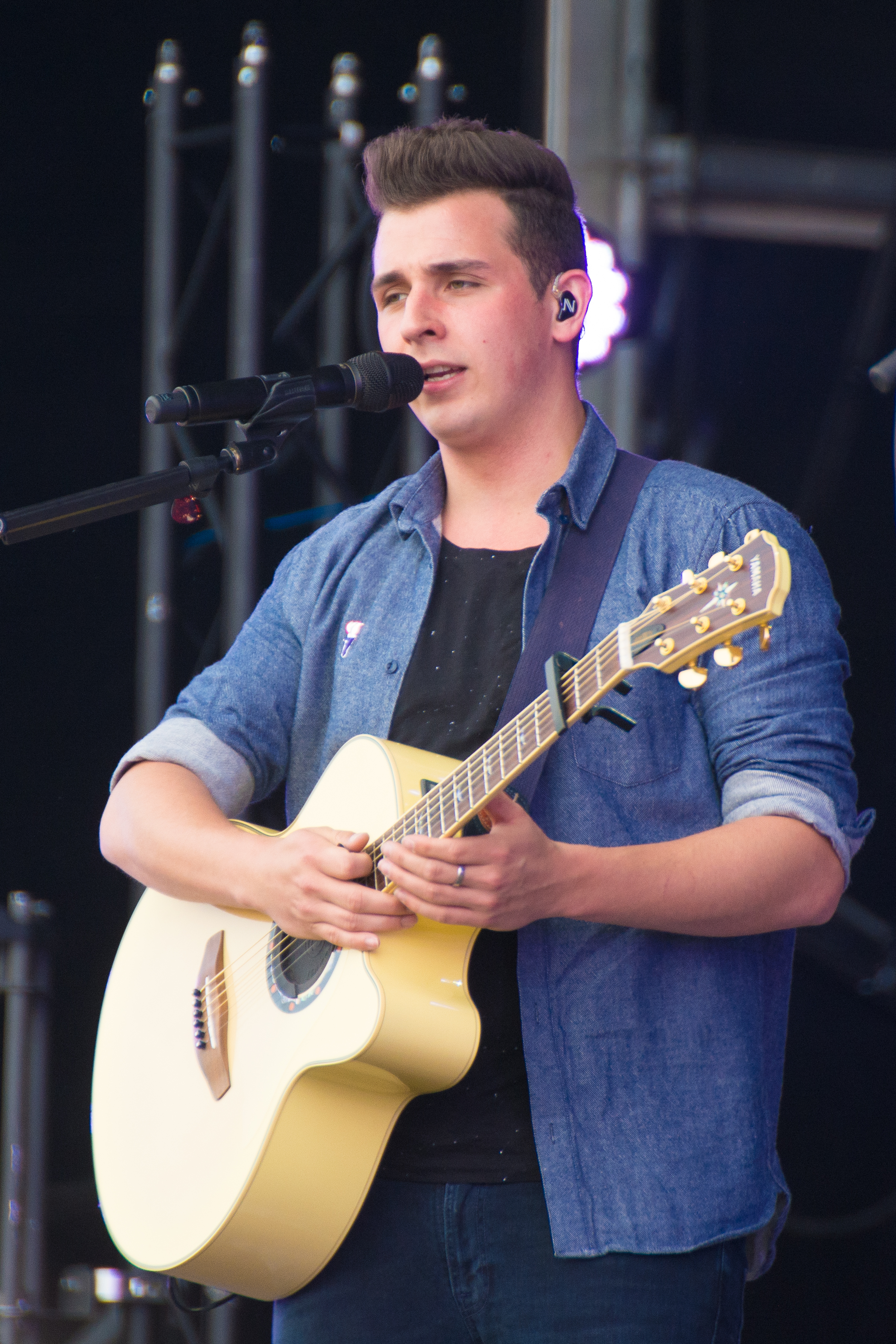
- Nielson performing in Zwolle in 2014

Background information
- Also known as: Nielson
- Born: Niels Littooij; 28 December 1989 (age 36); Dordrecht, Netherlands
- Genre: Nederpop
- Occupation: Singer-songwriter
- Instruments: Vocals, guitar
- Years active: 2008–present
- Label: Pacemaker Music
- Website: nielsonmusic.nl

Niels Littooij (born 28 December 1989), better known by his stage name Nielson, is a Dutch singer-songwriter. He was a member of the Dutch music trio Zirkus Zirkus in the early 2010s, but rose to national fame in 2012 due to his participation in the television programme De beste singer-songwriter van Nederland.

== Career ==
=== 1989–2008: Early life and career beginnings ===
Niels Littooij was born on 28 December 1989 in Dordrecht. His passion for music started when he got a drum kit for his birthday. He also started to play the guitar. As an adolescent, Littooij began to explore his interest for music and participated in several local talent shows. Littooij attended the Herman Brood Academy in Utrecht, an academy that offers education in various fields of profession related to the music industry, where he specialised in rap music. In 2008, Littooij participated in the Kunstbende project, where he won the Rotterdam preliminaries with a rap act. Due to this success, Littooij was asked to perform in the supporting programme of The Opposites.

=== 2009–2011: Part of Zirkus Zirkus ===
In 2009, Nickelodeon asked Littooij to be part of a new-formed dance and music trio called Zirkus Zirkus. With Zirkus Zirkus, he released several singles and one studio album called In de tent. The trio was aimed at children and they appeared on TV in several Nickelodeon programmes. The trio had some moderate success: three singles charted on the Single Top 100. In 2011, they split up.

=== 2012–2013: Rise to fame ===
During his education at the Herman Brood Academy, Littooij developed a passion for songwriting, especially for writing Dutch songs. Littooij participated in the 2012 talent show De beste singer-songwriter van Nederland (English: "The best singer-songwriter of the Netherlands"), broadcast by VARA, BNN and 3FM. This was a great opportunity to reach a broader, national, audience for his self-written songs. In the first episode, Littooij performed his song "Beauty & de brains", which became an instant hit. Although Littooij lost the competition in favor of Douwe Bob, he had achieved national fame and popularity.

=== 2013–present: Zo van ah yeah and Met de tijd mee ===
His song "Beauty & de brains" was released as single and was certified Platinum by the NVPI. Littooij started working on his first studio album, Zo van ah yeah. It was released in March 2014 through Pacemaker Music. Several singles preceded the album, including "Hoe", a Platinum-certified collaboration with Miss Montreal and "Mannenharten", a collaboration with BLØF (the title song of the movie of the same name). The album reached the second position on the Album Top 100.

With the 2014 single "Sexy als ik dans", Littooij achieved his first success in Belgium. It reached the peak position in the Ultratop 50 and was certified Platinum by the Belgian Entertainment Association. The single also performed well in his own country, where it became his third Platinum-certified single. When King Willem-Alexander visited Littooij's home city of Dordrecht on Koningsdag 2015, Littooij was chosen to end the festivities with a performance of "Sexy als ik dans".

In 2015, Littooij released two extended plays called Met de tijd mee, deel 1 en Met de tijd mee, deel 2. Included on the EPs is the single "Sexy als ik dans", among others.

== Discography ==
Nielson discography
- Studio albums: 1
- Extended plays: 2
- Singles: 10

=== Albums ===
==== Studio albums ====
| Title | Album details | Peak chart positions | |
| Title | Album details | NL | BEL (FLA) |
|---|---|---|---|
| Zo van ah yeah | Released: 7 March 2014; Label: Pacemaker Music | 2 | 152 |
| Weet je wat het is | Released: 11 March 2016; Label: Pacemaker Music | 3 | 182 |
| Diamant | Released: 12 October 2018; Label: Pacemaker Music | 10 | 52 |
| Niels | Released: 15 September 2023; Label: Pacemaker Music | 27 | — |

==== Extended plays ====
| Title | Album details | Peak chart positions |
| Title | Album details | NL |
|---|---|---|
| Met de tijd mee, deel 1 | Released: 30 March 2015; Label: Pacemaker Music | — (Note: Met de tijd mee, deel 1 did chart on the Dutch Mid price Top 50 albums chart, where it reached the 15th position.) |
| Met de tijd mee, deel 2 | Released: 25 October 2015; Label: Pacemaker Music | — (Note: Met de tijd mee, deel 2 did chart on the Dutch Mid price Top 50 albums chart, where it reached the sixth position.) |
"—" denotes items which were not released in that country or failed to chart.

=== Singles ===
==== As lead artist ====
| Title | Year | Peak chart positions | | | Certifications | Album |
| Title | Year | NL Top 40 | NL Top 100 | BEL (FLA) | Certifications | Album |
|---|---|---|---|---|---|---|
| "Beauty & de brains" | 2012 | 7 | 3 | — | NVPI: Platinum | Zo van ah yeah |
| "Zo kan het dus ook" | 2013 | 36 | 37 | — | | Non-album single |
| "Hoe" (with Miss Montreal) | 2013 | 4 | 5 | 53 | NVPI: Platinum | Zo van ah yeah |
| "Mannenharten" (with BLØF) | 2013 | 10 | 11 | — | | Zo van ah yeah |
| "Kop in het zand" | 2014 | 36 | 70 | — | | Zo van ah yeah |
| "Sexy als ik dans" | 2014 | 12 | 6 | 1 | BEA: Platinum; NVPI: Platinum | Met de tijd mee, deel 1 |
| "De man die niet kan gaan" | 2014 | — | 90 | 23 | | Non-album single |
| "De kleine dingen" | 2014 | 46 | — | — | | Met de tijd mee, deel 1 |
| "Ik heb een meisje thuis" | 2015 | 44 | 99 | 52 | | Met de tijd mee, deel 1 |
| "Laat je gaan" | 2015 | 60 | — | — | | Met de tijd mee, deel 2 |
| "Hotelsuite" (featuring Jiggy Djé) | 2016 | 36 | 77 | — | | Weet je wat het is |
| "Hoogste Versnelling" (featuring Jiggy Djé) | 2016 | 46 | — | — | | Weet je wat het is |
| "Diamant" | 2018 | 29 | 59 | 35 | | Diamant |
| "Doen, Durven of de Waarheid" | 2018 | — | — | 57 | | Diamant |
| "IJskoud" | 2018 | 2 | 5 | 12 | | Diamant |
| "Ik Sta Jou Beter" (with Kris Kross Amsterdam) | 2019 | 16 | 28 | 62 | | Non-album singles |
| "Kerstcadeau" | 2022 | 24 | 50 | — | | Non-album singles |
| "Joost" | 2024 | — | — | — | | Non-album singles |
"—" denotes items which were not released in that country or failed to chart.

==== Other appearances ====
| Title | Year | Peak chart positions | | |
| Title | Year | NL Top 40 | NL Top 100 | BEL (FLA) |
|---|---|---|---|---|
| "Koningslied" (song by various Dutch artists for the investiture of Willem-Alexander) | 2013 | 2 | 1 | 41 |
