= Diply =

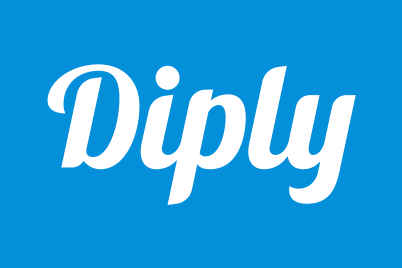

- Screenshot
- Owner: GoViral Inc.
- Creators: Taylor Ablitt, Dean Elkholy, Gary Manning
- Website: diply.com
- Commercial: Yes
- Launched: 2013; 13 years ago

Diply was a social news website published by the parent company GoViral which was based in London, Ontario, New York City and Toronto. It once ranked among the top-100 most popular websites in the world and the top-20 websites in Canada. In April 2019, it was among the top 5000 most popular websites in Canada, and top 22000 in the world.

== History ==
Diply was founded in 2013 by Taylor Ablitt (CEO), Dean Elkholy, and Gary Manning.

In September 2016, Diply hired Kirstine Stewart as chief strategy officer. She left the company in late 2017. By 2016, Diply was also the fourteenth top website in Canada and 70th globally. The site averaged more than 20 million views per day by 2017.

In August 2018, Diply laid off 40 employees at its London, Toronto and New York offices.

In October 2018, another 35 employees were laid off.

As of 2021, Diply's Toronto office was shuttered.
