= Ilse DeLange discography =

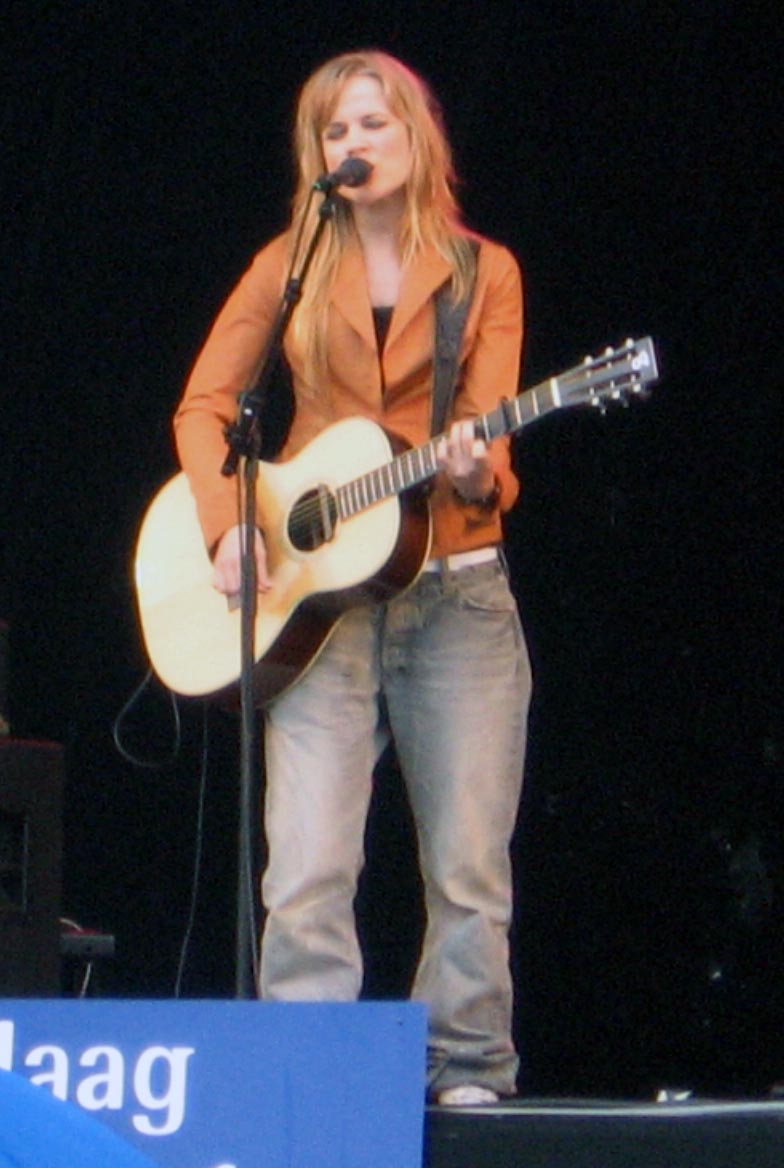

This is the discography of Dutch country pop singer Ilse DeLange.

== Albums ==
=== Studio albums ===
| Title | Details | Peak chart positions | | Certifications |
| Title | Details | NL | BEL | Certifications |
|---|---|---|---|---|
| World of Hurt | Released: 1998; Label: Warner Bros. Records; Format: Digital download, CD | 1 | 17 | NVPI: 5× Platinum |
| Livin' on Love | Released: 2000; Label: Warner Elektra Atlantic; Format: Digital download, CD | 5 | 36 | NVPI: Platinum |
| Clean Up | Released: 1 April 2003; Label: Warner Music; Format: Digital download, CD | 1 | 31 | NVPI: Gold |
| The Great Escape | Released: 15 June 2006; Label: Universal Music; Format: Digital download, CD | 1 | 59 | NVPI: 2× Platinum |
| Incredible | Released: 17 October 2008; Label: Universal Music; Format: Digital download, CD | 1 | 35 | NVPI: 5× Platinum |
| Next to Me | Released: 27 August 2010; Label: Firefly Music; Format: Digital download, CD | 1 | 46 | NVPI: 2× Platinum |
| Eye of the Hurricane | Released: 12 September 2012; Label: Firefly Music; Format: Digital download, CD | 1 | 101 | NVPI: Platinum |
| Ilse DeLange | Released: 31 August 2018; Label: Firefly Music; Format: Digital download, CD | 3 | 39 | NVPI: Gold |
| Gravel & Dust | Released: 6 September 2019; Label: Spark; Format: Digital download, CD | 2 | 20 | |
| Changes | Released: 15 May 2020; Label: Spark; Format: Digital download, CD | 4 | 97 | |
| Tainted | Released: 3 May 2024; Label: Spark; Format: Digital download, CD | 3 | 97 | |
"—" denotes a recording that did not chart or was not released in that territory.

=== Live albums ===
| Title | Details | Peak chart positions | | Certifications |
| Title | Details | NL | BEL | Certifications |
|---|---|---|---|---|
| Dear John | Released: 1 October 1999; Label: Warner Bros. Records; Format: Digital download, CD | 3 | 20 | NVPI: Platinum |
| Live | Released: 2007; Label: Universal Music; Format: Digital download, CD | 4 | — | NVPI: Gold |
| Live in Ahoy | Released: 21 August 2009; Label: Universal Music; Format: Digital download, CD | 1 | — | |
| Live in Gelredome | Released: 3 June 2011; Label: Firefly Music; Format: Digital download, CD | 1 | — | |
| Live in Gelredome, the second | Released: 12 February 2013; Label: Universal Music; Format: Digital download, CD | — | — | |
"—" denotes a recording that did not chart or was not released in that territory.

=== Compilation albums ===
| Title | Details | Peak chart positions | | Certifications |
| Title | Details | NL | BEL | Certifications |
|---|---|---|---|---|
| Here I Am | Released: 31 October 2003; Label: WEA; Format: Digital download, CD | 5 | — | NVPI: Gold |
| After the Hurricane – Greatest Hits & More | Released: 25 October 2013; Label: Firefly Music; Format: Digital download, CD | 2 | 101 | NVPI: Platinum |
| The Singles Collection 1998–2023 | Released: 8 September 2023; Label: Universal, Spark; Format: Digital download, CD | 5 | 159 | |
"—" denotes a recording that did not chart or was not released in that territory.

== Singles ==
| Year | Title | Peak chart positions | | Album |
| Year | Title | NL Top 40 | NL Top 100 | Album |
|---|---|---|---|---|
| 1998 | "I'm Not So Tough" | 35 | 35 | World of Hurt |
| 1998 | "World of Hurt" | — | 58 | World of Hurt |
| 1998 | "I'd Be Yours" | — | 52 | World of Hurt |
| 1999 | "When We Don't Talk" | — | 76 | World of Hurt |
| 2000 | "Livin' on Love" | 37 | 44 | Livin' on Love |
| 2001 | "I Still Cry" | — | 70 | Livin' on Love |
| 2002 | "Shine" (with Rosemary's Sons) | 34 | 33 | |
| 2003 | "No Reason To Be Shy" | — | 61 | Clean Up |
| 2003 | "Before You Let Me Go" (with Kane) | 4 | 3 | |
| 2003 | "Wouldn't That Be Something" | — | 87 | Here I Am |
| 2004 | "All The Answers" | — | 65 | Here I Am |
| 2005 | "Blue" (with Zucchero) | 23 | 10 | Zu&Co (Dutch Edition) |
| 2006 | "The Great Escape" | 11 | 11 | The Great Escape |
| 2006 | "The Lonely One" | 18 | 12 | The Great Escape |
| 2007 | "I Love You" | 26 | 35 | The Great Escape |
| 2007 | "Reach for the Light" | — | — | The Great Escape |
| 2008 | "So Incredible" | 6 | 1 | Incredible |
| 2009 | "Miracle" | 1 | 2 | Incredible |
| 2009 | "Puzzle Me" | 5 | 9 | Incredible |
| 2009 | "We're Alright" | 21 | — | Incredible |
| 2010 | "Next to Me" | 9 | 4 | Next to Me |
| 2010 | "High Places" (with Kane) | 13 | 12 | Next to Me |
| 2010 | "Beautiful Distraction" | 18 | 43 | Next to Me |
| 2011 | "Carousel" | 32 | — | Next to Me |
| 2011 | "DoLuv2LuvU" | 14 | 7 | Non-album single |
| 2012 | "Without You (Acoustic)" | — | 92 | Eye of the Hurricane |
| 2012 | "Hurricane" | 23 | 7 | Eye of the Hurricane |
| 2012 | "Winter of Love" | 20 | 13 | Eye of the Hurricane |
| 2013 | "We Are One" | 33 | 32 | Eye of the Hurricane |
| 2013 | "Blue Bittersweet" | 8 | 16 | After The Hurricane – Greatest Hits & More |
| 2018 | "OK" | 28 | — | Ilse DeLange |
| 2018 | "Lay Your Weapons Down" | — | — | Ilse DeLange |
| 2019 | "Gravel & Dust" | — | — | Gravel & Dust |
| 2020 | "Changes" | 16 | 63 | Changes |
| 2020 | "Wrong Direction" (with Michael Schulte) | — | — | Changes |
| 2020 | "I'll Hold On" | — | — | Non-album singles |
| 2021 | "I Will Help You" | — | — | Non-album singles |
| 2023 | "Before the Storm" (with Bertolf) | — | — | Non-album singles |
"—" denotes a recording that did not chart or was not released in that territory.

== Music videos ==
| Year | Title |
|---|---|
| 1998 | "I'm Not So Tough" |
| 2008 | "So Incredible" |
| 2009 | "Miracle" |
| 2009 | "Puzzle Me" |
| 2010 | "Next To Me" |
| 2010 | "Beautiful Distraction" |
| 2012 | "Hurricane" |
| 2013 | "We Are One" |
| 2013 | "Blue Bittersweet" |
| 2018 | "OK" |
| 2018 | "Lay Your Weapons Down" |
| 2020 | "Changes" |
| 2021 | "I Will Help You" |
