= Dennis Crouch (bassist) =

American bassist

Dennis Crouch (born January 19, 1967) is an American double bassist raised in Strawberry, Arkansas, United States.

He came from a musical family and started playing bass when he was eight years old. In 1996 he moved to Nashville, Tennessee. Two years later, he co-founded the Time Jumpers, a western swing band. He left the band in 2012. He has recorded and performed with Gregg Allman, T Bone Burnett, Johnny Cash, Elvis Costello, Harry Connick Jr., Elton John, Diana Krall, Alison Krauss, Imelda May, Willie Nelson, Robert Plant, Steven Tyler, John Mellencamp, Ralph Stanley, Paula Cole, Loretta Lynn, Vince Gill, The Chieftains, and Steve Earle.

He played on the 2003 album Wildwood Flower, which won a Grammy Award for Best Traditional Folk Album.

Crouch played bass on the mid-2021 Bob Dylan recordings of "Blowin' in the Wind," "Masters of War," "The Times They Are A-Changin'," "Simple Twist of Fate," "Gotta Serve Somebody," and "Not Dark Yet", produced by T-Bone Burnett and recorded and mixed by Michael Piersante, for a one-time sale as Ionic Originals.

== Collaborations ==
- His Friends - Candi Staton (2006)
- Life, Death, Love and Freedom - John Mellencamp (2008)
- The Blue Ridge Rangers Rides Again - John Fogerty (2009)
- The Union - Elton John, Leon Russell (2010)
- Low Country Blues - Gregg Allman (2011)
- Guitar Slinger - Vince Gill (2011)
- Storm & Grace - Lisa Marie Presley (2012)
- Old Yellow Moon - Emmylou Harris, Rodney Crowell (2013)
- Like a Rose - Ashley Monroe (2013)
- Wallflower - Diana Krall (2015)
- Gravel & Dust - Ilse DeLange (2019)
- Texas - Rodney Crowell (2019)
- Amidst the Chaos - Sara Bareilles (2019)
- Mississippi Suitcase - Peter Parcek (2020)
- "Blowin' in the Wind," "Masters of War," "The Times They Are A-Changin'," "Simple Twist of Fate," "Gotta Serve Somebody," and "Not Dark Yet" - Bob Dylan (2021)
- Daddy's Country Gold - Melissa Carper (2021)
- Look Up - Ringo Starr (2025)
