= List of number-one albums of 2010 (Netherlands) =

13 albums were number one on the Mega Album Top 100, the official albums record chart of the Netherlands, in 2010. The first album to top the chart that year was Susan Boyle's I Dreamed a Dream, and the last was Dromen durven delen by Marco Borsato. Artists and bands who had an album reach number one on the chart for at least one week were Boyle, K3, Jurk!, Caro Emerald, Jan Smit, Alain Clark, Ilse DeLange, Phil Collins, Nick & Simon, Jamiroquai, Bursato and Michael Jackson. Out of all of them, Jurk!, Emerald and Jamiroquai had their first ever number-one album on the chart. Emerald's Deleted Scenes from the Cutting Room Floor was the best-performing of 2010, topped the 2010 year-end chart.

== Chart history ==
Key
†	Indicates best-selling album of 2010

Issue date(s)	Album	Artist(s)
2–9 January	I Dreamed a Dream	Susan Boyle
16 January	MaMaSé!	K3
23 January	Avondjurk	Jurk!
30 January	MaMaSé!	K3
6 February–27 March	Deleted Scenes from the Cutting Room Floor †	Caro Emerald
3 April	Leef	Jan Smit
10 April–29 May	Deleted Scenes from the Cutting Room Floor †	Caro Emerald
5 June	Colorblind	Alain Clark
12 June–28 August	Deleted Scenes from the Cutting Room Floor †	Caro Emerald
4–11 September	Next to Me	Ilse DeLange
18 September–2 October	Going Back	Phil Collins
9–30 October	Fier	Nick & Simon
6 November	Rock Dust Light Star	Jamiroquai
13 November	The Gift	Susan Boyle
20 November	Deleted Scenes from the Cutting Room Floor †	Caro Emerald
27 November–11 December	Dromen durven delen	Marco Borsato
18 December	Michael	Michael Jackson
25 December	Dromen durven delen	Marco Borsato

== See also ==
- 2010 in music
