= Next to Me =

Next to Me may refer to:

== Music ==
=== Albums ===
- Next to Me (album), a 2010 album by Ilse DeLange

=== Songs ===
- "Next to Me" (Emeli Sandé song), 2012
- "Next to Me" (Imagine Dragons song), 2018
- "Next to Me" (Otto Knows song), 2015
- "Next to Me" (Rüfüs Du Sol song), 2021
- "Next to Me", a song by Jordan Feliz
- "Next to Me", a song by Clyde McPhatter
- "Next to Me", a song by Stealers Wheel from Stealers Wheel, B-side of "Everyone's Agreed That Everything Will Turn Out Fine"
- "Next to Me", a song by Samantha Fox from I Wanna Have Some Fun
- "Next to Me", a song by Nadine Renee from Nadine
- "Next to Me", a song by Truth Hurts from Truthfully Speaking
- "Next to Me", a song by Shayne Ward from Shayne Ward
- "Next to Me", a song by Civil Twilight from Civil Twilight
- "Next to Me", a song by Roy Harper from Death or Glory?
- "Next to Me", a song by CeCe Peniston
- "Next to Me", a song by Ilse DeLange from Next to Me
- "Next to Me", a song by Gavin DeGraw from Gavin DeGraw
- "Next to Me", a song by Cute Is What We Aim For
- "Next to Me", a song by Zug Izland
- "Next to Me", a song by Steve Grand from All American Boy
- "Next 2 Me", a song by Reks from Grey Hairs

== Other ==
- Next to Me (film), a 2015 Serbian film

== See also ==
- "Next to You, Next to Me", a 1990 single by Shenandoah
