= The Voice of Holland season 5 =

The Voice of Holland
- Season 5
- Hosted by: Martijn Krabbé; Wendy van Dijk; Jamai Loman (Red room)
- Coaches: Marco Borsato; Trijntje Oosterhuis; Ilse DeLange; Ali B
- Winner: O'G3NE
- Winning coach: Marco Borsato
- Runner-up: Sjors van der Panne

Release
- Original network: RTL 4
- Original release: 29 August – 19 December 2014

Season chronology
- ← Previous; Season 4 Next → Season 6

The fifth season of the Dutch reality singing competition The Voice of Holland, created by media tycoon John de Mol Jr., aired during 2014 on RTL 4. Martijn Krabbé and Wendy van Dijk returned as co-hosts, while Jamai Loman replaced Winston Gerschtanowitz as host of the red room. Marco Borsato, Trijntje Oosterhuis, Ilse DeLange and Ali B returned as coaches.

One of the important premises of the show is the quality of the singing talent. Four coaches, themselves popular performing artists, train the talents in their group and occasionally perform with them. Talents are selected in blind auditions, where the coaches cannot see, but only hear the auditioner.

This season included future Eurovision winner Duncan Laurence, who competed under his real name, Duncan de Moor.

== Coaches ==
For the first time in this show's history, all 4 coaches from Season 4 (Trijnte Oostherhuis, Marco Borsato, Ali B, and Ilse de Lange) have returned for season 5.

== Teams ==
Color key

– Winner
– Runner-up
– Third Place
– Fourth Place
– Fifth place
– Eliminated in Cross-Battles (Semi-Finals)

– Eliminated in Live Show 4
– Eliminated in Live Show 3
– Eliminated in the Clash rounds (Live Shows 1 & 2)
– Artist was stolen by another coach
– Eliminated in the Battle rounds

Coaches	Top 58 artists			
Ilse de Lange				
Ilse de Lange	Duncan de Moor	Megan Brands	Sietske Oosterhuis	Kelly Cossee
Ilse de Lange	Angela Vergouwen	Frank van Oudhuizen	Pip Alblas	Kimberley Janice
Ilse de Lange	~~Rob de Nijs~~	~~Pim Kouwenhoven~~	Lewi-Sara Siahaya	Yorlenie
Ilse de Lange	Irma Derby	Vivian Tarmidi	Roos van der Hoeven	Eva Treurniet
Ali B				
Ali B	Guus Mulder	April & Dr. Rum	Ferry de Ruiter	Renee de Ruijter
Ali B	Gabriella Massa	Ruben Tarmidi	Martha Hertogs	Vincent Vilouca
Ali B	Julia Duiker	Eva Franken	Anita Makkinje	Erik Linderman
Ali B	Alejandro Veenaas	Dr. Rum	Sotiri Antonakoudis	Whitney Eblé
Marco Borsato				
Marco Borsato	O'G3NE	Sjors van der Panne	MELL	Rob de Nijs
Marco Borsato	Graziëlla Hunsel	Abigail Martina	~~Bella~~	~~Dynah Dettingmeijer~~
Marco Borsato	~~Gabriella Massa~~	~~Anne Postma~~	Mirjam van der Loo	Danique van der Vlugt
Marco Borsato	Lucette Snellenburg	Britt Lenting	Sabine Uitslag	
Trijntje Oosterhuis				
Trijntje Oosterhuis	Emmaly Brown	David Dam	Romy Monteiro	Dennis Kroon
Trijntje Oosterhuis	Pim Kouwenhoven	Sherefa Yorks	Eloy Smit	Daisy van Lingen
Trijntje Oosterhuis	~~Kelly Cossee~~	Jaël Been	Clifton End	Eddie Conard
Trijntje Oosterhuis	Jackie Teerenstra	Remko Harms	Robin Kappetein	
Stolen contestants are italicized.

== Blind auditions ==
A contestant pool of 150 was narrowed down to 58 artists during the blind audition. The first blind audition episode premiered on August 29, 2014 while the last blind audition episode showed on October 10, 2014. New this year, if an artist does not turn a chair, they must immediately exit the stage.

Color key

✔	Coach hit his/her "I WANT YOU" button
	Artist defaulted to this coach's team
	Artist elected to join this coach's team
	Artist eliminated with no coach pressing his or her "I WANT YOU" button

=== Episode 1 (August 29) ===
Order	Artist	Age	Song	Coach's and contestant's choices			
Order	Artist	Age	Song	Ilse	Ali B	Marco	Trijntje
1	MELL	20	"Piece of My Heart"	✔	✔	✔	✔
2	Bibi Breijman	22	"Sacrifice"	—	—	—	—
3	Emmaly Brown	19	"Titanium"	✔	✔	✔	✔
4	Pim Kouwenhoven	17	"Rocketeer"	✔	✔	✔	—
5	Megan Brands	27	"How Come You Don't Call Me"	✔	✔	✔	✔
6	Dr. Rum	23	"Can't Hold Us"	—	✔	—	✔
7	Jacqueline Tolken	28	"Hij"	—	—	—	—
8	Jitschaka van Leeuwen	22	"I Wish I Didn't Miss You"	—	—	—	—
9	Eloy Smit	19	"I Heard It Through the Grapevine"	✔	✔	—	✔
10	Renee de Ruijter	19	"When a Man Loves a Woman"	✔	✔	✔	✔
11	Lizzy Dekker	18	"Multicoloured Angels"	—	—	—	—
12	David Dam	24	"Let's Get It On"	✔	✔	✔	✔

=== Episode 2 (September 5) ===
Order	Artist	Age	Song	Coach's and contestant's choices			
Order	Artist	Age	Song	Ilse	Ali B	Marco	Trijntje
1	Sherefa Yorks	17	"Believer"	✔	✔	✔	✔
2	Charissa van der Veldt	35	"My Life Would Suck Without You"	—	—	—	—
3	Sjors van der Panne	35	"Zeg Me Dat Het Niet Zo Is"	✔	✔	✔	✔
4	Sem Rooijakkers	17	"Somewhere Only We Know"	—	—	—	—
5	Romy Monteiro	21	"I Will Always Love You"	✔	✔	✔	✔
6	Jelle Broersma	28	"Thrift Shop" / "I Love Rock n' Roll" / "We Will Rock You" / "Soldaat"	—	—	—	—
7	Maxime and Renée van Loenhout	16 / 21	"Jolene"	—	—	—	—
8	Eva Treurniet	21	"Clarity"	✔	✔	✔	✔
9	Sabine Uitslag	41	"Good God"	—	✔	✔	✔
10	Guillaume van de Leuv	20	"The A Team"	—	—	—	—
11	Alejandro Veenaas	34	"Gorilla"	—	✔	✔	—
12	Eddie Conard	58	"What's Going On"	✔	✔	✔	✔
13	Martha Hertogs	22	"You'll Never Walk Alone"	✔	✔	✔	✔

=== Episode 3 (September 12) ===
Order	Artist	Age	Song	Coach's and contestant's choices			
Order	Artist	Age	Song	Ilse	Ali B	Marco	Trijntje
1	Pip Alblas	18	"Hurricane"	✔	—	✔	✔
2	Abigail Martina	24	"The Greatest Love of All"	✔	—	✔	✔
3	Marita Fontana	44	"Can't Remember to Forget You"	—	—	—	—
4	Guus Mulder	19	"I Wanna Dance with Somebody (Who Loves Me)"	—	✔	—	✔
5	Danique van der Vlugt	17	"Ordinary Love"	—	✔	✔	✔
6	Dennis Kroon	35	"Hello"	✔	✔	✔	✔
7	Murvien la Croes	20	"I Believe I Can Fly"	—	—	—	—
8	Mirjam van der Loo	35	"Liefde van Later"	✔	—	✔	✔
9	Jean-Pierre Schrijver	38	"Careless Whisper"	—	—	—	—
10	Rob de Nijs	24	"Stay with Me"	✔	✔	✔	✔
11	Julia Tuitel	17	"Michel"	—	—	—	—
12	O'G3NE (Lisa, Amy, & Shelley Vol)	20 / 18 / 18	"Emotion"	✔	✔	✔	✔

=== Episode 4 (September 19) ===
Order	Artist	Age	Song	Coach's and contestant's choices			
Order	Artist	Age	Song	Ilse	Ali B	Marco	Trijntje
1	Dominique van der Meulen	24	"Hometown Glory"	—	—	—	—
2	Bella	22	"Addicted to You"	—	✔	✔	—
3	Vincent Vilouca	41	"Say Something"	—	✔	✔	✔
4	Sietske Oosterhuis	20	"Rather Be"	✔	✔	✔	✔
5	Jaël Been	24	"Purple Rain"	—	✔	—	✔
6	April	27	"J'me tire"	✔	✔	—	—
7	Erik Lindeman	27	"Electric"	✔	✔	✔	✔
8	Nikky Lijffman	28	"Treasure"	—	—	—	—
9	Kimberley Janice	19	"I Can't Make You Love Me"	✔	✔	—	✔
10	Lucette Snellenburg	48	"I Can't Stand The Rain"	✔	✔	✔	✔
11	Joost Baars	30	"Sweeter"	—	—	—	—
12	Ferry de Ruiter	22	"At Last"	✔	✔	✔	✔

=== Episode 5 (September 26) ===
Order	Artist	Age	Song	Coach's and contestant's choices			
Order	Artist	Age	Song	Ilse	Ali B	Marco	Trijntje
1	Dynah Dettingmeijer	19	"Kiss"	✔	✔	✔	✔
2	Nikki Wennekes	23	"Burn"	—	—	—	—
3	Robin Kappetein	22	"Rumour Has It"	—	✔	—	✔
4	Remko Harms	32	"All by Myself"	✔	✔	✔	✔
5	Romana Bruintjes	20	"Next to Me"	—	—	—	—
6	Julia Duiker	18	"Like a Star"	—	✔	✔	—
7	Anne Postma	31	"E.T."	—	—	✔	—
8	Laurens Hagens	24	"Treasure"	—	—	—	—
9	Roos van der Hoeven	22	"Russian Roulette"	✔	✔	✔	—
10	Ruben Tarmidi	19	"Wicked Way"	—	✔	✔	✔
11	Vivian Tarmidi	20	"Circus"	✔	—	—	—
12	Yorlenie	24	"Doo Wop (That Thing)"	✔	✔	—	✔

=== Episode 6 (October 3) ===
Order	Artist	Age	Song	Coach's and contestant's choices			
Order	Artist	Age	Song	Ilse	Ali B	Marco	Trijntje
1	Charlotte Hogeslag	29	"This Is What It Feels Like"	—	—	—	—
2	Clifton End	36	"No Mercy"	—	—	✔	✔
3	Gabriella Massa	35	"Strani Amori"	—	✔	✔	✔
4	Irma Derby	42	"Run to You"	✔	—	—	✔
5	Kim K	21	"Demons"	—	—	—	—
6	Graziëlla Hunsel	38	"One Night Only"	—	—	✔	✔
7	Kelly Cossee	20	"Hit The Road Jack"	—	—	✔	✔
8	Jabran DeMoore	22	"Cry Me a River"	—	—	—	—
9	Jackie Teerenstra	18	"Teardrops"	—	—	—	✔
10	Marvin Verwijk	24	"Can't Stop Me"	—	—	—	—
11	Frank van Oudhuizen	22	"Time After Time"	✔	—	✔	✔
12	Anita Makkinje	24	"We Found Love"	—	✔	—	—
13	Angela Vergouwen	28	"I Want to Know What Love Is"	✔	✔	✔	✔

=== Episode 7 (October 10) ===
Order	Artist	Age	Song	Coach's and contestant's choices			
Order	Artist	Age	Song	Ilse	Ali B	Marco	Trijntje
1	Sotiri Antonakoudis	23	"When Summer Ends"	—	✔	✔	—
2	Tamzie Duarte Fransen	38	"Not That Kind"	—	—	—	—
3	Whitney Eblé	19	"What Goes Around... Comes Around"	—	✔	—	—
4	Lewi-Sara Siahaya	20	"XO"	✔	—	—	—
5	Daisy van Lingen	26	"Master Blaster (Jammin')"	—	✔	—	✔
6	Leon van Dijk	22	"Story of My Life"	—	—	—	—
7	Angie White	20	"Trumpets"	—	—	—	—
8	Eva Franken	19	"Good God"	—	✔	✔	—
9	Pam Feather	28	"Three Little Birds"	—	—	—	—
10	Duncan de Moor	20	"Sing"	✔	✔	✔	—
11	Fernando Groenhart	25	"Wake Up Everybody"	—	—	—	—
12	Ese van Gils	17	"Kop in het Zand"	—	—	—	—
13	Britt Lenting	27	"Love Me Just a Little Bit More"	—	—	✔	—

Coachs	Aantal buzz	Aantal keer gekozen	Anatal Keren geweigerd	Hij draaide zich niet om	Alleen om te keren
Ilse DeLange	33	13	20	54	2
Ali B	45	13	30	42	2
Marco	43	11	30	44	2
Trijntje	43	14	28	44	1

== The Battle Rounds ==
The battle rounds determine which candidates from each team move on to the live shows. Two (or three) contestants from within a team are paired together to sing the same song, and ultimately, only eight candidates per team advance to the live shows. Continuing from season 4, each coach is allowed to steal one contestant from another coach's team. New for this season is that the studio audience can vote on contestants (through their own mobile phones). They can vote for that contestant (red vs. blue), thus helping influence the coach's decision on who moves on. Furthermore, since both Ilse and Ali B ended the blind auditions with 15 contestants each, 3 from each team were required to battle and one was taken through, while the others were then able to be stolen.

Color key:

Artist won the Battle and advanced to the Clash Rounds
Artist lost the Battle but was stolen by another coach and advanced to the Clash Rounds
Artist lost the Battle and was eliminated

Episode	Coach	Order	Winner	Song	Loser	'Steal' result			
Episode	Coach	Order	Winner	Song	Loser	Ilse	Ali B	Marco	Trijntje
Episode 8	Ali B	1	Ruben Tarmidi	"Without You"	Whitney Eblé	—	—N/a	—	—
Episode 8	Trijntje Oosterhuis	2	Romy Monteiro	"Unfaithful"	Robin Kappetein	—	—	—	—N/a
Episode 8	Ilse DeLange	3	Duncan de Moor	"Love Runs Out"	Rob de Nijs	—N/a	✔	✔	✔
Episode 8	Marco Borsato	4	Dynah Dettingmeijer	"Higher Ground"	Sabine Uitslag	—	—	Steal used	—
Episode 8	Ali B	5	Ferry de Ruiter	"Killing Me Softly"	Sotiri Antonakoudis	—	—N/a	Steal used	—
Episode 8	Trijntje Oosterhuis	6	Daisy van Lingen	"Happy"	Kelly Cossee	✔	✔	Steal used	—N/a
Episode 8	Ilse DeLange	7	Megan Brands	"Diamonds"	Eva Treurniet	Steal used	—	Steal used	—
Episode 8	Ilse DeLange	7	Megan Brands	"Diamonds"	Roos van der Hoeven	Steal used	—	Steal used	—
Episode 9	Marco Borsato	1	Graziëlla Hunsel	"Mesmerized"	Lucette Snellenburg	Steal used	—	Steal used	—
Episode 9	Ilse DeLange	2	Pip Alblas	"Hotel California"	Vivian Tarmidi	Steal used	—	Steal used	—
Episode 9	Ali B	3	April & Dr. Rum*	"Nothin' on You"	Both contestants advanced	Steal used	—N/a	Steal used	—N/a
Episode 9	Trijntje Oosterhuis	4	Dennis Kroon	"Ordinary Love"	Remko Harms	Steal used	—	Steal used	—N/a
Episode 9	Marco Borsato	5	Bella	"Rather Be"	Britt Lenting	Steal used	—	Steal used	—
Episode 9	Ali B	6	Guus Mulder	"Crazy"	Alejandro Veenaas	Steal used	—N/a	Steal used	—
Episode 9	Marco Borsato	7	O'G3NE	"I See Fire"	Gabriella Massa	Steal used	✔	Steal used	—
Episode 10	Marco Borsato	1	Abigail Martina	"Say You'll Be There"	Danique van der Vlugt	Steal used	Steal used	Steal used	—
Episode 10	Ilse DeLange	2	Angela Vergouwen	"I Knew You Were Trouble"	Irma Derby	Steal used	Steal used	Steal used	—
Episode 10	Trijntje Oosterhuis	3	Sherefa Yorks	"The Boy Is Mine"	Jackie Teerenstra	Steal used	Steal used	Steal used	—N/a
Episode 10	Ali B	4	Renee de Ruijter	"One"	Erik Lindeman	Steal used	Steal used	Steal used	—
Episode 10	Ilse DeLange	5	Frank van Oudhuizen	"Multiply"	Pim Kouwenhoven	Steal used	Steal used	Steal used	✔
Episode 10	Marco Borsato	6	Sjors van der Panne	"Iedereen is van de Wereld"	Mirjam van der Loo	Steal used	Steal used	Steal used	Steal used
Episode 10	Trijntje Oosterhuis	7	David Dam	"Just the Way You Are"	Eddie Conard	Steal used	Steal used	Steal used	Steal used
Episode 11	Ilse DeLange	1	Kimberley Janice	"Problem"	Yorlenie	Steal used	Steal used	Steal used	Steal used
Episode 11	Ali B	2	Vincent Vilouca	"This Is What It Feels Like"	Anita Makkinje	Steal used	Steal used	Steal used	Steal used
Episode 11	Marco Borsato	3	MELL	"I Want You Back"	Anne Postma	Steal used	Steal used	Steal used	Steal used
Episode 11	Trijntje Oosterhuis	4	Eloy Smit	"Am I Wrong"	Clifton End	Steal used	Steal used	Steal used	Steal used
Episode 11	Ilse DeLange	5	Sietske Oosterhuis	"Take Me to Church"	Lewi-Sara Siahaya	Steal used	Steal used	Steal used	Steal used
Episode 11	Ali B	6	Martha Hertogs	"Ain't No Sunshine"	Eva Franken	Steal used	Steal used	Steal used	Steal used
Episode 11	Ali B	6	Martha Hertogs	"Ain't No Sunshine"	Julia Duiker	Steal used	Steal used	Steal used	Steal used
Episode 11	Trijntje Oosterhuis	7	Emmaly Brown	"Love the Way You Lie"	Jaël Been	Steal used	Steal used	Steal used	Steal used

== Live Shows ==
=== The Clashes ===
New this season are the Live Clash Rounds. In the first two live shows have 2 contestants (from the same team) sing 2 songs, going from one contestant to another and then repeating that process one more time. Each coach pairs two contestant to face. Immediately after The Clash gives points [out of 100] to each contestant (ex. 60/40). In the meantime, people can also give points [out of 100] to contestants through calls, text messages or votes via their smartphone or tablet from the free Red Room app during a voting window. All points are added up, and this determines which contestant is the winner of The Clash and continues to live show 3.

==== The Clashes 1 ====
Competition performances

Order	Coach	Contestant	1st song	2nd song	Coach Points	Fan Points	Total	Result
1	Marco Borsato	Rob de Nijs	"With You"	"Feeling Good"	60	64.1	124.1	Advances
1	Marco Borsato	Graziëlla Hunsel	"Hit 'Em Up Style (Oops!)"	"It's A Man's World"	40	35.9	75.9	Eliminated
2	Ilse DeLange	Megan Brands	"Clown"	"Earth Song"	40	73.0	113.0	Advances
2	Ilse DeLange	Kimberley Janice	"Stay"	"Don't Speak"	60	27.0	87.0	Eliminated
3	Ali B	Guus Mulder	"The Pieces Don't Fit Anymore"	"When I Was Your Man"	60	57.0	117.0	Advances
3	Ali B	Vincent Vilouca	"Nothing Really Matters"	"Father Figure"	40	43.0	83.0	Eliminated
4	Trijntje Oosterhuis	Emmaly Brown	"Dream On"	"Listen"	65	77.3	142.3	Advances
4	Trijntje Oosterhuis	Daisy van Lingen	"Finally"	"Nobody's Perfect"	35	22.7	57.7	Eliminated
5	Ilse DeLange	Sietske Oosterhuis	"Strong"	"Hideaway"	55	70.9	125.9	Advances
5	Ilse DeLange	Pip Alblas	"Toxic"	"Somebody That I Used to Know"	45	29.1	74.1	Eliminated
6	Ali B	Renee de Ruijter	"Unconditionally"	"Wrecking Ball"	60	65.4	125.4	Advances
6	Ali B	Martha Hertogs	"Skyfall"	"Can't Help Falling in Love"	40	34.6	74.6	Eliminated
7	Marco Borsato	Sjors van der Panne	"Alles is Liefde"	"Mag Ik Dan Bij Jou"	70	70.6	140.6	Advances
7	Marco Borsato	Dynah Dettingmeijer	"Price Tag"	"Lost"	30	29.4	59.4	Eliminated
8	Trijntje Oosterhuis	David Dam	"Who's Loving You"	"Beggin'"	65	57.4	122.4	Advances
8	Trijntje Oosterhuis	Eloy Smit	"More"	"Sexy and I Know It"	35	42.6	77.6	Eliminated

Non-competition performances
Order	Performer	Song
1	Ariana Grande (with Emmaly Brown, Daisy van Lingen, David Dam, and Eloy Smit)	"Problem"
2	Ariana Grande	"Break Free"

==== The Clashes 2 ====
Competitor performances

Order	Coach	Contestant	1st Song	2nd Song	Coach Points	Fan Points	Total	Result
1	Marco Borsato	MELL	"Black Horse and the Cherry Tree"	"Not Over You"	70	88.0	158.0	Advances
1	Marco Borsato	Bella	"Counting Stars"	"Dark Horse"	30	12.0	42.0	Eliminated
2	Ali B	April & Dr. Rum	"Wiggle"	"911"	70	58.7	128.7	Advances
2	Ali B	Ruben Tarmidi	"Ten Feet Tall"	"I Have Nothing"	30	41.3	71.3	Eliminated
3	Ilse DeLange	Duncan de Moor	"Streets"	"Impossible"	80	80.4	160.4	Advances
3	Ilse DeLange	Frank van Oudhuizen	"No Diggity"	"Rude"	20	19.6	39.6	Eliminated
4	Trijntje Oosterhuis	Romy Monteiro	"Roar"	"Hero"	65	75.0	140.0	Advances
4	Trijntje Oosterhuis	Sherefa Yorks	"The Climb"	"Come On Over"	35	25.0	60.0	Eliminated
5	Ali B	Ferry de Ruiter	"Halo"	"Bad Romance"	65	58.8	123.8	Advances
5	Ali B	Gabriella Massa	"Won't Look Back"	"Ghost"	35	41.2	76.2	Eliminated
6	Trijntje Oosterhuis	Dennis Kroon	"Let Her Go"	"Nobody to Love"	70	60.8	130.8	Advances
6	Trijntje Oosterhuis	Pim Kouwenhoven	"Fireball"	"Superheroes"	30	39.2	69.2	Eliminated
7	Ilse DeLange	Kelly Cossee	"Chasing Pavements"	"Don't"	60	67.3	127.3	Advances
7	Ilse DeLange	Angela Vergouwen	"Raggamuffin"	"P.Y.T. (Pretty Young Thing)"	40	32.7	72.7	Eliminated
8	Marco Borsato	O'G3NE	"Mirrors"	"Story of My Life"	70	71.0	141.0	Advances
8	Marco Borsato	Abigail Martina	"Love on Top"	"Girl on Fire"	30	29.0	59.0	Eliminated

Non-competition performances
Order	Performer	Song
1	Julia van der Toorn & Team Borsato (Bella, MELL, O'G3NE, and Abigail Martina)	"Empire State of Mind (Part II) Broken Down"
2	Julia van der Toorn	"You & I"

=== Liveshow 3 ===
Competitor performances

Order	Coach	Contestant	Song	Result
1.1	Ilse DeLange	Megan Brands	"Domino"	Ilse's choice
1.2	Ilse DeLange	Sietske Oosterhuis	"Papaoutai"	Public choice
1.3	Ilse DeLange	Kelly Cossee	"Rolling in the Deep"	Eliminated
1.4	Ilse DeLange	Duncan de Moor	"Fire"	Public choice
2.1	Marco Borsato	Rob de Nijs	"The Days"	Eliminated
2.2	Marco Borsato	MELL	"How Am I Supposed to Live Without You"	Marco's choice
2.3	Marco Borsato	O'G3NE	"Buttons"	Public choice
2.4	Marco Borsato	Sjors van der Panne	"Laat Me Niet Alleen"	Public choice
3.1	Ali B	Guus Mulder	"Casanova"	Public choice
3.2	Ali B	April & Dr. Rum	"It Wasn't Me"	Public choice
3.3	Ali B	Ferry de Ruiter	"(You Make Me Feel Like) A Natural Woman"	Ali's choice
3.4	Ali B	Renee de Ruijter	"All About That Bass"	Eliminated
4.1	Trijntje Oosterhuis	Dennis Kroon	"In De Shaduw (In The Shadows)"	Eliminated
4.2	Trijntje Oosterhuis	Romy Monteiro	"Hurt"	Trijntje's choice
4.3	Trijntje Oosterhuis	David Dam	"I'm Not The Only One"	Public choice
4.4	Trijntje Oosterhuis	Emmaly Brown	"New York, New York"	Public choice

Non-competition performances
Order	Performer	Song
1	Kensington (with Duncan de Moor and Guus Mulder)	"Streets"

=== Liveshow 4 ===
Competitor performances

Order	Coach	Contestant	Song	Result
1.1	Ali B	April & Dr. Rum	"Billionaire"	Public Choice
1.2	Ali B	Guus Mulder	"Thinking Out Loud"	Ali's Choice
1.3	Ali B	Ferry de Ruiter	"Think"	Eliminated
2.1	Ilse DeLange	Duncan de Moor	"She Wolf"	Public Choice
2.2	Ilse DeLange	Sietske Oosterhuis	"Dangerous"	Eliminated
2.3	Ilse DeLange	Megan Brands	"A Woman's Worth"	Ilse's Choice
3.1	Trijntje Oosterhuis	Emmaly Brown	"Bang Bang"	Trijntje's Choice
3.2	Trijntje Oosterhuis	David Dam	"Let's Stay Together"	Public Choice
3.3	Trijntje Oosterhuis	Romy Monteiro	"Crazy in Love"	Eliminated
4.1	Marco Borsato	MELL	"Secrets"	Eliminated
4.2	Marco Borsato	O'G3NE	"Change Will Come"	Public Choice
4.3	Marco Borsato	Sjors van der Panne	"Als Ze Er Niet Is"	Marco's Choice

Non-competition performances
Order	Performer	Song
1	The Script (with Ferry de Ruiter and MELL)	"Superheroes"
2	The Script	"No Good in Goodbye"

=== Cross Battles/Semi Finals ===
The semifinal is slightly different than the other live shows. In 'The Cross Battles', the coaches go into battle with contestants from other teams. By a draw, two contestants of different teams were paired. These two contestants competed against each other, but singing their own song. Viewers at home determined the winner of the cross battles. Four finalists were chosen, but the chances were high that a coach would not have a finalist for the final. This happened to Ilse Delange when her remaining two contestants were eliminated.

Competitor performances

Order	Coach	Contestant	Song	Public Vote %	Result
1.1	Ali B	April & Dr. Rum	"Hey, Soul Sister" / "Whistle"	32.6	Eliminated
1.2	Marco Borsato	Sjors van der Panne	"De Verzoening"	67.4	Safe
2.1	Marco Borsato	O'G3NE	"Hold On"	78.5	Safe
2.2	Ilse DeLange	Megan Brands	"Love Is a Battlefield"	21.5	Eliminated
3.1	Ilse DeLange	Duncan de Moor	"Iris"	36.7	Eliminated
3.2	Trijntje Oosterhuis	Emmaly Brown	"Beautiful"	63.3	Safe
4.1	Trijntje Oosterhuis	David Dam	"Love Never Felt So Good"	49.7	Eliminated
4.2	Ali B	Guus Mulder	"You Give Me Something"	50.3	Safe

Non-competition performances
Order	Performer	Song
1	Trijntje Oosterhuis	"Walk Along"

Finalist performances

After the announcement of the finalists sang finalist his / her winner's single. Then people could download their favorite single by iTunes. During the week prior to the final, people can download their songs, which is worth one vote for that finalist.

Order	Contestant	Song
1	Sjors van der Panne	"In het zicht van de haven"
2	O'G3NE	"Magic"
3	Emmaly Brown	"Stay or Go"
4	Guus Mulder	"The Story Behind the Song"

These are the songs that the eliminated semi-finalists would have sung if they had been voted into the finale:

- April & Dr. Rum - "Bulletproof"
- Megan Brands - "There Is Love"
- Duncan de Moor - "Broken Promises"
- David Dam - "Grateful"

=== Finale ===
Competitor performances

Order	Coach	Contestant	Song	Order	Song (Duet)	Duet with	Result
1	Marco Borsato	Sjors van der Panne	"Laat Me Niet Alleen"	8	"Zeg Me Dat Het Niet Zo Is"	Frank Boeijen	Runner-up
5	Trijntje Oosterhuis	Emmaly Brown	"Titanium"	2	"Love on Top"	Trijntje Oosterhuis	4th Place
3	Ali B	Guus Mulder	"When I Was Your Man"	6	"Slave to The Music"	Ali B	3rd Place
7	Marco Borsato	O'G3NE	"Emotion"	4	"Change Will Come"	Alain Clark	Winner

Non-competition performances

Order	Performers	Song
1	Di-rect, Fedde le Grand & the 4 finalists	"Where We Belong"
2	Emmaly Brown	"Stay or Go"
3	Mr. Probz	"Nothing Really Matters"
4	Guus Mulder	"The Story Behind the Song"
5	Zerotwenty	"Break My Heart Again"

Result

After the competition performances, Emmaly was eliminated and then sang her single. Then viewers could vote for O'G3NE, Sjors and Guus. After 10 minutes, Guus was eliminated and then sang his single. Then finalists O'G3NE and Sjors sang their singles to win the final vote. Afterwards, O'G3NE was crowned the winner of The Voice of Holland 2014 while Sjors finished in 2nd place. With the win, O'G3NE became the first trio to win the competition on any international version of The Voice.

Order	Performer	Song	Fan Vote %	Result
1	Sjors van der Panne	"In het zicht van de haven"	46.3	Runner-up
2	O'G3NE	"Magic"	53.7	Winner

== Elimination Chart ==
=== Overall ===
Color key
Artist's info

- Artist from Team Trijntje
- Artist from Team Ali B
- Artist from Team Ilse
- Artist from Team Borsato

Result details

- Winner
- Runner-up
- Third place
- Fourth place
- Artist was saved by the public vote
- Artist was saved by his/her coach
- Artist was eliminated

Live show results per week
Artist	Week 1	Week 2	Week 3	Week 4	Semi-Finals	Finals	
Artist	Week 1	Week 2	Week 3	Week 4	Semi-Finals	Round 1	Round 2
O'G3NE	—N/a	Safe	Safe	Safe	Safe	Safe	Winner
Sjors van der Panne	Safe	—N/a	Safe	Safe	Safe	Safe	Runner-Up
Guus Mulder	Safe	—N/a	Safe	Safe	Safe	3rd place	Eliminated (Finals Round 1)
Emmaly Brown	Safe	—N/a	Safe	Safe	Safe	4th place	Eliminated (Finals Round 1)
David Dam	Safe	—N/a	Safe	Safe	Eliminated	Eliminated (Semi-Finals)	
Duncan de Moor	—N/a	Safe	Safe	Safe	Eliminated	Eliminated (Semi-Finals)	
April & Dr. Rum	—N/a	Safe	Safe	Safe	Eliminated	Eliminated (Semi-Finals)	
Megan Brands	Safe	—N/a	Safe	Safe	Eliminated	Eliminated (Semi-Finals)	
Ferry de Ruiter	—N/a	Safe	Safe	Eliminated	Eliminated (Week 4)		
MELL	—N/a	Safe	Safe	Eliminated	Eliminated (Week 4)		
Romy Monteiro	—N/a	Safe	Safe	Eliminated	Eliminated (Week 4)		
Sietske Oosterhuis	Safe	—N/a	Safe	Eliminated	Eliminated (Week 4)		
Dennis Kroon	—N/a	Safe	Eliminated	Eliminated (Week 3)			
Kelly Cossee	—N/a	Safe	Eliminated	Eliminated (Week 3)			
Renee de Ruitjer	Safe	—N/a	Eliminated	Eliminated (Week 3)			
Rob de Nijs	Safe	—N/a	Eliminated	Eliminated (Week 3)			
Abigail Martina	—N/a	Eliminated	Eliminated (Week 2)				
Angela Vergouwen	—N/a	Eliminated	Eliminated (Week 2)				
Bella	—N/a	Eliminated	Eliminated (Week 2)				
Frank Van Oudhuizen	—N/a	Eliminated	Eliminated (Week 2)				
Gabriella Massa	—N/a	Eliminated	Eliminated (Week 2)				
Pim Kouwenhoven	—N/a	Eliminated	Eliminated (Week 2)				
Ruben Tarmidi	—N/a	Eliminated	Eliminated (Week 2)				
Sherefa Yorks	—N/a	Eliminated	Eliminated (Week 2)				
Daisy Van Lingen	Eliminated	Eliminated (Week 1)					
Dynah Dettingmeijer	Eliminated	Eliminated (Week 1)					
Eloy Smit	Eliminated	Eliminated (Week 1)					
Graziella Hunsel	Eliminated	Eliminated (Week 1)					
Kimberly Janice	Eliminated	Eliminated (Week 1)					
Martha Hertogs	Eliminated	Eliminated (Week 1)					
Pip Alblas	Eliminated	Eliminated (Week 1)					
Vincent Vilouca	Eliminated	Eliminated (Week 1)					

== Team ==
- Artist from Team Trijntje
- Artist from Team Ali B
- Artist from Team Ilse
- Artist from Team Borsato

Result details

- Winner
- Runner-up
- Third place
- Fourth place
- Eliminated
- Artist Saved by his/her coach

Live show results per week
Artist	Week 1	Week 2	Week 3	Week 4	Semi-Finals	Finals	
Artist	Week 1	Week 2	Week 3	Week 4	Semi-Finals	Round 1	Round 2
Emmaly Brown	Advanced	—N/a	Advanced	Advanced	Advanced	4th place	
David Dam	Advanced	—N/a	Advanced	Advanced	Eliminated		
Romy Monteiro	—N/a	Advanced	Advanced	Eliminated			
Dennis Kroon	—N/a	Advanced	Eliminated				
Pim Kouwenhoven	—N/a	Eliminated					
Sherefa Yorks	—N/a	Eliminated					
Daisy Van Lingen	Eliminated						
Eloy Smit	Eliminated						
Guus Mulder	Advanced	—N/a	Advanced	Advanced	Advanced	3rd place	
April en Dr. Drum	—N/a	Advanced	Advanced	Advanced	Eliminated		
Ferry de Ruiter	—N/a	Advanced	Advanced	Eliminated			
Renee de Ruitjer	Advanced	—N/a	Eliminated				
Gabriella Massa	—N/a	Eliminated					
Ruben Tarmidi	—N/a	Eliminated					
Martha Hertogs	Eliminated						
Vincent Vilouca	Eliminated						
Duncan de Moor	—N/a	Advanced	Advanced	Advanced	Eliminated		
Megan Brands	Advanced	—N/a	Advanced	Advanced	Eliminated		
Sietske Oosterhuis	Advanced	—N/a	Advanced	Eliminated			
Kelly Cossee	—N/a	Advanced	Eliminated				
Angela Vergouwen	—N/a	Eliminated					
Frank van Oudhuizen	—N/a	Eliminated					
Kimberly Janice	Eliminated						
Pip Alblas	Eliminated						
O'G3NE	—N/a	Advanced	Advanced	Advanced	Advanced	Advanced	Winner
Sjors van der Panne	Advanced	—N/a	Advanced	Advanced	Advanced	Advanced	Runner-Up
MELL	—N/a	Advanced	Advanced	Eliminated			
Rob de Nijs	Advanced	—N/a	Eliminated				
Abigail Martina	—N/a	Eliminated					
Bella	—N/a	Eliminated					
Dynah Dettingmeijer	Eliminated						
Graziella Hunsel	Eliminated						
