= Rosemary's Sons =

Dutch band

Rosemary's Sons is a Dutch band that makes music described as mainstream pop/rock and rootsrock. The band formed in 1998. With their debut album on Warner Music, All in Hand in 2002, they scored a minor hit with the single "Shine", which featured Dutch country/pop singer Ilse DeLange.

== Biography ==
Rosemary's Sons was founded in Breda, Netherlands, in 1998 by a group of teenage friends. The band released an independent CD, Misery Loves Company, which got immediate attention from record label Warner Music. In 2001, Warner offered the band, which had become quite popular in their hometown, a record deal. Led by producer Oscar Holleman (Krezip, Heideroosjes), they released their debut album All in Hand. The album features guest appearances by Ilse deLange and Ren van Barneveld (former Urban Dance Squad). All in Hand was well received and quickly entered the Album Top 100. The first single, "Fall from Grace", was released in August 2001 and became a modest hit. The next single, "Shine" (featuring Ilse deLange), was played often on national radio and TV, made it to the top position in the Cyber Top 50 charts for two consecutive weeks and reached no.34 in the Mega Top 100. Halfway in June, a third single, "Up All Night", was released.

In 2002, guitarist Maarten van Damme (formerly of Abel) joined the band, while they were establishing an impressive live reputation. The band played big summer festivals like Paaspop, Bospop, Dauwpop, and Lowlands. They supported The Cranberries (Heineken Music Hall), Bush, De Dijk and Krezip, and toured in most Dutch music clubs. The hard work earned them an Essent Award and an Edison nomination for best new band of 2002.

In 2004, Warner Music announced that they had to terminate the record deals with local artists/bands including Rosemary's Sons. A few months later, the band along with producer Oscar Holleman started the recording process and got the attention of V2 Music. The indie label released Rosemary's Sons' second album in April 2005. The resulting effort, St. Eleanor's Park, contained rootsy roadsongs, some rock songs and a flirtation with jazz and glamrock.

In 2007 Rosemary's Sons started working on their next album. The song "How About It" received airplay at Omroep Brabant in 2008. In October of that year, the band signed a record deal with CNR Entertainment. A month later, Rosemary's Sons were the supporting act of Stevie Ann twice. Stevie Ann also made a guest appearance in the duet "Perfect" on the album Home Sweet Home. JW Roy sings in the songs "Thin Line" and "Mary-Ann".

== Members ==
- Martijn Hagens – lead vocals, guitar, piano
- Ad van Halteren – bass
- Bart Herber – drums, percussion
- Thomas Lina – keys, tambourine, backing vocals (joined in 1999)
- Maarten van Damme – guitar, lap steel guitar, mandolin, banjo, harmonica, backing vocals (joined in 2001; formerly with Abel)

== Discography ==
=== Albums ===
- Misery Loves Company (1999)
- All in Hand (2002)
- St. Eleanor's Park (2005)
- Home Sweet Home (2009)

=== Singles ===
- "Fall From Grace" (2001)
- "Shine" (2002)
- "Up All Night" (2002)
- "Wrong Way Around" (2005)
- "Queen of Hearts" (2005)
- "St. Eleanor's Park" (2005)
