= Melissa Carper =

American singer

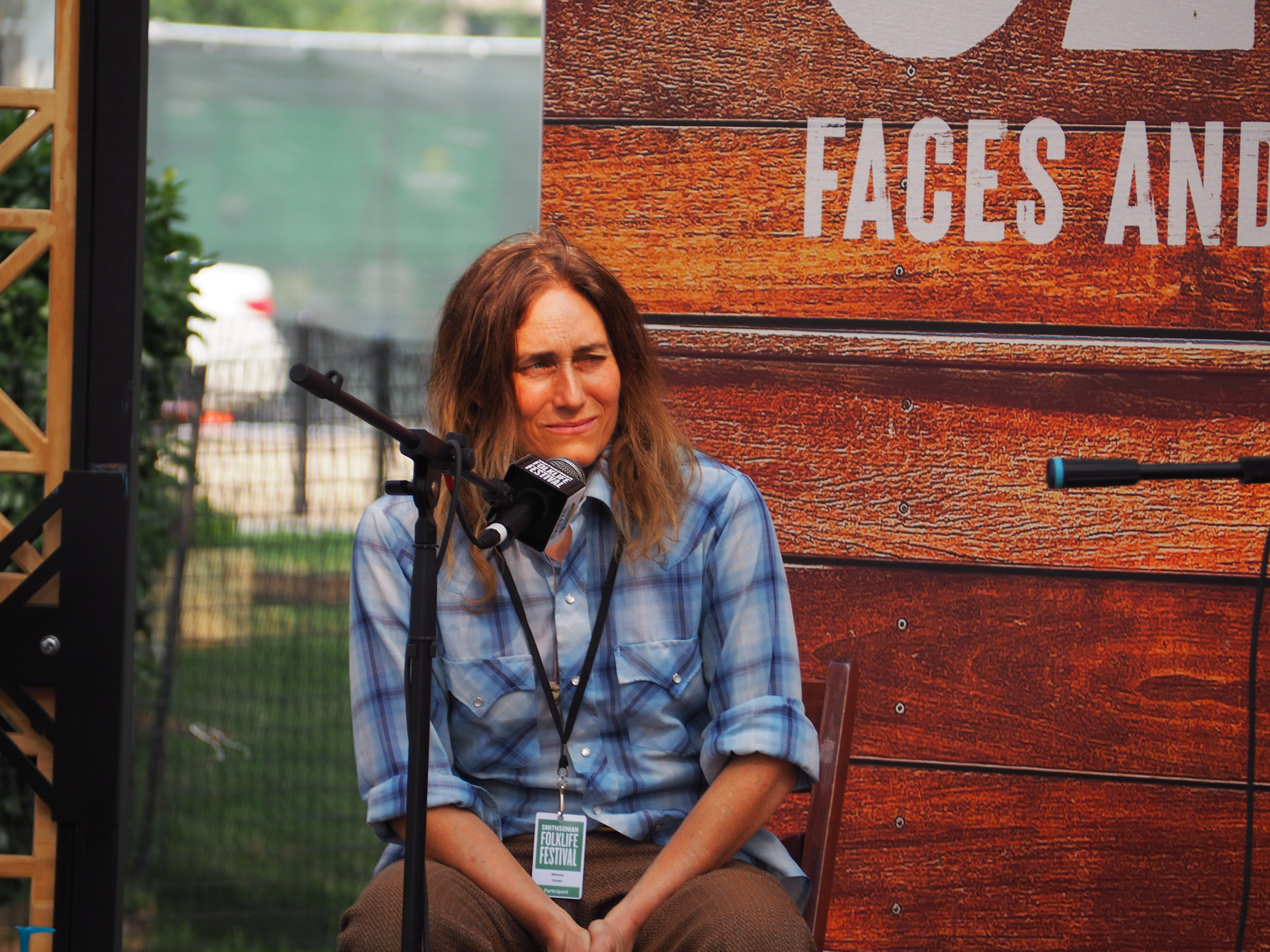

Melissa Carper is an American singer, songwriter and double bassist raised in North Platte, Nebraska, United States. She came from a musical family and started playing bass when she was a child, performing in a family band at churches and rest homes around North Platte. She has traveled the country playing in the oldtime, blues, western swing and country styles.

Carper considered majoring in music in college but left before earning her degree. She then worked at a fish factory in Alaska before moving to Eureka Springs, Arkansas where she could feel comfortable within the local gay community. In 2009 she moved to Austin, Texas and then to Nashville, Tennessee in 2014 where she met Dennis Crouch which led to her first solo album Daddy’s Country Gold recorded in 2021. Her next album Ramblin' Soul was named one of the best country albums in 2022 by Rolling Stone. Carper, Kelly Willis, and Brennen Leigh released a six song EP Wonder Women of Country which was one of The Boston Globe music critics' favorite albums of 2024. Her solo albums Ramblin' Soul (2022) and Borned in Ya (2024) are backed by Americana imprint Thirty Tigers.

Her song "Making Memories" was featured in the closing credits of an episode of Star Trek: Strange New Worlds.

== Collaborations ==
- Brand New Old-Time Songs - Rebecca Patek (2018)
- Daddy's Country Gold - Dennis Crouch (bassist), Andrija Tokic, Brennen Leigh, Sierra Ferrell (2021)
- Wonder Women of Country - Kelly Willis, Brennen Leigh (2023)
