= Nicole Bus =

Dutch singer

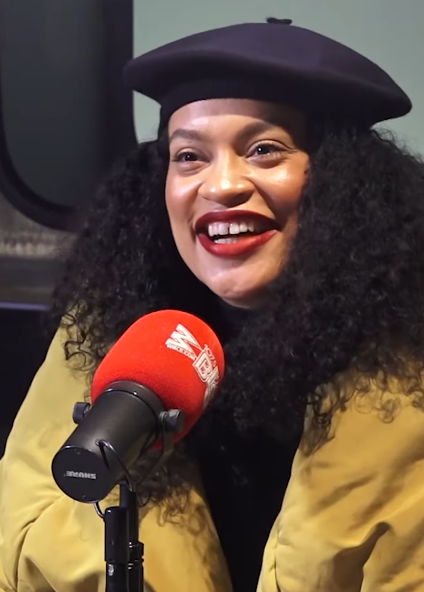
- Bus during an interview in October 2019

Background information
- Born: Nieuwegein, Netherlands
- Genres: R&B; Hip hop; Neo soul
- Occupations: Singer; songwriter
- Years active: 2006–present
- Labels: Roc Nation; Capitol; Universal; TopNotch; Centillionaire; Bladehammer EMI
- Website: www.nicolebus.com

Nicole Bus is a Dutch singer who is currently signed to Roc Nation. Her 2018 single, "You", is tied for the fastest debut single to reach the top of the Billboard Adult R&B Songs chart. She released her American debut studio album, Kairos, in October 2019. Prior to signing to Roc Nation, Bus had released a variety of music in the Netherlands and won the Grote Prijs van Nederland ("Grand Prize of the Netherlands") in the singer-songwriter category in 2010. She also appeared on the Dutch singing competition programs, X Factor and The Voice of Holland.

== Early life and education ==
Nicole Bus was born in Nieuwegein, Netherlands and grew up partially in the municipality of Houten. Her father is Dutch and her mother is Afro-Curaçaoan. Bus was raised in church where she sang and learned how to play a variety of instruments, including guitar, piano, drums, bass, and synthesizers. She began writing songs at age 11. When she was 16, Bus was briefly homeless after her parents separated. In 2006, however, she was a supporting act for American gospel musician, Canton Jones. She also toured as a gospel singer to locations like Israel, Palestine, Nicaragua, and Indonesia in 2008. She would later attend the Pop Academie in Utrecht and the Conservatorium van Amsterdam where she studied music and vocal work and received her diploma in 2016.

== Career ==
In 2009, Bus won a gospel music competition. She followed that by being awarded the Grote Prijs van Nederland ("Grand Prize of the Netherlands") in the singer-songwriter category in 2010. The following year, she released the studio album, The Heart of the Matter on Bladehammer through EMI Netherlands. In 2013, she auditioned for the fifth season of the Dutch singing competition series, X Factor, but did advance beyond the judges. Later that year, she appeared on the fourth season of the singing competition series, The Voice of Holland, where she advanced to the quarterfinals.

In May 2016, she released an EP of Dutch-language tracks called Nederlandse Bodem with the singles, "Zonnestralen" and "Lopen". The project was released by the Dutch label, TopNotch. She later opened for Sandra van Nieuwland on several dates in November and December 2016. In March 2017, she released a Dutch-language album entitled, Magnolia, also through TopNotch. She also taught music lessons at various schools during that time.

Later in 2017, Atlanta-based producer, Needlz, posted an Instagram video featuring Bus' vocals. The Instagram video caught the attention of Roc Nation executives and prompted them to contact Needlz and Bus. In the meantime, she released an independent English-language EP entitled, T.O.T.A, in late 2017. She was ultimately signed to Roc Nation in 2018.

In December of that year, she released her first Roc Nation single, "You", which was produced by Needlz. The single features quoted lyrics from The Charmels' "As Long as I've Got You" and a sample of the Wu Tang Clan's "C.R.E.A.M.". It also became a radio hit in the US, reaching 5.5 million listeners by January 2019 and ultimately topping the Billboard Adult R&B Songs chart in a record-tying amount of time for a debut single (8 weeks). "You" also received several remixes, including those from Ghostface Killah and Rick Ross. In the ensuing months, Bus performed at a number of events, including Summer Jam, Femme It Forward, and the Essence Music Festival. She also opened for Common on his "Let Love Tour" in July 2019.

That month, she released her second single, "Mr. Big Shot", which would also reach the Adult R&B Songs chart, peaking at number 19. In August of that year, she performed a Tiny Desk Concert for NPR Music. On 18 October 2019, she released her American debut studio album, Kairos, on Roc Nation. "Kairos" is the Greek word for "appointed time". The album is co-produced by Bus herself, Needlz, and TL Cross.

== Discography ==
=== Studio albums ===
List of studio albums with selected details
Title	Details
U Alleen	Released: 2010 (NED); Label: Self-released; Formats: Digital download
The Heart of the Matter	Released: 2011 (NED); Label: Bladehammer EMI; Formats: Digital download
Magnolia	Released: 17 March 2017 (NED); Label: TopNotch; Formats: Digital download
Kairos	Released: 18 October 2019 (US); Label: Roc Nation; Formats: Digital download

=== EPs ===
List of studio albums with selected details
Title	Details
Nederlandse Bodem	Released: May 2016 (NED); Label: TopNotch; Formats: Digital download
T.O.T.A	Release date: 8 December 2017 (US); Label: Centillionaire Records; Formats: Digital download

=== Singles ===
Title	Year	Peak chart positions			Album
Title	Year	US Adult R&B	US R&B	US R&B/HH Air	Album
"You"	2018	1	15	12	Kairos
"Mr. Big Shot"	2019	19	—	45	Kairos
"Rain"	2020	14	—	49	Kairos

=== Songwriting credits ===
List of songs written or co-written for other artists
Title	Year	Artist	Album	Ref.
"Sweet Love"	2025	Burna Boy	No Sign of Weakness	
