= The Voice of Holland season 4 =

The Voice of Holland
- Season 4
- Hosted by: Martijn Krabbé; Wendy van Dijk; Winston Gerschtanowitz (Red room)
- Coaches: Marco Borsato; Trijntje Oosterhuis; Ilse DeLange; Ali B
- Winner: Julia van der Toorn
- Winning coach: Marco Borsato
- Runner-up: Mitchell Brunings
- Finals venue: Studio 24 in Hilversum

Release
- Original network: RTL 4
- Original release: 30 August – 21 December 2013

Season chronology
- ← Previous; Season 3 Next → Season 5

The Voice of Holland (season 4) is the fourth season of the Dutch reality singing competition, created by media tycoon John de Mol Jr. and the first sophomore season ever of the show's format. It aired during 2013 on RTL 4 and was announced during broadcasts of the third season of the show. Martijn Krabbé and Wendy van Dijk returned as co-hosts, while Winston Gerschtanowitz returned as host in the red room. Marco Borsato and Trijntje Oosterhuis were the only coaches from season 3 to return for season 4. Nick & Simon and Roel van Velzen were replaced by Ilse DeLange and Ali B after their departures. The winner was Julia van der Toorn, mentored by Borsato. This was the first season where a coach did not win in their first season and the first to have two members of the same team in the final.

One of the important premises of the show is the quality of the singing talent. Four coaches, themselves popular performing artists, train the talents in their group and occasionally perform with them. Talents are selected in blind auditions, where the coaches cannot see, but only hear the auditioner.

== Coaches ==
Nick Schilder of Nick & Simon announced during season 3 in 2012 that he would not be coming back after three seasons of the show, citing burnout being tied almost throughout the year with the show and touring engagements. Roel van Velzen, another veteran of the show who stayed for the initial three seasons, announced he will not be sitting as a coach for a fourth time around. Ilse DeLange and Ali B then joined returning coaches Marco Borsato and Trijntje Oosterhuis for season 4.

== Teams ==
Color key

Winner
Runner-up
Third
Fourth
Eliminated in Semi-Final (Cross Battles)

Eliminated in Quarter-Final
Eliminated in the Live Rounds
Artist was stolen by another coach (Name is strikethroughed)
Eliminated in the Battle rounds

Coaches	Top 56 artists			
Trijntje Oosterhuis				
Trijntje Oosterhuis	Shirma Rouse	Wudstik	Nicole Bus	Steffen Morrison
Trijntje Oosterhuis	Matt Heanes	Sanne Klein Horsman	Nikay Agterhuis	Nikita Doornbosch
Trijntje Oosterhuis	Auke Busman	Bibi Espina	Arjen Baakman	Sansika de Groot
Trijntje Oosterhuis	Sandy Goeree	~~Cheyenne Toney~~	~~Jarno Ibarra~~	
Ali B				
Ali B	Jill Helena	Jennifer Lynn	Vince Irie	Colin de Vries
Ali B	Imelda	Annika Boxhoorn	Yuli Minguel	Jarno Ibarra
Ali B	Jolene Grunberg	Jody Kailola	Marjon van Iwaarden	Emy Perez
Ali B	Anne Wilson	Lauren ter Horst	Khadija Tribou	
Ilse de Lange				
Ilse de Lange	Mitchell Brunings	Cheyenne Toney	Coosje Smid	Bylear Sumter
Ilse de Lange	Darren van der Lek	Lizzy Ossevoort	Gaby Boterkooper	Roy de Valk
Ilse de Lange	Mariska Brink	Julia van der Meulen	Isabel Nolte	Arjan van der Kraan
Ilse de Lange	Sonny Sinay	~~Sanne Klein Horsman~~	~~Steven de Geus~~	
Marco Borsato				
Marco Borsato	Julia van der Toorn	Gerrie Dantuma	Märel Bijveld	Marvin Kneefel
Marco Borsato	Fantine Thó	Grant Scott	Steven de Geus	Sarah van der Meer
Marco Borsato	Dominique Rombouts	Maghen Hilgersum	Angel d’Amor	Lisan Bekhuis
Marco Borsato	Jolanda Derks	Ron van den Hoogenband	Daan Wolfs	
Stolen contestants are italicized.
