= One Love: The Bob Marley Musical =

2015 musical written by Kwame Kwei-Armah

One Love:
- The Bob Marley Musical
- Artwork for Birmingham production
- Music: Bob Marley
- Lyrics: Bob Marley
- Book: Kwame Kwei-Armah
- Basis: The life and music of Bob Marley
- Premiere: 13 May 2015: Center Stage, Baltimore
- Productions: 2015 Baltimore; 2017 Birmingham

One Love: The Bob Marley Musical previously titled Marley is a musical based on the life and music of Bob Marley, written by Kwame Kwei-Armah.

== Background and productions ==
=== Center Stage, Baltimore (2015) ===
The musical received its world premiere under the original name of Marley at Center Stage in Baltimore, Maryland, and ran from May 13 to June 14, 2015 with previews from May 8. It was directed by Center Stage artistic director and playwright Kwame Kwei-Armah, choreographed by Germaul Barnes, scenic design by Neil Patel, costume design by ESOSA, lighting design by Michelle Habeck and sound design by Shane Rettig. The cast included Mitchell Brunings as Bob Marley, Saycon Sengbloh as Rita Marley, Michael Luwoye as Peter Tosh, Howard W. Overshown as Michael Manley, David Heron as Tony Welsh, John- Andrew Morrison as Claudie Massop, Damian Thompson as Bunny Wailer and Michaela Waters as Cindy Breakspeare.

=== Birmingham Repertory Theatre (2017) ===
On 30 September 2016 it was announced that the musical will make its UK premiere under the new title, One Love: The Bob Marley Musical, with Kwei-Armah directing at the Birmingham Repertory Theatre from 10 March to 8 April 2017, before being extended to 15 April due to popular demand. The production was produced by The REP in association with Playful Productions and Stage Play Limited. Following the original Baltimore production, Mitchell Brunings returned to the role of Bob Marley with a cast that included Alexia Khadime as Rita Marley, Jacade Simpson as Peter Tosh, Adrian Irvine as Michael Manley, Ricardo Coke-Thomas as Tohy Welsh, Claudie Massop as Thomas Vernal, Newtion Matthews as Bunny Wailer and Cat Simmons as Cindy Breakspeare and Marcquelle Ward as DJ Sway/first cover Bob Marley.

Kwei-Armah stated that this production was "50% different than the Baltimore run".

== Musical numbers ==
=== Birmingham production ===
Act I

- "Simmer Down"
- "I Shot The Sheriff"
- "Guava Jelly"
- "Sun Is Shining"
- "I'm Hurting Inside"
- "Concrete Jungle" / "Get Up Stand Up"
- "Stir It Up"
- "Is This Love?"
- "Forever Loving Jah"
- "No More Trouble"
- "Burnin' And Lootin'"
- "Them Belly Full"
- "War"

Act II

- "Running Away"
- "Is This Love" (reprise)
- "Punky Reggae Party"
- "Waiting in Vain" / "No Woman No Cry"
- "Wake Up And Live"
- "Turn The Lights Down"
- "So Much Things To Say" / "Guiltiness" / "The Heathen"
- "Redemption Song"
- "Exodus"
- "Jammin'
- Finale: "Three Little Birds" / "Get Up Stand Up" / "One Love"

== See also ==
- Get Up, Stand Up! The Bob Marley Musical, a 2021 musical with a similar concept
