= Mitchell Brunings =

Surinamese singer

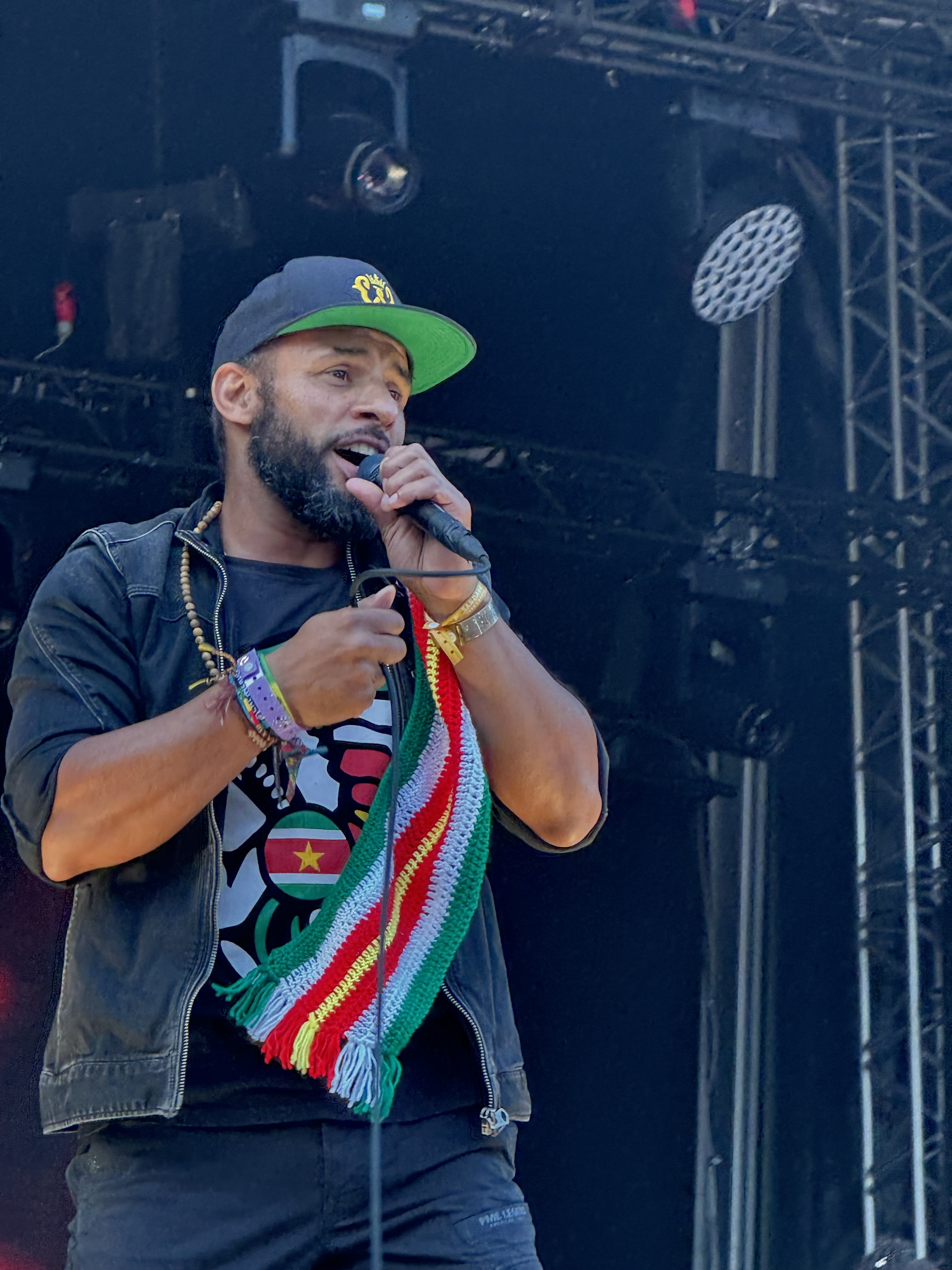
Mitchell Brunings during a concert in August 2024

Mitchell Brunings is a Dutch musician known for his vocal resemblance to Bob Marley.

== Early life ==
Brunings was born in 1989 in Suriname and raised in the Netherlands.

== Career ==
=== The Voice ===
Brunings began his musical journey while working as a nurse at a psychiatric hospital in Holland.

Brunings had been a member of a successful Bob Marley tribute band in the Netherlands. However, he came to worldwide attention in 2013 when he auditioned for the fourth season of the popular TV singing competition The Voice of Holland.

During his blind audition, Brunings captivated the audience with his rendition of Bob Marley's iconic Redemption Song. with a YouTube clip of his audition going viral.

Brunings finished the competition as that season's runner-up.

=== One Love musical ===
In 2015, Brunings was approached to play the lead role in the musical One Love: The Bob Marley Musical. Directed by Kwame Kwei-Armah, the production delved into the life and music of Bob Marley.

Despite having no prior acting experience, Brunings was chosen for the role due to his vocal resemblance to Bob Marley.

The musical premiered in Baltimore on 6 May 2015, and featured many of Marley's most popular songs.

=== Frontman for the Wailers ===
In 2022, Brunings joined The Wailers as their new lead vocalist. The Wailers are a spinoff band of the original Bob Marley and the Wailers which was formed in 1989 by the group's original bassist, Aston "Familyman" Barrett.
