= Shirma Rouse =

Dutch singer

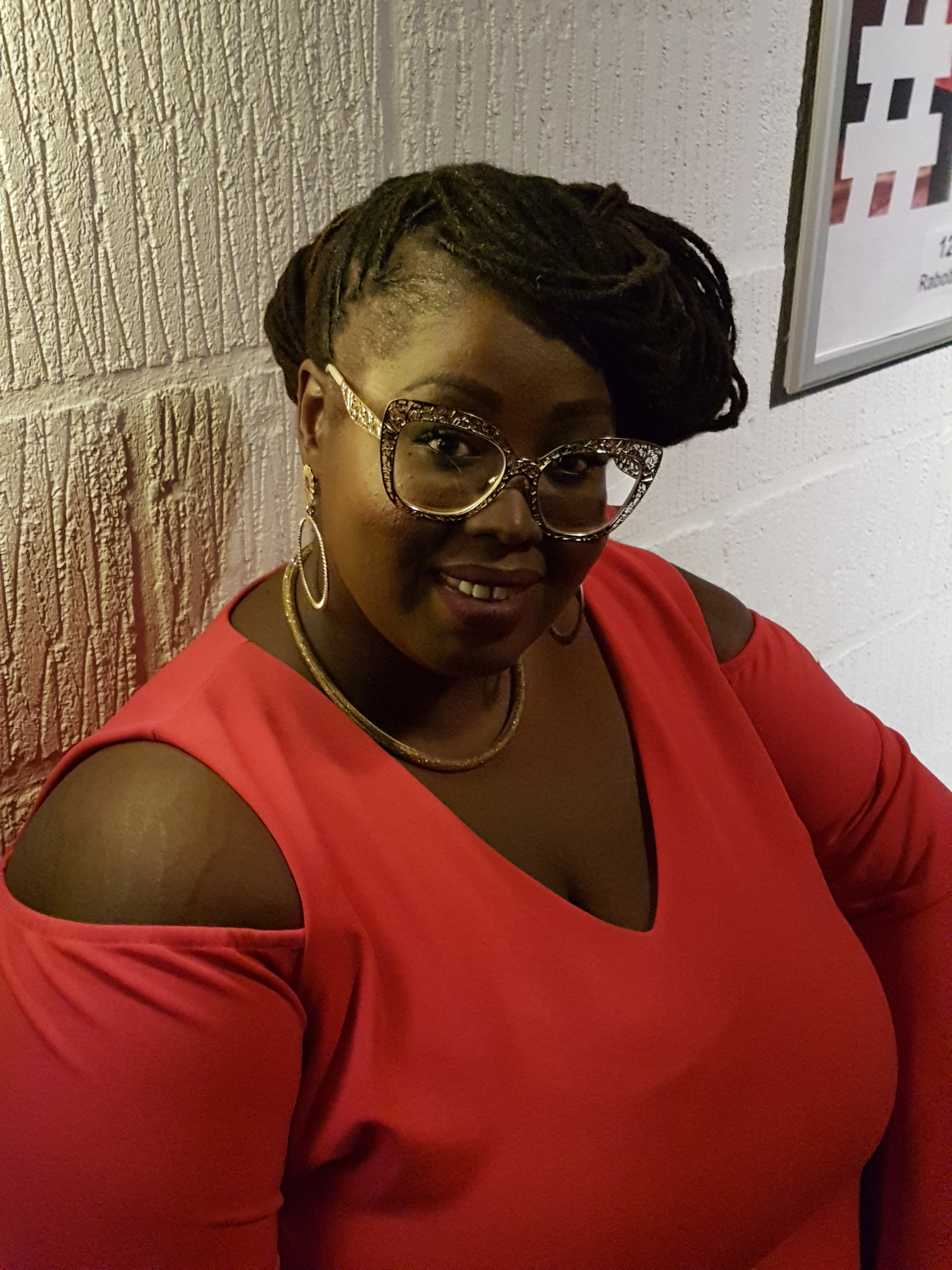
- Rouse in 2020

Background information
- Born: Shirma Tamara Rouse; 13 March 1980 (age 46); Curaçao, Netherlands Antilles
- Genres: Soul; jazz; gospel
- Website: shirmarouse.com

Shirma Tamara Rouse (born 13 March 1980) is a Dutch singer. She is known for her participation in the fourth season of The Voice of Holland, and for providing backing vocals for Anouk at the Eurovision Song Contest 2013. In 2018, she was invited to the funeral of Aretha Franklin, due to the popularity of her tribute album to the artist.

== Biography ==
Shirma Rouse was born on 13 March 1980 on the island of Curaçao, Netherlands Antilles. She grew up on Sint Eustatius and returned to Curaçao in 1996 to complete her secondary education. In 1999, she began studying chemistry at Leiden University in the Netherlands, but transferred to the Rotterdam Conservatory in 2005 to study jazz music.

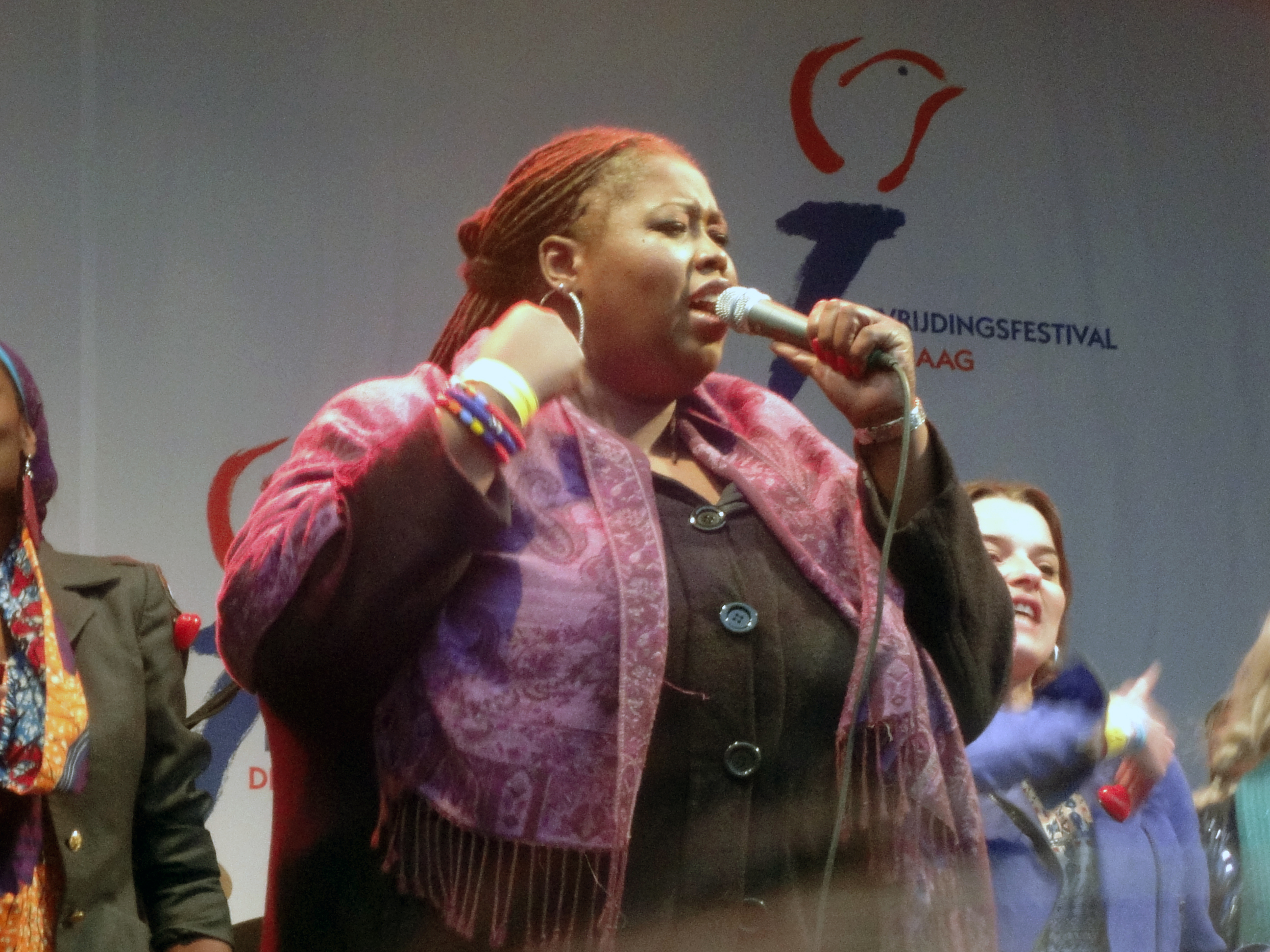
Rouse in 2012

In 2010, Rouse released her debut studio album, titled Chocolate Coated Dreams. In 2012, a second album was released, titled Shirma Rouse sings Aretha, with which she did a theatre tour.

In 2013, she accompanied Anouk to the Eurovision Song Contest in Malmö, Sweden, as a backing singer, where she was named best backing singer by The Eurovision Times. That same year, Rouse participated in the fourth season of The Voice of Holland, where she was eliminated in the semi-finals.

In 2017, Rouse toured with The Soul of Spanish Harlem, and resumed her Aretha Franklin tribute. After the death of Franklin in 2018, Rouse was invited to attend the funeral. In 2021, she published a cookery book in Dutch entitled Shirma's Soul Kitchen. In 2023, she presented an episode of the Omroep Zwart television programme Hoe … is Nederland? about fat shaming.

== Discography ==
=== Studio albums ===
- Chocolate Coated Dreams (2010)
- Shirma Rouse sings Aretha (2012)
- Dedicated to You (2012)
- Shout It Out Loud (2014)
- Soul Serenade (2017)
