= Miracle (Ilse DeLange song) =

Single by Ilse DeLange

from the album Incredible
- B-side: "Miracle (Bride Flight version)"
- Released: 16 January 2009
- Recorded: 2008
- Genre: Pop
- Length: 4:34
- Label: Universal Music Group
- Songwriters: Ilse DeLange, Sacha Skarbek
- Producers: Sacha Skarbek, Peter Ibsen

Ilse DeLange singles chronology
"So Incredible" (2008)	"Miracle" (2009)	"Puzzle Me" (2009)

"Miracle" is a single by Dutch artist Ilse DeLange, from her album Incredible. The song was written by DeLange and Sacha Skarbek and was produced by Skarbek and Peter Ibsen. It is the title-song of the movie Bride Flight. The song won the 2009 Rembrandt Award for best film song. "Miracle" reached the peak position in the Dutch Top 40 and stayed there for two weeks.

== Charts ==
=== Weekly charts ===
Chart (2009)	Peak position
Netherlands (Dutch Top 40)	1
Netherlands (Single Top 100)	2

=== Year-end charts ===
Chart (2009)	Position
Netherlands (Dutch Top 40)	9
Netherlands (Single Top 100)	20

== See also ==
- List of Dutch Top 40 number-one singles of 2009
