= Incredible (Ilse DeLange album) =

Studio album by Ilse DeLange
- Released: 2008

Ilse DeLange chronology
Live (2007)	Incredible (2008)	Live in Ahoy (2009)

Incredible is the fifth studio album of singer songwriter Ilse DeLange.

== Track listing ==
1. Broken Girl
2. Something Amazing
3. Stay With Me
4. Miracle
5. So Incredible
6. We're Alright
7. Adrift
8. Puzzle Me
9. Love Won't Hide
10. Nothing Left to Break
11. The Other Side
12. Fall

== Charts ==
=== Weekly charts ===
Chart (2008–09)	Peak position
Belgian Albums (Ultratop Flanders)	35
Dutch Albums (Album Top 100)	1

=== Year-end charts ===
Chart (2008)	Position
Dutch Albums (Album Top 100)	11
Chart (2009)	Position
Dutch Albums (Album Top 100)	8
Chart (2010)	Position
Dutch Albums (Album Top 100)	90
