= The Great Escape (Ilse DeLange album) =

Studio album by Ilse DeLange
- Released: 15 June 2006
- Recorded: 2005–2006
- Genre: Pop; Country; Rock; Adult contemporary
- Length: 50:09
- Label: Universal Music
- Producer: Patrick Leonard

Ilse DeLange chronology
Clean Up (2003)	The Great Escape (2006)	Live (2007)

Professional ratings
Review scores
Source	Rating
Planet Internet	4.0/5 stars

The Great Escape is the fourth studio album of singer-songwriter Ilse DeLange. The album debuted at number 1 in the Megacharts Album Top 100 in the Netherlands and stayed there for seven weeks.

== Track listing ==
1. Reach For The Light - 04:35
2. The Lonely One - 03:51
3. The Great Escape - 04:01
4. Was It Love - 04:04
5. I Always Will - 05:17
6. Miss Politician - 03:40
7. Don't You Let Go Of Me - 05:05
8. Carry Hope - 04:19
9. Waterfall - 03:51
10. Far Away - 04:22
11. I Love You - 03:52
12. The Valley - 04:16
13. When - 03:57
14. But Beautiful - 03:19 (International bonus track)

== Chart performance ==
The album debuted at #1 in the Netherlands and stayed there for 7 weeks in a row. The Great Escape has never left the top 20 since its release and spent 16 weeks in the top 10 and 37 weeks in the top 20. The album was certified Platinum in August and double Platinum in December 2006.

Albums

Year	Peak chart positions
Year	Dutch
2006	1

=== Singles ===
Year	Title	Peak chart positions	
Year	Title	NL Top 40	NL Top 100
2006	The Great Escape	11	11
2006	The Lonely One	18	12
2007	I Love You	26	35
2007	Reach For The Light	tip11	-
