= Ilse DeLange =

Dutch country and pop singer

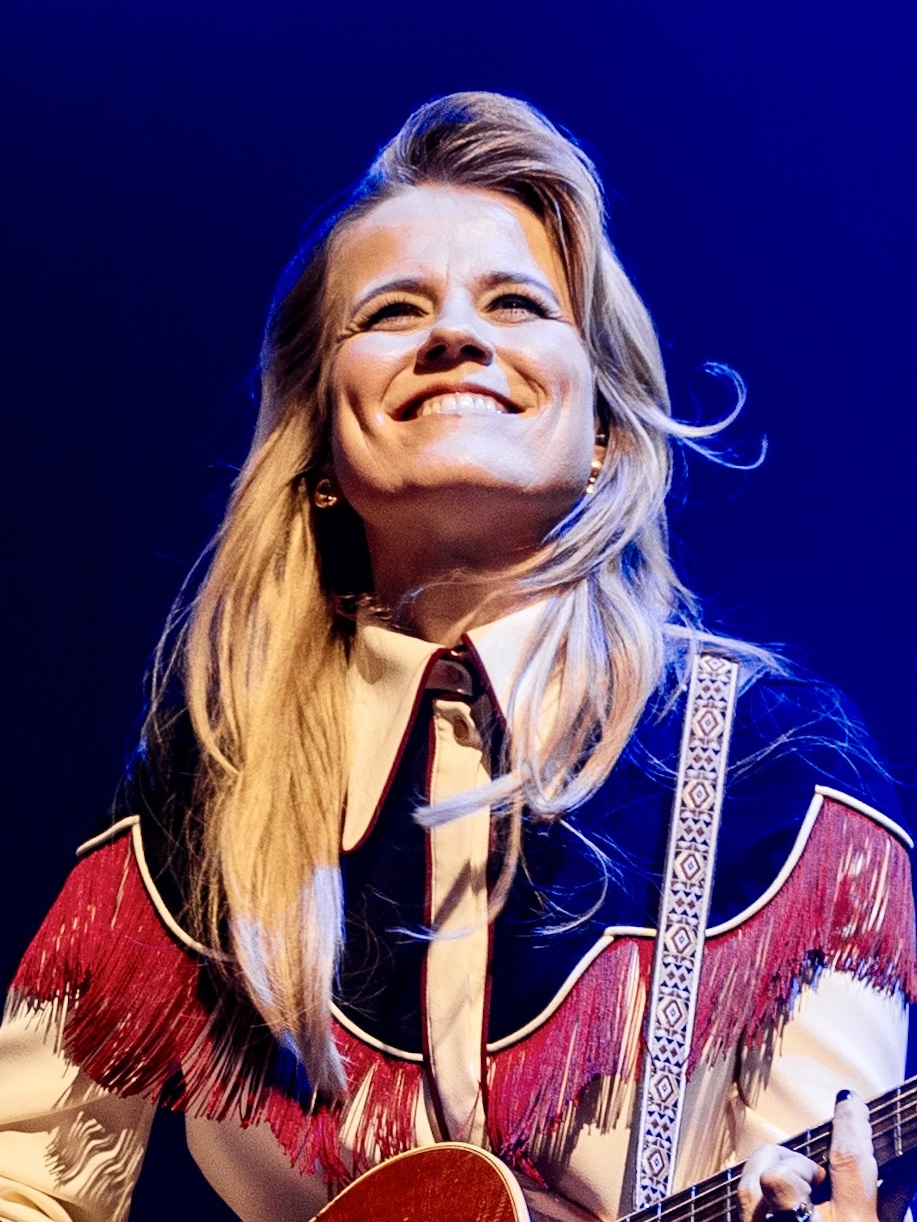
- DeLange in 2025

Background information
- Born: Ilse Annoeska de Lange; 13 May 1977 (age 49); Almelo, The Netherlands
- Genres: Country, pop, pop rock, Dutch pop, Americana
- Occupations: Singer, songwriter
- Instruments: Guitar, vocals
- Years active: 1995–present
- Labels: Warner, Universal, Spark
- Member of: The Common Linnets
- Website: ilsedelange.com

Ilse Annoeska de Lange (born 13 May 1977), better known as Ilse DeLange, is a Dutch country and pop rock singer-songwriter. In 1998, she gained fame with her single 'I'm Not So Tough', which later became multiple platinum in The Netherlands. Other hits were "Miracle", "So Incredible" and "The Great Escape".

As the lead singer of The Common Linnets, she finished in second place at the Eurovision Song Contest 2014. In 2019, DeLange presented Duncan Laurence as the Dutch entry for the Eurovision Song Contest 2019. She also directed and mentored Laurence's act, resulting in Laurence winning the contest with his song "Arcade".

DeLange has won many awards in her career of which the Jeff Walker Global Country Music Award of the Country Music Association Awards is the most known internationally. She also won several Edison Awards in 1998, 2001, 2004, 2009, 2011, 2015, 2019 and 2020.

== Biography ==
Ilse Annoeska de Lange was born on 13 May 1977 in Almelo, Netherlands. She started her career at the age of 8 as a lip-synching artist, which won her several contests. DeLange drew greater attention after switching to a live repertoire in both regional and national talent shows in Hilversum, the city where most Dutch TV-programs are recorded. This helped her book some live-performances on national television. She formed a duo with guitarist Joop van Liefland, who introduced her to country music. In the spring of 1994 Ilse took part in the annual SCPO talent show in Oss. There she performed together with guitarist Joop van Liefland and won in the solo artist category. The SCPO's permanent jury team included musicians-music journalists John Smulders and Henk Korsten (Country Gazette).

In 1994, DeLange performed at the Dutch Country Music Awards. Despite positive reviews, nothing happened with her career. She did get in touch with representatives of Warner Music but it took several years of negotiation before they decided to offer her a contract. That same year, she participated in the "Zangfestival der Onbekenden" ("Song Contest of the Unknown") in the Dutch city of Eindhoven. With her interpretation of Daddy's Hands by Holly Dunn and The Song Remembers When by Trisha Yearwood, she won the contest and got the opportunity to record a demo. In 1996, DeLange drew the attention from the A&R-manager of Dutch record company BMI Music, Henkjan Smits. He persuaded her to join the occasional popgroup Wij and they released the single "De Oorlog Meegemaakt" ("Experienced The War"). However the single did not chart the Dutch Top 40.

=== 1998–1999 ===
==== Breakthrough with World of Hurt ====
In 1998 while being a member of the group Cash On Delivery, she traveled to Nashville, US to record her debut album World of Hurt with top producer Barry Beckett. She became well known in the Netherlands, because her album was recorded in the capital of country music. Partly because of that, her debut single I'm Not So Tough charted and peaked at No. 35 in the Dutch Top 40. Her album received big success in her home country, going 5× Platinum. In the Netherlands, Ilse received a TMF Award and an Edison Award for her musical success in 1999. Although the album was a huge success, next singles World of Hurt, I'd Be Yours and When We Don't Talk didn't chart. Unfortunately World of Hurt wasn't released in the States, despite some interest due to guest vocals from Vince Gill, and Ilse's cover of Beth Nielsen Chapman's song World of Hurt, and Patty Larkin's song Lonely Too.

==== Dear John ====
A year after DeLange released live-album Dear John, an album full of covers by John Hiatt, after a very successful performance at the "Marlboro Flashbacks". Tobacco brand Marlboro organised the tour in a manner of promotion and asked famous Dutch singers to cover their favourite artist. She even went on a mini-tour in support of the album, which lasted several months during 1999. The album went platinum in the Netherlands (with sales of 80,000 copies).

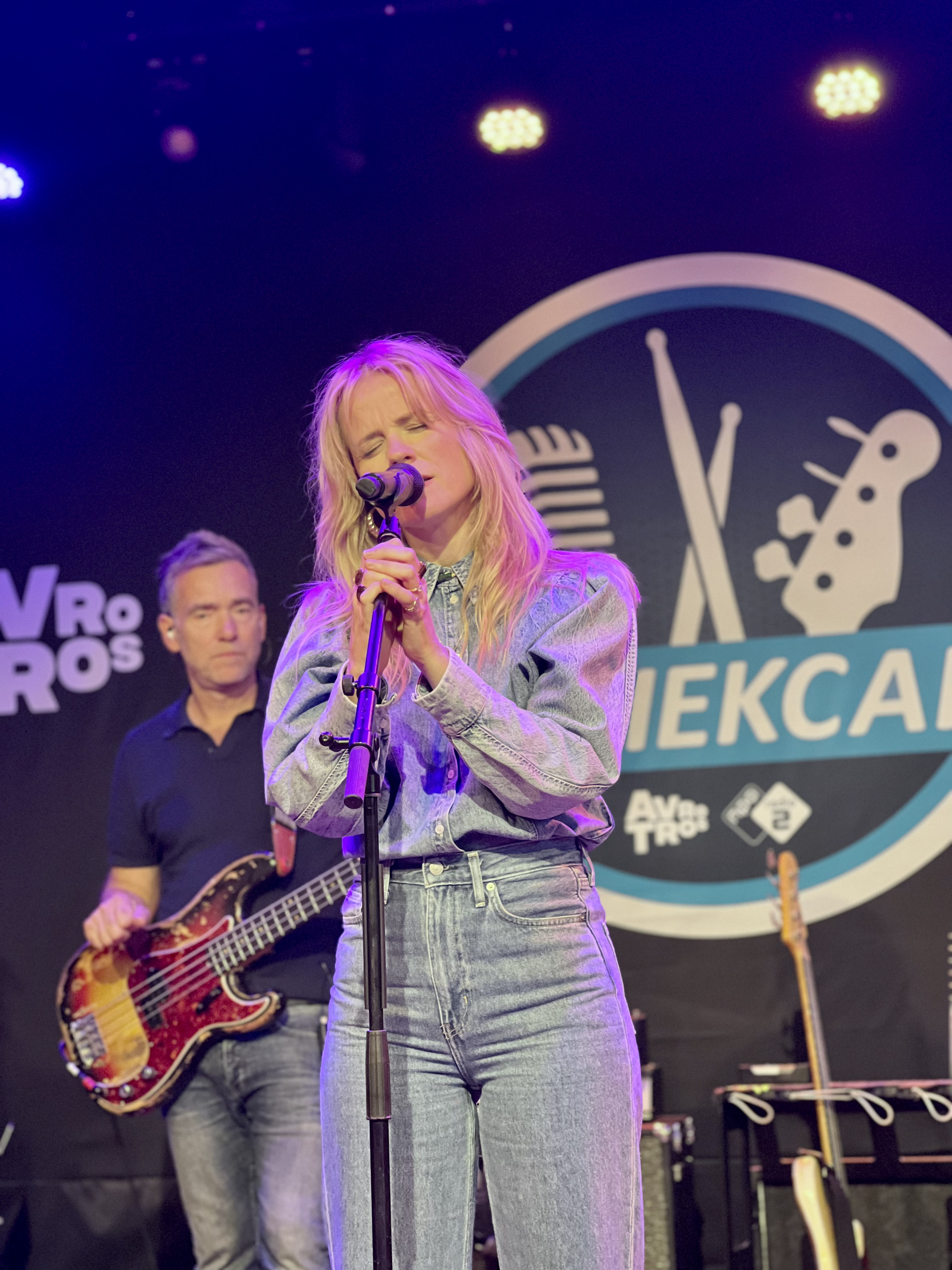
Ilse DeLange during the recordings of het muziekcafé, created by NPO Radio 2 in 2022

=== 2000–2002 ===
==== Livin' on Love and fatigue ====
Rumours of a new album were heard mid-2000. The first single of the album, Livin' on Love (written by Craig Fuller and Gary Nicholson), was released in October and peaked at No. 37 in the Dutch Top 40. November saw the release of her sophomore studio album Livin' on Love, which was a musical departure from her debut, leaning more toward pop/rock. The country music-scene wasn't as excited by this album. Although there was a good amount of promotion for the album, it could not compete with the success of World of Hurt, hitting its peak at No. 5 but still going platinum. Second single I Still Cry didn't chart. In 2001 DeLange started her Livin' on Love Tour, performing in many theaters and concert halls throughout her home country.

Meanwhile, Warner Music attempted to promote this release as her "breakthrough" release in the United States. Although "World Of Hurt" was planned to be released in the States, the record labels in America thought the album was too old-fashioned for the zero's. Ilse set her hopes on the release of "Livin' on Love", but once again the album was not released for unknown reasons. There were rumours that the American label didn't like the pop/rock-sound of the album. Due to all the business problems and a heavy tour schedule, DeLange became physically exhausted. During a performance in Paradiso, (Amsterdam), she experienced vocal problems and emotionally told her fans that she couldn't continue the performance. On doctor's advice she took a few weeks rest.

=== 2003–2007 ===
==== Clean Up and small decline in success ====
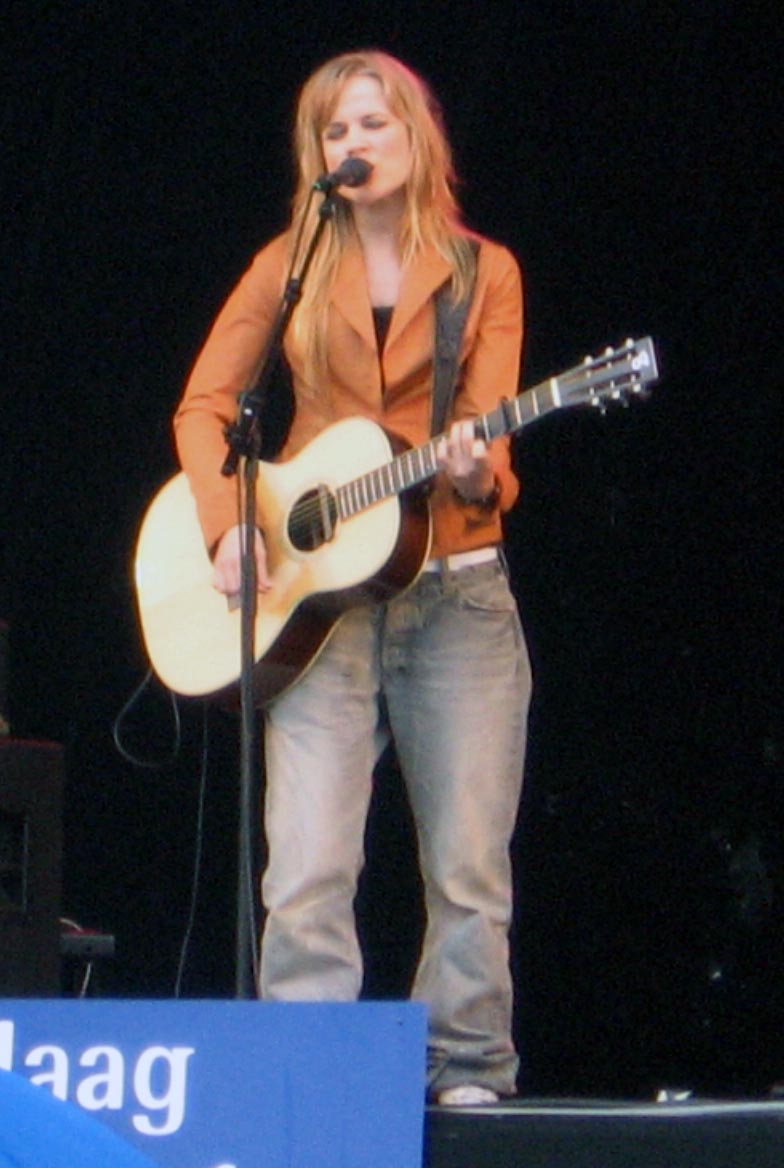
Ilse DeLange at Parkpop in 2006

In 2002, DeLange and her partner Bart Vergoossen, who is the drummer of her live band, went to America for nine months to work on a new album. During the recording sessions DeLange took a greater creative role in her music, including receiving songwriting credit for the entire album. Her writing on was autobiographical. In April 2003 she released Clean Up, her third studio album. This album continued with the pop/rock-sound she experimented with on Livin' on Love. The album debuted at No. 1 in the charts and got certified gold. Despite the success, the first single No Reason To Be Shy was a commercial failure and the record company decided not to release any further singles, but rather focus on a compilation album. This album was released in October of that same year and was called Here I Am. The album spawned two singles, Wouldn't That Be Something and All The Answers, which both were a commercial failure.

==== Search for new record company ====
At the beginning of 2004, the Dutch section of record company Warner Music was disbanded and Ilse lost her contract. A few months later, she collaborated on the song Blue with Italian singer Zucchero. The song was a moderate success in the Netherlands, reaching No. 23 in the Dutch Top 40. There was no information about a new record deal, but Ilse stated that she was working on her future.

In the end of 2005 she went on tour, without releasing a new album or even having a record company. Every concert sold out. She began working with producer Patrick Leonard on a new album, which helped with signing a new record deal. Later that year, it was confirmed Ilse signed a new contract with Universal Music.

==== The Great Escape ====
Her first release on the new label was the single The Great Escape, peaking at No. 11 in the Dutch Top 40. Her fourth studio album The Great Escape, was released on 16 June 2006. It went gold only a week after its release and went 2× Platinum only months later. In September, the second single The Lonely One was released, which peaked at No. 12 in the Single Top 100. The third single, I Love You, was released in February 2007 and peaked at No. 23 in the Dutch Top 40. The song was included on the soundtrack for the Dutch movie adaptation of Steel Magnolias. Then the song Reach for the Light was released as a promo-only single, nevertheless it charted at No. 51. In October 2007, she released a live album, simply called Live.

=== 2008–2010 ===
==== Incredible ====
In 2008 Ilse stated she was writing and recording a new album in the Swedish city of Gothenburg. Before that, she went to England to work with the same songwriters which were working on the debut album of James Morrison. The first single of her forthcoming album was So Incredible, which peaked at No. 6. The album Incredible was released at 17 October 2008 and went platinum in less than a month. It eventually got 5× Platinum. Her next single Miracle came to be her biggest hit to date, reaching the top spot of the Dutch Top 40. It was written as the title track for the Dutch movie Bride Flight. Third single Puzzle Me peaked at No. 5 and radio-only release We're Alright peaked at No. 21, in spite of it not being released as a single.

==== Next to Me EP ====
After releasing another live album, Ilse started working on new material. The single Next To Me was released in July 2010 and reached a #9-spot. Her first EP Next To Me, was released at 27 August 2010. The album only included eight tracks, Ilse explaining that "...she wanted to release new material more often, but due to a heavy touring schedule and contractual obligations didn't have the time to record a whole album". Second single Beautiful Distraction charted at No. 18 and third single Carousel peaked at No. 32. In early 2011, Next To Me has been certified 2× Platinum.

=== 2011–2012 ===
==== Shelved album ====
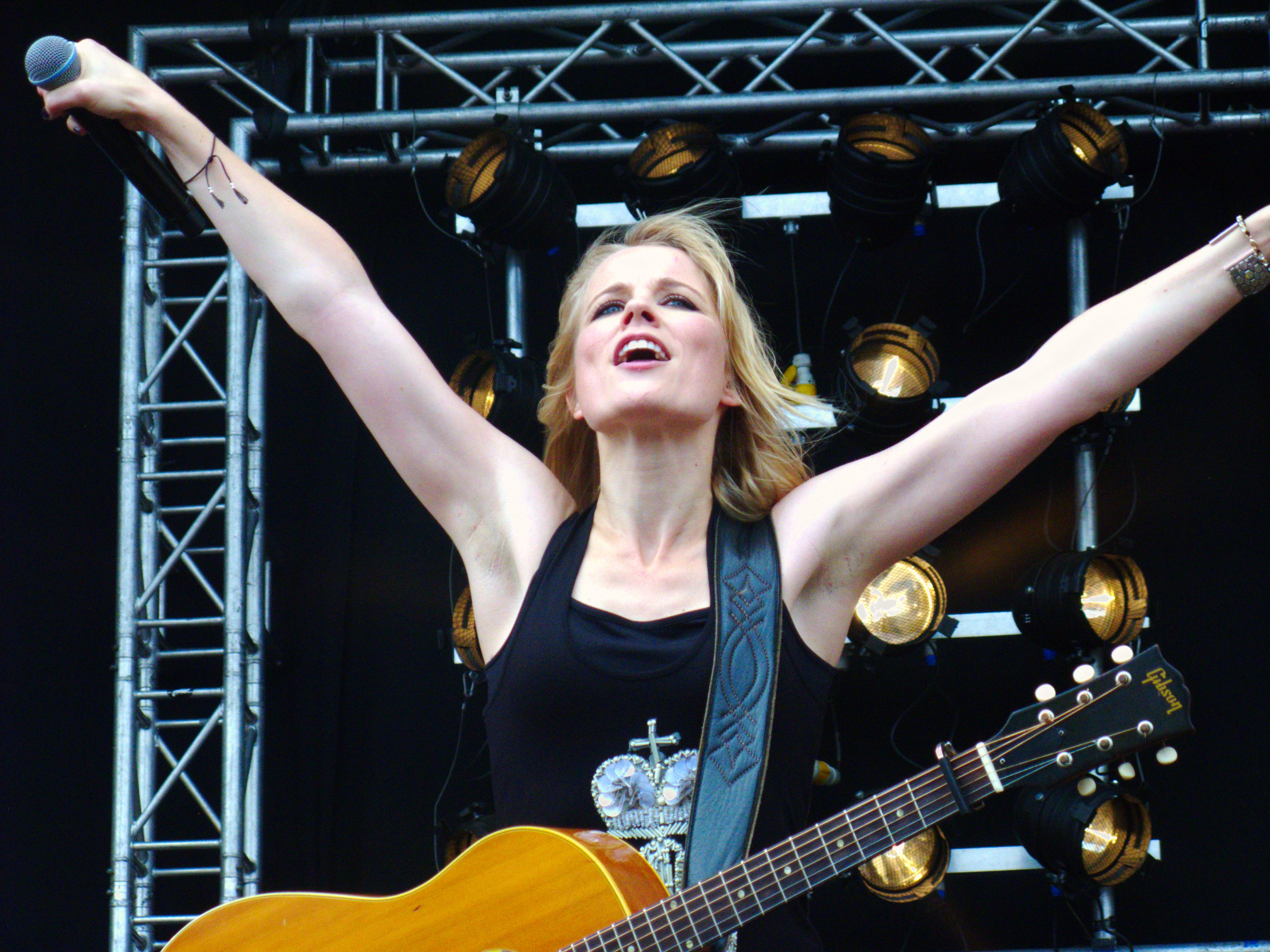
Ilse DeLange at the Zwarte Cross Festival 2011

In November 2011 DeLange released her new single DoLuv2LuvU. The song was the theme song of Serious Request 2011, a big charity-event held yearly by Dutch radio station 3FM. While promoting the single, DeLange heard her father was incurably ill. She immediately stopped all kinds of promotion and postponed the recording process of her new album DoLuv2LuvU. Though the song wasn't promoted, it still charted at No. 14. A day after her father's death, on 10 January 2012, she posted an acoustic version of her song Without You on Twitter, which featured on her 2007 live album. Later that year, Ilse revealed that the DoLuv2LuvU-album was shelved and she started recording a new album. This is because she didn't feel the flow of the album anymore after her father had died. She doesn't rule out the possibility it's going to be released in the future.

==== Eye of the Hurricane ====
In June 2012, the first single from her second album, Hurricane was released. It charted at No. 23 in the Dutch Top 40. Her seventh album Eye of the Hurricane, was released 14 September 2012 and got Platinum in only a few weeks. Second single Winter of Love rose to No. 20 and third single We Are One got to No. 33. This new album got celebrated with a concert in the 'GelreDome' stadium. Originally, the concert was planned for March 2012, but got postponed due to DeLange's father's sickness.

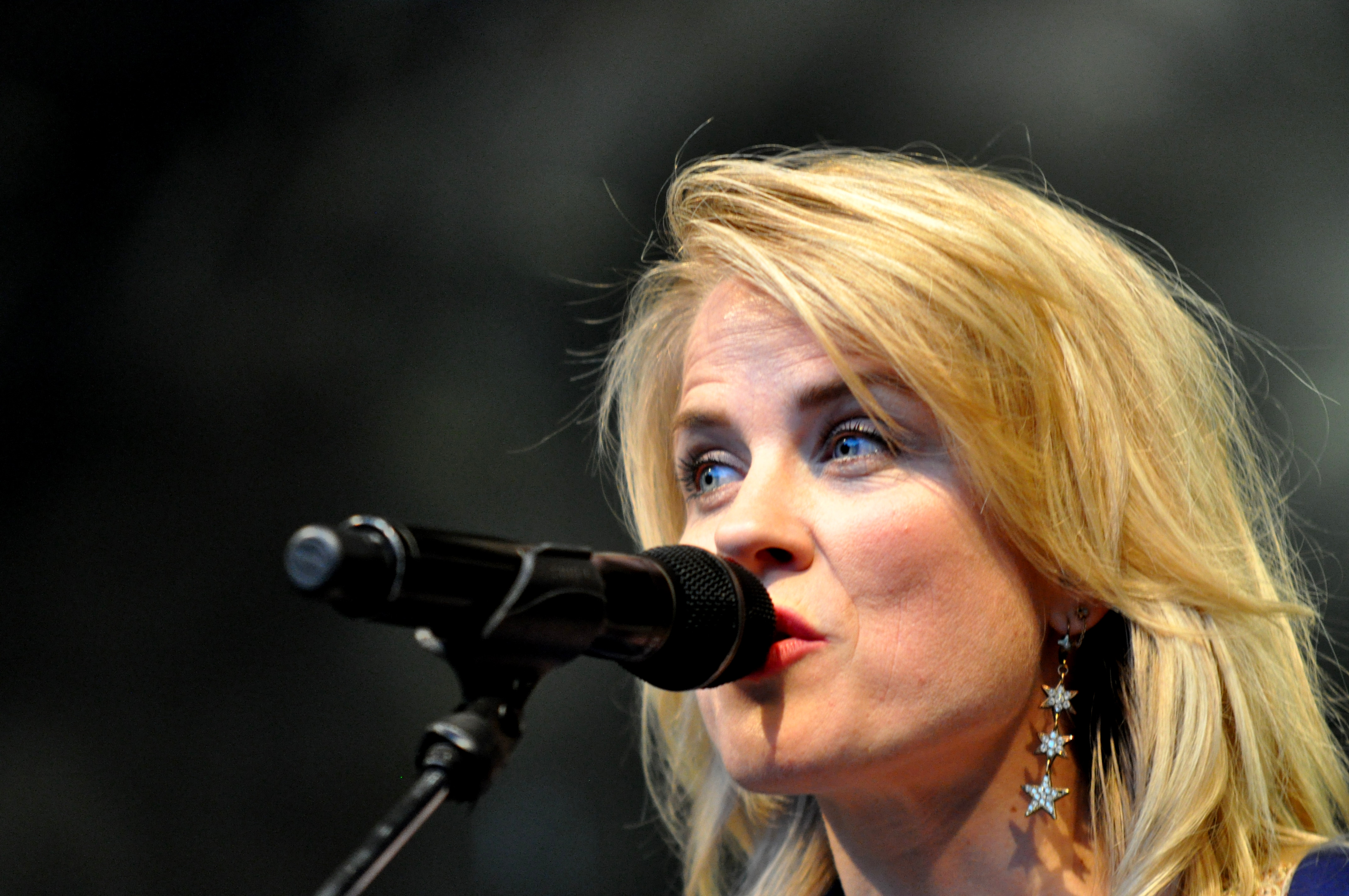
Ilse DeLange in 2017

=== 2013–2018 ===
==== The Voice ====
In 2013, DeLange replaced Nick & Simon as a coach on The Voice of Holland for its fourth season alongside Marco Borsato, Trijntje Oosterhuis and Ali B (who replaced Roel van Velzen). When the live shows started, DeLange released her second compilation album, called After The Hurricane. The first single Blue Bittersweet was written as a soundtrack for the Dutch movie "Het Diner" ("Dinner") and charted to No. 8.

She returned to The Voice of Holland as a coach for its fifth season in August 2014. On 15 January 2015, it was announced that DeLange would be replaced as a coach for the sixth season of The Voice of Holland by Miss Montreal lead singer Sanne Hans. DeLange decided she wanted to spend more time on her international career with The Common Linnets. However, she was announced as the new coach for the fifth season of The Voice Kids, replacing Angela Groothuizen. DeLange's team won in 2016 with Esmée Scheurs. In 2018 and 2019, DeLange also has been a coach for The Voice Senior. In the 2019 season, DeLange's team won the show with singer Ruud Hermans. In 2015, DeLange collaborated and toured with Giant Sand.

==== The Common Linnets ====
DeLange represented the Netherlands, with singer Waylon as The Common Linnets, during the Eurovision Song Contest 2014 in Copenhagen, Denmark. DeLange was also previously asked to participate, only always declined due to the bad Dutch reputation of the show. After singer Anouk participated in 2013 and finished 9th, DeLange changed her opinion. With the song Calm After The Storm the band took second place, only behind the winner Conchita Wurst from Austria.

The song became a hit in fourteen European countries with being a top 10 song in among others Belgium, Germany, Switzerland, Austria, Spain, Denmark and the United Kingdom. The band their debut album became just as their single very successful. The album, released just two days before the finale, sold 50.000 copies within a week in The Netherlands alone. After two months the album received triple platina, selling more than 150 thousand copies worldwide. As result of their success the band toured through Europe twice. They visited London, Vienna, several German and Dutch Cities. They also performed in the United States.

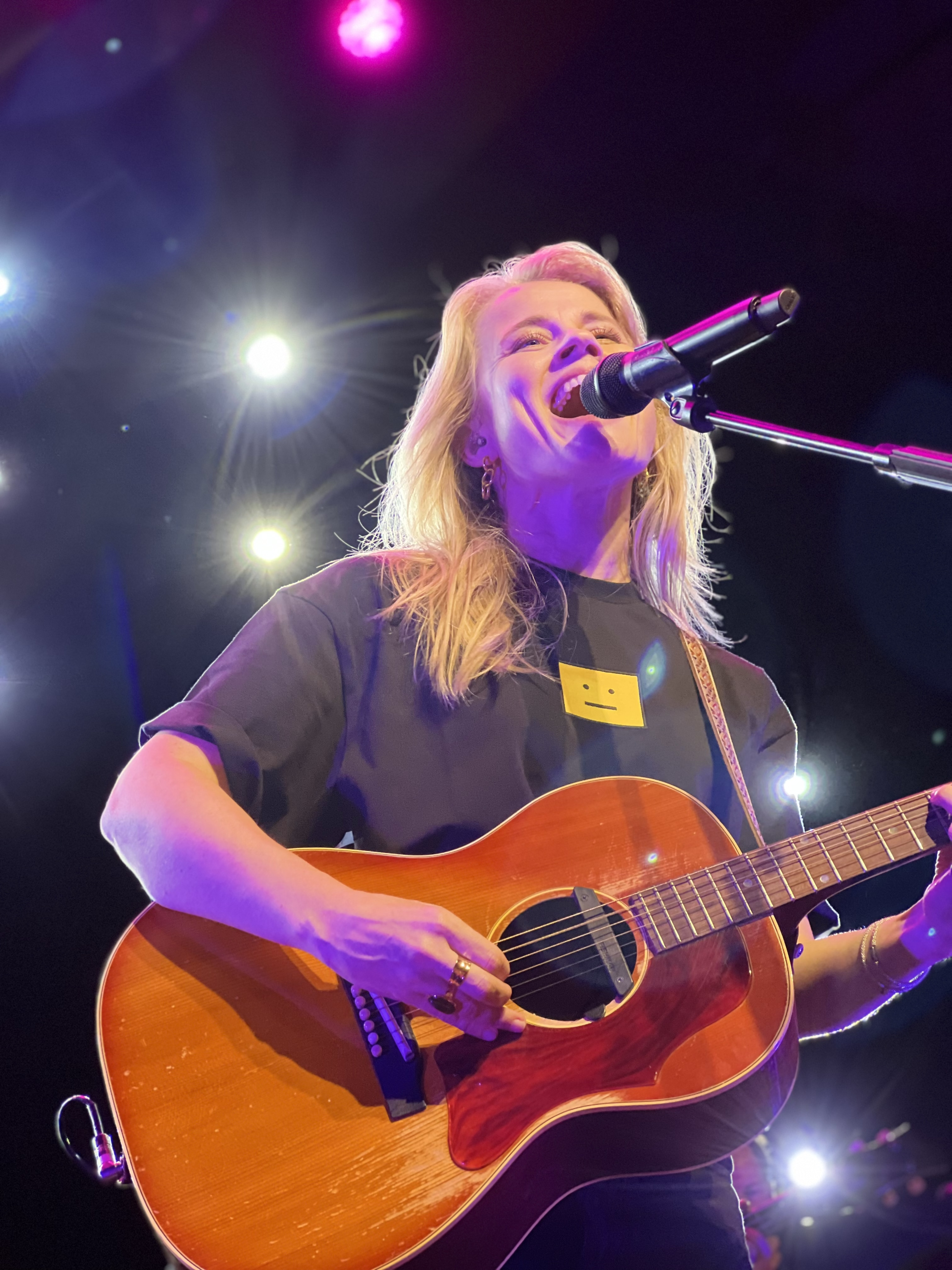
Ilse DeLange during her 2021 clubtour in The Hague.

==== Tuckerville ====
Due to the success of The Common Linnets, DeLange was able to set up a country festival in The Netherlands. An idea she had for over two years. The festival got named 'Tuckerville' (a Tucker is someone from Twente, DeLanges home region). In 2014, the first edition of the festival took place in De Grolsch Veste in Enschede in the region Twente. Almost 30.000 people visited the festival. This was the last time The Common Linnets performed in official setting. After this show parted Waylon with the band. Other artists that performed were De Dijk, Daniël Lohues and Tim Knol.

The second edition took place in 2017 and relocated to 'Het Rutbeek' in Enschede. The original location could not host the festival due to financial problems. In Het Rutbeek was it possible to create multiple stages. One of the stages is in a huge barn, specially build for this festival. This edition got visited by more than 12.500 people. Triggerfinger, Amy Macdonald, The Common Linnets, Racoon and Douwe Bob performed. For the third edition got DeLange countrysinger Carrie Underwood to perform. This was her first concert in The Netherlands. DeLange also performed, her first solo performance since 2014. Since 2017 Tuckerville is an annual festival, with exceptions of the Covid years.

==== Nashville ====
On 7 December 2017 it was revealed that DeLange would have a recurring role in the final season of the ABC/CMT musical-drama series Nashville. In the sixth season of the series, DeLange plays the part of coach 'Ilse DeWitt' quite similar to her job as coach in 'The Voice' franchise. She takes part in a total of six episodes. During the show, DeLange got the opportunity to perform her song Love Goes On, which also got added to the season's music album. The episodes were broadcast in 2018.

==== Spark Records ====
In 2018 created DeLange her own record label, Spark Records, as part of Firefly/Universal Music. She connects artists she wants to give a place in the music industry. Artists signed to her label include The Common Linnets' member Matthew Crosby, Joe Buck, Hannah Mae, Anique van Buseck, Jana Mila, and previously Duncan Laurence. DeLange lets her 'talents' play during her concerts and at Tuckerville.

==== Self-titled album ====
After 5 years DeLange released a pop single for her solo career. The single 'OK' is DeLanges response to fans letters saying that 'Everything is OK' and things will be alright. The single was the leading single for her new album: 'Ilse DeLange'. Together with Tofer Brown she wrote and produced the album. Other singles released of this album were 'Lay Your Weapons Down' and 'Half The Love'. Two music videos were released, for the songs 'OK' and 'Lay Your Weapons Down'. The album received Gold.

=== 2019–present ===
==== Eurovision Song Contest 2019 ====
DeLange was part of the Dutch delegation for the Eurovision Song Contest 2019 as an artistic consultant and mentor to the Dutch representative Duncan Laurence, whom she coached during the fifth season of The Voice of Holland. Laurence went on to win the contest with his song "Arcade". In late 2020, "Arcade" went viral on TikTok, and became the most-streamed Eurovision song on Spotify and charted on the US Billboard Hot 100 the following year.

==== Gravel & Dust ====
In September 2019 DeLange released the roots-album Gravel & Dust. Recorded in Nashville, this album was made with producer T Bone Burnett and has a roots and americana sound. For this album the singer received an Edison Award. The release of the album was accompanied by a tour with 27 shows all over the Netherlands.

==== Breakthrough in Germany with Changes ====
In January 2020, DeLange started working with German songwriters and producers for her new pop album 'Changes'. This album got released just eight months after Gravel & Dust. The titlesong got also released in Germany and became a hit. The song was also used as titlesong for the German version of Farmer Wants a Wife. The song got its own music video, where scenes recorded at Tuckerville were used. In May got the album released. In August got the second single 'Way Back Home' released. Other songs on the album were the duet 'Wrong Direction' with German singer Michael Schulte. To promote her song 'Homesick', DeLange performs that song during the recordings of 'Sing Meinen Song' where she participated in. The long anticipated clubtour finally took place in 2021, after it was rescheduled in 2020 due to the COVID virus.

==== Sing Meinen Song - Das Tauschkonzert ====
DeLange participated in the seventh season of Sing Meinen Song - Das Tauschkonzert. This German television show is based on the Dutch version Beste Zangers. In this program multiple artists are invited to a tropical location, where they will perform covers of the other artists songs. DeLange participated with LEA, Nico Santos, MoTrip, Michael Patrick Kelly, Max Giesinger and Jan Plewka. The show was filmed in South Africa. In every episode there is one central guest. The other artists will in this episode cover the songs of the central guest and the central guest will perform a song that is important for him/her. The episode where DeLange was the central guest, suddenly increased the sales of DeLanges old albums and singles. Her album Changes was the first in her solo career that reached the German albumcharts.

In December 2022 finally took the arena tour of Sing Meinen Song place. This tour got postponed twice, being originally planned for 2020. More than 80,000 people saw DeLange perform with the other artists. The success of the shows lead to DeLange having a clubtour through Germany in 2023.

==== Let's Dance ====
In 2021, DeLange took part in the fourteenth season of the German dance competition series Let's Dance, following in the footsteps of fellow Dutch candidates Loiza Lamers, Sylvie Meis, Marijke Amado and Bastiaan Ragas. However, she withdrew from the competition on 3 May, citing a foot injury as her reason for withdrawal.

==== Eurovision Song Contest 2024 ====
DeLange was one of the five finalists in the Dutch internal selection for the Eurovision Song Contest 2024, where Joost Klein was ultimately chosen.

==== Return to The Voice of Holland ====
On 31 March 2025, it was announced that DeLange would return as a coach for the thirteenth season of The Voice of Holland, following an eight-season hiatus. The season began airing in January 2026. At the same time, it was announced that DeLange would return as a coach on the eleventh season of The Voice Kids.

== Discography ==
- World of Hurt (1998)
- Dear John, (1999)
- Livin' on Love (2000)
- Clean Up (2003)
- The Great Escape (2006)
- Incredible (2008)
- Next to Me (2010)
- Eye of the Hurricane (2012)
- The Common Linnets (2014) (as part of the Common Linnets)
- II (2015) (as part of the Common Linnets)
- Ilse DeLange (2018)
- Gravel & Dust (2019)
- Changes (2020)
- Tainted (2024)

== Awards ==
Year	Category	Genre	Recording
Country Music Association Awards
2020	Jeff Walker Global Achievement Award	Country	N/A
TMF Awards
1999	Best New Artist	General	N/A
2006	Best Album	Pop	The Great Escape
Edison Awards
1998	Best Female Singer	Pop	World of Hurt
2001	Best Artist of The Year	Pop	Livin' on Love
2001	Best Female Singer	Pop	Livin' on Love
2004	Best Female Singer	Pop	Clean Up (nl:Clean Up)
2009	Best Female Singer	Pop	Incredible
3FM Awards
2009	Best Song	Pop	Incredible
2009	Best Album	Pop	Incredible
2009	Best Female Singer	Pop	Incredible
2010	Best Artist	Pop	Incredible
2013	Best Female Singer	Pop	

Awards and achievements
Preceded by Anouk with "Birds"	Netherlands in the Eurovision Song Contest (as part of The Common Linnets); 2014	Succeeded by Trijntje Oosterhuis with "Walk Along"
