= Next to Me (album) =

Studio album by Ilse DeLange
- Released: 2010
- Label: Universal

Ilse DeLange chronology
| Live in Ahoy (2009) | Next to Me (2010) | Live in Gelredome (2011) |

Next to Me is the sixth studio album by Dutch singer-songwriter Ilse DeLange.

== Track listing ==
1. "Next to Me"
2. "Eyes Straight Ahead"
3. "Almost"
4. "Beautiful Distraction"
5. "Carousel"
6. "Untouchable"
7. "Time Out"
8. "Paper Plane"

== Charts ==
=== Weekly charts ===
| Chart (2010) | Peak position |
|---|---|
| Belgian Albums (Ultratop Flanders) | 46 |
| Dutch Albums (Album Top 100) | 1 |

=== Year-end charts ===
| Chart (2010) | Position |
|---|---|
| Dutch Albums (Album Top 100) | 12 |
| Chart (2011) | Position |
| Dutch Albums (Album Top 100) | 50 |
