= Sitting by the Riverside =

Song by the Kinks

from the album The Kinks Are the Village Green Preservation Society
- Released: 22 November 1968
- Recorded: July 1968
- Studio: Pye, London
- Genre: Psychedelia
- Length: 2:21
- Label: Pye
- Songwriter: Ray Davies
- Producer: Ray Davies

Official audio
- "Sitting by the Riverside" on YouTube

"Sitting by the Riverside" is a song by the English rock band the Kinks from their sixth studio album, The Kinks Are the Village Green Preservation Society (1968). Written and sung by Ray Davies, it was recorded in July 1968. The song features honky-tonk piano and a Mellotron which duplicates the sound of an accordion. An example of psychedelia, the song's relaxed style is offset by the sound of a swelling cacophony between verses, a sound reminiscent of the crescendo in the Beatles' 1967 song "A Day in the Life". The song describes a pleasant experience sitting next to a river and was inspired by Davies's time spent as a child fishing with his father.

== Background and composition ==
Ray Davies was inspired to compose "Sitting by the Riverside" after reminiscing about childhood fishing expeditions with his father. The song's narrator expresses his pleasure at sitting and drinking wine with his partner by the riverside, asking to "please keep me calm, keep me pacified" so he can enjoy the calming effect of the river. Author Johnny Rogan considers the song one of several by Davies about "the beauty of a quiet life", suggesting its mood of "lazy resignation" is reminiscent of "Sunny Afternoon" (1966). Author Rob Jovanovic considers the song, alongside "Animal Farm" and "Village Green", to be one of the most important thematically on The Kinks Are the Village Green Preservation Society, all three of which he thinks convey imagery of simple village life.

"Sitting by the Riverside" is an example of psychedelia. It employs a Vaudeville-like tune and a light piano arrangement. The narrator closing his eyes results in a rush of overwhelming memories and fear, accompanying which is a swelling cacophony. A section of rising dissonance between verses serves to briefly undermine the idyllic mood, before cutting back to the pleasant feeling of the verse.

== Recording and release ==
The crescendo between the verses of "Sitting by the Riverside"
Author Thomas M. Kitts describes the keyboards of the section as "psychedelic swirls and vibrations", and author Christian Matijas-Mecca similarly characterises it as a "Beatlesque-inflected psychedelic wash".

The Kinks recorded "Sitting by the Riverside" in July 1968 in Pye Studio 2, one of two basement studios at Pye Records' London offices. Davies is credited as the song's producer, while Pye's in-house engineer Brian Humphries operated the four-track mixing console. The recording features honky-tonk piano and a Mellotron – a tape-loop-based keyboard instrument – which duplicates the sound of an accordion. The dissonant section between verses features rising piano strings. Its wordless chorus and orchestral crescendo are reminiscent of the Beatles' song "A Day in the Life", something Rogan writes was typical of songs recorded soon after the 1967 release of Sgt. Pepper's Lonely Hearts Club Band.

The Kinks lip-synced "Sitting by the Riverside" for the programme Colour Me Pop on BBC Two's Late Night Line-Up on 22 July 1968. While the studio version of the song was recorded in July 1968, Davies did not include it on the twelve-track edition of The Kinks Are the Village Green Preservation Society, planned for release in September 1968. After he delayed the album's release by two months to expand its track listing to fifteen, it was among the songs he added. Pye released Village Green in the UK on 22 November 1968, sequencing "Sitting by the Riverside" as the final song on side one.

In a retrospective assessment, Morgan Enos of Billboard magazine placed the song second last in a ranking of the album's songs, writing that it rated above "Monica" only because it displayed more thematic relevance to the Village Green concept. By contrast, authors Neville Marten and Jeff Hudson consider it one of the album's most memorable songs, displaying "Davies' voice is at its languid best".
