= Perfect Sound Forever =

Perfect Sound Forever may refer to:

- Perfect Sound Forever (EP), by Pavement, 1991
- Perfect Sound Forever (book), a 2004 biography about Pavement by Rob Jovanovic
- Perfect Sound Forever (magazine), an online music magazine
