= The Kinks Are the Village Green Preservation Society =

1968 studio album by the Kinks

Studio album by the Kinks
- Released: 22 November 1968
- Recorded: February 1967 ("Village Green"); March–October 1968
- Studios: Pye, London
- Genres: Pop; rock; baroque pop; folk-pop
- Length: 39:11
- Label: Pye
- Producer: Ray Davies

The Kinks UK chronology
Live at Kelvin Hall (1968)	The Kinks Are the Village Green Preservation Society (1968)	Arthur (Or the Decline and Fall of the British Empire) (1969)

The Kinks US chronology
Something Else by the Kinks (1968)	The Kinks Are the Village Green Preservation Society (1969)	Then Now and Inbetween (1969)

Alternative cover
- Unreleased UK twelve-track cover, instead issued in Scandinavia on 9 October 1968

Singles from The Kinks Are the Village Green Preservation Society
- 1. "Starstruck" / "Picture Book" Released: January 1969 (US)

The Kinks Are the Village Green Preservation Society is the sixth studio album by the English rock band the Kinks. Released on 22 November 1968, Village Green was a modest seller, but it was lauded by contemporary critics for its songwriting and has subsequently been regarded by commentators as an early concept album. The album was the band's first which failed to chart in either the United Kingdom or United States, and its embrace by America's new underground rock press completed the Kinks' transformation from mid-1960s pop hitmakers to critically favoured cult band.

Ray Davies, the Kinks' frontman, loosely conceptualised the album as a collection of character studies, an idea he based on Dylan Thomas's 1954 radio drama Under Milk Wood. Centring on themes of nostalgia, memory and preservation, the album reflects Davies's concerns about the increasing modernisation and encroaching influence of America and Europe on English society. Musically an example of pop or rock music, the album incorporates a range of stylistic influences, including music hall, folk, blues, psychedelia and calypso. It was the first album which Davies produced on his own and was the last to feature the original Kinks line-up, as bassist Pete Quaife departed the band in March 1969. It also marked the final collaboration between the Kinks and Nicky Hopkins, a session musician whose playing features heavily on piano, harpsichord and Mellotron.

Other than "Village Green", which was recorded in November 1966 and re-recorded in February 1967, the album's sessions ran at London's Pye Studios from roughly March to October 1968. (Note: Original session reels and Pye's 1968 studio documentation generally do not survive, making exact dating of the album's sessions an impossibility. The researchers Doug Hinman and Andrew Sandoval formerly dated the album's sessions from late 1967 to late 1968, but later determined it was "spring to autumn" 1968, or from approximately 5 March to 8 October.) In addition to the non-album singles "Wonderboy" and "Days", the sessions resulted in numerous tracks, some of which went unreleased for years. The album's planned September 1968 release was delayed by two months in the UK after Davies's last-minute decision to rearrange and augment the track listing, but release of the earlier twelve-track edition went ahead in several European countries. The album had no accompanying lead single in the UK, but "Starstruck" was issued in the US and Europe.

Despite its initial commercial shortcomings, Village Green has influenced numerous musical acts, especially American indie artists from the late 1980s and 1990s and Britpop groups including Blur and Oasis. Driven in part by this influence, the album experienced a critical and commercial resurgence in the 1990s, and it has been reissued several times, including an expanded edition in 2018. The album has since become the Kinks' best-selling album in the UK, where the British Phonographic Industry (BPI) certified it silver in 2008 and gold in 2018. It has been included in several critics' and listeners' polls for the best albums of all time, including those published by Rolling Stone magazine and in the book All Time Top 1000 Albums.

== Background ==
In July 1965, the Kinks were informally blacklisted from performing in the United States by the American Federation of Musicians. The circumstances that led to the ban are unclear but likely stemmed from several incidents during the band's first US tour; Ray Davies later attributed it to a combination of "bad luck, bad management, [and] bad behaviour". (Note: On 2 July 1965, while backstage of Dick Clark's show Where the Action Is, Ray fought a member of the American Federation of Television and Radio Artists. Two days later, the Kinks refused to perform a concert in San Francisco after the promoter declined Ray's request that the band be paid in cash. The ban persisted until Ray negotiated its resolution in mid-April 1969.) Despite the Kinks' recent commercial successes, the band's extensive touring and promotional appearances led Ray to a nervous breakdown in March 1966. (Note: Adding to Ray's stresses was litigation by Larry Page, the Kinks' former manager, and Edward Kassner, their former publisher, who had been claiming publishing rights and 10 per cent of the band's earnings since November 1965. Ray's songwriting earnings from November 1965 on remained in escrow during the legal proceedings, which persisted until October 1970.)

I hope England doesn't change. I'm writing a song now called "You Ain't What You Used to Be" which expresses what I feel. I hope we don't get swallowed up by America and Europe. I'm really proud of being British ... I don't care if a bloke votes Labour or Conservative as long as he appreciates what we've got here. We have so much that is great, compared with other countries, and people just don't realise it. I want to keep writing very English songs.

— Ray Davies, April 1966

Following Ray's breakdown, the band reduced their touring commitments and spent more time recording in the studio, a change which allowed Ray to develop as a songwriter while leaving him increasingly separated from the emerging youth and drug cultures. Author Ian MacDonald further suggests that the band's US touring ban left the group comparatively isolated from American influence, guiding them away from their earlier blues-based riffing towards a distinctly English style. In the year that followed, Ray grew obsessed with aspects of English aristocracy and the country's dying traditions. He expressed his pride of Britain in an April 1966 interview with Melody Maker magazine, wishing its culture could remain distinct from that of America and Europe. He further indicated his desire to keep writing "very English songs" and hoped to convey his feelings in a new composition.

According to author Johnny Rogan, The Kinks Are the Village Green Preservation Society (often shortened as Village Green) reflects a progression in the thematic linking apparent on the Kinks' albums. Originally known as a singles act, the band assembled their earliest LPs without thought towards making a larger artistic statement. Their 1964 hit singles "You Really Got Me" and "All Day and All of the Night" focused on simple boy-girl relationships, a format Ray derided on his May 1965 B-side "I Need You". Over the next year, Ray shifted his songwriting approach towards social commentary about contemporary British society, exemplified in the September 1965 song "A Well Respected Man" and February 1966 single "Dedicated Follower of Fashion".

The band's November 1965 album The Kink Kontroversy marked the first time Ray composed songs specifically for a single project, resulting in an LP which the band considered their most unified work to date. Ray further shifted his approach with the band's 1966 album Face to Face, conceptualising an LP made up of songs connected through the use of sound effects and segues. Though Pye Records's objections forced him to reestablish the traditional separation between tracks, retrospective commentators often regard the album as one of rock music's first thematically linked albums, dealing loosely with themes of English class and social structures. Despite these later sentiments, Ray was unsatisfied with Face to Face; in interviews after its release, he disparaged the album as lacking in cohesion.

== Inspiration and conception ==
In November 1966, as the Kinks started sessions for their next album, Something Else by the Kinks, Ray began envisioning an LP unified around his newest composition "Village Green". He considered numerous concepts over time, including writing a piece of musical theatre or pantomime or filming a television special with live bands and an orchestra. The band shelved the idea while they worked on Something Else, deeming it more appropriate for a potential solo album than a Kinks LP. Ray spent the first half of 1967 increasingly thinking about the form his solo project would take; press releases in June announced that his solo LP would be released in September, and magazine articles in July and August reported that the album would be made up of "orchestra and things like that", "ideas and songs" or one with "the songs linked up in a musical story".

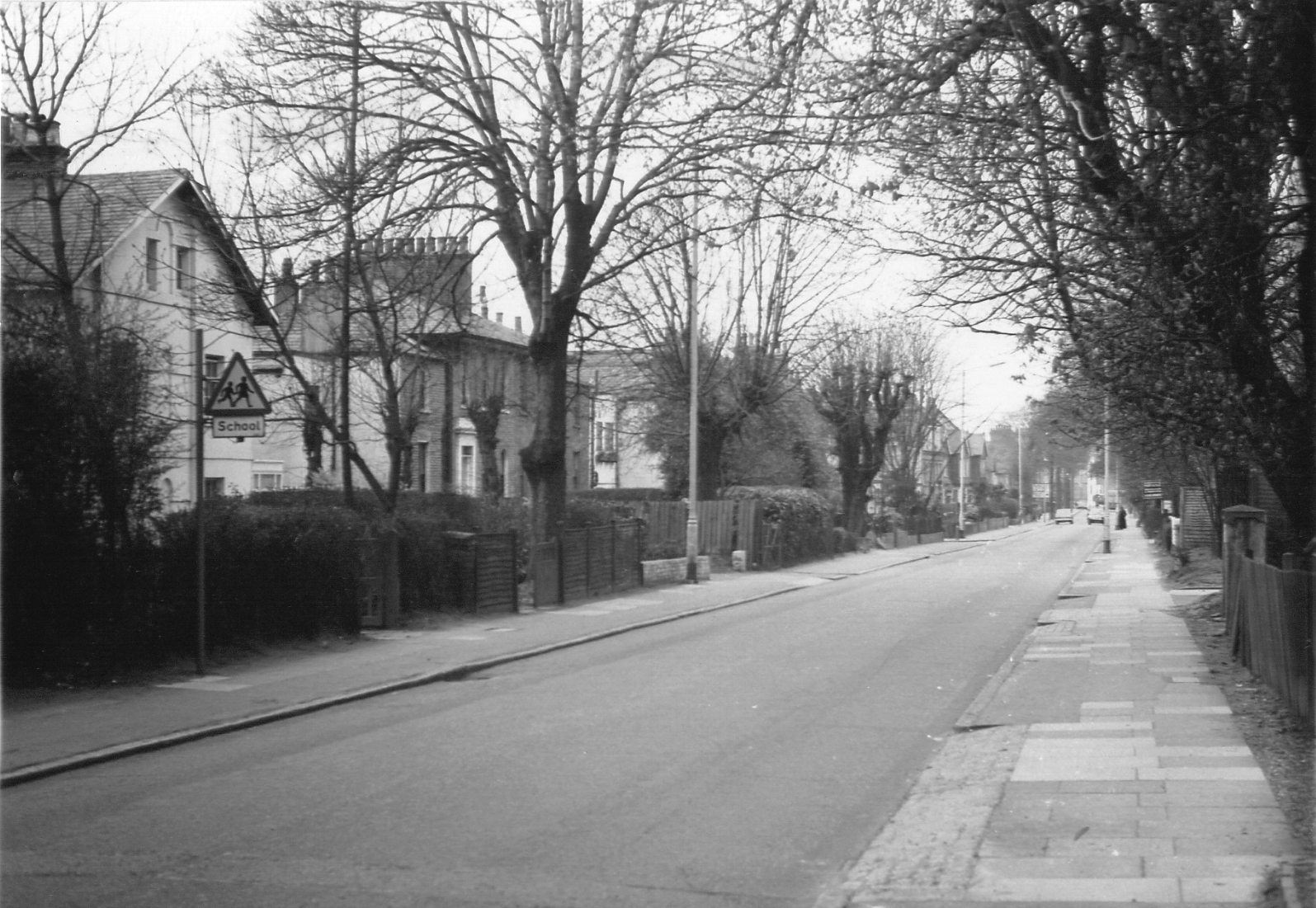
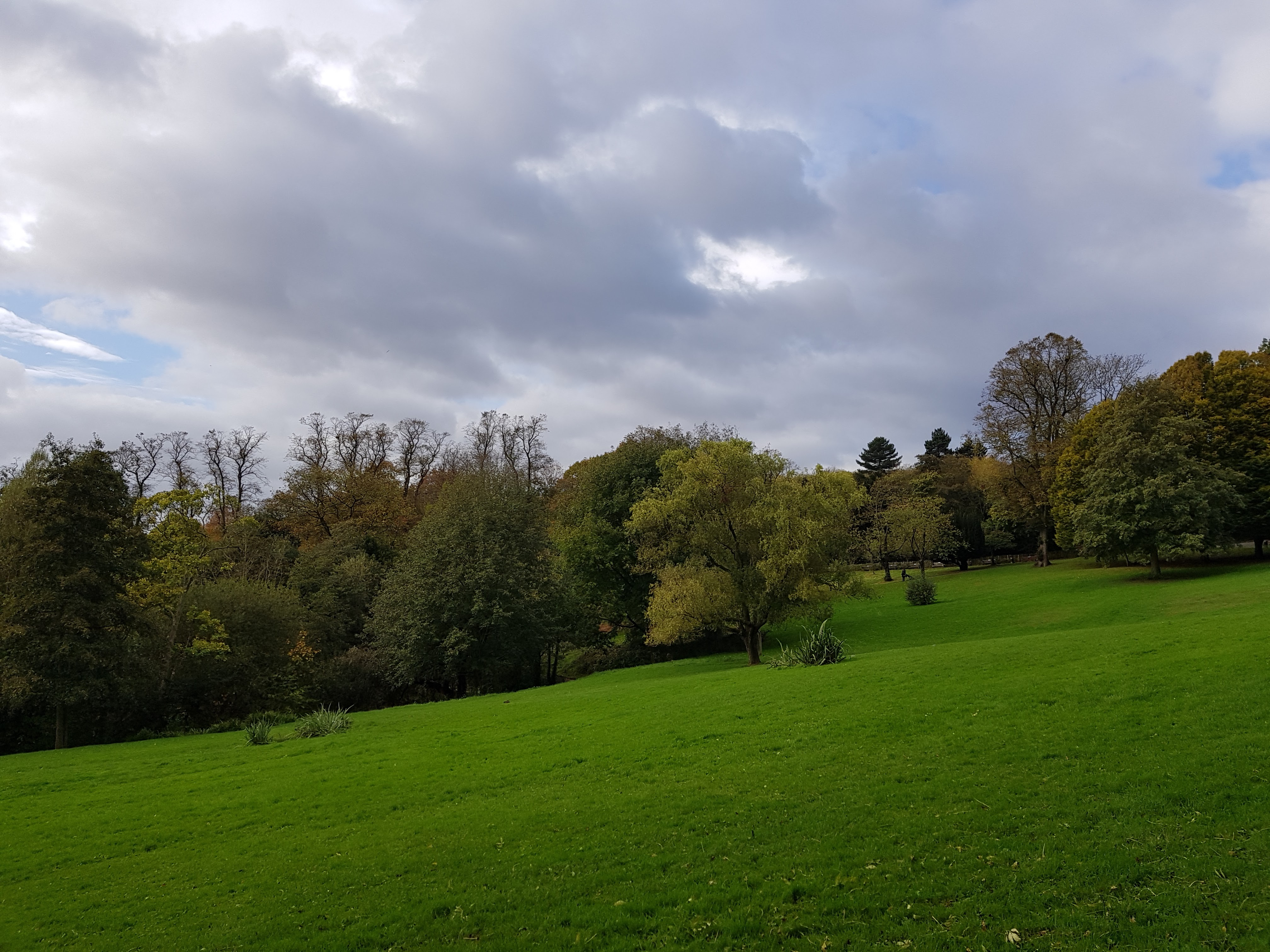
Among the album's inspirations are Ray and Dave Davies's childhood neighbourhood, Fortis Green in North London (pictured left, 1973), and Waterlow Park in the nearby suburb of Highgate (right, 2017), which Ray regularly visited.

In later interviews, Ray has regularly cited the Kinks' five-year ban from American performance as producing his pivot towards English-focused lyrics. Author Andy Miller instead connects Ray's writing to a broader tradition of English pastoral poetry – made up of authors like William Blake, William Wordsworth and Oliver Goldsmith – which often yearned for an idealised past rural England. Academic Carey Fleiner writes that his idealisation of both rural and home life fitted in the revival of the "heritage escapism" trend, which surged across English popular culture following the Second World War. (Note: The original "heritage escapism" trend arose during the Victorian and Edwardian eras, as working-class society reacted against rapid industrialisation and crowded urban environments.) Ray has also discussed his childhood as influencing his lyrics' sentiments towards village life. Both Ray and his brother Dave grew up in Fortis Green, a suburban neighbourhood of Muswell Hill in North London; though the area did not have a traditional village green as a common area, Ray has regularly described the area in rural terms and has compared its atmosphere to that of a village. (Note: Ray has sometimes termed the area "the leafy suburbs". In a 2011 interview, he explained that "North London was my village green, my version of the countryside".) He has also mentioned Waterlow Park in the nearby suburb of Highgate and its small lake as an influence. (Note: In 1966, Highgate residents founded The Highgate Society, which sought to block plans for construction of a major road through the village, a change which organisers argued would "ruin one of the finest rows of houses" anywhere.)

In writing the songs on Village Green, Ray was initially inspired by Dylan Thomas's 1954 radio drama Under Milk Wood, a work which focuses on the townspeople of a small Welsh town on a typical spring day. Miller further connects Ray's writing the works of English author George Orwell. (Note: Miller compares Winston Smith's dreams of the golden country in Orwell's 1949 novel Nineteen Eighty-Four to the album and the larger pastoral tradition, and Ray subsequently compared his notion of the village green as a safe haven to the secret place Smith goes in the novel. The title of the song "Animal Farm" additionally references Orwell's 1945 novella of the same name.) He and other commentators draw particular comparison between Village Green and Orwell's 1939 novel Coming Up for Air, a work which presents a similarly ambivalent view of nostalgia. (Note: Coming Up for Air's protagonist George Bowling goes back to the country town of his childhood and experiences disappointment when comparing it to his nostalgic expectations. Orwell biographer Bernard Crick writes that the novel presents an ambivalent view of nostalgia, and that while "[t]here are so many good things in the past we should preserve ... clinging to the past indiscriminately is no solution.) Journalist and musician Rob Chapman suggests that in addition to Coming Up for Air, Ray's lyrics further allude to other English writings, including Harold Nicolson's short stories, E. M. Forster's Bloomsbury essays and the writings of Philip Larkin. Author Ken Rayes compares the album to the 1925 novel The Great Gatsby by American author F. Scott Fitzgerald, a relationship he thinks is hinted at in the song "Village Green" by the presence of the characters Tom and Daisy, who have the same names as the novel's characters Tom and Daisy Buchanan. Rayes writes that Ray's notion of "an encroaching modern English culture" parallels the novel's motifs of "mythic America and the changing American dream".

== Recording history ==
=== 1966–1967 ===
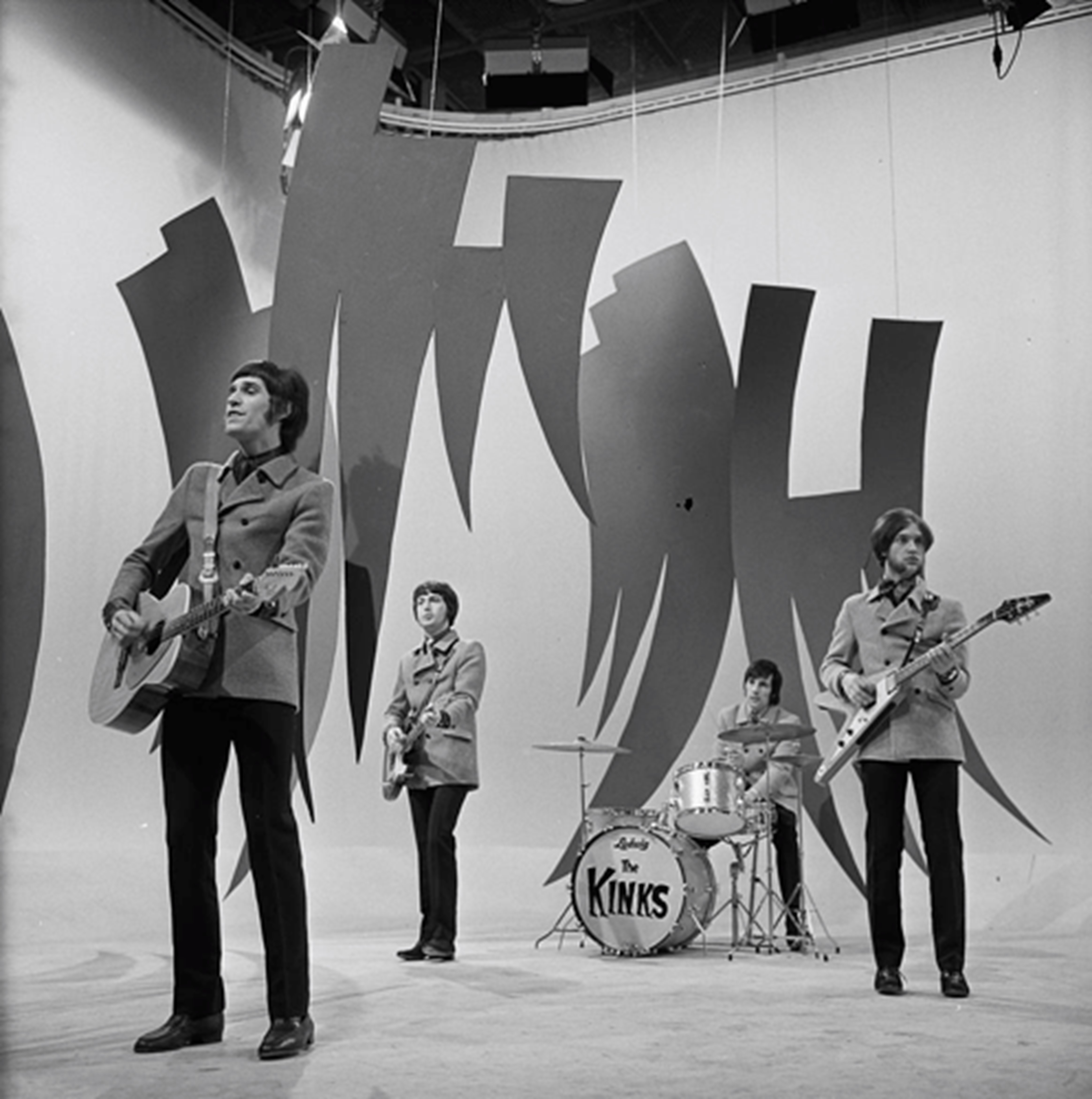
The Kinks performing for Dutch television in April 1967, two months after re-recording "Village Green"

The Kinks first recorded "Village Green" at the beginning of the sessions for Something Else on 24–25 November 1966. They re-recorded the song in February 1967. (Note: Band biographer Rob Jovanovic writes that all the November 1966 recordings, including "Village Green", were "early versions" and demos. Ray and Hinman both write "Village Green" was re-recorded entirely in February 1967. Miller raises the possibility that the band recorded the basic track in November 1966 and overdubbed additions in February 1967.) Though the song was recorded during the sessions for Something Else, Ray did not include it on that album in September 1967. In November, the Kinks shifted to working on a project tentatively titled Village Green, at that time still envisaged as a Ray solo project. Ray wrote most of Village Green's songs from late 1967 into 1968, though he later suggested that several had been half-finished from years earlier. He generally composed songs on his Fender Malibu acoustic guitar in his living room at 87 Fortis Green, North London.

The band began rehearsing Ray's new songs at his home in late 1967. Around the same time, they stockpiled studio recordings for later use without initially knowing when or in what format they would be released. "Mr. Songbird" and numerous other songs on Village Green may date to around this period. (Note: No paperwork from the Kinks' 1960s recording sessions at Pye Studios survive, forcing later to authors to estimate recording dates from other sources. In Hinman and Brabazon's 1994 discography, they date "Phenomenal Cat" from late 1967 to mid-1968 and "Monica" to spring 1968, while in Hinman's 2004 discography he dates both songs to sometime between late 1967 and May 1968. Archivist Andrew Sandoval instead writes "Sitting by the Riverside", "Starstruck", "Phenomenal Cat" and "All of My Friends Were There" may have been done anytime between late 1967 and mid-1968.) Between late 1967 and early 1968, the Kinks remained generally inactive as a band; Dave spent time promoting his recent solo single "Susannah's Still Alive", and Ray wrote weekly songs for the BBC variety series At the Eleventh Hour between 30 December and 2 March.

=== 1968 ===
==== March–April ====
The Kinks began recording Village Green in earnest in March 1968. Most of the album was recorded in Pye Studio 2, the smaller of two basement studios at Pye's London offices. The band recorded any time they were able to obtain studio time, generally in the late afternoon or in the middle of the night. While Ray produced, Pye's in-house engineers operated the four-track mixing console; the band's longtime engineer Alan "Mac" MacKenzie (Note: Sources vary in their spelling of his last name. Most, including Ray in his autobiography, spell it MacKenzie, while others use Mackenzie or McKenzie. The original liner notes typeset it as MACKENZIE.) worked on the album until departing from Pye in early 1968. Brian Humphries engineered from May onward, beginning with the recording of "Days". (Note: In a 2018 interview, Humphries stated that he mixed the entirety of Village Green, but Hinman writes that Ray did all of its mixing in August and October 1968. Quaife later recalled that Humphries and MacKenzie's contributions only extended to "[making] sure the needles didn't go into the red".)

The band's initial March 1968 sessions produced numerous recordings, only some of which ended up on the final album, including "Animal Farm" and "Johnny Thunder". Other tracks like "Berkeley Mews", "Did You See His Name" and "Rosemary Rose" went unreleased for years. (Note: "Berkeley Mews" was released in the UK as the B-side to the 1970 single "Lola", "Did You See His Name" in 1972 on the US-only compilation album The Kink Kronikles and "Rosemary Rose" in 1973 on another US-only compilation album, The Great Lost Kinks Album.) The band also recorded two songs for Dave's next solo single, "Lincoln County" backed with "There Is No Life Without Love". Pye planned to issue Dave's single in the second week of April at the same time as the Kinks' next single, but the band negotiated with the label to delay the release of Dave's until August.

After being quickly written and recorded earlier in March, "Wonderboy" was selected by Pye from the available recordings to be the band's next single. (Note: Other candidates considered for the single appear on surviving acetate discs. Pairings included "Animal Farm" and "Did You See His Name" as well as "Rosemary Rose" and "Berkeley Mews".) Despite Ray's protestations that the song was insufficiently commercial for release as a single, Pye rush-released it in the UK on 5 April. Its B-side "Polly", also recorded in March, indicated Ray's continued interested in Under Milk Wood by directly referencing a character in the drama, Polly Garter. Though it was moderately advertised and was well received by music critics, "Wonderboy" flopped in the UK and was the band's worst performing British single since 1964. The failure ended the band's streak of twelve consecutive top twenty hits, the last five of which had made it into the top five. It sold 26,000 copies in the UK, roughly one-tenth of each of the band's two most recent singles, "Waterloo Sunset" (May 1967) and "Autumn Almanac" (October 1967). (Note: To make up for the lack of sales by "Wonderboy", Pye released two EPs in the UK on 19 April – Dave Davies Hits and The Kinks – mostly made up of material from Something Else.)

Recording for the album paused from 6 to 28 April 1968 as the Kinks toured cinemas across the UK. Further indicating their diminishing status, the band were unable to support themselves as the headlining act but instead shared the bill with the Herd. Supporting acts included the Tremeloes and Ola & the Janglers, among other groups. Contemporary reviewers criticised the Kinks for their poor stage presence and often inaudible vocals; Dave later recalled that the band were insufficiently rehearsed due to Ray's intense focus on his songwriting and a lack of motivation among the other Kinks.

==== May–June ====
The band resumed work on the album in May 1968, recording "Picture Book", "Misty Water" and "Pictures in the Sand". (Note: "Misty Water" and "Pictures in the Sand" remained unreleased until 1973 on The Great Lost Kinks Album.) After the commercial disappointment of "Wonderboy", Ray opted to record his new composition "Days" as quickly as possible in order to reestablish the Kinks' status. Recording for the song concluded in early June and it was issued as a single in the UK on the 28th. Though the single was not as successful as the band's earlier hits, it received strong airplay and helped them return to the top twenty of the British charts, reaching No. 12 and No. 14 in Record Retailer and Melody Maker, respectively. Hinman writes that by early June, Ray's solo LP and the band's next album had "[slowly] mutated into one" under the expected title Village Green. Pye Records allowed the band extra time to record more tracks for Village Green and made plans to release the album in September in the lead-up to Christmas 1968.

Throughout the 1960s, the Kinks were on different record labels in the US and UK and had differing contract schedules between the two countries. By June 1968, the band were contractually obligated to immediately submit a finished LP to their US label, Reprise Records. Of those songs the band had already recorded, except "Village Green", Ray sent fifteen to the label. The label titled the album Four More Respected Gentlemen in reference to "A Well Respected Man". After Reprise learned about the Kinks' plans for a September release of Village Green, the label planned to not issue Four More Respected Gentlemen immediately but instead scheduled a November release. The band again took time off from recording for a tour of Sweden from 8 to 23 June 1968. Because of the band's weakening reputation, the booking agency and the band's new agent, Barry Dickens, scheduled them to perform at outdoor public parks, seeing it as the only realistic way for the band to turn a profit.

==== July–August ====
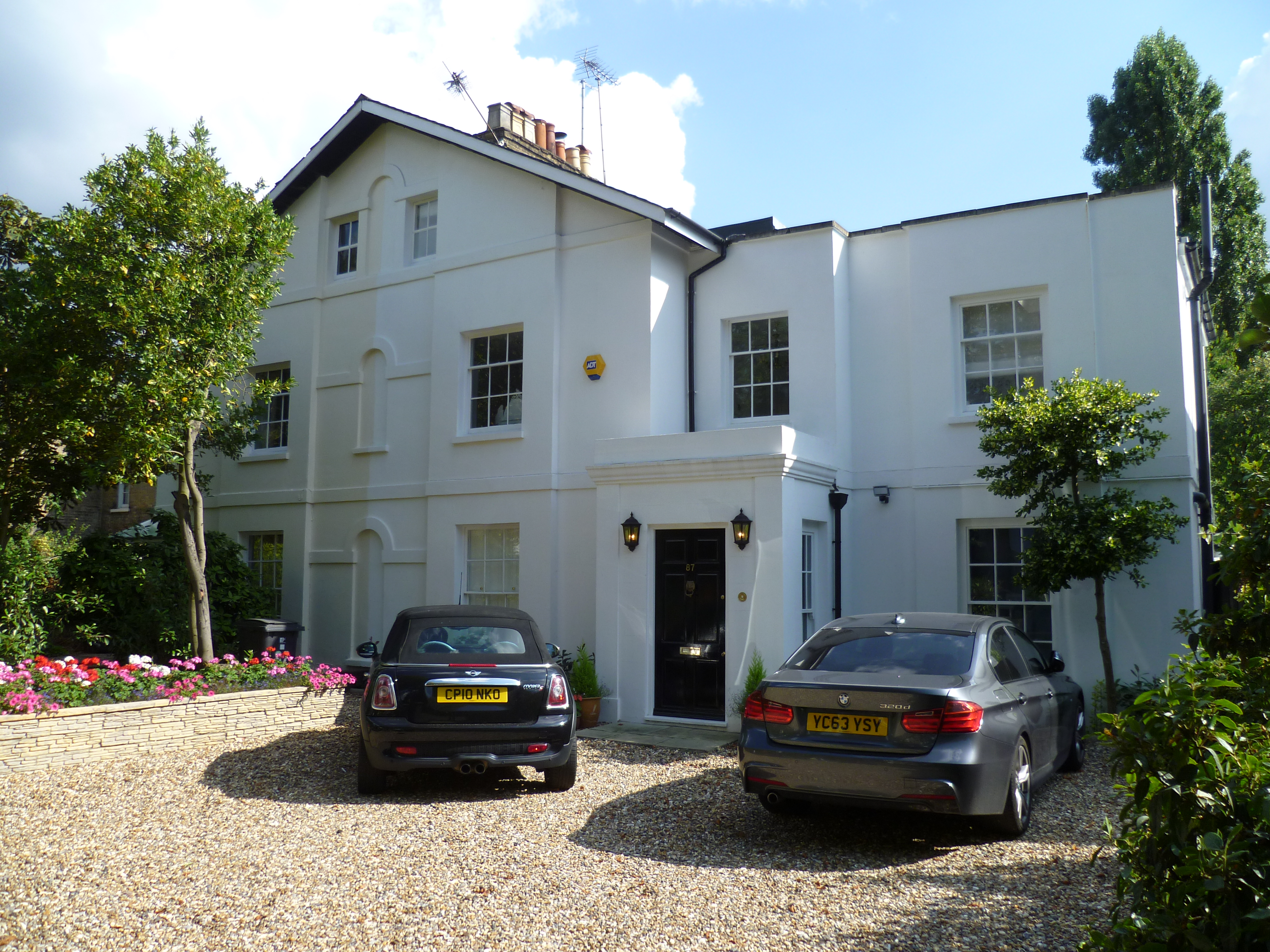
Ray Davies's former home at 87 Fortis Green, North London (pictured 2016), where he composed and first rehearsed most of the LP's songs

After returning from Sweden, the band began rehearsing more songs for Village Green in July at Ray's Fortis Green home. To boost the album's track listing, the Kinks spent most of the second half of July recording new songs. New tracks included "Do You Remember Walter", "Wicked Annabella", "Starstruck", "People Take Pictures of Each Other" and "Sitting by the Riverside". In late July, Ray and his family moved out of their Fortis Green home to a larger Tudor house in Borehamwood, Hertfordshire. Ray's previous work had been heavily inspired by life in the original area, not far from his and his brother's childhood home. He later reflected that as soon as he moved into the new house he felt unhappy. (Note: In his autobiography, Ray dates the move to before the writing of Village Green. Band biographers instead write it occurred during the band's two-week holiday from 27 July to 12 August 1968, after the album had been mostly written and recorded. Miller connects Ray's bleak memories of moving to both the commercial failure of Village Green and his early work on both "Plastic Man" (1969) and Arthur.)

In mid-August 1968, the Kinks recorded Ray's new composition "The Village Green Preservation Society". Ray intended for the song to be the last recorded for the album, making it a twelve track LP. With its recording, he changed the album's title to The Kinks are the Village Green Preservation Society and did its final mixing. Publishing was assigned for the LP's songs on 16 August. Around the same time, Ray interviewed with Record Mirror and New Musical Express (NME) magazines in anticipation of the album's release, and the album cover was photographed.

==== September–November ====
In September 1968, with recording for Village Green finished, the Kinks returned to Pye to record Ray's composition "Till Death Us Do Part" for a film of the same name. Extracts from the LP were played by Pye executives at the label's international sales conference, held on 5 and 6 September at London's Europa Hotel, and around 11 September, Keith Altham of NME listened to a tape of the album at the band's manager's office. Before Altham's favourable review was published in the 21 September issue of NME, Ray had Pye halt the album's production and postpone its planned UK release of 27 September.

Ray's reason for delaying Village Green's release is unclear. Hinman writes the last-minute decision foreshadowed major conflicts between Pye and Ray in late 1968. Ray later suggested he was annoyed that the label demanded hit singles from him and afforded little support for full-length LPs, and Hinman suggests this annoyance moved Ray to withhold from Pye any potential Kinks singles. Miller suggests Ray may have desired to increase Village Green's track listing after becoming aware that both the Beatles and the Jimi Hendrix Experience would be issuing double albums. (Note: Apple Records announced on 22 September that the Beatles' November release would include 24 songs on two LPs. When released, the Beatles' "White Album" featured 30 songs.) On 30 September, a press release stated that the Kinks' next album would be released in a month as a double-record with at least eighteen songs. Interviewed in October for next month's issue of Beat Instrumental magazine, drummer Mick Avory explained that the band were talking to their record label about the possibility of having twenty songs on two LPs but sold for the price of one, something they hoped would give fans more for their money. After Ray suggested the change to Pye, the label rejected it for financial reasons but accepted a compromise of a fifteen-song single-disc LP.

The Kinks returned to Pye Studios around 12 October 1968 to record more tracks for the album, including "Big Sky", "Last of the Steam-Powered Trains" and "All of My Friends Were There", though the latter may have been recorded in July. Ray remixed several songs from the July sessions on 28 October, likely because his original mixes from August had been rushed. He submitted the final tapes to Pye for the fifteen-track LP in November. In anticipation of the UK release of Village Green, Reprise cancelled Four More Respected Gentlemen in October, only a month before its planned release.

== Production ==
=== Studio aesthetic and sound ===
Village Green is the Kinks' first studio album which credits Ray as its producer. Halfway through the sessions for Something Else, he and the band's longtime producer Shel Talmy experienced a breakdown in their relationship, resulting in a mixture of tracks produced by one or the other. (Note: Though Talmy produced the song "Village Green", the liner notes of Village Green instead credit Ray, who produced all of the album's other tracks.) Engineer Brian Humphries later reflected that though Ray was not formally trained as a producer, he had become "quite knowledgeable" by the time of Village Green due to his practice of standing behind Talmy during the production process of the band's earlier albums. Ray's production of Village Green is subdued and his mix is generally light on the bottom end. Author Nicholas Schaffner describes the production as "unassuming in the extreme, with embellishments kept to a minimum". Ray subsequently suggested he under-recorded the songs, either deliberately or out of inexperience, resulting in a demo-like sound.

The album uses a variety of contrasting instruments and sounds, such as harmonica, harpsichord and flute, as well as guitar feedback. The Kinks' recording process generally consisted of laying down the rhythm track first, featuring drums, bass and Ray on piano or rhythm guitar. The band would next overdub percussion, keyboards and a guitar contribution from Dave, before mixing down the recording to make room for vocal contributions. The recordings are generally driven by Ray's 1965 Fender Malibu acoustic guitar, while Dave often supplemented an electric guitar contribution on Ray's 1963 Fender Telecaster or with one of his own guitars, such as his 1959 Gibson Flying V or Guild Starfire III. Dave's typical Vox AC30 amplifier was likely used for most tracks, though the long sustain heard on "Wicked Annabella" suggests the use of an early-era solid-state amplifier. Four microphones were placed around Avory's drum kit and Pete Quaife's Rickenbacker bass was plugged directly into the mixing desk. Avory altered his drum sound on "Wicked Annabella" and "Picture Book" by disengaging the snare and deadened the sound on "Phenomenal Cat" by placing newspaper over a floor tom.

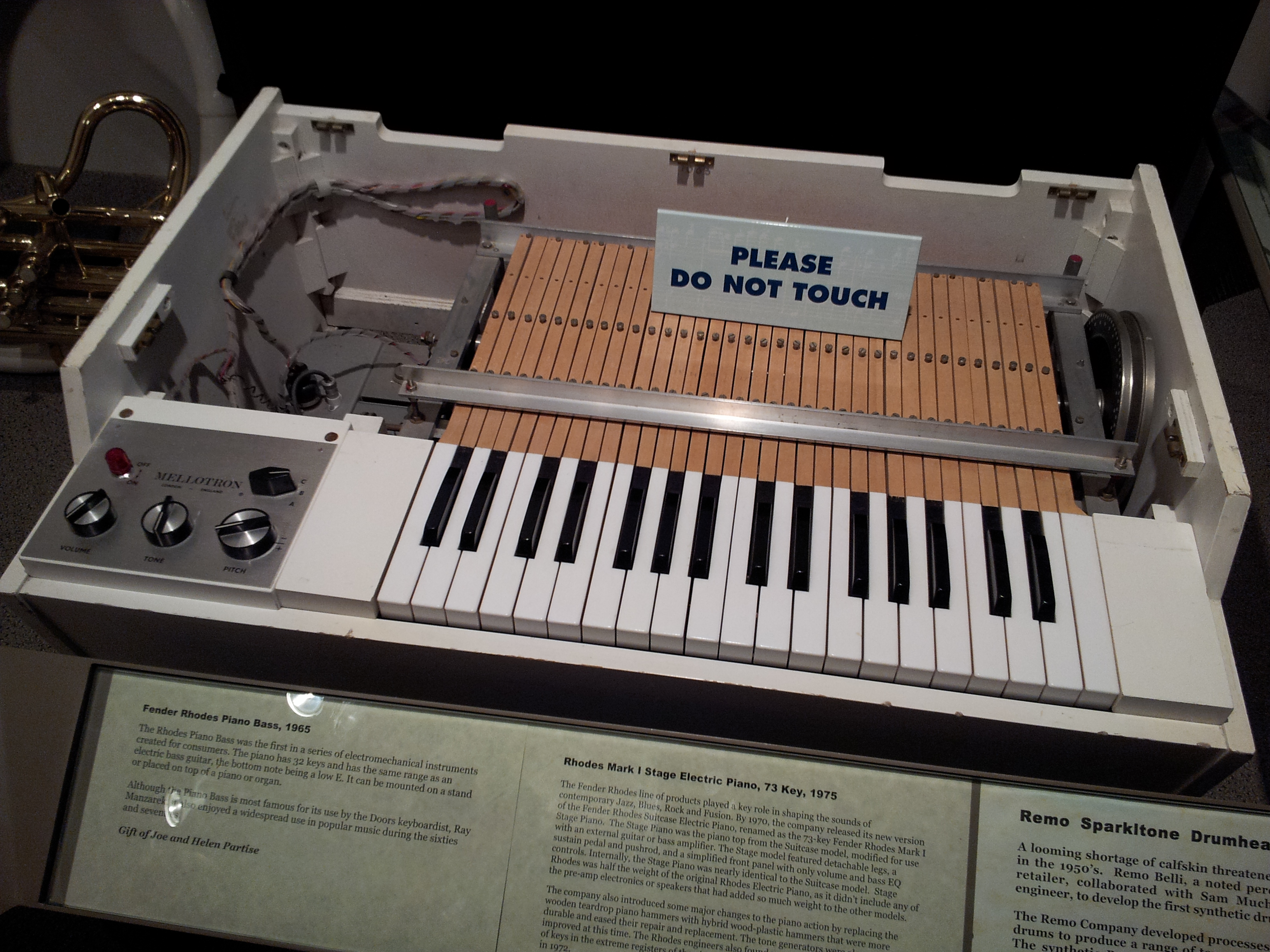
A 1960s-era Mellotron, similar to the one used during the Village Green sessions as an inexpensive alternative to real string and brass sections

Among the songs on Village Green with real string sections are "Village Green" and possibly "Animal Farm", as arranged by English composer David Whitaker. (Note: Miller and Hinman write that Whitaker only arranged "Village Green", Miller further specifying that the string sounds on "Animal Farm" were made with a Mellotron. In his liner notes to the album's 50th anniversary release, Andy Neill writes that Whitaker arranged real strings for both "Village Green" and "Animal Farm".) String and brass sections are generally absent from the Kinks' late 1960s recordings, likely because Pye executives saw the hiring of an arranger and session players as too expensive to warrant; the album prominently employs a Mellotron as an inexpensive alternative. A predecessor to the synthesiser, the Mellotron is a keyboard instrument on which the keys trigger tape loops of recordings of a variety of instruments, enabling its user to play keyboard parts using those voices. Ray was introduced to the instrument in May 1967 while visiting the home of Graham Nash, a member of the contemporary English rock band the Hollies. He purchased his own soon after and likely first employed it in early June 1967 on the Kinks' song "Lazy Old Sun". The sounds it mimics on Village Green include a horn section ("Do You Remember Walter"), accordion ("Sitting by the Riverside") and flute ("Phenomenal Cat"), among others.

Session musician Nicky Hopkins contributed extensive keyboard work for the album on piano, harpsichord and Mellotron. Hopkins had first contributed to a Kinks LP in 1965 on The Kink Kontroversy and his playing featured heavily on the band's releases to 1968. He later estimated he played "about seventy per cent" of the LP's keyboard work, while Ray played the rest, though the album's liner notes credit all of the keyboard playing to Ray. (Note: Hopkins expressed his anger towards Ray over the crediting in a 1969 interview, and he later suggested that the band did not compensate him for his work during the sessions. The issue led to a dissolution in the relationship between Hopkins and the band, which Hinman describes as "yet another nail in the coffin of the classic 1960s Kinks sound".)

Ray sings lead on each song except "Wicked Annabella", where Dave sings lead. Ray's vocal is generally double tracked throughout. The group sang harmony vocals together, often supplemented by a falsetto from Ray's wife Rasa Davies, who had sung backing vocals on all of the band's studio albums to that point. Typical of the band's vocal work, their barbershop harmonies include falsettos and wordless sounds like "la la" ("Village Green"), "na na" ("Picture Book") and "ba ba" ("Johnny Thunder") or nonsense phrases like "fum fum didle um di" ("Phenomenal Cat").

=== Band dynamics ===
When the Kinks rehearsed and recorded Ray's new compositions, he typically avoided sharing the songs' lyrics or melody with his bandmates. Quaife recalled:

Rehearsals took place at Ray's house, but they were often quite odd. He would keep us waiting for ages, then appear, play a song on a piano and we'd try it. Then he'd announce, "You've got it!" and disappear again. I didn't know what to think.

Avory suggested the practice arose out of Ray's paranoia that his songs would be stolen, while Quaife ascribed it to "Ray playing silly buggers". Both Avory and Quaife recalled being annoyed by the method since it prevented them from easily adding fills and embellishments that fitted the song. (Note: When recording "Village Green", Ray advised Avory that it was a soul track and that he should play like Al Jackson Jr., drummer of R&B singer Otis Redding. Ray later recalled the event marked "how dysfunctional [the band had] become", since it was only after they overdubbed the orchestral arrangement and vocals that Avory realised "he'd been totally conned".) Ray explained to his bandmates that he wanted the songs of Village Green to relate to a single subject but he otherwise remained secretive about the details. Quaife later stated that the band began to understand the album's message once several compositions had been finished and that "[a]bout the time of 'Animal Farm', it all clicked".

Pete [Quaife] and I were trying to get the excitement of our performances on record and that's just the way it came out. On songs like "Big Sky," I'd think of a bass part and give it to him and he'd change it around – play off the melody, like Paul McCartney was starting to do at the time, because they both started as guitar players – and it would create something completely different and also really new-sounding.

— Dave Davies, 2014

In contrast to the Kinks' work under Talmy, Ray ensured the group ran through numerous takes of songs on Village Green. Avory recalled that after Talmy's departure, the group spent more time collaborating and "[fleshing] out the sound" in studio. All group members contributed to the recording process, though Ray held final say over all decisions. He required all band members to attend all sessions, regardless of whether they were expected to play on the particular song. Quaife recalled: "He'd keep you there for hours and he wouldn't let you out of the studio either. You'd have to be there even though you weren't doing anything."

By 1968, the Kinks had developed a reputation for group infighting, especially between Ray and Dave, and the group sometimes broke into physical altercations during rehearsals, recording sessions and concerts. Humphries later said that the band's dysfunction has been overemphasised in later accounts, adding that rather than fistfights, disagreements typically led to verbal arguments between Ray and Dave. Rasa often served as an intermediary in the studio between Ray and his bandmates. (Note: In subsequent interviews, Humphries recalled that Rasa "kept the peace a lot". Quaife has sometimes said that she eased group tensions, but he has also suggested that her presence catalysed anger within the band.) Tensions within the group culminated on 27 May 1968 during a session for "Days", during which Ray and Quaife argued before the latter left the studio. (Note: In both Ray and Dave's mid-1990s autobiographies, they recall the argument starting after Quaife crossed out the word Days on the track's tape box and substituted Daze. Quaife instead recalled that while he was bored listening to numerous playbacks of the song, he doodled a cartoon character on the tape box. He further stated that Ray changed the cartoon character to the word Daze in retellings because "it makes a better story".) Quaife remained unhappy following the incident, and he later recalled that he and Ray remained distant from one another during the band's June tour of Sweden. (Note: As the Kinks prepared to fly to Dublin for an evening show on 1 June, Quaife stepped off the plane shortly before it departed. His absence was not noticed by his bandmates until after their arrival and necessitated the cancellation of the performance.)

For me [Village Green] represents the only real album made by the Kinks. It is probably the only album made by us in which we all contributed something.

— Pete Quaife, 2005

Tensions in the group eased after the Kinks returned to England and resumed recording in July, at which time Ray reluctantly allowed for more creative input from his bandmates. Avory recalled it was the first time in the group's history that they worked together during recordings. Quaife was unsure what precipitated Ray's change, but remembered the period as being "amazing", with a "lightened up" Ray allowing them to suggest things during both the rehearsal and recording process. He further remembered Ray's reluctance returning near the end of the album's recording sessions. Though Quaife departed the Kinks roughly four months after the release of Village Green, he reflected decades later that the album was the high point of his career, mostly due to the collaborative nature of its recording.

=== Mono and stereo versions ===
Despite an industrywide trend towards stereo sound, Ray still favoured mono when he mixed Village Green. As was typical for the time, he mixed the album in both formats, and Pye released both versions of the album in the UK. In the US, Reprise's parent company Warner Bros.-Seven Arts halted mono production in January 1968; Village Green was therefore the Kinks' second US LP after Something Else to be issued exclusively in stereo.

The album's stereo and mono mixes contained obvious difference from one another. (Note: The mono mix of "Do You Remember Walter" has more electric guitar, less Mellotron and no tambourine, while "Wicked Annabella" has more reverb and is louder. The mono mixes of both "Starstruck" and "People Take Pictures of Each Other" last for a few extra seconds.) Because Ray remixed some tracks in late October 1968 after finding his original August mixes rushed, the twelve- and fifteen-track editions contained additional differences. (Note: The original stereo mix of "Do You Remember Walter" featured on the twelve-track album has no acoustic guitar or tambourine.) The original stereo ending of "People Take Pictures of Each Other" featured a jazz band coda lifted from a pre-existing tape, which Miller writes served to express "That's All, Folks!" at the album's close. Ray was forced to erase it from subsequent mixes due to copyright issues, but not before it was included on the stereo release of the twelve-track edition of Village Green.

== Songs ==
=== Overview ===
==== Music ====
Among musicologists and band biographers, Andy Miller and Mike Segretto say that Village Green is composed mainly of rock and pop music, while Mark Doyle sees it as an album of various genres; Doyle writes it draws from "eclectic and cosmopolitan" styles, fitting in the contemporary Pop art movement. According to Doyle and Segretto, the music incorporates the stylistic influences of "English folk-pastoral traditions", music hall, psychedelia, calypso, blues, raga rock and acid rock.

Music critics Jonathan Donaldson and Jem Aswad each place the album with the baroque pop of the late 1960s – exemplified by the Zombies' 1968 album Odessey and Oracle, Love's 1967 album Forever Changes and the music of the Left Banke – a trend critic Greg Kot terms "orchestral guitar-pop". The Smithsonian Institution's book on the history of music groups the album with the pop-rock of the 1960s and the genre's trend towards cohesive albums rather than collections of popular singles. Musicologist Stan Hawkins describes the album's sound as generally "flowery, tranquil and dreamy", influenced equally by music hall and American rock and roll, and author Patricia Gordon Sullivan writes that many of its songs further the music hall overtones first established the previous year on Something Else. (Note: Ray later recalled that though he never went to a music hall performance as a child, his style of composition was heavily influenced by his father, who regularly went to musicals and dances and encouraged his children to sing songs at the piano; Miller and Sullivan suggest the sing-along style is evident on songs like "People Take Pictures of Each Other" and "All of My Friends Were There".) Ray instead subsequently characterised the album as departure from the band's previous music, terming its songs "rock/folk tunes". Hal Horowitz of American Songwriter magazine similarly writes that the album's generally acoustic approach and simple production made it more readily described as "melodic folk/pop" than as rock music.

==== Lyrics and concept ====
In contemporary interviews, Ray explained that the songs on Village Green are "all related in a way", and Dave suggested that the album is "about a town and the people that have lived there", where "the village green is the focal point of the whole thing". The tracks often serve as portraits of the village's inhabitants or as a description of local attractions or activities; character studies include "Johnny Thunder", "Monica" and "Do You Remember Walter", about a biker, a prostitute and a lost friend, respectively. Other songs display an interest in memory and its relationship with photographs, such as "Picture Book", "People Take Pictures of Each Other", the unreleased song "Pictures in the Sand" and "Village Green", where the value of the community consists in being photographed by American tourists. In a May 1969 interview, Ray stated that the album expressed his love of "traditional British things" and his hope that they would persist. He added:

I never go watch cricket any more, but I like to know it's there. It's like not being able to read Eagle any more. And it's bad for people to grow up and not know what a china cup is – or a village green. In other words, I'd rather have the actual things here not just pictures of things we used to have.

While the songs on Village Green vary in their adherence to the village concept, the album displays a consistent preoccupation with the past. Academics Robert Polito and Carey Fleiner write that while some listeners regard the album as an indulgence in nostalgia, its songs often instead rebuff those who constantly reminisce on the past. Gentle sentiments about the past are often directly contrasted against a general cynicism or rude voicing. (Note: Miller writes that several of Ray's compositions employ a similar format of having one stinging line, an idea Ray elucidated in a December 1969 interview: "If you can make a funny song and then have one very hard line, you reach people." Miller contends the technique can be heard on "Last of the Steam-Powered Trains", "Big Sky", "All of My Friends Were There", "Mr. Songbird" and especially "People Take Pictures of Each Other", which he thinks ends with a whimper of, "please, don't show me any more".) Like Polito, academic Barbara Carroll writes that its songs yearn for refuge from the alienating present while recognising that it is impossible to go back, and Fleiner contends that it recommends using the common cultural experiences of the past to cope with issues in the present.

=== Side one ===
==== "The Village Green Preservation Society" ====
Everybody's trying to change the world; I've tried and I'll probably try again, but I don't think you can change Britain that much, because we're the way we are. So I'm just going to try and hang on to a lot of the nice things.

— Ray Davies, November 1968

In a contemporary interview, Ray explained that he composed "The Village Green Preservation Society" after someone suggested to him that the Kinks had been preserving "nice things from the past". The song states the band's intentions to "preserve" things and consists of a listing of British institutions to be saved for posterity, including vaudeville, the George Cross medal and its recipients, draught beer and virginity, among others. Ray subsequently described the song as the album's "national anthem". Employing a simple composition, its arrangement is defined by what Miller terms Avory's "especially exuberant" drumming and the "similarly light and effective" piano contribution. (Note: Miller believes Hopkins played the piano, since a version the Kinks recorded for the BBC on 26 November 1968 features Ray playing the keyboard with "a somewhat less steady hand". Hinman instead writes Hopkins's last appearance on a Kinks' song was likely around mid-July 1968 on "People Take Pictures of Each Other", before the mid-August recording of "The Village Green Preservation Society".) Ray and Dave closely harmonise throughout, while Ray's voice is emphasised at the midway point and its closing.

==== "Do You Remember Walter" ====
Ray was inspired to compose "Do You Remember Walter" after running into a childhood friend and finding they no longer had anything in common. The singer recalls his and Walter's various childhood exploits, which he contrasts against the older Walter who he expects is now fat and married. He mocks Walter's early bedtime, while he imagines that Walter would be uninterested in his reminiscing of the past. Rogan compares the song to Ray's 1967 composition "David Watts" and suggests it conveys "a loss of almost tragic proportions" when the Walter character is "demythologised in adulthood". In his November 1968 interview with Melody Maker, Ray stated that the song's message was summarised in its closing line: "People often change but memories of people can remain". After opening with what Rogan terms "machine gun drumming", the song is defined by a dominant piano and bass guitar, alongside snare rolls.

==== "Picture Book" ====
Excerpt from the chorus of "Picture Book"
Unlike the rest of the album, the mix of "Picture Book" is comparatively bottom-heavy by emphasising Avory's drumming and Quaife's bass playing.

"Picture Book" describes an ageing narrator's experience flipping through a photo album reflecting on happy memories from "a long time ago". The vocals include wordless barbershop-like harmonies as well as Ray singing "scooby dooby doo" in reference to Frank Sinatra's 1966 single "Strangers in the Night". The song employs two acoustic guitars and an overdubbed electric guitar. Quaife doubles Ray's rhythm guitar with his bass in playing the song's distinctive hook. Unlike most of the album's songs, its mix emphasises the low-end, particularly Quaife's bass guitar and Avory's drums, the latter of which critic Stewart Mason terms "cleverly sloppy".

==== "Johnny Thunder" ====
Ray composed "Johnny Thunder" after watching László Benedek's 1953 film The Wild One, which had been banned by British censors until February 1968. Like the film's lead character Johnny, played by Marlon Brando, Johnny Thunder is a rebellious biker and an enemy of conformity. A straightforward rock song, the recording joins acoustic guitars, bass and drums with an electric guitar contribution by Dave, who plays a countermelody low in the mix. The backing vocals are wordless and imitate the sound of a brass section, while it is one of the few instances on the album of Ray's lead vocal not being double-tracked.

==== "Last of the Steam-Powered Trains" ====
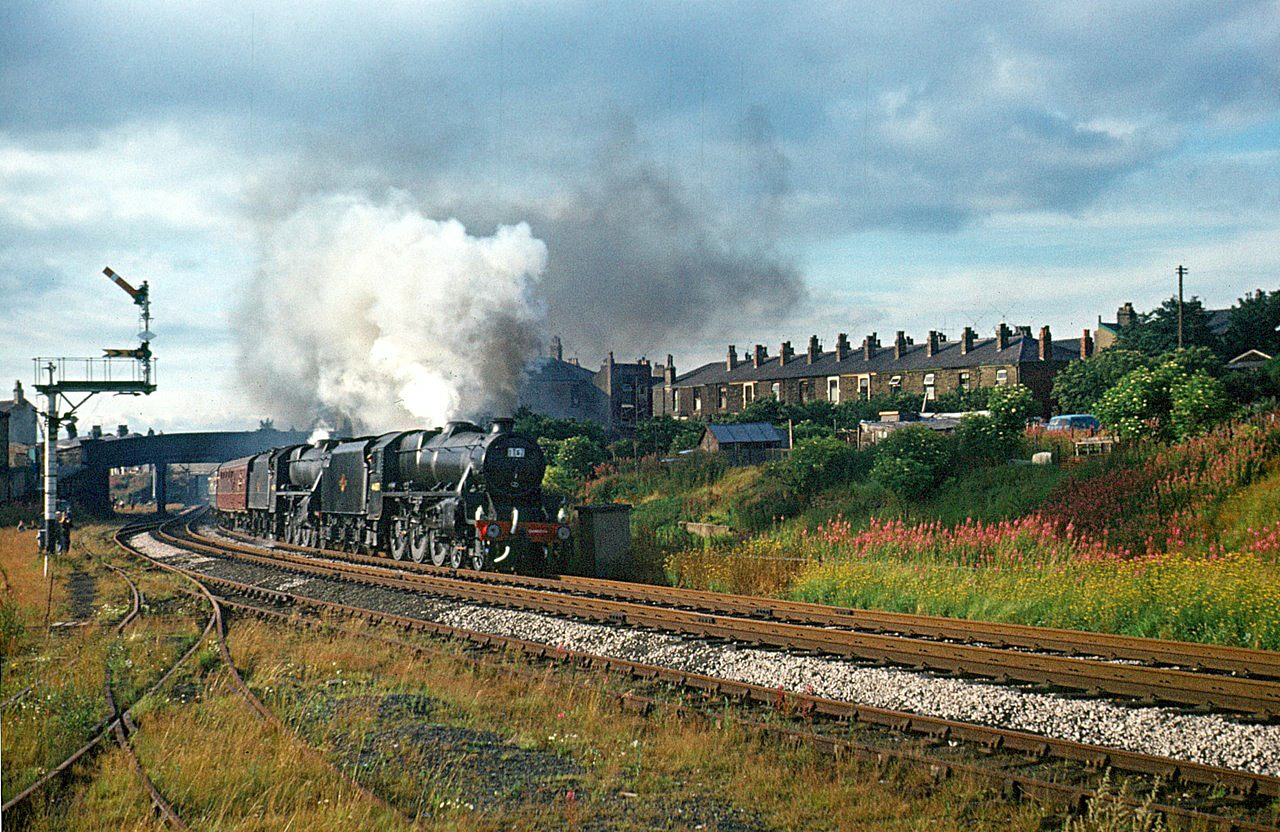
The Fifteen Guinea Special in August 1968 (pictured) marked Britain's final mainline passenger service by steam-powered locomotive.

"Last of the Steam-Powered Trains" is likely the last song Ray wrote for Village Green. Its lyrics describe a steam train that has outlived its usefulness and moved to a museum. The composition coincided with a years-long reduction in the British railway network and the replacement of steam trains by diesel engines, a change which went into effect two months before the song's recording. Based on the riff of Howlin' Wolf's 1956 song "Smokestack Lightning" – a popular recording among early 1960s British R&B groups – the song recalls the Kinks' roots as an R&B focused band. Several commentators regard the song as Ray's criticism of early British R&B groups for being inauthentic compared to the American blues artists who wrote many of the songs they recorded, while others think it expresses his feelings of disconnect from contemporary culture.

==== "Big Sky" ====
Ray composed "Big Sky" in late January 1968 while attending the second annual MIDEM festival, a music publishers gathering held in Cannes, France. While watching the sunrise from his balcony at the Carlton Hotel, he noticed the businessmen walking below, a moment which inspired the line "Big Sky looking down on all the people". While Ray has typically been coy about interpreting the song's meaning, retrospective commentators often interpret it as describing God as unsympathetic towards the problems of humans. Ray's lead vocal alternates between singing, speaking and harmonising with Dave while Rasa contributes a wordless falsetto harmony. Ray compared his spoken lyric to the voice of God, and Dave later suggested that Ray was impersonating American actor Burt Lancaster.

==== "Sitting by the Riverside" ====
"Sitting by the Riverside" joins honky-tonk piano with an accordion produced via Mellotron. The singer enjoys the calmness and warmth offered by a pastoral setting before closing his eyes results in a rush of overwhelming memories and fear. Accompanying the eye-closing moment is a swelling cacophony reminiscent of the orchestral crescendos heard in the Beatles' 1967 song "A Day in the Life". When the singer reopens his eyes, he is overtaken by the area's splendor. Ray contemporaneously described the composition as a "fishing song" and related it to his time spent fishing when he was a child. (Note: Miller suggests the song was further inspired by Orwell's Coming Up for Air, since the happiest childhood memories of the novel's protagonist, George Bowling, relate to his time spent fishing.)

=== Side two ===
==== "Animal Farm" ====
The beginning of the first verse of "Animal Farm"
In addition to heavy reverb on its drums, percussion and tack piano, the song being recorded in Pye's bigger studio provided it with a noticeably larger sound than the rest of the record.

Side two of the LP opens with "Animal Farm". While its title references Orwell's 1945 novella of the same name, the song does not relate to the book's dystopic themes, but instead displays an anti-urban theme. The song's narrator expresses feelings of pastoral bliss, recalling an earlier time when he was happy living a simple life on a small farm. He yearns for his idealised world where people can be authentic rather than insincere actors. Recorded in Pye Studios's bigger studio, No. 1, the song has a larger sound than the rest of the album, featuring reverb on the drums, percussion and tack piano.

==== "Village Green" ====
Ray composed "Village Green" in August 1966 while touring in rural England. He later recalled the song spawning from his disappointment after finding out that the beer at a pub was stored in a pressurised metal keg rather than in a traditional wooden barrel. (Note: In a 1974 interview with Rolling Stone, Ray connects the pub story to the album's "original song, 'Village Green Preservation Society'", which he says was written "about eight years ago". Hinman and Hasted each write Ray meant "Village Green".) The song's lyrics lament the decline of a fictional English community's traditional village green. The singer mourns the town's invasion by American tourists and the community's cheapening atmosphere, while remembering it as the place he left his romantic love Daisy. He declares that he will return to see Daisy so they can reminisce about the green as it was. The composition and instrumentation of "Village Green" evoke Baroque music; Hopkins played the prominently featured harpsichord, and Whitaker's orchestral arrangement features oboe, cello, viola and piccolo, all played by session musicians.

==== "Starstruck" ====
Ray later said he wrote "Starstruck" as a tribute to his favourite Motown groups, including the Four Tops and the Temptations, and Miller writes it has a slight resemblance to the Four Tops' 1965 single "It's the Same Old Song". Rogan instead writes "Starstruck" displays "a distinct Acapulco-flavouring" with vocal harmonies influenced by the American band the Turtles. In the song, the singer politely chastises a female listener for failing to distinguish between stardom and real-life and further warns her about the risks of the big city. Miller suggests the song's warning about city life is similar thematically to "Village Green", and Rayes writes its comparison helps contrast "rural with urban, spirituality with materialism, and the natural with the manufactured".

==== "Phenomenal Cat" ====
The beginning of "Phenomenal Cat"
The recording's flute opening was achieved by holding down the keys on the Mellotron and allowing each tape loop to spool all the way through. Author Steve Alleman considers the song's Mellotron contribution one of the few times in the Kinks' discography where they approach psychedelia.

"Phenomenal Cat" tells the story of a flying cat who has visited exotic places like Katmandu and Hong Kong. After discovering "the secret of life", he decides to spend the rest of his life eating. Rogan compares its "vaguely Victorian flavour" to the work of English 19th-century authors Edward Lear and Lewis Carroll, while Miller instead describes it as a blend of contemporary children's music and psychedelia. Miller suggests Ray intended the song to satirise the contemporary psychedelic scene, and Rogan similarly thinks it satirises the late-1960s trend of searching for spiritual enlightenment. (Note: In particular, Rogan thinks Ray was thinking of contemporaries like Pete Townshend in his following of Indian spiritual master Meher Baba or the Beatles learning Transcendental Meditation from Maharishi Mahesh Yogi.) Ray's lead vocal is double tracked while Dave sings as the cat, his voice altered by recording the master tape slowly and then playing it sped-up.

==== "All of My Friends Were There" ====
"All of My Friends Were There" was inspired by a Kinks concert at Rectory Field in Blackheath, London on 1 July 1967. Ray later recalled falling ill with a fever, but the event organisers persuaded him to perform due to the agreed contract. In the song, the singer describes his embarrassment after his friends attend his missed performance. After struggling during his next show, he goes to a café he frequented during happier times in his life, only to find all of his friends there as well. Rayes describes the ending "another typical [Ray] Davies twist", where "in the end, the presence of the singer's friends both deepens his embarrassment and strengthens his stability and sense of companionship". Played in the style of music hall, the song employs an organ and a jerky rhythm, shifting between what Miller terms a "music-hall gallop" in the verses and a "lilting, wistful waltz" during the choruses.

==== "Wicked Annabella" ====
"Wicked Annabella" features Dave's only lead vocal contribution on the album; his voice is double tracked and ranges from frightened whispers to raging screams. The lyrics recount the deeds of a local witch as a warning to children to stay in their beds and avoid the woods. In his November 1968 interview with Melody Maker, Ray suggested the recording was his attempt at getting a song "to sound as horrible as it could", resulting in an overall "rude sound". Employing guitar feedback, the song's main riff is reminiscent of the Doors' 1967 song "Light My Fire", while its conclusion of interplay between drums and guitar features Dave's laughter and heavy echo and reverb. Critic Jim DeRogatis counts the song as the only example of psychedelia in the Kinks' discography, while author Steve Alleman instead writes that its "freakout ending" is one of the few times the Kinks approached the genre, without actually achieving it.

==== "Monica" ====
"Monica" is a calypso number, a genre Ray first explored in his 1965 song "I'm on an Island". The composition incorporates Caribbean rhythms and jazz tempo changes, while the recording features acoustic guitar, congas and organ. Possibly inspired by the character Polly Garter from Thomas's Under Milk Wood, the lyrics are a serenade for a prostitute. In order to avert a radio-ban, Ray was deliberately subtle in its writing and never directly mentions her profession.

==== "People Take Pictures of Each Other" ====
"People Take Pictures of Each Other" satirises the absurdity of using photographs to prove one's existence. Ray was inspired to write the song after he attended a wedding and found it strange that the newlywed couple took turns photographing one another. Its lyrics recall the oak tree from "Village Green" and the theme of photography from "Picture Book", leading Miller to hypothesise that Ray composed it specifically to be a closing track. Rogan describes the song's sound as a cross between a Cossack dance and a Greek wedding, something he relates to its original wedding inspiration. It employs a quickly strummed acoustic guitar and fast a breathless lead vocal from Ray. Hopkins plays harpsichord, along with what Miller terms a "silly vaudeville piano vamp".

=== European format ===
The original twelve-song edition of the album had been completed in mid-August 1968 and was released as such in Sweden, Norway, France, Italy and New Zealand. In addition to a rearranged track listing, it includes the songs "Days" and "Mr. Songbird" while being without "Last of the Steam-Powered Trains", "Big Sky", "Sitting by the Riverside", "Animal Farm" and "All of My Friends Were There".

"Days" recalls a past relationship, the singer remembering either a friend or lover. The song's theme of nostalgia lyrically relates it to the rest of Village Green, and Alleman writes its motif of "looking back yet trying to start anew" makes it the composition most representative of Ray's songwriting in the 1966–1968 period. Instrumentally, the recording incorporates acoustic and electric guitars, bass, harmonium, piano and a Mellotron which mimics a string section. "Mr. Songbird" is about a songbird whose call helps the singer's problems go away. Hopkins plays Mellotron to duplicate the sound of a flute, trilling during the chorus to mimic the sound of a bird. Miller suggests the song's escapist sentiment is comparable to other contemporary Ray compositions like "Picture Book", and author Christian Matijas-Mecca writes the song is thematically related to the album's "loose narrative about a desire for a lost England".

== Title and packaging ==
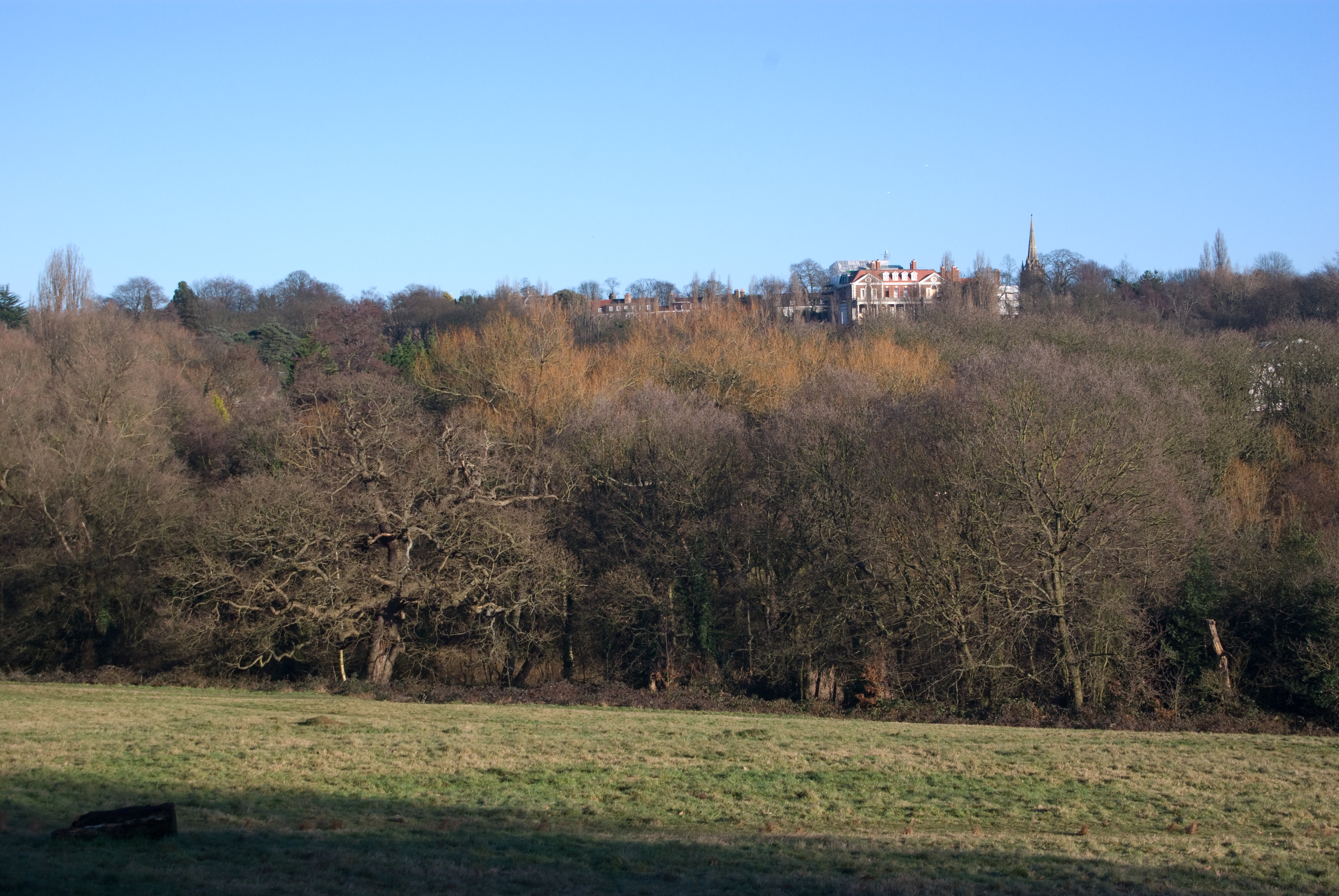
The Kinks photographed the album cover in mid-August 1968 on Hampstead Heath, north-west London (pictured 2011).

The album cover was photographed in mid-August 1968 during a photo session outside Kenwood House in Hampstead Heath, north-west London. Pye's in-house photographer John Prosser and Barrie Wentzell of Melody Maker photographed the session. After drinking tea on the terrace with the photographers, the band were photographed in their casual attire walking through the Heath's long, uncut grass to emphasise a country-feel. Prosser took the album's cover shot; the original twelve-track edition featured a black-and-white cover design, while the fifteen-track edition featured a different image, retouched to show the band enclosed in what Rogan terms "hazy, psychedelic circles". (Note: Pye had not informed Wentzell that the photo session was for an album and he was not aware one of his images was used on its rear sleeve until he purchased his own copy of the LP. He was neither credited nor compensated for the photograph until the album's later reissues.) The album's twelve-track releases in Scandinavia, France, Italy and New Zealand all feature unique album sleeves which have subsequently become valuable collector's items. Having been pressed in Britain, the Scandinavian edition features Pye's original black-and-white sleeve design. Fleiner suggests the New Zealand sleeve's depiction of the band standing next to several horses sought to emphasise the band's "Englishness". (Note: Author Peter Doggett suggested in 1998 that the New Zealand pressings were "[p]ossibly the rarest commercially pressed Kinks [LPs]". In a 2000 piece for Record Collector magazine discussing the different album sleeves, Andy Neill valued a mint copy of the New Zealand edition the highest at around £400 (equivalent to £760 in 2025).)

The album's twelve-track releases in different countries all feature unique sleeves (New Zealand cover artwork pictured).

Village Green served as the album's working title to mid-1968, though Ray remained unsatisfied that it was too narrow to encapsulate the album's broader themes. In a November 1968 interview, he recalled that in August, while searching for a new title, someone mentioned to him in conversation that "one of things The Kinks have been doing for the last three years has been preserving". The comment prompted him to compose "The Village Green Preservation Society", which subsequently became the new title track.

The LP was the Kinks' first to feature a gatefold sleeve. The gatefold image is the same photograph as the cover but flipped horizontally, tinted and placed alongside a George Cross medal. (Note: Commenting on the album's gatefold in early 1969, critic Robert Christgau suggested that "the promotional value of such extravagance has apparently dissipated".) The lyrics of the title track appear on the sleeve's rear. The album's title appears on the cover in small font, with The Kinks written large and detached from Are the Village Green Preservation Society. Rogan hypothesises that the album was supposed to be titled The Village Green Preservation Society but suspects it was changed during the production process. He contends that the simpler title would align with the title track and adds that Ray has typically used the shorter name in his interviews and writings.

== Release and commercial performance ==
=== United Kingdom and Europe ===
In the United Kingdom, Pye planned to release Village Green on 27 September 1968. Ray began press interviews in mid-August to promote its release, the band performed some of its songs for BBC Radio in July and Pye placed advertisements in several British pop magazines. Following Ray's last-minute request that its release be postponed, only test-pressings of the twelve-track edition were made in the UK. Because Pye had already made and sent production masters to several other countries, release of the twelve-track LP went ahead in Sweden and Norway on 9 October, with subsequent releases of that edition following in France, Italy and New Zealand.

Ray's last-minute delay of the LP resulted in confusion for both the music press and recording-buying public. Pye instead issued the rearranged and expanded edition of the album in the UK on 22 November 1968. The album had no associated lead single in the UK, but "Starstruck" was released in parts of continental Europe, backed with "Picture Book". To promote the European single, the Kinks filmed a black-and-white promotional film in late November 1968. It depicts the band walking around Waterlow Park in Highgate on a cold day and is similar in style to the photographs taken for Village Green's album cover. (Note: The promo film was later broadcast on Dutch television in December and is likely the last surviving footage of the band's original line-up. Both sides of the single appeared on charts in the Netherlands and Belgium's French-speaking region of Wallonia.) To promote the UK album release, Pye again placed advertisements in several British music magazines, the band performed songs for BBC Radio in November and lip synced for television performances on ITV and BBC Television in December 1968 and January 1969.

The release of Village Green was timed to correspond with the Christmas rush, and it was coincidentally issued the same day as the Beatles' eponymous album (commonly known as the "White Album"), and the Rolling Stones' Beggars Banquet followed a week-and-a-half later. Village Green was moderately advertised and reviewed, but its sales were quickly eclipsed by the other albums – the "White Album" sold two million copies worldwide in its first week, while Village Green failed to chart in the UK or anywhere in Europe. Exact figures for LP sales in the UK in the late 1960s are generally unavailable; in 1995, Ray suggested "worldwide we'd be lucky if it [sold] 100,000 [copies]". Rogan writes that the available context clues and Ray's later estimate suggest that the album was likely "a modest seller". Stiff competition from other releases during the holiday season kept the album from appearing in any UK album charts, which often only listed the top fifteen LPs. After Something Else failed to appear on most UK charts, Village Green's absence from all UK charts continued a decline in the performance of the Kinks' studio albums. The album marked the beginning of a commercial low for the band, from which they did not recover until their late 1970s US revival.

Both Miller and author Jon Savage suggest Village Green failed to register with the public, something they attribute to its separation from the contemporary culture's focus on revolution, protest and free love. Rogan counters that Ray and authors like Miller have overstated the album's commercial failings. Rather than finding the album out of step with contemporary culture, he writes its release corresponded with a surge of nostalgia and escapism in England, and that its championing of country living over city life aligned with the burgeoning ecology movement. (Note: Rogan writes the English desire for nostalgia and escapism was apparent in television programmes Dad's Army and The Forsyte Saga and popular literature like J. R. R. Tolkien's The Lord of the Rings and Mervyn Peake's Gormenghast series. He connects Ray's calls for preservation and "bucolic bliss" to the British public's reaction after a May 1968 gas explosion at a tower block in London, which led to the partial collapse of the building and several deaths.) Rogan adds that the contemporary music press were typically excited by unified albums and that Village Green's disconnect from psychedelia fitted with the back-to-basics approach adopted by many of the Kinks' contemporaries. (Note: Rogan mentions unified projects like Sgt. Pepper, Small Faces' Ogdens' Nut Gone Flake (1968) and Keith West's single "Excerpt from A Teenage Opera" (1967) as both exciting the press while being commercially successful. He writes the back-to-basics approach is apparent in the Beatles' "Lady Madonna" (March 1968), Dylan's John Wesley Harding (December 1967), the Band's Music from Big Pink (July 1968) and the Byrds' Sweetheart of the Rodeo (August 1968).) Rather than laying blame with the album's content or its marketing, Rogan attributes Village Green's commercial shortcomings to the Kinks' waning popularity and the album's lack of an associated single in Britain, which resulted in fewer opportunities for television appearances and publicity.

=== United States ===
In the United States, Reprise Records received Village Green's master tapes on 20 December 1968 and planned to issue the album in late January 1969. The label issued "Starstruck" as the album's lead single on 8 or 15 January 1969. The single was initially afforded little critical attention as Reprise neglected to send review copies to US magazines. Reviewers in both Cash Box and Billboard predicted the single would help the Kinks return to each magazine's chart, though it ultimately failed to position in any American chart.

Reprise likely issued Village Green in the US on 5 February 1969, though it may have been released in January. (Note: Hinman dates the release to 5 February 1969, adding it was "[p]ossibly a week earlier". Neill and Miller each write it was January 1969, without specifying a day.) It was not advertised or announced in any American music magazines. After critic Robert Christgau requested press material regarding the band in preparation for his album review, Warner Bros. Records sent him a group biography from 1964. Like in the UK and Europe, the album failed to appear in any American charts. The failure continued a trend of the Kinks' studio albums being outsold by compilations collecting their mid-1960s hits; by 1969, the 1966 US compilation The Kinks Greatest Hits! had sold over 200,000 copies, while the combined American sales of both Village Green and Something Else were estimated to be 25,000. In June 1969, it appeared on Cash Box's "Basic Album Inventory", a list intended to indicate to wholesalers and retailers which LPs were selling steadily despite having failed to appear on the Cash Box Top 100 Album chart.

== Contemporary critical reception ==
=== United Kingdom ===
On release, Village Green gained favourable reviews from the majority of music critics. The album was reviewed in most contemporary UK pop music publications. (Note: Reliable sources have sometimes erroneously reported that Village Green received no reviews in the UK music press. The liner notes to the 2008 box set Picture Book state that the album received no reviews, and Miller says its only write-up was in Disc and Music Echo. Rogan instead writes that it "certainly received a fair shout", having been reviewed in Melody Maker, Disc and Music Echo and NME at a time when British pop publications did not automatically review albums.) Additionally, while discussions of popular music in broadsheet newspapers was still uncommon in 1968, critic Judith Simons provided a brief assessment of the album in London's Daily Express.

Among British critics, Bob Dawbarn of Melody Maker declared in a feature review that the LP was "easily [the Kinks'] best". In another positive assessment, Disc and Music Echo's reviewer stated that Ray "managed to bypass everything psychedelic and electronic" by continuing to focus on "simple, even rustic melodies with words of wisdom". The reviewer concluded that though the Kinks were no longer widely popular, Village Green indicated that Ray would likely continue to be one of Britain's best composers. The reviewer for Top Pops commented that the album's themes and styles varied greatly with considerable thought put into its lyrics and production. He concluded that the LP provided good value-for-money and expected he would listen to it consistently. In Simons's Daily Express review, she characterised the album as Ray's "song picture" representing "the gentler aspects of British life". She further suggested that its material could work well as a stage musical.

In his September 1968 preview of the twelve-track edition for NME, Altham reviewed the album favourably. He was especially fond of the title track, which he thought could have made it to No. 1 in the UK had it been issued as a single. Having already published Altham's review of the original album, NME did not publish a review of the expanded edition in November. Altham reflected decades later that while he liked the album on first listening and thought it was musically and aesthetically interesting, he worried at the time that it was a risky release for the Kinks since it was "a bit too twee". He elaborated that compared to the band's earlier work, it was "missing [something] in terms of dynamics ... it didn't seem to have that anger, the kind of attack that Dave used to bring".

=== United States ===
Village Green was especially well received by US critics. The album was not covered in major US trade magazines like Billboard or Cash Box but received extensive coverage from non-mainstream sources. America's new underground rock press began embracing the Kinks after the January 1968 release of Something Else, a trend which continued following the release of Village Green.

Reviews of Village Green were slow to appear after its February 1969 release; the only immediate response was a short piece in the 27 February issue of New York City's Village Voice, in which Johanna Schier provided a mixed assessment. Schier described it as "a good album, not a great one", hampered by its attempts to extend in too many directions. She concluded that the album's best moments were when it approached the "[m]usical violence" which characterised the Kinks' earliest singles, though she still found the new music too subdued by comparison. In the 10 April issue of the Voice, Robert Christgau countered Schier's review in his regular Rock&Roll& column. He instead concluded that the album was the best of the year so far. While Schier suggested that the band should have continued recording tracks with the raunch of "You Really Got Me", Christgau countered that the band necessarily progressed beyond their original sound, just as the Beatles never returned to recording songs like their earliest singles. He declared "Last of the Steam-Powered Trains" the album's most memorable song, placing it in the context of the rock and roll revival, and expected it would have been the lead single had there been enough demand.

I think the Kinks should go to America – there's been a good reaction to our latest album [Village Green] and singles over there. ... In many ways the Americans seem more sympathetic – especially on the West Coast. The people there seem more interested in things like the Village Green Preservation Society and Tudor houses and cricket – more so, even, than in [England]. They're not as bogged down and restricted as English people.

— Ray Davies, May 1969

A review of the album by Paul Williams, the former editor of Crawdaddy! magazine, served as the lead review in the 14 June 1969 issue of Rolling Stone magazine. In addition to praising the album, Williams described Ray as a genius who "makes statements" and "says the sort of stuff that makes you delighted just to know that someone would say stuff like that". Comparing the Kinks to French composer Erik Satie, Williams concluded that "only genius could hit me so directly, destroy me and rebuild so completely". Williams's review subsequently became the most influential piece ever written about the Kinks, helping establish a cult following for the band.

A review in Circus, formerly the teen magazine Hullaballoo, stated that though the Kinks were "backdated" and "cut off from the mainstream of pop progression", Village Green indicated their continued originality. A reviewer in Boston's new underground paper Fusion similarly wrote that despite the increasingly bad press the band were facing, Village Green showed their persistence. The album was also reviewed in university newspapers. Musician John Mendelsohn reviewed it for UCLA's paper the Daily Bruin, counting it as his favourite LP since the Who's 1967 album The Who Sell Out and predicted that it would be one of the best in 1969. The reviewer in Caltech's paper instead disparaged the album as "schmaltz rock", being "without imagination, poorly arranged, and a bad copy of the Beatles".

== Retrospective assessment ==
Retrospective professional ratings
Review scores
Source	Rating
AllMusic	5/5 stars
Blender	5/5 stars
The Encyclopedia of Popular Music	5/5 stars
MusicHound Rock	4.5/5
The New Rolling Stone Album Guide	5/5 stars
Pitchfork	9.5/10
Sputnikmusic	4/5
The Times	5/5 stars
Tiny Mix Tapes	5/5 marks
Uncut	9/10

Retrospective commentators often regard Village Green as the Kinks' best work. Critic Rob Sheffield writes the album is likely the band's strongest album on a song-by-song basis, while Rogan writes it is "[t]he crowning achievement of the Kinks' career and their best album by some distance". Stephen Thomas Erlewine of AllMusic writes that the album's subdued performances emphasise the songwriting to make it feel more like Ray's solo project than a Kinks album. He suggests that, despite the album's calm sensibility, it includes "endless layers of musical and lyrical innovation".

Village Green has often been reassessed by commentators as Ray's creative peak. Dylan Montanari of the website Spectrum Culture writes that the album places Ray's songwriting ability among the best of 1960s, such as the Beatles, Bob Dylan and Joni Mitchell. He contends that Ray's unique skill is in understanding the nostalgia one will later feel about the present moment and a recognition that individuals often craft themselves on how they want to look to their future selves. Charles Ubaghs of webzine Tiny Mix Tapes writes the album is a "piece of near perfect pop perfection repeatedly imitated and arguably never bettered". He argues that its lyrical content is furthered by the arrangements which mix folk with music hall, elevating it from an "odd ball piece of rose tinted British nostalgia, to a rightfully regarded piece of song writing brilliance".

Listeners in the 21st century often interpret Village Green as applying to modern issues. Relevant themes include disparaging the increasing modernisation of cities and destruction of "little shops", satirising those who photograph mundane moments, exploring the emptiness of celebrity culture and being suggestive of environmentalism. Jeff Slate of Esquire magazine writes that while some late 1960s records have come to sound dated, Village Green has remained modern sounding and accessible decades after its release, something he attributes to its simple and straightforward arrangements. Adding to its success, he writes, was the band's collaborative nature during its recording and their retention of some of their original garage rock sound. Michael Gallucci of the website Ultimate Classic Rock similarly writes that Village Green has maintained relevance decades after its release by sounding "both timeless and of its time", its pastoral sounds partly originating from the Summer of Love while its exploration of music hall and Victorian mores being part of a broader yearning for the English tradition. Morgan Enos of Billboard writes that rather than being bitter or anachronistic, the album's tracks "burst with unique, giddy joy", only becoming more relevant in the "more crowded, convoluted and bleak" 21st century.

Though the term did not exist at the time of Village Green's release, retrospective commentators identify the album as a candidate for the first concept album. The 2001 edition of The New Grove Dictionary of Music and Musicians calls it "one of the few aesthetically successful concept albums", and Ann Powers of Blender magazine suggests the album achieves the difficult task of being "a subtle concept album", its focus being everyday Britons. Author Nick Hasted compares the album's cohesiveness to the consistent melancholy which runs through Sinatra's 1958 album Frank Sinatra Sings for Only the Lonely, while John Mendelsohn writes it is more unified by the sound of its music than in its lyrical themes. Ray later suggested the album to be "not a storyline, it's an emotional thread", a sentiment echoed by several commentators. Erlewine writes that while Something Else first displayed Ray's penchant for nostalgia, Village Green instead served as his "manifesto" on the disappearance of old English traditions, both real and imagined. Author Clinton Heylin writes the twelve-track edition of the album displayed more unity, while the songs added in October 1968 – in particular, "Last of the Steam-Powered Trains", "Big Sky" and "All of My Friends Were There" – helped to "kill the album conceptually". Enos, by contrast, writes the album's format of separate vignettes allows for each to be enjoyed either separately or together.

== Influence and legacy ==
Professional ratings
50th Anniversary Super Deluxe
Review scores
Source	Rating
American Songwriter	4.5/5 stars
Rolling Stone	5/5 stars
Uncut	8/10

In the decades after its release, Village Green developed a cult following. The album's themes appealed to English songwriters, and Stephen Thomas Erlewine writes its "defiantly British sensibilities became the foundation of generations of British guitar pop". Among the album's earliest English supporters was Pete Townshend of the Who, who later described it as Ray's "masterwork" and "his Sgt. Pepper". (Note: Dave later said that Townshend tried to acquire the album's original master tapes, and he also suggested that Townsend incorporated the opening riff of "Johnny Thunder" into his own compositions. Miller writes the riff can possibly be heard in the Who's songs "Overture" and "Go to the Mirror!" from their May 1969 album, Tommy.) The album's themes resonated with British bands in the mid-1970s who rose to prominence during the new wave movement, like the Jam, XTC, Squeeze and Madness. In the 1990s, as Britpop groups sought to emphasise their Englishness through their music, Village Green inspired bands like Blur, Oasis and Pulp. Noel Gallagher of Oasis and Blur's guitarist Graham Coxon each named the album as one of their favourites. It has been a major influence on Blur's principal songwriter Damon Albarn, who expressed similar sentiments of nostalgia for a past England on Blur's albums Modern Life is Rubbish (1993) and Parklife (1994). (Note: During Blur's 1992 American tour, Albarn spent time listening to the Kinks and found that he "started to miss really simple things [about England]". John Harris of The Guardian suggests that the Kinks' influence is apparent on several of Albarn's compositions, such as "Tracy Jacks" from Parklife, which features a George Bowlingesque character. Gallagher compares "Big Sky" to Blur's 1994 single "Parklife".)

Driven in part by its influence on other artists, Village Green experienced a broader critical and commercial resurgence in the 1990s. The Kinks' emerging status in the 1990s as figures of the 1960s was propelled by the newfound popularity of Village Green. In America, the album attracted the attention of indie rock bands and Anglophiles, who covered its songs extensively in the late 1980s and 1990s. (Note: American artists who covered the album's songs included Matthew Sweet ("Big Sky"), Jason Falkner ("Wicked Annabella"), Young Fresh Fellows ("Picture Book") and Yo La Tengo ("Big Sky" and "Animal Farm"), among others.) Other artists incorporated its elements into their own work. (Note: The album's format as a collection of character studies influenced American indie pop band of Montreal in the writing of their 1999 album The Gay Parade. Electric Light Orchestra used the drum and piano intro of "Do You Remember Walter" on their 1978 single "Mr. Blue Sky" and Green Day used the riff of "Picture Book" on their 2000 single "Warning".)

Along with the rest of the Kinks' catalogue, the album was first remastered on CD in 1998. In contrast to the band's other 1998 reissues, Village Green included no bonus material but instead consisted of the mono version of the fifteen-track edition, the twelve-track edition in stereo and the mono single version of "Days". Sanctuary Records reissued the album in 2004 as an expanded 3-CD box set, joining stereo and mono versions of the album and compiling many of the sessions' songs as bonus tracks. To coincide with the album's 50th anniversary, Sony BMG and Legacy issued a "Super Deluxe" edition on 26 October 2018. The reissue received critical acclaim, though several reviewers remarked that most of the interesting bonus material had already been included on previous reissues. (Note: Attributed to multiple references:) The 2018 release resulted in the album's first appearance on the UK Albums Chart, where it charted for one week at No. 47. It also charted in Belgium, Spain and Germany. (Note: Attributed to multiple references:) The album has since become the Kinks' best-selling studio album in the UK. The British Phonographic Industry certified the album silver in 2008 followed by gold in 2018 (indicating 60,000 and 100,000 sales, respectively).

Ian MacDonald writes that in contrast to the "Englishness" of the Kinks' late 1960s work, the band's sound after their US performance ban was lifted shifted almost immediately back to being influenced by American acts, something he thinks was apparent on their next album, Arthur (Or the Decline and Fall of the British Empire).

=== Rankings ===
Village Green appears on professional rankings of the best albums. The album was voted No. 221 in the first edition of English writer Colin Larkin's All Time Top 1000 Albums (1994). It placed No. 171 and No. 141 in Larkin's updated second and third editions, published in 1998 and 2000, respectively. In 2003, Rolling Stone placed it at No. 255 in the magazine's list of the "500 Greatest Albums of All Time". When the list was updated in 2012 and 2020, it was placed at No. 258 and No. 384, respectively. Rolling Stone also ranked it No. 28 on its "50 Greatest Concept Albums of All Time" list in 2022. In Pitchfork and Paste's lists of the best albums of the 1960s, they placed Village Green at No. 27 and No. 18, respectively.

== Track listing ==
=== UK and US edition ===
All tracks are written by Ray Davies.

Side one

1. "The Village Green Preservation Society" – 2:49
2. "Do You Remember Walter" – 2:28
3. "Picture Book" – 2:38
4. "Johnny Thunder" – 2:33
5. "Last of the Steam-Powered Trains" – 4:03
6. "Big Sky" – 2:49
7. "Sitting by the Riverside" – 2:21

Side two

1. "Animal Farm" – 2:57
2. "Village Green" – 2:08
3. "Starstruck" – 2:22
4. "Phenomenal Cat" – 2:37
5. "All of My Friends Were There" – 2:23
6. "Wicked Annabella" – 2:40
7. "Monica" – 2:13
8. "People Take Pictures of Each Other" – 2:10

Notes

- The original release included four discrepancies between the titles listed on the album sleeve and those on the LP's label. Other than "Phenomenal Cat", the titles are listed above as they were on the original sleeve. (Note: On the label, "The Village Green Preservation Society" is without the The, "Do You Remember Walter" includes a question mark and "Last of the Steam-Powered Trains" has a The in front. "Phenomenal Cat" was misspelled on the sleeve as "Phenominal Cat".)
- Track lengths according to AllMusic.

=== European edition ===
All tracks are written by Ray Davies.

Side one

1. "The Village Green Preservation Society" – 2:49
2. "Do You Remember Walter" – 2:25
3. "Picture Book" – 2:36
4. "Johnny Thunder" – 2:30
5. "Monica" – 2:15
6. "Days" – 2:52

Side two

1. "Village Green" – 2:08
2. "Mr. Songbird" – 2:25
3. "Wicked Annabella" – 2:41
4. "Starstruck" – 2:20
5. "Phenomenal Cat" – 2:36
6. "People Take Pictures of Each Other" – 2:23

Notes

- The track listing above was originally intended for UK release but was instead issued in Sweden, Norway, France, Italy and New Zealand. The 50th anniversary deluxe box set included a replica of the Swedish LP.
- Track lengths according to AllMusic.

== Personnel ==
According to band researcher Doug Hinman, except where noted:

The Kinks

- Ray Davies – lead vocals, guitars, keyboards, harmonica ("Last of the Steam-Powered Trains"); producer, mixer
- Dave Davies – backing vocals, guitars; lead vocals ("Wicked Annabella")
- Pete Quaife – backing vocals, bass guitar
- Mick Avory – drums
- Unidentified (played by the Kinks) – handclaps, tambourine

Additional musicians

- Rasa Davies – backing vocals
- Nicky Hopkins – keyboards
- David Whitaker – orchestral arrangement ("Animal Farm" and "Village Green")
- Unidentified – congas ("Monica") (Note: Miller writes "Monica" includes congas, but he does not specify who played them. The Kinks' road manager Ken Jones played congas on "Wonderboy", which was recorded in March 1968 during the Village Green sessions.)
- Unidentified session musicians – oboe, cello, viola and piccolo ("Village Green"), string section ("Animal Farm")

Additional personnel

- Brian Humphries – engineering
- Alan MacKenzie – engineering
- John Prosser – photography (front cover and gatefold)
- Shel Talmy – producer ("Village Green")
- Barrie Wentzell – photography (rear image)

== Charts and certifications ==
=== Charts ===
Reissue weekly chart performance
Year	Chart	Peak position
2018
2018	Belgian Albums (Ultratop Flanders)	131
2018	Belgian Albums (Ultratop Wallonia)	124
2018	German Albums (Offizielle Top 100)	84
2018	Spanish Albums (Promusicae)	50
2018	UK Albums (OCC)	47
2019	Belgian Albums (Ultratop Flanders)	86

=== Certifications ===
Certifications for The Kinks Are the Village Green Preservation Society
Region	Certification	Certified units/sales
United Kingdom (BPI)	Gold	100,000^{‡}
^{‡} Sales+streaming figures based on certification alone.

== See also ==
- Preservation Act 1, 1973 concept album by the Kinks
- Preservation Act 2, 1974 concept album by the Kinks
- British Invasion
- British rock
- Deep England
- Middle England

== Bibliography ==
=== Books ===
- Crick, Bernard (1980). George Orwell: A Life. London: Secker & Warburg. ISBN 978-0-316-16112-1 – via the Internet Archive.
- Davies, Dave (1996). Kink: An Autobiography. New York City: Hyperion. ISBN 978-0-7868-6149-1 – via the Internet Archive.
- Davies, Ray (1995). X-Ray: The Unauthorised Autobiography. Woodstock, New York: Overlook Press. ISBN 978-0-87951-611-6 – via the Internet Archive.
- Dawson, Julian (2011). And on Piano ... Nicky Hopkins: The Extraordinary Life of Rock's Greatest Session Man. San Francisco, California: Backstage Press. ISBN 978-0-9844362-2-4.
- DeRogatis, Jim (2003). Turn on Your Mind: Four Decades of Great Psychedelic Rock. Milwaukee, Wisconsin: Hal Leonard Corporation. ISBN 978-0-634-05548-5 – via Google Books.
- Doyle, Mark (2020). The Kinks: Songs of the Semi-Detached. London: Reaktion Books. ISBN 978-1-78914-254-9 – via Google Books.
- The Editors of Rolling Stone (1971). The Rolling Stone Record Review. New York City: Pocket Books. ISBN 978-0-671-78531-4 – via Google Books.
- Elnaggar, Jennette; Wilcox, Heather, eds. (2022). Music: The Definitive Visual History (Second ed.). New York City: Dorling Kindersley Limited. ISBN 978-0-7440-7385-0 – via Google Books.
- Faulk, Barry J. (2010). British Rock Modernism, 1967–1977: The Story of Music Hall in Rock. Farnham: Ashgate. ISBN 978-1-4094-1190-1 – via the Internet Archive.
- Fleiner, Carey (2017a). The Kinks: A Thoroughly English Phenomenon. Lanham, Maryland: Rowman & Littlefield. ISBN 978-1-4422-3542-7 – via Google Books.
- Gildart, Keith (2013). Images of England Through Popular Music: Class, Youth and Rock 'n' Roll, 1955–1976. Basingstoke: Palgrave Macmillan. ISBN 978-1-349-28582-2 – via Google Books.
- Harris, John (2003). The Last Party: Britpop, Blair and the Demise of English Rock. London: Fourth Estate. ISBN 0-00-713472-X – via Google Books.
- Hasted, Nick (2011). The Story of the Kinks: You Really Got Me. London: Omnibus Press. ISBN 978-1-84938-660-9 – via the Internet Archive.
- Hawkins, Stan (2017). The British Pop Dandy: Masculinity, Popular Music and Culture. New York City: Routledge. ISBN 978-0-7546-5858-0 – via Google Books.
- Heylin, Clinton (2012). All the Madmen: Barrett, Bowie, Drake, Pink Floyd, the Kinks, the Who & a Journey to the Dark Side of English Rock. London: Constable. ISBN 978-1-84901-880-7 – via the Internet Archive.
- Hinman, Doug; Brabazon, Jason (1994). You Really Got Me: An Illustrated World Discography of the Kinks, 1964–1993. Rumford, Rhode Island: Doug Hinman. ISBN 978-0-9641005-1-0.
- Hinman, Doug (2004). The Kinks: All Day and All of the Night: Day-by-Day Concerts, Recordings and Broadcasts, 1961–1996. San Francisco, California: Backbeat Books. ISBN 978-0-87930-765-3.
- Hinman, Doug; Sandoval, Andrew (2026). The Kinks: All Day and All of the Night: The Day-by-Day Story Pt. 1: 1940–1971. Beatland Books.
- Irvin, Jim; McLear, Colin, eds. (2003). The Mojo Collection: The Ultimate Music Companion. Edinburgh: Canongate Books. ISBN 978-1-84195-438-7 – via the Internet Archive.
- Jovanovic, Rob (2013). God Save the Kinks: A Biography. London: Aurum Press. ISBN 978-1-84513-671-0 – via the Internet Archive.
- Kitts, Thomas M. (2008). Ray Davies: Not Like Everybody Else. New York City: Routledge. ISBN 978-0-415-97768-5 – via the Internet Archive.
- Larkin, Colin, ed. (1994). All Time Top 1000 Albums (1st ed.). London: Guinness Publishing. ISBN 0-85112-786-X – via the Internet Archive.
- Larkin, Colin, ed. (1998). All Time Top 1000 Albums (2nd ed.). London: Virgin Books. ISBN 0-7535-0258-5 – via the Internet Archive.
- Larkin, Colin, ed. (2000). All Time Top 1000 Albums (3rd ed.). London: Virgin Books. ISBN 0-7535-0493-6.
- Larkin, Colin, ed. (2011). The Encyclopedia of Popular Music (Fifth concise ed.). London: Omnibus Press. ISBN 978-0-85712-595-8 – via Google Books.
- MacDonald, Ian (2007). Revolution in the Head: The Beatles' Records and the Sixties (Third ed.). Chicago Review Press. ISBN 978-1-55652-733-3 – via the Internet Archive.
- Marr, Andrew (2009). A History of Modern Britain. London: Macmillan Publishers. ISBN 978-1-4299-3101-4 – via Google Books.
- Marten, Neville; Hudson, Jeff (2007). The Kinks: A Very English Band. London: Bobcat Books. ISBN 978-0-8256-7351-1 – via the Internet Archive.
- Massey, Howard (2015). The Great British Recording Studios. Milwaukee, Wisconsin: Hal Leonard Corporation. ISBN 978-1-4950-3533-3 – via Google Books.
- Matijas-Mecca, Christian (2020). Listen to Psychedelic Rock! Exploring a Musical Genre. Santa Barbara, California: ABC-CLIO. ISBN 978-1-4408-6198-7 – via Google Books.
- Mendelsohn, John (1985). The Kinks Kronikles. New York City: Quill. ISBN 978-0-688-02983-8 – via the Internet Archive.
- Miles, Barry (1980). The Rolling Stones: An Illustrated Discography. London: Omnibus Press. ISBN 978-0-86001-762-2 – via the Internet Archive.
- Miles, Barry (2001). The Beatles Diary Volume 1: The Beatles Years. London: Omnibus Press. ISBN 978-0-7119-8308-3 – via Google Books.
- Miller, Andy (2003). The Kinks Are the Village Green Preservation Society. 33⅓ series. New York City: Bloomsbury Academic. ISBN 978-0-8264-1498-4 – via Google Books.
- Moore, Allan F. (2001). Rock: The Primary Text: Developing a Musicology of Rock (Second ed.). Aldershot: Ashgate Publishing. ISBN 978-0-7546-0298-9 – via the Internet Archive.
- Morra, Irene (2014). Britishness, Popular Music, and National Identity: The Making of Modern Britain. New York City: Routledge. ISBN 978-1-135-04895-2 – via Google Books.
- Roberts, Michael James (2014). Tell Tchaikovsky the News: Rock 'n' Roll, the Labor Question, and the Musicians' Union, 1942-1968. Durham, North Carolina: Duke University Press. ISBN 978-0-8223-7883-9 – via the Internet Archive.
- Rodriguez, Robert (2012). Revolver: How the Beatles Re-Imagined Rock 'n' Roll. Montclair: Backbeat Books. ISBN 978-1-61713-009-0 – via the Internet Archive.
- Rogan, Johnny (1984). The Kinks: The Sound and the Fury. London: Elm Tree Books. ISBN 0-241-11308-3.
- Rogan, Johnny (1998). The Complete Guide to the Music of the Kinks. London: Omnibus Press. ISBN 978-0-7119-6314-6.
- Rogan, Johnny (2015). Ray Davies: A Complicated Life. London: The Bodley Head. ISBN 978-1-84792-317-2 – via the Internet Archive.
- Sadie, Stanley, ed. (2001). The New Grove Dictionary of Music and Musicians (Second ed.). London: Macmillan Publishers Ltd. ISBN 978-1-56159-239-5.
- Savage, Jon (1984). The Kinks: The Official Biography. London: Faber and Faber. ISBN 978-0-571-13407-6 – via the Internet Archive.
- Schaffner, Nicholas (1982). The British Invasion: From the First Wave to the New Wave. New York City: McGraw Hill. ISBN 978-0-07-055089-6 – via Google Books.
- Segretto, Mike (2014). The Who FAQ: All That's Left to Know About Fifty Years of Maximum R&B. Milwaukee, Wisconsin: Backbeat Books. ISBN 978-1-4803-9253-3 – via Google Books.
- Segretto, Mike (2022). 33 1/3 Revolutions Per Minute: A Critical Trip Through the Rock LP Era, 1955–1999. Lanham, Maryland: Rowman & Littlefield. ISBN 978-1-4930-6460-1 – via Google Books.
- Thompson, Gordon (2008). Please Please Me: Sixties British Pop, Inside Out. New York City: Oxford University Press. ISBN 978-0-19-971555-8 – via Google Books.

=== Book chapters ===
- Alleman, Steve (2002). "'The Hard Way' or 'Something Better Beginning' – An Alternate View of The Kinks' Artistic Development". In Kitts, Thomas M. (ed.). Living on a Thin Line: Crossing Aesthetic Borders with The Kinks. Rumford, Rhode Island: Desolation Angel Books. pp. 44–51. ISBN 0-9641005-4-1.
- Barry, Eric (2015). "Mono in the Stereo Age". In Théberge, Paul; Devine, Kyle; Everett, Tom (eds.). Living Stereo: Histories and Cultures of Multichannel Sound. New York City: Bloomsbury Academic. pp. 125–146. ISBN 978-1-62356-665-4 – via Google Books.
- Carroll, Barbara (2002). "Two Views of Paradise: The Inner Geography of Ray Davies and Brian Wilson". In Kitts, Thomas M. (ed.). Living on a Thin Line: Crossing Aesthetic Borders with The Kinks. Rumford, Rhode Island: Desolation Angel Books. pp. 165–170. ISBN 0-9641005-4-1.
- Catlin, Roger (1996). "The Kinks". In Graff, Gary (ed.). MusicHound Rock: The Essential Album Guide. Detroit, Michigan: Visible Ink Press. pp. 390–391. ISBN 978-0-7876-1037-1 – via the Internet Archive.
- Costambeys-Kempczynski, Raphael (2014). "Preservation Society". In Harris, Trevor; O’Brien Castro, Monia (eds.). Preserving the Sixties: Britain and the 'Decade of Protest'. Houndmills: Palgrave Macmillan. pp. 173–191. ISBN 978-1-137-37410-3 – via Google Books.
- Field, Elizabeth (2002). "Skin and Bone, Tea and Scones: Food and Drink Imagery in The Kinks' Music, 1964–1997". In Kitts, Thomas M. (ed.). Living on a Thin Line: Crossing Aesthetic Borders with The Kinks. Rumford, Rhode Island: Desolation Angel Books. pp. 61–67. ISBN 0-9641005-4-1.
- Finler, Joel W. (2001). "Color and Widescreen". In Karney, Robyn (ed.). Cinema: Year by Year, 1894–2001. London: Dorling Kindersley. pp. 488–691. ISBN 978-0-7513-3428-9.
- Fitzgerald, Jon (2000). "Lennon–McCartney and the Early British Invasion, 1964–6". In Inglis, Ian (ed.). The Beatles, Popular Music and Society: A Thousand Voices. New York City: St. Martin's Press. pp. 53–85. ISBN 978-0-312-22235-2 – via the Internet Archive.
- Fleiner, Carey (2017b). "'Rosy, Won't You Please Come Home': Family, home and cultural identity in the music of Ray Davies and the Kinks". In Brooks, Lee; Donnelly, Mark; Mills, Richard (eds.). Mad Dogs and Englishness: Popular Music and English Identities. New York City: Bloomsbury Academic. pp. 19–35. ISBN 978-1-5013-1127-7 – via Google Books.
- Kitts, Thomas M., ed. (2002a). "Chronology". Living on a Thin Line: Crossing Aesthetic Borders with The Kinks. Rumford, Rhode Island: Desolation Angel Books. pp. 9–24. ISBN 0-9641005-4-1.
- Kitts, Thomas M. (2002b). "'... in the grand [and not so grand] tradition': Film, Theatre, and the Triumph of 20th Century Man". In Kitts, Thomas M. (ed.). Living on a Thin Line: Crossing Aesthetic Borders with The Kinks. Rumford, Rhode Island: Desolation Angel Books. pp. 131–142. ISBN 0-9641005-4-1.
- Marotta, Joseph G. (2002). "The Loss of Identity and the Myth of Edenic Return in Ray Davies". In Kitts, Thomas M. (ed.). Living on a Thin Line: Crossing Aesthetic Borders with The Kinks. Rumford, Rhode Island: Desolation Angel Books. pp. 68–77. ISBN 0-9641005-4-1.
- Polito, Robert (2004). "Bits of Me Scattered Everywhere: Ray Davies and the Kinks". In Weisbard, Eric (ed.). This is Pop: In Search of the Elusive at Experience Music Project. Cambridge, Massachusetts: Harvard University Press. pp. 119–144. ISBN 978-0-674-01321-6 – via the Internet Archive.
- Prichard, Matthew (2007). "The Kinks, or a Redefinition of English National Identity". In Crone, Rosalind; Gange, David; Jones, Katy (eds.). New Perspectives in British Cultural History. Newcastle upon Tyne: Cambridge Scholars Publishing. pp. 266–274. ISBN 978-1-5275-6697-2 – via Google Books.
- Sheffield, Rob (2004). "The Kinks". In Brackett, Nathan; Hoard, Christian (eds.). The New Rolling Stone Album Guide. New York City: Simon & Schuster. pp. 458–460. ISBN 978-0-7432-0169-8 – via the Internet Archive.
- Sullivan, Patricia Gordon (2002). "'Let's Have a Go at It': The British Musical Hall and The Kinks". In Kitts, Thomas M. (ed.). Living on a Thin Line: Crossing Aesthetic Borders with The Kinks. Rumford, Rhode Island: Desolation Angel Books. pp. 80–99. ISBN 0-9641005-4-1.
- Rayes, Ken (2002). "The Village Green and The Great Gatsby – Two Views of Preservation". In Kitts, Thomas M. (ed.). Living on a Thin Line: Crossing Aesthetic Borders with The Kinks. Rumford, Rhode Island: Desolation Angel Books. pp. 153–164. ISBN 0-9641005-4-1.
- Saunders, Graham (2010). "Sarah Kane: Cool Britannia's Reluctant Feminist". In Hadley, Louisa; Ho, Elizabeth (eds.). Thatcher and After: Margaret Thatcher and Her Afterlife in Contemporary Culture. New York City: Palgrave Macmillan. pp. 199–220. ISBN 978-0-230-28316-9 – via Google Books.

=== Liner notes ===
- Anon.[a] (1968). The Kinks Are the Village Green Preservation Society (Liner notes). The Kinks. Pye Records. NPL 18233.
- Davies, Ray (2002). This Is Where I Belong: The Songs Of Ray Davies & The Kinks (Liner notes). Various artists. Praxis Records. RCD 10621.
- Doggett, Peter (1998). The Kinks Are the Village Green Preservation Society (Liner notes). The Kinks. Essential. ESM CD 481.
- Miller, Andrew; Sandoval, Andrew (2004). The Kinks Are the Village Green Preservation Society (Liner notes). The Kinks. Sanctuary Records. SMETD 102.
- Neill, Andy (2018). "The Kinks Are the Village Green Preservation Society". The Kinks Are the Village Green Preservation Society (50th Anniversary) (Liner notes). The Kinks. BMG, ABKCO. pp. 5–26. BMGAA09USBOX.
- Sandoval, Andrew (2018). The Kinks Are the Village Green Preservation Society (50th Anniversary) (Liner notes). The Kinks. BMG, ABKCO. BMGAA09USBOX.

=== Magazine, newspaper and journal articles ===
- Alterman, Loraine (18 December 1969). "Who Let the Kinks In?". Rolling Stone. No. 48.
- Altham, Keith (21 September 1968). "Kinks Reminiscing on the Village Green" (PDF). New Musical Express. p. 10 – via WorldRadioHistory.com.
- Anon.[b] (21 September 1968). "Pye Host 19 Countries At 9th Int'l Meet" (PDF). Cash Box. pp. 67, 73–74 – via WorldRadioHistory.com.
- Anon.[c] (28 September 1968). "Pye Records Presents an Autumn Collection" (PDF). Melody Maker. p. 23 – via WorldRadioHistory.com.
- Anon.[d] (23 November 1968). "Album Reviews". Disc and Music Echo. p. 2.
- Anon.[a] (25 January 1969). "Cash Box Record Reviews" (PDF). Cash Box. p. 22 – via WorldRadioHistory.com.
- Anon.[b] (1 February 1969). "Spotlight Singles" (PDF). Billboard. p. 79 – via WorldRadioHistory.com.
- Anon.[c] (28 June 1969). "Basic Album Inventory" (PDF). Cash Box. p. 54 – via WorldRadioHistory.com.
- Bailey, Andrew (20 June 1974). "Can Anybody Depend on the Kinks? Yeah". Rolling Stone. No. 163. p. 12.
- Baxter-Moore, Nick (May 2006). "'This Is Where I Belong'—Identity, Social Class, and the Nostalgic Englishness of Ray Davies and the Kinks". Popular Music and Society. 29 (2): 145–165. doi:10.1080/03007760600559989. S2CID 191625359.
- Boltwood, Derek (10 May 1969). "Kinks' 'Bum' & the BBC!" (PDF). Record Mirror. p. 5 – via WorldRadioHistory.com.
- Breyer, Mark; Vittenson, Rik (March 1976). "Kinks Konfessions: Ray Davies Revealed". Crawdaddy. p. 8.
- Cavanagh, David (5 May 2022). "A Far Away Place". Mojo. Mojo: The Collectors' Series: Mod Icons – Part Two: The Kinks – via Apple News+.
- Christgau, Robert (10 April 1969). "Rock&Roll&: Kinks Kountry". The Village Voice. Vol. XIV, no. 26. pp. 31, 36–37. Archived from the original on 16 December 2021 – via robertchristgau.com.
- Cott, Jonathan (26 November 1970). "Q&A: Afternoon Tea With Ray Davies". Rolling Stone. No. 71. pp. 30–31. Archived from the original on 8 February 2022 – via RollingStone.com.
- Dawbarn, Bob (16 April 1966). "Ray – The Patriot Kink". Melody Maker. p. 3 – via the Internet Archive.
- Dawbarn, Bob (30 November 1968). "Looking back with the Kinks: Ray Davies explains The Village Green Preservation Society" (PDF). Melody Maker. p. 8 – via WorldRadioHistory.com.
- The Editors of Rolling Stone (11 December 2003). "The 500 Greatest Albums of All Time". Rolling Stone. No. 937. pp. 83–178.
- Farmer, Bob (8 July 1967). "Kink Goes Solo!" (PDF). Disc and Music Echo. p. 16 – via WorldRadioHistory.com.
- Gelbart, Matthew (2003). "Persona and Voice in the Kinks' Songs of the Late 1960s". Journal of the Royal Musical Association. 128 (2): 200–241. doi:10.1093/jrma/128.2.200. ISSN 0269-0403. JSTOR 3557496.
- Henshaw, Laurie (24 August 1968). "Enter Ray Davies, the record producer" (PDF). Melody Maker. p. 7 – via WorldRadioHistory.com.
- Hyland, Mark (25 October 1969). "In the groove". Schenectady Gazette. p. 10 – via Google Books.
- Jones, Peter (November 1968). "Kinks hailed at last in America" (PDF). Beat Instrumental. Vol. 3, no. 67. p. 38 – via WorldRadioHistory.com.
- Jopling, Norman (4 February 1967). "Ray Davies on Holly, & the rocking Kinks" (PDF). Record Mirror. p. 3 – via WorldRadioHistory.com.
- Kot, Greg (1 September 2000). "Chicago's best new recorded music". Chicago Tribune. sec. 7, pp. 19, 37 – via Newspapers.com.
- Lupro, Michael Mooradian (May 2006). "Preserving the Old Ways, Protecting the New: Post-War British Urban Planning in The Kinks Are the Village Green Preservation Society". Popular Music and Society. 29 (2): 189–200. doi:10.1080/03007760600560094. ISSN 0300-7766. S2CID 144597530.

McKay, Alastair (December 2018). "The Kinks – The Kinks Are The Village Green Preservation Society". Uncut. p. 43 – via the Internet Archive.

- Mendelsohn, John (9 April 1969). "The Kinks: The Kinks Are The Village Green Preservation Society (Reprise); Cream: Goodbye Cream (Atco)". Daily Bruin – via Rock's Backpages.
- Morisset, Jean-Pierre (May 2006). "Pete Quaife, interviewed by Jean-Pierre Morisset". Jukebox magazine. No. 230.
- Neill, Andy (February 2000). "The Great Lost Kinks Album". Record Collector. No. 246. pp. 46–49 – via the Internet Archive.

Nolan, Hugh (3 August 1968). "Suddenly the Kinks are Feeling Old" (PDF). Disc and Music Echo. p. 9 – via WorldRadioHistory.com.

- Roberts, Randall (February 1999). "Life's Rich Pageant". CMJ New Music Monthly. p. 12 – via Google Books.
- Schier, Johanna (27 February 1969). "Riffs". The Village Voice. Vol. XIV, no. 20. pp. 33–34. Archived from the original on 12 October 2022 – via Google Books.
- Walsh, Alan (12 August 1967). "'I'm Not Good Enough to Go Solo!': Dave Davies tells Alan Walsh" (PDF). Melody Maker. p. 9 – via WorldRadioHistory.com.
- Williams, Paul (14 June 1969). "The Kinks: The Village Green Preservation Society". Rolling Stone. No. 35. Archived from the original on 3 April 2007 – via RollingStone.com.
- Wilson, Tony (3 August 1968). "The loneliness of the far-sighted songwriter" (PDF). Melody Maker. p. 9 – via WorldRadioHistory.com.
