= People Take Pictures of Each Other =

1968 song by the Kinks

Song by the Kinks

from the album The Kinks Are the Village Green Preservation Society
- Released: 22 November 1968
- Recorded: July 1968
- Studio: Pye, London
- Length: 2:22 (stereo with coda); 2:10 (stereo without coda); 2:14 (mono)
- Label: Pye
- Songwriter: Ray Davies
- Producer: Ray Davies

Official audio
- "People Take Pictures of Each Other" on YouTube

"People Take Pictures of Each Other" is a song by the English rock band the Kinks from their sixth studio album, The Kinks Are the Village Green Preservation Society (1968). Written and sung by Ray Davies, the song was recorded in July 1968. The song features a breathless vocal from Davies as well as harpsichord and piano from Nicky Hopkins, which was likely the last contribution he ever made to a Kinks recording.

Davies was inspired to write the song after attending a wedding and finding it strange that the bride and groom photographed one another. The lyrics satirise the absurdity of using photographs to prove one's existence. Retrospective commentators often describe the song as the darker opposite of "Picture Book", another song on Village Green about photography. Others comment that its status as closing track serves to summarise several of the album's themes. The Kinks performed "People Take Pictures of Each Other" in concert in 1973, and it has since been covered by the Dig.

== Background and composition ==
I was at a wedding. [...] and they all stood there and they took a picture. And then she got the camera and took a picture of him ... and he got the camera and took a picture of her ... that's strange. That's where that came about. I just got the line and then built on that.

— Ray Davies, 1976

Ray Davies was inspired to write "People Take Pictures of Each Other" after he attended a wedding and saw the newlywed couple photograph one another. The song's lyrics satirise the absurdity of using photographs to prove one's existence, and Davies stated in his 1994 autobiography that its lyrics sum up how he feels about "the world of photographic images", which he thinks both encourage nostalgia and mislead the viewer by providing a narrow perspective.

Author Johnny Rogan describes the song's sound as a cross between a Cossack dance and a Greek wedding, something he relates to its original wedding inspiration. Like several of Davies's late 1960s compositions, such as "Autumn Almanac" (1967), the song features a sing-along format during its choruses, a feature Miller relates to the influence of Davies's father, who regularly went to musicals and dances and encouraged his children to sing songs at the piano. Kitts writes the music's mix of "breathy vocals" against the fast-paced piano and "thumping" bass convey both the passage of time and the anxiety of the narrator as he looks at photos of his happier past.

The song is one of several on the Kinks' 1968 album The Kinks Are the Village Green Preservation Society which thematically relate to memory. Its lyrics return to previous imagery on the album, such as the oak tree in "Village Green" and the family photos of "Picture Book", leading author Andy Miller to hypothesise that Davies wrote the song specifically to be a closing track. Like both "Picture Book" and the unreleased song "Pictures in the Sand", the song explores how memory relates to photographs and serves as a reflection on humans' transitory existence. Several authors see "Picture Book" and "People Take Pictures of Each Other" as direct contrasts of one another, with the latter featuring a darker reflection on photographs and memory. Author Christian Matijas-Mecca writes it combines several of the album's themes, including nostalgia, "the awkward outsider" and "the lost world of one's youth", and author Rob Jovanovic suggests the song serves as a commentary on the other tracks, which often document the experience of a specific character. Author Thomas M. Kitts suggests the song's closing line, "Don't show me no more, please", ends the album with frustration, while author Ken Rayes thinks the closing lines both restate the album's themes while resolving its central tensions, "[recognising] the intangibility of the past and the impossibility of truly recapturing and preserving it".

== Recording and release ==
The original stereo ending of "People Take Pictures of Each Other"
Andy Miller writes that the song's original ending of a trad jazz ragtime piece served as the album closer.

The Kinks recorded "People Take Pictures of Each Other" in July 1968 in Pye Studio 2, one of two basement studios at Pye Records' London offices. Davies is credited as the song's producer, and Pye's in-house engineer Brian Humphries operated the four-track mixing console. The recording employs a quickly strummed acoustic guitar and a fast, breathless lead vocal from Davies. In what was likely his final contribution to a Kinks recording, session keyboardist Nicky Hopkins plays harpsichord, along with what author Miller terms a "silly vaudeville piano vamp". The original stereo ending of "People Take Pictures of Each Other" featured a trad jazz ragtime piece. Davies was forced to remove it due to copyright issues, likely because he used a pre-existing tape rather than working with hired session musicians. There are three extant mixes of the song: the stereo mix both with and without the coda (running 2:22 and 2:10, respectively) and a slightly longer mono mix (2:14).

Davies sequenced "People Take Pictures of Each Other" as the closing track of the original twelve-track edition of Village Green, and retained that sequencing when he delayed the LP's release by two months to expand its track listing to fifteen. Pye released the fifteen-track edition of Village Green in the UK on 22 November 1968. In his preview of the album for New Musical Express magazine, critic Keith Altham wrote that "People Take Pictures of Each Other" "would go well with a line of girls kicking their legs in the air at the old Kingston Empire – if not it would go well without it". The reviewer for Disc and Music Echo counted it as among the most memorable songs on the album. Among retrospective assessors, Rolling Stone magazine's Kory Grow described the song as among the best Davies ever wrote, while Morgan Enos of Billboard magazine wrote that while the song contains "sneakily philosophical questions about permanence and memory", it "slips by so quickly you barely notice it".

== Other versions ==
The Kinks first performed "People Take Pictures of Each Other" in concert on 14 January 1973 at Theatre Royal, Drury Lane, augmented by additional singers and a brass section. The show marked the earliest iteration of Davies's attempt at a theatrical presentation of Village Green, a project he titled Preservation. The song was a regular in the band's February 1973 tour of the UK.

The El Salvadorian group Los Comets recorded a 1969 cover of the song as "Hay Que Respetar", making it the only track on Village Green to have been covered contemporaneously. American rock band the Dig covered the song in 2017, saying in an accompanying press release that the original had only become more relevant over time, further adding: "[T]he line 'people take pictures of each other, just to prove that they really existed' sounds like it could have been written as a commentary on pop culture in 2017. The idea that if it isn't on social media, it didn't happen."
