= All of My Friends Were There =

1968 song the Kinks

Song by the Kinks

from the album The Kinks Are the Village Green Preservation Society
- Released: 22 November 1968
- Studio: Pye, London
- Genre: Music hall
- Length: 2:23
- Label: Pye
- Songwriter: Ray Davies
- Producer: Ray Davies

Official audio
- "All of My Friends Were There" on YouTube

"All of My Friends Were There" is a song by the English rock band the Kinks from their sixth studio album, The Kinks Are the Village Green Preservation Society (1968). Written and sung by Ray Davies, the song was recorded in July or October 1968. It features a church-like organ and a changing metre, while the style showcased Davies's continued interest in music hall. The song's narrator describes an embarrassing concert experience which all of his friends were present to witness. Its lyrics were inspired by a July 1967 concert during which Davies fell ill but was persuaded to perform due to the agreed contract. The song was not present on Davies's original twelve-track edition of Village Green, but was among the tracks he added for its UK release in November 1968. Retrospective commentators have described the song in favourable terms while disputing its level of thematic cohesion with the others on Village Green.

== Background and composition ==
It was an R&B concert and I had a temperature of 104 [Fahrenheit] but they asked me to do it because there was a contract. I had lots and lots to drink and I thought "It doesn't matter." The curtains opened and all my friends were sitting in the front row ... It was a terrible night and I thought I would write a song about it.

— Ray Davies, November 1968

Ray Davies was inspired to write "All of My Friends Were There" after a concert experience on 1 July 1967. The Kinks had agreed to play at the South East R&B Festival at Rectory Field in Blackheath, London, an event sponsored by Melody Maker magazine. Davies fell ill before the performance but was persuaded to perform due to the agreed contract. After drinking heavily before going onstage, he noticed all of his friends sitting in the front row. Author Clinton Heylin raises the possibility Davies was also inspired by his mental breakdown in March 1966, while author Patricia Gordon Sullivan suggests the song's format arose from his time spent as a child listening to his father's sing-alongs at the local pub.

"All of My Friends Were There" is played in the style of early 20th century music hall, especially the verses which feature a quickly delivered vocal and what musicologist Allan F. Moore terms an "'oompah' accompanimental pattern". The composition employs a shifting metre, using common time (4/4) during the verses and waltz time (3/4) during the choruses. (Note: While metre changes are not common in music hall, there are limited examples of it occurring, like in George Alex Stevens and Charles Ridgewell's 1910 song "I'm Shy, Mary Ellen, I'm Shy", popularised by Jack Pleasants.) Davies sings his lead vocal in a Cockney accent, similar to the music hall singer Gus Elen, a favourite of his father. Partway through the song, he changes to a more posh tone while the arrangement speeds up. The song ends on a dominant seventh chord; musicologist Stan Hawkins writes the chord is an awkward closer and positions the listener for reflection, while author Johnny Rogan thinks it leaves the song unresolved, turning it into a shaggy dog story.

When writing "All of My Friends Were There", Davies altered his original embarrassment into a bathetic comedy number. The narrator describes his embarrassment after his friends attend his missed performance. After struggling during his next show, he goes to a café he frequented during happier times in his life, only to find all of them there as well. Author Ken Rayes describes the ending as "another typical Davies twist", where "in the end, the presence of the singer's friends both deepens his embarrassment and strengthens his stability and sense of companionship". Author Andy Miller instead interprets the ending as the singer's nostalgia for the earlier time, with his happy surroundings instead imaginary.

== Recording and release ==
The Kinks' recording of "All of My Friends Were There" was absent from Davies's original twelve-track edition of The Kinks Are the Village Green Preservation Society, planned for release in September 1968. When Davies delayed the album's release to expand it to fifteen tracks, "All of My Friends Were There" was among the songs he added. The Kinks may have recorded it in mid-October 1968 during the same sessions as "Big Sky" and "Last of the Steam-Powered Trains", though the song is possibly dated earlier to July 1968. (Note: In Doug Hinman and Jason Brabazon's 1994 self-published Kinks discography, they date the recording of "All of My Friends Were There" to July 1968. Later authors like Peter Doggett (1998) and Andy Miller (2003) cite Hinman & Brabazon's book to provide the same dating. In his 2004 band discography, Hinman updated his dating to either July or October 1968.) Recording took place in Pye Studio 2, one of two basement studios at Pye Records' London offices. Davies is credited as the song's producer, while Pye's in-house engineer Brian Humphries operated the four-track mixing console. The recording features an electric organ played in a church-like style, something Rogan thinks furthers the "quizzical nature" of the singer's experiences.

If I'd done that song today, it would have been A&R'd off the album. But sometimes you need minor gems like that to set up the other songs, rather than just sticking to the ones that get played on the radio.

— Ray Davies on "All of My Friends Were There", 2003

Pye released Village Green in the UK on 22 November 1968. "All of My Friends Were There" appears on the LP's second side, between "Phenomenal Cat" and "Wicked Annabella". In his review of the album for The Village Voice, Robert Christgau characterised the song as "a wry comipathedy about public embarrassment". He suggested the song demonstrates the "weird control" that Davies displays at his best, its "not-quite surreal tone" similar to American musician Randy Newman. In a retrospective assessment, Morgan Enos of Billboard described the song as "bubbly and hilarious", writing that Davies transformed his original embarrassment "into gold". On NPR's programme All Songs Considered, musician and producer John Vanderslice selected it as his pick for "perfect song", calling the song "deceptively simple" while lauding Davies's ability to write about the process of creativity. Heylin considers the song to be a major statement on Davies's part and anticipatory of the band's succeeding concept albums, though he writes it is thematically separate from the LP's central themes. Author Mark Doyle instead considers the song another of the album's character studies, its unnamed narrator "clearly another inhabitant of the village green".
