= Animal Farm (song) =

1968 song by the Kinks

Song by the Kinks

from the album The Kinks Are the Village Green Preservation Society
- Released: 22 November 1968
- Recorded: March 1968
- Studio: Pye, London
- Genre: Pop
- Length: 2:57
- Label: Pye
- Songwriter: Ray Davies
- Producer: Ray Davies

Official audio
- "Animal Farm" on YouTube

"Animal Farm" is a song by the English rock band the Kinks from their sixth studio album, The Kinks Are the Village Green Preservation Society (1968). Written and sung by Ray Davies, the song was recorded in March 1968. Musically an example of pop, the song features a noticeably larger sound than the others on Village Green, accomplished through it being recorded in a larger studio space as well as heavy reverb added to its drums, percussion and tack piano. The song is one of the few Kinks recordings from the late 1960s to possibly feature real strings, as arranged by David Whitaker.

While the song's title references George Orwell's 1945 novella of the same name, the lyrics are unrelated to the book's dystopic themes and instead express feelings of pastoral bliss in recollecting life on a small farm. Pete Quaife later described the song as his favourite Davies composition and recalled relating to its themes as soon as Davies presented it to the band. Retrospective critics and commentators have similarly described the song in favourable terms, often counting it as among the best songs on Village Green. The song was covered by the Judybats in 1992.

== Background and composition ==
["Animal Farm"] was just me thinking everybody else is mad and we are all animals anyway – which is really the idea of the whole album. I'm just a city dropout I suppose.

— Ray Davies, November 1968

Ray Davies titled "Animal Farm" in reference to George Orwell's 1945 novella of the same name. His finished composition does not relate to the book's themes, but instead expresses feelings of pastoral bliss, reflecting an anti-urban theme which has more in common with H. G. Wells's 1910 novel, The History of Mr Polly. The song's narrator recalls an earlier time where he was happy living a simple life on a small farm, an experience unrelated to Davies's actual childhood growing up in North London. The narrator's recollections of the farm are always in the past tense, suggesting it may no longer exist. The singer yearns for his idealised world where people can be authentic rather than insincere actors.

Author Andy Miller finds "Animal Farm" musically both "light and joyful", describing it as the "most unapologetic pop song" on The Kinks Are the Village Green Preservation Society. In its evocation of simple village life, author Rob Jovanovic considers the song one of thematic centrepieces of Village Green. Author Thomas M. Kitts considers it one of the album's various character studies, wherein the narrator longs for the perceived peacefulness or innocence of the past. At the end of each verse, Davies repeats "animal farm" and "animal home", which Kitts writes "works as an incantation to focus his consciousness on a return to his Eden". Davies's lead vocal extends to the top of his range on the line "The sky is wide", something he later suggested reflected his confidence in his songwriting at that time.

== Recording ==
The beginning of the first verse of "Animal Farm"
The recording's large sound is a product of it being recorded in Pye's larger studio, as well as heavy reverb on its drums, percussion and tack piano.

The Kinks recorded "Animal Farm" in March 1968 in Pye Studio 1, one of two basement studios at Pye Records' London offices. Davies is credited as the song's producer, while Pye's in-house engineer Alan MacKenzie operated the four-track mixing console. While the band recorded most of Village Green in the smaller Studio 2, recording in the larger Studio 1 was typically reserved for songs requiring orchestral backing. The larger studio space provides the song with a noticeably larger sound, as does reverb added to its drums, percussion and tack piano. Instead of piano, author Johnny Rogan thinks session keyboardist Nicky Hopkins plays a harpsichord, which he writes "imbues the track with a stately grace". During the recording process, Ray and Dave Davies argued with bassist Pete Quaife over the song's opening; Quaife thought the bass should double the piano during the introduction, but the brothers rejected the idea and instead arranged for a "zooming" bass line.

Strings are generally absent from the Kinks late 1960s recordings, likely because Pye executives saw the hiring of an arranger and string players as too expensive to warrant. "Animal Farm" is one of two songs on Village Green to possibly feature a real string section, as arranged by English composer David Whitaker. Among band biographers, Miller and Doug Hinman write that Whitaker only arranged "Village Green" for the album, and Miller further specifies that the string sounds on "Animal Farm" were made with a Mellotron, a tape-loop-based keyboard instrument. In his liner notes to Village Green's 50th anniversary release, Andy Neill instead writes that Whitaker arranged real strings for both "Village Green" and "Animal Farm".

== Release and reception ==
"Animal Farm" was among the fifteen tracks Ray Davies sent to Reprise Records in June 1968 for the later aborted US-only album Four More Respected Gentlemen. He did not include the song on his original twelve-track edition of The Kinks Are the Village Green Preservation Society, planned for UK release in September 1968. When he delayed the album's release by two months to expand its track listing to fifteen tracks, "Animal Farm" was among the songs he added. Pye released the fifteen-track edition of Village Green in the UK on 22 November 1968, sequencing "Animal Farm" as the opening track of side two.

Among retrospective assessors, Morgan Enos of Billboard magazine placed "Animal Farm" second in his ranking of the album's songs. He describes the song as powerful and "a gorgeous ode to communing with the beasts and the birds". Writing for AllMusic, Stewart Mason characterises the song as "an endearing blend of silliness and genuine yearning", adding that while its imagery is "twee enough to have come from the pen of A.A. Milne", the song's yearning for escape is more authentic and personal than most of the similarly themed songs released around 1968. The song remained a favourite of Quaife's, who later listed it as his favourite Davies composition. Decades later, he reflected that the song's lyrics immediately appealed to him and he could "remember having the shivers" when Davies first played him the song on piano. In another interview, he added: "I still get shivers when I listen to it." Among band biographers, John Mendelsohn focuses his praise on the song's bass slides and the string arrangement, elements Miller similarly lauds while mentioning Davies's "uncommonly lusty" lead vocals, which he thinks "put the seal on a skilled and infectious group performance". Neville Marten and Jeff Hudson list it as one of the album's most memorable tracks, and Rogan considers the song a candidate for best on the album.

The American alternative rock band the Judybats covered this song for their 1992 album Down in the Shacks Where the Satellite Dishes Grow. Mason describes the version as "surprisingly nice", and Tom Demalon of AllMusic considers it one of the album's standout tracks.

== In popular culture ==
"Animal Farm" is featured in the credits of Zach Cregger's 2026 film Resident Evil.
