= Do You Remember Walter? =

- B-side of 1969 US single

Song by the Kinks

from the album The Kinks Are the Village Green Preservation Society
- Released: 22 November 1968
- Recorded: July 1968
- Studio: Pye, London
- Genre: Pop
- Length: 2:23
- Label: Pye
- Songwriter: Ray Davies
- Producer: Ray Davies

The Kinks US chronology
"Starstruck" (1969)	"The Village Green Preservation Society" / "Do You Remember Walter?" (1969)	"Victoria" (1969)

Official audio
- "Do You Remember Walter" on YouTube

"Do You Remember Walter?" (also spelled "Do You Remember Walter") (Note: The original release of Village Green included discrepancies between the titles listed on the album sleeve and those on the LP's central label; the song's title is spelled with a question mark on the label and without on the album sleeve. Among later releases, the 1969 American single and 2018 reissue of Village Green include the question mark, while the 1998 and 2004 CD reissues omit it.) is a song by the English rock band the Kinks from their sixth studio album, The Kinks Are the Village Green Preservation Society (1968). Written and sung by Ray Davies, the song was recorded in July 1968. The song's narrator recalls experiences with a childhood friend and speculates on an imagined reunion with him in adulthood, only to suspect that the two would no longer have anything to talk about. The song was directly inspired by a similar experience of Davies. As one of several character studies to appear on Village Green, the song is often characterised by commentators as central to the album's themes of nostalgia and loss. Retrospective commentators have described it as one of Davies's best compositions.

== Background and composition ==
Walter was a friend of mine, we used to play football together every Saturday. Then I met him again recently after about five years and we found we just didn't have anything to talk about.

– Ray Davies, November 1968

Ray Davies was inspired to compose "Do You Remember Walter" after running into an old friend and finding they didn't have anything to talk about. The friend directly inspired the song's character Walter. The song's narrator recalls his various exploits with Walter, such as playing cricket in the rain and smoking cigarettes together, and remembers a childhood promise they made to one another that they would sail away to sea. In the second half of the song, the singer's idealised memory of his friend is broken when he sees him as fat, married and what band biographer Johnny Rogan terms "irredeemably grown up". The singer mocks the older friend's early bedtime, while Walter is uninterested in his reminiscing of the past.

"Do You Remember Walter" is one of the songs thematically central to the Kinks' 1968 album The Kinks Are the Village Green Preservation Society; Miller considers it the album's "lyrical heart", and Rogan writes it centres on the album's themes of nostalgia and loss. Due to its examination of Walter, the song is one of several character studies which appear on Village Green. Rogan considers the song a departure from some of Davies's earlier compositions where he created idealised figures, focusing in particular on the 1967 song "David Watts". Rogan adds that while "David Watts" hero-worships in the present tense, the narrator of "Do You Remember Walter" instead contrasts the past and the present, conveying "a loss of almost tragic proportions" where the Walter character is "demythologised in adulthood". Academic Ken Rayes writes the song evokes the album's themes of English pastoral poetry, suggesting it is a variation on a convention in the genre in which a reader is addressed as an acquaintance and told about "a dead 'Golden Age' hero". In his November 1968 interview with Melody Maker, Davies stated the song's closing line, "People often change but memories of people can remain", served to sum up the song's message.

"Do You Remember Walter" is a pop song with a subdued production, allowing for attention to remain on the lyrics. After opening with what Rogan terms "machine gun drumming", the song is defined by a dominant piano and bass guitar, alongside snare rolls, elements which English professor Thomas M. Kitts thinks represent the narrator's "assault" on the adult Walter and the present. The song employs a vertical melody which band biographer Andy Miller compares to a piano exercise.

== Recording ==
External videos
- "Do You Remember Walter?" (Backing Track)
- "Do You Remember Walter?" (European Stereo Mix Without Tambourine)

The Kinks recorded "Do You Remember Walter" in July 1968 in Pye Studio 2, one of two basement studios at Pye Records' London offices. Davies is credited as the song's producer, while Pye's in-house engineer Brian Humphries operated the four-track mixing console. Davies's lead vocals are occasionally double tracked, and he sings in a tone of longing and regret. The recording employs a Mellotron – a tape-loop-based keyboard instrument – which mimics the sound of a horn section. The Mellotron follows the melody low in the mix, something Miller thinks contributes a rousing and melancholic effect. Davies mixed the recording quickly in August 1968, but remixed it in late October after the release of Village Green was delayed by two months. (Note: The original mono mix has more electric guitar, less Mellotron and no tambourine.)

== Release and legacy ==
Davies included "Do You Remember Walter" as the second track on his original twelve-track edition of The Kinks Are the Village Green Preservation Society, between "The Village Green Preservation Society" and "Picture Book". When he delayed the album's release by two months to expand it to fifteen tracks, "Do You Remember Walter" retained its sequence as second on the album. Pye released the fifteen-track edition of Village Green in the UK on 22 November 1968. In a contemporary review of the album for British music magazine Disc and Music Echo, the reviewer counted it as one of the most memorable songs on the album, adding that it "almost makes you want to cry, it's so sad!"

Reprise Records issued "The Village Green Preservation Society" backed with "Do You Remember Walter?" as an American single in July or August 1969. (Note: Rogan writes the single was released in August 1969, as do Hinman and Jason Brabazon in their self-published band discography. Village Green's 50th anniversary release includes a replica of the 7" single, with notes printed on its sleeve stating it was originally released in July 1969.) The release coincided with Warner Bros. Records' "God Save the Kinks" promotional campaign, which sought to reestablish the band's status in America after their informal four-year performance ban was lifted in the country. The Kinks never added "Do You Remember Walter" to their concert set list. They performed two studio takes of the song at Konk recording studios on 11 April 1994. The sessions were played in an unplugged style and filmed for a BBC documentary. When the Kinks' 1994 album To the Bone was re-released in 1996 with a CD of extra material, the 1994 recording of "Do You Remember Walter" was among the songs added.

In a retrospective assessment, Morgan Enos of Billboard magazine characterised the song as a "Kinks classic", writing it "deftly captures how old friendships change". Among band biographers, Andy Miller counts it as one of Davies's best compositions, and Johnny Rogan thinks it is "one of his greatest songs of the era". English rock band Electric Light Orchestra later repurposed the song's drum and piano intro for their 1978 single "Mr. Blue Sky", and Graham Coxon of the English rock band Blur named it as sometimes his "favourite song ever".
