= Wicked Annabella =

1968 song by the Kinks

Song by the Kinks

from the album The Kinks Are the Village Green Preservation Society
- Released: 22 November 1968
- Recorded: July 1968
- Studio: Pye, London
- Genre: Psychedelia, rock, acid rock
- Length: 2:40
- Label: Pye
- Songwriter: Ray Davies
- Producer: Ray Davies

Official audio
- "Wicked Annabella" on YouTube

"Wicked Annabella" is a song by the English rock band the Kinks from their 1968 album, The Kinks Are the Village Green Preservation Society (1968). Written by Ray Davies, it was recorded by the Kinks in July 1968. The song is Dave Davies's only lead vocal contribution on the album. It is one of several character studies on Village Green, recounting the wicked deeds of the local witch as a warning to children. Employing an eerie tone, its lyrics are darker than the rest of the album and have been likened by commentators to a dark fairy tale.

An example of psychedelia, the song includes guitar feedback and a long sustain, likely achieved through the use of an early solid-state amplifier, while Davies's lead vocal features heavy echo and reverb. Retrospective commentators have described the song as a departure from the relative calmness of Village Green and have often highlighted its guitar sound for praise.

== Background and composition ==
["Wicked Annabella"] is rather a crazy track. I just wanted to get one to sound as horrible as it could. I wanted a rude sound – and I got it.

— Ray Davies, November 1968

Ray Davies suggested in a November 1968 interview with Melody Maker that he composed "Wicked Annabella" to get a song "to sound as horrible as it could". The song is one of many character studies on the Kinks' 1968 album The Kinks Are the Village Green Preservation Society. Among band biographers, Andy Miller characterises "Wicked Annabella" as a "psychedelic nursery rhyme", while Johnny Rogan calls it a "black fairy tale". The lyrics recount the wicked deeds of the local witch, Wicked Annabella, and serves as a warning to children to stay in their beds and avoid the woods. The witch is said to live in "perpetual midnight", spending her time mixing brews, burning into others' souls with her eyes and preying on children. (Note: As an added layer of subtext, academic Ken Rayes suggests the singer's screams may further represent those of Annabella's sexual victim.)

The song opens with a bass and drum intro similar to the Rolling Stones' 1965 single "Get Off of My Cloud". Its main riff is reminiscent of the Doors' 1967 song "Light My Fire", something Rogan considers the "ultimate irony" since the Doors had based their 1968 single "Hello, I Love You" in-part on the Kinks' 1964 single "All Day and All of the Night".

Music critic Jim DeRogatis counts the song as the only example of psychedelia in the Kinks' discography, while musician Steve Alleman writes that its "freakout ending" is one of the few times the Kinks approached the genre, without actually achieving it. (Note: Alleman's other examples of the Kinks approaching psychedelia include the "strange yawning sound in the bass" on "Lazy Old Sun", the "blastoff intro" of "King Kong" and the Mellotron contributions to "Phenomenal Cat".) Journalist Nick Hasted thinks the song's guitar feedback makes it a typical "1968 rock nightmare". English professor Barry J. Faulk similarly writes that the song's makeup of "crashing guitar chords, tight harmonies, and an aggressive back-beat" makes it one of the few conventional rock songs on the album. He adds that it being Dave Davies's only lead vocal on the LP was possibly used to further separate it from the album's other tracks. Pop culture author Mike Segretto writes that while most of the songs on Village Green avoid the sounds of the contemporary music scene, the "fuzzed-out acid rock" of "Wicked Annabella" is one of the few traces of a 1968 music trend heard on the album. By contrast, historian Carey Fleiner suggests that rather than the "drug-fuelled dream imagery" becoming more present in 1967 and 1968 songs, the whimsical nature of "Wicked Annabella" and other Davies compositions likely owe more to the tradition of English fairy tales and the works of English author Kenneth Grahame.

== Recording ==
Excerpt from the end of "Wicked Annabella"
A portion of what Steve Alleman calls the song's "freakout ending". Several journalists and authors single out the song's guitar sound as the best on the album.

The Kinks recorded "Wicked Annabella" in July 1968 in Pye Studio 2, one of two basement studios at Pye Records' London offices. Davies is credited as the song's producer, while Pye's in-house engineer Brian Humphries operated the four-track mixing console. Dave Davies' double-tracked lead vocal ranges from frightened whispers to raging screams, while his laughter at the song's conclusion includes heavy echo and reverb. The song employs guitar feedback throughout and its conclusion features an interplay of drums and guitar. While Davies likely used his typical Vox AC30 amplifier for most of the tracks on Village Green, the long sustain heard on "Wicked Annabella" suggests the use of an early-era solid-state amplifier. Ray Davies quickly mixed the song in August 1968, but remixed it in late October 1968; the resulting mono version of the song has more reverb and is louder.

During the song's recording, Ray Davies allowed for greater creative input from his bandmates than was typical for him; Mick Avory altered his drum sound on the song by disengaging the snare, and during the song's breakdown, bassist Pete Quaife improvised a section of Johann Sebastian Bach's piece "Jesu, Joy of Man's Desiring" (1:12–1:19). Quaife later reflected: "I felt a little bit guilty about the Bach line at the time. I had visions of an irate Johann visiting me late at night ready to clobber me with [a] music stand!"

== Release and reception ==
Ray Davies included "Wicked Annabella" on the second side of the twelve- and fifteen-track editions of The Kinks Are the Village Green Preservation Society. Pye first released the twelve-track edition in Sweden and Norway on 9 October 1968, while the fifteen-track UK version followed on 22 November. In his September 1968 preview of the Village Green for New Musical Express magazine, critic Keith Altham described the song as Dave Davies's "turn to shine", writing that "those who have not heard colour feed back [sic] on amplifier have not heard Dave Davies". Reviewing the album for The Village Voice, Robert Christgau counted "Wicked Annabella" as one of the album's missteps due to an "impersonal artiness", preferring the album's songs which instead seem to originate in Ray Davies's actual life experiences.

The Kinks never performed the song live, but Dave Davies began including it in his set lists during his 1997 solo tours. Among retrospective assessors, Stephen Thomas Erlewine of AllMusic writes the song's "menace" is a surprise against the comparative calmness of the rest of the album, and Dylan Montanari of the website Spectrum Culture thinks that it, along with the song which follows it, "Monica", reflects a darker aspect of psychedelia than the earlier tracks on the album. Morgan Enos of Billboard magazine appreciated the eerie tone of "Wicked Annabella" and compared it to the Who's "Boris the Spider" (1966) and the Beatles' "Helter Skelter" (1968).
