= Perfect Sound Forever (book) =

- Author: Rob Jovanovic
- Language: English
- Subject: Pavement (band)
- Genre: Biography
- Publication date: 2004

Perfect Sound Forever: The Story of Pavement is a 2004 biographical book written by Rob Jovanovic about the 1990s indie rock band Pavement. It was published by Justin, Charles and Company.

== Reviews ==
The book was reviewed in Stylus Magazine, Publishers Weekly, and The Pitch. In the Pitch, Michael Vennard wrote that "even though the book glosses over the bulk of the band's later existence in favor of focusing on Pavement's development, Perfect Sound Forever is still a quick and enjoyable read for Pavement fans, casual and hardcore alike."
