= Rob Jovanovic =

British author

Rob Jovanovic is an author, most notable for his 2004 biography about the indie rock band Pavement, Perfect Sound Forever: The Story of Pavement. Jovanovic has also penned volumes on Beck, Richey Edwards of the Manic Street Preachers, Nirvana, Big Star, Kate Bush and R.E.M.

== Books ==
- Adventures in Hifi: The Complete R.E.M. (2001) ISBN 0752846183, 978-0752846187
- Perfect Sound Forever: The Story of Pavement (2004) ISBN 9781932112078
- Big Star: The Short Life, Painful Death, and Unexpected Resurrection of the Kings of Power Pop (2005) ISBN 9781556525964
- Seeing The Light: Inside The Velvet Underground (2012) ISBN 9781250000149
- God Save The Kinks (2013) ISBN 9781781311646
