= The Kinks discography =

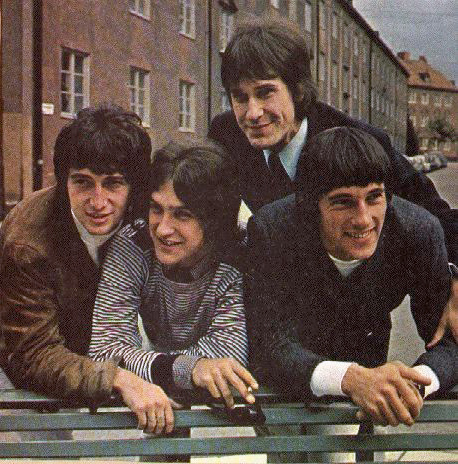
- The Kinks in Stockholm in 1965
- Studio albums: 25
- Extended plays: 18
- Soundtrack albums: 1
- Live albums: 5
- Compilation albums: 35
- Singles: 79
- Video albums: 9
- Music videos: 28
- Box sets: 12

The Kinks, an English rock band, were active for over three decades, from 1963 to 1996, releasing 26 studio albums and five live albums. The first two albums are differently released in the UK and the US, partly due to the difference in popularity of the extended play format (the UK market liked it, the US market did not, so US albums had the EP releases bundled onto them), and partly due to the US albums including the hit singles, and the UK albums not; after The Kink Kontroversy in 1965 the albums were the same. Between 100 and 200 compilation albums have been released worldwide.

Their hit singles included three UK number-one singles, starting in 1964 with "You Really Got Me"; plus 18 top-40 singles in the 1960s alone and further top-40 hits in the 1970s and 1980s. The Kinks had five top-10 singles on the US Billboard chart. Nine of their albums charted in the top 40. In the UK, the group had 17 top-20 singles and five top-10 albums. The RIAA has certified four of the Kinks' albums as gold records. The Kinks Greatest Hits!, released in 1966, was certified gold for sales totaling of one million dollars on 28 November 1968—six days after the release of The Kinks Are the Village Green Preservation Society, which failed to chart worldwide. The group would not receive another gold record award until 1979's Low Budget. The 1980 live album One for the Road was certified gold on 8 December 1980. Give the People What They Want, released in 1981, received its certification on 25 January 1982, for sales of 500,000 copies. ASCAP, the performing-rights group, presented the Kinks with an award for "One of the Most-Played Songs of 1983" for the hit single "Come Dancing".

== Albums ==
=== Studio albums ===
Title	Album details	Peak chart positions									Certifications
Title	Album details	UK	AUS	CAN	GER	NL	NOR	NZ	SWE	US	Certifications
Kinks (Note: Released in the US as You Really Got Me.)	Released: 2 October 1964; Label: Pye, Reprise; Formats: LP	3	—N/a	—	7	—N/a	—N/a	—N/a	—	29	
Kinda Kinks	Released: 5 March 1965; Label: Pye, Reprise; Formats: LP	3	—N/a	—	12	—N/a	—N/a	—N/a	—	60	
Kinks-Size (Note: US and Canada-only albums that combine tracks from UK EPs, singles and other non-US albums.)	Released: March 1965; Label: Reprise; Formats: LP	—	—N/a	—	—	—N/a	—N/a	—N/a	—	13	
Kinkdom	Released: 24 November 1965; Label: Reprise; Formats: LP	—	—N/a	—	—	—N/a	—N/a	—N/a	—	47	
The Kink Kontroversy	Released: 26 November 1965; Label: Pye, Reprise; Formats: LP	9	—N/a	—	8	—N/a	—N/a	—N/a	—	95	
Face to Face	Released: 28 October 1966; Label: Pye, Reprise; Formats: LP	12	—N/a	—	12	—N/a	9	—N/a	—	135	
Something Else by the Kinks	Released: 15 September 1967; Label: Pye, Reprise; Formats: LP, 4-track, 8-track	35	—N/a	—	31	—N/a	12	—N/a	—	153	
The Kinks Are the Village Green Preservation Society	Released: 22 November 1968; Label: Pye, Reprise; Formats: LP, 4-track, 8-track	48 (Note: Chart position reflects the 2018 deluxe reissue. The album did not chart on its original release.)	—N/a	—	84	—N/a	—	—N/a	—	—	BPI: Gold
Arthur (Or the Decline and Fall of the British Empire)	Released: 10 October 1969; Label: Pye, Reprise; Formats: LP, 4-track, 8-track	—	—N/a	54	68 (Note: Chart position reflects the 2019 deluxe reissue. The album did not chart on its original release.)	—	—	—N/a	—	105	
Lola Versus Powerman and the Moneygoround, Part One	Released: 27 November 1970; Label: Pye, Reprise; Formats: LP, MC, 4-track, 8-track	—	24	33	79 (Note: Chart position reflects the 2020 deluxe reissue. The album did not chart on its original release.)	—	—	—N/a	—	35	
Muswell Hillbillies	Released: 24 November 1971; Label: RCA; Formats: LP, 8-track	—	36	—	—	—	—	—N/a	—	100	
Everybody's in Show-Biz	Released: 1 September 1972; Label: RCA; Formats: 2×LP, 8-track	—	38	63	—	—	—	—N/a	—	70	
Preservation Act 1	Released: 16 November 1973; Label: RCA; Formats: LP, MC, 8-track	—	92	—	—	—	—	—N/a	—	177	
Preservation Act 2	Released: 8 May 1974; Label: RCA; Formats: 2×LP, MC, 8-track	—	—	—	—	—	—	—N/a	—	114	
The Kinks Present a Soap Opera	Released: 25 April 1975; Label: RCA; Formats: LP, MC, 8-track	—	—	86	—	—	—	—N/a	—	51	
The Kinks Present Schoolboys in Disgrace	Released: 17 November 1975; Label: RCA; Formats: LP, MC, 8-track	—	—	—	—	18	—	—	—	45	
Sleepwalker	Released: February 1977; Label: Arista; Formats: LP, MC, 8-track	—	—	13	—	—	—	—	29	21	
Misfits	Released: 19 May 1978; Label: Arista; Formats: LP, MC, 8-track	—	79	48	—	—	—	—	34	40	
Low Budget	Released: 10 July 1979; Label: Arista; Formats: LP, MC, 4-track, 8-track	—	85	13	—	—	—	—	46	11	MC: Platinum; RIAA: Gold
Give the People What They Want	Released: 26 August 1981; Label: Arista; Formats: LP, MC, 8-track	—	—	11	—	—	28	—	23	15	MC: Gold; RIAA: Gold
State of Confusion	Released: 24 May 1983; Label: Arista; Formats: LP, MC, 8-track	—	96	14	55	—	10	44	23	12	MC: Gold
Word of Mouth	Released: 15 November 1984; Label: Arista; Formats: LP, MC, 8-track	—	—	60	—	—	—	—	50	57	
Think Visual	Released: 17 November 1986; Label: London, MCA; Formats: CD, LP, MC	—	97	78	—	—	—	—	—	81	
UK Jive	Released: 2 October 1989; Label: London, MCA; Formats: CD, LP, MC	—	—	—	—	—	—	—	—	122	
Phobia	Released: 29 March 1993; Label: Columbia; Formats: CD, LP, MC, MD	—	—	—	92	—	—	—	—	166	
"—" denotes releases that did not chart or were not released in that territory.

=== Soundtrack albums ===
Title	Album details	Peak chart positions
Title	Album details	US
Percy	Released: 26 March 1971; Label: Pye; Formats: LP, MC	— (Note: Percy did not enter Billboard 200 chart, it charted #22 on the Soundtracks chart in 2021.)

=== Live albums ===
Title	Album details	Peak chart positions						Certifications
Title	Album details	AUS	CAN	GER	NL	NZ	US	Certifications
Live at Kelvin Hall (Note: Released in the US as The Kinks Live.)	Released: 16 August 1967; Label: Pye, Reprise; Formats: LP, 4-track, 8-track	—N/a	—	—	—N/a	—N/a	162	
One for the Road	Released: 4 June 1980; Label: Arista; Formats: 2×LP, MC, 8-track	71	24	49	31	31	14	MC: Gold; RIAA: Gold
The Road	Released: 9 December 1987; Label: MCA, London; Formats: CD, LP, MC	—	—	—	—	—	110	
To the Bone	Released: 3 October 1994; Label: Konk; Formats: CD, LP, MC	—	—	—	—	—	—	
Kinks in Koncert 1965	Released: 16 April 2016; Label: Rhythm & Blues; Formats: LP	—	—	—	—	—	—	
"—" denotes releases that did not chart or were not released in that territory.

=== Compilation albums ===
Title	Album details	Peak chart positions								Certifications
Title	Album details	UK	AUS	GER	NL	NOR	NZ	SWI	US	Certifications
The Kinks in Germany (Note: Album was only released in Germany.)	Released: November 1965; Label: Vogue; Formats: LP	—	—N/a	22	—N/a	—N/a	—N/a	—N/a	—	
The Kinks Greatest Hits! (Note: The Kinks Greatest Hits! was only released in the US, Canada and South America.)	Released: 10 August 1966; Label: Reprise; Formats: LP, 8-track	—	—N/a	—	—N/a	—N/a	—N/a	—N/a	9	RIAA: Gold
Well Respected Kinks	Released: 2 September 1966; Label: Marble Arch; Formats: LP, 8-track	5	—N/a	—	—N/a	2	—N/a	—N/a	—	
Sunny Afternoon	Released: 17 November 1967; Label: Marble Arch; Formats: LP, 8-track	9	—N/a	—	—N/a	—	—N/a	—N/a	—	
The Kinks	Released: 27 February 1970; Label: Pye; Formats: 2×LP	—	—	—	—	—	—N/a	—N/a	—	
Golden Hour of the Kinks	Released: 8 October 1971; Label: Golden Hour; Formats: LP, MC, 8-track	21	—	—	—	—	—N/a	—N/a	—	
The Kink Kronikles (Note: The Kink Kronikles was only initially released in the US, before having a worldwide release in 2020.)	Released: March 1972; Label: Reprise; Formats: 2×LP, MC, 4-track, 8-track	—	—	—	—	—	—N/a	—N/a	94	
The Great Lost Kinks Album (Note: The Great Lost Kinks Album was only released in the US.)	Released: 25 January 1973; Label: Reprise; Formats: LP, MC, 4-track, 8-track	—	—	—	—	—	—N/a	—N/a	145	
The Kinks' Greatest: Celluloid Heroes	Released: 25 June 1976; Label: RCA; Formats: LP, MC, 8-track	—	—	—	—	—	—	—N/a	144	
20 Golden Greats	Released: October 1978; Label: Ronco; Formats: LP, MC	19	—	—	—	—	—	—N/a	—	
Ihre 20 größten Hits	Released: February 1979; Label: Arcade; Formats: LP, MC	—	—	4	—	—	—	—N/a	—	
Second Time Around (Note: Second Time Around was only released in the US, Canada, Australia, New Zealand and Spain.)	Released: 22 August 1980; Label: RCA; Formats: LP, MC, 8-track	—	—	—	—	—	—	—N/a	177	
The Best Of (Note: Album was only released in the Netherlands.)	Released: February 1981; Label: Trent; Formats: LP, MC	—	—	—	24	—	—	—N/a	—	
Dead End Street – Greatest Hits	Released: 14 October 1983; Label: PRT; Formats: LP	96	—	—	—	—	—	—	—	
Come Dancing with the Kinks: The Best of 1977–1986	Released: 2 June 1986; Label: Arista; Formats: CD, 2×LP, MC	—	—	—	—	—	—	—	159	
The Kinks Are Well Respected Men	Released: 28 September 1987; Label: PRT; Formats: 2×CD, 2×LP, MC	—	—	—	—	—	—	—	—	
Greatest Hits	Released: 28 March 1989; Label: Rhino; Formats: CD, LP, MC	—	—	—	—	—	—	—	—	
The Ultimate Collection	Released: 4 September 1989; Label: RCA; Formats: CD, 2×LP, MC	35	37	—	—	—	—	—	—	BPI: Gold; ARIA: Gold
Lost & Found 1986–89 (Note: Lost & Found 1986–89 was only released in the US.)	Released: 27 August 1991; Label: MCA; Formats: CD, MC	—	—	—	—	—	—	—	—	
Greatest Hits	Released: November 1991; Label: SPH; Formats: 2×CD, MC	—	—	—	33	—	—	—	—	
The Definitive Collection	Released: 6 September 1993; Label: PolyGram TV; Formats: CD	18	—	—	—	—	—	—	—	BPI: Gold
The Best of the Kinks – 20 Classic Tracks	Released: July 1994; Label: Kaz; Formats: CD, MC	—	—	—	—	—	—	—	—	BPI: Gold
Greatest Hits (Note: Album was only released in Norway.)	Released: 1996; Label: Arcade; Formats: CD, MC	—	—	—	—	31	—	—	—	
The Very Best Of	Released: 31 March 1997; Label: PolyGram TV; Formats: CD	42	—	—	—	—	—	—	—	
The Singles Collection	Released: 29 September 1997; Label: Essential!; Formats: 2×LP, 2×MC	39 (Note: Peak position in 2011. Previously reached number 96 in 1997 and number 81 in 2001.)	—	—	—	—	—	—	—	BPI: Gold
You Really Got Me – The Best of the Kinks	Released: 26 July 1999; Label: Castle Select; Formats: CD, MC	—	—	—	—	—	—	—	—	BPI: Platinum
BBC Sessions 1964–1977	Released: 12 March 2001; Label: Sanctuary; Formats: 2×CD, 3×LP	—	—	—	—	—	—	—	—	
The Ultimate Collection	Released: 27 May 2002; Label: Sanctuary; Formats: 2×CD	32	—	—	—	5	46	71 (Note: Chart position in 2020.)	—	BPI: 2×Platinum
Kinks Kollekted – Complete History 1964–1994	Released: 12 August 2011; Label: Universal; Formats: 3×CD	—	—	—	10	—	—	—	—	
Waterloo Sunset: The Very Best of the Kinks & Ray Davies	Released: 12 August 2011; Label: Universal; Formats: 3×CD	14	—	—	—	—	—	—	—	BPI: Silver
The Essential Kinks	Released: 14 October 2014; Label: RCA/Arista; Formats: 2×CD	—	—	—	—	—	—	—	—	
Sunny Afternoon: The Very Best of the Kinks	Released: 16 October 2015; Label: Sanctuary; Formats: 2×CD, digital download	21	—	—	—	—	—	—	—	
The Journey, Pt. 1	Released: 24 March 2023; Label: BMG; Formats: 2×CD, 2×LP, digital download	41	—	37	—	—	—	—	—	
The Journey, Pt. 2	Released: 17 November 2023; Label: BMG; Formats: 2×CD, 2×LP, digital download	93	—	63	—	—	—	71	—	
The Journey, Pt. 3	Released: 11 July 2025; Label: BMG; Formats: 2×CD, 2×LP, digital download	—	—	68	—	—	—	80	—	
"—" denotes releases that did not chart or were not released in that territory.

=== Box sets ===
Title	Album details	Peak chart positions				
Title	Album details	UK	GER	NL	NOR	US Indie
20th Anniversary Box Set	Released: November 1984; Label: PRT; Formats: 3×LP	—	—	—	—	—
The EP Collection	Released: 9 November 1998; Label: Essential!; Formats: 10×CDS	—	—	—	—	—
The EP Collection 2	Released: August 2000; Label: Essential!; Formats: 10×CDS	—	—	—	—	—
The Marble Arch Years	Released: 21 September 2001; Label: Castle Music; Formats: 3×CD	—	—	—	—	—
The Pye Album Collection	Released: 25 April 2005; Label: Castle Music; Formats: 10×CD	—	—	—	—	—
Arista Years (Note: Arista Years and RCA Years were only released in the US.)	Released: 17 October 2006; Label: Konk/Koch; Formats: 7×SACD	—	—	—	—	—
RCA Years	Released: 17 October 2006; Label: Konk/Koch; Formats: 6×SACD	—	—	—	—	—
Picture Book	Released: 8 December 2008; Label: Universal; Formats: 6×CD	—	—	—	—	—
The Kinks in Mono	Released: 21 November 2011; Label: Sanctuary/Universal; Formats: 10×CD	—	—	—	—	—
The Kinks at the BBC	Released: 21 August 2012; Label: Sanctuary/Universal; Formats: 5×CD+DVD	110	57	60	40	—
The Anthology 1964–1971	Released: 17 November 2014; Label: Sanctuary/Legacy; Formats: 5×CD+7"	—	—	—	—	39
The Mono Collection	Released: 18 November 2016; Label: Sanctuary/Legacy, BMG; Formats: 10×LP	—	—	—	—	—
"—" denotes releases that did not chart or were not released in that territory.

== EPs ==
Title (Note: This is a list of EPs released in the UK and those that have been released or re-released in the US. The UK EP chart was discontinued in December 1967 and later EPs were included in the singles chart.)	EP details	Peak chart positions		
Title	EP details	UK	US Indie	US Album
Kinksize Session	Released: 27 November 1964; Label: Pye; Formats: 7"; Released in the US on 18 April 2015	1	—	—
All Day and All of the Night	Released: December 1964; Label: Vogue; Formats: 7"; Originally only released in France; released in the US and Europe on 22 April 2017	—	—	—
Got Love If You Want It	Released: January 1965; Label: Vogue; Formats: 7"; Originally only released in France; released in the US and Europe on 22 April 2017	—	48	—
Kinksize Hits	Released: 15 January 1965; Label: Pye; Formats: 7"; Released in the US on 18 April 2015	3	—	—
Kwyet Kinks	Released: 17 September 1965; Label: Pye; Formats: 7"; Released in the US on 27 November 2015	1	—	—
Dedicated Kinks	Released: 15 July 1966; Label: Pye; Formats: 7"; Released in the US on 27 November 2015	7	—	—
Mister Pleasant	Released: May 1967; Label: Pye; Formats: 7"; Originally only released in France; released in the US and Europe on 16 April 2016	—	—	—
Waterloo Sunset	Released: July 1967; Label: Pye; Formats: 7"; Originally only released in France; released in the UK in 1998 and worldwide in 2022	—	—	70
The Kinks	Released: 19 April 1968; Label: Pye; Formats: 7"; Released in the US on 25 November 2016	—	—	—
You Really Got Me	Released: 27 August 1971; Label: Pye; Formats: 7"	—	—	—
The Kinks Live EP	Released: 11 July 1980; Label: Arista; Formats: 7"	—	—	—
State of Confusion	Released: 23 March 1984; Label: Arista; Formats: 7", 12"	121	—	—
Did Ya	Released: October 1991; Label: Columbia; Formats: CDS, CS	—	—	—
Waterloo Sunset '94 EP	Released: 17 October 1994; Label: Konk; Formats: CDS	—	—	—
The Days EP	Released: December 1996; Label: When! Recordings; Formats: CDS, CS	35	—	—
Till Death Us Do Part	Released: 25 November 2016; Label: Sanctuary; Formats: 7"	—	—	—
Ravensize Session (The Pre-Kinks Regent Studio Demos)	Released: 22 April 2017; Label: Rhythm & Blues; Formats: 7"	—	—	—
Kinks TV Session	Released: 7 November 2018; Label: Rhythm & Blues; Formats: 7"	—	—	—
"—" denotes releases that did not chart or were not released in that territory.

== Singles ==
=== 1960s ===
Title	Year	Peak chart positions										Certifications	Album
Title	Year	UK	AUS	AUT	CAN	GER	IRE	NL	NZ	SWE	US	Certifications	Album
"Long Tall Sally" b/w "I Took My Baby Home"	1964	— (Note: "Long Tall Sally" did not chart on the Record Retailer chart, but did reach number 42 on the Melody Maker.)	—	—	—	—	—	—	—	—	129		Non-album singles
"You Still Want Me" b/w "You Do Something to Me"	1964	—	—	—	—	—	—	—	—	—	—		Non-album singles
"You Really Got Me" b/w "It's All Right" (non-album track)	1964	1	8	—	4	39	6	—	2	11	7	BPI: Platinum	Kinks
"All Day and All of the Night" b/w "I Gotta Move"	1964	2	14	—	12	22	—	9	5	18	7	BPI: Gold	Non-album single (Note: Included on Kinks-Size in the US.)
"Tired of Waiting for You" b/w "Come On Now"	1965	1	29	—	3	13	3	— (Note: "Tired of Waiting for You" did not enter the then Top 10, but did peak at number 18 on the Dutch Top 40.)	—	6	6		Kinda Kinks
"Ev'rybody's Gonna Be Happy" (Note: "Ev'rybody's Gonna Be Happy" and "Who'll Be the Next in Line" were respectively the A-side and B-side of a UK/European single. This single was released several months later in North America, with the A-side and B-side reversed.) b/w "Who'll Be the Next in Line"	1965	17	—	—	— 25	29	—	— (Note: "Ev'rybody's Gonna Be Happy" did not enter the then Top 10, but did peak at number 28 on the Dutch Top 40.)	—	—	— 34		Non-album singles
"Set Me Free" b/w "I Need You"	1965	9	54	—	2	32	—	— (Note: "Set Me Free" did not enter the then Top 10, but did peak at number 12 on the Dutch Top 40.)	—	—	23		Non-album singles
"See My Friends" b/w "Never Met a Girl Like You Before"	1965	10	—	—	—	36	—	— (Note: "See My Friends" did not enter the then Top 10, but did peak at number 26 on the Dutch Top 40.)	—	19	111		Non-album single (Note: Included on Kinkdom in the US.)
"A Well Respected Man" (Note: "A Well Respected Man" was not released in a single in the UK (where it was released on the EP Kwyet Kinks), but was released in a number of other territories including the US, Canada, Australia and the Netherlands.) b/w "Such a Shame"	1965	—	11	—	—	—	—	6	—	5	13		Kwyet Kinks
"Till the End of the Day" b/w "Where Have All the Good Times Gone"	1965	8	63	—	34	19	—	6	—	3	50		The Kink Kontroversy
"Dedicated Follower of Fashion" b/w "Sittin' on My Sofa"	1966	4	36	—	11	11	3	1	1	6	36		Non-album single
"Wonder Where My Baby Is Tonight" (Note: "Wonder Where My Baby Is Tonight" was only released as a single in Scandinavia.) b/w "I Need You" (non-album track)	1966	—	—	—	—	—	—	—	—	7	—		Kinda Kinks
"Sunny Afternoon" b/w "I'm Not Like Everybody Else" (non-album track)	1966	1	13	5	1	7	1	1	2	2	14	BPI: Platinum	Face to Face
"Dandy" (Note: "Dandy" was not released as a single in the UK but was elsewhere in Europe and several other territories.) b/w "Party Line"	1966	—	—	6	—	1	—	2	—	—	—		Face to Face
"Dead End Street" b/w "Big Black Smoke"	1966	5	62	—	28	5	7	4	4	12	73		Non-album singles
"Mr. Pleasant" (Note: "Mr. Pleasant" was set for release as a single in the UK before being withdrawn. However, it was released in the majority of other territories.) b/w "Harry Rag" (US) "This Is Where I Belong" (Europe)	1967	—	35	—	79	12	—	2	—	—	80		Non-album singles
"Waterloo Sunset" b/w "Act Nice and Gentle" (non-album track) (UK) "Two Sisters" (US)	1967	2	4	10	—	7	3	1	7	14	—	BPI: Platinum	Something Else by the Kinks
"Death of a Clown" b/w "Love Me Till the Sun Shines" (credited to Dave Davies)	1967	3	44	8	—	3	6	2	10	—	—		Something Else by the Kinks
"Autumn Almanac" b/w "Mr. Pleasant" (UK) "David Watts" (non-UK)	1967	3	67	—	—	13	15	5	17	—	—		Non-album singles
"Susannah's Still Alive" b/w "Funny Face" (credited to Dave Davies)	1967	20	—	—	—	27	—	5	—	17	—		Non-album singles
"Wonderboy" b/w "Polly"	1968	36	—	—	—	29	—	4	—	—	—		Non-album singles
"Days" b/w "She's Got Everything"	1968	12	77	—	—	28	16	6	11	—	—		Non-album singles
"Lincoln County" b/w "There Is No Life Without Love" (credited to Dave Davies)	1968	—	—	—	—	—	—	13	—	—	—		Non-album singles
"Starstruck" (Note: "Starstruck" was only released as a single in the US, Australia and Europe.) b/w "Picture Book"	1968	—	— 36	—	—	—	—	9	—	—	—		The Kinks Are the Village Green Preservation Society
"The Village Green Preservation Society" (Note: "The Village Green Preservation Society" was only released as a single in Denmark and the US.) b/w "Picture Book" (Denmark) "Do You Remember Walter?" (US)	1968	—	—	—	—	—	—	—	—	—	—		The Kinks Are the Village Green Preservation Society
"Hold My Hand" b/w "Creeping Jean" (credited to Dave Davies)	1969	—	—	—	—	—	—	—	—	—	—		Non-album singles
"Plastic Man" b/w "King Kong"	1969	31	97	—	—	34	—	16	—	—	—		Non-album singles
"Drivin'" b/w "Mindless Child of Motherhood" (non-album track)	1969	—	—	—	—	—	—	—	—	—	—		Arthur (Or the Decline and Fall of the British Empire)
"Shangri-La" b/w "This Man He Weeps Tonight" (non-album track)	1969	—	—	—	—	—	—	24	—	—	—		Arthur (Or the Decline and Fall of the British Empire)
"Australia" (Note: "Australia" was only released as a single in Australia.) b/w "She Bought a Hat Like Princess Marina"	1969	—	—	—	—	—	—	—	—	—	—		Arthur (Or the Decline and Fall of the British Empire)
"Victoria" b/w "Mr. Churchill Says" (UK) "Brainwashed" (US)	1969	33	57	—	33	—	—	—	—	—	62		Arthur (Or the Decline and Fall of the British Empire)
"—" denotes releases that did not chart or were not released in that territory.

=== 1970s ===
Title	Year	Peak chart positions										Certifications	Album
Title	Year	UK	AUS	AUT	CAN	GER	IRE	NL	NZ	SWE	US	Certifications	Album
"Lola" b/w "Berkeley Mews" (non-album track) (UK) "Mindless Child of Motherhood" (US)	1970	2	4	2	2	2	1	1	1	5	9	BPI: Platinum	Lola Versus Powerman and the Moneygoround, Part One
"Apeman" b/w "Rats"	1970	5	5	2	19	8	10	9	5	—	45		Lola Versus Powerman and the Moneygoround, Part One
"God's Children" b/w "Moments" (UK) "The Way Love Used to Be" (US)	1971	—	53	—	—	—	—	—	—	—	—		Percy
"20th Century Man" (Note: "20th Century Man" was only released as a single in certain territories including the US, Australia and the Netherlands.) b/w "Skin and Bone"	1971	—	89	—	—	—	—	—	—	—	106		Muswell Hillbillies
"Supersonic Rocket Ship" b/w "You Don't Know My Name"	1972	16	—	—	—	—	—	25	—	—	111		Everybody's in Show-Biz
"Celluloid Heroes" b/w "Hot Potatoes"	1972	—	—	—	—	—	—	—	—	—	—		Everybody's in Show-Biz
"One of the Survivors" (Note: "One of the Survivors" was only released as a single in the US and Japan.) b/w "Scrapheap City"	1973	—	—	—	—	—	—	—	—	—	108		Preservation Act 1
"Sitting in the Midday Sun" b/w "One of the Survivors" (UK) "Sweet Lady Genevieve" (US)	1973	—	—	—	—	—	—	—	—	—	—		Preservation Act 1
"Sweet Lady Genevieve" b/w "Sitting in My Hotel"	1973	—	—	—	—	—	—	—	—	—	—		Preservation Act 1
"Money Talks" b/w "Here Comes Flash"	1974	—	—	—	—	—	—	—	—	—	—		Preservation Act 2
"Mirror of Love" (Note: "Mirror of Love" was initially released in the UK in April 1974 with the B-side "Cricket", before a re-recorded version was released several months later with the B-side "He's Evil" in the UK and US.) b/w "Cricket" (UK) "He's Evil" (US/UK)	1974	—	—	—	—	—	—	—	—	—	—		Preservation Act 2
"Holiday Romance" b/w "Shepherds of the Nation"	1974	—	—	—	—	—	—	—	—	—	—		Soap Opera
"Preservation" (Note: "Preservation" was only released as a single in the US and Yugoslavia.) b/w "Salvation Road" (from Preservation Act 2)	1974	—	—	—	—	—	—	—	—	—	—		Non-album single
"Starmaker" (Note: "Starmaker" was only released as a single in the US and Australia.) b/w "Ordinary People"	1975	—	—	—	—	—	—	—	—	—	—		Soap Opera
"Ducks on the Wall" b/w "Rush Hour Blues"	1975	—	—	—	—	—	—	—	—	—	—		Soap Opera
"You Can't Stop the Music" b/w "Have Another Drink"	1975	—	—	—	—	—	—	—	—	—	—		Soap Opera
"I'm in Disgrace" (Note: "I'm in Disgrace" was only released as a single in the US and Canada.) b/w "The Hard Way"	1976	—	—	—	—	—	—	—	—	—	—		Schoolboys in Disgrace
"No More Looking Back" b/w "Jack the Idiot Dunce"/"The Hard Way"	1976	—	—	—	—	—	—	—	—	—	—		Schoolboys in Disgrace
"Sleepwalker" b/w "Full Moon"	1977	—	—	—	54	—	—	—	—	—	48		Sleepwalker
"Juke Box Music" b/w "Sleepless Nights" (UK) "Life Goes On" (US)	1977	—	—	—	—	—	—	—	—	—	—		Sleepwalker
"Father Christmas" b/w "Prince of the Punks"	1977	—	—	—	—	—	—	—	—	—	—		Non-album single
"A Rock 'n' Roll Fantasy" b/w "Artificial Light" (non-album track) (UK) "Live Life" (US) / "Get Up" (US 2nd pressings)	1978	—	—	—	31	—	—	—	—	—	30		Misfits
"Live Life" b/w "In a Foreign Land" (UK) "Black Messiah" (US)	1978	—	—	—	—	—	—	—	—	—	—		Misfits
"Black Messiah" b/w "Misfits"	1978	—	—	—	—	—	—	—	—	—	—		Misfits
"(Wish I Could Fly Like) Superman" b/w "Low Budget"	1979	—	71	—	43	—	—	—	—	—	41		Low Budget
"A Gallon of Gas" (Note: "A Gallon of Gas" was only released as a single in the US and Japan.) b/w "Low Budget"	1979	—	—	—	—	—	—	—	—	—	—		Low Budget
"Catch Me Now I'm Falling" (Note: "Catch Me Now I'm Falling" was only released as a single in the US, Canada and the Netherlands) b/w "Low Budget"	1979	—	—	—	—	—	—	—	—	—	—		Low Budget
"Moving Pictures" b/w "In a Space"	1979	—	—	—	—	—	—	—	—	—	—		Low Budget
"Pressure" b/w "National Health"	1979	—	—	—	—	—	—	—	—	—	—		Low Budget
"—" denotes releases that did not chart or were not released in that territory.

=== 1980s ===
Title	Year	Peak chart positions									Album
Title	Year	UK	AUS	AUT	CAN	IRE	NL	NZ	SWE	US	Album
"You Really Got Me" (live) b/w "All Day and All of the Night" (live) (UK) "Attitude" (live) (US)	1980	—	—	—	—	—	—	—	—	—	One for the Road
"Lola" (live) (Note: The live version of "Lola" was only released as a single in North America, Continental Europe and in several other territories.) b/w "Celluloid Heroes" (live)	1980	—	69	—	—	—	1	—	—	81	One for the Road
"Better Things" b/w "Massive Reductions" (UK) "Yo-Yo" (US)	1981	46	—	—	—	—	—	—	—	92	Give the People What They Want
"Destroyer" (Note: "Destroyer" was released as a single in North America, Continental Europe, Australasia and several other territories.) b/w "Back to Front"	1981	—	—	—	35	—	—	—	—	85	Give the People What They Want
"Predictable" b/w "Back to Front"	1981	—	—	—	—	—	—	—	—	—	Give the People What They Want
"Come Dancing" b/w "Noise"	1982	12	36	—	6	4	29	—	18	6	State of Confusion
"Don't Forget to Dance" b/w "Bernadette" (UK) "Young Conservatives" (US)	1983	58	—	11	26	—	—	38	—	29	State of Confusion
"You Really Got Me" (reissue) b/w "You Really Got Me"/"All Day and All of the Night" (medley) / "Misty Water"	1983	47	—	—	—	—	—	—	—	—	Non-album single
"Good Day" b/w "Too Hot"	1984	143	—	—	—	—	—	—	—	—	Word of Mouth
"Do It Again" b/w "Guilty"	1984	132	—	—	91	—	—	—	—	41	Word of Mouth
"Summer's Gone" (Note: "Summer's Gone" was only released as a single in the US and Canada.) b/w "Going Solo"	1985	—	—	—	—	—	—	—	—	—	Word of Mouth
"Rock 'n' Roll Cities" (Note: "Rock 'n' Roll Cities" was only released as a single in the US and Canada.) b/w "Welcome to Sleazy Town"	1986	—	—	—	—	—	—	—	—	—	Think Visual
"How Are You" b/w "Killing Time" (UK) "Working at the Factory" (US)	1986	86	—	—	—	—	—	—	—	—	Think Visual
"Lost and Found" b/w "Killing Time"	1987	142	—	—	—	—	—	—	—	—	Think Visual
"The Road" b/w "Art Lover"	1988	—	—	—	—	—	—	—	—	—	Live: The Road
"Down All the Days (Till 1992)" b/w "You Really Got Me" (live)	1989	108	—	—	—	—	—	—	—	—	UK Jive
"How Do I Get Close" b/w "Down All the Days (Till 1992)" (UK) "War Is Over" (US)	1989	159	—	—	—	—	—	—	—	—	UK Jive
"—" denotes releases that did not chart or were not released in that territory.

=== 1990s–present ===
Title	Year	Peak chart positions	Album
Title	Year	UK	Album
"Only a Dream" b/w "Somebody Stole My Car"	1993	84	Phobia
"Scattered" (Note: "Scattered" was only released as a single in Continental Europe, and as a promo-only single in the US.) b/w "Hatred (A Duet)"	1993	—	Phobia
"You Really Got Me" (Note: "You Really Got Me" was reissued for its 40th anniversary as a replica of the original Pye 2-track 7-inch single and a CD single which added rarity "Misty Water".) b/w "It's All Right"	2004	42	Non-album singles
"Waterloo Sunset" (Note: "Waterloo Sunset" was reissued for its 40th anniversary as a replica of the original UK Pye 2-track 7-inch single and a CD single which was a replica of the French 4-track EP.) b/w "Act Nice and Gentle"	2007	47	Non-album singles
"Rock 'n' Roll Cowboys" (Ray Davies solo) (Note: Split single Ray Davies / The Kinks.) b/w "Oklahoma U.S.A" (The Kinks)	2017	—	Americana (Ray Davies album)
"Time Song" (Note: Limited edition 7-inch that came with first 1000 copies of the Village Green Preservation Society 50th anniversary super deluxe box set.) b/w "The Village Green Preservation Society" (Preservation Version)	2018	—	Village Green Preservation Society (deluxe edition box set)
"Starstruck" (Alternate Mix)	2018	—	Village Green Preservation Society (deluxe edition box set)
"Days" (Acoustic Version)	2018	—	Village Green Preservation Society (deluxe edition box set)
"Australia" (2019 Mix)	2019	—	Arthur (Or the Decline and Fall of the British Empire) (deluxe edition box set)
"Arthur" (Note: Limited edition Record Store Day Black Friday release of 2500 copies.) b/w "Brainwashed"	2019	—	Non-album singles
"Father Christmas" (2023 Mix)	2023	—	Non-album singles
"You Really Got Me" (Note: 60th anniversary reissue.) b/w "It's All Right"	2024	—	Non-album singles
"—" denotes releases that did not chart or were not released in that territory.

=== Promotional singles ===
Title	Year	Peak chart positions	Album
Title	Year	US Main	Album
"Living on a Thin Line" b/w "Sold Me Out"	1985	24	Word of Mouth
"Did Ya"	1991	48	Did Ya EP
"Hatred (A Duet)"	1993	19	Phobia
"Still Searching"	1993	—	Phobia
"Drift Away"	1993	—	Phobia
"To the Bone"	1996	—	To the Bone
"—" denotes releases that did not chart.

== Videos ==
=== Video albums ===
Title	Album details
One for the Road	Released: November 1983; Label: Vestron Video; Formats: VHS, Betamax
A Virgin Video Music Biography – The Kinks 1964–1984	Released: 1985; Label: Virgin Music Video; Formats: VHS, LD
The Story of the Kinks	Released: 19 May 1986; Label: MGM/UA Home Video; Formats: VHS
Come Dancing with the Kinks	Released: September 1986; Label: RCA/Columbia Pictures Home Video; Formats: VHS, Betamax, LD
Shindig! Presents the Kinks	Released: 7 July 1992; Label: Rhino Home Video; Formats: VHS, LD
Special Edition EP	Released: 11 November 2002; Label: Classic Pictures Entertainment; Formats: DVD
The Live Broadcasts	Released: 2003; Label: Classic Rock Productions; Formats: DVD
Beat Beat Beat	Released: 14 July 2008; Label: ABC Entertainment; Formats: DVD
You Really Got Me – The Story of the Kinks	Released: 12 April 2010; Label: ABC Entertainment; Formats: DVD

=== Music videos ===
Year	Title	Media	Director	Album
1966	"Dead End Street"	B&W film	Paul O'Dell	Non-album singles
1968	"Wonderboy"	B&W film		Non-album singles
1968	"Days"	B&W film		Non-album singles
1968	"Starstruck"	B&W film		The Kinks Are the Village Green Preservation Society
1970	"Apeman"	Colour film		Lola Versus Powerman and the Moneygoround, Part One
1972	"Supersonic Rocket Ship"	B&W film	Laurie Lewis	Everybody's in Showbiz
1973	"Sitting in the Midday Sun"	Colour film		Preservation Act 1
1977	"Father Christmas"	Colour film		Non-album single
1981	"Better Things"	Colour film		Give the People What They Want
1981	"Predictable"	Colour film	Julien Temple	Give the People What They Want
1982	"Come Dancing"	Colour film	Julien Temple	State of Confusion
1983	"Don't Forget to Dance"	Colour film	Julien Temple	State of Confusion
1983	"State of Confusion"	Colour film	Julien Temple	State of Confusion
1984	"Do it Again"	Colour film	Julien Temple	Word of Mouth
1986	"Rock 'n' Roll Cities"	Colour film		Think Visual
1986	"How Are You"	Colour film		Think Visual
1987	"Lost and Found"	Colour film		Think Visual
1988	"The Road"	Colour VT / film	Ray Davies	Live: The Road
1989	"Down All the Days (Till 1992)"	Colour film		UK Jive
1989	"How Do I Get Close"	Colour film		UK Jive
1993	"Only a Dream"	B&W film		Phobia
1993	"Scattered"	Colour film		Phobia
1994	"To the Bone"	Colour film		To the Bone
2018	"Time Song"	Lyric video	Lucy Dawkins and Tom Readdy	Village Green Preservation Society 50th super deluxe box set
2019	"Arthur"; "Australia"; "Shangri-La"	Lyric video / Promotional videos	Lucy Dawkins and Tom Readdy	Arthur 50th anniversary deluxe box set
2020	"Any Time 2020"	B&W film / Lyric video	John Paveley	Lola 50th anniversary deluxe box set
2020	"Powerman 2020 Mix"	Promotional video (Animated)		Lola 50th anniversary deluxe box set
2020	"Lola" (2020 stereo remaster)	Animated (comic style) video	John Paveley and Andy Galloway	Lola 50th anniversary deluxe box set

== Notes ==
Albums

Singles
