= The Essential Kinks =

Compilation album by the Kinks
- Released: 14 October 2014
- Genre: Rock; pop
- Length: 158:54
- Label: Legacy; RCA; Arista
- Producer: Ray Davies; Shel Talmy

The Kinks compilation chronology
Waterloo Sunset: The Very Best of The Kinks & Ray Davies (2012)	The Essential Kinks (2014)	The Journey, Pt. 1 (2023)

The Essential Kinks is a two disc compilation album by English rock band the Kinks, released on 14 October 2014, on Legacy Records, a division of Sony Music Entertainment.

== Background ==
The album celebrates the Kinks' 50th anniversary of their first release with RCA Records. The album includes all the Kinks' biggest hits from 1964 to 1993. It was released as part of Sony's The Essential series and contains 48 tracks. The liner notes were written by David Bowie.

The Davies brothers, who had not played together since 1996, revealed in early 2014 that they had met in person and put their animosity behind them. They were writing new compositions and discussing the possibility of playing together again.

Sony has acquired exclusive licensing to the North American rights to albums made by the Kinks for both RCA Records and Arista between 1971 and 1985. Hi-resolution digital downloads, including Muswell Hillbillies from 1971, Preservation Act 1 from 1973, Preservation Act 2 from 1974, and State of Confusion were released on 9 September 2014.

== Reception ==
Professional ratings
Review scores
Source	Rating
Classic Rock Revisited	B+

- Tony Peters from Iconfetch said, "This marks the first time that the entire Kinks’ 50-year journey has been captured on a single collection. Yet, even if you already own all of their material, you’re going to want this one – the improvement in sound is just that good. The Kinks sound monstrous in this new career-spanning collection. With all the negative talk about the music business lately, it’s easy to overlook the good things still happening. A fine example of this is the recently issued, two-disc set, The Essential Kinks."
- Pat Francis from Pop Culture said, "When a band has 40 years of recorded history under its belt it is almost impossible to whittle that amount of music down to a definitive 2 CD collection but the just released The Essential Kinks comes pretty close. Classics such as 'All Day And All Of The Night,' 'Waterloo Sunset' and 'Picture Book' prove why The Kinks are revered by musicians and music fanatics all over the world."

== Track listing ==
=== Disc one ===
No.	Title	Writer(s)	Album	Length
1.	"You Really Got Me"	Ray Davies	Kinks (1964)	2:13
2.	"Stop Your Sobbing"	Ray Davies	Kinks	2:05
3.	"All Day and All of the Night"	Ray Davies	Kinks-Size (1965)	2:21
4.	"Tired of Waiting for You"	Ray Davies	Kinda Kinks (1965)	2:30
5.	"Nothin' in the World Can Stop Me Worryin' 'Bout That Girl"	Ray Davies	Kinda Kinks	2:43
6.	"Ev'rybody's Gonna Be Happy"	Ray Davies	Kinda Kinks	2:15
7.	"A Well Respected Man"	Ray Davies	Kinkdom (1965)	2:41
8.	"Dedicated Follower of Fashion"	Ray Davies	Kinkdom	3:00
9.	"Who'll Be the Next in Line"	Ray Davies	Non-album single (1965); later appeared on Kinda Kinks as a bonus track	2:01
10.	"Set Me Free"	Ray Davies	Non-album single (1965); later appeared on Kinda Kinks as a bonus track	2:11
11.	"See My Friends"	Ray Davies	Non-album single (1965); later appeared on Kinda Kinks as a bonus track	2:44
12.	"Sunny Afternoon"	Ray Davies	Face to Face (1966)	3:35
13.	"Dead End Street"	Ray Davies	Non-album single (1966); later appeared on Face to Face as a bonus track	3:21
14.	"Death of a Clown"	Ray Davies, Dave Davies	Something Else by the Kinks (1967)	3:12
15.	"Autumn Almanac"	Ray Davies	Non-album single (1967)	3:12
16.	"David Watts"	Ray Davies	Something Else by the Kinks	2:37
17.	"Waterloo Sunset"	Ray Davies	Something Else by the Kinks	3:17
18.	"Days"	Ray Davies	Non-album single (1968); was part of early pressings of The Kinks Are the Village Green Preservation Society (1968) and later appeared as a bonus track	2:52
19.	"The Village Green Preservation Society"	Ray Davies	The Kinks Are the Village Green Preservation Society	2:47
20.	"Do You Remember Walter?"	Ray Davies	The Kinks Are the Village Green Preservation Society	2:24
21.	"Picture Book"	Ray Davies	The Kinks Are the Village Green Preservation Society	2:35
22.	"Victoria"	Ray Davies	Arthur (Or the Decline and Fall of the British Empire) (1969)	3:38
23.	"Apeman"	Ray Davies	Lola Versus Powerman and the Moneygoround, Part One (1970)	3:51
24.	"Strangers"	Dave Davies	Lola Versus Powerman and the Moneygoround, Part One	3:18
25.	"20th Century Man" (US single version)	Ray Davies	Muswell Hillbillies (1971)	4:01
26.	"Supersonic Rocket Ship"	Ray Davies	Everybody's in Show-Biz (1972)	3:30
27.	"Celluloid Heroes" (US single version)	Ray Davies	Everybody's in Show-Biz	4:45

=== Disc two ===
No.	Title	Writer(s)	Album	Length
1.	"Here Comes Yet Another Day"	Ray Davies	Everybody's in Show-Biz	3:54
2.	"You Don’t Know My Name"	Dave Davies	Everybody's in Show-Biz	2:34
3.	"Till the End of the Day" (Live 1972)	Ray Davies	Everybody's in Show-Biz (Legacy Edition) (2016); originally from The Kink Kontroversy (1965)	2:00
4.	"One of the Survivors"	Ray Davies	Preservation Act 1 (1973)	4:03
5.	"Sweet Lady Genevieve"	Ray Davies	Preservation Act 1	3:27
6.	"Everybody's a Star (Starmaker)"	Ray Davies	Soap Opera (1975)	2:59
7.	"Life on the Road"	Ray Davies	Sleepwalker (1977)	5:01
8.	"Sleepwalker"	Ray Davies	Sleepwalker	4:04
9.	"Life Goes On"	Ray Davies	Sleepwalker	5:01
10.	"A Rock 'n' Roll Fantasy" (Single version)	Ray Davies	Misfits (1978)	4:00
11.	"Father Christmas"	Ray Davies	Non-album single (1977)	3:41
12.	"(Wish I Could Fly Like) Superman"	Ray Davies	Low Budget (1979)	3:36
13.	"Lola" (Live 1979)	Ray Davies	One for the Road (1980); originally from Lola Versus Powerman and the Moneygoround, Part One	4:45
14.	"Where Have All the Good Times Gone" (Live 1979)	Ray Davies	One for the Road; originally from The Kink Kontroversy	2:17
15.	"Better Things" (Single version)	Ray Davies	Give the People What They Want (1981)	2:59
16.	"Destroyer"	Ray Davies	Give the People What They Want	3:47
17.	"Come Dancing"	Ray Davies	State of Confusion (1983)	3:55
18.	"Don't Forget to Dance"	Ray Davies	State of Confusion	4:39
19.	"Do It Again"	Ray Davies	Word of Mouth (1984)	4:09
20.	"Living on a Thin Line"	Dave Davies	Word of Mouth	4:14
21.	"Scattered"	Ray Davies	Phobia (1993)	4:10

== Personnel ==
The Kinks

- Ray Davies – vocals, guitar, keyboards
- Dave Davies – vocals, guitar, keyboards
- Pete Quaife – bass (tracks: 1-1 to 1-21)
- Mick Avory – drums (tracks: 1-1 to 1-27, 2-1 to 2-9, 2-11 to 2-18)
- John Dalton – bass (tracks: 1-22 to 1-27, 2-1 to 2-9)
- Andy Pyle – bass (tracks: 2-11)
- Jim Rodford – bass (tracks: 2-12 to 2-21)
- Bob Henrit – drums (tracks: 2-19 to 2-21)
- John Gosling – keyboard (tracks: 1-23 to 1-27, 2-1 to 2-11)
- Ian Gibbons – keyboards (tracks: 2-13 to 2-21)

Additional musicians

- Ron Lawrence – bass (tracks: 2-10)
- Nick Trevisick – drums (tracks: 2-10)
- Nick Newell – keyboards, percussion (tracks: 2-13, 2-14)

== Release history ==
Country	Date	Label	Format	Catalog
United States	2014	RCA Records, Legacy Records	CD, digital download	88843066622 / 88843066622
