= List of the Kinks band members =

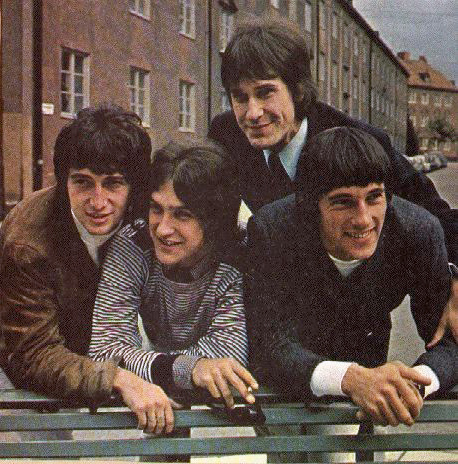
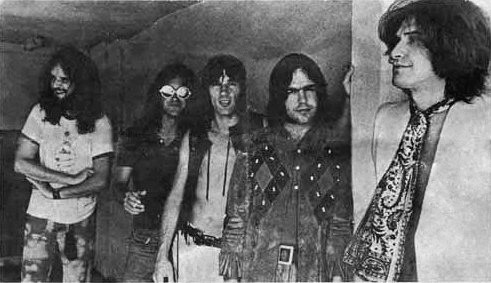
Two lineups of the Kinks in 1965 (top) and 1970 (bottom).

The Kinks are an English rock band from Muswell Hill, London. Formed in January 1963, the group originally comprised the Davies brothers Ray (lead vocals, rhythm guitar) and Dave (lead guitar, vocals), Pete Quaife (bass, backing vocals), and Mick Avory (drums). Quaife left the band for five months from June to November 1966, during which time he was replaced by John Dalton. In April 1969, Quaife left for the second and final time and was once again replaced by Dalton. In May 1970, the Kinks expanded to a five-piece with the addition of John Gosling as their first full-time keyboardist. This lineup remained stable until 1976, when Dalton left. The band underwent several lineup changes during the late 1970s, before stabilizing in late 1979 with a lineup of the Davies brothers, Avory, bassist Jim Rodford and keyboardist Ian Gibbons. After two more studio albums, Avory left the Kinks in July 1984 following numerous conflicts with Dave Davies, which had culminated in his exclusion from the recording of "Good Day" for their then-new album Word of Mouth. He was replaced by Bob Henrit, who completed work on the album. Gibbons left in 1989, with Mark Haley taking his place beginning with the tour in support of UK Jive. Haley remained a touring member, with the 1993 album Phobia recorded as a four-piece.

After a European tour, Haley resigned from the Kinks in July 1993, with Gibbons returning to take his place for US dates two weeks later. The group released a final live album, To the Bone, before disbanding after a final tour ending in June 1996 and appearing for the last time together at Dave Davies’ 50th birthday party in February 1997. In 2018, the Davies brothers announced that they were working on new music together with longtime drummer Mick Avory, however since then there has been no studio release and not much indication the band is active.

== Members ==
=== Former ===
Image	Name	Years active	Instruments	Release contributions
	Ray Davies	1963–1997	lead and backing vocals; rhythm acoustic, electric and resonator guitars; keyboards; piano; harmonica; occasional lead guitar	all Kinks releases to date
	Dave Davies	1963–1997	lead electric, slide and acoustic guitars; backing and lead vocals; banjo; occasional keyboards and piano	all Kinks releases to date
	Mick Avory	1963–1984	drums; percussion	all Kinks releases from Kinks (1964) to State of Confusion (1983); Appearances on individual tracks: Word of Mouth (1984); Think Visual (1986); UK Jive (1989)
	Pete Quaife	1963–1966; 1966–1969 (died 2010)	bass; backing vocals	all Kinks releases from Kinks (1964) to The Kink Kontroversy (1965) and Live at Kelvin Hall (1967) to The Kinks Are the Village Green Preservation Society (1968); Appeareances on individual tracks: Face to Face (1966)
	John "Nobby" Dalton	1966; 1969–1976	bass guitar; backing vocals	all Kinks releases from Arthur (Or the Decline and Fall of the British Empire) (1969) to Sleepwalker (1977); Appearances on individual tracks: Face to Face (1966) and Misfits (1978)
	John "the Baptist" Gosling	1970–1978 (died 2023)	keyboards; piano; backing vocals	all Kinks releases from Lola Versus Powerman and the Moneygoround, Part One (1970) to Misfits (1978)
	Andy Pyle	1976–1978	bass	Misfits (1978); Appearances on individual tracks: Sleepwalker (1977)
	Jim Rodford	1978–1997 (died 2018)	bass; backing vocals	all Kinks releases from Low Budget (1979) to To the Bone (1994)
	Gordon Edwards	1978–1979 (died 2003)	keyboards; piano; backing vocals	Uncredited appearances on individual tracks: Low Budget (1979)
	Ian Gibbons	1979–1989; 1993–1997 (died 2019)	keyboards; piano; backing vocals	all Kinks releases from One for the Road (1980) to UK Jive (1989); To the Bone (1994)
	Bob Henrit	1984–1996	drums; percussion	all Kinks releases from Think Visual (1986) to To the Bone (1994); Appearances on individual tracks: Word of Mouth (1984)
	Mark Haley	1989–1993	keyboards; piano; backing vocals	none

=== Brass section ===
Image	Name	Years active	Instruments	Release contributions
	Mike Cotton	1971–1972; 1977–1978	trumpet	Muswell Hillbillies (1971); Everybody's in Show-Biz (1972); Misfits (1978)
	John Beecham	1971–1976; 1977–1978	trombone; tuba	Muswell Hillbillies (1971); Everybody's in Showbiz (1972); Preservation Act 1 (1973); Preservation Act 2 (1974); Misfits (1978)
	Alan Holmes	1971–1976	saxophone; clarinet	Muswell Hillbillies (1971); Everybody's in Showbiz (1972); Preservation Act 1 (1973); Preservation Act 2 (1974)
	Laurie Brown	1973–1976	trumpet	Preservation Act 1 (1973); Preservation Act 2 (1974)
	Nick Newall	1975–1980 (died 2010)	saxophone; clarinet; keyboards; congas	Misfits (1978); Low Budget (1979); One for the Road (1980)

=== Session musicians ===
Image	Name	Years active	Instruments	Release contributions
	Perry Ford	1964 (died 1999)	piano	Kinks (1964)
	Arthur Greenslade	1964 (died 2003)	piano	Kinks (1964)
	Jon Lord	1964 (died 2012)	organ; piano	Kinks (1964)
	Jimmy Page	1964	twelve-string acoustic guitar	Kinks (1964)
	uncredited musicians	N/A	rhythm guitar; cello; viola; oboe; piccolo; strings	Kinks (1964); Something Else by the Kinks (1967); The Kinks Are the Village Green Preservation Society (1968)
	Rasa Davies (née Didzpetris)	1964–1968	backing vocals	all Kinks releases from Kinks (1964) to The Kinks Are the Village Green Preservation Society (1968)
	Bobby Graham	1964–1965 (died 2009)	drums; percussion	Kinks (1964); Kinda Kinks (1965)
	Nicky Hopkins	1965–1968 (died 1994)	keyboards; piano	all Kinks releases from The Kink Kontroversy (1965) to The Kinks Are the Village Green Preservation Society (1968)
	Clem Cattini	1965; 1977	drums; percussion	The Kink Kontroversy (1965) and overdubs on Misfits (1978)
	Shel Talmy	1965	electric guitar; production	production on all Kinks releases from Kinks (1964) to Something Else by the Kinks (1967); performance on The Kink Kontroversy (1965)
	David Whitaker	1967 (died 2012)	arrangements	Something Else by the Kinks (1967); The Kinks Are the Village Green Preservation Society (1968)
	Stanley Myers	1970 (died 1993)	arrangements	Percy (1971)
	Vicki Brown	1971 (died 1991)	backing vocals	Muswell Hillbillies (1971)
	Ken Jones	1971	harmonica	Muswell Hillbillies (1971)
	Dave Rowberry	1972 (died 2003)	organ	Everybody's in Show-Biz (1972)
	Krysia Kocjan	1973	backing vocals	Preservation Act 1 (1973)
	Lee Pavey	1973	backing vocals	Preservation Act 1 (1973)
	Lewis Rich	1973	backing vocals	Preservation Act 1 (1973)
	Sue Brown	1973–1974	backing vocals	Preservation Act 1 (1973); Preservation Act 2 (1974)
	Pamela Travis	1973–1975	backing vocals	Preservation Act 1 (1973); Preservation Act 2 (1974); Schoolboys in Disgrace (1975)
	Maryann Price	1974	backing vocals	Preservation Act 2 (1974)
	Angi Girton	1974	backing vocals	Preservation Act 2 (1974)
	Christopher Timothy	1974	voice	Preservation Act 2 (1974)
	Chris Musk	1974	voice	Preservation Act 2 (1974)
	June Ritchie	1974	voice	Soap Opera (1975)
	Debbie Doss	1975	backing vocals	Schoolboys in Disgrace (1975)
	Shirley Roden	1975	backing vocals	Schoolboys in Disgrace (1975)
	Nick Trevisik	1977	drums	Misfits (1978)
	Ron Lawrence	1977	bass	Misfits (1978)
	Zaine Griff	1977	bass	Misfits (1978)
	Chrissie Hynde	1979–1981	vocals	Give the People What They Want (1981)
	Kim Goody	1986	backing vocals	Think Visual (1986)

== Lineups ==
Period	Members	Releases
January 1964 – June 1966	Ray Davies – vocals, guitar, keyboards, harmonica; Dave Davies – lead guitar, vocals; Pete Quaife – bass, backing vocals; Mick Avory – drums, percussion	"Long Tall Sally" (1964); "You Still Want Me" (1964); Kinks (1964); "All Day and All of the Night" (1964); Kinksize Session (1964); Kinda Kinks (1965); "Ev'rybody's Gonna Be Happy" (1965); "Set Me Free" (1965); "See My Friends" (1965); Kwyet Kinks (1965); The Kink Kontroversy (1965); "Dedicated Follower of Fashion" (1966); Face to Face (1966) (Quaife departed partway through recording)
June – November 1966	Ray Davies – vocals, guitar, keyboards, harmonica; Dave Davies – lead guitar, vocals; Mick Avory – drums, percussion; John Dalton – bass, backing vocals	Face to Face (1966) (completed by this lineup); "Dead End Street" (1966)
November 1966 – April 1969	Ray Davies – vocals, guitar, keyboards, harmonica; Dave Davies – lead guitar, vocals; Mick Avory – drums, percussion; Pete Quaife – bass, backing vocals	Live at Kelvin Hall (1967); Something Else by The Kinks (1967); "Autumn Almanac" (1967); "Wonderboy" (1968); "Days" (1968); The Kinks Are the Village Green Preservation Society (1968); "Plastic Man" (1969)
April 1969 – April 1970	Ray Davies – vocals, guitar, keyboards, harmonica; Dave Davies – lead guitar, vocals; Mick Avory – drums, percussion; John Dalton – bass, backing vocals	Arthur (Or the Decline and Fall of the British Empire) (1969)
April 1970 – November 1976	Ray Davies – vocals, guitar, keyboards, harmonica; Dave Davies – lead guitar, vocals; Mick Avory – drums, percussion; John Dalton – bass, backing vocals; John Gosling – keyboards, piano, backing vocals	Lola Versus Powerman and the Moneygoround (1970); Percy (1971); Muswell Hillbillies (1971); Everybody's in Show-Biz (1972); Preservation Act 1 (1973); Preservation Act 2 (1974); Soap Opera (1975); Schoolboys in Disgrace (1975); Sleepwalker (1977) (Dalton departed partway through recording)
November 1976 – January 1978	Ray Davies – vocals, guitar, keyboards, harmonica; Dave Davies – lead guitar, vocals; Mick Avory – drums, percussion; John Gosling – keyboards, piano, backing vocals; Andy Pyle – bass	Sleepwalker (1977) (completed by this lineup); "Father Christmas" (1977); Misfits (1978)
January 1978 – June 1979	Ray Davies – vocals, guitar, keyboards, harmonica; Dave Davies – lead guitar, vocals; Mick Avory – drums, percussion; Jim Rodford – bass, backing vocals; Gordon Edwards – keyboards, piano, backing vocals	Low Budget (1979)
June 1979 – July 1984	Ray Davies – vocals, guitar, keyboards, harmonica; Dave Davies – lead guitar, vocals; Mick Avory – drums, percussion; Jim Rodford – bass, backing vocals; Ian Gibbons – keyboards, piano, backing vocals	One for the Road (1980); Give the People What They Want (1981); State of Confusion (1983); Word of Mouth (1984) (Avory departed partway through recording)
July 1984 – April 1989	Ray Davies – vocals, guitar, keyboards, harmonica; Dave Davies – lead guitar, vocals; Jim Rodford – bass, backing vocals; Ian Gibbons – keyboards, piano, backing vocals; Bob Henrit – drums, percussion	Word of Mouth (1984) (completed by this lineup); Think Visual (1986); The Road (1986); UK Jive (1989)
April 1989 – July 1993	Ray Davies – vocals, guitar, keyboards, harmonica; Dave Davies – lead guitar, vocals; Jim Rodford – bass, backing vocals; Bob Henrit – drums, percussion; Mark Haley – keyboards, piano, backing vocals	Phobia (1993)
July 1993 – December 1997	Ray Davies – vocals, guitar, keyboards, harmonica; Dave Davies – lead guitar, vocals; Jim Rodford – bass, backing vocals; Bob Henrit – drums, percussion; Ian Gibbons – keyboards, piano, backing vocals	To The Bone (UK 1994, US 1996)
