= The Kinks Greatest Hits! =

1966 greatest hits album by the Kinks

Greatest hits album by the Kinks
- Released: 10 August 1966
- Recorded: July 1964 – February 1966
- Studio: Pye and IBC, London
- Genre: Pop; rock and roll
- Length: 23:54
- Label: Reprise
- Producer: Shel Talmy

The Kinks US chronology
The Kink Kontroversy (1966)	The Kinks Greatest Hits! (1966)	Face to Face (1966)

The Kinks Greatest Hits! (also spelled The Kinks' Greatest Hits!) (Note: The title includes the apostrophe on the spine of the album sleeve, but it is omitted on the LP's label and on the sleeve's front and back.) is a compilation album by the English rock band the Kinks. Released in the United States in August 1966 by Reprise Records, the album mostly consists of singles issued by the group between 1964 and 1966. The band's first greatest hits album, it remained on the Billboard Top LPs chart for over a year, peaking at number 9, making it the Kinks' highest charting album in the US. The album was in print for decades and was the Kinks' only gold record in America until 1980.

== Release ==
Reprise Records released The Kinks Greatest Hits! in the US on 10 August 1966. (Note: Author Thomas M. Kitts wrote in 2002 that the album was released on 12 August 1966, while Kinks researcher Doug Hinman wrote in 2004 that it was the 10th.) The band's first greatest hits album, it mostly consists of singles issued by the group between 1964 and 1966, ranging from "You Really Got Me" to "Dedicated Follower of Fashion", recorded in mid-July 1964 and February 1966, respectively. All the tracks were recorded at Pye or IBC Studios in London and were produced by Shel Talmy. "Something Better Beginning" is the only non-single on the album, first issued on Kinda Kinks (1965).

The album's liner notes include one of the earliest instances of Ray Davies, the Kinks' principal songwriter, being characterised as a genius. Author Thomas. M. Kitts suggests the description of Davies as "a brooding-faced, long-haired genius" was an attempt to connect him to the English poet Lord Byron. Eder writes that Ed Thrasher's cover art for the album, depicting the band in several concert photographs, further added to its collectibility.

== Commercial performance and reception ==
Retrospective professional ratings
Review scores
Source	Rating
AllMusic	4.5/5 stars
Encyclopedia of Popular Music	4/5 stars
The Great Rock Discography	8/10 stars

Like subsequent British compilations collecting the Kinks' mid-1960s hits, the album's sales surpassed those of the band's late 1960s studio albums. (Note: The album sold over 200,000 copies by 1969. By comparison, Something Else by the Kinks (1968) and The Kinks Are the Village Green Preservation Society (1969) sold a combined 25,000 copies in America.) It remained on the Billboard Top LPs chart for 64 weeks, peaking in November 1966 at number 9, making it the Kinks' highest charting album in the US. It additionally reached number 13 and 8 on Cash Box and Record World's charts, respectively. RIAA certified it gold in November 1968, indicating retail sales of US$1 million (equivalent to US$9 million in 2024). The album remained in print for around 20 years and was the Kinks' only American gold record until Low Budget's (1979) certification in 1980.

Crawdaddy magazine critic Sandy Pearlman contemporaneously described it as among the best greatest hits albums available. Authors Steve Alleman and Bruce Eder each retrospectively write that the album's joining of various styles served to indicate the Kinks' earliest musical developments, though Eder suggests the album's shortcoming is its omission of the band's later 1966 songs, like "Sunny Afternoon" and "Dandy". Critic Robert Christgau included the album in his "Basic Record Library" of 1950s and 1960s recordings, published in his book Christgau's Record Guide: Rock Albums of the Seventies (1981).

== Track listing ==
All songs by Ray Davies.

Side one

1. "You Really Got Me" – 2:20
2. "Tired of Waiting for You" – 2:30
3. "Set Me Free" – 2:10
4. "Something Better Beginning" – 2:23
5. "Who'll Be the Next in Line" – 1:59

Side two

1. "Till the End of the Day" – 2:20
2. "Dedicated Follower of Fashion" – 2:59
3. "A Well Respected Man" – 2:38
4. "Ev'rybody's Gonna Be Happy" – 2:15
5. "All Day and All of the Night" – 2:20

== Personnel ==
According to band researcher Doug Hinman, except where noted:

The Kinks

- Ray Davies – lead vocals; electric and acoustic rhythm guitars; piano ("Something Better Beginning", "Ev'rybody's Gonna Be Happy")
- Dave Davies – backing vocals, electric lead guitar
- Pete Quaife – backing vocals, bass
- Mick Avory – drums; tambourine ("You Really Got Me", "Till the End of the Day", "All Day and All of the Night")

Additional musicians

- Clem Cattini – drums ("Till the End of the Day")
- Rasa Davies – backing vocals ("Something Better Beginning", "Set Me Free", "Till the End of the Day", "Ev'rybody's Gonna Be Happy")
- Perry Ford – piano ("All Day and All of the Night")
- Bobby Graham – drums ("You Really Got Me", "Tired of Waiting for You", "All Day and All of the Night")
- Arthur Greenslade – piano ("You Really Got Me")
- Nicky Hopkins – piano ("Till the End of the Day", "Dedicated Follower of Fashion")
- Unidentified girlfriends of the Kinks – backing vocals ("Ev'rybody's Gonna Be Happy")
- Unidentified session musician (Note: Hinman writes a guitarist from Edward Kassner's office played additional rhythm guitar on "You Really Got Me", "likely Harry, possibly Bob or Vic, surname unknown".) – rhythm guitar ("You Really Got Me")

Production and additional personnel

- Bob Auger – engineering
- Glyn Johns – engineering ("You Really Got Me")
- Alan MacKenzie – engineering ("Till the End of the Day", "Dedicated Follower of Fashion", "A Well Respected Man")
- Shel Talmy – producer
- Ed Thrasher – art direction

== Charts and certifications ==
Weekly chart performance
Chart (1966–1967)	Peak position
US Billboard Top LPs	9
US Cash Box Top 100 Albums	13
US Record World Album Chart	8

Year-end chart performance
Chart (1966)	Ranking
US Cash Box	83

Certifications for The Kinks Greatest Hits!
Region	Certification	Certified units/sales
United States (RIAA)	Gold	$1,000,000
