= Sunny Afternoon (musical) =

- West End production poster
- Music: Ray Davies
- Lyrics: Ray Davies
- Book: Joe Penhall
- Basis: The formation and career of The Kinks
- Premiere: 1 May 2014: Hampstead Theatre
- Productions: 2014 Hampstead Theatre; 2014 West End; 2016 UK Tour; 2025 Chicago Shakespeare Theater; 2025 UK Tour
- Awards: Laurence Olivier Award for Best New Musical

Sunny Afternoon is a jukebox musical with music and lyrics by Ray Davies and a book by Joe Penhall. Based on the formation and career of the English rock band the Kinks, the musical was commissioned and produced by Sonia Friedman and made its world premiere in 2014 at the Hampstead Theatre, London, before transferring to the West End's Harold Pinter Theatre. Featuring songs by the Kinks, Sunny Afternoon includes their hits such as "Lola", "Waterloo Sunset", "You Really Got Me", and the musical's title song, "Sunny Afternoon".

== Background ==
In 2013 producer Sonia Friedman officially confirmed that a musical based around the early life of Ray Davies and the formation of the Kinks would receive its world premiere at the Hampstead Theatre in spring 2014. The musical is named after the band's 1966 hit single "Sunny Afternoon" and features songs from the band's back catalogue. The musical has a book by Joe Penhall and was directed by Edward Hall, with choreography by Adam Cooper, set and costume design by Miriam Buether, lighting design by Rick Fisher, sound design by Matt McKenzie, and musical direction by Elliott Ware.

== Production history ==
=== Original London production (2014–16) ===
The musical's world premiere production began previews at the Hampstead Theatre in London in April 2014, with its official opening night on 1 May, booking for a limited run until 24 May 2014.

In late June, it was confirmed that the production would transfer to the West End, beginning previews at the Harold Pinter Theatre on 4 October, with an official opening night on 28 October. Tickets for the transfer went on sale on 30 June. Shortly after beginning previews the show extended booking to January, before quickly announcing another extension to 23 May 2015. On 14 November 2014, the cast appeared on the BBC's Children In Need, closing the show. The musical closed on 29 October 2016.

A typical performance ran two hours and 45 minutes, including one interval.

=== Tours ===
The production embarked on its first UK and Ireland tour opening at the Manchester Opera House in August 2016 ending at the Grand Opera House, Belfast in June 2017. A second UK and Ireland tour was due to open again at the Manchester Opera House in August 2020, but was cancelled due to the COVID-19 pandemic. It was eventually announced to begin in Manchester from October 2025, touring until May 2026.

The production made its North American premiere at the Chicago Shakespeare Theater from March 2025 running until April 2025, also directed by Edward Hall.

== Synopsis ==
The semi-biographical story is set against the background of political and social change of the 1960s. The musical examines the early years of the Muswell Hill, London-based group the Kinks. After initial failure, the band's lead guitarist Dave Davies experimented and created a distorted power chord sound on the group's third single, "You Really Got Me". The song, written by Dave's older brother Ray, went to No 1 in the UK charts and preceded a string of hits. Woven into the musical are the themes of the Davies brothers' sibling rivalry, management problems, their sister's untimely death, Ray's doomed marriage, and their subsequent banning from the United States following a dispute with the musicians' union.

== Music ==
=== Musical numbers ===
Act I

- "You Still Want Me"
- "I Gotta Move/You Really Got Me"
- "Just Can't Go To Sleep"
- "Denmark Street"
- "A Well Respected Man"
- "Dead End Street"
- "Dedicated Follower of Fashion"
- "You Really Got Me"
- "(This Time Tomorrow into) Set Me Free"
- "Till the End of the Day"
- "This Strange Effect"
- "Tell Me Now So I'll Know" (Instrumental)
- "Stop Your Sobbing"
- "This is Where I Belong"
- "Where Have All the Good Times Gone/All Day and All of the Night"

Act II

- "This Time Tomorrow"
- "Maximum Consumption"
- "Sitting in My Hotel"
- "I Go to Sleep"
- "I'm Not Like Everybody Else"
- "Too Much On My Mind/Tired of Waiting"
- "The Moneygoround"
- "Sunny Afternoon"
- "A Rock 'N' Roll Fantasy"
- "Days"
- "A Long Way From Home"
- "Waterloo Sunset"
- "Lola"
- "All Day and All of the Night/You Really Got Me/Lola"

=== Recordings ===
On 21 October 2014, four preview tracks from the album, "Dedicated Follower of Fashion", "Dead End Street", "Too Much On My Mind/Tired of Waiting" and the show's title song "Sunny Afternoon" were released via SoundCloud. Recorded at London's Konk Studio's, which was established by the Kinks, the album of 29 songs was released on 27 October via BMG Chrysalis.

Sunny Afternoon

Soundtrack album cast recording by Various
- Released: 27 October 2014
- Genre: Rock
- Length: 1:01:13
- Label: BMG Chrysalis

No.	Title	Length
1.	"You Still Want Me"	1.49
2.	"I Gotta Move/You Really Got Me"	2.04
3.	"Just Can't Go to Sleep"	1.03
4.	"Denmark Street"	2.08
5.	"A Well Respected Man"	2.32
6.	"Dead End Street"	2.22
7.	"Dedicated Follower of Fashion"	2.29
8.	"You Really Got Me"	2.13
9.	"(This Time Tomorrow into) Set Me Free"	2.57
10.	"Till the End of the Day"	2.01
11.	"This Strange Effect"	1.47
12.	"Stop Your Sobbing"	1.43
13.	"This Is Where I Belong"	1.07
14.	"Where Have All the Good Times Gone/All Day and All of the Night"	3.11
15.	"This Time Tomorrow"	2.12
16.	"Maximum Consumption"	0.58
17.	"Sitting in My Hotel"	3.31
18.	"I Go to Sleep"	2.29
19.	"I'm Not Like Everybody Else"	1.46
20.	"Too Much on My Mind/Tired of Waiting"	2.20
21.	"The Moneygoround"	1.47
22.	"Sunny Afternoon"	3.34
23.	"A Rock 'N' Roll Fantasy"	3.00
24.	"Days"	2.21
25.	"A Long Way from Home"	2.35
26.	"Waterloo Sunset"	3.20
27.	"Lola"	2.25
28.	"All Day and All of the Night/You Really Got Me/Lola"	2.37
29.	"Look a Little on the Sunny Side"	1.32

== Principal roles and original cast ==
Character	Hampstead	West End	UK and Ireland tour	Chicago
Character	2014		2016	2025
Ray Davies	John Dagleish	John Dagleish	Ryan O'Donnell	Danny Horn
Dave Davies	George Maguire	George Maguire	Mark Newnham	Oliver Hoare
Pete Quaife	Ned Derrington	Ned Derrington	Garmon Rhys	Michael Lepore
Mick Avory	Adam Sopp	Adam Sopp	Andrew Gallo	Kieran McCabe
Mr Davies/Allen Klein	Philip Bird	Philip Bird	Robert Took	John Carlin
Mrs Davies/Marsha	Helen Hobson	Elizabeth Hill	Deryn Edwards	Marya Grandy
Larry Page	Vince Leigh	Vince Leigh	Richard Hurst	Sean Fortunato
Eddie Kassner	Ben Caplan	Ben Caplan	Michael Warburton	Joseph Papke
Rasa	Lillie Flynn	Lillie Flynn	Lisa Wright	Ana Margaret Marcu
Gregory Piven	Marvin Springer	Ashley Campbell	Nathanael Campbell	Jared D.M. Grant
Robert Wace	Dominic Tighe	Dominic Tighe	Joseph Richardson	Ben Mayne
Greenville Collins	Tam Williams	Tam Williams	Tomm Coles	Will Leonard
Gwen	Carly Anderson	Carly Anderson	Victoria Anderson	Kayla Shipman
Peggy	Emily Goodenough	Emily Goodenough	Libby Watts	Emma Grace Bailey
Joyce	Amy Ross	Amy Ross	Sophie Leigh-Griffin	Joy Campbell
Alternate Ray	—N/a	James Hudson	—N/a	—N/a

== Awards and nominations ==
=== Original London production ===
Year	Award	Category	Nominee	Result	Ref
2014	Evening Standard Awards	Ned Sherrin Award For Best Musical		Nominated	
2014	Evening Standard Awards	Emerging Talent Award	John Dagleish	Nominated	
2015	Whatsonstage.com Awards	Best New Musical		Nominated	
2015	Whatsonstage.com Awards	Best Supporting Actor In A Musical	George Maguire	Nominated	
2015	Laurence Olivier Award	Best New Musical		Won	
2015	Laurence Olivier Award	Best Actor in a Musical	John Dagleish	Won	
2015	Laurence Olivier Award	Best Actor in a Supporting Role in a Musical	George Maguire	Won	
2015	Laurence Olivier Award	Best Sound Design	Matt McKenzie	Nominated	
2015	Laurence Olivier Award	Outstanding Achievement in Music	Ray Davies	Won	
