= Sunny Afternoon (album) =

Compilation album by the Kinks
- Released: 17 November 1967
- Recorded: 1964–1966
- Studio: Pye, London
- Genre: Rock
- Label: Marble Arch
- Producer: Shel Talmy

The Kinks UK chronology
Something Else by the Kinks (1967)	Sunny Afternoon (1967)	Live at Kelvin Hall (1968)

Sunny Afternoon is the second UK budget-priced compilation album by British rock group the Kinks released in 1967. The album consists of some of the most popular singles and B-sides released by the Kinks from 1965 and 1966. It also includes a cover of "Louie Louie", originally from the 1964 Kinksize Session EP, and the track "Such A Shame" from the 1965 Kwyet Kinks EP.

Released two months after the classic studio album Something Else by the Kinks, which itself only managed two weeks on the UK charts peaking at No. 35, this budget compilation sold much better, spending 11 weeks on the chart and reaching No. 9.

The album was issued on CD in 2001 as part of the Marble Arch Years boxed set.

== Track listing ==
All songs by Ray Davies, except "Louie Louie" by Richard Berry.

Side one

1. "Sunny Afternoon"
2. "I Need You"
3. "See My Friends"
4. "Big Black Smoke"
5. "Louie Louie"

Side two

1. "Dedicated Follower of Fashion"
2. "Sittin' on My Sofa"
3. "Such a Shame"
4. "I'm Not Like Everybody Else"
5. "Dead End Street"

== Charts ==
Weekly chart performance for Sunny Afternoon
Chart (1967)	Peak position
UK Record Retailer LPs Chart	9
UK Melody Maker Top Ten LPs	9
UK New Musical Express Top 15 LPs	10
