= Who'll Be the Next in Line =

"Who'll Be the Next In Line"
- US A-side label

Single by the Kinks
- A-side: "Ev'rybody's Gonna Be Happy" (UK)
- B-side: "Ev'rybody's Gonna Be Happy" (US)
- Released: 19 March 1965
- Recorded: 22–23 December 1964
- Studio: Pye, London
- Genre: Garage rock; R&B
- Length: 2:02
- Label: Pye (UK); Reprise (US)
- Songwriter: Ray Davies
- Producer: Shel Talmy

The Kinks UK singles chronology
"Tired of Waiting for You" (1965)	"Ev'rybody's Gonna Be Happy" / "Who'll Be the Next In Line" (1965)	"Set Me Free" (1965)

The Kinks US singles chronology
"Set Me Free" (1965)	"Who'll Be the Next In Line" / "Ev'rybody's Gonna Be Happy" (1965)	"See My Friends" (1965)

"Who'll Be the Next in Line" is a song by the English rock band the Kinks, written by the groups primary songwriter Ray Davies and was released in 1965.

== Release ==
"Who'll Be the Next in Line" was first released as the B-side to "Ev'rybody's Gonna Be Happy", a Kinks single released in Britain. However, that song's chart performance in the UK was a disappointing No. 17, breaking a string of top-ten hits for the Kinks. Reprise felt that the "Ev'rybody's Gonna Be Happy" single was unfit for release in America. The subsequent single, "Set Me Free", was released, but after The Kinks' next proposed single, "See My Friends", was sent to Reprise, they decided to release the "Ev'rybody's Gonna Be Happy" single with "Who'll Be the Next in Line" as the A-side. The single charted, hitting No. 34, which was more successful than the following "See My Friends", which only hit No. 111. "Who'll Be the Next in Line" also appeared as a bonus track on the 1998 CD reissue of Kinda Kinks.

Billboard described the song as a "pulsating funky blues rhythm number which rocks all the way". Cashbox described it as a "fast-moving, rollicking thumper about a fella who has plenty of regrets about his romantic involvements".

== Personnel ==
According to band researcher Doug Hinman:

The Kinks

- Ray Davies – lead vocal, piano
- Dave Davies – electric guitar
- Pete Quaife – bass guitar
- Mick Avory – drums
