= Gordon John Edwards =

Musical artist (1947–2003)

- Born: 26 December 1947; Southport, England, UK
- Died: 28 February 2003 (aged 55) Greenford, England, UK
- Genres: Rock
- Instruments: Keyboards, guitar, bass, vocals
- Formerly of: Pretty Things, The Kinks

Gordon John Edwards (26 December 1947 — 28 February 2003) was a British pianist. He was a member of The Kinks from 1978 to 1979.

Edwards was born in Southport on boxing day 1947. His mother played the organ in a Welsh chapel and taught him to sing and to play. He was a guitarist and pianist for Pretty Things from 1973 to 1976, and performed on their Silk Torpedo album. He joined The Kinks in 1978 but was fired a few months later for failing to show up at the airport to fly to New York to record. Edwards is credited with playing the piano on "Low Budget" a song from their 1979 album of the same name.

Edwards suffered from drug addicition and depression and took his own life in Greenford in 2003. He was buried at an unmarked grave at Llanharan cemetery until 2017 when his niece, Melanie, set up a GoFundMe to pay for a headstone.
