= Sunny Afternoon =

- West German picture sleeve

Single by the Kinks

from the album Face to Face
- B-side: "I'm Not Like Everybody Else"
- Released: 3 June 1966
- Recorded: 13 May 1966
- Studio: Pye, London
- Genre: Pop; rock; music hall
- Length: 3:36
- Label: Pye (UK); Reprise (US)
- Songwriter: Ray Davies
- Producer: Shel Talmy

The Kinks singles chronology
"Dedicated Follower of Fashion" (1966)	"Sunny Afternoon" (1966)	"Dead End Street" (1966)

Music video
- "Sunny Afternoon" on YouTube

"Sunny Afternoon" is a song by the Kinks, written by Ray Davies and released as a single in June 1966. The track was included on the Face to Face album released in late October, and served as the title track for a 1967 compilation album. Like its contemporary "Taxman" by the Beatles, the song references the high levels of progressive tax taken by the British Labour government of Harold Wilson, although it does so through the lens of an unsympathetic aristocrat bemoaning the loss of his vast unearned wealth. Its strong music hall flavour and lyrical focus was part of a stylistic departure for the band (begun with 1965's "A Well Respected Man"), which had risen to fame in 1964–65 with a series of hard-driving, power-chord rock hits.

== Background ==
"Sunny Afternoon" was written in Ray Davies' house when he was ill. He recalled:

I'd bought a white upright piano. I hadn't written for a time. I'd been ill. I was living in a very 1960s-decorated house. It had orange walls and green furniture. My one-year-old daughter was crawling on the floor and I wrote the opening riff. I remember it vividly. I was wearing a polo-neck sweater.

Davies used the song's narrator to reflect on his own situation in the song's lyrics: "The only way I could interpret how I felt was through a dusty, fallen aristocrat who had come from old money as opposed to the wealth I had created for myself." In order to prevent the listener from sympathizing with the song's protagonist, Davies said, "I turned him into a scoundrel who fought with his girlfriend after a night of drunkenness and cruelty."

Davies explained of the circumstances in which the song was written and recorded:

"Sunny Afternoon" was made very quickly, in the morning, it was one of our most atmospheric sessions. I still like to keep tapes of the few minutes before the final take, things that happen before the session. Maybe it's superstitious, but I believe if I had done things differently—if I had walked around the studio or gone out—it wouldn't have turned out that way. The bass player went off and started playing funny little classical things on the bass, more like a lead guitar: and Nicky Hopkins, who was playing piano on that session, was playing "Liza"—we always used to play that song—little things like that helped us get into the feeling of the song. At the time I wrote "Sunny Afternoon" I couldn't listen to anything. I was only playing the greatest hits of Frank Sinatra and Dylan's "Maggie's Farm"—I just liked its whole presence, I was playing the Bringing It All Back Home LP along with my Frank Sinatra and Glenn Miller and Bach—it was a strange time. I thought they all helped one another, they went into the chromatic part that's in the back of the song. I once made a drawing of my voice on "Sunny Afternoon". It was a leaf with a very thick outline—a big blob in the background—the leaf just cutting through it.

== Release and reception ==
Released as a single on 3 June 1966, "Sunny Afternoon" went to number one on the UK Singles Chart on 7 July 1966, remaining there for two weeks. The track also went to number one in Ireland on 14 July 1966. In America, it peaked at number 14 on the Billboard Hot 100 pop singles chart early autumn 1966. The promotional video for the single featured the band performing in a cold, snowy environment.

In a 1995 interview, Ray Davies recalled being surprised at the song's broad appeal, stating, "'Sunny Afternoon', I remember the record coming out and I walked into a British Legion or a pub. I thought I was in a British Legion. All these people, old soldiers and things, singing it. I was 23 years old. I said, 'Wow, all these old people really like it.' And this old guy came up and said, 'You young guys ... this is the sort of music we can relate to!' I thought, Wow, this is it, it's the end (laughs)."

Billboard praised the single's "off-beat music hall melody and up-to-date lyrics". Cash Box said that it is a "slow-moving, blues-drenched, seasonal affair with a catchy, low-key repeating riff". "Sunny Afternoon" was placed at No. 200 on Pitchfork Media's list of The 200 Greatest Songs of the 1960s. The song was featured in and was the title song of West End musical Sunny Afternoon. It has been covered by artists including Jimmy Buffett, Stereophonics, Michael McDonald, Michael Caruso, and Nellie McKay. The song featured in the 2023 film Perfect Days and the 2025 series The Girlfriend.

== Charts and certifications ==
=== Weekly charts ===
Chart (1966)	Peak position
Australia (Go-Set)	37
Australia (Kent Music Report)	13
Austria (Ö3 Austria Top 40)	5
Belgium (Ultratop 50 Flanders)	14
Belgium (Ultratop 50 Wallonia)	11
Canada Top Singles (RPM)	1
Denmark (Danmarks Radio)	3
Finland (Suomen virallinen lista)	7
France (IFOP)	11
Germany (GfK)	7
Ireland (IRMA)	1
Italy (Musica e dischi)	12
Netherlands (Dutch Top 40)	1
Netherlands (Single Top 100)	1
New Zealand (Listener)	2
Norway (VG-lista)	1
South Africa (Springbok)	15
Spain (PROMUSICAE)	10
Sweden (Kvällstoppen)	2
Sweden (Tio i Topp)	2
UK Singles (Official Charts)	1
US Billboard Hot 100	14
US Cash Box Top 100	11

=== Year-end charts ===
Chart (1966)	Rank
Australia (Kent Music Report)	80
Belgium (Ultratop Flanders)	90
UK Singles (Official Charts Company)	8
US (Joel Whitburn's Pop Annual)	154

=== Certifications ===
Region	Certification	Certified units/sales
United Kingdom (BPI)	Gold	400,000^{‡}
^{‡} Sales+streaming figures based on certification alone.

== Personnel ==
According to band researcher Doug Hinman, except where noted:

The Kinks

- Ray Davies – lead and backing vocals, twelve-string acoustic rhythm guitar
- Dave Davies – backing vocal, electric guitar
- Pete Quaife – bass guitar
- Mick Avory – drums

Additional musicians

- Rasa Davies – backing vocal
- Nicky Hopkins – piano, melodica
