= See My Friends =

- Danish picture sleeve

Single by the Kinks
- B-side: "Never Met a Girl Like You Before"
- Released: 30 July 1965
- Recorded: 3 May 1965
- Studio: Pye, London
- Genre: Raga rock; pop; rock; R&B
- Length: 2:44
- Label: Pye (UK); Reprise (US)
- Songwriter: Ray Davies
- Producer: Shel Talmy

The Kinks UK singles chronology
"Set Me Free" (1965)	"See My Friends" (1965)	"Till the End of the Day" (1965)

The Kinks US singles chronology
"Who'll Be the Next in Line" (1965)	"See My Friends" (1965)	"A Well Respected Man" (1965)

"See My Friends" (sometimes titled "See My Friend") (Note: The song is identified as "See My Friend" on the initial UK single pressing. The publisher Kassner Music, which owns the publishing rights to the song, specifies the title as "See My Friends". Most subsequent issues of the track have used the more familiar "See My Friends" title.) is a song by the English rock band the Kinks, written by the group's singer and guitarist, Ray Davies. Released in July 1965, it reached number 10 on the Record Retailer chart. The song incorporates a drone-effect played on guitar, evoking a sound reminiscent of the Indian tambura.

"See My Friends" is one of the key early works in the style known as raga rock. Music historian Jonathan Bellman sees it as the first Western rock song to integrate Indian raga sounds, citing its release four months ahead of the Beatles' "Norwegian Wood (This Bird Has Flown)", which includes a sitar part. However, Davies biographer Johnny Rogan comments that a preceding single release ("Heart Full of Soul" by the Yardbirds) was "pre-empting Davies's innovative use of Indian music".

== Background and inspiration ==
In his interviews at the time of the song's release, Ray Davies told journalists Maureen Cleave and Keith Altham that "See My Friends" was about homosexuality. He told Cleave that it was "about being a youth who is not sure of his identity", a feeling he had experienced, and recalled that he once said to wife Rasa, "If it wasn't for you, I'd be queer." He has also said the song concerns the death of his elder sister, Rene, who lived for a time in Ontario, Canada. On returning to England, she fell ill owing to an undiagnosed hole in her heart and died while dancing at a nightclub. Just before Rene died, according to Davies, she gave him his first guitar for his thirteenth birthday.

Inspiration for the song came from a stopover in Bombay in late January 1965, while the Kinks were en route to Australia. Early one morning, Davies heard a group of fishermen on the beach by the band's hotel, chanting as they took their nets out. This chant became very personal to Davies, reaching into his soul. He recalled that once the band arrived in Australia for their tour, he began working on several new songs, particularly "See My Friends". Davies said of the effect of his stopover in Bombay: "I always liked the chanting. Someone once said to me, 'England is grey and India is like a chant.' I don't think England is that grey but India is like a long drone. When I wrote the song, I had the sea near Bombay in mind."

Shel Talmy, the Kinks' producer during the early part of their career, has said that "See My Friends" was inspired by Jon Mark. Talmy believed that Davies only adopted Indian influences in his songwriting after hearing a Mark recording that Talmy played him and offered as a model for the style.

== Recording ==
Kinks biographer Doug Hinman provides some detail on the recording sessions at Pye Studios, London:

Monday 3rd [May 1965] ... the band returns to Pye to re-record "See My Friends", first tried at the April 13th–14th sessions. The issued "See My Friends" exhibits a good deal of tape hiss, due to multiple overdubs and running the recording through a compressor for effect. The song features Ray or Dave [Davies] on a 12-string guitar, played close to the amp to achieve the droning feedback effect.

Ray Davies recalled he was keen to achieve "this little feedback sound" on his Framus 12-string. He added that the recording was heavily limited with compression, which resulted in a "wonderfully squashed ... surging" quality. According to Peter Lavezzoli in his book The Dawn of Indian Music in the West, it was Talmy who suggested the band add the droning effect. He said the sound was created using two six-string electric guitars, each playing the E♭ chord's tonic and fifth notes.

The song uses the droning major chord over most of its verse section, with a harmonic change occurring at the end. The bridge sections adopt a more varied chord progression, thereby departing from Indian musical form. Davies furthered the song's Indian mood in his style of singing. In Lavezzoli's description, his "nasal lead vocal" suggests an attempt to "sing a raga" over the droning guitars.

== Release ==
While Davies and Talmy wanted "See My Friends" to be the Kinks' next single, Larry Page, the group's former producer, planned to release the previously recorded "Ring the Bells". A battle of wills ensued between Page and Talmy. The latter prevailed, having initiated legal proceedings to prevent Page from releasing earlier material by the band. The single was eventually released in the United Kingdom on 30 July 1965. (Note: Catalogue number Pye 7N 15919.) "Never Met a Girl Like You Before", recorded a month before "See My Friends" was used as the B-side. Reprise Records released the single in United States on 29 September 1965, (Note: Catalogue number Reprise 0409.) and it was included on the US-only album Kinkdom later in the year. It has since been reissued on the 1998 CD release of Kinda Kinks.

The single was afforded a lukewarm reception at the time. Davies expressed disappointment at this, saying: "[It's] the only one I've really liked, and they're not buying it. You know, I put everything I've got into it ... It makes me think they must be morons or something. Look, I'm not a great singer, nor a great writer, not a great musician. But I do give everything I have ... and I did for this disc." "See My Friends" was reviewed unfavourably by Altham in the NME, and Altham was similarly intolerant of Davies' comments to him concerning duality and bisexuality. Davies later said that opposition to the song may have been beneficial, assuring it a level of "notoriety". More impressed, Billboard's reviewer described the song as an "exciting and intriguing slow rhythm number that will fast spiral up the chart". In Cash Box, it was described as a "rhythmic, medium-paced blues-tinged romantic weeper essayed with loads of poise and authority". Record World said that it has a "folk-rock sound that ought to get [the Kinks] listens".

"See My Friends" spent nine weeks on the Record Retailer chart (later the UK Singles Chart), where it peaked at number 10 on 8 September. It was one of the band's lowest-charting singles during this period of the 1960s; Talmy attributed this to the song being "so far ahead of the market". The single also reached numbers 36 in West Germany, 26 in the Netherlands, and 19 in Sweden.

== Contemporary influence and legacy ==
One thing does bother me – we didn't get any credit for making a very Indian sounding record with "See My Friend". Since then over the last six months, groups have all been doing this Indian thing.

— Dave Davies, July 1966

Lavezzoli recognises "See My Friends" as the first example of sustained Indian-style drone in rock and "the first pop song to evoke an Indian feel". The single was influential on the Kinks' contemporaries in the UK pop scene at a time when other musicians embraced Indian sounds. It anticipated the widespread popularity of raga rock, a style pursued by bands such as the Beatles, the Byrds and the Rolling Stones.

London artist, writer and musician Barry Fantoni, a longstanding friend of Davies, recalled playing the track to the Beatles and cited this as the inspiration for them to incorporate drone in "Norwegian Wood (This Bird Has Flown)", which also included a sitar part. In his book Revolution in the Head, Ian MacDonald comments that while the song most likely did influence the Beatles, George Harrison's interest in Indian music had already begun by the summer of 1965, and the Kinks could equally have been influenced by the Beatles' "Ticket to Ride" when recording "See My Friends". Recorded in February that year and released as a single in April, "Ticket to Ride" used a subtle, drug-inspired drone suggestive of India, played on rhythm guitar, and a melody that MacDonald terms "raga-like".

Pete Townshend of the Who considered "See My Friends"' use of drone to be more effective than anything similar in the Beatles' work. Townshend admitted to copying it when the Who recorded the My Generation track "The Good's Gone" later in 1965. Paul McCartney and Mick Jagger were also vocal in their appreciation of the Kinks' song. Dave Davies recalled meeting McCartney in London's Scotch of St. James nightclub and McCartney saying: "You bastards! How dare you! I should have made that record."

In 1976, NME ranked "See My Friends" at number 90 in their list of the 100 best singles of all time. In 1992, The Wire included the song in their list of the "100 Most Important Records Ever Made"; the staff wrote that the "minor Kinks hit" was "the earliest of raga-pop drones, definitive in prophetic unlikeliness", adding that while bigger acts from the period are taken for granted, this song helps reveal that "the undercurrents are where the future is."

"See My Friends" was included on Ray Davies's The Kinks Choral Collection, a 2009 album of choral renditions of the Kinks' hits by the Crouch End Festival Chorus. Performed by Davies and Spoon, the song was also the title track to another collection of re-recordings by Davies, See My Friends, released in 2010.

== Charts ==
Weekly chart performance for "See My Friends"
Chart (1965)	Peak position
Netherlands (Veronica Top 40)	26
Sweden (Kvällstoppen)	19
UK (Melody Maker)	11
UK (New Musical Express)	15
UK (Record Retailer)	10
US Billboard Bubbling Under Hot 100	111
US Cash Box Looking Ahead	102
US Record World Singles Coming Up	116
West Germany (Musikmarkt)	36

== Personnel ==
According to Doug Hinman:

- Ray Davies – lead vocal, acoustic twelve-string guitar
- Dave Davies – backing vocal, electric guitar
- Pete Quaife – bass guitar
- Mick Avory – drums

== Sources ==
- Bellman, Jonathan (1998). The Exotic in Western Music. Lebanon, NH: UPNE. ISBN 1-55553-319-1.
- Davies, Dave (1997). Kink: An Autobiography. London: Pan Books. ISBN 978-0-330-35377-9.
- Hinman, Doug (2004). The Kinks: All Day and All of the Night: Day by Day Concerts, Recordings, and Broadcasts, 1961–1996. San Francisco, CA: Backbeat Books. ISBN 978-0-87930-765-3.
- Jackson, Andrew Grant (2015). 1965: The Most Revolutionary Year in Music. New York, NY: Thomas Dunne Books. ISBN 978-1-250-05962-8.
- Jovanovic, Rob (2013). God Save the Kinks: A Biography. London: Aurum Press. ISBN 978-1-78131-164-6.
- Kitts, Thomas M., ed. (2002). "Chronology". Living on a Thin Line: Crossing Aesthetic Borders with The Kinks. Rumford, RI: Desolation Angel Books. pp. 9–24. ISBN 0-9641005-4-1.
- Kitts, Thomas (2008). Ray Davies: Not Like Everybody Else. Routledge. ISBN 978-1-135-86795-9.
- Lavezzoli, Peter (2006). The Dawn of Indian Music in the West. New York, NY: Continuum. ISBN 0-8264-2819-3.
- MacDonald, Ian (1998). Revolution in the Head: The Beatles' Records and the Sixties. London: Pimlico. ISBN 978-0-7126-6697-8.
- Miller, Andy (2003). The Kinks Are the Village Green Preservation Society. 33⅓. New York, NY: Continuum. ISBN 978-0-8264-1498-4.
- Rogan, Johnny (2015). Ray Davies: A Complicated Life. London: The Bodley Head. ISBN 978-1-84792-331-8.
- Thompson, Gordon (2008). Please Please Me: Sixties British Pop, Inside Out. Oxford University Press. ISBN 978-0-19-971555-8.
