= The Kink Kontroversy =

1965 studio album by the Kinks

Studio album by the Kinks
- Released: 26 November 1965
- Recorded: August 1965 ("Ring the Bells"); 25–26 October and 3–4 November 1965
- Studios: Pye, London
- Genres: Beat; rock and roll; pop
- Length: 30:12
- Labels: Pye (UK); Reprise (US)
- Producer: Shel Talmy

The Kinks chronology
Kinda Kinks (1965)	The Kink Kontroversy (1965)	Well Respected Kinks (1966)

The Kinks US chronology
Kinkdom (1965)	The Kink Kontroversy (1966)	The Kinks Greatest Hits! (1966)

Singles from The Kink Kontroversy
- 1. "Till the End of the Day" / "Where Have All the Good Times Gone" Released: 19 November 1965

The Kink Kontroversy is the third studio album by the English rock band the Kinks. It was released in the United Kingdom on 26 November 1965 by Pye Records. Issued in the United States on 30 March 1966 by Reprise Records, it was the Kinks' first American album to feature an identical track listing to its British counterpart. It is a transitional album, with elements of both the earlier Kinks' styles (heavily blues-influenced songs such as "Milk Cow Blues" and variations on the band's power chord-driven hits from 1964 to 1965 such as "Till the End of the Day") and early indications of the future direction of Ray Davies' songwriting styles ("The World Keeps Going Round" and "I'm on an Island"). The liner notes were written by Michael Aldred.

== Background ==
The album's title is a mocking reference to the notorious reputation the group had developed over the previous year, including onstage fights and concert riots in Europe, which led to a ban on the group's concerts in the USA.

"Where Have All the Good Times Gone" makes several references and/or allusions to Beatles and Rolling Stones songs.

== Release ==
The single "Till the End of the Day" was a major hit, reaching No. 8 in the UK and No. 50 in the US, spending eight weeks or more in each chart.

American singer Bobby Rydell covered "When I See That Girl of Mine", which was released as a single in the US a full month before the Kinks' version was made public.

== Reception ==
Professional ratings
Review scores
Source	Rating
AllMusic	4.5/5 stars
The Encyclopedia of Popular Music	4/5 stars

AllMusic praised the album as the Kinks' coming-of-age, commenting that their raw early material was being replaced by more thoughtful and sophisticated songs. They pointed out "I'm on an Island", "Where Have All the Good Times Gone", "Ring the Bells", "The World Keeps Going Round", and "I Am Free" as particularly strong examples of this.

== Legacy ==
American indie rock band Sleater-Kinney used the same album cover layout as an homage for their 1997 album Dig Me Out.

== Track listing ==
All tracks are written by Ray Davies except where noted.

Side one

1. "Milk Cow Blues" (Sleepy John Estes) – 3:44
2. "Ring the Bells" – 2:21
3. "Gotta Get the First Plane Home" – 1:49
4. "When I See that Girl of Mine" – 2:12
5. "I Am Free" (Dave Davies) – 2:32
6. "Till the End of the Day" – 2:21

Side two

1. "The World Keeps Going Round" – 2:36
2. "I'm on an Island" – 2:19
3. "Where Have All the Good Times Gone" – 2:53
4. "It's Too Late" – 2:37
5. "What's in Store for Me" – 2:06
6. "You Can't Win" – 2:42

== Personnel ==
According to band researcher Doug Hinman:

The Kinks

- Ray Davies – lead vocals, electric and acoustic guitars; harmonica ("Gotta Get the First Plane Home"); piano ("Ring the Bells"); producer ("It's Too Late", uncredited)
- Dave Davies – backing vocals, electric guitar; acoustic guitar ("Ring the Bells"); lead vocals ("I am Free" and "What's in Store for Me"); co-lead vocals ("Milk Cow Blues", "Where Have All the Good Times Gone" and "You Can't Win")
- Pete Quaife – bass guitar; backing vocals ("I am Free" and "Till the End of the Day")
- Mick Avory – drums ("Milk Cow Blues", "Ring the Bells"; possibly "The World Keeps Going Round" and "It's too Late"); tambourine ("Till the End of the Day"); maracas ("Gotta Get the First Plane Home"); bell ("I'm on an Island")

Additional musicians and production

- Clem Cattini – drums (all tracks except "Milk Cow Blues" and "Ring the Bells"; possibly "The World Keeps Going Round" and "It's too Late")
- Rasa Davies – backing vocals ("Till the End of the Day")
- Nicky Hopkins – piano (all tracks except "Ring the Bells")
- Alan MacKenzie – engineer
- Alan O'Duffy (credited as "Irish") – assistant engineer
- Shel Talmy – producer; electric guitar ("It's too Late")

== Charts ==
Weekly chart performance
Chart (1965–66)	Peak position
UK Melody Maker Top Ten LPs	7
UK New Musical Express Best Selling LPs	10
UK Record Retailer LPs Chart	9
US Billboard Top LPs	95
US Cash Box Top 100 Albums	72
US Record World 100 Top LPs	52
West German Musikmarkt LP Hit Parade	8
