= You Still Want Me =

- UK A-side label

Single by the Kinks
- B-side: "You Do Something to Me"
- Released: 17 April 1964
- Recorded: 20 January 1964
- Studio: Pye, London
- Genre: Merseybeat
- Label: Pye
- Songwriter(s): Ray Davies
- Producer(s): Shel Talmy

The Kinks UK singles chronology
"Long Tall Sally" (1964)	"You Still Want Me" (1964)	"You Really Got Me" (1964)

"You Still Want Me" is a single by the Kinks released in 1964. It was their second record, and (like its predecessor) failed to chart upon release, threatening the band's deal with Pye Records. However, the massive success of the band's next single, "You Really Got Me", ensured their tenure with Pye would continue until 1971, when they shifted to RCA.

== "You Do Something to Me" ==
The B-side "You Do Something to Me" was one of the first five songs the Kinks ever recorded, before sessions for their first album had begun in earnest. The song has been described as "proto-punk". It was later released on an album with the 1998 reissue of Kinks.

== Personnel ==
According to band researcher Doug Hinman:

The Kinks

- Ray Davies – lead vocal, rhythm guitar
- Dave Davies – backing vocal, lead guitar
- Pete Quaife – backing vocal, bass

Additional musician

- Bobby Graham – drums
