= Till the End of the Day =

- West German picture sleeve

Single by the Kinks

from the album The Kink Kontroversy
- B-side: "Where Have All the Good Times Gone"
- Released: 19 November 1965
- Recorded: 3–4 November 1965
- Studio: Pye, London
- Genre: Hard rock; garage rock; pop; power pop
- Length: 2:20
- Label: Pye (UK); Reprise (US)
- Songwriter: Ray Davies
- Producer: Shel Talmy

The Kinks UK singles chronology
"See My Friends" (1965)	"Till the End of the Day" (1965)	"Dedicated Follower of Fashion" (1966)

The Kinks US singles chronology
"A Well Respected Man" (1965)	"Till the End of the Day" (1966)	"Dedicated Follower of Fashion" (1966)

"Till the End of the Day" is a song by the Kinks, written by Ray Davies and released as a single in 1965 and later on their album The Kink Kontroversy. It centres on power chords, like many of the group's early hits, and was similarly successful, reaching number eight in the United Kingdom and number 50 in the United States, spending eight weeks or more in each chart.

== Background ==
Davies recalled of the process of writing the song,

I remember how 'Till the End of the Day' came about. I had a bit of writer’s block, and my managers were getting worried because I hadn't produced anything in almost a month. [Laughs] They sent Mort Shuman 'round to my house, one of my hit-writing heroes. He wrote "Save the Last Dance For Me" with Doc Pomus. This mad, druggy New Yorker came 'round to my little semi-detached house in London. He said, 'I'm here to find out what you're thinking about. I'm not interested in what you have written; I'm interested in what you're gonna write.' He was completely pee'd off by my managers to say it. I thought it was ridiculous that there was so much importance put on it. If I don't want to write for a month, I won't. To say the least, I was pressured into doing it. Then I went off to stay with my sister and bought a new toy, a little upright piano, and wrote 'Till The End Of The Day.'

Of the song's meaning, Davies said, "That song was about freedom, in the sense that someone's been a slave or locked up in prison. It's a song about escaping something. I didn't know it was about my state of mind."

Billboard described the song as a "rockin' dance beat wailer with up-beat lyric". Cash Box described the single as a "rollicking, fast-moving, bluesy romancer about a fella who is especially hung-up on his gal".

== Cover versions ==
A cover version by Big Star appeared on the CD release of Third/Sister Lovers. Alex Chilton, the singer for Big Star, would eventually record the song with Davies 30 years later for Davies' album See My Friends.

The song was covered by Japanese band Shonen Knife and is one of four songs on the CD single "Brown Mushrooms And Other Delights" from their Rock Animals album released in 1993.

Ty Segall's band Fuzz covered the song on their 2013 debut album.

Former KISS guitarist Ace Frehley recorded a cover of the song on his solo covers album Origins Vol. 1 released in April 2016.

== Personnel ==
According to band researcher Doug Hinman:

The Kinks

- Ray Davies – lead vocal, electric guitar
- Dave Davies – backing vocal, electric guitar
- Pete Quaife – backing vocal, bass
- Mick Avory – tambourine

Additional musicians

- Clem Cattini – drums
- Rasa Davies – backing vocal
- Nicky Hopkins – piano

== Charts ==
Chart (1965–66)	Peak position
Australia (Kent Music Report)	63
Canada Top Singles (RPM)	34
Finland (Suomen virallinen lista)	37
France (IFOP)	35
Germany (GfK)	19
Netherlands (Dutch Top 40)	4
Netherlands (Single Top 100)	6
Norway (VG-lista)	7
Sweden (Kvällstoppen)	3
Sweden (Tio i Topp)	1
UK Singles (Official Charts)	8
US Billboard Hot 100	50
US Cash Box Top 100	43
