= Ev'rybody's Gonna Be Happy =

- Dutch picture sleeve

Single by the Kinks

from the album Kinda Kinks (US edition)
- A-side: "Who'll Be the Next in Line" (US)
- B-side: "Who'll Be the Next in Line" (UK)
- Released: 19 March 1965
- Recorded: 22–23 December 1964
- Studio: Pye, London
- Genre: Rock; beat; rhythm and blues
- Label: Pye (UK); Reprise (US)
- Songwriter: Ray Davies
- Producer: Shel Talmy

The Kinks UK singles chronology
"Tired of Waiting for You" (1965)	"Ev'rybody's Gonna Be Happy" (1965)	"Set Me Free" (1965)

The Kinks US singles chronology
"Set Me Free" (1965)	"Who'll Be the Next in Line" / "Ev'rybody's Gonna Be Happy" (1965)	"See My Friends" (1965)

"Ev'rybody's Gonna Be Happy" is a song by Ray Davies, released as a UK single by the Kinks in 1965. As the follow-up to the number-one hit "Tired of Waiting for You", and having their previous three singles all chart among the top two, it was less successful, reaching number 17. It broke a run of what would have been twelve consecutive top-ten singles in the UK during the period 1964–1968.

The song was written as a musical experiment, rather than as an intended single, according to Davies in an interview, where he also claimed that the demo became the master version of it.

== Background ==
Both sides of the single were recorded in December 1964 in the same session as the B-side and final overdubs for "Tired of Waiting for You". "Ev'rybody's Gonna Be Happy" drew inspiration from the Earl Van Dyke trio, whom the Kinks had previously toured with. Upon hearing the playback, the Kinks producer Shel Talmy was sceptical of the single's release, as he did not like the sound, in contrast to Davies who was convinced that it would become a hit.

Following the disappointing performance in the UK, Reprise held off releasing the single in the US. They did release follow-up "Set Me Free" but when the next UK single, "See My Friends", was judged to be even less suitable, they flipped the "Ev'rybody..." single with "Who'll Be the Next in Line" as the A-side, releasing it four months after the UK version. Although only a moderate hit, reaching number 34, it was more successful than "See My Friends" which, when it was eventually released in the US in September, failed to reach the Billboard Hot 100 (peaking at No. 111).

As well as being the US B-side, "Ev'rybody's Gonna Be Happy" was included as the first track on side 2 of the US version of the Kinda Kinks album.

Cash Box described it as a "catchy, high-spirited, rhythmic multi-beat teen-oriented terpsichorean item".

== Personnel ==
According to band researcher Doug Hinman:

The Kinks

- Ray Davies – lead vocal, piano
- Dave Davies – backing vocal, electric guitar
- Pete Quaife – backing vocal, bass
- Mick Avory – drums

Additional musicians

- Rasa Davies – backing vocal
- Unidentified girlfriends of band members – backing vocals

== Charts ==
Chart (1965)	Peak position
France (IFOP)	31
Germany (GfK)	29
Netherlands (Dutch Top 40)	28
Sweden (Tio i Topp)	12
UK Singles (OCC)	17
