= Dedicated Follower of Fashion =

- West German picture sleeve

Single by the Kinks
- B-side: "Sittin' on My Sofa"
- Released: 25 February 1966
- Recorded: 7 and 10 February 1966
- Studio: Pye, London
- Genre: Rock; pop; folk rock; music hall
- Length: 3:05
- Label: Pye (UK); Reprise (US)
- Songwriter: Ray Davies
- Producer: Shel Talmy

The Kinks singles chronology
"Till the End of the Day" (1965)	"Dedicated Follower of Fashion" (1966)	"Sunny Afternoon" (1966)

"Dedicated Follower of Fashion" is a 1966 song by British band the Kinks. It lampoons the contemporary British fashion scene and mod culture in general. Originally released as a single, it has been included on many of the band's later albums.

Musically, it and "A Well Respected Man" marked the beginning of an expansion in the Kinks' inspirations, drawing as much from British music hall traditions as from American rhythm and blues, the latter of which served as the inspiration for breakthrough Kinks songs like "You Really Got Me". While it was quite scornful toward them, many of the fashionistas the song mocks would later take its title to heart.

== Background ==
In the mid-1960s fashion in Britain was becoming increasingly daring and outrageous, driven by the youth-oriented culture of Swinging London. Boutiques such as Biba, designers like Mary Quant, and the television personalities like Cathy McGowan who popularised them became celebrated as much as the entertainers who wore their mod clothes.

Fashion trends changed rapidly, and the Carnaby Street shops did a brisk business among those trying to keep in step with the latest craze. Ray Davies saw all this and satirised the hypothetical extreme, a superficial dandy whose "clothes are loud but never square / It will make or break him so he's got to buy the best ... He thinks he is a flower to be looked at ... In matters of the cloth he is as fickle as can be."

== Inspiration ==
Ray Davies claimed that the song was inspired by a fight he had with a fashion designer at a party:

I got pissed off with [a fashion designer at a party] always going on about fashion. I was just saying you don't have to be anything; you decide what you want to be and you just walk down the street and if you're good the world will change as you walk past. I just wanted it to be the individual who created his own fashion. ... [It was] a terrible brawl. I kicked him, and I kicked his girlfriend up the arse.

Davies claims he wrote the song in one sitting, typing the lyrics out on a typewriter, with no later revision. It was performed with Davies mostly accompanying himself on acoustic guitar, with the rest of the band joining in on the "It will make or break him so he's got to buy the best 'cause..." and Dave Davies echoing the "Oh yes he is" lines in the refrain. The song contains an allusion ("they seek him here, they seek him there") to the hero and protagonist of the 1905 English adventure novel The Scarlet Pimpernel.

The band attempted recording the song a number of times, playing with the arrangement, lyric diction, and guitar sounds. Ray Davies was never totally satisfied with the released version, and was angered that the song's production and release were rushed by the band's managers and Pye Records. Specifically, he attempted the opening multiple times. Pete Quaife said of these attempts:

That guitar clanging at the beginning, we did it over and over, changed guitars, tried it with a piano. Ray was after a sound and he didn't get it. When he realised he wasn't getting it, he took the tape, rolled it across the floor and set fire to it. The next day we started again and he settled for that. But I know he wasn't happy with the final result.

At least two of the alternative versions are available as bonus CD tracks and as bootleg recordings.

== Reception ==
The song reached number four in the UK on the Record Retailer chart. It became their first top five single since "Tired of Waiting for You", which reached number one in early 1965. It reached the top of the charts in The Netherlands and New Zealand. In the US, however, it barely managed to crack the Top Forty, peaking at No. 36. The lyrics won Davies an Ivor Novello Award for songwriting in 1966.

Despite the praise for the song, Kinks guitarist Dave Davies described the song as "terrible", saying, "[it was] the one Kink record I haven't got."

Billboard said the song had a "clever, music-hall melody and lyric in the bag of [the Kinks] smash 'A Well Respected Man.'"

== Legacy ==
With the release of ["Dedicated Follower of Fashion"] in the spring of 1966, the Kinks changed style to songs full of wry observation on contemporary life, a style that can be traced back through singers like Tommy Steele and ultimately to music hall. ... With the exception of some songs by the Beatles and, a decade later, Jam and Madness, this observational viewpoint has remained almost entirely untapped.

— Musicologist Allan F. Moore, 1997

Despite its commercial success, the song actually began to trigger some of the identity crises that would later plague Davies' personal life. He wrote later:

With 'A Dedicated Follower of Fashion' such a hit, people started coming up to me on the street and singing the chorus in my face: 'Oh yes he is, oh yes he is,' as if to say that I knew who I was. Unfortunately, my inner and somewhat distorted sense of reality told me that this was not who I wanted to be: I didn't know who I was.

In subsequent years many of those the song derided would later take its title to heart. Holly Brubach, then working as a fashion writer for The New Yorker and The New York Times, borrowed the song's title for a book collection of her essays. Outside of fashion, the song's title has remained a metaphor for slavish conformity, but in a more positive sense as an analogy for the growth of online social networks.

In 1993, the song was included in the soundtrack of the Jim Sheridan film In the Name of the Father.

== Personnel ==
According to band researcher Doug Hinman, except where noted:

The Kinks

- Ray Davies – lead vocal, acoustic twelve-string guitar
- Dave Davies – backing vocal, electric guitar
- Pete Quaife – bass
- Mick Avory – drums

Additional musician

- Nicky Hopkins – piano

== Charts ==
Chart (1966)	Peak position
Australia (Kent Music Report)	36
Belgium (Ultratop 50 Flanders)	12
Belgium (Ultratop 50 Wallonia)	45
Canada Top Singles (RPM)	11
Canada (CHUM)	10
Denmark	2
Finland (Suomen virallinen lista)	37
France (IFOP)	68
Germany (GfK)	11
Ireland (IRMA)	3
Netherlands (Dutch Top 40)	1
Netherlands (Single Top 100)	1
New Zealand (Listener)	1
Norway (VG-lista)	7
Singapore	4
Sweden (Kvällstoppen)	6
Sweden (Tio i Topp)	5
UK Singles (Official Charts)	4
US Billboard Hot 100	36
US Cash Box Top 100	59
