= Musikmarkt =

Defunct magazine

Musikmarkt was a magazine of the music industry in Germany, Austria and Switzerland, based in Munich. Die Welt, a German newspaper, described the magazine as the music industry's thermometer.

== History and profile ==
Musikmarkt was established by publisher Josef Keller Verlag in 1959. Uwe Lencher served as the editor-in-chief of the magazine for 23 years from 1973 to his death in April 1996. The magazine had its headquarters in Munich. The magazine was started as a bi-monthly publication. Then it was published weekly until 2014 when its frequency was switched to monthly.

Musikmarkt determined the official German charts from its start in 1959 to the 1970s, when Media Control assumed the responsibility. The magazine also contained the weekly Top-100 charts for singles and albums when it was published on a weekly basis. The magazine and its website were both closed down in July 2016. Stefan Zarges was the last editor of the magazine.

== Circulation ==
Under the editorship of Uwe Lencher the circulation of Musikmarkt was nearly 12,000 copies, making it a significant publication for German entertainment industry. It was 4,370 copies when it was shut down in 2016.
