= Set Me Free (The Kinks song) =

- Dutch picture sleeve

Single by the Kinks

from the album Kinda Kinks (US edition)
- B-side: "I Need You"
- Released: 21 May 1965
- Recorded: 13–14 April 1965
- Studio: Pye, London
- Genre: Pop; R&B
- Length: 2:12
- Label: Pye (UK); Reprise (US)
- Songwriter: Ray Davies
- Producer: Shel Talmy

The Kinks UK singles chronology
"Ev'rybody's Gonna Be Happy" (1965)	"Set Me Free" (1965)	"See My Friends" (1965)

The Kinks US singles chronology
"Tired of Waiting for You" (1965)	"Set Me Free" (1965)	"Who'll Be the Next in Line" (1965)

"Set Me Free" is a song by Ray Davies, released first by the Kinks in 1965. Along with "Tired of Waiting for You", it is one of band's first attempts at a softer, more introspective sound. The song's B-side, "I Need You", makes prominent use of powerchords in the style of the Kinks' early "raunchy" sound. "Set Me Free" was heard in the Ken Loach-directed Up the Junction, a BBC Wednesday Play which aired in November 1965; this marked the first appearance of a Kinks song on a film or TV soundtrack.

Billboard said of the single that "hot on the heels of [the Kinks'] 'Tired of Waiting for You' smash comes this down home blues rhythm material with a good teen lyric." Cash Box described it as "a snappy tune that’s taken for an engaging disk ride."

== Personnel ==
According to band researcher Doug Hinman:

The Kinks

- Ray Davies – lead vocal, rhythm guitar
- Dave Davies – backing vocal, lead guitar
- Pete Quaife – bass
- Mick Avory – drums

Additional musician

- Rasa Davies – backing vocal

== Charts ==
Chart (1965)	Peak position
Australia (Kent Music Report)	54
Canada Top Singles (RPM)	2
France (IFOP)	29
Germany (GfK)	32
Netherlands (Dutch Top 40)	12
Sweden (Tio i Topp)	11
UK Singles (Official Charts)	9
US Billboard Hot 100	23
US Cash Box Top 100	24
