= Kinda Kinks =

Studio album by the Kinks
- Released: 5 March 1965
- Recorded: 24 August, 22 December 1964 – 17 February 1965
- Studio: Pye and IBC, London
- Genre: Rock and roll; R&B; pop; rock
- Length: 27:37
- Label: Pye
- Producer: Shel Talmy

The Kinks chronology
Kinks (1964)	Kinda Kinks (1965)	The Kink Kontroversy (1965)

The Kinks US chronology
Kinks-Size (1965)	Kinda Kinks (1965)	Kinkdom (1965)

Alternative cover
- US release by Reprise Records

Singles from Kinda Kinks
- 1. "Tired of Waiting for You" / "Come on Now" Released: 15 January 1965

Kinda Kinks is the second studio album by the English rock band the Kinks. It was released on 5 March 1965 in the United Kingdom by Pye Records. The original United States release, issued by Reprise Records on 11 August 1965, omits three tracks and substitutes the singles "Set Me Free" and "Everybody's Gonna Be Happy". Recorded and released within two weeks after returning from a tour in Asia, Ray Davies and the band were not satisfied with the production.

== Production ==
The album was recorded immediately after the return of the group from an Asian tour, and was completed and released within two weeks. Consequently, the production was rushed and, according to Ray Davies, the band was not completely satisfied with the final cuts. Due to record company pressure, however, no time was available to fix certain flaws present in the mix. Ray Davies has expressed his dissatisfaction towards the production not being up to par. Commenting on this, he said: "A bit more care should have been taken with it. I think (producer) Shel Talmy went too far in trying to keep in the rough edges. Some of the double tracking on that is appalling. It had better songs on it than the first album, but it wasn't executed in the right way. It was just far too rushed."

== Releases ==
Professional ratings
Review scores
Source	Rating
Record Mirror	3/5 stars

It was released by Pye in the UK on 5 March 1965, and by Reprise in the USA on 11 August 1965. The US release had a rearranged track listing and repackaged cover. Several tracks were removed, and the single "Set Me Free", released two months after the UK issue of Kinda Kinks, was unique to the album's US release. In the UK, the album was only released in mono; no stereo mix was made.

The single "Tired of Waiting for You" was a number one hit on the UK singles chart. The album itself hit number three on the UK Albums Chart.

"Wonder Where My Baby Is Tonight" was released as a single in Norway and Sweden in 1966, backed with "I Need You", reaching number seven on the Swedish charts.

== Legacy ==
Bruce Eder, in a retrospective summary for AllMusic, wrote that the album was uneven, but that "...what was first-rate was also highly memorable, and what wasn't also wasn't bad." He also made note of some maturing in Ray Davies's songwriting.

== Track listing ==
=== In all markets except the US ===
All tracks are written by Ray Davies except where noted.

Side one

1. "Look for Me Baby" – 2:17
2. "Got My Feet on the Ground" (R. Davies, Dave Davies) – 2:14
3. "Nothin' in the World Can Stop Me Worryin' 'Bout that Girl" – 2:44
4. "Naggin' Woman" (Jimmy Anderson, Jerry West) – 2:36
5. "Wonder Where My Baby Is Tonight" – 2:01
6. "Tired of Waiting for You" – 2:31

Side two

1. "Dancing in the Street" (William "Mickey" Stevenson, Marvin Gaye) – 2:20
2. "Don't Ever Change" – 2:25
3. "Come on Now" – 1:49
4. "So Long" – 2:10
5. "You Shouldn't Be Sad" – 2:03
6. "Something Better Beginning" – 2:26

=== Original US release ===
All tracks are written by Ray Davies except where noted.

Side one

1. "Look for Me Baby" – 2:17
2. "Got My Feet on the Ground" – 2:14
3. "Nothin' in the World Can Stop Me Worryin' 'Bout That Girl" – 2:44
4. "Wonder Where My Baby Is Tonight" – 2:01
5. "Set Me Free" – 2:12

Side two

1. "Ev'rybody's Gonna Be Happy" – 2:16
2. "Dancing in the Street" (Stevenson, Gaye) – 2:20
3. "Don't Ever Change" – 2:25
4. "So Long" – 2:10
5. "You Shouldn't Be Sad" – 2:03
6. "Something Better Beginning" – 2:26

== Personnel ==
According to band researcher Doug Hinman:

The Kinks

- Ray Davies – lead vocals, electric rhythm guitar; acoustic guitar ("Nothin' in the World", "Don't Ever Change" and "So Long"); piano
- Dave Davies – lead guitar, backing vocals; lead vocals ("Got My Feet on the Ground", "Naggin' Woman,'" "Wonder Where My Baby is Tonight", and "Come on Now")
- Pete Quaife – bass guitar, backing vocals
- Mick Avory – drums

Additional musicians

- Rasa Davies – backing vocals
- Bobby Graham – drums ("Tired of Waiting for You")
- Unidentified girlfriends of the Kinks – backing vocals ("Ev'rybody's Gonna Be Happy")

Production

- Bob Auger – engineer
- Glyn Johns – engineer ("Got My Feet on the Ground")
- Shel Talmy – producer

== Charts ==
Weekly chart performance
Chart (1965)	Peak position
UK Melody Maker Top Ten LPs	3
UK New Musical Express Best Selling LPs	2
UK Record Retailer LPs Chart	3
US Billboard Top LPs	60
US Cash Box Top 100 Albums	54
US Record World 100 Top LPs	37
West German Musikmarkt LP Hit Parade	12
