= All Day and All of the Night =

- West German picture sleeve

Single by the Kinks
- B-side: "I Gotta Move"
- Released: 23 October 1964
- Recorded: 24 September 1964
- Studio: Pye, London
- Genre: Garage rock; hard rock; proto-punk; power pop
- Length: 2:22
- Label: Pye (UK); Reprise (US)
- Songwriter: Ray Davies
- Producer: Shel Talmy

The Kinks singles chronology
"You Really Got Me" (1964)	"All Day and All of the Night" (1964)	"Tired of Waiting for You" (1965)

"All Day and All of the Night" is a song by the English rock band the Kinks from 1964. Released as a single, it reached No. 2 in the UK on the Record Retailer chart and No. 7 on the US Billboard Hot 100 chart in 1965. The song was included on the Kinksize Hits EP in the UK and the Kinks' second American album, Kinks-Size (1965).

== Background ==
Like their previous hit "You Really Got Me", the song is based on a power chord riff. Both songs are similar in beat and structure, with similar background vocals, progressions, and guitar solos.

Dave Davies claimed that the song was where he "found his voice":

I liked the guitar sound on "All Day And All of the Night", the second single we had. When they tried to develop amplifiers that had pre-gain and all, I thought it wasn't quite right, and I struggled with the sound for a while. I never liked Marshalls, because they sounded like everybody else. Then in the mid '70s I started using Peavey, and people said, "Nobody uses Peavey – country and western bands use them" [laughs]. I used to blow them up every night. I used two Peavey Maces together, and it was brilliant.

Billboard described the song as a "potent entry", stating that the "raw, gutsy delivery is maintained along with raunchy guitar sound". Cash Box described it as a "raunchy-rock'er that should flip the teeners", similar to "You Really Got Me".

== "Hello, I Love You" controversies ==
Similarities between the song and the Doors' 1968 song "Hello, I Love You" have been pointed out. Ray Davies said on the topic: "My publisher wanted to sue. I was unwilling to do that. I think they cut a deal somewhere, but I don't know the details." Dave Davies added: "That one is the most irritating of all of them ... I did a show where I played 'All Day and All of the Night' and stuck in a piece of 'Hello, I Love You'. There was some response, there were a few smiles. But I've never understood why nobody's ever said anything about it. You can't say anything about the Doors. You're not allowed to."

In the liner notes to the Doors Box set, Robby Krieger has denied the allegations that the song's musical structure was stolen from Ray Davies. Instead, he said the song's vibe was taken from Cream's song "Sunshine of Your Love". According to the Doors biography No One Here Gets Out Alive, courts in the UK determined in favour of Davies and any royalties for the song are paid to him. It is unlikely that Davies was behind the lawsuit, given what little return awaited him under his publishing arrangement.

== Release ==
In France "All Day and All of the Night" was released as part of the 4-track EP with "I'm a Lover Not a Fighter", "I Gotta Move" and "Long Tall Shorty" in 1964. This EP was reissued in 2017 as part of Record Store Day 2017.

== Personnel ==
According to Doug Hinman and Andrew Sandoval:

The Kinks

- Ray Davies – lead vocals
- Dave Davies – backing vocals, lead and rhythm guitar
- Pete Quaife – backing vocals, bass guitar
- Mick Avory – tambourine

Additional musicians

- Rasa Didzpetris – backing vocals
- Perry Ford – piano
- Bobby Graham – drums
- Johnny B. Great – backing vocals
- Ray Davies – rhythm guitar - according to Dave Davies

Note

- Hinman and Sandoval offer the possibility of a third rhythm guitar contribution, but add that it is not possible to identify who may have played it given the lack of surviving session tapes or studio logs.

== Charts ==
Chart (1964–1965)	Peak position
Australia (Kent Music Report)	14
Belgium (Ultratop 50 Wallonia)	40
Canada Top Singles (RPM)	12
France (SNEP)	12
Netherlands (Dutch Top 40)	17
Netherlands (Single Top 100)	9
New Zealand (Lever Hit Parade)	5
Sweden (Kvällstoppen)	18
Sweden (Tio i Topp)	10
UK Singles (Official Charts)	2
US Billboard Hot 100	7
US Cash Box Top 100	5
US Record World 100 Top Pops	8
West Germany (GfK)	22

== Certifications ==
Region	Certification	Certified units/sales
New Zealand (RMNZ)	Gold	15,000^{‡}
United Kingdom (BPI)	Gold	400,000^{‡}
^{‡} Sales+streaming figures based on certification alone.

== Cover versions ==
- English heavy metal band Praying Mantis recorded a cover for their 1981 debut album, Time Tells No Lies. It was released as the album's second and final single, reaching No. 106 on the UK Record Business Singles chart in April 1981.
- The Stranglers recorded a cover in 1987, reaching No. 7 in the UK Singles Chart.
