= Tired of Waiting for You =

- West German picture sleeve

Single by the Kinks

from the album Kinda Kinks
- B-side: "Come on Now"
- Released: 15 January 1965
- Recorded: 24 August and 29 December 1964
- Studio: Pye and IBC, London
- Genre: Pop
- Length: 2:31
- Label: Pye (UK); Reprise (US)
- Songwriter: Ray Davies
- Producer: Shel Talmy

The Kinks UK singles chronology
"All Day and All of the Night" (1964)	"Tired of Waiting for You" (1965)	"Ev'rybody's Gonna Be Happy" (1965)

The Kinks US singles chronology
"All Day and All of the Night" (1964)	"Tired of Waiting for You" (1965)	"Set Me Free" (1965)

"Tired of Waiting for You" is a song by the English rock band the Kinks. It was released as a single on 15 January 1965 in the UK and on 17 February 1965 in the US. The single reached number one in the UK and number six in the US. It then appeared on their second studio album, Kinda Kinks. It was the group's highest-charting single in the US – tied with "Come Dancing", which achieved the same chart position eighteen years later in 1983.

== Background ==
According to Ray Davies, the music for "Tired of Waiting for You" was written on the train to the recording studio and the words were written at a coffee shop during a break in the session. The track was a leftover from the sessions of the band's debut album, Kinks.

During the recording sessions for the song, the band felt that the guitar sound evident on their previous two singles ("You Really Got Me" and "All Day and All of the Night") was missing. Dave Davies said:

The recording went well but there was something missing and it was my raunchy guitar sound. Ray and I were worried that putting that heavy-sounding guitar on top of a ponderous song might ruin it. Luckily it enhanced the recording, giving it a more cutting, emotional edge. In my opinion "Tired Of Waiting" was the perfect pop record.

Davies also said of the song, "It was a change of style for us, we got a bit posher! Our material started to get a bit more melodic after that."

The song was recorded late August 1964 at Pye Studios (No. 2), London, with additional guitar overdub at IBC Studios, London on 29 December 1964. "Come On Now" was recorded 22 or 23 December 1964 at Pye Studios (No. 2).

== Release ==
"Tired of Waiting for You" was written before "All Day and All of the Night", but "All Day and All of the Night" was released first due to its similarities to the band's first UK hit, "You Really Got Me".

It reached No. 1 on both the UK Singles Chart and Melody Maker, becoming the band's second UK chart-topper since "You Really Got Me". The single also reached No. 6 on the US Billboard Hot 100, the highest charting Kinks single in the US until the band's 1983 hit "Come Dancing" tied it. Billboard described the song as "a hot follow -up to 'All Day and All of the Night.'" Cash Box described it as "a medium-paced, shuffle-beat lament about a guy who gets annoyed waiting for his girl to prepare herself for their dates." Record World said that the Kinks are "going for their third big hit and certain to get it with this nifty slice of rock guitar and song session."

According to Ray Davies, the band received a telegram from London in New York telling them of the success on Melody Maker, but while the rest of the band went partying, the elder Davies brother ordered a bottle of champagne and enjoyed his success.

== Personnel ==
According to band researcher Doug Hinman:

The Kinks

- Ray Davies – lead vocal, electric guitar
- Dave Davies – backing vocal, electric guitar
- Pete Quaife – bass guitar

Additional musician

- Bobby Graham – drums

== Chart performance ==
Chart (1965)	Peak position
Australia (Kent Music Report)	29
Belgium (Ultratop 50 Wallonia)	48
Canada Top Singles (RPM)	3
Canada (CHUM)	21
Finland (Suomen virallinen lista)	36
France (IFOP)	27
Germany (GfK)	13
Ireland (IRMA)	3
South Africa (Springbok Radio)	1
Sweden (Kvällstoppen)	6
Sweden (Tio i Topp)	3
UK Singles (Official Charts)	1
US Billboard Hot 100	6
US Cash Box Top 100	5
US Record World 100 Top Pops	5
