= Mick Avory =

English musician (born 1944)

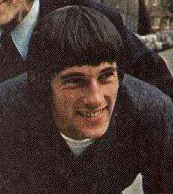
- Avory in 1965

Background information
- Born: Michael Charles Avory; 15 February 1944 (age 82); Chipping Barnet, Hertfordshire, England
- Origin: East Molesey, Surrey, England
- Genres: Rock, pop
- Occupations: Drummer, percussionist
- Instruments: Drums, percussion
- Years active: 1962–present
- Labels: Pye, RCA, Arista

Michael Charles Avory (born 15 February 1944) is an English musician, best known as the longtime drummer and percussionist for the English rock band the Kinks. He joined them shortly after their formation in 1964 and remained with them until 1984, when he left amid creative friction with guitarist Dave Davies. He is the longest-serving member of the band, apart from the Davies brothers. He is also the most prolific member, again apart from the Davies brothers, who has played on twenty studio albums or nearly all of the band's creative output.

== Before the band (1962–1963) ==
Before he joined the Kinks, Avory was a member of the band Bobby Angelo & the Tuxedos, who had a No. 30 hit with "Baby Sittin'" in August 1961. After leaving that group, he was asked twice to rehearse on drums at the Bricklayers Arms pub in London during late May/early June 1962 for a group of musicians who were later to become the Rolling Stones. It has been said that he also went on to play at their first show at The Marquee Club on 12 July 1962, yet Avory himself says "I think Tony Chapman did the gig at the Marquee. I didn't. I just rehearsed twice in the Bricklayers Arms in Soho." Mick Jagger has said he has no recollection of playing any gigs with Avory.

== The Kinks (1964–1984) ==
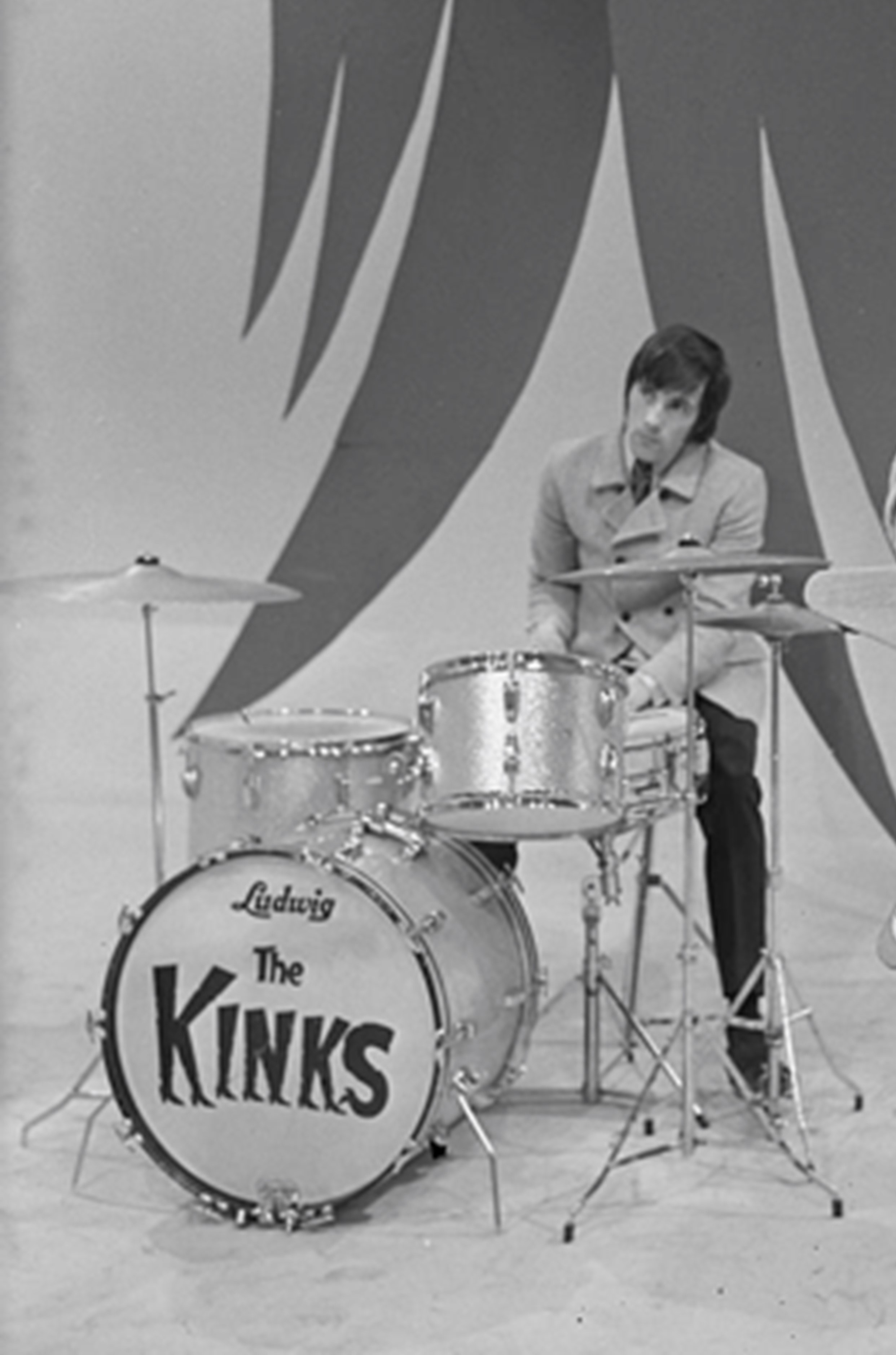
Mick Avory (1967)

Avory joined the Kinks in January 1964, after their previous drummer Micky Willet left the band. Avory was hired to replace him after their management saw an advertisement Avory had placed in the trade magazine Melody Maker. He attended a rehearsal at the Camden Head in Islington shortly before Christmas of 1963, and was then offered the job by manager Robert Wace just after New Year. Despite his ability, early Kinks recordings (including hits such as "You Really Got Me") commonly did not feature Avory on drums; producer Shel Talmy hired more seasoned session drummers (most notably Clem Cattini and Bobby Graham) for studio work well into 1965, but with Avory often providing supporting percussion. He drummed on certain tracks on the first and third albums and all but one song on the second album, Kinda Kinks. The first single A-side Avory played on was "Ev'rybody's Gonna Be Happy", and he went on to play on all Kinks recordings from the 1966 album Face to Face until his departure in 1984.

Avory was always considered the quietest and most easy-going member of the Kinks lineup and was Ray Davies's best friend. However, his turbulent working relationship with guitarist Dave Davies resulted in many legendary onstage fights. In the most notorious incident, at the Capitol Theatre, Cardiff, South Wales, during the Kinks' 1965 UK tour, Avory struck Dave over the head with his hi-hat stand, in reprisal for Davies kicking over his drum kit as revenge for a drunken fight the previous night in a Taunton hotel, apparently won by Mick. He then fled into hiding for days to avoid arrest for grievous bodily harm. On other occasions, fuming, he would hurl his drumsticks at Dave. According to Ray, their problems began during the time Mick and Dave shared a flat in London for a short period in early 1965.

Ultimately, the relationship between Avory and the younger Davies brother deteriorated to the point where Avory left the band. By agreement with Ray Davies, he ceased performing and recording with the band in 1984, but accepted an invitation to manage Konk Studios, where the band and the Davies brothers record most of their records – a position he has held ever since.

Ray explained the situation:

The saddest day for me was when Mick left. Dave and Mick just couldn't get along. There were terrible fights, and I got to the point where I couldn't cope with it any more. Push came to shove, and to avoid an argument I couldn't face. ... we were doing a track called "Good Day" and I couldn't face having Mick and Dave in the studio, so I did it with a drum machine. Dave said he wanted to replace Mick, and ... I took Mick out, and we got very, very drunk. We were in Guildford, and after about five pints of this wonderful scrumpy, Mick said if any other band offered him a tour, he wouldn't take it, because he didn't want to tour. And I remember him getting the train back - because he was banned from driving; it was a very bad year for Mick - and he walked to the station and disappeared into the mist.

In another interview, Ray said:

We got drunk and i finally said "Remember when you came to audition in December 1963? Well, you didn't get the job"

Avory was replaced by Bob Henrit, former drummer with the Roulettes, Unit 4 + 2 and Argent.

Later on, it would seem that Dave Davies and Avory settled their differences, as Avory subsequently played the drums on "Rock 'n' Roll Cities", a track on the Think Visual album written by Dave Davies. Avory was asked to rejoin by Ray Davies, but he declined as he wanted a rest from the non-stop touring, working and performing schedule of two decades.

== Current work (1985–present) ==
Avory was inducted into both the Rock and Roll Hall of Fame in 1990 and the UK Music Hall of Fame in 2005, with original bassist Pete Quaife and the Davies brothers.

In the 1990s, he also formed Shut Up Frank with Dave Clarke (no relation to the Dave Clark of the Dave Clark Five), Noel Redding, and Dave Rowberry of the Animals. They toured extensively, and released two EPs and a live album.

In the mid-1990s, he and Clarke started playing with the Kast Off Kinks, who over the years have enlisted John Dalton, John Gosling, Jim Rodford and Ian Gibbons. He has performed with them ever since, recording an EP and a live album.

Around April 2004 -- at the request of the Animals, who were about to do their 40th anniversary tour -- Chip Hawkes (formerly of the Tremeloes) was asked to form a band to tour along with them. He brought together former original members of British 1960s groups, including himself, Avory, and Eric Haydock of the Hollies, performing as the Class of 64 (referring to the year of the British Invasion), also featuring guitarists 'Telecaster Ted' Tomlin and Graham Pollock. The band have toured around the world, and have recorded an album of their former bands' hits.

In 2007, Avory left the Class of 64 and, with Haydock, Pollock, and Tomlin, formed a new band called the Legends of the Sixties, adding Martin Lyon. Avory made a special guest appearance onstage at Ray Davies' Royal Albert Hall performance on 10 May 20 playing tambourine, guesting alongside Ian Gibbons.

== Personal life ==
Avory lives in Kew, west London and has a daughter. He has stated that she is not "terribly musical". Avory married Marliesa Mladek in January 2018.

== Discography ==
=== With Shut Up Frank ===
EPs

- No More Christmas (1993)
- Another Day in Danger (1993)

Live album

- Alive! (1996)

=== With The Kast-Off Kinks ===
EP

- The Archway EP (2001)

Live album

- Live at The Brook (2010)

== Bibliography ==
- Doug Hinman, All Day and All of the Night: Day by Day Concerts, Recordings and Broadcasts, 1964-1997, Backbeat Books, 2004, ISBN 9780879307653
