= Pete Quaife =

English musician (1943–2010)

Background information
- Born: Peter Alexander Greenlaw Kinnes; 31 December 1943; Tavistock, Devon, England
- Died: 23 June 2010 (aged 66) Copenhagen, Denmark
- Genres: Rock, pop
- Occupation: Musician
- Instrument: Bass guitar
- Years active: 1962–1971, 1981, 1990
- Formerly of: The Kinks

Peter Alexander Greenlaw Quaife (né Kinnes; 31 December 1943 – 23 June 2010) was an English musician, artist and author. He was a founding member and the original bassist for the Kinks, from 1963 until 1969. He also sang backing vocals on some of their records.

Quaife founded a group known as the Ravens in 1962 with brothers Ray and Dave Davies. In late 1963 or early 1964, they changed their name to the Kinks. The group scored several major international hits throughout the 1960s. Their early singles, including "You Really Got Me" and "All Day and All of the Night", have been cited as an early influence on the hard rock and heavy metal genres. In the band's early days, Quaife, who was generally regarded as the best-looking member, was often their spokesman. He departed from the Kinks in 1969 and formed the band Mapleoak, which he left in April 1970.

After retiring from the music business, Quaife resided in Denmark throughout the 1970s. He relocated to Belleville, Ontario, Canada in 1980, where he worked as a cartoonist and artist. He was diagnosed with kidney failure in 1998 and moved back to Denmark in 2005. Quaife died on 23 June 2010 of kidney failure.

== Early life ==
Quaife was born Peter Alexander Greenlaw Kinnes in Tavistock, Devon, to Joan Mary Kilby, who became pregnant during the war after an affair with an American serviceman. Kilby returned to London with her son, where she married Stanley Melville Quaife in 1947, who gave his surname to the young Peter. Quaife attended Coldfall Primary School in Muswell Hill and later William Grimshaw School (now Fortismere School), where a plaque has been erected to his memory by his brother David Quaife and Penny Toumazou.

== The Kinks ==
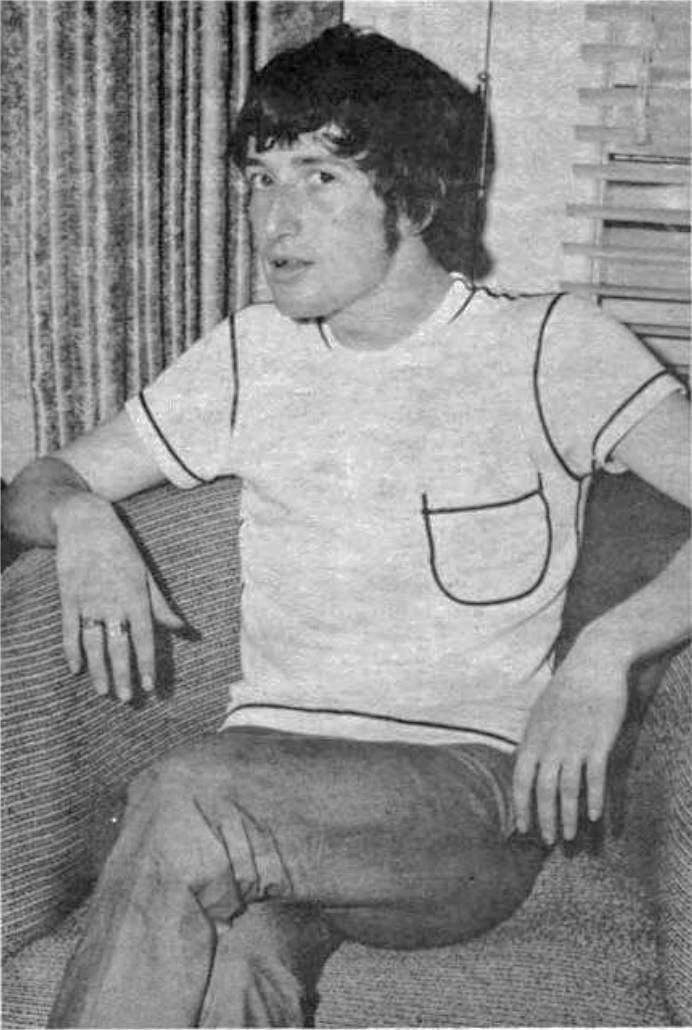
Quaife in June 1965

After a brief period studying commercial art, Quaife formed the Kinks along with school friend Ray Davies in 1962 and subsequently asked Ray's brother Dave to join. The band was originally called the Ravens and performed rhythm and blues at local venues such as the Hornsey Recreation Club at Crouch End Secondary School. The 'Kinks' name came about only upon the signing of a recording contract in late 1963.

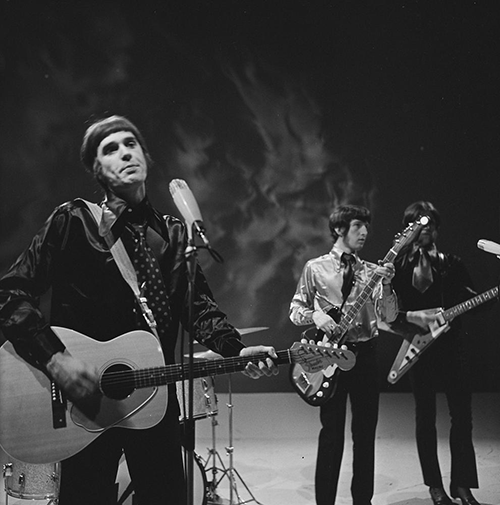
Quaife (middle) playing bass with the Kinks in April 1967

The Kinks became a top chart act throughout the world beginning with their third single, 1964's "You Really Got Me". Quaife was commonly the voice of the band in early press interviews. In June 1966, he was seriously injured in a car crash, which left him unable to perform. He later said that he had enjoyed the time off from the band, as he was sick of the conflict which was constant. John Dalton replaced him, as Quaife resigned from the band as a result of his hospitalisation, but Quaife reconsidered and returned in November 1966.

For the next two years, Quaife played on albums such as Something Else by the Kinks and The Kinks Are the Village Green Preservation Society, and helped rehearse some songs on the album Arthur (Or the Decline and Fall of the British Empire). Quaife left the Kinks permanently in April 1969, but the others did not at first believe him, and only realised his intention when they saw an article in a music paper revealing Quaife's new band. Ray Davies asked him to change his mind and stay, but without success. He was again replaced on bass, this time permanently, by Dalton.

== Mapleoak ==
After leaving the Kinks, Quaife founded a new band, the country/rock group Mapleoak. The band's name derived from the heritage of its members: the 'Maple' represented the two Canadian members of the group, singer-songwriters Stan Endersby and Marty Fisher, while the 'Oak' represented British members Quaife and drummer Mick Cook.

Quaife had contacts in Denmark, so the group gigged heavily there and in the UK during most of 1969 and early 1970. Cook left the band in June 1969, and was replaced by another Canadian: Gordon MacBain, who would write most of the group's original material.

Mapleoak released their first single, "Son of a Gun", in April 1970, but it failed to chart. Quaife then left both the band and the music industry. He subsequently moved to Denmark, and did not appear on Mapleoak's only album, which was released in 1971.

== 1980s and 1990s ==
Quaife never fully returned to the music world as a professional performer. In 1980, he relocated to Belleville, Ontario, Canada to work as a graphic artist. Despite retiring as a professional musician, Quaife continued to play music privately. In a 1988 interview on Canadian television, he reported that he regularly practised classical guitar with a local guitarist, Louise Ford. Quaife's only regular public performances as a musician after his retirement were infrequent appearances playing bass as part of a group at his local church. In 1981, he made his only post 1960s concert appearance with the Kinks, playing bass in an encore number at a show in Toronto. Along with the original Kinks, Quaife was inducted into the Rock and Roll Hall of Fame in 1990. At the ceremony in New York City, Quaife jammed on stage with the other musicians being honoured that year.

Quaife was an active amateur astronomer and was known as a capable astro-photographer who enjoyed the dark skies of the Bay of Quinte area in Ontario, Canada. He was a member of the Royal Astronomical Society of Canada (RASC) and encouraged many people in the science of astronomy.

Quaife was diagnosed with kidney failure in 1998. During dialysis sessions, he drew a series of cartoons based on his experiences. Following their enthusiastic reception by other patients, they were subsequently published in book form as The Lighter Side of Dialysis (Jazz Communications, Toronto, 2004). Though he was invariably known as 'Pete' during his time with the Kinks, Quaife's books are published under the name 'Peter Quaife'.

In 1996, in an interview for Goldmine Magazine, the Who's John Entwistle was asked who his favourite bassist was; he responded: "I'd say one of my favourite bass players was Pete Quaife because he literally drove the Kinks along". Entwistle was not the only musician who thought well of Quaife. Thomas Kitts writes that in early 1966, Eric Clapton invited Quaife to join a band that would eventually become Cream.

== 21st century ==
At the time of his death, Quaife had no formal association with the Kinks, but still enthusiastically talked of his time in the band, and made appearances at fan gatherings. During a Kinks Meeting in Utrecht, Netherlands, in September 2004, he read excerpts from Veritas, his fictional account of a 1960s rock group. He also joined in with the Kast Off Kinks on a few songs.

Quaife lived in Canada for more than two decades, but he moved back to Denmark in 2005 after his marriage ended in divorce, to live with his girlfriend Elisabeth Bilbo, whom he had known since she was a 19-year-old Kinks fan. At the time of his death, they had become engaged to marry.

In 2005, Quaife was inducted into the UK Music Hall of Fame with the Kinks, marking the final reunion of the four original band members. In December 2007, Record Collector published an interview with Ray Davies, in which he was quoted as saying, "I spoke to Quaife about a month ago, and he dearly wants to make another record with me". The tabloid press picked up on this quote, and turned it into a story saying that the Kinks were reforming for a tour in 2008. However, in an interview aired on the Biography Channel in December 2008, Quaife flatly said he would never participate in any type of Kinks reunion. In March 2009, Quaife released a statement that he was permanently retiring from the public eye.

== Death ==
Quaife, who had been receiving kidney dialysis for more than ten years, died on 23 June 2010, aged 66. Two days after Quaife's death, Dave Davies posted a statement on his message board expressing his deep sorrow over the death of his former bandmate and lauding him for his friendship, personality, talent, and contributions to the Kinks' sound. He stated that Quaife "was never really given the credit he deserved for his contribution and involvement [with the Kinks]". Ray Davies dedicated his 27 June performance at the Glastonbury Festival to him and performed several Quaife-era Kinks songs in tribute to him. Davies told the crowd, "I wouldn't be here today if it wasn't for him", and was visibly close to tears as he sang the opening line to "Days". Mick Avory said that Quaife's decision to leave was a shame, adding it "made a big difference" to the band.
