= The Kinks Are Well Respected Men =

Compilation album by the Kinks
- Released: 28 September 1987
- Recorded: 1964–1969
- Genre: Pop music
- Length: 103:12
- Label: PRT PYC 7001
- Producer: Shel Talmy, Ray Davies

The Kinks chronology
Come Dancing with the Kinks: The Best of 1977-1986 (1986)	The Kinks Are Well Respected Men (1987)	25 Years: The Ultimate Collection (1989)

The Kinks Are Well Respected Men is a two disc compilation album by British rock group the Kinks, released in 1987. The album consists of all the non-album singles and B-sides released in the UK by the Kinks from 1964 to 1970. It also includes all of the tracks from the 1964 Kinksize Session EP and the 1965 Kwyet Kinks EP.

The album was issued on both double CD (PYC 7001) and double LP (PYL 7001) formats and is now a much sought-after item due to the excellent sound quality and comprehensive nature of the compilation.

== Track listing ==
All tracks are written by Ray Davies, except where noted.

Disc one
No.	Title	Writer(s)	Original release	Length
1.	"Long Tall Sally"	Enotris Johnson; Richard Penniman; Robert Blackwell	single, 1964	2:04
2.	"You Still Want Me"		single, 1964	1:58
3.	"You Do Something to Me"		B-side to "You Still Want Me"	2:21
4.	"It's All Right"		B-side to "You Really Got Me", 1964	2:36
5.	"All Day and All of the Night"		single, 1964	2:20
6.	"I Gotta Move"		B-side to "All Day and All of the Night"	2:22
7.	"Louie Louie"	Richard Berry	Kinksize Session, 1964	2:55
8.	"I've Got That Feeling"		Kinksize Session	2:41
9.	"I Gotta Go Now"		Kinksize Session	2:52
10.	"Things Are Getting Better"		Kinksize Session	1:52
11.	"Ev'rybody's Gonna Be Happy"		single, 1965	2:15
12.	"Who'll Be the Next in Line"		B-side to "Ev'rybody's Gonna Be Happy"	2:01
13.	"Set Me Free"		single, 1965	2:12
14.	"I Need You"		B-side to "Set Me Free"	2:28
15.	"See My Friends"		single, 1965	2:42
16.	"Never Met a Girl Like You Before"		B-side to "See My Friends"	2:02
17.	"A Well Respected Man"		Kwyet Kinks, 1965	2:40
18.	"Such a Shame"		Kwyet Kinks	2:16
19.	"Wait Till the Summer Comes Along"	Dave Davies	Kwyet Kinks	2:07

Disc two
No.	Title	Writer(s)	Original release	Length
1.	"Don't You Fret"		Kwyet Kinks	2:42
2.	"Dedicated Follower of Fashion"		single, 1966	3:00
3.	"Sittin' on My Sofa"		B-side to "Dedicated Follower of Fashion"	3:03
4.	"I'm Not Like Everybody Else"		B-side to "Sunny Afternoon", 1966	3:26
5.	"Dead End Street"		single, 1966	3:20
6.	"Big Black Smoke"		B-side to "Dead End Street"	2:36
7.	"Act Nice and Gentle"		B-side to "Waterloo Sunset", 1967	2:37
8.	"Autumn Almanac"		single, 1967	3:10
9.	"Mr. Pleasant"		B-side to "Autumn Almanac"	2:58
10.	"Wonderboy"		single, 1968	2:48
11.	"Polly"		B-side to "Wonderboy"	2:50
12.	"Days"		single, 1968	2:52
13.	"She's Got Everything"		B-side to "Days"	3:04
14.	"Plastic Man"		single, 1969	3:02
15.	"King Kong"		B-side to "Plastic Man"	3:02
16.	"Mindless Child of Motherhood"	D. Davies	B-side to "Drivin'", 1969	3:12
17.	"This Man He Weeps Tonight"	D. Davies	B-side to "Shangri-La", 1969	2:41
18.	"Berkeley Mews"		B-side to "Lola", 1970	2:37
