= Four More Respected Gentlemen =

Unreleased album by the Kinks

- For the album cover, Reprise planned to use Harry Goodwin's June 1968 photograph of the Kinks, which NME published in its 6 July 1968 issue (pictured).

Studio album (unreleased) by the Kinks
- Recorded: Late 1967 – June 1968; (except February 1966 for "She's Got Everything")
- Studio: Pye, London
- Genre: Rock
- Label: Reprise
- Producer: Ray Davies; Shel Talmy

The Kinks recording chronology
Something Else by the Kinks (1967)	Four More Respected Gentlemen (1967–1968)	The Kinks Are the Village Green Preservation Society (1968)

Singles from Four More Respected Gentlmen
- 1. "Days" / "She's Got Everything" Released: 24 July 1968

Four More Respected Gentlemen is an unreleased album by the English rock band the Kinks. The project arose out of the band's different American contract schedule, which obligated them to submit a new LP to Reprise Records in June 1968. As the band continued recording their next album, released later in the year as The Kinks Are the Village Green Preservation Society, bandleader Ray Davies submitted fifteen completed master tapes to Reprise. The label planned to issue the LP in the US in November 1968 but abandoned the project only a month beforehand for unclear reasons.

Reprise initially expected to include twelve tracks on Four More Respected Gentlemen, but later resequenced it to have eleven. The eleven tracks were mostly recorded between late 1967 and June 1968 and are generally fast rock songs. Davies later stated that he intended the album to satirise English social etiquette, though commentators dispute his characterisation. Following Reprise's abandonment of the album, its songs were spread across several subsequent releases, including Village Green and the US compilation albums The Kink Kronikles (1972) and The Great Lost Kinks Album (1973). Work on the LP did not proceed beyond the white-label test-pressing stage. As of 2000, only two test pressings are known to exist.

== Background ==
In September 1967, English rock band the Kinks issued their fifth UK studio album, Something Else by the Kinks. Following the album's release, the band began stockpiling numerous recordings for later use without knowing when or in what format they would be released. Bandleader Ray Davies initially thought about making a solo LP, but as recording sessions persisted into June 1968, his idea evolved into plans for the Kinks' next studio album. At that time, the band's UK label, Pye Records, expected to issue their next album during that year's Christmas season. The new project was initially given the working title Village Green before being re-titled The Kinks Are the Village Green Preservation Society in August 1968.

During the 1960s, differences in the royalty structures of the American and British markets meant US labels typically resequenced albums to have fewer tracks than their British counterparts. The Kinks had unique contract schedules for each country which required them to release albums at different times and tailored for each market. By June 1968, as sessions for Village Green continued, the band were contractually obligated to immediately submit a finished LP to their US label, Reprise Records.

== History ==
=== June 1968: Initial plans ===
In the first week of June 1968, Davies selected fifteen finished recordings to send to Reprise to fulfill the Kinks' contractual obligation. After several mono tracks were mixed for stereo, the company entered them into their tape vault on 20 June 1968. After learning from the Kinks' management that the band expected to have another album ready by September, Reprise opted to not issue an album immediately but instead scheduled a November 1968 release. Of the tapes they received, the label initially only used the mono mixes of "Days" and "She's Got Everything", which they issued as a US single on 24 July 1968.

Rather than include all fifteen tracks, Reprise planned to have twelve songs on the album. The project was given the working title Four More Respected Gentlemen, a reference to the band's 1965 US hit single "A Well Respected Man", and a photograph of the band taken by official BBC photographer Harry Goodwin was slated for the album cover. (Note: In his 1994 autobiography, Ray Davies writes the album was going to be called Four More Well-Respected Men, but all other sources refer to it as Four More Respected Gentlemen.)

=== October 1968: Test pressings and cancellation ===
After Reprise made their initial plans for the album in late June 1968, they took no further action until October 1968. At that time, they reduced its planned track listing to eleven songs, began making label-copy sheets for the LP's first pressing and produced several white-label test pressings for technical analysis. (Note: As of 2000, only two test-pressings are known to exist, both of which were in private collections in 1994. In a 2000 piece for Record Collector magazine, Andy Neill valued a mint test-pressing at over £400 (equivalent to £850 in 2023).) Planning continued for the album's cover artwork and the LP was assigned a serial number. (Note: The album was assigned the catalogue number RS 6309.)

It was long thought that production was halted prior to the manufacture of test pressings. However, at least two have come to light in recent years, which strongly suggests the release of [Four More Respected Gentlemen] was cancelled at the eleventh hour, in favour of [The Kinks Are the Village Green Preservation Society].

– Music writer Andy Neill, 2000

Reprise halted work on the album suddenly the same month, a situation which resulted in confusion for the band's fans. Adding to the confusion, the Schwann Long Playing Record Catalog listed the album in error for several months as part of the Kinks' released discography.

Reprise's reasons for cancelling the album are unclear. Band biographers offer competing explanations; John Mendelsohn suggests Davies stopped the album himself out of an apprehension which stemmed from the poor performance of the band's recent singles. (Note: "Wonderboy" (April 1968) and "Days" (June 1968) both failed to chart in the US. In the UK, "Wonderboy" peaked at No. 36 on the Record Retailer chart and did not appear on Melody Maker's chart, thereby ending the band's streak of twelve consecutive top 20 hits.) Peter Doggett writes the label cancelled the album after Davies decided to expand Village Green from twelve to fifteen songs, and Davies himself later suggested that rather than issue two albums in the US, he wanted to include as many tracks as possible on Village Green. Doug Hinman thinks label executives instigated the cancellation after being promised about the quality of Village Green, while Johnny Rogan simply writes it was stopped while Reprise waited for Village Green's UK release. The label did not receive Village Green's master tapes until 20 December 1968 but made no plans to restart the release of Four More Respected Gentlemen.

== Content ==
The fifteen songs Davies sent to Reprise range chronologically from "Autumn Almanac" to "Days", recorded in September 1967 and May–June 1968, respectively, except for "She's Got Everything", which dates to February 1966. Other than "She's Got Everything", the earliest recording on Reprise's eleven-track edition of Four More Respected Gentlemen may have been "Mr. Songbird", recorded around November 1967, though "Monica" and "Phenomenal Cat" could date to any time between late 1967 and May 1968. All of the songs were recorded in the basement studios at Pye Records's London offices. Davies produced all of its tracks, except for "She's Got Everything"; though Shel Talmy produced the song, Reprise credited it to Davies when they issued it as the B-side to "Days". Pye's in-house engineer Brian Humphries likely remixed several of the mono-only tracks for stereo without Davies's involvement.

[Four More Respected Gentlemen] was going to be an LP about manners and things. Table manners. What a joke that all is. The album got mixed in with Village Green and we decided to finish Village Green instead. And instead of having two albums, I tried to put as many tracks on one album as possible.

– Ray Davies, NME

Four More Respected Gentlemen generally includes fast rock numbers, something band biographer Andy Miller thinks Reprise sought to emphasise when editing the album down to eleven tracks. In an interview with NME, Davies stated that he intended the album satirise English social etiquette, table manners and other outdated customs. Rogan counters that in spite of Davies's comment, none of the eleven tracks planned for the album actually satirise etiquette, something he thinks points to either an abandonment of the original concept or mismanagement of the project by the record label. Miller writes that despite the track listing's quick and seemingly random assembly, Davies's songwriting thematically reflects his increasing unease over his personal and professional lives; many of the songs deal with methods of escape, whether by running away ("Polly"), drinking alcohol ("Misty Water"), listening to music ("Mr. Songbird"), being nostalgic ("Picture Book"), having one-night stands ("Berkeley Mews") or by committing suicide ("Did You See His Name").

Following the album's cancellation, Reprise released all of its tracks on Village Green or one of two US-only compilation albums: The Kink Kronikles (1972) and The Great Lost Kinks Album (1973). (Note: The five tracks released on Village Green include "Monica", "Johnny Thunder", "Animal Farm", "Picture Book" and "Phenomenal Cat". The four on The Kink Kronikles are "She's Got Everything", "Polly", "Days" and "Berkeley Mews". The Great Lost Kinks Album includes "Misty Water" and "Mr. Songbird".) Reprise began assembling an early version of the latter compilation in 1969 or 1970, at which time they planned to title it Four More Respected Gentlemen. The eventual title The Great Lost Kinks Album references Gentlemen, though Hinman describes it as misleading since there are only two songs in common between the albums.

== Track listing ==
All songs by Ray Davies, except where noted.

=== Ray Davies's original submission ===
1. "She's Got Everything"
2. "Monica"
3. "Mr. Songbird"
4. "Johnny Thunder"
5. "Polly"
6. "Days"
7. "Animal Farm"
8. "Berkeley Mews"
9. "Picture Book"
10. "Phenomenal Cat"
11. "Misty Water"
12. "Did You See His Name"
13. "Autumn Almanac"
14. "Susannah's Still Alive" (Dave Davies)
15. "There Is No Life Without Love" (D. Davies) (Note: When "There Is No Life Without Love" was released as the B-side to "Lincoln County" in 1968, it was credited to Dave and Ray Davies. On the 2011 compilation album Hidden Treasures, it is instead credited to only Dave, and Miller refers to it as a Dave composition.)

=== Reprise's planned track listing ===
Side one

1. "She's Got Everything"
2. "Monica"
3. "Mr. Songbird"
4. "Johnny Thunder"
5. "Polly"
6. "Days"

Side two

1. "Animal Farm"
2. "Berkeley Mews"
3. "Picture Book"
4. "Phenomenal Cat"
5. "Misty Water"

Notes

- After Reprise received Davies's fifteen tracks in June 1968, they planned to remove "Did You See His Name", "Animal Farm" and "Picture Book" to make it a twelve-song LP. When the label began making test pressings in October 1968, they instead removed "Did You See His Name", "Autumn Almanac", "Susannah's Still Alive" and "There Is No Life Without Love".
- The above listings per Doug Hinman and Andy Miller. The divisions of side one and two are per author Doug Crawford.
