= Then Now and Inbetween =

1969 promotional album by the Kinks

Compilation album (promotional) by the Kinks
- Released: July 1969
- Recorded: 1964–1968 (Note: Andy Miller hypothesises that the Kinks overdubbed additional parts to "Berkeley Mews" in May or June 1969.)
- Studio: Pye and IBC, London
- Length: 37:30
- Label: Reprise
- Producer: Pye (Note: The liner notes describe all songs as "an original Pye Records production", but every track was produced by either Shel Talmy or Ray Davies.)

The Kinks US chronology
The Kinks Are the Village Green Preservation Society (1969)	Then Now and Inbetween (1969)	Arthur (Or the Decline and Fall of the British Empire) (1969)

Singles from Then Now and Inbetween
- 1. "The Village Green Preservation Society" Released: July 1969 (Note: Johnny Rogan writes the single was released in August 1969, as do Doug Hinman and Jason Brabazon in their self-published band discography. Village Green's 50th anniversary release includes a replica of the 7" single, with notes printed on its sleeve stating it was originally released in July 1969.)

Then Now and Inbetween is a promotional compilation album by the English rock band the Kinks. Reprise Records issued the album in July 1969 to journalists, radio program directors and disc jockeys in conjunction with the "God Save the Kinks" promotional campaign, which sought to reestablish the Kinks' commercial status in the US after their four-year ban on performing in the country.

== Background and release ==
In July 1965, the Kinks were informally blacklisted from performing in the United States by the American Federation of Musicians. The circumstances that led to the ban are unclear but likely stemmed from several incidents during the band's first US tour; bandleader Ray Davies later attributed it to a combination of "bad luck, bad management, [and] bad behaviour". (Note: On 2 July 1965, while backstage of Dick Clark's show Where the Action Is, Ray fought a member of the American Federation of Television and Radio Artists. Two days later, the Kinks refused to perform a concert in San Francisco after the promoter declined Ray's request that the band be paid in cash.)

The Kinks' ban persisted until Davies negotiated its resolution in mid-April 1969. In preparation for a return tour of America, the band's first there in over four years, Reprise Records and Warner Bros. Records initiated a promotional campaign to reestablish the band's commercial standing. On 3 July 1969, Davies and band manager Robert Wace attended a meeting with Reprise executives at Warner's headquarters in Burbank, California. Musician John Mendelsohn attended the meeting in an advisory role, having been hired after Reprise read his favourable review of the band's 1969 album The Kinks Are the Village Green Preservation Society. The group formally launched the campaign under the moniker "God Save the Kinks". Mendelsohn came up with the title, which referenced the refrain "God save the village green!" from the close of the song "The Village Green Preservation Society".

As part of the campaign, Reprise mailed press kits to journalists, radio program directors and disc jockeys. The kits included Then Now and Inbetween and other assorted items, such as guide to the Kinks' recordings and a plastic bag with blades of grass from "Daviesland village green". The compilation album was also available to public via mail order for US$2 (equivalent to $18 in 2025). The album has since become a valued collector's item.

== Music ==
The songs on Then Now and Inbetween range chronologically from July 1964 to October 1968 and are a mix of Shel Talmy- and Davies-produced recordings. All of the songs were recorded in the basement studios at Pye Records's London offices, except for "You Really Got Me", which was done at IBC Studios in London.

Then Now and Inbetween marked the first inclusion of "Days" on a US LP. It also featured "Berkeley Mews" a year before its first official release, as the UK B-side to the 1970 single "Lola". The Kinks recorded "Berkeley Mews" in early 1968 during the sessions for Village Green, but band biographer Andy Miller hypothesises that the band may have overdubbed additional parts for the song in anticipation of its inclusion on Then Now and Inbetween. In particular, he focuses on elements which were generally absent from the band's 1968 work, such as the heavier guitar production and the presence of a saxophone. He suggests the saxophone may have been overdubbed around May or June 1969 during the sessions for Arthur (1969), since Dave Davies's song "Mr. Reporter" received a brass overdub around the same time.

== Track listing ==
All songs written by Ray Davies, except where noted.

Side one

1. "Early Chunky Medley" – 3:21

1. "Louie Louie" (Richard Berry)
2. "You Really Got Me"
3. "I Need You"
4. "Till the End of the Day"

2. "A Well Respected Man" – 2:38
3. "Dedicated Follower of Fashion" – 2:59
4. "Dandy" – 2:08
5. "Sunny Afternoon" – 3:33

Side two

1. "David Watts" – 1:52
2. "End of the Season" – 2:05
3. "Sitting by the Riverside" – 1:31
4. "Death of a Clown" (Dave Davies, R. Davies) – 2:25
5. "The Village Green Preservation Society" – 2:45
6. "Last of the Steam-Powered Trains" – 1:22
7. "Big Sky" – 2:12
8. "Berkeley Mews" – 2:34
9. "Days" – 2:50
10. "Waterloo Sunset" – 3:15

== Personnel ==
According to band researcher Doug Hinman:

The Kinks

- Ray Davies – lead vocals, rhythm guitar; piano ("Louie Louie" and "Waterloo Sunset"); Mellotron ("Berkeley Mews" and "Sitting by the Riverside"); (Note: Andy Miller does not specify whether Ray or Hopkins contributed Mellotron on "Sitting by the Riverside" and "Berkeley Mews".) producer (side two, except for "David Watts", "End of the Season" and "Death of a Clown")
- Dave Davies – backing vocals, lead guitar; lead vocals ("David Watts")
- Pete Quaife – backing vocals, bass guitar
- Mick Avory – drums; tambourine ("You Really Got Me" and "Till the End of the Day")

Additional musicians

- Clem Cattini – drums ("Till the End of the Day")
- Rasa Davies – backing vocals
- Bobby Graham – drums ("You Really Got Me")
- Arthur Greenslade – piano ("You Really Got Me")
- Nicky Hopkins – piano; melodica ("Sunny Afternoon"); Mellotron ("Sitting by the Riverside, "Berkeley Mews" and "Days")
- Unknown session musicians – rhythm guitar ("You Really Got Me"), (Note: Hinman writes a guitarist from Edward Kassner's office played additional rhythm guitar, "likely Harry, possibly Bob or Vic, surname unknown".) saxophone ("Berkeley Mews")

Additional production and personnel

- Hy Fujita – album design
- John Mendelsohn – liner notes
- Shel Talmy – producer (side one, "David Watts", "End of the Season" and "Death of a Clown")
