= Mr. Songbird =

1968 song by the Kinks

Song by the Kinks

from the album The Kinks Are the Village Green Preservation Society (European edition)
- Released: 9 October 1968
- Recorded: c. November 1967
- Studio: Pye, London
- Length: 2:25
- Label: Pye
- Songwriter: Ray Davies
- Producer: Ray Davies

Official audio
- "Mr. Songbird" on YouTube

"Mr. Songbird" is a song by the English rock band the Kinks. Written and sung by Ray Davies, it is about a songbird whose call helps the singer's problems go away. Its recording features session musician Nicky Hopkins on Mellotron, duplicating a flute which mimics the call of a bird. Davies included the song on the original 12-track edition of The Kinks Are the Village Green Preservation Society (1968), but removed it from the LP in a last-minute decision to expand the album's track listing. Because the original 12-track edition had already been sent to several European countries, the song's first release was in Sweden and Norway in October 1968. It was first issued in the US on the 1973 compilation The Great Lost Kinks Album and was not officially available in the UK until Village Green's 1998 CD remaster.

== Composition and recording ==
Author Johnny Rogan characterises "Mr. Songbird" as a light lilt, while author Christian Matijas-Mecca compares its bouncy sound to the music on Donovan's 1967 album Mellow Yellow. Composed by Ray Davies, the song's lyrics describe how a songbird's call helps the singer's problems go away. Author Nick Hasted suggests it is about "how songs can save you", while author Andy Miller sees it as reflective of Ray Davies' state of mind while enduring personal and professional hardship, furthering the theme of escapism common in his contemporary songwriting. Miller writes Davies employs his "one hard line" technique in the song, with its final lyric about keeping the devil at bay containing genuine fear.

Though the Kinks began recording most of The Kinks Are the Village Green Preservation Society in March 1968, Davies recalled the band recording "Mr. Songbird" "a long time before" the rest of the album. Kinks researcher Doug Hinman places the song around November 1967 at Pye Studios in London. Miller writes its late 1967 recording puts it around the same time as several other Kinks recordings which make heavy use of a Mellotron – a tape-loop-based keyboard instrument – such as "Lavender Hill" (1973) and "Phenomenal Cat" (1968). Produced by Davies, the recording features soft contributions on bass, drums and Davies' double-tracked lead vocal. Session musician Nicky Hopkins duplicates the sound of a flute with the Mellotron, trilling during the choruses like a songbird. Compiler Andrew Sandoval compares the trills to Zal Yanovsky's guitar work on the Lovin' Spoonful's 1967 song "You're a Big Boy Now".

== Release and reception ==
Davies included "Mr. Songbird" on the original 12-track edition of The Kinks Are the Village Green Preservation Society, sequenced between "Village Green" and "Wicked Annabella". In his September 1968 review of the album for New Musical Express, Keith Altham describes the song as different from the band's typical sound, its simple format being "[a]s obvious as a cup of tea." Approximately two weeks before the album's planned UK release of 21 September, Davies opted to withhold the album for further work, deleting "Mr. Songbird" from the track listing in the process. Therefore, the song does not appear on the 15-track edition of the album as released in the UK and US. While Davies made the change before the album's release, the last-minute nature of his decision meant that production masters had already been sent to several other countries, including Sweden and Norway, where the 12-track edition with "Mr. Songbird" was released on 9 October 1968. Subsequent releases of that edition followed in France, Italy and New Zealand. Among retrospective commentators, Matijas-Mecca writes the song's removal helped give the album "a substantially different feel", but suggests it would have fit "perfectly" with the album's "loose narrative about a desire for a lost England." Miller questions why "Wonderboy" was released as a single in April 1968 in place of the "sublime" "Mr. Songbird", since the latter features both a "blithe melody and toe-tapping arrangement". Geoffrey Himes of Paste magazine likens the lyrics to a Disney film while suggesting its melody is comparable to the best written by musician Paul McCartney.

On 20 June 1968, the Kinks' US record label, Reprise Records, entered "Mr. Songbird" and 16 other new tracks into their tape vaults. The label planned to use the songs on an eventual September 1968 release, Four More Respected Gentlemen, though they postponed the album before eventually cancelling it in October 1968. On 2 July 1969, Davies' delivered another copy of "Mr. Songbird" to Reprise with 11 other "spare tracks", likely out of a contractual obligation. Many of those songs, including "Mr. Songbird", were first issued in the US on the compilation album The Great Lost Kinks Album, released on 25 January 1973. Critic Richie Unterberger of AllMusic counts the song as among the highlights of the compilation, writing that an earlier release of the song "would hardly have embarrassed the group". Rogan instead finds it "a light and delicate piece, hardly crucial but most attractive." "Mr. Songbird" went unreleased in the UK for over 30 years, being first issued in May 1998 on the CD remaster of Village Green.
