= Polly (The Kinks song) =

1968 song by the Kinks

- West German picture sleeve (reverse)

Single by the Kinks
- A-side: "Wonderboy"
- Released: 5 April 1968
- Recorded: March 1968
- Studio: Pye, London
- Genre: Music hall
- Label: Pye (UK); Reprise (US)
- Songwriter: Ray Davies
- Producer: Ray Davies

The Kinks singles chronology
"Autumn Almanac" (1967)	"Wonderboy" / "Polly" (1968)	"Days" (1968)

Official audio
- "Polly" on YouTube

"Polly" (titled "Pretty Polly" on early singles) is a song by the English rock band the Kinks. It was released on a non-album single in April 1968, as the B-side to "Wonderboy". Written and sung by bandleader Ray Davies, the song was recorded in March 1968 during sessions for the band's 1968 album The Kinks Are the Village Green Preservation Society. Ray was initially inspired by the character Polly Garter in Dylan Thomas's 1954 radio drama Under Milk Wood, though his resulting character does not share anything with Thomas's besides the same name. The song is one of the few Kinks recordings from the late 1960s to possibly feature real strings, as arranged by David Whitaker.

== Background and composition ==
Ray Davies composed "Polly" in reference to the character Polly Garter from Welsh poet Dylan Thomas's 1954 radio drama Under Milk Wood. Ray briefly planned to write a suite of songs inspired by Thomas's drama, but the idea instead evolved into the Kinks' 1968 album The Kinks Are the Village Green Preservation Society. Later commentators write that the Polly in Ray's song bears little resemblance to Thomas's character beyond having the same name. In Thomas's drama, Polly Garter is a promiscuous unmarried woman who cares for her many illegitimate children, while in Ray's song, she is a party girl.

I knew a girl who was like that. She ran [the Kinks'] first fan club. She died of junk.

— Ray Davies on "Polly", 1984

Band biographer Andy Miller suggests Ray instead drew his idea for the character from the woman who ran the Kinks' fan club before she died of a heroin overdose. In addition, he writes that the name parallels Pretty Polly, an English brand of women's stockings. (Note: Miller thinks the name may have been a subtle joke, because "[i]f Polly's are the legs on the advertising hoardings, it explains why ... she is such a hit with the fellas".) Author Nick Hasted connects "Polly" to the woman addressed in Ray's song "Starstruck", while author Thomas M. Kitts writes the song is one of several by Ray about "crushed female innocence", including "Little Miss Queen of Darkness" (1966), "Big Black Smoke" (1966) and "Monica" (1968). Author Patricia Gordon Sullivan characterises the song as another of Ray's written in the tradition of music hall.

== Recording and release ==
The Kinks likely recorded "Polly" in March 1968 during the sessions for The Kinks Are the Village Green Preservation Society. (Note: In Doug Hinman and Jason Brabazon's 1994 self-published Kinks discography, they date the recording to late 1967 or early 1968. Later authors like Miller (2003) cite Hinman & Brabazon's book to provide the same dating. In his 2004 book, Hinman updated his dating to "probably" March 1968.) Recording took place in Pye Studio 2, one of two basement studios at Pye Records' London offices. Ray is credited as the song's producer. The four-track mixing console was operated by one of Pye's in-house engineers, either Alan MacKenzie or Brian Humphires. Supplementing the Kinks' regular line-up was Ray's wife Rasa Davies, who contributed backing vocals, and the band's regular session keyboard Nicky Hopkins, who played piano. "Polly" is one of a few songs recorded during the Village Green sessions to possibly feature a real string section, a rarity on the Kinks' late 1960s recordings since Pye executives saw the hiring of an arranger and string players as too expensive to warrant. English composer David Whitaker likely arranged the strings.

In the last week of March 1968, Ray selected "Polly" to be the B-side of the Kinks' next single, "Wonderboy". Pye rush released the single in the UK on 5 April 1968. A reviewer in Record Mirror magazine wrote that in contrast to its A-side, "Polly" is "more rhythmic, maybe with moments of crashingness", and helped provide the single with value-for-money. Reprise Records issued the single in the US on 15 or 22 May 1968. Both sides of the single failed to chart in either the US or UK. In the UK, it sold around 26,000 copies, roughly one-tenth of the Kinks' singles from the previous year, "Waterloo Sunset" and "Autumn Almanac".

Though Ray did not include "Polly" on Village Green, when the Kinks' US recording contract required them to submit a new album to Reprise in June 1968, it was among the fifteen tracks he sent to the label. The song featured on the label's test pressings of the album, planned for a late 1968 release in the US as Four More Respected Gentlemen, though the project was ultimately abandoned. It has since been included on compilation albums like The Kink Kronikles (1972) and Kollectables (1984) and as a bonus track on CD reissues of Something Else by the Kinks (1998) and Village Green (2004).

== Personnel ==
According to band researcher Doug Hinman:

The Kinks

- Ray Davies – lead vocal, guitar
- Dave Davies – backing vocal, electric guitar
- Pete Quaife – backing vocal, bass
- Mick Avory – drums

Additional musicians

- Rasa Davies – backing vocal
- Nicky Hopkins – piano
- David Whitaker – string arrangement
- Unidentified session musicians – string section
