= Phenomenal Cat =

1968 song by the Kinks

Song by the Kinks

from the album The Kinks Are the Village Green Preservation Society
- Released: 22 November 1968
- Studio: Pye, London
- Genre: Psychedelia; music hall
- Length: 2:34
- Label: Pye
- Songwriter(s): Ray Davies
- Producer(s): Ray Davies

Official audio
- "Phenomenal Cat" on YouTube

"Phenomenal Cat" is a song by the English rock band the Kinks from their sixth studio album, The Kinks Are the Village Green Preservation Society (1968). Written and produced by Ray Davies, the song was recorded sometime between late 1967 and May 1968. The song features a Mellotron which duplicates the sound of a flute. It is one of several character studies on Village Green, recounting the story of a flying cat who travels the world, discovers "the secret of life" and spends the rest of his life eating. Commentators have sometimes likened the song to Victorian fairy tales and have often described it as an example of psychedelia.

== Composition ==
=== Lyrics and music ===
"Phenomenal Cat" tells the story of a flying cat who has visited faraway places like Katmandu and Hong Kong. He discovers "the secret of life", though the details of the revelation are not revealed to the listener. In the aftermath of his discovery, he retreats from the world and spends the rest of his life eating in a tree. Songwriter Ray Davies described "Phenomenal Cat" contemporaneously as like a nursery rhyme. Band biographer Johnny Rogan thinks the song resembles a children's story or Victorian fairy tale, comparable to the work of 19th-century English authors like Edward Lear and Lewis Carroll. Academic Patricia Gordon Sullivan considers the song a music hall composition, indicating Ray's continued interest in the genre.

While Ray generally eschewed contemporary music trends in his songwriting, retrospective commentators often describe "Phenomenal Cat" as an example of British psychedelia. Academic Barry J. Faulk thinks the song's psychedelia is driven by its Mellotron contribution – a tape-loop-based keyboard instrument that had been associated with the genre since its use on the Beatles' 1967 single "Strawberry Fields Forever". Musician Steve Alleman instead considers the song's Mellotron one of the few times the Kinks approached psychedelia without actually achieving it. (Note: Allman's other examples include the "strange yawning sound in the bass" on "Lazy Old Sun", the "blastoff intro" of "King Kong" and the "freakout ending" of "Wicked Annabella".) Music researcher Christian Matijas-Mecca adds that the song shares qualities with Syd Barrett's song "Lucifer Sam" from Pink Floyd's album The Piper at the Gates of Dawn (1967), and band biographer Andy Miller compares it to Barrett's song "The Gnome" from the same album. (Note: Miller also compares the song to the Fleur de Lys' "Gong With The Luminous Nose" (1968) and Donovan's April 1968 album A Gift from a Flower to a Garden, a double-LP which combined songs for adults with children's music.) Miller writes that while the song includes elements of psychedelia – such as its embrace of Lear and Carroll – he considers those elements to be surface level. He writes that while Ray "shared the British psychedelic's scenes pastoral idealization of lost youth", Ray differed in thinking that one could never return to one's youth.

=== Interpretation ===
I don't like to think there's a moral to it. He ate himself to eternity. That's what he wanted to do.

– Ray Davies on "Phenomenal Cat", 1976

In a 1976 interview, Ray denied that the song had a moral, though commentators have offered their own interpretations. Miller considers the song as one of several character studies to appear on The Kinks Are the Village Green Preservation Society (1968) and one of several songs which contemplates the dangerous appeal of the past. He writes the character of the cat is "the same ambiguous figure" as the one who sits lazily by the river in "Sitting by the Riverside", flips through the photo album in "Picture Book", or who lives in a museum in "Last of the Steam-Powered Trains". He writes that in the same way "Last of the Steam-Powered Trains" was a satire on the contemporary R&B movement in Britain, "Phenomenal Cat" may have been a satire on the psychedelic scene. Rogan similarly thinks the song is a satire on the late-1960s trend of searching for spiritual enlightenment. In particular, Rogan thinks Ray may have been satirising his contemporaries, like Pete Townshend in his following of Indian spiritual master Meher Baba or the Beatles learning Transcendental Meditation from Maharishi Mahesh Yogi.

Academic Ken Rayes thinks the song is about conspicuous consumption. He considers it a "gentle, nuanced portrait of the temptations of capitalist materialism", contrasted against the more "spiritually and emotionally fulfilling possibilities" offered by the village green. He thinks Ray may have sought to caricature rock businessman Allen Klein with the song, writing that the cat parallels Ray's description of Klein in his 1994 autobiography. (Note: In his autobiography, Ray discusses his first meeting with Klein. He compares Klein's appearance to overweight comedian Lou Costello and describes him as arrogant in his recounting of his previous exploits.)

== Recording ==
The beginning of "Phenomenal Cat"
The recording's flute opening was achieved by holding down the keys on the Mellotron and allowing each tape loop to spool all the way through.

The Kinks recorded "Phenomenal Cat" sometime between late 1967 and May 1968, during a period when the band recorded numerous songs without initially knowing when or in what format they would be released. (Note: In Doug Hinman and Jason Brabazon's 1994 self-published Kinks discography, they date the recording to "late 1967/mid-1968". Later authors like Peter Doggett (1998) and Miller (2003) cite Hinman & Brabazon's book to provide the same dating. In his 2004 book, Hinman updated his dating to a range of autumn 1967 to May 1968.) Recording took place in Pye Studio 2, one of two basement studios at Pye Records' London offices. Ray produced the song, while Pye's in-house engineer Alan "Mac" MacKenzie operated the four-track mixing console.

The song's backing track combines a flute, woodwinds and tambourine, played against electric guitar and Mick Avory's drums. Avory deadened the sound on his drums by placing newspaper over a floor tom. The woodwind instruments were produced via Mellotron. The recording's distinctive flute introduction was accomplished by holding down the Mellotron's keys and allowing each tape loop to spool through. Ray's lead vocal is double tracked, while Dave Davies sings as the cat. Dave's voice was altered by recording the master tape slowly and then playing it sped-up. Ray and Dave do not fully harmonise until the song's ending, before Dave's vocal fades away.

== Release and reception ==
"Phenomenal Cat" was among the songs Ray selected for the aborted US album Four More Respected Gentlemen, originally planned for a late 1968 release. He also included the song on his original twelve-track edition of The Kinks Are the Village Green Preservation Society. In the United Kingdom, Pye initially planned for a 27 September 1968 release of the album, though Ray opted to halt its release in mid-September to expand its track listing. (Note: Release of the twelve-track LP went ahead in Sweden and Norway on 9 October 1968, with subsequent releases of that edition following in France, Italy and New Zealand.) Pye released the fifteen-track edition of the album in the UK on 22 November 1968. "Phenomenal Cat" is on side two, between "Starstruck" and "All of My Friends Were There". The original release included several discrepancies between the titles listed on the album sleeve and those on the LP's central label; on the sleeve, "Phenomenal Cat" was misspelled "Phenominal Cat".

In his September 1968 preview of Village Green for New Musical Express, critic Keith Altham wrote that "Phenomenal Cat" is an example of "one of those intriguing figments of Ray's meandering mind"; he concludes that the song includes a moral for those who read close enough, while other listeners can enjoy its "pleasant nursery rhyme". In an otherwise positive review of the album for The Village Voice, critic Robert Christgau criticised the song for its "impersonal artiness", writing that it "might have been turned out by some Drury Lane whimsy specialist". In a retrospective assessment, Morgan Enos of Billboard stated that rather than follow the plot, the listener can appreciate Dave's "crooning" vocal and the "mellow, stony" Mellotron.
