= Big Sky (song) =

1968 song by the Kinks

Song by the Kinks

from the album The Kinks Are the Village Green Preservation Society
- Released: 22 November 1968
- Recorded: c. 12 October 1968
- Studio: Pye, London
- Genre: Pop, rock
- Length: 2:50
- Label: Pye
- Songwriter: Ray Davies
- Producer: Ray Davies

Official audio
- "Big Sky" on YouTube

"Big Sky" is a song by the English rock band the Kinks. Written and sung by Ray Davies, it was released in November 1968 on the album The Kinks Are the Village Green Preservation Society. Ray has typically avoided providing a direct answer on the song's meaning, but commentators often interpret it as describing God as unsympathetic towards the problems of humans.

Ray composed the song in January 1968 in Cannes, France, after watching people walk beneath the sunrise from his hotel balcony. The Kinks recorded it in October 1968, making it among the last songs recorded for Village Green. Ray's lead vocal alternates between singing, speaking and harmonising with his brother, Dave; Ray's wife, Rasa, contributes a wordless falsetto harmony. Though Ray later disparaged his vocals and the song's production, contemporary reviewers and retrospective commentators have described it in favourable terms, highlighting its songwriting, while disputing its level of thematic cohesion with the other songs on Village Green. It is one of only two songs from the album that the Kinks performed live, including it in their set list from its release through 1971. Yo La Tengo and Matthew Sweet have each covered the song.

== Background and composition ==
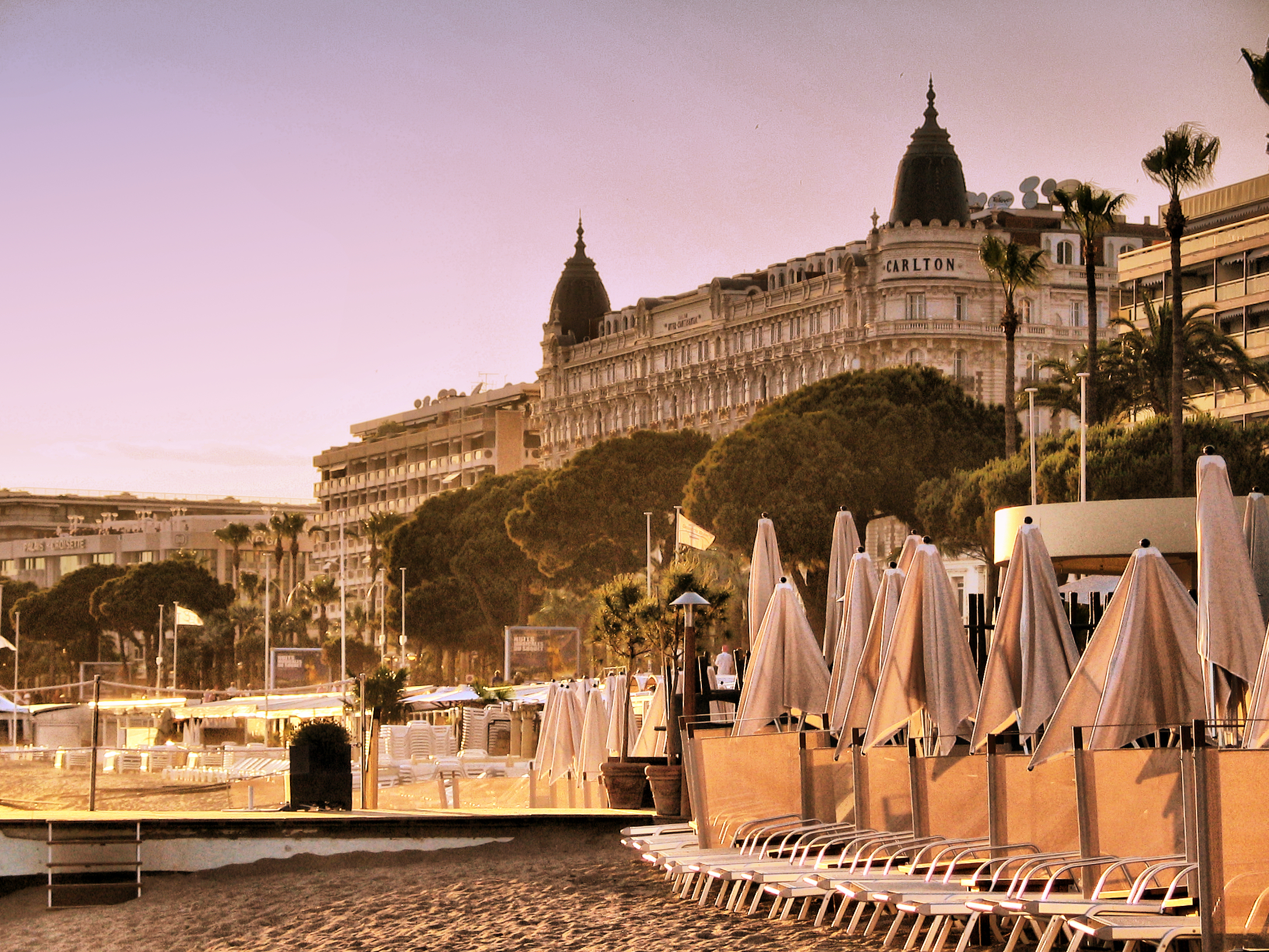
The Carlton Hotel in Cannes, France (pictured 2004), where Ray Davies composed the song

Ray Davies composed "Big Sky" in January 1968 while visiting Cannes, France. At the request of his song publisher, Ray was attending the second annual MIDEM Music Publishers Festival, an international music industry convention, hoping it would help boost his position in the record industry. He later recalled watching the sunrise from his balcony at the Carlton Hotel: "I spent an evening with all these people doing deals. The next morning ... I watched the sun come up and I looked at them all down there, all going out to do their deals. That's where I got the 'Big Sky looking down at all the people' line. It started from there." (Note: In 2002, Ray alternatively recalled it as a sunset, rather than a sunrise, and stated that after interacting with the "suits" the first night of the event, he opted to check out early the following morning. Band researcher Doug Hinman instead writes Ray arrived in Cannes for the event on 24 January 1968 and returned to London on the 27th.) Ray later stated that watching the businessmen from his hotel made him imagine "a being somewhat bigger than all the hustlers around me", but that rather than dealing with his dissatisfaction of the music business, the resulting lyrics are instead "more about the struggle of ordinary human beings surviving in the modern world".

Commentators have often interpreted the lyrics of "Big Sky" as relating to God, though when asked directly, Ray has typically avoided providing a direct answer. In a 1968 interview with Melody Maker, he denied that the "Big Sky" of the lyrics was God and instead said it referred only to "a big sky". Author Johnny Rogan finds Ray's comment both "reductive and obtuse" and suggests he was hesitant to discuss any potential theological theme due to fears of being misinterpreted. (Note: Ray later stated that, though he was raised non-religious and is thereby wary of discussing God, he is actually "quite religious". He continued: "If God's an influence on something, I don't want to tell everyone about it. If the influence is there it'll come out without mentioning it.") In a 2015 interview, Ray suggested the song's central meaning related to the triviality of personal problems when compared with the issues of the world at large. Author Andy Miller suggests the term "Big Sky" may have been influenced by the 1952 Howard Hawks film, The Big Sky, while critic Paul Williams suggests Ray drew the lyrics thematically from the 1897 short story "The Open Boat" by Stephen Crane.

Most authors write that the song describes God as unsympathetic to the problems of humans and too preoccupied to interact with them, heard in the line, "People lift up their hands and they look up to the big sky / But big sky is too big to sympathise'." Author Thomas M. Kitts writes that the song's lyrics attempt to resolve humans' suffering and their relationship with God, and that its central theme relates to "the smallness of human action in the overall scheme of a vast universe and divine indifference". He writes that the singer takes consolation at Big Sky's indifference, as in the line, "When I think that the world is too much for me / I think of the Big Sky and nothing matters much to me." Miller similarly writes the song finds solace in the indifference of God, since compared to the Big Sky, humans' issues are small. (Note: Scholar Michael Mooradian Lupro alternatively interprets the "Big Sky" as embodying not only God, but also "[t]he god-like bureaucrat(s)" who want to help citizens, but find that the large scale of national governments and bureaucracies prevent sympathy from extending to individual citizens.) Author Christian Matijas-Mecca describes "Big Sky" as an example of introspective rock music that began appearing post-psychedelia, writing that the singer's detachment from both society and himself is channelled into "a hoped-for state of being".

== Recording and release ==
"Big Sky" was among the last tracks recorded for The Kinks Are the Village Green Preservation Society. The Kinks recorded it in October 1968 during a series of sessions meant to increase the album from twelve to fifteen songs. (Note: Due to the loss or destruction of most of Pye Studios' 1960s documentation, the exact recording date is difficult to establish. Band researcher Doug Hinman writes it was around 12 October 1968, while acknowledging no firm dating is possible.) Due to the nine-month gap between its writing and recording, Miller suggests that Ray may have initially intended to keep the song for a solo album, but that once plans for a possible solo project had dissolved, he instead opted to include it on Village Green.

Maybe I wasn't the right person to sing it. Knowing I got the image across and the fact that a lot of people like the song is enough. But my performance is really bad ... It just wasn't recorded properly ...

— Ray Davies on "Big Sky", 1984

The band recorded "Big Sky" in Pye Studio 2, one of two basement studios at Pye Records' London offices. Ray is credited as the song's producer, while Pye's in-house engineer Brian Humphries operated the four-track mixing console. It features Ray on lead vocal, alternating between singing and speaking; Ray interpreted the spoken section as being "like the voice of God", while his brother, Dave Davies, later suggested he was impersonating American actor Burt Lancaster. (Note: In a 1970 interview with Jonathan Cott of Rolling Stone, Ray expressed, "I'd like to hear Burt Lancaster singing 'Big Sky.'") Other vocal contributions include a shared harmony vocal between the brothers, as well as a wordless falsetto harmony from Ray's wife, Rasa Davies. For the instrumentation, Dave plays what Kitts describes as a "muscular, hard-pushing guitar riff", alongside the "forceful drumming" of Mick Avory.

Pye released Village Green in the United Kingdom on 22 November 1968, sequencing "Big Sky" on side one between "Last of the Steam-Powered Trains" and "Sitting by the Riverside". (Note: Because it was among the songs added to the album late in the production process, "Big Sky" does not appear on the original 12-track album, as released in France, Sweden, Norway, Italy and New Zealand, and as reviewed by Keith Altham in September 1968 for New Musical Express.) Reflecting in 1984, Ray expressed that "Big Sky" was one of his favourite songs, though he was unsatisfied with the finished recording, finding his vocal performance and the production wanting.

== Critical reception ==
=== Contemporary reviews ===
While Village Green generally went unnoticed by contemporary critics and listeners, the founder of Crawdaddy magazine, Paul Williams, published an influential guest-review in the 14 June 1969 issue of Rolling Stone magazine. In it, he declares Ray a genius, further writing that "[h]earing 'Big Sky' on this new album, I know we'll get along just fine." He singles out the line, "I think of the big sky and nothing matters much to me", describing it as an experience he has shared. In the April 1969 edition of The Village Voice, critic Robert Christgau characterises "Big Sky" as "an acrimonious anti-religious song which exemplifies fictional song technique", and that it achieves the difficult task of writing a song that says, "'God is horrible because he lets people suffer.'"

=== Retrospective assessment ===
In a retrospective assessment, critic Rick Clark of the All Music Guide (now AllMusic) describes "Big Sky" as one of Village Green's highlights, and author Andy Miller praises the song in laudatory terms, designating it the creative peak of the album while comparing it to the best work of Lennon–McCartney and Bob Dylan. He disputes Ray's disparagement of the song's production, finding it instead, "perfectly balanced", "scintillating in design and execution" and "some of the most beautiful, thunderous music [the Kinks] ever recorded". He concludes it marks the end of Ray's creative peak, a period he determines began in 1966 with "Sunny Afternoon". Kitts finds Miller's assessment excessive, but suggests the song is among the best of those dealing in similar themes, such as John Lennon's 1971 song "Imagine". Author Nicholas Schaffner describes the song as "the closest [Ray] ever came to a theological statement", while Mendelssohn characterises it as "probably the most cogent expression of the precept that religion is the opiate of the people in rock history."

Author Olga Ruocco connects the song lyrically to Ray's 1967 song "Lazy Old Sun" – recorded for the band's previous album, Something Else – a connection Rogan also makes, suggesting that both songs employ a similar method of lyrical pondering. Critic Rob Sheffield compares "Big Sky" to another of Ray's 1967 songs, "Waterloo Sunset", writing that it transports the listener to "an equally unforgiving country locale" with a sense of resignation that is "almost mystical". Kitts further suggests that the resignation of the singer hints at a death wish, something he relates to other songs on Village Green, like "Johnny Thunder", "Phenomenal Cat" and "Sitting by the Riverside".

Author Clinton Heylin describes "Big Sky" as a "choice cut", being a major statement on Ray's part and an indication that he "could not suppress a more autobiographical view of the world". However, he criticises the song for departing from the album's concept, having more in common with the themes of the Kinks' next two albums and "[sending it] some place that was more Muswell Hill than village green". (Note: Lupro also draws comparison with the Kinks' next album, Arthur (Or the Decline and Fall of the British Empire) (1969), writing that the "Big Sky" character serves as "the ultimate bureaucrat", being similar to the characters that "paternalistically keep Arthur in his 'paradise.'") Miller likewise views the song as a departure from Village Green's central themes of memory and desire, and Morgan Enos of Billboard magazine writes it deals in "heavenly" concerns where the rest of the album is largely "terrestrial". By contrast, Kitts finds that, though "Big Sky" and "Last of the Steam-Powered Trains" were not recorded until late in the album's production, both "now seem indispensable to the concept of Village Green". He writes that while "Big Sky" deals less in specific characters than in larger "statements and questions", it fits into the album through its themes of "contemplation" and "yearning for understanding". Jem Aswad of Variety magazine instead sees the song as another of the album's "vivid" character studies, with its central character being "the almighty", and author Mark Doyle writes that though several of the album's characters do not seem to directly interact with one another, "it is easy to imagine them all coming together under the benevolent (but non-interventionist) 'Big Sky'".

== Other versions ==
"Big Sky" is one of two tracks from Village Green that the Kinks added to their live set list, including it from 1968 through 1971. Miller describes a heavy rock performance of "Big Sky" at the Fillmore West in 1970 as resembling Jimi Hendrix's version of "Hey Joe", though he concludes the treatment is "horrible", with Ray's "beautiful words" hidden under the guitar work of Dave. Kitts instead finds that the version demonstrates the band's tightness, highlighting the "inventiveness and precision" of Dave's guitar work.

On the suggestion of musician Clint Conley, American indie rock band Yo La Tengo covered "Big Sky" for their 1986 debut album, Ride the Tiger. The song was the first on which drummer Georgia Hubley contributed backing vocals. Reviewing the album for AllMusic, Mark Deming describes the cover favourably, writing that "any band that can cover the Kinks and Pete Seeger on the same album and make them both work must be doing something right." American musician Matthew Sweet recorded a cover of the song, released on the 2002 tribute album This Is Where I Belong: The Songs Of Ray Davies & The Kinks. In Tom Semioli's review of the album for AllMusic, he writes that the cover sounds "as fresh and vital as the day [it was] written", while Rob Mitchum of Pitchfork calls it "inessential", criticising it for being too similar to the original.
