= Monica (Kinks song) =

1968 song by the Kinks

Song by the Kinks

from the album The Kinks Are the Village Green Preservation Society
- Released: 22 November 1968
- Studio: Pye, London
- Genre: Calypso
- Length: 2:13
- Label: Pye
- Songwriter: Ray Davies
- Producer: Ray Davies

Official audio
- "Monica" on YouTube

"Monica" is a song by the English rock band the Kinks from their sixth studio album, The Kinks Are the Village Green Preservation Society (1968). Written and sung by Ray Davies, the song was recorded sometime between late 1967 and May 1968. The song features congas and a syncopated rhythm, indicating Davies's continued interest in calypso music. Its lyrics are a serenade for a prostitute and were partly inspired by Dylan Thomas's radio drama, Under Milk Wood (1954), though Davies kept the lyrics deliberately subtle to avoid a radio ban. Retrospective commentators have disputed the song's level of thematic cohesion with the others on Village Green.

== Background and composition ==
I like the way I did "Monica" ... I didn't actually say she was a prostitute ... so it can apply to a lot of other people ... If you say somebody is a prostitute or a hooker you're restricted. Like "Miss Straight-back" who goes to work in the morning and doesn't do anything else isn't affected by it. I suppose that if you don't say that she's a prostitute she might see little things in the song about herself.

– Ray Davies, 1976

Ray Davies composed "Monica" as a love song, sung as a serenade to a prostitute. Its lyrics are deliberately subtle, never directly referencing her profession, something that arose out of Davies' desire to avoid a ban by BBC Radio. The song's narrator claims Monica for himself, but sings that while she is a prostitute her love cannot be bought. Davies may have been inspired by the prostitute character Polly Garter from Under Milk Wood, a 1954 radio drama by Welsh poet Dylan Thomas. The drama began to influence Davies's songwriting in late 1966, and he later directly referenced Garter in his composition "Polly", probably recorded around March 1968. Under Milk Wood's format of exploring characters in a small Welsh town later served as Davies's broader inspiration for the Kinks' 1968 album The Kinks Are the Village Green Preservation Society. Author Mark Doyle suggests that in addition to Garter, the woman addressed in "Monica" may have been inspired by fellow Under Milk Wood character, Gossamer Beynon, the local school teacher whom all the men in town desire. Author Thomas M. Kitts writes that in "Monica", Davies uses a typical trick of Thomas whereby a single word in a stock phrase is altered – in particular, Davies changes the phrase "morning to midnight" into "morning to moonshine".

Musically, "Monica" is an example of calypso music, a genre Davies first explored in his 1965 song "I'm on an Island". (Note: Miller writes the genre reappears in Davies' songs "Apeman" (1970) and "Supersonic Rocket Ship" (1972), but thinks that with "Monica" Davies "fortunately ... eschews the cod-Jamaican delivery" heard on the later singles.) Author Johnny Rogan suggests Davies often used calypso as a contrast against his more serious songwriting and compares its "Acapulco-style beat" to another of his songs on Village Green, "Starstruck". Kitts thinks the calypso rhythm is meant to suggest that the song takes place in the narrator's fantasy and emphasise that he actually only possesses Monica in his mind. Author Ken Rayes describes the song's arrangement as "celebratory" in its incorporation of Caribbean rhythms, jazz tempo changes and a playful vocal from Davies suggesting a schoolboy-like innocence.

== Recording and release ==
The Kinks recorded "Monica" sometime between late 1967 and May 1968, during a period when the band recorded numerous songs without initially knowing when or in what format they would be released. (Note: In Doug Hinman and Jason Brabazon's 1994 self-published Kinks discography, they date the recording to spring 1968. Later authors like Peter Doggett (1998) and Miller (2003) cite Hinman & Brabazon's book to provide the same dating. In his 2004 book, Hinman updated his dating to a range of autumn 1967 to May 1968.) Recording took place in Pye Studio 2, one of two basement studios at Pye Records' London offices. Davies produced the song, while Pye's in-house engineer Alan "Mac" MacKenzie operated the four-track mixing console. The song features a syncopated backing track, including an acoustic guitar, congas and organ. Bass guitar does not appear until the second verse.

"Monica" was among the songs Davies selected for the aborted US album Four More Respected Gentlemen, originally planned for a late 1968 release. While sessions for Village Green continued through the summer of 1968, the Kinks performed the song for BBC Radio on 1 and 9 July 1968. (Note: The latter performance was later featured on the 2001 release BBC Sessions 1964–1977.) Davies planned to include "Monica" on the original twelve-track edition of Village Green and he kept the song on the album when he decided to expand it to fifteen tracks, though he changed the planned sequence from the first to the second side of the LP. Pye released Village Green in the UK on 22 November 1968, with "Monica" sequenced as the penultimate track. In his preview of the album for New Musical Express magazine, critic Keith Altham wrote that "Monica" is an example of "the beauty of [Ray Davies]" in that "you are never quite sure when to take him seriously".

Among retrospective commentators, Miller considers "Monica" "the flimsiest thing" on the album, and Morgan Enos of Billboard placed it last in his ranking of the songs. Rogan considers the song and "Starstruck" to be "distinctly un-Village Green compositions", while Kitts counters that it fits into the album with its theme of escapism through obsession, something he thinks is also heard on "Starstruck" and "Phenomenal Cat". Kitts and Miller each consider the song one of the album's several character studies.
