= Starstruck (The Kinks song) =

1969 single by the Kinks

- Dutch picture sleeve

Single by the Kinks

from the album The Kinks Are the Village Green Preservation Society
- B-side: "Picture Book"
- Released: 8 January 1969 (Note: The US single's release was possibly delayed a week to 15 January.)
- Recorded: July 1968
- Studio: Pye, London
- Genre: Beat music, rock
- Length: 2:22
- Label: Reprise
- Songwriter: Ray Davies
- Producer: Ray Davies

The Kinks US singles chronology
| "Days" (1968) | "Starstruck" (1969) | "The Village Green Preservation Society" (1969) |

Official audio
- "Starstruck" on YouTube

"Starstruck" is a song by the English rock band the Kinks from their 1968 album The Kinks Are the Village Green Preservation Society. Written and sung by Ray Davies, the song was recorded in July 1968. The song was issued as the album's lead single in continental Europe in November 1968 and in the United States in January 1969. The European release was accompanied by a promo film shot in Waterlow Park, Highgate. The song failed to chart anywhere besides the Netherlands, where it reached No. 13 on the Veronica Top 40 and No. 9 on the Hilversum 3 Top 30.

An example of rock and beat music, "Starstruck" features a Mellotron which duplicates the sound of a string section. The lyrics are directed towards a female listener whom the singer politely chastises for failing to distinguish between stardom and real life. Retrospective commentators dispute the song's level of thematic cohesion with the others on Village Green; some suggest a lack of relation to the album's themes, while others contend it fits in with notions of escapism and a contrasting of rural and urban life.

== Background and recording ==
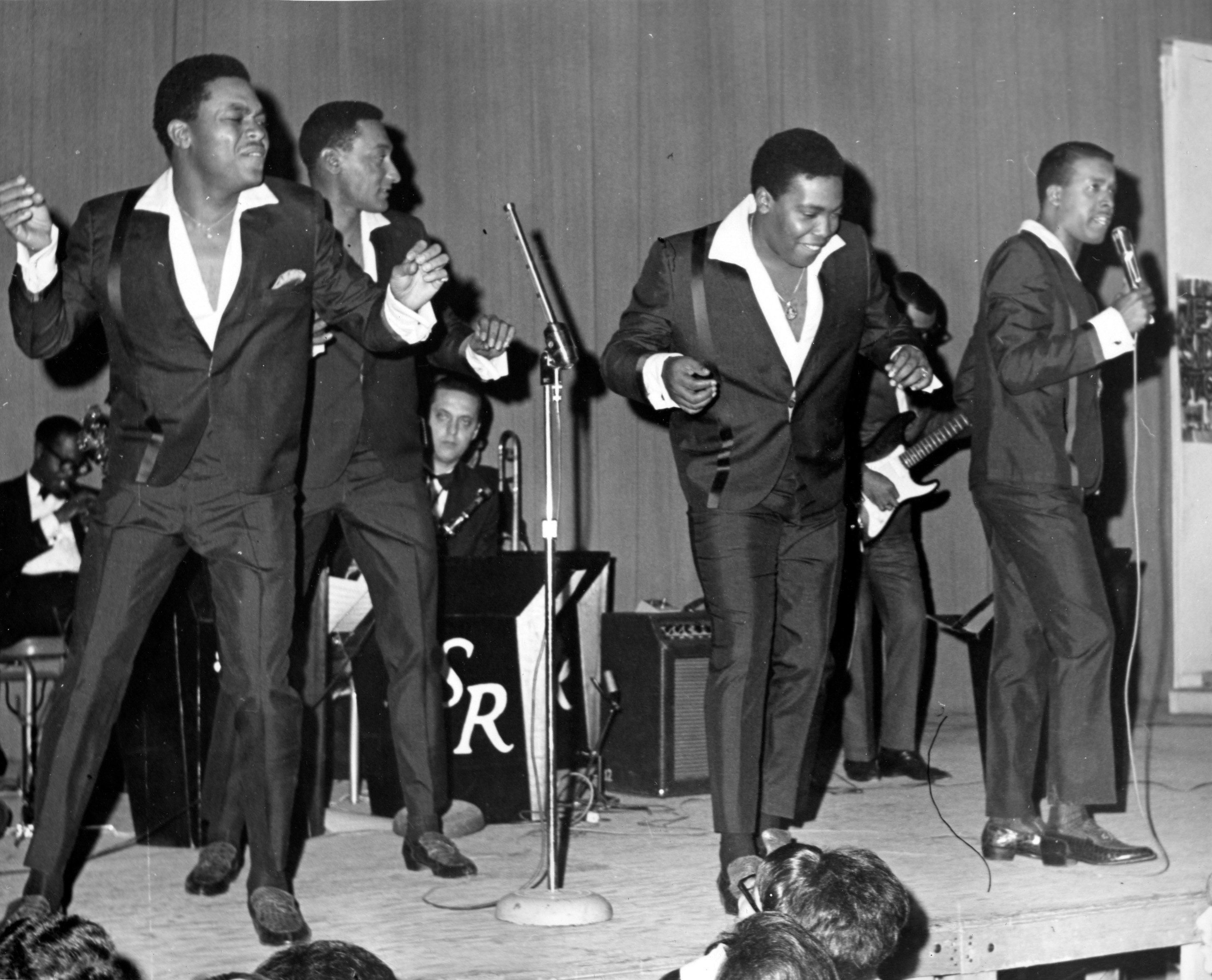
Ray Davies described "Starstruck" as a tribute to Motown groups like the Four Tops (pictured 1967) and the Temptations.

Ray Davies said in 2002 that he wrote "Starstruck" as a tribute to his favourite Motown groups, including the Four Tops and the Temptations. Author Andy Miller writes that while Davies's suggested Motown connection is difficult to discern, it has a slight resemblance to the Four Tops' 1965 single "It's the Same Old Song", particularly the melody and "the snap of Mick Avory's snare drum". Avory commented, "I quite like 'Starstruck'. ... [T]he drum sounds seemed to be different than some of the other tracks".

Author Johnny Rogan writes Davies may have written the song for a groupie, but adds that the singer's "delicate and polite chastising" makes it an unlikely possibility.

The Kinks recorded "Starstruck" in July 1968 in Pye Studio 2, one of two basement studios at Pye Records' London offices. Davies is credited as the song's producer, while Pye's in-house engineer Brian Humphries operated the four-track mixing console. The recording features a typical Kinks line-up of acoustic guitar, bass, drums, piano, vocal harmonies and handclaps, with Davies singing lead vocals. It also includes a Mellotron – a tape-loop-based keyboard instrument – played by either session keyboardist Nicky Hopkins or Davies to duplicate the sound of a string section. Davies mixed the recording quickly in August 1968, but remixed it in late October after the release of The Kinks Are the Village Green Preservation Society was delayed by two months. (Note: The resulting mono mix is a few seconds longer than the stereo.)

== Composition ==
=== Music ===
Rogan writes "Starstruck" musically displays "a distinct Acapulco-flavouring", indicating Davies's continued interest in calypso music, while he thinks its vocal harmonies are influenced by the contemporary American band the Turtles. Critic Jonathan Cott instead suggests the song was inspired by musician Buddy Holly. Author Christian Matijas-Mecca writes the song is based in beat music and has a "tight soul feel", while author Jon Savage considers it one of the album's rock songs.

=== Lyrics ===
In the song's lyrics, the singer politely chastises a female listener for failing to distinguish between stardom and real-life and further warns her about the risks of city life. Davies later expressed surprise that the song appeared on Village Green, suggesting it sounds like something "that should be on somebody's solo album". Retrospective commentators dispute the song's level of thematic cohesion with the others on the album. Matijas-Mecca describes the song as "an awkward fit", and Rogan thinks it and "Monica" are "distinctly un-Village Green compositions". Author Nick Hasted contends the album's loose concept allowed for the song's inclusion, while author Thomas M. Kitts asserts it fits with the theme of escapism.

Miller writes the song's warning about city life is similar thematically to other songs Davies was writing around the same time, like "Village Green" (1968), "Berkeley Mews" (1970)" and "Polly" (1968), and author Ken Rayes writes its comparison helps contrast "rural with urban, spirituality with materialism, and the natural with the manufactured". Kitts also compares the song to other Davies compositions, particularly in its theme of "crushed female innocence", which he thinks has precedent in songs like "Little Miss Queen of Darkness" (1966), "Polly" and "Big Black Smoke" (1966).

== Release and reception ==
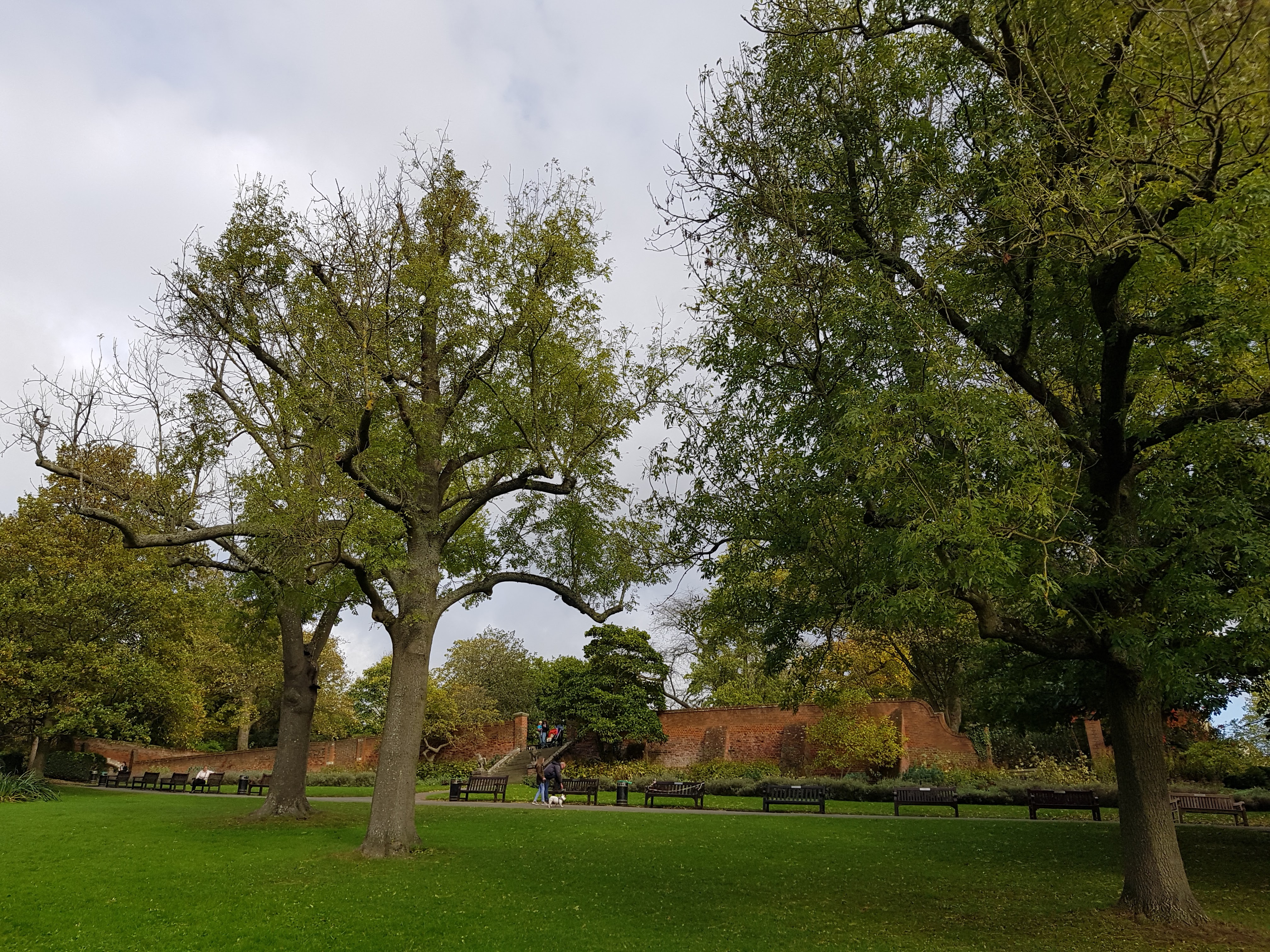
The Kinks filmed their promo clip for the European single in Waterlow Park, Highgate (pictured 2017).

Davies included "Starstruck" on both the twelve- and fifteen-track editions of The Kinks Are the Village Green Preservation Society, sequenced on the second side in both cases. Pye first released the twelve-track edition in Sweden and Norway on 9 October 1968, while the UK release of the album with fifteen tracks followed on 22 November. In his preview of the album for New Musical Express magazine, critic Keith Altham described the song's use of the Mellotron as "extremely clever".

"Starstruck" was issued as a single in November 1968 in parts of continental Europe, including West Germany and Scandinavia, backed with "Picture Book". To promote the release, the Kinks filmed a black-and-white promotional film in late November 1968. The film depicts them walking around Waterlow Park in Highgate on a cold day and is similar in style to the photographs taken for Village Green's album cover in mid-August. The Dutch NCRV television programme Twien first broadcast it on 27 December 1968. (Note: The film has been featured in several band documentaries and is likely the last surviving footage of the Kinks' original 1960s line-up, as Pete Quaife departed the group in March 1969.) In the Netherlands, the single reached No. 13 on the Veronica Top 40 and No. 9 on the Hilversum 3 Top 30. The song also appeared on the Ultratip bubbling under chart in Belgium's French-speaking region of Wallonia.

In the US, Reprise Records issued "Starstruck" as Village Green's lead single on 8 January 1969, again backed with "Picture Book", though its release may have been delayed until the 15th. The single initially received little critical attention, as Reprise neglected to send review copies to American magazines. A reviewer in the New York syndicated-radio newspaper Go! described the song as "a nice, light happy sound" which would contrast well against the heavier sound of contemporary music. Reviewers in both Cash Box and Billboard predicted the single would help the Kinks return to each magazine's chart, though it ultimately failed to position in any American chart. In his review of Village Green for The Village Voice, Robert Christgau counted "Starstruck" as a strength on the album for seeming to have been written for a real person. English filmmaker Edgar Wright included the song in Last Night in Soho, a 2021 film set in 1960s Swinging London, and it was included on the associated soundtrack album.

== Personnel ==
According to band researcher Doug Hinman, except where noted:

The Kinks

- Ray Davies – lead vocal, piano, Mellotron; (Note: Hinman writes Mellotron was contributed by either Hopkins or Ray Davies.) producer
- Dave Davies – backing vocal, acoustic guitar
- Pete Quaife – backing vocal, bass
- Mick Avory – drums
- Unidentified (played by the Kinks) – handclaps

Additional musician and production

- Nicky Hopkins – Mellotron
- Brian Humphries – engineering

== Charts ==
Weekly chart performance for "Starstruck"
| Chart (1968–69) | Peak position |
|---|---|
| Netherlands (Veronica Top 40) | 13 |
| Netherlands (Hilversum 3 Top 30) | 9 |
