= She's Got Everything =

She's Got Everything may refer to:

- She's Got Everything (film), a 1937 film starring Gene Raymond and Ann Sothern
- "She's Got Everything" (song), a song by the Kinks, also covered by the Romantics
- "She's Got Everything", a song by Krokus from Hardware
- "She's Got Everything", a song by The Smugglers
