= The Kink Kronikles =

Compilation album by the Kinks
- Released: March 1972
- Recorded: 1966–1971
- Studios: Pye & Morgan, London
- Genre: Rock
- Length: 82:35
- Label: Reprise
- Producer: Ray Davies

The Kinks US chronology
Muswell Hillbillies (1971)	The Kink Kronikles (1972)	Everybody's in Show-Biz (1972)

Professional ratings
Review scores
Source	Rating
AllMusic	5/5 stars
Christgau's Record Guide	A
Rolling Stone	(favourable)

The Kink Kronikles is a compilation double album by the Kinks, released on Reprise Records in 1972, after the band had signed with RCA Records in 1971. It contains thirteen non-album singles, fourteen tracks taken from five albums released by the band from 1966 to 1971 (including the UK-only Percy), and one track previously unreleased. Designed specifically for the American market, it peaked at No. 94 on the Billboard 200. The single versions and mixes were not necessarily used for each track.

The album was reissued on red vinyl for Record Store Day in 2020.

== Content ==
After the Kinks failed to renew their American distribution contract with Reprise, the label assembled this compilation without input from the band. Instead, Reprise invited rock journalist and noted Kinks fan John Mendelsohn to compile this package, ignoring the band's early trademark hits already appearing on The Kinks Greatest Hits!. Mendelsohn also contributed the liner notes.

The album contains all five singles that charted on the Billboard Hot 100 during the time period covered, two of which appeared here on album in the US for the first time: "Dead End Street" and "Mr. Pleasant". "Lola" and "Apeman" were the band's first American top-ten hits in over five years. Five tracks made their US debut in any format here – "Berkeley Mews", "Willesden Green", "This Is Where I Belong", "Did You See His Name?" and "King Kong". "Did You See His Name?" was original to this compilation. "King Kong" would make its US single debut Reprise 1094 two months after the release of this double album. (It had been released in 1969 in the UK and other European countries.)

Considered an exemplary compilation, the album was ranked number 232 on Rolling Stone magazine's list of the 500 greatest albums of all time, one of the few compilations to appear on the list. It became an important milestone in the Kinks' career by introducing highlights of the band's England-centered 1966-1970 period to American audiences. It was never properly remastered for compact disc; the CD track listing is identical to that on the original vinyl, placing sides one and two on disc one and sides three and four on disc two. On 29 August 2020, a remastered release was issued in digital and vinyl formats. The remastering was done by Phil Kinrade at Alchemy Mastering.

== Track listing ==
All songs by Ray Davies except "Death of a Clown", "Mindless Child of Motherhood", and "Susannah's Still Alive" by Dave Davies. All catalogue numbers and titles US release except *UK or European release. **Stereo debut of single previously released in mono.

=== Side one ===
No.	Title	Source album and single catalog number	Length
1.	"Victoria"	Arthur (Or the Decline and Fall of the British Empire), Reprise 0863	3:41
2.	"The Village Green Preservation Society"	The Kinks Are the Village Green Preservation Society, Reprise 0847	2:49
3.	"Berkeley Mews **"	Non-album single: Pye 7N 17961b*	2:30
4.	"Holiday in Waikiki"	Face to Face	2:47
5.	"Willesden Green"	Percy *	2:28
6.	"This Is Where I Belong"	Non-album single: Pye 7N 17314b*	2:27
7.	"Waterloo Sunset"	Something Else by the Kinks, Reprise 0612	3:21

=== Side two ===
No.	Title	Source album and single catalog number	Length
1.	"David Watts"	Something Else, Reprise 0647b	2:29
2.	"Dead End Street"	Non-album single: Reprise 0540	3:20
3.	"Shangri-La"	Arthur	5:21
4.	"Autumn Almanac**"	Non-album single: Reprise 0647	3:16
5.	"Sunny Afternoon"	Face to Face, Reprise 0497	3:34
6.	"Get Back in Line"	Lola versus Powerman and the Moneygoround	3:08
7.	"Did You See His Name?"	previously unreleased	1:56

=== Side three ===
No.	Title	Source album and single catalog number	Length
1.	"Fancy"	Face to Face	2:30
2.	"Wonderboy"	Non-album single: Reprise 0691	2:50
3.	"Apeman"	Lola, Reprise 0979	3:57
4.	"King Kong"	Non-album single: Pye 7N 17724b*, Reprise 1094	3:27
5.	"Mr. Pleasant"	Non-album single: Reprise 0587	3:02
6.	"God's Children"	Percy, Reprise 1017	3:19
7.	"Death of a Clown"	Something Else, Reprise 0614	3:14

=== Side four ===
No.	Title	Source album and single catalog number	Length
1.	"Lola"	Lola, Reprise 0930	4:05
2.	"Mindless Child of Motherhood"	Non-album single: Reprise 0930b	3:13
3.	"Polly**"	Non-album single: Reprise 0691b	2:51
4.	"Big Black Smoke"	Non-album single: Reprise 0540b	2:37
5.	"Susannah's Still Alive**"	Non-album single: Reprise 0660	2:21
6.	"She's Got Everything**"	Non-album single: Reprise 0762b	3:08
7.	"Days**"	Non-album single: Reprise 0762	2:52
