= She's Got Everything (song) =

- B-side label of UK single

Single by the Kinks
- A-side: "Days"
- Released: 28 June 1968
- Recorded: 7 and 10 February 1966
- Studio: Pye, London
- Genre: Hard rock
- Length: 3:09
- Label: Pye (UK); Reprise (US)
- Songwriter: Ray Davies
- Producer: Ray Davies (Note: Davies is credited as the song's producer, though it was actually produced by Shel Talmy.)

The Kinks UK singles chronology
"Wonderboy" (1968)	"Days" / "She's Got Everything" (1968)	"Plastic Man" (1969)

The Kinks US singles chronology
"Wonderboy" (1968)	"Days" / "She's Got Everything" (1968)	"Starstruck" (1969)

Single mix
- "She's Got Everything" on YouTube

"She's Got Everything" is a song written by Ray Davies and released by the English rock band the Kinks. It first appeared as the B-side of the Kinks' 1968 single "Days".

The track was covered by the Romantics on their self-titled debut album.

== Background ==
"She's Got Everything" was recorded in February 1966 (with possible overdubs on the song done in 1968) during the Face to Face sessions. However, the song was not used for that album (nor its follow-up, Something Else by The Kinks), and was left unreleased. However, two years later in 1968, the Kinks were forced to rush-release another single, "Days" (originally intended to be an album track on The Kinks Are the Village Green Preservation Society), after their previous single, "Wonderboy", under-performed. "She's Got Everything" was then salvaged from their previously unreleased tracks to be used as the B-side. The track was also to be the opening track of the unreleased Four More Respected Gentlemen U.S. album.

Andy Miller states: "Ray Davies' [sic] decision to release it when and how he did is interesting. In the summer of 1968, despite having many more recent Kinks tracks to choose from, he selected a song that, even when it was recorded, must have sounded old-fashioned. The track listing for The Kinks Are the Village Green Preservation Society was still in flux, and it is clear that Davies did not want to waste any potential candidates for the finished album as b-sides."

== Lyrics and music ==
"She's Got Everything" sees the singer saying that he's "got a girl who's oh so good", saying that "she's got everything". He says that "all other guys just stand and stare" and that he "ain't got a dime but she don't care" (however, he also mentions "I don't need money 'cause I got everything that I could want"). "And I can't live without her love", he also says.

The track is sung by Ray Davies, with backing vocals from other members of the band. The song also features a guitar solo by lead guitarist Dave Davies described by Miller as "both timeless and utterly ridiculous".

"She's Got Everything" is more closely related to the Kinks' early garage rock, with its guitar driven style and simple lyrics. Miller called the track a "knowing pastiche of the sound formerly made by the group".

== Other appearances ==
"She's Got Everything" has appeared in multiple other Kinks releases aside from the "Days" single. it first appeared in album format on The Kink Kronikles, a 1972 compilation album that varied from hits to rarities. Other compilation albums the track appeared on include The Ultimate Collection and Picture Book. It also appeared as a bonus track on reissues of Face to Face. An early 1966 session version with different lyrics and a French horn appeared on the 2014 50th anniversary box set, The Anthology 1964-1971.

Although never played live by the Kinks themselves, it would go on to be a regular feature of Dave Davies' live act in the 90s and 21st century, and a live version was included on his Rock Bottom Live CD from 2000.

== Reception ==
"She's Got Everything" received mixed reviews. AllMusic's Stephen Thomas Erlewine called the track a highlight from the compilation album The Kink Kronikles. Andrew Hickey said in his book, Preservation: The Kinks' Music 1964 - 1974 that the track was "uninspired".

Drummer Mick Avory named the song as the band's most underrated, commenting, "It's difficult, really. 'She's Got Everything' was a good track."

== Personnel ==
According to band researcher Doug Hinman:

- Ray Davies – lead vocal, electric guitar
- Dave Davies – backing vocal, electric guitar
- Pete Quaife – bass
- Mick Avory – drums

Note

- In his liner notes to the 2018 Deluxe Edition of The Kinks Are the Village Green Preservation Society, archivist Andrew Sandoval instead credits drums to session musician Clem Cattini, who played on most of the band's 1965 album The Kink Kontroversy.
