= Last Night in Soho (soundtrack) =

2021 soundtrack album

Last Night in Soho is the compilation soundtrack and film score album to the 2021 psychological horror film of the same name, directed by Edgar Wright. Both the albums were released under the titles: Original Motion Picture Soundtrack and Original Motion Picture Score on 1 November 2021 under the Back Lot Music record label. The former, consists of a compilation of songs inspired from the music in the 1960s, consisting a wide range of genres, while the latter, consisted of tracks from the original score composed by Steven Price. This film marked Price's third collaboration with Wright after The World's End (2012) and Baby Driver (2017). The soundtrack and score, was later released on double vinyl, published by Mondo on 17 and 31 December 2021.

Wright collected samples from several records and cassettes from the 1960s, and had presented a few of the popular tracks to fit in the screenplay, that were later compiled into the album. Those tracks influenced several sequences in the film. The score and soundtrack received positive critical reception, and has received several awards and nominations.

== Overview ==
The music in Last Night in Soho is stuff that I feel very passionately about, and it's always a thrill to work with a song that you really love and in some cases do something interesting with it. I would be constantly cherry-picking these British mid-‘60s tracks I wanted to use that were all of a similar sort of tone and feel. I make a playlist for the film, as a way of reminding myself [...] At a certain point, the long version of the playlist was 300 songs long, and then I got it down to 50 or something like that.

— Edgar Wright

Wright stated in his interview to the Variety that "it was a real gift, soundtracking it with that period, because I wanted to focus on a certain period of ‘60s music, the mid-‘60s — like '64-5-6 — and not have so much the psychedelic later ‘60s stuff, because I felt like that had been so well covered. I thought there was something about that moment just before the Summer of Love." He connected his fascination with 1960s music to his own life. Speaking to Entertainment Weekly, Wright said "When my older brother was born, at some point my parents stopped buying records. So I was left with one decade to think about, and I would listen to [the records] obsessively," he recalls. "And then their stories about the '60s were incredibly vague, so that made me want to know more and more."

Some of the songs inspired sequences in the film. When Wright heard a cover version of "Wade In The Water" by the Graham Bond Organisation, he "would just start imagining that first dream". Cilla Black's "You're My World" with its dramatic strings conjured up "the sort of the tone and the mood". Most of the songs selected were from the 1960s. Wright also chose "Happy House" by Siouxsie and the Banshees from the 1980s, because "the production on that song is incredible" and it fits a "scene in the movie where they are at a student union Halloween dance". Discussing the choice of contemporary music, he stated: "I like songs that become famous in a different realm. Like we use "Got My Mind Set on You" the original by James Ray, which most people know as the George Harrison cover. And a lot of people know "Happy House" because the Weeknd sampled it."

A cover of the Petula Clark 1964 international hit "Downtown" was performed by lead actress Taylor-Joy. Her version was released on 22 October 2021. Joy said "It's not every day you're asked to record several versions of an iconic song. The sounds of the '60s was what first made me fall in love with music so I was overjoyed when Edgar asked me to give it a go".

"This is the first that we discussed it and it was great. We just kind of, you know, chose a tempo. … We changed the arrangement of the strings and we recorded this spooky version with all the backing vocals live in the room. Everyone playing together, really sort of a slowed down spooky version of "Downtown" which I then took away to my studio and added some of the sounds that are associated with the score. So there's mellotrons and a little bit of bass stuff and various keyboards and guitars that I played here. And then we got Anya to do another vocal on it, over in LA., and of course she was brilliant."

— Steven Price, in an interview to The Hollywood Reporter

== Reception ==
A critic from Vulture called the film "a love letter to 60's music" and added it was "Wright's soundtrack movie, even more so than Baby Driver". Collider reviewed: "What audiences can infer from these songs exactly is unclear, but if Wright's taste in music says anything, Last Night in Soho is sure to be dripping with sixties glamor — that is, before Eloise finds herself back in time and things go wildly wrong." The Times of India called it "a killer soundtrack that keeps you invested". Den Of Geek reviews stated "Last Night in Soho may well be a modern ghost story classic, but the soundtrack will always be a haunting reminder". Zanobard Reviews wrote about the film's score, saying "Steven Price's densely atmospheric score for Last Night In Soho is incredibly well made, and while at times it can be a little difficult to listen to (see the rather harsh nature of some of the full-on horror setpieces), the jazzy orchestral style and sheer ambience that grounds the album firmly in 1960s London are frankly a joy to experience, and make the score overall more than worth the price of admission. The orchestral style overall is also truly something to behold as it sounds simply gorgeous throughout, and the way it mixes and changes places with the electronics at various intervals through the score is of particular highlight." InDaily-based Penelope Debelle wrote 'Music is once again the key in Baby Driver director Edgar Wright's Last Night in Soho. This music-drenched, neon thriller takes us back to Swinging London in the '60s, reminding us of the uncomplicated pleasures of pop songs".

== Last Night in Soho (Original Motion Picture Soundtrack) ==
Last Night in Soho (Original Motion Picture Soundtrack)

Soundtrack album by various artists
- Released: 1 November 2021
- Genres: Film soundtrack; compilation; classical rock; synth pop; psychedelic; Western
- Length: 60:00
- Labels: Mondo; Back Lot Music
- Producer: Edgar Wright

=== Track listing ===
No.	Title	Artist	Length
1.	"A World Without Love"	Peter & Gordon	2:41
2.	"Wishin' and Hopin'"	Dusty Springfield	2:54
3.	"Don't Throw Your Love Away"	The Searchers	2:16
4.	"Beat Girl"	The John Barry Orchestra	1:47
5.	"Starstruck"	The Kinks	2:21
6.	"You're My World"	Cilla Black	2:59
7.	"Wade in the Water (Live at Klooks Kleek)"	The Graham Bond Organisation	2:47
8.	"Got My Mind Set on You"	James Ray	3:27
9.	"(Love Is Like a) Heat Wave"	The Who	1:58
10.	"Puppet on a String"	Sandie Shaw	2:22
11.	"Land of 1000 Dances"	The Walker Brothers	2:35
12.	"There's a Ghost in My House"	R. Dean Taylor	2:23
13.	"Happy House"	Siouxsie and the Banshees	3:50
14.	"(There's) Always Something There to Remind Me"	Sandie Shaw	2:44
15.	"Eloise"	Barry Ryan	5:45
16.	"Anyone Who Had a Heart"	Cilla Black	2:50
17.	"Last Night in Soho"	Dave Dee, Dozy, Beaky, Mick & Tich	3:17
18.	"Neon"	Steven Price	3:07
19.	"Downtown (A Capella) †"	Anya Taylor-Joy	1:19
20.	"Downtown (Uptempo) †"	Anya Taylor-Joy	3:29
21.	"You're My World †"	Anya Taylor-Joy	3:03

† original score track

=== Charts ===
Chart performance for Last Night in Soho (Original Motion Picture Soundtrack)
Chart (2021)	Peak position
UK Compilation Albums (OCC)	45
UK Soundtrack Albums (OCC)	5
US Billboard 200	87
US Soundtrack Albums (Billboard)	14

== Last Night in Soho (Original Motion Picture Score) ==
Last Night in Soho (Original Motion Picture Score)

Soundtrack album by Steven Price
- Released: 1 November 2021
- Studio: Abbey Road Studios
- Genres: Film score; ambient; synth pop; trance; experimental; psychedelic; Western; soul
- Length: 64:00
- Labels: Mondo; Back Lot Music
- Producer: Steven Price

=== Track listing ===
No.	Title	Artist	Length
1.	"Downtown (Downtempo)"	Anya Taylor-Joy	5:34
2.	"Neon"	Steven Price	5:08
3.	"The Beginning"	Steven Price	0:59
4.	"When I Feel More At Home"	Steven Price	1:11
5.	"I'm With You To The End"	Steven Price	1:41
6.	"You Look Familiar To Me"	Steven Price	1:26
7.	"You Know You're Not Asleep"	Steven Price	2:19
8.	"Handsy"	Steven Price	4:30
9.	"You Know Where To Find Me"	Steven Price	2:40
10.	"No Male Visitors"	Steven Price	3:48
11.	"Just Come In Dearie"	Steven Price	1:13
12.	"(There's) Always Something There to Remind Me"	Sandie Shaw & Steven Price	2:57
13.	"A Vision From the Past"	Steven Price	4:01
14.	"Feel Free To Run a Mile"	Steven Price	1:36
15.	"Leave Me Alone"	Steven Price	4:47
16.	"You Tell Her I Said Hello"	Steven Price	3:04
17.	"Hopes and Dreams"	Steven Price	5:29
18.	"Little Liar"	Steven Price	1:22
19.	"You're My World (Soho Version)"	Anya Taylor-Joy & Steven Price	2:18
20.	"Help"	Steven Price	2:33
21.	"You Have To Let Me Go"	Steven Price	3:45
22.	"Downtown (Soho Version)"	Anya Taylor-Joy	1:20

=== Charts ===
Chart performance for Last Night in Soho (Original Motion Picture Score)
Chart (2021)	Peak position
UK Soundtrack Albums (Official Charts)	42

== Accolades ==
Accolades received by House of Gucci
Award	Date of ceremony	Category	Recipient(s)	Result	Ref.
Detroit Film Critics Society	6 December 2021	Best Use of Music/Sound	Last Night in Soho	Won	
Hollywood Critics Association	28 February 2022	Best Score	Steven Price	Nominated	
Hollywood Music in Media Awards	17 November 2021	Best Original Score — Horror Film	Steven Price	Nominated	
Hollywood Music in Media Awards	17 November 2021	Best Original Song – Onscreen Performance	Anya Taylor-Joy – "Downtown" from Last Night in Soho; Written by Tony Hatch	Nominated	
Hollywood Music in Media Awards	17 November 2021	Soundtrack Album	Last Night in Soho	Won	
St. Louis Film Critics Association	18 December 2021	Best Score	Steven Price	Nominated	
St. Louis Film Critics Association	18 December 2021	Best Soundtrack	Last Night in Soho	Nominated	
