= Picture Book (song) =

1969 single by the Kinks

- West German picture sleeve (reverse)

Single by the Kinks

from the album The Kinks Are the Village Green Preservation Society
- A-side: "Starstruck"
- Released: January 8, 1969 (Note: The US single's release was possibly delayed a week to 15 January.)
- Recorded: May 1968
- Studio: Pye, London
- Genre: Pop
- Length: 2:32
- Label: Reprise
- Songwriter: Ray Davies
- Producer: Ray Davies

The Kinks US singles chronology
"Days" (1968)	"Starstruck" / "Picture Book" (1969)	"The Village Green Preservation Society" (1969)

Official audio
- "Picture Book" on YouTube

"Picture Book" is a song by the English rock band the Kinks from their 1968 album The Kinks Are the Village Green Preservation Society. Written and sung by Ray Davies, the song's lyrics describe the experience of an ageing narrator flipping through a photo album reflecting on happy memories from "a long time ago". Recorded in May 1968, its cheerful sound is defined by the jangle of an acoustic twelve-string guitar and a disengaged snare drum. In continental Europe, the song was issued as the B-side of the album's lead single, "Starstruck", in November 1968. The same single was issued in the United States in January 1969, though it failed to appear in any charts.

While "Picture Book" remained obscure in the decades after its release, the song has subsequently become one of the Kinks' most popular songs, due in part to its usage in a 2004 advertisement for Hewlett-Packard and Green Day featuring the riff in their 2000 single "Warning". Retrospective commentators have described the song in favourable terms and consider it one of the songs central to Village Green's concept. The song was covered by the Young Fresh Fellows in 1989.

== Background and composition ==
The Kinks' principal songwriter Ray Davies reflected in 2002 that when he wrote "Picture Book" he did not initially intend for the track to be a Kinks song given the personal content. It describes the singer's experience flipping through a photo album reflecting on happy memories. Musically, "Picture Book" is a pop song, and while its arrangement is cheerful, the lyrics do not directly describe happy memories, but instead the experience of a lonely ageing narrator looking at photographs from "a long time ago". The song features barbershop-like harmonies for a wordless vocal. Ray sings "scooby dooby doo" in reference to Frank Sinatra's 1966 single "Strangers in the Night", an improvisation Dave Davies remembered arising while the band worked on the song's harmonies and his brother Ray mocked his suggestion of a Jo Stafford-like jazz improvisation. The melody employs a four-note ascending guitar riff of E, A, D and G.

Later commentators typically compare "Picture Book" with "People Take Pictures of Each Other", another track on The Kinks Are the Village Green Preservation Society about photography. Author Thomas M. Kitts writes that "Picture Book" conveys ambiguity due to the discordance between its cheerful sound and the lyrics which instead recall "when you were just a baby, those days when you were happy, a long time ago". Kitts thinks the singer's suggestion that happiness is located in the past is a theme running throughout Village Green, and author Jon Savage considers the song one of the album's central statements, focusing around a wistful theme.

== Recording ==
Sometimes I think about songs as tracks ... The whole magic of ["Picture Book"] is that 12-string guitar and the snare drum with the snare off. It's the way Phil Spector used to work – he had his sound and wrote songs to fit that sound.

— Ray Davies, 2008

The Kinks recorded "Picture Book" in May 1968 in Pye Studio 2, one of two basement studios at Pye Records' London offices. Ray is credited as the song's producer, while Pye's in-house engineer Brian Humphries operated the four-track mixing console. The riff is played by electric, acoustic and bass guitar, and the song's distinct jangle-sound was achieved by Ray playing a twelve-string acoustic guitar. (Note: In a November 1968 interview with Bob Dawbarn of Melody Maker, Ray stated the recording featured two acoustic guitars and an overdubbed electric guitar. Hinman and journalist Chris Neal each instead write the song only features Ray on acoustic and Dave on electric guitar.) Mick Avory altered his drum sound by disengaging the snare.

Ray later said he had a defined sound in mind when he composed the song, and bassist Pete Quaife recalled the band recording multiple takes as Ray searched for his desired result. Unlike most of the album's songs, its mix emphasises the low-end, particularly Quaife's bass and Avory's drums, which critic Stewart Mason terms "cleverly sloppy".

Dave later expressed pleasure with the song's sound, commenting, "I always had a sneaking love for Picture Book' ... I love the vocal parts and the blends of my voice and Ray's. ... 'Picture Book' has a great backbeat as well and I like the guitar riff, too".

== Release and legacy ==
"Picture Book" was among the tracks Ray sent to Reprise Records in June 1968 for Four More Respected Gentlemen, a US-only album planned for late 1968, though the project was aborted before its release. While the sessions for The Kinks Are the Village Green Preservation Society persisted through the summer of 1968, the Kinks mimed a performance of "Picture Book" for the BBC Two programme Colour Me Pop on 22 July. "Picture Book" was featured on both the twelve- and fifteen-track editions of Village Green, sequenced as the third track in both cases, and Pye released the fifteen-track edition in the United Kingdom on 22 November 1968. In his preview of the album for New Musical Express magazine, critic Keith Altham described "Picture Book" as a good example of the band's ability to extract a "'tinny' texture" from a guitar sound.

Accompanying Village Green's release, "Starstruck" was issued as a single in continental Europe backed with "Picture Book" in November 1968. As the B-side, "Picture Book" did not chart, but did appear on the Ultratip bubbling under chart in Belgium's French-speaking region of Wallonia. In the lead-up to the album's American release, Reprise issued the same single in the United States, possibly on 8 January 1969, though it may have been delayed a week. The single failed to chart in the US.

I always knew that song would have its day. ... Sometimes you just know. It was never a hit, but it's become a hit in another way.

— Ray Davies reflecting on the later success of "Picture Book", 2008

The American alternative rock band the Young Fresh Fellows covered "Picture Book" on their 1989 album This One's for the Ladies, a version Stewart Mason of AllMusic calls "endearingly sloppy". "Picture Book" remained an obscure song until its use in a 2004 commercial for Hewlett-Packard advertising digital cameras and their accessories. The song subsequently became one of the Kinks' most popular songs, something journalist Andy Price thinks was furthered by the American band Green Day using its opening riff in their 2000 single "Warning". In a retrospective assessment for AllMusic, Mason wrote the song's newfound attention is well deserved since its melody is one of Ray's best from that period, and Rolling Stone critic Rob Sheffield called it "the best photo-album song of the pre-Taylor Swift era", while acknowledging the darker undertone of the lyrics. In his ranking of the songs on Village Green, Billboard critic Morgan Enos placed it first in his list.

== Personnel ==
According to band researcher Doug Hinman:

The Kinks

- Ray Davies – lead vocal, twelve-string acoustic guitar; producer
- Dave Davies – backing vocal, electric guitar
- Pete Quaife – backing vocal, bass
- Mick Avory – drums

Additional production

- Brian Humphries – engineering
