= Last of the Steam-Powered Trains =

1968 song by the Kinks

Song by the Kinks

from the album The Kinks Are the Village Green Preservation Society
- Released: 22 November 1968
- Recorded: c. 12 October 1968
- Studio: Pye, London
- Genre: Blues; R&B; rock
- Length: 4:03
- Label: Pye
- Songwriter: Ray Davies
- Producer: Ray Davies

Official audio
- "Last of the Steam-Powered Trains" on YouTube

"Last of the Steam-Powered Trains" (Note: The original release of Village Green included discrepancies between the titles listed on the album sleeve and those on the LP's central label. The song is titled "The Last of the Steam-Powered Trains" on the LP label, while the sleeve omits the first The. All subsequent reissues of the album exclude the first The.) is a song by the English rock band the Kinks from their 1968 album The Kinks Are the Village Green Preservation Society. Written and sung by Ray Davies, the song was recorded in October 1968 and was among the final tracks completed for the album. Variously described as a blues, R&B or rock number, the song describes a steam train that has outlived its usefulness and has since moved to a museum.

Recorded two months after steam trains were retired from passenger service in the UK, the song relates to Village Green's themes of preservation and the reconciling of past and present. Davies based the song's distinctive guitar-riff on the 1956 song "Smokestack Lightning" by the American blues artist Howlin' Wolf, a song the Kinks and their contemporaries regularly covered. Commentators often regard the song as Davies's criticism of early British R&B groups for being inauthentic compared to the American blues artists who wrote many of the songs they recorded. Others consider the song as relating to Davies's feelings of disconnect from contemporary culture. The song became a regular in the band's 1969 and 1970 live set list.

== Background and recording ==
From 1967 to August 1968, the Kinks recorded twelve songs for their sixth studio album, The Kinks Are the Village Green Preservation Society. Recording and mixing for the LP concluded in mid-August and the band's UK label, Pye Records, planned to issue it on 27 September 1968. Only a few weeks before the album's release, Ray Davies opted to halt production in order to expand its track listing. (Note: Release of the twelve-track LP went ahead in Sweden and Norway on 9 October 1968, with subsequent releases of that edition following in France, Italy and New Zealand.) The band reconvened at Pye around 12 October 1968 to record several new songs for the album, including "Last of the Steam-Powered Trains". Recording took place in Pye Studio 2, one of two basement studios at Pye Records's London offices. Davies is credited as the song's producer, and Pye's in-house engineer Brian Humphries operated the four-track mixing-console.

Davies composed "Last of the Steam-Powered Trains" on piano and he recorded a demo in 1968 on a reel-to-reel tape-recorder in his home's living room. His initial composition differed from the finished song in several ways, featuring a slightly different riff, a throaty vocal and a jazz-oriented sound. The finishing recording is uncharacteristically live-sounding compared to the others on Village Green; to ensure his voice cut through the loud instrumental backing, Davies changed his original throaty-vocal to a more nasally tone. Additionally, while every other track on the album runs under three minutes, "Last of the Steam-Powered Trains" is over four. After Davies created a mono reference mix, the band overdubbed a reprise, extending the song by nearly a minute. (Note: In 2018, Davies recalled: "Nowadays it would be easy [to overdub] because we've got digital technology but we ran the end of the tape and just played along with the second take and 'dropped in' over the previous recording to get the speeded-up effect.") Davies further contributed harmonica, double tracked in places so he could play both lead and rhythm parts.

== Composition ==
=== Music and lyrics ===
We were unrehearsed for the most part, and the best way to slot in my guitar with the rest of the band was to find a riff that complemented the particular tune we were playing. The riff just seemed to fit, it held the track together, although it doesn't copy "Smokestack Lightning" but is more an homage ... a nod to the style if you like.

— Ray Davies on "Last of the Steam-Powered Trains", 2018

Commentators variously describe "Last of the Steam-Powered Trains" as a blues, R&B or rock number. Davies based the song's distinctive guitar-riff on that of "Smokestack Lightning", a 1956 blues song by Howlin' Wolf. (Note: "Trains" also includes Davies imitating Wolf around 2:21, in what the biographer Andy Miller terms "a scrawny falsetto howl, more afghan hound than wolf".) In the early 1960s, "Smokestack Lightning" was commonly covered by British rhythm-and-blues groups, like the High Numbers (later the Who), the Yardbirds and Manfred Mann. (Note: Due to the song's high demand, Pye reissued it in the UK on an EP in late 1963 and then as its own single in 1964.) Davies thought the song "one of the greatest records of its type", and the Kinks regularly included it in their early live set lists before dropping it in the mid-1960s as the popularity of R&B began to diminish in the UK. (Note: In his autobiography, Davies recalled agent Hal Carter advising the group to cut the song from their set, an event Hinman dates to April 1964. In a similar incident, the Who's manager Kit Lambert said in a June 1965 interview that the band were "having serious doubts about the state of R&B" and expected to focus on "hard pop" for their first LP rather than songs like "Smokestack Lightning".)

"Smokestack Lightning" features no chord changes and instead uses a single implied tonic, but "Last of the Steam-Powered Trains" uses a progression. The musicologist Matthew Gelbart describes "Trains" as having a twenty-four-bar structure that is "proportionally correct" in comparison to a standard twelve-bar blues. (Note: Gelbart writes that the song "could in fact be considered as the usual 12 bars, with a very slow measure, but I am considering it as 24 because of the drum pattern".) Davies uses different chords at points, including replacing the usual final V–IV–I with ♭III–IV. The band biographer Johnny Rogan describes the song as an "onomatopoeic exercise", since both harmonica and guitar play together to imitate the sound of a rolling train. The song speeds up as it proceeds, and near its end the band double their tempo for two bars.

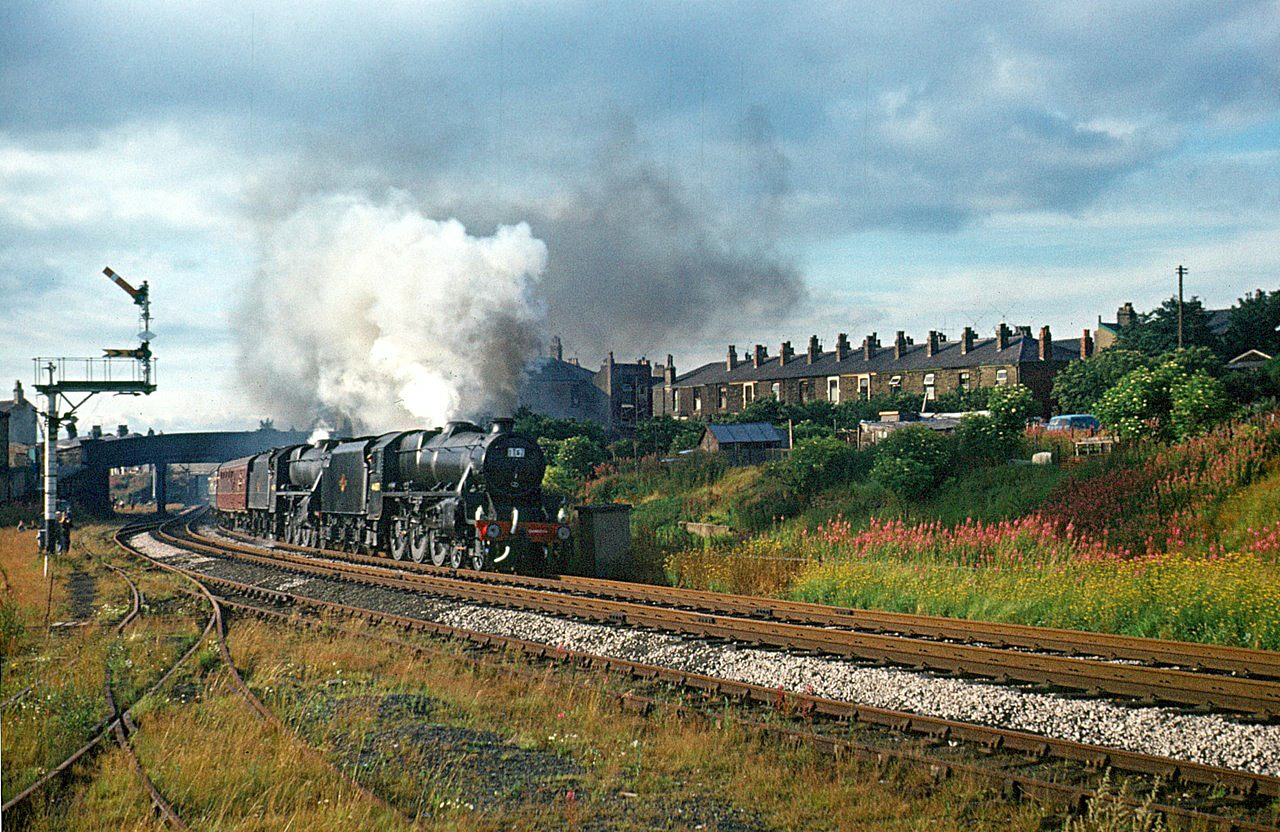
The Fifteen Guinea Special in August 1968 (pictured) marked Britain's final mainline passenger service by steam-powered locomotive.

The composition of "Last of the Steam-Powered Trains" coincided with a years-long reduction in the British railway network and the replacement of steam trains by diesel engines, a change which went into effect two months before the song's recording. Its lyrics describe a steam train that has outlived its usefulness and has since moved to a museum. Davies sings in the first person from the perspective of the train that he is the last renegade, while all of his friends are now grey-haired and middle class. He sarcastically sings that living in a museum means he is "okay", adding that "all this peaceful living is driving me insane".

=== Interpretation ===
Commentators often regard the song as Davies's criticism of early British R&B groups for being inauthentic compared to the American blues artists who wrote many of the songs they recorded. The English professor Barry J. Faulk thinks the song fits on Village Green by relating to the album's theme of "willful obsolescence", writing that by recalling the band's earlier R&B styling, the song serves to remind listeners that music can come to quickly sound dated. He adds that the lyrics are a celebration on Davies's part of "his own version of the fetishized past", while "the music suggests the ease with which the musical past can become a fetish". Rogan considers the song "a farewell to the past", but also relevant to the blues revival taking place in both the UK and US in 1968.

The academic Raphael Costambeys-Kempczynski considers the song one of Village Green's various character studies. Miller writes that like other songs on the album, the song centres thematically around the notion of preservation and questions how one can reconcile both the past and present. He writes that like the character in the song "Johnny Thunder", the train has avoided succumbing to middle-class values like his friends but at the cost of living forever in a museum. The musicologist Allan F. Moore thinks the song is about the loneliness of its subject, who feels out of step with the current times. The band biographers Rob Jovanovic and Jon Savage each offer the same interpretation, but specify that the subject is either the Kinks or Davies, respectively. In a 1968 interview, Davies compared the song to "Do You Remember Walter?", explaining that both were "about not having anything in common with people", adding: "It's about me being the last of the renegades. All my friends are middle-class now. They've all stopped playing in clubs. They've all made money and have happy faces.

== Release and reception ==
Pye released The Kinks Are the Village Green Preservation Society in the UK on 22 November 1968. "Last of the Steam-Powered Trains" appears on side one, between "Johnny Thunder" and "Big Sky". In their promotion of the album, on 7 January 1969, the Kinks played the song along with "Picture Book" for the BBC2 programme Once More with Felix, which was later broadcast on 1 February 1969. When the band held their first American tour in over four years in late 1969, the song became a regular in their live set and was sometimes played as the opening number. The song featured in concerts in 1969 and 1970, often played as an extended jam. (Note: Miller disparages several live recordings of the song from the 1969 and 1970 tours, writing that its "ironies and nuances have all been ditched in favour of some fully-fledged and unfortunate [Led Zeppelin]-like noodling". Writing about the same recordings, Kitts instead considers the versions "very competent extended jams".)

Among contemporary reviewers, Robert Christgau of The Village Voice declared "Last of the Steam-Powered Trains" the most-memorable track on Village Green and wrote that like many others songs on the album, it is about "how to deal with the past". Placing the song in the context of the rock-and-roll revival, he wrote it could have been the album's lead single had there been enough demand. In Paul Williams review of the album for Rolling Stone, he wrote that it made him smile to know the Kinks finally recorded "Smokestack Lightning", "and [they did] a good job of it too". He continues: "A little fancy kineticism in the break, harmonica and bass and lead buildup, just so you know all the old tricks are as relevant to their music as any new tricks they might enjoy could be."

In a retrospective assessment, Morgan Enos of Billboard magazine describes the song as an "inspired goof", being a parody of bands like Them and the Yardbirds. Among band biographers, Clinton Heylin considers it one of the better songs on Village Green while also finding it disruptive to the album's conceptual cohesiveness. By contrast, Thomas M. Kitts writes that the song "now seems indispensable" to the album's concept. Rogan describes the song as one of the album's "great surprises" and considers it one of the band's best R&B numbers, and Christian Matijas-Mecca writes the song's expression of nostalgia anticipated the blues rock heard in the decade which followed.
