= Mister Pleasant =

- West German picture sleeve

Single by the Kinks
- A-side: "Autumn Almanac" (UK)
- B-side: "Harry Rag" (US); "This Is Where I Belong" (Europe)
- Released: 21 April 1967
- Recorded: February 1967
- Studio: Pye, London
- Genre: Rock, music hall
- Label: Pye (UK and Europe); Reprise (US)
- Songwriter: Ray Davies
- Producer: Shel Talmy

The Kinks UK singles chronology
"Waterloo Sunset" (1967)	"Autumn Almanac" / "Mr. Pleasant" (1967)	"Wonderboy" (1968)

The Kinks US singles chronology
"Dead End Street" (1966)	"Mr. Pleasant" (1967)	"Waterloo Sunset" (1967)

"Mister Pleasant" (sometimes written as "Mr. Pleasant") is a song recorded by British rock group the Kinks in 1967, written by Ray Davies.

== Background ==
"Mister Pleasant" is lyrically somewhat similar to the earlier track "A Well Respected Man", as it satirises the heedless complacency of a nouveau riche who, for all his newfound worldly success, is but a foolish cuckold. Musically, the song has strong English Music Hall influences and a "trad jazz" backing that features a trombone and ragtime-style piano (played by Nicky Hopkins).

Billboard described the single as "clever novelty material penned by Ray Davies with an easy dance beat in strong support".

== Chart performance ==
It was released as the A-side of a single in the USA and mainland Europe but not in the UK. It was released in the UK six months later as the B-side of "Autumn Almanac". The song is now available as a bonus track with the group's album Face to Face, and an alternate version was also released as a bonus track on the 2011 deluxe reissue of Something Else by the Kinks. Due to the Kinks' absence from American touring and the single's offbeat sound, "Mister Pleasant" did not fare well in the USA, only managing a peak of number 80—their poorest showing since "See My Friends" failed to reach the Hot 100 in 1965—despite being tapped as likely Top 20 material by Billboard magazine. The publication characterized it as a "clever novelty" piece, which "should skyrocket the group back up to the top of Hot 100 once again". "Mr. Pleasant" was much more successful in Europe, particularly the Netherlands (where it reached number 2) and Belgium (number 3).

While the Kinks mimed "Mister Pleasant" on the European TV shows Fan Club and Beat Club in 1967 to promote the single, as well as recording it for the BBC in the same year, only one occasion has been documented when it was played live in concert by the group: at a New York concert on 27 March 1971.

== B-sides ==
While the USA B-side "Harry Rag" was included on the upcoming Something Else by The Kinks album (released in September), the European B-side "This is Where I Belong" remained unavailable in the UK or USA. The track had been recorded in the sessions for Face to Face but not included (although it is currently available on the CD reissue, along with "Mister Pleasant"). It was made available in the USA on The Kink Kronikles in 1972, but was only released in the UK in 1984.

== French EP ==
Given that EPs with four tracks were much more common in France than two-track singles, most Kinks singles were issued there in EP format. Usually two album tracks would be added to the A- and B-sides; however, in the case of "Mister Pleasant" all the tracks were exclusive. As well as both sides of the European single (see above), the EP contained "Two Sisters" from the as-yet-unreleased Something Else by... and the debut of "Village Green", which only became available in the UK 18 months later on the album The Kinks Are the Village Green Preservation Society.

=== Track listing ===
All tracks written by Ray Davies.

==== Side one ====
1. "Mister Pleasant" – 3:00
2. "This is Where I Belong" – 2:28

==== Side two ====
1. "Two Sisters" – 2:00
2. "Village Green" – 2:08

== Personnel ==
According to band researcher Doug Hinman:

The Kinks

- Ray Davies – lead vocal, acoustic guitar
- Dave Davies – backing vocal, electric guitar
- Pete Quaife – backing vocal, bass
- Mick Avory – drums

Additional musicians

- John Beecham or an unidentified session musician – trombone
- Rasa Davies – backing vocal
- Nicky Hopkins – piano

== Charts ==
Chart (1967)	Peak position
Australia (Go-Set)	30
Australia (Kent Music Report)	35
Belgium (Ultratop 50 Flanders)	4
Belgium (Ultratop 50 Wallonia)	12
Canada Top Singles (RPM)	79
Denmark (Danmarks Radio)	3
Germany (GfK)	12
Malaysia (Radio Malaysia)	9
Netherlands (Dutch Top 40)	2
Netherlands (Single Top 100)	2
Singapore (Radio Singapore)	3
US Billboard Hot 100	80
US Cash Box Top 100	64

== Other versions ==
- The Mission covered the song on their 1990 album Grains of Sand.
