= Autumn Almanac =

- French picture sleeve

Single by the Kinks
- B-side: "Mister Pleasant" (UK); "David Watts" (US & Europe)
- Released: 13 October 1967
- Recorded: September 1967
- Studio: Pye, London
- Genre: Pop
- Length: 3:05
- Label: Pye (UK); Reprise (US)
- Songwriter: Ray Davies
- Producer: Ray Davies

The Kinks singles chronology
"Waterloo Sunset" (1967)	"Autumn Almanac" (1967)	"Wonderboy" (1968)

"Autumn Almanac" is a song written by Ray Davies and recorded by the rock group the Kinks in 1967. "Autumn Almanac" has since been noted for being an "absolute classic", "a finely observed slice of English custom", and a "weird character study", and praised for its "mellow, melodic sound that was to characterize the Kinks' next [musical] phase..." Some have placed this and other Davies compositions in the pastoral-Romantic tradition of the poetry of Wordsworth, among others.

In his 1995 autobiography X-Ray and in subsequent performances of his VH1 Storytellers effort, Davies described the song as being inspired by a local hunch-backed gardener in his native Muswell Hill neighbourhood of North London.

"Autumn Almanac" was a non-album single in between 1967's Something Else by the Kinks and 1968's The Kinks Are the Village Green Preservation Society. The song was a big success in the UK, reaching No. 3 on the singles chart, but not in the US, where it failed to chart on the Billboard Hot 100. Like many recordings of the mid-to-late 1960s, "Autumn Almanac" was released in both mono and stereo versions. The mono version was released as a single and appears as a bonus track on the 1998 CD reissue of Something Else by The Kinks as well as most compilations. The stereo version, which is ten seconds longer and features more psychedelic audio effects such as a tape loop during the fadeout, appears on the 1972 compilation The Kink Kronikles as well as the deluxe 2-CD reissue of Something Else.

Kink's guitarist Dave Davies spoke highly of "Autumn Almanac" in an interview with Yahoo! in 2015, saying, "I was playing through 'Autumn Almanac' [recently] and it’s a phenomenal recording. You can understand why it has lasted so long."

English singer-songwriter Damon Albarn named the song as likely his favorite Kinks song in a 1995 interview, stating, "I think 'Dead End Street' and 'Autumn Almanac' are my favourites. Primarily because there are so many bits to them and they’re so graphic. I could pick at least 20, but off the top of my head those are my favourites. 'Autumn Almanac' is probably my favourite."

== Personnel ==
According to band researcher Doug Hinman:

The Kinks

- Ray Davies – lead vocal, acoustic guitar
- Dave Davies – backing vocal, electric guitar
- Pete Quaife – backing vocal, bass
- Mick Avory – drums

Additional musicians

- Rasa Davies – backing vocals
- Nicky Hopkins – piano, (Note: Hinman writes piano and Mellotron may have been instead been played by Ray Davies.) Mellotron
