= Berkeley Mews =

- B-side label of UK single

Single by the Kinks
- A-side: "Lola"
- Released: 12 June 1970
- Recorded: Early 1968 (Note: Doug Hinman provides a range of January–March 1968. Andy Miller hypothesises that additional overdubs may have taken place in May or June 1969.)
- Studio: Pye, London
- Genre: Novelty song
- Length: 2:25
- Label: Pye
- Songwriter: Ray Davies
- Producer: Ray Davies

The Kinks UK singles chronology
"Victoria" (1969)	"Lola" / "Berkeley Mews" (1970)	"Apeman" (1970)

Single mix
- "Berkeley Mews" on YouTube

"Berkeley Mews" is a song by the English rock band the Kinks. It was released on a non-album single in June 1970, as the B-side to "Lola". Written and sung by bandleader Ray Davies, the song was recorded in early 1968 during the sessions for The Kinks Are the Village Green Preservation Society (1968). The title references a small street in London, while the lyrics recount a one-night stand. Influenced by the music of the 1940s, the song employs a heavier production than was typical for the band's 1968 work.

== Background and recording ==
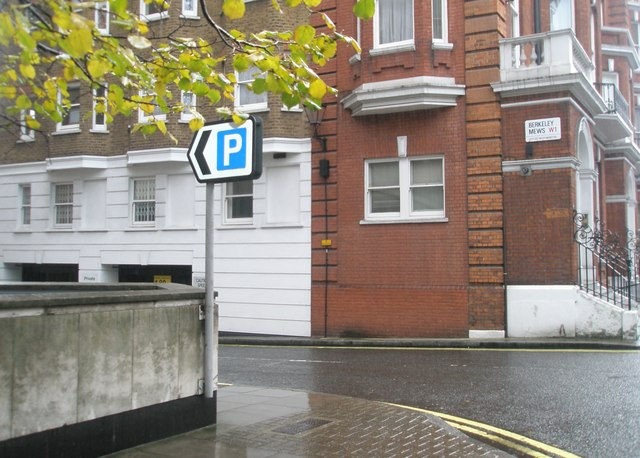
Berkeley Mews, a small street in London (pictured 2008)

Ray Davies composed "Berkeley Mews" in reference to a street of the same name in London, located near Pye Records's offices at Marble Arch. The lyrics recount a drunken one-night stand. The music is influenced by that of the 1940s, and historian Carey Fleiner writes the song evokes the decade's "hard life and grim economy". Band biographer Johnny Rogan characterises the song as a "playful novelty number". He describes its arrangement as "chaotic", joining both a pub-styled piano with drunken-sounding vocals.

The Kinks recorded "Berkeley Mews" from around January to March 1968 during the sessions for The Kinks Are the Village Green Preservation Society. (Note: In Doug Hinman and Jason Brabazon's 1994 self-published Kinks discography, they date the recording to late 1967 or early 1968. Later authors like Miller (2003) cite Hinman & Brabazon's book to provide the same dating. In his 2004 book, Hinman updated his dating to a range of January–March 1968.) Recording took place in Pye Studio 2, one of two basement studios at Pye's London offices. Ray is credited as the song's producer, while Pye's in-house engineers Alan MacKenzie operated the four-track mixing console. Session keyboardist Nicky Hopkins – a regular on Kinks recordings since 1965 – played piano. Additional contributions included Mellotron, handclaps and a saxophone.

== Release ==
"Berkeley Mews" remained unreleased to the public for roughly two-and-a-half years. An acetate disc from around March 1968 paired the song with "Rosemary Rose" for a potential single, though it was not issued. "Berkeley Mews" had little in common with the themes of The Kinks Are the Village Green Preservation Society, and Ray opted to not release it on that album. When the Kinks' US recording contract required them to submit a new album to Reprise Records in June 1968, it was among the fifteen tracks he sent to the label. The song featured on the label's test pressings of the album, which was planned for a late 1968 release in the US as Four More Respected Gentlemen, though the project was abandoned.

"Berkeley Mews" was first released in July 1969 on the US promotional compilation album Then Now and Inbetween. The album was issued to journalists, radio program directors and disc jockeys as part of the "God Save the Kinks" promotional campaign, which sought to reestablish the band's status in the US after their four-year performance ban. Band biographer Andy Miller hypothesises that the Kinks may have overdubbed additional parts for the song in anticipation of the song's inclusion on the compilation album. He focuses on elements which were generally absent from the band's 1968 work, such as the heavier guitar production and the presence of a saxophone. He suggests the saxophone may have been overdubbed around May or June 1969 during the sessions for Arthur (1969), since Dave Davies's song "Mr. Reporter" received a brass overdub around the same time.

And then along came "Lola". [When I turned the single over,] I thought, is that me? Wait a minute – it is me!

— Pete Quaife on his surprise at hearing "Berkeley Mews" in 1970, c. 2002–03

Pye released "Berkeley Mews" in the UK as the B-side to "Lola" on 12 June 1970. Decades later, bassist Pete Quaife – who left the Kinks in March 1969 – reflected on his surprise at hearing his own bass playing on the B-side. In the US, Reprise replaced "Berkeley Mews" with a different B-side; the label did not issue the song in the US until 25 March 1972 on the compilation album The Kink Kronikles. The song was also included as a bonus track on the 2004 CD reissue of Village Green and on the 2014 box set The Kinks – The Anthology 1964–1971.

== Personnel ==
According to band researcher Doug Hinman, except where noted:

The Kinks

- Ray Davies – lead vocal, Mellotron (Note: Miller does not specify whether Ray or Hopkins contributed Mellotron.)
- Dave Davies – electric guitar
- Pete Quaife – bass
- Mick Avory – drums
- Unidentified (played by the Kinks) – handclaps

Additional musicians

- Nicky Hopkins – piano, Mellotron
- Unidentified session musician – saxophone
