= Big Black Smoke =

Single by the Kinks
- A-side: "Dead End Street"
- Released: 18 November 1966
- Recorded: 21–22 October 1966
- Studio: Pye, London
- Genre: Rock
- Label: Pye (UK, 7N 17222); Reprise (US, 0540)
- Songwriter: Ray Davies
- Producer: Shel Talmy

The Kinks UK singles chronology
"Sunny Afternoon" (1966)	"Dead End Street" / "Big Black Smoke" (1966)	"Waterloo Sunset" (1967)

The Kinks US singles chronology
"Sunny Afternoon" (1966)	"Dead End Street" / "Big Black Smoke" (1966)	"Mister Pleasant" (1967)

"Big Black Smoke" is the B-side to the Kinks' single "Dead End Street", written by Ray Davies. The song was not originally included on any album, but has since appeared as a track on the popular 1972 Kink Kronikles compilation and as a bonus track on the CD reissue of Face to Face.

The Big Smoke is a euphemism for London, the setting of the story told in the lyric.

The song makes reference to the recreational use of the drug Drinamyl with the lyric "And every penny she had was spent on purple hearts and cigarettes."

== Personnel ==
According to band researcher Doug Hinman:

The Kinks

- Ray Davies – lead vocals, acoustic guitar
- Dave Davies – backing vocals, electric guitar
- John Dalton (Note: After Pete Quaife was injured in a 3 June 1966 car accident, Dalton served as a temporary replacement. Dalton replaced Quaife as the Kinks' full-time bassist on 12 September 1966, making "Big Black Smoke" among Dalton's first recordings as an official member of the group. Quaife returned to the band on 14 November 1966, replacing Dalton.) – backing vocals, bass
- Mick Avory – drums

== Legacy ==
The bell sound effects heard at the beginning of the song would go on to be used in the song "Fat Old Sun" from 1970's Atom Heart Mother by Pink Floyd, and would later be used again later in the song High Hopes from 1994's The Division Bell
