= Wonderboy (The Kinks song) =

- Norwegian picture sleeve

Single by the Kinks
- B-side: "Polly"
- Released: 5 April 1968
- Recorded: March 1968
- Studio: Pye, London
- Genre: Pop
- Label: Pye (UK); Reprise (US)
- Songwriter: Ray Davies
- Producer: Ray Davies

The Kinks singles chronology
| "Autumn Almanac" (1967) | "Wonderboy" (1968) | "Days" (1968) |

Official audio
- "Wonderboy" on YouTube

"Wonderboy" (sometimes spelled "Wonder Boy") is a song by the English rock band the Kinks, written by Ray Davies. It was released as a non-album single in April 1968. It stalled at number 36 in the UK charts, becoming the band's first single not to make the UK Top Twenty since their early covers.

It peaked at number six in the Netherlands. It also reached number fifteen on the Tio i Topp chart in Sweden. "Wonderboy" was also released as a single in the US but failed to chart. It was one of several US non-LP singles tracks that made its album debut on the US-only released compilation The Kink Kronikles.

The single made its first time stereo appearance on the Golden Hour budget series "Golden Hour Of The Kinks", with Ray's lead vocal buried in the mix. The few subsequent reissues of the stereo mix (on the 3-CD The Kinks Are the Village Green Preservation Society set) continues to use this unusual mix.

== Background and recording ==
Ray Davies composed "Wonderboy" over a single night in March 1968, during which he later recalled drinking an entire bottle of vodka. The song's composition coincided with his and his wife Rasa's attempts at conceiving a second child, which Ray hoped would be a boy. (Note: The couple's second daughter was born nine months later in December 1968.) He commented, "I was expecting my second daughter, Victoria, and in that song is all the layers, the cathartic feelings, the problems, the images, my thoughts on my position in the world, why I should be a parent... I called it 'Wonderboy' because I didn't know it would be a girl."

The Kinks recorded "Wonderboy" in March 1968 during the sessions for their 1968 album The Kinks Are the Village Green Preservation Society. Recording took place in Pye Studio 2, one of two basement studios at Pye Records' London offices. Ray produced the song, while one of Pye's in-house engineer operated the four-track mixing console, likely Brian Humphires. Supplementing the Kinks' regular line-up was Rasa, who contributed backing vocals; the band's regular session keyboardist Nicky Hopkins, who played piano; and the band's road manager Ken Jones, who played bongos.

== Release and reception ==
In the last week of March 1968, Ray selected "Wonderboy" from the Kinks' backlog of recorded material to be the band's next single. (Note: Other candidates considered for the single appear on surviving acetate discs. Pairings included "Animal Farm" and "Did You See His Name" as well as "Rosemary Rose" and "Berkeley Mews".) Pye rush released the single in the UK on 5 April 1968 with "Polly" as its B-side. Prominent advertisements in all British weekly magazines accompanied the release, but the song was the band's worst performing British single since "You Still Want Me" in early 1964. The single's highest British chart appearance was in New Musical Express, where it appeared for one week at No. 28. It reached No. 36 on Record Retailer's chart, and it did not appear on Melody Maker's chart. The failure ended the band's streak of twelve consecutive top 20 hits, the last five of which had made it to the top five. The single sold 26,000 copies, roughly one-ninth of each of the band's two UK singles from the previous year, "Waterloo Sunset" and "Autumn Almanac". (Note: To make up for the comparably poor sales of "Wonderboy", Pye rush-released two EPs in the UK on 19 April 1968 – Dave Davies Hits and The Kinks – both of which were mostly made up of material from the band's 1967 album Something Else by the Kinks.)

"Wonderboy" was well received by British music critics. A reviewer in Record Mirror magazine wrote that the Kinks had managed to "come up with something which is so darned catchy that one cannot help humming along with it". The writer characterised the song as "[p]hilosophy-pop" and resolved that it was not the Kinks' best work, but only because of the band's high standards. Derek Johnson of New Musical Express called it a "charming philosophic song", displaying Ray's "incredible flair for writing lyrics of a beautifully descriptive nature". Johnson concluded that the song was more commercial than either "Waterloo Sunset" or "Autumn Almanac" and predicted it would be a big hit, as did Melody Maker's reviewer.

Reprise Records issued "Wonderboy" in the US on 15 or 22 May 1968. The single was advertised on part of a full-page ad in Billboard magazine and was reviewed in its Special Merit category, indicating that the magazine did not expect it to reach the top 60. Billboard's critic characterised the song as an "infectious rocker loaded with teen appeal", leading Doug Hinman, a Kinks researcher, to suspect that the reviewer had not actually listened to the record. While the Kinks' singles had sold well in the US up to 1966, their 1967 singles "Mister Pleasant" and "Waterloo Sunset" were commercial disappointments. By the time "Autumn Almanac" was released in late 1967, American record stores had generally stopped stocking the band's singles. As a result, "Wonderboy" did not chart in the US and received little airplay.

== Legacy ==
Though the song was a minor commercial disappointment, it became a favourite of John Lennon of the Beatles, and, according to Ray Davies in his autobiography, X-Ray, "someone had seen John Lennon in a club and he kept on asking the disc jockey to play 'Wonder Boy' [sic] over and over again." Kinks guitarist Dave Davies praised the song, saying, "'Wonderboy' was a big one for us although it wasn't a hit. That was one song we really felt something for." Ray Davies reflected, "It wasn't a great hit but that doesn't matter. That work is out there. Writing songs is like running a marathon; the important part is finishing." However, bassist Peter Quaife's opinion towards the track was low, later stating that "[I] hated it ... it was horrible."

== Charts ==
Weekly chart performance for "Wonderboy"
| Chart (1968) | Peak position |
|---|---|
| Denmark (Danmarks Radio) | 20 |
| Netherlands (Veronica Top 40) | 6 |
| Netherlands (Hilversum 3 Top 30) | 4 |
| Sweden (Tio i Topp) | 6 |
| UK (New Musical Express) | 28 |
| UK (Record Retailer) | 36 |
| West Germany (Musikmarkt) | 29 |

== Personnel ==
According to band researcher Doug Hinman:

The Kinks

- Ray Davies – lead vocal, guitar
- Dave Davies – backing vocal, electric guitar
- Pete Quaife – backing vocal, bass
- Mick Avory – drums

Additional musicians

- Rasa Davies – backing vocal
- Nicky Hopkins – piano
- Ken Jones – bongos
