= X-Ray (book) =

1994 book by Ray Davies

X-Ray: The Unauthorized Autobiography
- First US edition
- Author: Ray Davies
- Genre: Memoir
- Publisher: Penguin/Viking (UK); Overlook Press (US)
- Publication date: 12 September 1994 (UK); 25 September 1995 (US)
- Pages: 420 pp
- ISBN: 0-87951-611-9 (1st edition, hardcover)

X-Ray (1994) was Ray Davies' first major attempt to write prose outside his musical career as founding member of the British rock band the Kinks. Robert Polito calls it an "experimental non-fiction" and describes Davies as "a prose stylist of Nabokovian ambition".

== X-Ray ==
The book, subtitled as an "unauthorized autobiography", employs a nameless 19-year-old first-person narrator hired by 'the Corporation' to seek out and interview a slightly demented geriatric version of Davies himself ten to twenty years after the time of the novel's publication. Thus, while technically an autobiography, the work has an unreliable narrator. In many ways a work of fiction, it reveals many factual details concerning the Kinks and other important figures of the Swinging Sixties, but tends to do so in a literary fashion. By employing this narrative device, Davies was able to shed some light on the life of the Kinks without resorting to the usual pedestrian 'he said/she said' mechanics often associated with memoirs of celebrities.

== Basic storyline ==
The young narrator interviews the demented Davies, with the bulk of the story focusing on Davies' early apparent success juxtaposed against his feelings of failure and isolation as he finds himself married worrying about how he's going to make ends meet while the band's management and record company hoarded all of the profits from the Kinks' early successes. He also juxtaposes his life as a young married rock musician against that of his brother Dave Davies who was living the wild life of a hipster during that period.

In addition to themes of isolation and spiritual longing, the book gives a great deal of insight into the Kinks' disintegrating relationship with Pye Records which ended around 1971 and resulted in the album: Lola versus Powerman and the Moneygoround (which is quite critical of Pye and mirrors many of the themes found in the book). The text also addresses, but ultimately does not really explain, the notorious episode in which the Kinks were banned from performing music in the United States for a period of approximately four years after a 1965 tour.

Within the book the reader "experiences" the viewpoint of the young narrator who at times merges with the character of Ray Davies. One receives insights into Davies' impressions of other famous musicians of the British Invasion. John Lennon, in particular, is portrayed as a bit of a bully.

The story narrated in the text ends in 1973 on the eve of the recording of Preservation, so readers interested in such things as Davies' relationship with Chrissie Hynde or his current career as a solo singer-songwriter will have to look elsewhere.
