= Dead End Street (song) =

- West German picture sleeve

Single by the Kinks
- B-side: "Big Black Smoke"
- Released: 18 November 1966
- Recorded: 21 October 1966
- Studio: Pye, London
- Genre: Pop; music hall
- Length: 3:20
- Label: Pye (UK); Reprise (US)
- Songwriter: Ray Davies
- Producer: Shel Talmy

The Kinks UK singles chronology
"Sunny Afternoon" (1966)	"Dead End Street" (1966)	"Waterloo Sunset" (1967)

The Kinks US singles chronology
"Sunny Afternoon" (1966)	"Dead End Street" (1966)	"Mister Pleasant" (1967)

"Dead End Street" is a song by the British band the Kinks from 1966, written by main songwriter Ray Davies. Like many other songs written by Davies, it is to some degree influenced by British Music Hall. The bass playing was partly inspired by the "twangy" sound of Duane Eddy's guitar. It was originally released as a non-album single, but has since been included as one of several bonus tracks from the Face to Face CD. The song, like many others by the group, deals with the poverty and misery found in the lower classes of English society.

== Background ==
According to Ray Davies, the lyrics are about a couple that want to emigrate to Australia under the Assisted Passage Migration Scheme but when that fell through they could not get a job.

Describing the song in his 1996 autobiography, Kink, Dave Davies said: "'Dead End Street' was the epitome, to me, of what the Kinks were all about. A song full of character, pathos, yet containing an underlying sense of hope. Reflecting a fondness for the past but at the same time expressing a determination and yearning for change. Anguished voices calling to a heartless world. A world where the plight of the ordinary person mattered little. It was interesting to note that more than ten years later, the Clash did a song called 'London Calling' that seemed to be inspired by 'Dead End Street'."

Ray Davies said of the song: "It was written very quickly and it was written for the winter. It was that thing of living in England and having had a great summer and now the light was closing in and the mood just shifts. The music had that little jazz backbeat, but there were these dark edges. I thought I was writing a trad jazz vamp about hard times that were coming. My father had lived through the depression and he had talked about it, so the song had that 20s/30s feel to it – those stomping chords, the march of destiny coming to grab you. It was a very visual backdrop to the song."

The band recorded two versions of the song. The first, recorded with their usual producer Shel Talmy, used an organ and a French horn. Considering this version to have "no warmth in it at all", the band recorded the final version after Talmy left for the day, replacing the organ with a piano and the French horn with a trombone. The song incorporates two bass guitar parts.

== Reception ==
Upon release, the song was praised by Melody Maker who opined "It is the strength of the lyrics allied to a nostalglc, 1920s touch about the melody which confirms Ray Davies' position as one of the most influential pop composers of the 1960s." Billboard described "Dead End Street" as an "exceptional off-beat item" with a "driving dance beat" that it expected to be a "surefire smash". Cash Box said that the "drawn out melodies are terribly infectious and the gutsy vocal should be appealing to fans of many persuasions". The song was a big success in the UK, reaching No. 5 on the singles charts, but only reached No. 73 in the United States. In 1976 it ranked No. 72 on New Musical Express's list of the Top 100 Singles of All Time. Some labels list the song as "Deadend Street".

== Promotional film ==
A mimed promotional film (precursor to the modern music video) was produced for the song in late 1966. It was filmed on Little Green Street, a diminutive eighteenth century lane in North London, located off Highgate Road in Kentish Town.

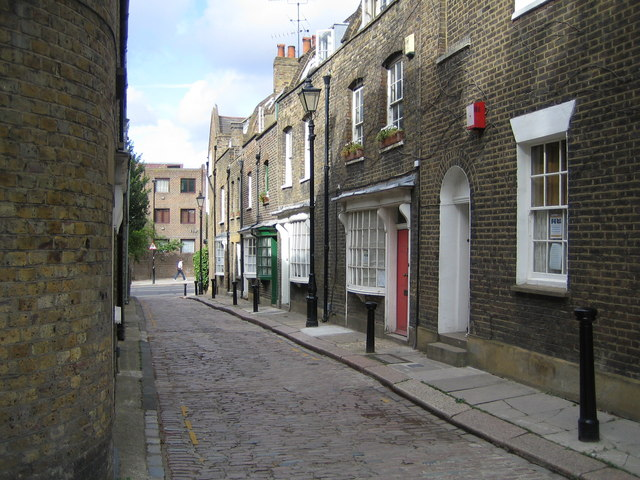
Little Green Street, location of the "Dead End Street" promotional film

The film was shot in black and white, and featured each member of the band dressed as an undertaker, as well as playing various other characters. It runs roughly 3 minutes and 15 seconds. Dave Davies says that the BBC disliked the film, with the group dressed as Victorian pallbearers and one of their roadies in a nightshirt suddenly leaping out of the coffin as they put it down on the pavement, claiming it was in bad taste.

The song was recorded at a time when bassist Pete Quaife had left the band after a scooter accident, and was replaced by John Dalton. Quaife had returned to the group by the time the promotional film was shot.

== Personnel ==
According to band researcher Doug Hinman:

The Kinks

- Ray Davies – lead vocal, piano
- Dave Davies – backing vocal, acoustic guitar, bass
- John Dalton (Note: After Pete Quaife was injured in a 3 June 1966 car accident, Dalton served as a temporary replacement. Dalton replaced Quaife as the Kinks' full-time bassist on 12 September 1966, making "Dead End Street" Dalton's first recording as an official member of the group. Quaife returned to the band on 14 November 1966, replacing Dalton.) – backing vocal, bass
- Mick Avory – drums

Additional musicians

- Stan Whitley – backing vocal
- John Matthews – trombone

== Charts ==
Chart (1966–67)	Peak position
Australia (Kent Music Report)	62
Belgium (Ultratop 50 Flanders)	11
Belgium (Ultratop 50 Wallonia)	15
Canada Top Singles (RPM)	28
Canada (CHUM)	7
Denmark (Danmarks Radio)	9
Finland (Suomen virallinen lista)	23
France (IFOP)	28
Germany (GfK)	5
Ireland (IRMA)	7
Netherlands (Dutch Top 40)	5
Netherlands (Single Top 100)	4
New Zealand (Listener)	4
Norway (VG-lista)	6
Sweden (Kvällstoppen)	12
Sweden (Tio i Topp)	4
UK Singles (Official Charts)	5
US Billboard Hot 100	73
US Cash Box Top 100	72

== Covers and alternative versions ==
"Dead End Street" has been covered by the Jam. The song and its music video influenced Oasis's No. 1 hit "The Importance of Being Idle" from 2005. An unreleased alternative recording of the song from October 1966 was issued in December 2008 on the Kinks 6-CD box set Picture Book. In 2010, Davies also recorded this as a duet with Amy Macdonald on the album See My Friends.
