= Days (The Kinks song) =

1968 single by the Kinks

- Italian picture sleeve

Single by the Kinks
- B-side: "She's Got Everything"
- Released: 28 June 1968
- Recorded: 27 May – June 1968
- Studio: Pye, London
- Genre: Pop
- Length: 2:50
- Label: Pye (UK); Reprise (US)
- Songwriter: Ray Davies
- Producer: Ray Davies

The Kinks UK singles chronology
"Wonderboy" (1968)	"Days" (1968)	"Plastic Man" (1969)

The Kinks US singles chronology
"Wonderboy" (1968)	"Days" (1968)	"Starstruck" (1969)

Mono single mix
- "Days" on YouTube

"Days" is a song by the English rock band the Kinks, written by Ray Davies. It was released as a non-album single in June 1968. It also appeared on an early version of the album The Kinks Are the Village Green Preservation Society (released only in continental Europe and New Zealand). It now appears as a bonus track of the remastered CD. On the original Pye 7N 17573 label (and on related European releases), the name of the song is printed as "Day's" owing to a grammatical error.

== Background ==
In a 2018 interview, Ray Davies claimed that the song was inspired by his sister Rosie moving to Australia, a topic that inspired other Kinks works such as 1966's "Rosy Won't You Please Come Home" and 1969's Arthur. He explained, "My sister Rosie had gone to Australia, and we didn't have communication — no Internet in those days. She left and said, 'Say goodbye, my loving brother,' and I said, 'Thank you for being my sister.' So the song's for her, really, and her generation."

Alternatively, Davies attributed the song's "air of finality" to the Kinks' turmoil at the time, even noting that, at the time the band made the song, he felt it might be their last single. He recollected, "Pop musicians aren't meant to go on forever. And around this time, whenever I finished a session, I thought maybe this is the last record I'd ever make. That's why it has this strange emotion to it. Fortunately though the Kinks went on to make other records."

Lyrically, the song is a melancholic reflection on someone meaningful who is departing. Ray commented, "It's a goodbye song, but it’s also an inspirational song. It could also mean a new beginning. I wanted to write a sad song with an optimistic praise to it." Davies later named it as one of the songs he would like played at his funeral, alongside ABBA's "SOS".

== Release and reception ==
Though scrapped from the final track listing of The Kinks Are the Village Green Preservation Society, the label liked the song enough to decide to release it as a non-album single.

The song was an important single for Davies and the Kinks, coming in a year of declining commercial fortunes for the band. The song had been intended as an album track but after the relative failure of the previous single "Wonderboy" (which only reached No. 36 in the UK), "Days" was rushed out as a single with an old unreleased track "She's Got Everything" (recorded in February 1966 in the same session as "Dedicated Follower of Fashion") as the B-side. Billboard praised the single's "groovy rhythm" and "clever lyric". Record World called it a "pretty rockaballad" that "will have great appeal for the kids". It reached No. 12 on the UK Singles Chart, but failed to chart in the US. This did not help future releases, as the next four Kinks singles failed to reach the top 30 (two of them failing to chart altogether) in the UK.

In 1996 "Days" was used in the advertising celebrating 30 years of Yellow Pages. The accompanying EP was released and charted No. 35 in the UK.

Though not the band's biggest commercial success, it has since become a fan favourite. Ray reflected, "The song has grown in intensity over the years. I didn't think much about the song when I wrote it. Sometimes songs occur like that. You don't think about it, but it's built up quite a lot of mystique over the years. It certainly left me. It belongs to the world now."

== Personnel ==
According to the band researcher Doug Hinman: (Note: Hinman writes Hopkins played piano and Mellotron on the song. The author Andy Miller writes the song includes Hopkins on Mellotron, along with unidentified contributions on piano and Harmonium.)

The Kinks

- Ray Davies – lead vocal, acoustic guitar
- Dave Davies – backing vocal, electric guitar
- Pete Quaife – bass guitar
- Mick Avory – drums

Additional musicians

- Rasa Davies – backing vocal
- Nicky Hopkins – piano, Mellotron

== Kirsty MacColl version ==
"Days"

Single by Kirsty MacColl

from the album Kite
- B-side: "Happy"
- Released: 19 June 1989
- Length: 2:59
- Label: Virgin
- Songwriter: Ray Davies
- Producer: Steve Lillywhite

Kirsty MacColl singles chronology
"Free World" (1989)	"Days" (1989)	"Innocence" (1989)

Kirsty MacColl covered "Days" on her second studio album, Kite (1989). It was released as the album's second single on 19 June 1989 and peaked at No. 12 on the UK Singles Chart, the same position achieved by the Kinks in 1968. In Ireland, MacColl's version charted seven places higher than the original, at No. 9. In 1995, when the song was used in an advertising campaign for the Sony camcorder, it was re-released and reached No. 42 on the UK Singles Chart. It is one of MacColl's most popular singles.

=== Background ===
"Days" was released as the second single from Kite, following "Free World". MacColl's label, Virgin, had intended to release "Days" as the lead single, but MacColl felt the first single from Kite had to be one which she wrote.

Recalling her version of "Days", MacColl told James Bennett in 1994: "I think my version is a bit slower [than the Kinks' original], I wanted to give it the ABBA treatment. I wanted people to think that it's a Kirsty MacColl song when they hear it."

=== Music video ===
The video features MacColl in old fashioned clothing sitting on a meadow and riding in a boat whilst encountering animated animals. The video, which features MacColl's friend and songwriting partner Pete Glenister on guitar, was directed by Simon West and produced by Kate Sylvester. It was shot in April 1989 at Godalming.

=== Critical reception ===
On its release, Music & Media wrote, "A tasteful, folky sing-along tune that many people will know by heart at the end of this summer." Tim Nicholson of Record Mirror considered the song to be "slower and more considered" than "Free World", but added that it "should be right on target [for] the charts." Jerry Smith, reviewer of British music newspaper Music Week, expressed an opinion that after the low performance in the charts of the previous single, the new song, especially the cover version, was unlikely to have any prospects.

Barbara Ellen of New Musical Express commented, "'Days' isn't one of Kirsty's own but remains a good choice. An uneven ballad, it stares with wide and serious eyes at the more sentimental end of the charts." In a retrospective review of Kite, Stewart Mason of AllMusic described MacColl's version of "Days" as a "gorgeous cover" with "thick, lush harmonies".

=== Track listing ===
1. "Days"
2. "Happy"
3. "El Paso"
4. "Still Life"
5. "Please Help Me, I'm Falling"

The single was released in multiple formats. Each featured "Days" and "Happy", and all bar the 7" and cassette featured "Still Life". Both CD formats (the standard case and the Kite-shaped case) had "Please Help Me, I'm Falling", whilst "El Paso" was only available on the 10".

== Charts ==
The Kinks' version weekly chart performance
Chart (1968)	Peak position
Belgium (Ultratop 50 Flanders)	17
Belgium (Ultratop 40 Wallonia)	38
Denmark (Danmarks Radio)	11
Netherlands (Dutch Top 40)	7
Netherlands (Single Top 100)	6
New Zealand (Listener)	11
Sweden (Tio i Topp)	13
UK (Disc and Music Echo)	10
UK (Melody Maker)	14
UK (New Musical Express)	10
UK (Record Retailer)	12
West Germany (Musikmarkt)	28

Kirsty MacColl version weekly chart performance
Year	Chart	Peak position
1989
1989	Belgium (Ultratop 50 Flanders)	45
1989	Europe (Eurochart Hot 100)	41
1989	Ireland (IRMA)	9
1989	UK Singles (Official Charts)	12
1995	Scottish Singles Sales (Official Charts)	36
1995	UK Singles (Official Charts)	42
