= Andy Miller (writer) =

British writer and editor

Andy Miller is a British writer and editor. He has published three books and numerous items of journalism. Along with John Mitchinson he presents Unbound's literature podcast Backlisted ('giving new life to old books').

His 2014 The Year of Reading Dangerously chronicled an attempt to read 50 of the books he felt he ought to have already read, and was described in The Guardian as "a heroic and amusing attempt to get back to the classics".

His 2002 Tilting at Windmills describes his hatred of almost all sport and his attempt to succeed in miniature golf (known as "Crazy Golf" in Britain). The Guardian said that he "proves himself to be an amusing and occasionally very funny writer. That may sound like faint praise but it really isn't, the writing of halfway decent comic prose being a skill even more underrated than [winning a Crazy Golf hole]".

In September 2017 Miller appeared on BBC Radio 4's The Museum of Curiosity. His hypothetical donation to this imaginary museum was "an empty honey jar and a burst balloon", being the birthday gifts presented to Eeyore by Winnie-the-Pooh and Piglet.

== Selected publications ==
- The Year of Reading Dangerously: How Fifty Great Books Saved My Life (2014, Fourth Estate: ISBN 978-0007255757)
- The Kinks Are the Village Green Preservation Society (2004, Continuum: ISBN 978-0826414984
- Tilting at Windmills: How I Tried to Stop Worrying and Love Sport (2002, Viking: ISBN 978-0670896417)
