= The Journey, Pt. 1 =

Compilation album by the Kinks
- Released: 24 March 2023
- Genre: Rock
- Length: 112:34
- Label: Sony BMG
- Producer: Shel Talmy; Ray Davies
- Compiler: Ray Davies; Dave Davies; Mick Avory

The Kinks chronology
The Essential Kinks (2014)	The Journey, Pt. 1 (2023)	The Journey, Pt. 2 (2023)

The Journey, Pt. 1 is a compilation album by the English rock band the Kinks, released on 24 March 2023. A second part was released later in 2023, and a third and final part was released on 11 July 2025.

== Background ==
The Journey, Pt. 1 is one of the three albums released in celebration of the Kinks' 60th anniversary. The compilation was created to "reflect the trials and tribulations of their journey through life together as a band since 1963". The compilation is split into four sides, those being: Side 1: "Songs about becoming a man, the search for adventure, finding an identity and a girl", side 2 is "Songs of ambition achieved, bitter taste of success, loss of friends, the past comes back and bites you in the back-side", side 3 is "Days and nights of a lost soul, songs of regret and reflection of happier times", and side 4 is "A new start, a new love, but have you really changed? Still haunted by the quest and the girl".

== Reception ==
Professional ratings
Review scores
Source	Rating
AllMusic	4/5 stars
Rolling Stone Germany	4/5 stars
The Vinyl District	A+

AllMusic critic Mark Deming stated that it "isn't afraid to look deep into the emotional arc of their recordings" and that it "will hold few surprises, but the sequence is more intelligent and artful than the vast majority of reissues mining their catalog, and Ray Davies, Dave Davies, and Mick Avory offer their thoughts on the songs in the liner notes, though no one shares more than a short paragraph, and with rare exceptions Dave and Mick can't be bothered to cough up more than a sentence.", ending that it is a "fine starter, and while Kinks cultists will already own nearly all of this, the presentation is pleasing and answers any questions about why this band still matters."

== Track listing ==
All songs by Ray Davies, except for "Wait Till the Summer Comes Along", "Mindless Child of Motherhood", and "Strangers", which were written by Dave Davies, and "Death of a Clown", which was written by Ray and Dave Davies.

=== CD and digital release ===
==== Disc one ====
Songs about becoming a man, the search for adventure, finding an identity and a girl

No.	Title	Original UK release	Length
1.	"You Really Got Me"	Kinks	2:13
2.	"All Day and All of the Night"	Non-album single	2:22
3.	"It's All Right"	B-side to "You Really Got Me"	2:36
4.	"Who'll Be the Next in Line"	B-side to "Ev'rybody's Gonna Be Happy"	2:01
5.	"Tired of Waiting for You"	Kinda Kinks	2:31
6.	"Dandy"	Face to Face	2:11
7.	"She's Got Everything"	B-side to "Days" (1968)	3:08
8.	"Just Can’t Go to Sleep"	Kinks	1:59
9.	"Stop Your Sobbing"	Kinks	2:05
10.	"Wait Till the Summer Comes Along"	Kwyet Kinks (EP)	2:06
11.	"So Long"	Kinda Kinks	2:08
12.	"I'm Not Like Everybody Else"	B-side to "Sunny Afternoon" (1966)	3:29

Songs of ambition achieved, bitter taste of success, loss of friends, the past comes back and bites you in the back-side

No.	Title	Original UK release	Length
13.	"Dead End Street"	Non-album single	3:23
14.	"Wonderboy"	Non-album single (1968)	2:51
15.	"Schooldays"	Schoolboys in Disgrace	3:32
16.	"The Hard Way"	Schoolboys in Disgrace	2:35
17.	"Mindless Child of Motherhood"	B-side to "Drivin'"	3:16
18.	"Supersonic Rocket Ship"	Everybody's in Show-Biz	3:29
19.	"I'm in Disgrace"	Schoolboys in Disgrace	3:22
20.	"Do You Remember Walter?"	The Kinks Are the Village Green Preservation Society	2:25
Total length:			53:51

==== Disc two ====
Days and nights of a lost soul, songs of regret and reflection of happier times

No.	Title	Original UK release	Length
1.	"Too Much on My Mind"	Face to Face	2:28
2.	"Nothin' in the World Can Stop Me Worryin' 'Bout That Girl"	Kinda Kinks	2:45
3.	"Days"	Non-album single (Note: Appears on some editions on The Kinks Are the Village Green Preservation Society.)	2:53
4.	"The Last of the Steam Powered Trains"	The Kinks Are the Village Green Preservation Society	4:10
5.	"Where Have All the Good Times Gone"	The Kink Kontroversy	2:49
6.	"Strangers"	Lola Versus Powerman and the Moneygoround, Part One	3:20
7.	"It's Too Late"	The Kink Kontroversy	2:35
8.	"Sitting in the Midday Sun"	Preservation Act 1	3:45

A new start, a new love, but have you really changed? Still haunted by the quest and the girl

No.	Title	Original UK release	Length
9.	"Waterloo Sunset"	Something Else by the Kinks	3:14
10.	"Australia"	Arthur (Or the Decline and Fall of the British Empire) (1969)	6:45
11.	"No More Looking Back"	Schoolboys in Disgrace	4:27
12.	"Death of a Clown"	Something Else by the Kinks	3:03
13.	"Celluloid Heroes"	Everybody's in Show-Biz	6:00
14.	"Act Nice and Gentle"	B-side to "Waterloo Sunset"	2:40
15.	"This Is Where I Belong"	B-side to "Mr. Pleasant" (promo copies only); Kinks Kollectables	2:25
16.	"Shangri-La"	Arthur (Or the Decline and Fall of the British Empire)	5:21
Total length:			59:02

== Charts ==
Weekly chart performance for The Journey Pt. 1
Chart (2023)	Peak position
Austrian Albums (Ö3 Austria)	75
German Albums (Offizielle Top 100)	37
Scottish Albums (Official Charts)	10
Swiss Albums (Schweizer Hitparade)	71
UK Albums (Official Charts)	41
US Top Album Sales (Billboard)	88
