= The Journey, Pt. 2 =

Compilation album by the Kinks
- Released: 17 November 2023
- Studio: Morgan, London
- Genre: Rock
- Length: 108:35
- Label: Sony BMG
- Producer: Shel Talmy; Ray Davies
- Compiler: Ray Davies; Dave Davies; Mick Avory

The Kinks chronology
The Journey, Pt. 1 (2023)	The Journey, Pt. 2 (2023)	The Journey, Pt. 3 (2025)

The Journey, Pt. 2 is a compilation album by the English rock band the Kinks, released on 17 November 2023 as the second part in a trilogy of compilation albums, with the first released on 24 March 2023 and a third part released on 11 July 2025. It chronicles the band's 1965–1975 albums from The Kink Kontroversy up to and including The Kinks Present a Soap Opera.

== Background ==
The album's four sides are as follows, side one: "The World Around the Journeyman Starts to Crumble as His Life is Turned Upside Down", side two is "The Journeyman is Led Astray by Ghosts and a Dark Angel", side three is "Our Journeyman is Seduced by Those Ghosts and Demons of the Underworld and Searches for His Lost Innocence" and side four is "Despair Turns to Elation as Journeyman Overcomes His Fear. Reunites with Old Friends".

== Reception ==
Professional ratings
Review scores
Source	Rating
AllMusic	3.5/5 stars
Spill Magazine	4.5/5 stars
The Vinyl District	A−

In an AllMusic review, Mark Deming stated the "great band takes a look back at its career and the themes and ideas behind its songs." and how it "is dedicated to exploring a fallow period in the story of a truly great band, but the Kinks were truly great, and even their lesser material was smarter, more interesting, and more ambitious than what nearly all their peers were doing, and that is made clear on this album." When writing for Spill Magazine, Aaron Badgley gave the album four and a half out of five, joking that it should be a "kompilation" because it is a Kinks compilation, ending that it "does serve as an excellent introduction to the wonderful world of The Kinks." During a review for The Vinyl District, Steve Matteo wrote that its an "excellent package that was imaginatively conceived".

== Track listing ==
All songs by Ray Davies, except for "Creeping Jean", "Susannah's Still Alive", and "Lincoln County", which were written by Dave Davies.

=== CD and digital release ===
==== Disc one ====
The world around the journeyman starts to crumble as his life is turned upside down

No.	Title	Original UK release	Length
1.	"Till the End of the Day"	The Kink Kontroversy (1965)	2:21
2.	"Preservation"	Non-album single (1974); Preservation: A Play in Two Acts (1991)	3:37
3.	"David Watts"	Something Else by the Kinks (1967)	2:40
4.	"This Time Tomorrow" (Alternate Take)	Previously unreleased; original version appears on Lola Versus Powerman and the Moneygoround, Part One (1970)	3:22
5.	"A Well Respected Man"	Kwyet Kinks (EP) (1965)	2:41
6.	"Monica"	The Kinks Are the Village Green Preservation Society (1968)	3:08
7.	"Scrapheap City"	Preservation Act 2 (1974)	3:16
8.	"He's Evil"	Preservation Act 2	3:22

The journeyman is led astray by ghosts and a dark angel

No.	Title	Original UK release	Length
9.	"Lola"	Lola Versus Powerman and the Moneygoround, Part One	4:03
10.	"Sunny Afternoon"	Face to Face (1966)	3:36
11.	"Animal Farm"	The Kinks Are the Village Green Preservation Society	2:57
12.	"Creeping Jean"	B-side to "Hold My Hand" (1969)	3:14
13.	"Two Sisters"	Something Else by the Kinks	2:01
14.	"See My Friends"	Non-album single (1965)	2:44
15.	"Money Talks" (2023 mix)	Preservation Act 2	3:44
16.	"No Return"	Something Else by the Kinks	2:00
17.	"Don't You Fret"	Kwyet Kinks (EP)	2:43
Total length:			50:26

==== Disc two ====
Our journeyman is seduced by those ghosts and demons of the underworld and searches for his lost innocence

No.	Title	Original UK releas	Length
1.	"I Need You"	B-side to "Set Me Free" (1965)	2:23
2.	"Rainy Day in June"	Face to Face	3:10
3.	"Dedicated Follower of Fashion"	Non-album single (1966)	3:05
4.	"Where Are They Now?" (2023 mix)	Preservation Act 1 (1973) (Note: Preservation Act 1 is erroneously listed as having been released in 1974.)	3:28
5.	"Wicked Annabella"	The Kinks Are the Village Green Preservation Society	2:40
6.	"Alcohol"	Muswell Hillbillies (1971)	3:37
7.	"Susannah's Still Alive"	Non-album single (1967)	2:22
8.	"20th Century Man"	Muswell Hillbillies	5:40
9.	"Sitting by the Riverside"	The Kinks Are the Village Green Preservation Society	2:21
10.	"Artificial Man" (2023 mix)	Preservation Act 2	5:29

Despair turns to elation as journeyman overcomes his fear. Reunites with old friends

No.	Title	Original UK release	Length
11.	"Everybody's a Star (Starmaker)" (live at the New Victoria Theatre (Note: Listed with the prefix 'New Victoria Suite'))	Previously unreleased; original version appears on The Kinks Present a Soap Opera (1975)	3:29
12.	"Slum Kids" (live at the New Victoria Theatre)	Previously unreleased; original version appears on the 1998 CD reissue of Preservation Act 2	4:26
13.	"(A) Face in the Crowd" (live at the New Victoria Theatre)	Previously unreleased; original version appears on The Kinks Present a Soap Opera	2:53
14.	"Holiday Romance"	The Kinks Present a Soap Opera	3:10
15.	"Big Sky"	The Kinks Are the Village Green Preservation Society	2:50
16.	"Lincoln County"	Non-album single (1968)	3:19
17.	"God's Children"	Percy (1971)	3:16
Total length:			58:09

== Charts ==
Weekly chart performance for The Journey Pt. 2
Chart (2023)	Peak position
Austrian Albums (Ö3 Austria)	45
German Albums (Offizielle Top 100)	63
Scottish Albums (Official Charts)	18
UK Albums (Official Charts)	93
