= Picture Book (The Kinks album) =

Box set by the Kinks
- Released: 8 December 2008
- Recorded: 1963–1995
- Genres: Rock, pop
- Label: Universal/Sanctuary
- Producers: Ray Davies, Shel Talmy, The Kinks, others

The Kinks chronology
The Ultimate Collection (2002)	Picture Book (2008)	The Kinks in Mono (2012)

Professional ratings
Review scores
Source	Rating
Allmusic	4.5/5 stars
Belfast Telegraph	4/5 stars
The Guardian	3/5 stars

Picture Book is a six-disc box set of material by the Kinks released in December 2008.

== Overview ==
Picture Book compiles selections from the group's four decade-long career with previously unreleased demos and outtakes. The track listing for the collection is mostly in chronological order. The box set also comes with a 60-page booklet featuring a biography of the band, a timeline, and photos.

== Track listing ==
Disc one

1. "Brian Matthew Introduces The Kinks" (Live at the BBC)
2. "You Really Got Me"
3. "I'm a Hog for You Baby" (Demo)
  - performed by The Bollweevils
4. "I Believed You" (Demo)
  - performed by The Bollweevils
5. "Long Tall Sally" (Mono Mix)
6. "I Don't Need You Anymore"
  - performed by The Ravens
7. "Stop Your Sobbing"
8. "I Gotta Move"
9. "Don't Ever Let Me Go"
10. "All Day and All of the Night"
11. "Tired of Waiting for You"
12. "Come on Now" (Mono Outtake with Two False Starts)
13. "There's a New World Just Opening For Me" (Mono Kassner Publishing Demo)
14. "Ev'rybody's Gonna Be Happy"
15. "Who'll Be the Next in Line"
16. "Time Will Tell"
17. "Set Me Free"
18. "I Need You"
19. "See My Friends"
20. "Wait Till the Summer Comes Along"
21. "I Go to Sleep" (Demo Version)
22. "A Little Bit of Sunlight" (Kassner Publishing Demo)
23. "This I Know" (Demo)
24. "A Well Respected Man"
25. "This Strange Effect" (Live at Aeolian Hall, 1965)
26. "Milk Cow Blues"
27. "Ring the Bells"
28. "I'm on an Island"
29. "Till the End of the Day"
30. "Where Have All the Good Times Gone"
31. "All Night Stand" (Demo)
  - performed by Ray Davies
32. "And I Will Love You" (Mono Mix)
33. "Sitting on My Sofa"

Disc two

1. "Dedicated Follower of Fashion" (Alternate Version)
2. "She's Got Everything" (Stereo Version)
3. "Mr. Reporter" (Ray Davies Vocal Version)
4. "Sunny Afternoon"
5. "I'm Not Like Everybody Else" (Mono Mix)
6. "This Is Where I Belong"
7. "Rosie Won't You Please Come Home"
8. "Too Much on My Mind" (Stereo Mix)
9. "Session Man"
10. "End of the Season"
11. "Dead End Street" (First Version)
12. "Village Green" (Stereo Mix)
13. "Two Sisters"
14. "David Watts"
15. "Mister Pleasant"
16. "Waterloo Sunset"
17. "Death of a Clown"
18. "Lavender Hill" (Mono Mix)
19. "Good Luck Charm"
20. "Autumn Almanac"
21. "Susannah's Still Alive"
22. "Animal Farm" (Stereo Mix)
23. "Rosemary Rose" (Mono Mix)
24. "Berkeley Mews" (Mono Mix)
25. "Lincoln County" (Mono)
26. "Picture Book"
27. "Days" (Stereo Mix)
28. "Misty Water" (Stereo Mix)

Disc three

1. "Love Me Till the Sun Shines" (BBC Top Gear Session Brian Matthew Intro & Outro)
2. "The Village Green Preservation Society" (Stereo Mix)
3. "Big Sky" (Stereo Mix)
4. "King Kong" (Mono Mix)
5. "Drivin'" (Mono)
6. "Some Mother's Son" (Mono)
7. "Victoria" (Mono)
8. "Shangri-La" (Mono)
9. "Arthur" (Mono)
10. "Got to Be Free"
11. "Lola" (Mono 'Cherry Cola' Single Version)
12. "Get Back in Line"
13. "The Moneygoround"
14. "Strangers"
15. "Apeman" (Stereo Alternate Version)
16. "God's Children"
17. "The Way Love Used to Be"
18. "Moments"
19. "Muswell Hillbilly"
20. "Oklahoma U.S.A."
21. "20th Century Man"
22. "Here Come the People in Grey"

Disc four

1. "Skin and Bone"
2. "Alcohol" (Live)
3. "Celluloid Heroes"
4. "Sitting in My Hotel"
5. "Supersonic Rocket Ship"
6. "You Don't Know My Name"
7. "One of the Survivors"
8. "Sitting in the Midday Sun"
9. "Sweet Lady Genevieve"
10. "Daylight"
11. "Mirror of Love"
12. "Artificial Man"
13. "Preservation"
14. "Slum Kids" (Live)
15. "Holiday Romance"
16. "(A) Face in the Crowd"
17. "No More Looking Back"
18. "Sleepwalker"
19. "The Poseur"

Disc five

1. "Sleepless Night"
2. "Father Christmas"
3. "Misfits"
4. "A Rock 'N' Roll Fantasy"
5. "Little Bit of Emotion"
6. "Attitude"
7. "Hidden Quality"
8. "A Gallon of Gas" [longer studio edit with no overdubs]
9. "Catch Me Now I'm Falling"
10. "Nuclear Love" (Demo)
11. "Duke" (Demo)
12. "Maybe I Love You" (Demo)
13. "Stolen Away Your Heart" (Demo)
14. "Low Budget" (Live)
15. "Better Things" (Stereo Mix)
16. "Destroyer"
17. "Yo-Yo"
18. "Art Lover"
19. "Long Distance"

Disc six

1. "Heart of Gold"
2. "Come Dancing" (Demo Remix)
3. "State of Confusion"
4. "Do It Again"
5. "Living on a Thin Line"
6. "Summer's Gone"
7. "How Are You"
8. "The Road" (Live)
9. "The Million-Pound-Semi-Detached"
10. "Down All the Days (Till 1992)"
11. "The Informer"
12. "Phobia"
13. "Only a Dream"
14. "Drift Away"
15. "Scattered"
16. "Do You Remember Walter?" (Live)
17. "To the Bone" (Demo)
