= Rosy Won't You Please Come Home =

Song by the Kinks

from the album Face to Face
- Released: 28 October 1966
- Recorded: 6 June 1966
- Studio: Pye, London
- Genre: Baroque pop
- Label: Pye
- Songwriter(s): Ray Davies
- Producer(s): Shel Talmy

"Rosy Won't You Please Come Home" is a song by the British rock band the Kinks. The song first appeared on the album Face to Face in 1966, and, like all of the songs on the album, was written by Ray Davies.

== Background ==
"Rosy Won't You Please Come Home" was inspired mainly by Rosy Davies, the sister of Ray and Dave Davies. She, along with her husband, Arthur Anning, had moved to Australia in 1964, which devastated Ray to a great extent. On the day that they moved, Ray Davies broke down on the beach after a gig. "I started screaming. A part of my family had left, possibly forever. ... I collapsed in a heap on the sandy beach and wept like a pathetic child", Davies said of the incident. Dave Davies added, "All of a sudden, the fact that they were really leaving finally hit Ray. He ran to the sea screaming and crying." Rosy and Arthur's departure later inspired the premise for the Kinks' 1969 concept album, Arthur (Or the Decline and Fall of the British Empire).

== Release and reception ==
"Rosy Won't You Please Come Home" appeared as the second track on the album Face to Face in October 1966. That same month, the song made an appearance on the French EP Dandy, which also featured "Dandy", "Party Line", and "Fancy". The song also appeared on the compilation album Picture Book.

AllMusic critic Stephen Thomas Erlewine called the track a "classic" and cited the song as a highlight from Face to Face.
