= You Can't Stop the Music =

Single by The Kinks

from the album Soap Opera
- B-side: "Have Another Drink"
- Released: 23 May 1975
- Recorded: August – October 1974 at Konk Studios, London
- Genre: Glam rock
- Length: 3:12
- Label: RCA
- Songwriter: Ray Davies
- Producer: Ray Davies

The Kinks singles chronology
"Ducks on the Wall" (1975)	"You Can't Stop the Music" (1975)	"I'm in Disgrace" (1976)

"You Can't Stop the Music" is a song by the British rock band the Kinks. The song, appearing on the band's 1975 album Soap Opera, was written by the band's principal songwriter, Ray Davies.

== Lyrics and music ==
One of the themes of "You Can't Stop the Music" is similar to that of two songs from the Kinks' previous Preservation Act 1 album, "Where Are They Now" and "One of the Survivors" – that rock music can be authentic. The lyrics pay tribute to the inspiration provided by older rock stars, some of whom may not have been big stars, noted that even though the big stars may have faded the power of their music hasn't. At live concerts around the time of the song's release, the band would show pictures and films of Elvis Presley, Bill Haley and the Beatles on the screen as the song was being played. Another theme is that everyone can be a star.

On the album, this message was placed before the lyrics of the song: "And so Norman decides to stop living out his fantasy of being a rock star and accept reality. This is the end for Norman but not for us because there will always be someone ready to take his place -- after all, everybody's a star!"

In the song, the singer (Norman) says that "stars fade away. They vanish in the haze and they're never seen again, but they can't stop the music playing on."

Hartford Courant critic Henry McNulty felt that the following lines from the song summed up Ray Davies' career well:

I've been a star down and out / I've been put on, sat on, punched and spat on / They've called me a faggot, a spiv and a fake / They can knock me down and tread on my face / But they can't stop the music playing on

Montreal Gazette critic Bill Mann similar stated that "the lyrics will give you no small insight into Davies and Co.'s remarkable staying power."

The music of the song rocks out more than some of the other songs on Soap Opera and the band, including Dave Davies' guitar, plays a prominent role, in addition to the brass instruments used on much of the album.

When the Kinks performed the song as part of the Starmaker teleplay on which the album was based, Ray Davies dances in an audience of Kinks' fans watching a Kinks' concert, while his brother Dave Davies leads the band. Kinks' biographer Nick Hasted interpreted this as Ray Davies finally being "able to enjoy the Kinks from the outside", admitting he is nothing special.

== Release and reception ==
"You Can't Stop the Music" was first released in May 1975 on the album Soap Opera, where it was the twelfth and final track on said LP. During that same month, the song was released as the album's third and final UK single, backed with "Have Another Drink" (also from Soap Opera). However, the song did not chart in Britain. The single was also released in June 1975 in Australia and in the Netherlands, but it still did not chart in either country.

AllMusic's Stephen Thomas Erlewine cited "You Can't Stop the Music" as a highlight from Soap Opera. Mann called it "a rocker that is a solid joy." Melody Maker thought it was better than the Kinks' previous single "Ducks on the Wall" but (correctly) predicted that the single would not perform well. Hasted described it as "a rock version of 'Celluloid Heroes' commemorating its strivers and stars, which the music itself will outshine and outlast". Rolling Stone critic John Mendelsohn praised Dave Davies' guitar playing although he said that it amounts to "less than you think you're in for when, at one point, Dave appears to be on the verge, thanks to the miracle of overdubbing, of having it out with an earlier-recorded version of himself."
