= Mr. Churchill Says =

- UK B-side label

Single by the Kinks

from the album Arthur (Or the Decline and Fall of the British Empire)
- A-side: "Victoria"
- Released: 12 December 1969
- Recorded: May–June 1969
- Studio: Pye, London
- Genre: Hard rock
- Label: Pye
- Songwriter: Ray Davies
- Producer: Ray Davies

The Kinks UK singles chronology
"Shangri-La" (1969)	"Mr. Churchill Says" (1969)	"Lola" (1970)

Arthur (Or the Decline and Fall of the British Empire) track listing
- 12 tracks Side one: 1. "Victoria"; 2. "Yes Sir, No Sir"; 3. "Some Mother's Son"; 4. "Drivin'"; 5. "Brainwashed"; 6. "Australia"; Side two: 7. "Shangri-La"; 8. "Mr. Churchill Says"; 9. "She's Bought a Hat Like Princess Marina"; 10. "Young and Innocent Days"; 11. "Nothing to Say"; 12. "Arthur"

"Mr. Churchill Says" is a song written by Ray Davies and released by the Kinks. It appears on the 1969 album Arthur (Or the Decline and Fall of the British Empire).

== Lyrics and music ==
The song is about the struggle of World War II on the people of Great Britain. The song paraphrases parts of several of Prime Minister Winston Churchill's famous speeches including "Never was so much owed by so many to so few", "We shall fight on the beaches", and "This was their finest hour". In addition to Winston Churchill, the song mentions several other political, military and popular figures who were prominent during the war including Max Aitken, 1st Baron Beaverbrook, Bernard Montgomery, 1st Viscount Montgomery of Alamein, Louis Mountbatten and Vera Lynn (quoting her song "We'll Meet Again").

The song features a striking example of integration of sound effects into an arrangement, in this case a vintage air-raid siren which introduces a new section. The Kinks had been experimenting with the use of sound effects since the 1966 Face to Face album. Ray Davies is also featured on lead vocals.

When talking about the song (and Churchill himself) soon after the album's release, Ray Davies stated, "Today TV exposes weaknesses in politicians. ... But I don't know about Winston Churchill. He may have been a bit more ruthless than we've been led to believe. When the battle's over and you've won, you always look good. But what was achieved by it?"

== Release and reception ==
"Mr. Churchill Says" was first released as the second track on the second side of Arthur (Or the Decline and Fall of the British Empire), where it followed "Shangri-La". However, it saw single release on 12 December 1969, where it was released as the B-side of the "Victoria" single in Britain.

Unlike other tracks on Arthur (Or the Decline and Fall of the British Empire), "Mr. Churchill Says" has generally received mixed reviews from critics. Rolling Stone's J.R. Young praised the track, saying that "on "Mr. Churchill Says" the band moves effortlessly into a three or four part number, changing the tempo, the mood, and the melody while never losing a superb dancing beat." However, in his book, Preservation: The Kinks' Music 1964–1974, Andrew Hickey said that the track is "one of the lesser songs on the album, but a necessary breather after the intensity of 'Shangri-La'."

== See also ==
- List of anti-war songs
