= Sweet Lady Genevieve =

Single by the Kinks

from the album Preservation Act 1
- B-side: "Sitting in My Hotel"
- Released: 21 September 1973 (UK)
- Recorded: June 1973
- Studio: Konk Studios, Hornsey, North London
- Genre: Folk rock
- Length: 3:26
- Label: RCA 2418
- Songwriter: Ray Davies
- Producer: Ray Davies

The Kinks singles chronology
"Sitting in the Midday Sun" (1973)	"Sweet Lady Genevieve" (1973)	"Money Talks" (1974)

"Sweet Lady Genevieve" is the third track from the Kinks' 1973 rock opera Preservation Act 1. It was written by Ray Davies.

== Lyrics ==
"Sweet Lady Genevieve" is part of the rock opera, Preservation Act 1, with the lyrics sung by Davies as the "Tramp"—one of the principal figures in the story line. In the track, the Tramp is begging for the forgiveness of his former lover, Genevieve, saying that "this time I'll give you some security and I won’t make promises I can’t keep". Author Andrew Hickey said in his book, Preservation: The Kinks' Music 1964-1974, that the track was "Ray Davies' attempt to reach out to his estranged wife Rasa." The Tramp returns later in the album on "Sitting in the Midday Sun".

== Release ==
The track was released as a single in the UK with "Sitting in My Hotel" as the B-side, taken from an earlier album. The single failed to dent the charts. In America, the song was used as the B-side to "Sitting in the Midday Sun".

== Reception ==
Although "Sweet Lady Genevieve" was not successful commercially, it has since been praised by music critics. Hickey claimed it "may be the last truly great Kinks song" and said that he "can think of few braver artistic works". AllMusic's Stephen Thomas Erlewine called the track "absolutely gorgeous" and labelled it the "real candidate for Davies' forgotten masterpiece". Jason Josephes of Pitchfork Media said that "Sweet Lady Genevieve "is one of the Kinks' greatest singles, a simple porchy folk rock number you'll be humming for days". The track has since appeared on the compilation album Picture Book.
