= Money Talks (The Kinks song) =

Single by the Kinks

from the album Preservation Act 2
- B-side: "Here Comes Flash"
- Released: April 1974
- Recorded: January – March 1974
- Studio: Konk Studios, London
- Genre: Rock
- Length: 3:44
- Label: RCA
- Songwriter: Ray Davies
- Producer: Ray Davies

The Kinks singles chronology
| "Sitting in the Midday Sun" (1973) | "Money Talks" (1974) | "Mirror of Love" (1974) |

"Money Talks" is a song by the British rock band the Kinks. Written by Ray Davies, the song appeared on the band's album Preservation Act 2.

== Lyrics ==
The lyrics of "Money Talks" are part of the story-line of Preservation Act 2. As described by author Andrew Hickey, the track is "just a description of Flash's 'philosophy' – that no one is incorruptible and that anyone will do anything for enough money."

== Release ==
"Money Talks" was released on the album Preservation Act 2, where it was the fourth track on the first side. That same month, the song saw single release in America (as well as Japan and Germany), backed with "Here Comes Flash" (which had appeared on the previous album, Preservation Act 1). The single did not chart in any country.

== Reception ==
Cash Box said that the Kinks "come dynamically across with a strong rocker, capturing a strong T. Rex–Rolling Stones feel throughout" also saying that "infectious as a disk can be, this one is really saying something..."

"Money Talks" has generally received positive reviews from critics. Jason Josephes of Pitchfork Media called the song "one of the many standout cuts" on the album and said that it is an example of Ray Davies' "witty edge, with can't-wait-to-quote lyrics popping up all over the place." Andrew Hickey called the track "one of the catchiest things on Preservation Act 2."
