= Preservation (song) =

Single by The Kinks
- B-side: "Salvation Road" (US)
- Released: 1974 (US)
- Recorded: 1973–1974
- Genre: Rock
- Length: 3:37
- Label: RCA PB-10121
- Songwriter: Ray Davies
- Producer: Ray Davies

The Kinks singles chronology
"Mirror of Love" (1973)	"Preservation" (1974)	"Everybody's a Star (Starmaker)" (1974)

"Preservation" is a non-album single written by Ray Davies and performed by the Kinks in 1974. Although it was related to the two Preservation albums lyrically, it did not appear on either album until it was added to the CD reissue of Preservation Act 1.

== Lyrics and music ==
The lyrics of "Preservation" basically sum up the plot of the two Preservation albums. It describes how "once upon a time in a faraway land, lived a villain called Flash, he was such a wicked man", who "terrorized the people ... broke arms and crushed hands ... ruled with a fist and ... purchased all the land". However, under Flash, the "people were scared" and "they didn't know where to turn." They soon realized that Flash only did what he did for money and "for his own preservation". Now, because Flash broke his promise, "he's got to pay for his crimes and his lies and his evil ways." Unfortunately, the problems for the people will continue, as "it's gonna get rough" in the "story of self preservation".

Musically, the track opens with a guitar riff. "Preservation" also features Ray Davies on vocals, and the track has a rock style. Female backing vocalist appear at the very end of the track.

== Release ==
"Preservation" was not released on either of the Preservation albums when they were first released in 1973 and 1974, respectively. It first was released as a standalone US single, backed with "Salvation Road", the closing track of Preservation Act 2. It did not chart, performing similarly to other Kinks singles of the time. However, it was not released in the UK until it was issued as a bonus track on the 1998 CD Velvel edition of Preservation Act 1. However, unlike most other bonus tracks on CD reissues of Kinks albums, it was placed at the beginning of the track listing (rather than being tacked on at the end), making it the opening track. Andrew Hickey wrote in his book, Preservation: The Kinks' Music 1964-1974, that "by starting the CD with a song in the style of ['Demolition']", the album's "structure is ruined".

== Reception ==
"Preservation" has received mixed reviews. Pitchfork Media described the track as "a lankier, reworded take on the album closer 'Demolition.' 'Preservation' never made the album, instead working as a single that sold the concept of the album." Hickey said that the track "for what it is ... this is decent enough - it's a three-chord glam stomper that wouldn't have sounded at all out of place on 70s rock radio, with a catchy guitar riff - but the lyrics are just a giant infodump rather than being particularly clever or moving."

Cash Box called it "a narrative rocker in the Kinks tradition that has the subtle satire and caustic cynicism that they have become famous for."
