= Johnny Thunder =

Johnny Thunder may refer to:

- Johnny Thunder (singer) (1931–2024), American R&B and pop singer
- "Johnny Thunder" (song), a 1968 song by the Kinks
- Johnny Thunder, an Australian archaeologist character from Lego Adventurers in 1998–2003
- DC Comics characters:
  - Johnny Thunder (superhero), a name used by three superhero characters in DC Comics (1940–present)
  - Johnny Thunder (John Tane), a (non-superhero) fictional Western character from DC Comics (1948 – c. 1997)

== See also ==
- Johnny Thunders (1952–1991), American punk singer
