= Australia (The Kinks song) =

- Australian single label

Song by the Kinks

from the album Arthur (Or the Decline and Fall of the British Empire)
- Released: 10 October 1969
- Recorded: May–June 1969
- Studio: Pye, London
- Genre: Rock
- Length: 6:46
- Label: Pye
- Songwriter: Ray Davies
- Producer: Ray Davies

Arthur (Or the Decline and Fall of the British Empire) track listing
- 12 tracks Side one: 1. "Victoria"; 2. "Yes Sir, No Sir"; 3. "Some Mother's Son"; 4. "Drivin'"; 5. "Brainwashed"; 6. "Australia"; Side two: 7. "Shangri-La"; 8. "Mr. Churchill Says"; 9. "She's Bought a Hat Like Princess Marina"; 10. "Young and Innocent Days"; 11. "Nothing to Say"; 12. "Arthur"

"Australia" is a song by the British rock band the Kinks, appearing on their 1969 album, Arthur (Or the Decline and Fall of the British Empire). It was written by the band's main songwriter, Ray Davies.

== Lyrics and music ==
In the song, the character Derek (who is featured in the story line of Arthur (Or the Decline and Fall of the British Empire)) attempts to convince his father, Arthur, of the great opportunities available in Australia, where there's "no drug addiction" and you can "surf like they do in the USA". Derek's advertisement is compared to John Smith, who campaigned for America in a similar manner, by author Thomas Kitts.

The song also features a jam sequence lasting for approximately half the song, which is atypical for the Kinks. This sequence also features a Wobble Board, an Australian instrument. In the Australian single edit, this section is removed by editing an earlier section of the song into another section during a drum beat, which is then followed by a fade-out.

== Release ==
"Australia" was released in most countries only on Arthur (Or the Decline and Fall of the British Empire), where it was the closing track on side one. In Australia, an abbreviated version of the song was released as a single, with another Arthur track, "She's Bought a Hat Like Princess Marina", on the B-side. The single was commercially unsuccessful.
