= Live at Kelvin Hall =

1967 live album by the Kinks

- UK release

Live album by the Kinks
- Released: 16 August 1967
- Recorded: 1 April 1967 (live), April 1967 (studio)
- Venues: Kelvin Hall, Glasgow
- Studios: Pye, London
- Genres: Rock; pop
- Length: 34:18
- Label: Pye
- Producers: Ray Davies (UK); Shel Talmy (US) (Note: The UK album does not credit a producer, but instead lists Davies as "musical director". The US album is credited as "A Shel Talmy Production", but Hinman only mentions Davies in discussing the album's post-production work.)

The Kinks UK chronology
Sunny Afternoon (1967)	Live at Kelvin Hall (1968)	The Kinks Are the Village Green Preservation Society (1968)

The Kinks US chronology
Face to Face (1966)	The Live Kinks (1967)	Something Else by the Kinks (1968)

The Live Kinks
- US release by Reprise Records

Live at Kelvin Hall is a live album by the English rock group the Kinks. It was recorded at Kelvin Hall in Glasgow, Scotland, in early 1967 and released in August 1967 in the US (as The Live Kinks), and January 1968 in the UK. Live at Kelvin Hall received mixed reviews upon release, and sold poorly.

The album was first re-released on CD in 1987. In 1998, the album was reissued with both the mono and stereo mixes present. Unlike many albums in the Kinks catalogue which have received Deluxe Edition formats, Live at Kelvin Hall was passed on by Andrew Sandoval, who, at one point, attempted to remix the album. The mono mix was absent from the 2011 box set The Kinks in Mono, but was present in the 2005 box set The Pye Album Collection.

== Recording ==
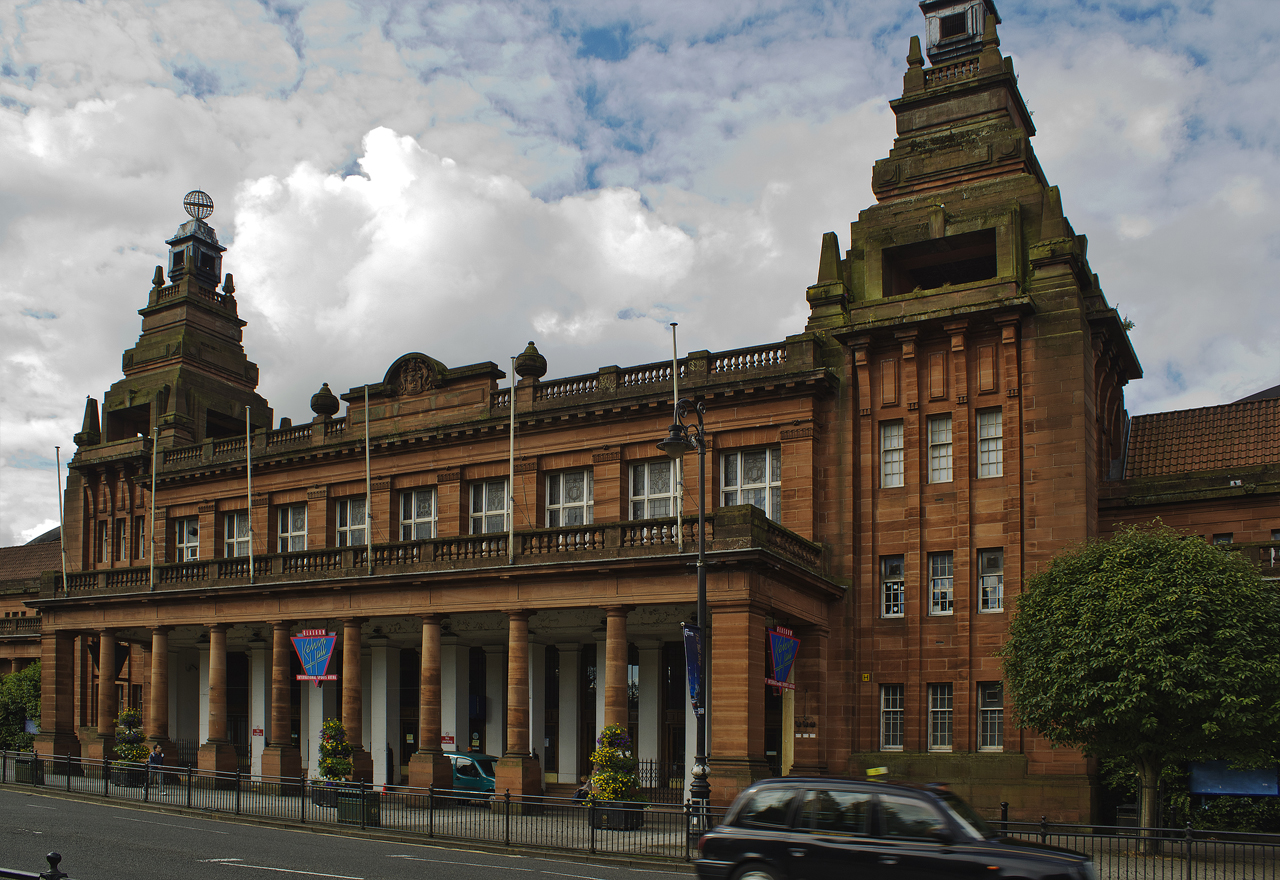
Kelvin Hall in 2011

The Kinks played two sets in the Scene '67 Theatre inside Kelvin Hall on 1 April 1967; one at 6:30 and the other at 9:30 pm, with the bands Sounds Incorporated and the Fortunes opening. The entire concert was recorded on a 4-track Pye Mobile Recording Unit owned by the group's label, Pye Records. The Kinks' set was the finale of a ten-day teen music-festival, sponsored by a local discotheque club and The Daily Record, a Glasgow newspaper.

On 3 April, post-production was underway for the scheduled live album. The group also took part in sessions to "enhance" the recordings—writer Andy Miller notes that ...Kelvin Hall "is perhaps not as live as all that. Sessions were undertaken to 'sweeten' the original tapes. Close listening seems to reveal that the audience hysteria is an extended, repeating tape loop." It is also notable that an entire fourth of the 4-track mix was devoted to the crowd's screams and yells. Doug Hinman, in his 2004 book All Day and All of the Night, also states that "it appears that overdubs [were] made (noticeable ... on the released album's guitar solo on 'Till the End of the Day', and the differing guitar solos between the mono and stereo mixes of 'You Really Got Me')." A press release followed on the same day, announcing that a live album was scheduled for future release.

The album opens with the energetic audience and a "rather distant MC" introducing the band. Dave Davies tunes up his guitar and the group begin performing. According to critic Greg Shaw, side one features the group's more melodic material, while on side two, the tension builds with harder, rockier material. Jim Green of Trouser Press wrote of the band's "mercurial" gigs in which they "seemingly pull songs out of thin air" and perform unexpected material, describing this as a characteristic that dates back to the group's early days and which is represented on Live at Kelvin Hall. Dave Davies recalled: "Yeah – we did the Batman theme. Off the wall. I think that was why road managers didn't want to work with us – 'Strange people, they change their act every night!'"

Paul Williams of Rolling Stone commented on the crowd sounds: "Have you ever listened to The Live Kinks? It's almost musique concrete. Never has an audience been so unselfconsciously part of the experience. Maybe because nothing could come off of a Kinks record that wasn’t part of their unique world-system, or maybe there’s some sort of real bond between Kinks-lovers the world over." Charles Shaar Murray wrote the band sound "curiously tinny and underpowered" underneath "the up-front, full-bodied quality of the screaming." He elaborated that "until you get your ears properly adjusted, it's a recording of an audience bananaing out with accompaniment by The Kinks ... The screaming, therefore, becomes a constant noise element which you mentally filter in and out according to whim." He compared the effect to listening to records in a noisy environment and described it as "a conscious artistic choice" from the album's producer; "ultimately it ends up as almost a Velvets effect, like the feedback on 'Sister Ray'". Shaw wrote that the Kinks "play on [the] hysteria like a fourth instrument".

== Release and reception ==
Live at Kelvin Hall was released in the US as The Live Kinks on 16 August 1967, where it went virtually unnoticed. It reached number 162 in the Billboard Top LPs chart. The album fared no better in the UK; upon release in January 1968 as Live at Kelvin Hall, it received only moderate advertising and mixed reviews. New Musical Express: "... at Glasgow the Kinks had every encouragement to give a good show and what you can hear above the audience noise is good. I don't know if I like a backing of whistles and screams." Detroit Free Press reviewer Loraine Alterman wrote that: "Except for the annoying screaming meant to prove this was recorded live, the collection of Kinks' member Ray Davies' songs makes this a top notch album", and drew attention to "A Well Respected Man" and "Sunny Afternoon" for making "perceptive social comments". Live at Kelvin Hall failed to chart.

Fusion magazine writer Greg Shaw described it in 1971 as "one of the greatest live albums ever". In 1972, Rolling Stone writer Metal Mike Saunders described the album as "an evocation of everything the Kinks have ever meant at their best: effeteness (what vocals!) coupled with raucousness, sensitivity combined with the inebriated attitude that is still a large component of Kinks performances." In 1975, Murray described Kelvin Hall as the only Kinks album "that seems to have disappeared in a pile of smoke", writing that the album was "apparently most unwelcome" on release in 1967 and soon disappeared from display racks. Reviewing the album for NME, he described it as "a great live album", as much for its ambience as its "great playing", and counted it alongside specific live albums by the Rolling Stones, the Doors, David Bowie and Jimi Hendrix as "a great documentary album, a great what-goes-on album".

In 1998, the album was remastered by Castle Music in stereophonic and mono sound. Reviewing the reissue for Uncut, Ian MacDonald described Kelvin Hall as "a frenzied audio-document of Sixties beat-hysteria, taped live in a sea of ceaseless screaming". He wrote that as the band retired from touring for several years following the album's original release, the 1967 album "was, in career terms, an endearingly typical cock-up. Jon Savage of Mojo wrote in 2004 that while the album "was exciting now", it originally "seemed an anachronism". In a mixed review for AllMusic, Stephen Thomas Erlewine described the album as "hard going". He wrote that while the album is valuable as a live document of the Kinks, the "damn noisy" crowd make it "hard to hear anything besides screaming". He added: "The band is buried under this cacophony, and while they turn out some energetic performances [...] they're just sloppy enough to be a little tiring when combined with the roaring crowd."

== Track listing ==
All tracks by Ray Davies, except where noted

Side one

1. "Till the End of the Day" – 3:20
2. "A Well Respected Man"* – 3:12
3. "You're Looking Fine" – 3:28
4. "Sunny Afternoon" – 4:40
5. "Dandy" – 2:06

Side two

1. "I'm on an Island" – 2:53
2. "Come on Now" – 3:02
3. "You Really Got Me" – 2:13
4. Medley – 8:53

- "Milk Cow Blues" (John Estes)
- "Batman Theme" (Neil Hefti)
- "Tired of Waiting for You"

== Personnel ==
According to Doug Hinman and the LP's liner notes:

The Kinks

- Ray Davies – lead and backing vocals, electric and acoustic guitars; musical director (UK edition)
- Dave Davies – backing vocals, electric guitar; lead vocals ("You're Looking Fine", "Come on Now" and medley)
- Pete Quaife – backing vocals, bass
- Mick Avory – drums

Additional production

- Alan MacKenzie – engineer
- Vic Maile – assistant engineer
- Alan O'Duffy – assistant engineer
- Shel Talmy – producer (US edition)

== Charts ==
Weekly chart performance
Chart (1967)	Peak position
US Billboard Top LPs	162
US Cash Box Top 100 Albums	83
US Record World 100 Top LPs	96
