= The Journey, Pt. 3 =

Compilation album by the Kinks
- Released: 11 July 2025
- Genre: Rock
- Length: 102:45
- Label: Sony BMG
- Producer: Ray Davies
- Compiler: Ray Davies; Dave Davies; Mick Avory

The Kinks chronology
The Journey, Pt. 2 (2023)	The Journey, Pt. 3 (2025)

The Journey, Pt. 3 is a compilation album by the English rock band the Kinks, It was released on 11 July 2025, as the third and final part in a trilogy of compilation albums, with the first two parts released in 2023. Part 1 was released on 24 March, while Part 2 was released on 17 November. The Journey, Pt. 3 chronicles the band's 1977–1984 albums from Sleepwalker to Word of Mouth, plus a previously unreleased Kinks concert from 1993.

== Background ==
The Journey, Pt. 3 is the third of three albums released in celebration of the Kinks' 60th anniversary, after The Journey Pts. 1 and 2 alongside a limited edition reissue of the "You Really Got Me" single to promote its 60th anniversary, which was released on 16 August 2024. The previous two parts in the 60th anniversary anthology albums consisted of tracks the Kinks recorded from 1964 to 1975. On 18 October 2024, however, the Kinks reissued their albums Sleepwalker (from 1977) and Misfits (from 1978) on vinyl, CD, and digital, which Dave Davies promoted on his social media accounts. Unlike The Journey, Pts. 1 and 2, which had split the albums up into 4 different themes, The Journey, Pt. 3 splits the album into 2 different sections, those being, sides one and two (disc one): "1977–1984 Newly Remastered" and sides three and four (disc two) as "Live at the Royal Albert Hall, 1993".

== Royal Albert Hall, 1993 ==
Disc two on Part 3 consists of a previously unreleased show performed at the Royal Albert Hall, performed on 11 July 1993, in support of their album Phobia. This 16 song recording had been recently discovered in the band's Konk Studio archives. Mick Avory reflected on the live show, "That went down well. That was a good thing to do at the time." Although he left the band in 1984, he referred to his replacement, Bob Henrit, as "a good replacement" and that he "naturally played sort of loud, which suited the larger venues The Kinks were playing then." Dave Davies also commented on the Royal Albert Hall show stating that "as far as performances go, it was a high point achievement of the Kinks." This show is the sole representative of the years 1986–1997 in their entire 60th anniversary anthology series, as Avory had told AllMusic in March 2023 that he, Dave, and Ray Davies had been asked by Sony BMG to select tracks between 1964 and 1984.

== Track listing ==
All songs by Ray Davies, except for "Living on a Thin Line", which was written by Dave Davies, and "Death of a Clown", which was written by Ray and Dave Davies.

=== Disc one ===
No.	Title	Original UK release	Length
1.	"Catch Me Now I'm Falling" (single edit)	Low Budget (1979)	4:14
2.	"(Wish I Could Fly Like) Superman"	Low Budget	3:37
3.	"A Rock 'n' Roll Fantasy"	Misfits (1978)	5:03
4.	"Sleepwalker"	Sleepwalker (1977)	4:04
5.	"Living on a Thin Line"	Word of Mouth (1984)	4:11
6.	"Come Dancing"	State of Confusion (1983)	3:57
7.	"Around the Dial"	Give the People What They Want (1981)	4:47
8.	"Do It Again"	Word of Mouth	4:12
9.	"Better Things" (single mix)	Give the People What They Want	3:01
10.	"Destroyer"	Give the People What They Want	3:47
11.	"Low Budget"	Low Budget	3:52
12.	"Misfits"	Misfits	4:42
Total length:			49:21

=== Disc two ===
No.	Title	Original studio release	Length
1.	"One of Our DJs Is Missing"	No studio recording was done; Used as an overture for the Royal Albert Hall Show	2:14
2.	"Till the End of the Day"	The Kink Kontroversy (1965)	2:14
3.	"Where Have All the Good Times Gone"	The Kink Kontroversy	2:47
4.	"Low Budget"	Low Budget	4:50
5.	"Apeman"	Lola Versus Powerman and the Moneygoround, Part One (1970)	2:03
6.	"Phobia"	Phobia (1993)	3:41
7.	"Only a Dream"	Phobia	4:50
8.	"Scattered"	Phobia	3:28
9.	"Celluloid Heroes"	Everybody's in Show-Biz (1972)	5:30
10.	"I'm Not Like Everybody Else"	B side to "Sunny Afternoon" (1966)	6:31
11.	"Dedicated Follower of Fashion"	Non album single (1966)	1:49
12.	"The Informer"	Phobia	3:51
13.	"Death of a Clown"	Something Else by the Kinks (1967)	1:23
14.	"Sunny Afternoon"	Face to Face (1966)	2:13
15.	"You Really Got Me"	Kinks (1964)	2:45
16.	"Days"	Did Ya (EP) (1991)	3:28
Total length:			53:26

== Charts ==
Chart performance for The Journey, Pt. 3
Chart (2025)	Peak position
French Rock & Metal Albums (SNEP)	25
