= One of the Survivors =

Single by The Kinks

from the album Preservation Act 1
- B-side: "Scrapheap City"
- Released: 20 April 1973
- Recorded: 9–10 March 1973 at Konk Studios, Hornsey, North London
- Genre: Rock
- Length: 4:31 (album version); 4:07 (single edit)
- Label: RCA
- Songwriter: Ray Davies
- Producer: Ray Davies

The Kinks singles chronology
"Celluloid Heroes" (1972)	"One of the Survivors" (1973)	"Sitting in the Midday Sun" (1973)

"One of the Survivors" is a song by the British rock band the Kinks. Appearing on their 1973 concept album Preservation Act 1, the song was written by the band's main songwriter, Ray Davies.

== Lyrics ==
"One of the Survivors" references the character Johnny Thunder, who had appeared in the song of the same name from the Kinks' 1968 album The Kinks Are the Village Green Preservation Society. However, since his appearance in "Johnny Thunder" in 1968, Johnny Thunder, who is called "one of the survivors" by the singer of the song, has grown "little overweight, and his sideburns are turnin' grey, but he still likes to bebop, boogie and jive to his worn out seventy-eights."

The song also references many musicians from the 1950s (that Johnny Thunder enjoys to listen to), such as Jerry Lee Lewis, Dion and The Belmonts and Johnny and The Hurricanes, as well as songs such as "Hound Dog", "Blue Suede Shoes", and "Great Balls of Fire".

== Release ==
"One of the Survivors" was first released as a single in America on 20 April 1973. Backed with "Scrapheap City" (later to appear on Preservation Act 2), the single found only small popularity, peaking at a mediocre No. 108 in America. However, the single was the most successful since "20th Century Man" in 1971. The single was not released in the UK, but "One of the Survivors" did appear as the B-side of "Sitting in the Midday Sun" in said country. That single did not chart.

"One of the Survivors" also appeared on Preservation Act 1 in June 1973. The album received poor commercial and critical popularity, only hitting No. 177 in America, and not charting in Britain. Also, the single edit of "One of the Survivors" has since appeared as a bonus track on some CD reissues of Preservation Act 1.

== Reception ==
"One of the Survivors" has received mixed reception from critics. Record World said that "English quartet rocks 'em and socks 'em with nostalgic tribute to some old rock 'n rollers like Jerry Lee Lewis, Dion & Belmonts, Danny & the Juniors and Johnny & the Hurricanes." AllMusic's Stephen Thomas Erlewine cited the track as a highlight from Preservation Act 1. However, in a more critical view, author Andrew Hickey called the track one of the two weakest songs on Preservation Act 1 (the other being "Where Are They Now?").
