= Well Respected Kinks =

1966 compilation album by the Kinks

Greatest hits album by the Kinks
- Released: 2 September 1966
- Recorded: 1964–1965
- Studio: Pye and IBC, London
- Genre: Rock and roll
- Label: Marble Arch
- Producer: Shel Talmy

The Kinks UK chronology
The Kink Kontroversy (1965)	Well Respected Kinks (1966)	Face to Face (1966)

Well Respected Kinks is a compilation album by the English rock band the Kinks. It was released on 2 September 1966 in the United Kingdom on Pye Records's Marble Arch label. The album consists of previously issued singles and EP tracks recorded in 1964 and 1965. It was issued in both mono and simulated stereo formats.

The Kinks' most recent single "Sunny Afternoon" topped the British charts in mid-1966, but contractual issues delayed the August release of their next album Face to Face; Pye assembled the compilation in order to maintain the band's popularity before Face to Face could be released in late October. Well Respected Kinks spent 31 weeks on the British Record Retailer magazine chart, peaking at number 5. It also reached number 2 in Finland.

== Track listing ==
All songs written by Ray Davies, except "Wait Till the Summer Comes Along" by Dave Davies.

Side one

1. "A Well Respected Man" – 2:44
2. "Where Have All the Good Times Gone" – 2:53
3. "Till the End of the Day" – 2:20
4. "Set Me Free" – 2:12
5. "Tired of Waiting for You" – 2:34

Side two

1. "All Day and All of the Night" – 2:24
2. "I Gotta Move" – 2:26
3. "Don't You Fret" – 2:46
4. "Wait Till the Summer Comes Along" – 2:10
5. "You Really Got Me" – 2:14

== Charts ==
Weekly chart performance for Well Respected Kinks
Chart (1966–67)	Peak position
Finland Soumen Virallinen LPs Chart	2
UK Record Retailer LPs Chart	5
UK Melody Maker Top Ten LPs	5
UK New Musical Express Best Selling LPs	4
