= Johnny Thunder (song) =

1968 song the Kinks

Song by the Kinks

from the album The Kinks Are the Village Green Preservation Society
- Released: 22 November 1968
- Recorded: 29 March 1968
- Studio: Pye, London
- Genre: Rock
- Length: 2:33
- Label: Pye
- Songwriter: Ray Davies
- Producer: Ray Davies

Official audio
- "Johnny Thunder" on YouTube

"Johnny Thunder" is a song by the English rock band the Kinks from their sixth studio album, The Kinks Are the Village Green Preservation Society (1968). Written and sung by Ray Davies, the song was recorded in March 1968. Davies was inspired to write the song after seeing the 1953 film The Wild One, basing it on Marlon Brando's character Johnny as well as on a classmate Davies admired as a child. A rock song, its recording features a countermelody played by Dave Davies on electric guitar, wordless vocal harmonies and one of the album's few instances of a single-tracked vocal by Ray.

"Johnny Thunder" is one of several character studies on Village Green. The lyrics describe a motorbike rider who rebels against conformity while surviving on a diet of water and lightning. Ray expressed desires publicly and privately to Pete Townshend that the Who cover the song, and Dave later suggested Townshend incorporated the song's opening riff into his songwriting. John Genzale of New York Dolls used the song's title for his stage name, Johnny Thunders.

== Background and composition ==
["Johnny Thunder" is a composite character based] on two people I knew. [One was] someone I didn't want to fall out with. He was a bit older than I was at school, a complete hero, he was an outsider as well, the rebel. There's still part that character that drives me. Johnny Thunder is somebody I still look up to, I changed his real name, but Johnny Thunder seemed to be a great idea.

– Ray Davies, 2009

Ray Davies composed "Johnny Thunder" after watching László Benedek's 1953 film The Wild One, which had been banned by British censors until February 1968. Described by Dave Davies in an August 1968 interview as "the local hound" and "[a] real swine", the song's lead character is a motorbike rider and an enemy of conformity who survives on a diet of water and lightning, seen by author Barry J. Faulk as a clichéd notion of a rebel.

The Johnny Thunder character is based in part on someone Ray Davies admired while in school, leading authors Rob Jovanovic and Johnny Rogan to describe the song as a rewrite of his similarly themed 1967 composition "David Watts". The character is also based on The Wild One's lead character Johnny, as played by Marlon Brando, a misunderstood biker questioned by others as to what he has to rebel against. Author Andy Miller thinks the name Johnny Thunder is a variation on Marlon Brando, while Rogan suggests Davies may have drawn it from the comic book hero of the same name, who had been reintroduced into the Justice Society of America in April 1965. (Note: Ray Davies reintroduced the character in the single "One of the Survivors" from the Kinks' 1973 album Preservation Act 1.)

A rock song, "Johnny Thunder" represents one of several character studies which appear on The Kinks Are the Village Green Preservation Society. Author Thomas M. Kitts connects the song thematically to other characters on the album who try to slow down or reject time altogether, like in the songs "Sitting by the Riverside" and "Wicked Annabella".

== Recording and release ==
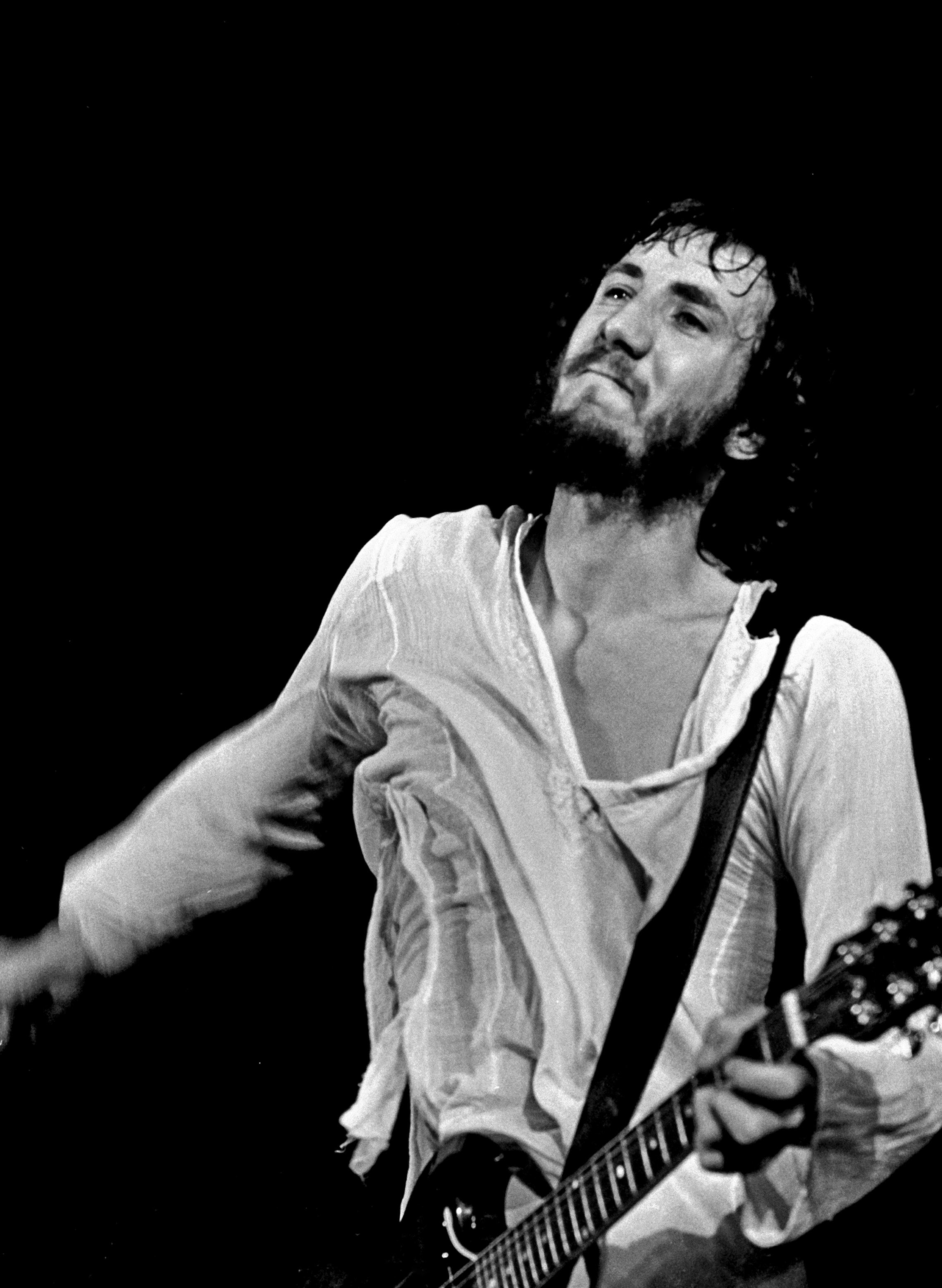
Ray Davies expressed a desire to Pete Townshend (pictured 1972) that the Who cover the song.

The Kinks recorded "Johnny Thunder" on 29 March 1968 in Pye Studio 2, one of two basement studios at Pye Records' London offices. Davies is credited as the song's producer, while Pye's in-house engineer Alan "Mac" MacKenzie operated the four-track mixing console. The song's production is simple, joining acoustic guitars, bass and drums with an electric guitar contribution by Dave Davies, who plays a countermelody low in the mix. The backing vocals are wordless and imitate the sound of a brass section, while it is one of the few instances on the album of Ray Davies's lead vocal not being double tracked.

"Johnny Thunder" was among the songs Davies sent to Reprise Records in mid-1968 for Four More Respected Gentlemen, a US-only album planned for late 1968, though the LP was aborted before its release. He included the song on the original twelve-track edition of Village Green and retained its sequencing as the album's fourth track when he expanded the track listing to fifteen songs. Pye released the fifteen-track edition in the UK on 22 November 1968. In a retrospective assessment, Rogan describes the song as a "fine tune", finding its vocal harmonies and arrangement as particular strengths.

Davies expressed his desire in a November 1970 interview with Rolling Stone magazine that the English rock band the Who cover the song and personally phoned Pete Townshend to raise the possibility. (Note: Asked about the call decades later, Townshend could not recall exactly when it took place, but Rogan suggests it was likely "some time after" Village Green's November 1968 release.) Townshend admitted to basing the Who's first hit, "I Can't Explain" (1965), on the Kinks' earliest singles, and Dave Davies later suggested that Townshend also incorporated the opening riff of "Johnny Thunder" into his songwriting. While Davies did not explicitly state where Townshend co-opted the riff, Miller later compared it to parts of "Overture" and "Go to the Mirror!" from the Who's May 1969 album Tommy, and Morgan Enos of Billboard likened the fast strumming to "Go to the Mirror!" and "Pinball Wizard". The song also influenced John Genzale of the 1970s American rock band New York Dolls, who in his late teens took his stage name Johnny Thunders from the song.
