= Ducks on the Wall =

Single by The Kinks

from the album Soap Opera
- B-side: "Rush Hour Blues"
- Released: 18 April 1975
- Length: 3:12
- Label: RCA
- Songwriter: Ray Davies
- Producer: Ray Davies

The Kinks singles chronology
"Holiday Romance" (1974)	"Ducks on the Wall" (1975)	"You Can't Stop the Music" (1975)

"Ducks on the Wall" is a song by the British rock band the Kinks. The song, appearing on the band's 1975 album Soap Opera, was written by the band's principal songwriter, Ray Davies.

== Lyrics and music ==
The lyrics of "Ducks on the Wall" relate the singer's (Starmaker) dismay at his wife's love for her decorative ducks which she hangs on the wall. Ray Davies' biographer Thomas M. Kitts describes the song as being in the vein of Davies' sexual humor, as with songs such as "Lola" and "When I Turn Off the Living Room Light". Kitts describes the music as "1950s rock and roll." Montreal Gazette critic Bill Mann remarked on the song's humor, particularly highlighting the line "I love you, baby but I can't ball / When I see those ducks on the wall."

Kinks' drummer Mick Avory's quacking noises on the song represent his only released vocal contribution to a Kinks song (although he did sing a song called "Lilacs and Daffodils" in the Face to Face sessions).

== Release ==
"Ducks on the Wall" was first released as the follow-up single to "Holiday Romance" (both of which would appear on the Soap Opera album). However, like "Holiday Romance" before it, the single did not chart. It was included on the Soap Opera album, but not in the Star Maker teleplay on which the album was based. Davies had wanted to include "Ducks on the Wall" in the teleplay but was forced to edit it out so reduce the length of the teleplay and because the producers felt that the visual effects Davies planned of breaking the ducks up was too violent.

"Ducks on the Wall" also appeared in May 1975 on Soap Opera, where it was the tenth track in the line-up.

== Reception ==
NME said of the single release that "Ducks on the Wall" has a weak tune and unsubtle satire, but praised the guitar and piano parts. Melody Maker panned the song, stating that the "Kinks come back with a lame duck." On the other hand music critic Dave Lewis' contemporary review of the single found it to be "witty and tuneful," saying that "it starts off with a quack and then breaks into a rollicking boogie."

Rolling Stone critic John Mendelsohn called it an "otherwise undistinguished Larry Williams-derived rocker" but claimed that it had the "funniest first line in the history of Western pop music in 'My baby's got the most deplorable taste." Music critic Johnny Rogan called it an "amusing rock 'n' roll romp complete with duck noises," comparing it to the music of 10cc and concluding that it was the most commercial song on the Soap Opera album. Kitts called it a "comic gem." Kinks' biographer Nick Hasted described it as "the funniest lyric" on the album, comparing the protagonist's nightmare of the ducks coming after him to "a suburban variant on Hitchcock's birds." Hartford Courant critic Henry McNulty called it a "standout cut" on Soap Opera, saying that "it's a real rocker and behind the crashing guitars of Dave Davies and drums of Mick Avory is a sort of electronic quacking that adds to the general absurdity." Boston Globe critic Nathan Cobb called it "an absolute gem, a hilarious poke at middle class values."

"Ducks on the Wall" was chosen as a highlight from Soap Opera by Stephen Thomas Erlewine of AllMusic.

Kink guitarist Dave Davies considered "Ducks on the Wall" to be one of the "best-realized songs" on Soap Opera.
