= Drivin' (The Kinks song) =

- French picture sleeve

Single by the Kinks

from the album Arthur (Or the Decline and Fall of the British Empire)
- B-side: "Mindless Child of Motherhood"
- Released: 20 June 1969
- Recorded: May 1969
- Studio: Pye, London
- Genre: Pop rock; music hall
- Label: Pye
- Songwriter: Ray Davies
- Producer: Ray Davies

The Kinks UK singles chronology
"Plastic Man" (1969)	"Drivin'" (1969)	"Shangri-La" (1969)

Arthur (Or the Decline and Fall of the British Empire) track listing
- 12 tracks Side one: 1. "Victoria"; 2. "Yes Sir, No Sir"; 3. "Some Mother's Son"; 4. "Drivin'"; 5. "Brainwashed"; 6. "Australia"; Side two: 7. "Shangri-La"; 8. "Mr. Churchill Says"; 9. "She's Bought a Hat Like Princess Marina"; 10. "Young and Innocent Days"; 11. "Nothing to Say"; 12. "Arthur"

"Drivin'" is a song written by Ray Davies of the Kinks which appeared on that group's 1969 concept album Arthur (Or the Decline and Fall of the British Empire). It was released in the UK as the first single from the album, but failed to chart.

== Background ==
"Drivin'", on 1 May 1969, was one of the first two tracks to be worked on by the Kinks for the new album (the other being its B-side, "Mindless Child of Motherhood"). In Arthur (Or the Decline and Fall of the British Empire), "Drivin'" shows the protagonist, Arthur Morgan, convincing his wife, Rose, to forget all of her problems (and the upheaval going on in the world) and take a drive. However, within the context of the concept album, the song offers only a brief respite from the prevailing anxieties.

According to critic Johnny Rogan and author Thomas Kitts, "Drivin'" is based on real experiences from Ray Davies' childhood when his family drove from London to the country.

== Release and reception ==
"Drivin'" was the first single from Arthur. Released in the UK and continental Europe (but not the US), it did not chart at all, making it the first song by the Kinks (aside from their pre-"You Really Got Me" singles) to do so. Dave Davies said of the track, "[It] was a compromise record, it wasn't that bold." The follow-up single, "Shangri-La", also didn't make a dent in the charts.

The track appeared on the compilation album Picture Book.

The song was praised by AllMusic's Stephen Thomas Erlewine for its "lazy grace". Rogan praises its "convincing lyrics", "sumptuous melody" and the "amusing percussive touches" added by Kinks' drummer Mick Avory towards the end of the song. Kitts comments that the song's rhythm, as well as some of the guitar playing by Ray's brother Dave Davies, effectively simulates a "leisurely car ride up and down hills and around curves".

== Personnel ==
According to band researcher Doug Hinman:

The Kinks

- Ray Davies – lead vocal; acoustic and electric guitars; organ
- Dave Davies – backing vocal, electric guitar
- John Dalton – bass guitar
- Mick Avory – drums

Additional musician

- Rasa Davies – backing vocal

== "Mindless Child of Motherhood" ==
The B-side, "Mindless Child of Motherhood", was a Dave Davies composition, written for an unreleased solo album. It was later released on the 1998 reissue of Arthur.
