= Sitting in My Hotel =

- German cover

Single by The Kinks

from the album Everybody's in Show-Biz
- A-side: "Sweet Lady Genevieve"
- Released: September 21, 1973
- Recorded: May–June 1972 at Morgan Studios, Willesden, London
- Genre: Rock
- Length: 3:40
- Label: RCA 2418 (U.K.); RCA 74-16381 (Germany)
- Songwriter: Ray Davies
- Producer: Ray Davies

"Sitting in My Hotel" is a song written by Ray Davies that was first released on the Kinks' 1972 album Everybody's in Show-Biz. It was also released on several compilation albums and as the B-side of the "Sweet Lady Genevieve" single. It is one of Davies' more introspective songs, musing about the cost of fame and stardom, and thus contributes to the album's theme of the difficulties of life on the road.

== Lyrics and music ==
The theme of "Sitting in My Hotel" is the loneliness produced by stardom. According to Davies, the key line in the song is the oft-repeated line "if my friends could see me now." Davies wonders in the song what his old friends would think of him and his life now that he is wealthy and famous. The lyrics suggest that now that he is wealthy and famous, he has lost some of his identity, particularly his link to his working-class roots. Davies comments on his outlandish stage costumes and performance style, referring to himself as an "outrageous poove", and notes his attempts to avoid responsibility. He also questions whether his work is meaningful, from both a cultural and personal perspective. The cultural perspective is referred to in the line about "writing songs for old time vaudeville revues", which has a particularly personal resonance given the criticism Davies and the Kinks received for performing music hall songs instead of the rock songs fans and critics expected. The personal perspective is reflected in the question which ends the song, asking "what's it all leading to?"

Davies has stated about the song that "We had all the trappings of that success around us, but there I was, in the middle of it all, asking the question 'Who am I?' I was really concerned about who I was. So the hotel was just a symbol for my isolation. The song ought to be subtitled 'Who am I trying to kid?'" The song doesn't only reflect Ray Davies' feelings, but those of the other band members as well. Kinks guitarist Dave Davies has stated that "it doesn't matter how luxurious your surroundings are, you go back to your hotel room and it is like a prison. We used to do 11, 12, 13 month tours of America and leave our families at home because we couldn't afford to bring them over. It was hell."

The primary instrumentation is John Gosling's piano. Gosling also plays Hammond organ. Other instruments include Ray Davies on acoustic guitar, Dave Davies on electric guitar, John Dalton on bass guitar, Mick Avory on drums and Mike Cotton on trumpet. Ray Davies sings the lead vocal with Dave Davies providing backup vocals. Music critic Johnny Rogan describes the melody as "charming", and Rolling Stone critic Bob Palmer describes it as "beautiful".

== Reception ==
Music critic Johnny Rogan regards "Sitting in My Hotel" one of the two or three indispensable songs on Everybody's in Show-Biz, describing the lyrics as "thoughtful", "self-deprecating" and "self-analytical". Rolling Stone critic Bob Palmer calls the song "a bona fide Kinks Klassic, dreamily wistful with a beautiful melody and featuring 'the exquisite Mr. John Gosling at the pianoforte.'" Ole Jacob Hoel of Adresseavisen described it and "Celluloid Heroes", also from Everybody's in Show-Biz as "two of history's finest pop songs." However, music critic John Mendelsohn finds a note of self-pity in Davies singing about "how used he feels." Kinks' pianist Gosling considers "Sitting in My Hotel" to be "really good", despite not being as impressed with most of the songs on Everybody's in Show-Biz.

== Other appearances ==
Subsequent to its initial appearance on Everybody's in Show-Biz, "Sitting in My Hotel" was included on several Kinks' compilation albums, including The Kinks' Greatest: Celluloid Heroes and Picture Book. In 1973 it was released as the B-side of the Kinks' single "Sweet Lady Genevieve" in Europe.
