= Everybody's a Star (Starmaker) =

Single by The Kinks

from the album Soap Opera
- B-side: "Ordinary People"
- Released: April 1975
- Recorded: August – October 1974 at Konk Studios, London
- Genre: Rock
- Length: 2:57
- Label: RCA
- Songwriter: Ray Davies
- Producer: Ray Davies

The Kinks singles chronology
"Holiday Romance" (1974)	"Everybody's a Star (Starmaker)" (1975)	"Ducks on the Wall" (1975)

"Everybody's a Star (Starmaker)" is the opening track on the Kinks' poorly received 1975 concept album, Soap Opera. It was written by the Kinks' primary songwriter, Ray Davies.

== Lyrics and music ==
Like the two albums of the Preservation rock opera before it and Schoolboys in Disgrace after it, Soap Opera follows a storyline throughout the album. In "Everybody's a Star (Starmaker)", Ray Davies portrays the main character of the album, Starmaker. Starmaker describes himself as "a creator, inventor and innovator" who watches "the ordinary people, no matter what [their] occupation is." He goes on to say that "everybody's a celebrity, and we've all got personality and individuality. We all read lines, and we all act a part, we all need a script and an audience to play to. No matter what you do, or who you are, everybody's a star." He also claims that he "can turn the most ordinary man in the world into a star," "no matter how dull or simple" he is.

According to Rolling Stone critic John Mendelsohn, the music is based on a rhythm guitar riff similar to that of the Who's "I Can't Explain". The track opens with a guitar, and goes on to have a short guitar solo later in the song. It also features female vocalists in the background (like many other songs that the Kinks recorded in their theatrical phase).

== Release and reception ==
One month prior to its release on the Soap Opera album, "Everybody's a Star (Starmaker)" was released as the only American single from Soap Opera in April 1975 and it was backed with "Ordinary People" (the track that follows "Everybody's a Star (Starmaker)" on Soap Opera). It did not chart. However, the single edit appeared as a bonus track on the 1998 CD version of Soap Opera. In June 1975 it was re-mixed in a slightly speeded up version for possible release as a single in the UK, but although it was promoted to UK radio stations the single was never released there.

Mendelsohn described Dave Davies' guitar solo as being one of his "most exciting and proficient" and said that some of the dialogue was entertaining, but felt that the song was "injudiciously elongated." AllMusic cited the track as a highlight from Soap Opera. Cash Box called it "an infectious British rockin' tune whose narrator claims the unique ability to make anyone into a star" with "super horn, rhythm, lead and backup vocal arrangements." Cash Box and Billboard both considered it one of the best songs on Soap Opera. Music journalist Denise Sullivan felt that "Everybody's a Star (Starmaker)" "has the same pomp and swagger as the best glam tracks from the era," citing T. Rex's "20th Century Boy", David Bowie's "Diamond Dogs" and Roxy Music's "Prairie Rose" as examples. Kinks' biographer Rob Jovanovic similarly described it as having "Bowie-glam promise" but criticized the production for overly being too "brass-heavy." Music critic Johnny Rogan summed up his review of the song stating that it contained "elements of the old Kinks' rock/R&B sound here emerging from behind the expected brass backing." Hartford Courant critic Henry McNulty called it an "excellent rocker," saying that "although it starts with some guitar licks borrowed (or stolen) from the Who, it soon falls into the classic Kinks mold, with Ray Davies wonderful sappy voice floating above the instruments like a dead goldfish in a bowl." Thanet Times and East Kent Pictorial stated that the song recaptures "the old Kinks sound."

== Other appearances ==
"Everybody's a Star (Starmaker)" has been used in advertisements for Converse sneakers.
