= Party Line (The Kinks song) =

- Norwegian single picture sleeve

Song by the Kinks

from the album Face to Face
- Released: 28 October 1966
- Recorded: 11 or 12 April 1966
- Genre: Garage rock
- Length: 2:38
- Label: Pye
- Songwriters: Ray Davies, Dave Davies
- Producer: Shel Talmy

The Kinks European singles chronology
| "Sunny Afternoon" (1966) | "Dandy" / "Party Line" (1966) | "Dead End Street" (1966) |

"Party Line" is the opening track from the Kinks' 1966 album, Face to Face. The songwriting is credited to Ray Davies. On one of the earliest covers of the album (CVPV 76032.30), the song is credited R.Davies - D.Davies.

== Background ==
On every release of "Party Line", the song is said to be written by Ray Davies, the main songwriter of the Kinks. However, in his critically acclaimed autobiography Kink, Dave Davies (who also sang "Party Line") claimed that he had written the song rather than Ray. Dave Davies has said, "On 'Party Line' I got really stuck for lyrics; I just didn't know what to write. And Ray and I got together and busted out a few things on the piano and got a lot of ideas for it. So he helped me with the lyrics on that." However, Rob Jovanovic, author of God Save The Kinks: A Biography, wrote that "Party Line" was co-written between both Davies brothers. It bears mentioning that on the Face to Face LP, the band's sixth US album on the Reprise label, the song is credited to both.

The opening of the track (a man answering a telephone) is a remnant from the early stages of the Face to Face album, where the songs were to be linked by sound effects (other songs, such as "Holiday in Waikiki" and "Rainy Day in June", also have these sound effects). The man answering the phone in the sound effect is Grenville Collins, one of the band's managers at the time.

== Lyrics and music ==
The lyrics of "Party Line", the singer complains about being on a party line, with lyrics like "I can't speak without an interception / This is private, please get off my line / Please tell me when I can have my privacy / I'd like to meet the girl who's always talking / when I'm speaking on my party line". He says that he's "wonderin' all the time who's on the other end," and asking himself, "Is she big, is she small? Is she a she at all? Who's on my party line?" He goes on to say, "Wish I had a more direct connection / This party line was here when I arrived / And I'm not voting in the next election / If they don't do something about finding out / The person who is on my party line".

The track opens with a sound effect of a telephone ringing and being answered. Unusually for the band, the lead vocals are done by Dave Davies, with Ray singing harmony.

== Release and reception ==
"Party Line" saw release in October 1966 as the first song on Face to Face. That same month, in several European countries, it was released as the B-side of the "Dandy" single, which found success in multiple countries. In a few countries, such as Norway, "Party Line" switched sides with "Dandy", making it the A-side.

"Party Line" has generally received positive feedback from critics. Stephen Thomas Erlewine called the track a "classic". Andrew Hickey wrote in his book, Preservation: The Kinks' Music 1964 - 1974, that "Party Line" is "easily the best opener by The Kinks [on any album before and including Face to Face]."

== Sources ==
- Hinman, Doug (2004). The Kinks: All Day and All of the Night: Day-by-Day Concerts, Recordings and Broadcasts, 1961–1996. San Francisco, California: Backbeat Books. ISBN 978-0-87930-765-3.
