= Plastic Man (song) =

- Dutch picture sleeve

Single by the Kinks
- B-side: "King Kong"
- Released: 28 March 1969
- Recorded: March 1969
- Studio: Pye, London
- Genre: Pop
- Length: 3:04
- Label: Pye
- Songwriter: Ray Davies
- Producer: Ray Davies

The Kinks UK singles chronology
| "Days" (1968) | "Plastic Man" (1969) | "Drivin'" (1969) |

"Plastic Man" is a song written by Ray Davies and recorded by the Kinks in 1969.

It was written and recorded specifically as an attempt at a hit single, released only days after being recorded. The previous year had been commercially disastrous for the Kinks. Their two singles had failed to reach the top 10 in the UK and failed to chart at all in the US. The album The Kinks Are the Village Green Preservation Society had also failed to chart in both the UK and US.

== History ==
The plan for a hit backfired when the use of the word 'bum' (in the line "...plastic legs that reach up to his plastic bum") meant that the BBC refused to play the song. The single only managed to reach No. 31 in the UK and the following two Kinks singles failed to chart altogether.

The single was not initially released in the US, and remained unreleased there until The Great Lost Kinks Album in 1973.

Both sides of the single were the final songs to be recorded with founding bassist Pete Quaife and therefore is the last recorded single with the original Kinks line-up, although many Quaife-era Kinks songs have been released since his departure. Shortly after the release of the single, Quaife quit the group; he was replaced by John Dalton, who had substituted for him from June to October 1966 after Quaife was injured in a car accident. Quaife stated in 1998 that "Plastic Man" was his least favourite song that he recorded with the Kinks.

== "King Kong" ==
The B-side, "King Kong", was an "echo-drenched heavy blues" song exclusive to this single, and was unavailable in the US until the release of the US compilation The Kink Kronikles. It has been said that the music publisher Eddie Kassner, with whom Davies had a "long-running dispute", was the basis of the song.

== Legacy ==
Both sides of the single (as well as a stereo version of the A-side) are included as bonus tracks on the CD reissue of Arthur (Or the Decline and Fall of the British Empire). In 2004, the B-side appeared on the three-disc Deluxe Edition of The Kinks Are The Village Green Preservation Society, while in 2011, both the mono and stereo mixes of the A-side appeared on the Deluxe Edition of Arthur.

== Personnel ==
According to band researcher Doug Hinman:

- Ray Davies – lead vocal, electric guitar
- Dave Davies – backing vocal, electric guitar
- Pete Quaife – backing vocal, bass
- Mick Avory – backing vocal, drums
