= Mirror of Love =

Single by The Kinks

from the album Preservation Act 2
- B-side: "Cricket" (UK)
- Released: 5 April 1974 (UK)
- Recorded: January – March 1974 at Konk Studios, London
- Genre: Rock, Dixieland
- Length: 3:26
- Label: RCA 5015
- Songwriter: Ray Davies
- Producer: Ray Davies

The Kinks singles chronology
"Where Have All the Good Times Gone" (1973)	"Mirror of Love" (1974)	"Mirror of Love" (1974)

"Mirror of Love" is a track from the Kinks' theatrical album, Preservation Act 2. It was written by Ray Davies. It was released as the debut single from Preservation Act 2 in the UK only, but a version that was rerecorded for the American release was released as a single in both America and Britain.

== Lyrics and music ==
"Mirror of Love" makes use of a New Orleans jazz, with Ray Davies on the majority of the instruments on the album/UK single version (guitar, piano and drums) with the only other people playing on the song being Dave Davies on mandolin as well as horns. Like many tracks of the era, Davies is singing as one of the characters in the Preservation storyline. This time he portrays Belle, who is the lover of Flash (the main character of the Preservation saga), who complains of Flash's cruel treatment toward her (for example, she says that Flash would "slap [her] down, treat [her] bad".) However, "through the mirror of love" she still loves him, with Belle calling him her "dream lover", saying that she "would kill for" him.

== Reception ==
"Mirror of Love" was one of the more positively reviewed tracks from the Preservation saga. Andrew Hickey wrote in his book Preservation: The Kinks Music 1964-1974 that "musically, the song is a rather good effort at trad jazz" and that it is "a simple but effective song". He also claimed that "[Ray] Davies' vocals are probably his best on the album, with some wonderful jumps into a trilling falsetto a la Rudy Valee" and went on to say that it "is easily the best track on the album". Jason Josephes of Pitchfork Media called "Mirror of Love" "a psychedelic Dixieland number that could have only sprouted from the whimsical noggin of Ray Davies." AllMusic cited the track as a highlight from the album. Cash Box said that there are "lots of odd sounds going on here to capture that Preservation sound, but all are infectious and totally entertaining."

The song also received a positive review in the NME from Chrissie Hynde, who would later form the Pretenders and cover Kinks songs "Stop Your Sobbing" and "I Go to Sleep".

== Rerecorded version ==
"Mirror of Love"

Single by The Kinks
- B-side: "He's Evil"
- Released: 26 July 1974
- Recorded: Konk Studios, London
- Length: 3:29

The Kinks singles chronology
"Mirror of Love" (1974)	"Mirror of Love" (1974)	"Holiday Romance" (1974)

Although the original album version was released as a single in Britain, it was rerecorded with the rest of the band participating for the track's single release in the United States. It was not successful (it did not chart in either Britain or America), but this version was released as a bonus track on the Velvel reissue of Preservation Act 2 (as well as the outtake "Slum Kids"). Andrew Hickey said that this version and the original edit "differ in a few points of arrangement and vocal performance, but are very similar". This version also appeared on Picture Book.
