= Soap Opera (album) =

Studio album by the Kinks
- Released: 25 April 1975 (US), 16 May 1975 (UK)
- Recorded: August – October 1974
- Studio: Konk, London
- Genre: Glam rock
- Length: 37:30
- Label: RCA
- Producer: Ray Davies

The Kinks chronology
Preservation Act 2 (1974)	Soap Opera (1975)	Schoolboys in Disgrace (1975)

Singles from Soap Opera
- 1. "Holiday Romance" Released: 11 October 1974 (UK); 2. "Everybody's a Star (Starmaker)" Released: April 1975 (US); 3. "Ducks on the Wall" Released: 18 April 1975 (UK); 4. "You Can't Stop the Music" Released: 23 May 1975 (UK)

Professional ratings
Review scores
Source	Rating
Allmusic	1/5 stars
Blender	1/5 stars
Christgau's Record Guide	C+
Rolling Stone	(unfavourable)

Soap Opera, or The Kinks Present a Soap Opera, is a 1975 concept album by the Kinks. It is the fourteenth studio album by the Kinks.

== Development ==
The material was initially developed for a Granada TV live teleplay in 1974, which was broadcast under the title Star Maker, starring Ray Davies and June Ritchie as the leads, with the Kinks providing live accompaniment. A Soap Opera adapted the same songs and plot to an audio presentation, with Ritchie in the same role. Plans for a full-scale theatrical tour were not realised, but the Kinks, with their extended mid-70s lineup, did perform the entire album on tour in 1975. Though the album was not well-received, Dave Thompson, reviewing an unofficial bootleg recording, called the live presentation "a revelation".

== Plot ==
Soap Opera is the third concept album in the band's "theatrical period". It tells the story of a musician named Starmaker who changes places with an "ordinary man" named Norman to better understand life. Starmaker beds Norman's wife Andrea and then goes to work the next day, getting caught in the rush hour. He works 9 to 5 and then visits the pub for a few drinks before making his way home. Andrea greets him, and he tells her she is "making it all worthwhile". By this point, Starmaker has lost his grip on reality; he doesn't know who he is anymore. In the end, he settles down with Andrea, accepting that he is now just "a face in the crowd". The album concludes with the sentiment that, although rock stars may fade, their music lives on.

The Starmaker is an exaggerated characterization of Ray Davies. He would often use his name in the stage version of Soap Opera and perform previous hit Kinks songs as examples of his work as a star to explain that he is not actually the "ordinary" Norman.

=== "Holiday Romance" ===
The song was written by Ray Davies and released as a British and Japanese single in October 1974. Backed with "Shepherds of the Nation" from the band's 1974 album Preservation Act 2, the single was a flop, not charting in any countries.

Music critic Dave Lewis' contemporary review of the single said that "Davies's camp, Palm Court vocals are matched perfectly by the careful string arrangements, making the tune simple, catchy and amusing – in fact, everything a good pop song should be." Rolling Stone critic John Mendelsohn said that it was "ultra music hall-ish" and the only Kinks' song with pizzicato strings, and said that it "serves as delightful proof that Ray hadn't completely lost his knack for telling a story in a single song". Kinks' biographer Rob Jovanovic described "Holiday Romance" as being "catchy but incredibly twee". Kinks' biographer Nick Hasted described it as "a thirties pastiche tale with an archly acted, eventually addictive vocal". Music critic Johnny Rogan summed up his review of the song stating that "Ray sings the composition in his Noël Coward voice with a sumptuous backing that works quite well." Boston Globe critic Nathan Cobb described it as a "kind of British 'Blue Hawaii' fantasy number".

Kink guitarist Dave Davies considered "Holiday Romance" to be one of the "best-realized songs" on Soap Opera.

== Tributes ==
In 1994 Moog Konttinen recorded a Finnish translation of the album as Saippuaooppera.

== Track listing ==
All tracks are written by Ray Davies.

Side one
No.	Title	Length
1.	"Everybody's a Star (Starmaker)"	2:57
2.	"Ordinary People"	3:49
3.	"Rush Hour Blues"	4:27
4.	"Nine to Five"	1:48
5.	"When Work Is Over"	2:06
6.	"Have Another Drink"	2:41

Side two
No.	Title	Length
1.	"Underneath the Neon Sign"	3:53
2.	"Holiday Romance"	3:10
3.	"You Make It All Worthwhile"	3:49
4.	"Ducks on the Wall"	3:20
5.	"(A) Face in the Crowd"	2:17
6.	"You Can't Stop the Music"	3:12

1998 CD reissue bonus tracks
No.	Title	Length
13.	"Everybody's a Star (Starmaker)" (single version)	2:54
14.	"Ordinary People" (live)	3:44
15.	"You Make It All Worthwhile" (live)	4:17
16.	"Underneath the Neon Sign" (live)	4:05

== Personnel ==
The Kinks

- Ray Davies – vocals, guitar
- Dave Davies – guitar, vocals
- John Dalton – bass
- Mick Avory – drums
- John Gosling – keyboards

Additional personnel

- June Ritchie – vocals of "Andrea" ("Norman"'s wife)

Technical

- Roger Beale – engineer
- Joe Petagno – illustration
- Pat Doyle – art direction
