= Preservation Act 2 =

Studio album by the Kinks
- Released: 8 May 1974
- Recorded: January–March 1974
- Studio: Konk, London
- Genre: Rock
- Length: 67:00
- Label: RCA
- Producer: Ray Davies

The Kinks chronology
Preservation Act 1 (1973)	Preservation Act 2 (1974)	Soap Opera (1975)

Singles from Preservation Act 2
- 1. "Money Talks" Released: April 1974 (US); 2. "Mirror of Love" Released: 5 April 1974 (UK); 3. "Mirror of Love (Band version)" Released: 26 July 1974

Professional ratings
Review scores
Source	Rating
Allmusic	1.5/5 stars
Christgau's Record Guide	B−
Encyclopedia of Popular Music	2/5 stars
The Great Rock Discography	3/10
Pitchfork	9.5/10

Preservation Act 2 is a 1974 concept album by the English rock band the Kinks, and their thirteenth studio album. It sold poorly (peaking on the Billboard Top LPs & Tape chart at No. 114), and received a mixed response among critics. Ken Emerson, in Rolling Stone, held up the album as an "underrated" one in the Kinks' repertoire.

The live performances of the material were much better received, with one critic going so far as to say that the Preservation shows were the first successful fusion of rock and roll with theater: "Ray Davies has finally pulled it off— the Kinks-based theatrical production of Preservation is a great rock concert and a perfectly coordinated musical."

Some later critics have panned the album: The A.V. Club described it as "sprawling... with its radio announcements and melodramatic, sub-Andrew Lloyd Webber musical numbers, is a wash, the sound of a once-great band losing the plot." AllMusic referred to it as "a mess, an impenetrable jumble of story, theater, instrumentals, 'announcements,' unfinished ideas, guest singers, and, on occasion, a song or two."

The 1991 CD reissue on Rhino was a two-CD set combining Preservation Act 2 with its 1973 predecessor Preservation Act 1, but with no bonus tracks. The 1998 CD reissue of Act 2 on Velvel featured the outtake "Slum Kids", a popular live piece for the Kinks.

== Track listing ==
All tracks are written by Ray Davies.

Side one
No.	Title	Length
1.	"Announcement"	0:41
2.	"Introduction to Solution"	2:43
3.	"When a Solution Comes"	3:40
4.	"Money Talks"	3:44
5.	"Announcement"	0:55
6.	"Shepherds of the Nation"	4:17

Side two
No.	Title	Length
1.	"Scum of the Earth"	2:45
2.	"Second-Hand Car Spiv"	4:01
3.	"He's Evil"	4:25
4.	"Mirror of Love"	3:26
5.	"Announcement"	0:34

Side three
No.	Title	Length
1.	"Nobody Gives"	6:33
2.	"Oh Where Oh Where Is Love?"	3:40
3.	"Flash's Dream (The Final Elbow)"	4:17
4.	"Flash's Confession"	4:06

Side four
No.	Title	Length
1.	"Nothing Lasts Forever"	3:42
2.	"Announcement"	0:20
3.	"Artificial Man"	5:30
4.	"Scrapheap City"	3:16
5.	"Announcement"	1:05
6.	"Salvation Road"	3:20

CD reissue bonus tracks
No.	Title	Length
22.	"Mirror of Love" (Alternate mix)	3:29
23.	"Slum Kids" (Take 1)	6:27

== Personnel ==
The Kinks

- Ray Davies – vocals, guitar
- Dave Davies – guitar, vocals
- John Dalton – bass
- Mick Avory – drums
- John Gosling – keyboards

Additional personnel

- Maryann Price, Angi Girton, Pamela Travis, Sue Brown – vocals
- Christopher Timothy – "announcer" voice (chosen to mimic his adverts for The Sun)
- Chris Musk – "reporter at meeting" voice
- Alan Holmes – baritone saxophone, clarinet
- Laurie Brown – trumpet, flute, tenor saxophone
- John Beecham – trombone, flute

Technical

- Roger Beale – engineer
- Pat Doyle – art direction
- Bob Searles – design
- Jerry Preston – illustration
