= Dandy (song) =

1966 single by The Kinks

- West German picture sleeve

Single by the Kinks

from the album Face to Face
- B-side: "Party Line"
- Released: Late 1966 (Note: The single's earliest European chart appearance was on the Dutch Veronica Top 40 for the week ending 8 October 1966.)
- Recorded: 9 June 1966
- Studio: Pye, London
- Genre: Pop
- Length: 2:10
- Label: Pye
- Songwriter: Ray Davies
- Producer: Shel Talmy

The Kinks European singles chronology
| "Sunny Afternoon" (1966) | "Dandy" (1966) | "Dead End Street" (1966) |

"Dandy" is a 1966 song by the Kinks, appearing on their album Face to Face.

== Release and reception ==
Our two biggest mistakes were not putting out "[A] Well Respected Man" or "Dandy" as singles. We released "Dandy" in Germany and it sold tremendously well there – it had been released as a single all over the continent, but not of course, here [in Britain].

— Ray Davies, February 1967

"Dandy" was only released in Britain and America on the Face to Face album. However, it was released as a single in continental Europe, where it charted, reaching No. 1 in Germany, No. 2 in Belgium No. 3 in the Netherlands and No. 6 in Austria. In some countries, (such as Norway) "Dandy" was flipped with "Party Line" (also from Face to Face) as the A-side.

AllMusic's Stewart Mason said of "Dandy" that "Davies delivers the lyrics, about a neighborhood lothario, with just the right mixture of disgust and admiration; his slyly witty vocals are truly what makes the song. Musically, the tune harks back to the music hall tradition of George Formby; Dave Davies' guitar is so trebly and clean that it sounds like a ukulele – or perhaps an electrified rubber band – and the gently swinging tune sounds like it could have been an old vaudeville hit. 'Dandy' is a charming, slightly subversive, gem." Stephen Thomas Erlewine, also from AllMusic, noted "the music hall shuffle of 'Dandy'" as a "wonderful moment" from Face to Face.

"Dandy" was a regular feature of the Kinks live act from 1966 to 1969 but was dropped thereafter.

== Cover versions ==
=== Herman's Hermits ===
"Dandy"
- US picture sleeve

Single by Herman's Hermits

from the album There's a Kind of Hush All Over the World
- B-side: "My Reservation's Been Confirmed"
- Released: September 1966
- Recorded: August 1966
- Studio: De Lane Lea, London
- Genre: Pop
- Label: MGM
- Songwriter: Ray Davies
- Producer: Mickie Most

Herman's Hermits singles chronology
| "This Door Swings Both Ways" (1966) | "Dandy" (1966) | "East West" (1966) |

"Dandy" became a hit single in North America in 1966 as recorded by fellow UK group Herman's Hermits in that same time frame, reaching No. 1 in Canada on the RPM national singles chart and No. 5 in the US on the Billboard Hot 100. It also made No. 3 in New Zealand. This version was not released as a single in the UK.

When comparing the Kinks' original version of "Dandy" to Herman's Hermits' cover, Stewart Mason of AllMusic said, "Herman's Hermits would have the US hit with Ray Davies' 'Dandy,' but the Kinks' own version, from 1966's masterful Face To Face, is far superior to Peter Noone's charming but gormless rendition." Cash Box called the Herman's Hermits' version "a delectable item".

=== Other versions ===
The Rockin' Vickers also released "Dandy" as the A-side to a 1966 single. (Their main claim to fame was that Lemmy was a band member before his stint with Hawkwind and his formation of Motörhead.) British singer Clinton Ford also released a version of the song as a single in the same year.

The Kinks' Pye Records label mate David Garrick included the song on his 1967 album "A Boy Named David", as well as a live version on the 1968 German release "David Garrick and the Dandys - Blow-Up Live".

== Charts ==
The Kinks' version
| Chart (1966–67) | Peak position |
|---|---|
| Austria (Ö3 Austria Top 40) | 6 |
| Belgium (Ultratop 50 Flanders) | 3 |
| Belgium (Ultratop 50 Wallonia) | 14 |
| France (SNICOP) | 41 |
| Germany (GfK) | 1 |
| Netherlands (Veronica Top 40) | 3 |
| Netherlands (Single Top 100) | 2 |

Herman's Hermits' version
| Chart (1966–67) | Peak position |
|---|---|
| Australia (Kent Music Report) | 14 |
| Canada Top Singles (RPM) | 1 |
| Denmark (Danmarks Radio) | 4 |
| New Zealand (Listener) | 3 |
| US Billboard Hot 100 | 5 |
| US Cash Box Top 100 | 8 |
| US Record World 100 Top Pops | 6 |

The Rocking Vickers' version
| Chart (1966–2016) | Peak position |
|---|---|
| Sweden (Tio i Topp) | 10 |
| UK (Disc and Music Echo Top 50) | 29 |
| UK (Melody Maker Top 50) | 40 |
| UK Physical Singles (Official Charts) | 78 |
