= Victoria (The Kinks song) =

1969 song written by Ray Davies

- Dutch picture sleeve

Single by the Kinks

from the album Arthur (Or the Decline and Fall of the British Empire)
- B-side: "Mr. Churchill Says" (UK); "Brainwashed" (US)
- Released: 15 October 1969
- Recorded: May–June 1969
- Studio: Pye, London
- Genre: Rock
- Length: 3:37
- Label: Pye (UK); Reprise (US)
- Songwriter: Ray Davies
- Producer: Ray Davies

The Kinks UK singles chronology
"Shangri-La" (1969)	"Victoria" (1969)	"Lola" (1970)

The Kinks US singles chronology
"The Village Green Preservation Society" (1968)	"Victoria" (1969)	"Lola" (1970)

"Victoria" is a song written by Ray Davies of the Kinks. It is the opening track on the band's 1969 concept album Arthur (Or the Decline and Fall of the British Empire).

Both nostalgic and satirical, Ray Davies' lyrics juxtapose the grim realities of life in Britain during the 19th century ("Sex was bad, called obscene/And the rich were so mean") with the paternalist aspirations of the British Empire in the Victorian age ("From the West to the East/From the rich to the poor/Victoria loved them all"), and expresses the simple adulation of queen and country by the downtrodden working class ("Though I am poor, I am free/When I grow I shall fight/For this land I shall die").

The production begins with a simple heavy rock electric blues guitar riff, carried through each verse and chorus, while the "Land of hope and gloria" bridge and raucous background vocals from Dave Davies build to an exultant climax of brass.

Reviewing the single, Record World called it "beautiful", stating that it "will soon be the cry of the nation".

== Chart performance ==
In the US, "Victoria" was the lead single from Arthur, backed with album track "Brainwashed", and reached No. 62 on the Billboard Hot 100 – their highest position there since their top 20 hit "Sunny Afternoon" in 1966. In the UK, The Kinks' previous two singles had failed to chart. "Victoria" was released as the third and final single from the album in December (backed with "Mr. Churchill Says"), returning them to the UK Singles Chart, reaching a peak of No. 33. In Canada, the song was a hit in the greater Toronto area, reaching No. 9 on the CHUM Top 30 on 21 March 1970, and staying in the charts for a number of weeks. In Australia, it spent seven weeks in the charts, peaking at No. 57. On Sweden's Tio i Topp chart it reached number 8.

== Notable cover versions ==
A version by the Fall was a UK Top 40 hit in 1988. A version by the Kooks was released on the War Child charity album, Heroes, in February 2009. The album was also released as a 7" boxed set including a 7" with the Kooks' version of "Victoria" on one side and the Kinks' version on the other.

== In popular culture ==
The instrumental introduction of the song was prominently featured throughout the second episode of How I Met Your Mother's seventh season, "The Naked Truth", culminating when at the end of the episode, Ted Mosby spots his ex-girlfriend Victoria across a gala.

== Personnel ==
According to band researcher Doug Hinman:

The Kinks

- Ray Davies – lead vocal, acoustic and electric guitars
- Dave Davies – backing vocal, electric guitar
- John Dalton – backing vocal, bass guitar
- Mick Avory – drums, tambourine

Additional musicians

- Lew Warburton – horn arrangement
- Unidentified session musicians – horn section
