= Shangri-La (The Kinks song) =

- French picture sleeve

Single by the Kinks

from the album Arthur (Or the Decline and Fall of the British Empire)
- B-side: "This Man He Weeps Tonight"
- Released: 12 September 1969
- Recorded: May–June 1969
- Studio: Pye, London
- Genre: Rock; baroque pop; folk
- Length: 5:20
- Label: Pye
- Songwriter: Ray Davies
- Producer: Ray Davies

The Kinks UK singles chronology
"Drivin'" (1969)	"Shangri-La" (1969)	"Victoria" (1969)

"Shangri-La" is a song written by Ray Davies of the Kinks. The song appeared on the 1969 concept album, Arthur (Or the Decline and Fall of the British Empire). The song's inspiration can be traced back to when the band visited the Davies brothers' sister, Rose, and her family in Australia, the "designed community" that the family lived in serving as the initial lyrical inspiration. The song's highly ironic lyrics comment on British class society while portraying Arthur, the album's ill-fated protagonist, and his empty life in the suburbs. The musical aspects of the song both reflect and comment on the mood of the lyrics.

"Shangri-La" was released as the second single from Arthur in the United Kingdom, backed with "This Man He Weeps Tonight". The single was a commercial failure, not reaching the charts in any countries besides the Netherlands. The members of the band, however, thought highly of the song, with both Dave Davies and John Dalton singling it out for praise.

== Lyrics and music ==
The initial inspiration for "Shangri-La" came when Rose Davies, the sister of Kinks members Ray and Dave Davies, emigrated with her husband, Arthur, to Australia. When the band performed a show in the area during January 1964, the Davies brothers visited their sister in the Adelaide suburb of Elizabeth, where she and her family lived in a semi-detached home in a "designed community." This event was later used as the basis for the song in 1969.

The track forms the centrepiece of Arthur (Or the Decline and Fall of the British Empire). The song opens quietly with the picking of an acoustic guitar in a minor key, soon to be joined by Davies singing. The lyrics are rife with commentary on British class society and are highly ironic, and in the beginning seemingly condescending, as they mock the illusions of the protagonist Arthur, speaking of his modest home, which he has paid for through a life of toil and hard work, as if it is some kind of paradise or "kingdom to command," replete with typical modern conveniences such as indoor plumbing and a rocking chair, unlike the kind of working-class house in which he grew up with "lavatories in the back yard," but which has turned out to become strangling and prisonlike with "mortgage hanging over his head," "bills and the water rates and payments on the car," as well as nosy and meddlesome neighbors. Davies provides a note of empathy for Arthur's empty life in a line stating that he accepts this because "he's conditioned that way." However, the bridge rocks harder as the lyrics express anger at the superficial suburban lifestyle that Arthur has bought into and his fear of confronting a "false Eden."

The band's guitarist, Dave Davies, has since said that the song's lyrics were misunderstood. He said, "Particularly, I like 'Shangri-La,' a very compassionate song which was totally misinterpreted as though we were having a go at the little, common man."

== Reception ==
Music critic Johnny Rogan calls the song "one of Davies' best from the period," noting that "his ambivalence to the subject is evident throughout as he takes an alternately affectionate and sardonic look at cosy middle class aspiration." Allmusic critic Stewart Mason agrees that "Shangri-La" is "one of Ray Davies' finest songs ever." George Starostin, on his music review website "Only Solitaire", praises the song, saying that it "ranks as one of the top three or four Kinks' songs ever".

"Shangri-La" was released as a single in Britain, but like the Kinks previous single, "Drivin'", "Shangri-La" failed to chart in the UK or US. Dave Davies has since expressed disappointment in the single's lack of commercial success, saying, "Ray was writing fantastic, sensitive words that were so relevant to what was going on - better than any politician. I was really surprised at the response we got to (single) 'Shangri-La,' because I thought it was going to be a massive, massive hit." He went on to say, "As a creative person you may think you've failed at something, then find out later that you've really learned from it. I wish I'd realised that when I was feeling really shitty about 'Shangri-La' not being number one." It did reach number 27 in the Netherlands.

Bassist John Dalton named the track his favourite Kinks song.

== Other appearances ==
- The song is featured in a UK advert about reducing your carbon footprint and a UK trailer for the BBC3 comedy programme The Wrong Door.
- A new recording 2009 can be found on the release The Kinks Choral Collection by Ray Davies with the Crouch End Festival Chorus.
- The mid-season finale of season 3 of the American television series Last Man on Earth closes with the song.

== Personnel ==
According to band researcher Doug Hinman:

- Ray Davies – lead vocals, acoustic and electric guitar
- Dave Davies – backing vocals, electric guitar
- John Dalton – bass guitar
- Mick Avory – drums
