= Sitting in the Midday Sun =

Single by The Kinks

from the album Preservation Act 1
- B-side: "Sweet Lady Genevieve" (US); "One of the Survivors" (UK)
- Released: June 1973
- Recorded: June 1973
- Studio: Konk Studios, Hornsey, North London
- Genre: Rock; folk rock; music hall
- Length: 3:47
- Label: RCA
- Songwriter: Ray Davies
- Producer: Ray Davies

The Kinks singles chronology
"Celluloid Heroes" (1972)	"Sitting in the Midday Sun" (1973)	"Sweet Lady Genevieve" (1973)

Music video
- "Sitting in the Midday Sun" on YouTube

"Sitting in the Midday Sun" is a song by British rock band the Kinks, written by their frontman and main songwriter Ray Davies. It was recorded in June 1973 and released as a single in the US and UK the same year. Reviews were generally positive, but it failed to chart. "Sitting in the Midday Sun" was included on Preservation Act 1, released in November 1973. Act 1 peaked at number 177 on the US Billboard charts, but failed to make an impression on the UK charts.

== Background and recording ==
Doug Hinman estimates that "Sitting in the Midday Sun" was the first track recorded at the Kinks' new Konk Studios. The song was recorded around 8 June, and was worked on along with several other tracks from the band's upcoming LP.

Izabela Curyllo-Klag regarded the protagonist of "Sitting in the Midday Sun" to be an example of a Davies' character dealing with economic and social stresses by retaining his authenticity and becoming an outcast on the margins of society, as opposed to other Davies' characters aspiring to social mobility but losing authenticity.

== Release and reception ==
It was backed by "One of the Survivors" for its UK release, where it came out in June; for its August release in the US, "Sweet Lady Genevieve" was substituted. The single was given little promotion on either side of the Atlantic, and failed to chart, but was well received by the American rock press. Alan Betrock of Rock Marketplace wrote: "The new Kinks record has to bring smiles onto a lot of faces. ... 'Sitting in the Midday Sun' sounds like it could have come right off of Village Green and melodically and lyrically is quite fine." Reception in the UK was mixed. Melody Maker praised "Sitting in the Midday Sun", noting its "lazy summer sound," and calling it "another winning tune from Raymond Douglas Davies and the boys." New Musical Express was mixed: "One of those lightweight singles The Kinks put out when they're waiting for Ray Davies to come up with something truly remarkable. It's an adequately pleasant little summer song that will do what it's supposed to do." Disc called it "one of the week's better releases". Record World called it "a change of pace from this English contingent as Ray Davies slows it down a bit with this pleasant ditty" and said that the "background vocals are akin to those of their classic 'Waterloo Sunset.'"

== Aftermath and album release ==
"Sitting in the Midday Sun" was released during a period of turmoil for the Kinks—bandleader Ray Davies' marital problems with his wife Rasa came to a head nine days before the song's UK release when she left him, taking their children with her. Ray went into a state of depression; Doug Hinman wrote about his condition: "a week following his wife's departure, an emotionally distraught Ray [was] admitted to hospital for suspected barbiturate poisoning. He [was] treated and released." Shortly after the incident, on 15 July, the Kinks made an infamous appearance at the White City Stadium. According to a Melody Maker review of the concert, "Davies swore on stage. He stood at The White City and swore that he was 'F...... [sic] sick of the whole thing'. ... He was 'Sick up to here with it' ... and those that heard shook their heads. Mick [Avory, drummer] just ventured a disbelieving smile, and drummed on through 'Waterloo Sunset.'" At the show's conclusion, as pretaped music played on the sound system, Ray declared that he was quitting. He subsequently collapsed after a drug overdose and was rushed to hospital. Dave Davies later commented in an interview about the incident:

God, that was horrible. That was when Ray tried to top himself. I thought he looked a bit weird after the show—I didn't know that he'd taken a whole bloody bottle of weird-looking psychiatric pills. It was a bad time. Ray suddenly announced that he was going to end it all ... I think he took the pills before the show. I said to him towards the end that he was getting a bit crazy. I didn't know what happened—I suddenly got a phone call saying he was in the hospital. I remember going to the hospital after they'd pumped his stomach and it was bad.

With Ray Davies in a seemingly critical condition, plans were discussed for Dave to continue as frontman in a worst-case scenario. Ray eventually pulled through and recovered from his illness as well as his depression, but throughout the remainder of the Kinks' theatrical incarnation the band's output remained uneven, and their popularity, which had already faded, declined even more. (Note: Portions of this section (Aftermath and album release), namely the one concerning Ray Davies' incident at the White City Stadium, are closely modeled after or incorporate text from the "Theatrical incarnation (1973–1976)" section of The Kinks Wikipedia article.)

== Modern opinion ==
Modern criticism towards "Sitting in the Midday Sun" and Preservation as a whole is mixed. Stephen Thomas Erlewine of Allmusic called "Sitting in the Midday Sun" "endearingly lazy," and noted it as one of the highlights of the album. Nevile Marten and Jeff Hudson, however, called it a "joint rewrite of 'Sunny Afternoon' and 'Sitting by the Riverside' ... that was never necessary."

== Personnel ==
- Ray Davies – Lead vocals, acoustic guitar
- Dave Davies – Backing vocals, lead guitar, acoustic guitar
- John Dalton – Bass guitar
- Mick Avory – Drums, percussion
- John Gosling – Keyboards
- Alan Holmes – Alto flute
