= Face to Face (The Kinks album) =

Studio album by the Kinks
- Released: 28 October 1966
- Recorded: October 1965 ("I'll Remember"); 12 April – 20 June 1966
- Studios: Pye, London
- Genres: Rock; baroque pop; garage pop; art pop
- Length: 38:31
- Labels: Pye (UK); Reprise (US)
- Producer: Shel Talmy

The Kinks chronology
| Well Respected Kinks (1966) | Face to Face (1966) | Something Else by the Kinks (1967) |

The Kinks US chronology
| The Kinks Greatest Hits! (1966) | Face to Face (1966) | The Live Kinks (1967) |

Singles from Face to Face
- 1. "Sunny Afternoon" Released: 3 June 1966; 2. "Dandy" / "Party Line" Released: Late 1966 (EU) (Note: Release of "Dandy" as a single in the UK and US was cancelled after Herman's Hermits recorded their version, but its release went ahead in continental Europe. The single's first European chart debut was on the Dutch Veronica Top 40 chart for the week ending 8 October 1966.)

Face to Face is the fourth studio album by the English rock band the Kinks, released on 28 October 1966. The album marked a shift from the hard-driving style of beat music that had catapulted the group to international acclaim in 1964, instead drawing heavily from baroque pop and music hall. It is their first album consisting entirely of original material, and has also been regarded by critics as one of rock's first concept albums. Ray Davies' blossoming songwriting style became increasingly observational and satirical, commenting on English culture, social class and the music industry.

Despite containing the hit single, "Sunny Afternoon", the album's initial reception was lukewarm in both the UK and US compared to the Kinks' previous LPs, charting at No. 12 and No. 135, respectively. Face to Face eventually earned retrospective critical acclaim, recognised as a pivotal record of the psychedelic era and an important milestone in the Kinks' evolution. The album was included in Robert Christgau's "Basic Record Library" of 1950s and 1960s recordings, published in Christgau's Record Guide: Rock Albums of the Seventies (1981). The album was included in the book 1001 Albums You Must Hear Before You Die.

== Background ==
Ray Davies suffered a nervous breakdown just prior to the major recording sessions for the album. In contrast to the band's earlier "raunchy" sound, he had more recently started to introduce a new, softer style of writing with compositions such as "A Well Respected Man" and "Dedicated Follower of Fashion". In July 1966, the single "Sunny Afternoon", also written in that style, reached No. 1 in the UK Singles Chart, and the song's popularity proved to Davies and the Kinks' managers that the group could find success with this style of songwriting. The new album would follow this pattern, as would the group's recorded output for the next five years. The 1966–71 period inaugurated by this album would later be called Davies' and the Kinks' "golden age".

Rock historians have credited the album as arguably one of the first rock/pop concept albums, with the loose common theme of social observation. In the album's original conception Ray Davies attempted to bridge the songs together with sound effects, but he was forced by Pye Records to revert to the more standard album format before the album's release. Some effects remain, such as in "Party Line", "Holiday in Waikiki", "Rainy Day in June" and in songs not included on the final album ("End of the Season", "Big Black Smoke").

== Recording and production ==
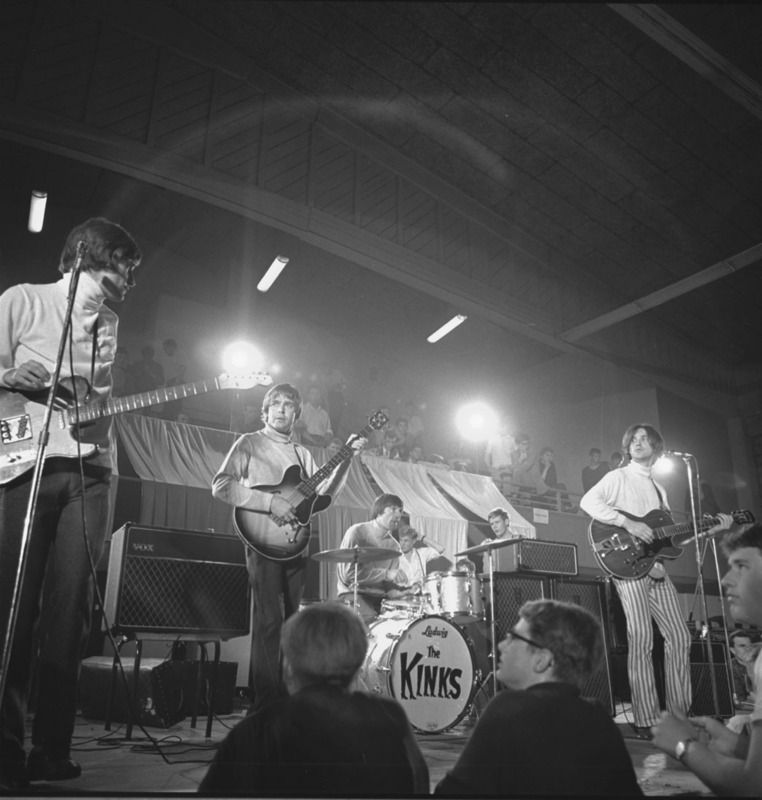
The Kinks performing in Oslo, Norway, on 16 June 1966. John Dalton, second from left, served as a temporary bassist after Pete Quaife was injured in a car crash on 3 June.

"I'll Remember" was the earliest track on the album, having been recorded in October 1965 during sessions for The Kink Kontroversy. Two other songs recorded during the Face to Face sessions – "This Is Where I Belong" and "She's Got Everything" – were eventually released as B-sides to singles released in 1967 and 1968, respectively. Both songs eventually appeared on the 1972 US compilation album The Kink Kronikles. Pete Quaife temporarily quit the band before the June–July 1966 recording sessions; his replacement John Dalton can only be confirmed as playing on the track "Little Miss Queen of Darkness". Contractual issues held up the release of the album for several months after recording was completed; Ray Davies was also in conflict with Pye over the final album cover art, whose psychedelic theme he later felt was inappropriate.

Two songs on Face to Face, although written by Ray Davies, were originally recorded and released by other British bands in the months prior to the release of this album. The Pretty Things had a minor UK hit in July 1966 with "A House in the Country", which peaked at No. 50; their final entry on the UK Singles Chart. Herman's Hermits, meanwhile, took their version of "Dandy" top ten in several countries (including No. 5 in the US and No. 1 in Canada), beginning in September 1966. The Rockin' Vickers also recorded a version of "Dandy" which they released as a single in December 1966 in both the UK and the US. Despite what the sleeve notes say on the Rockin' Vickers' The Complete, the song "Little Rosy" was not written by Ray Davies (Music: Herbie Armstrong; Lyrics: Paul Murphy).

== Release and reception ==
Professional ratings
Review scores
| Source | Rating |
|---|---|
| AllMusic | 5/5 stars |
| Encyclopedia of Popular Music | 4/5 stars |
| The Rolling Stone Album Guide | 5/5 stars |
| MusicHound Rock | 5/5 stars |
| Uncut | 4/5 stars |

The album was released in a particularly tumultuous year for the band, with personnel problems (Pete Quaife was injured; he resigned and later rejoined the band), legal and contractual battles and an ongoing hectic touring schedule. The album was critically well received, but did not sell particularly well at the time of its release (especially in the United States), and was out of print for many years. Reissues since 1998 have included bonus tracks of songs released contemporaneously as singles (most notably "Dead End Street") as well as two unreleased tracks.

The album was included in the book 1001 Albums You Must Hear Before You Die.

== Unreleased songs ==
"Mr. Reporter" was recorded in 1969 for Dave Davies' aborted solo album, and was released as a bonus track on the 1998 Castle CD reissue of Face to Face. An earlier version featuring Ray Davies on lead vocals was recorded in February 1966 and was apparently intended for this album or an unissued EP. (Note: A 4-song EP of new Kinks material tentatively titled Occupations was mooted by Pye Records for issue sometime in 1966, although it never got past initial planning stages. Many of the unreleased tracks from this era, some of which were presumably earmarked for the EP, have an occupational theme.) The scathing track satirizes the pop press, and was probably shelved to prevent offending music journalists who had been crucial to the Kinks' commercial success. This early version was finally officially released in 2014.

Other unreleased songs from the Face to Face sessions reportedly include "Fallen Idol", about the rise and fall of a pop star, "Everybody Wants to Be a Personality", about celebrities, "Lilacs and Daffodils" (also known as "Sir Jasper"), which is reportedly about a schoolteacher (and is the only Kinks track with vocals by Mick Avory) and "A Girl Who Goes to Discotheques". It is unclear whether any of the unreleased tracks will ever be released officially. Dave Davies indicated they were never satisfactorily completed for release, and some were later reworked into different songs such as "Yes Man", another song from these sessions, which was an early version of "Plastic Man". In a 2012 interview, Ray Davies stated that "Lilacs and Daffodils" was "awful".

== Track listing ==
All tracks are written by Ray Davies, except "Party Line" by Ray and Dave Davies. Track lengths per AllMusic.

Side one

1. "Party Line" – 2:35
2. "Rosy Won't You Please Come Home" – 2:34
3. "Dandy" – 2:12
4. "Too Much on My Mind" – 2:28
5. "Session Man" – 2:14
6. "Rainy Day in June" – 3:10
7. "House in the Country" – 3:03

Side two

1. "Holiday in Waikiki" – 2:52
2. "Most Exclusive Residence for Sale" – 2:48
3. "Fancy" – 2:30
4. "Little Miss Queen of Darkness" – 3:16
5. "You're Looking Fine" – 2:46
6. "Sunny Afternoon" – 3:36
7. "I'll Remember" – 2:27

== Personnel ==
According to band researcher Doug Hinman, except where noted:

The Kinks

- Ray Davies – lead and backing vocals, guitars; musical director, arrangements, (Note: The original LP labels credit Talmy as producer. The sleeve notes instead credit him as "Recorder", Ray Davies as "Musical Director" and both Ray and Dave Davies with "arrangements".) illustration
- Dave Davies – backing vocals, guitars; lead vocals ("Party Line" and "You're Looking Fine"); arrangements
- Pete Quaife – bass guitar
- Mick Avory – drums

Additional musicians

- John Dalton – bass guitar ("Little Miss Queen of Darkness")
- Rasa Davies – backing vocals ("Sunny Afternoon")
- Nicky Hopkins – piano, harpsichord; melodica ("Sunny Afternoon")

Additional production

- Shel Talmy – recorder
- Alan MacKenzie (Note: Sources vary in their spelling of his last name. Most, including Ray in his autobiography, spell it MacKenzie, while others use Mackenzie or McKenzie. The original liner notes typeset it as McKENZIE.) – engineer
- Alan O'Duffy (credited as "Irish") – assistant engineer

Note

- On 3 June 1966, Quaife was seriously injured in a car crash. In Ray's 1994 autobiography, he wrote that, while Quaife recuperated from his injuries, the band hired an unidentified session bassist for a marathon session on 6 June. Ray identified six songs recorded during the session: "Rosy Won't You Please Come Home", "Too Much On My Mind", "Session Man", "Rainy Day In June", "You're Looking Fine" and the unreleased "Fallen Idol". Quaife disputed Ray's account, contending that the six songs were recorded before his crash and that the bass guitar heard closely resembles his playing style. Talmy later said he did not recall hiring a session bassist for a marathon session and that the playing style does not resemble that of Herbie Flowers, whom Talmy typically called for session work. Hinman concludes: "No definitive resolution to the confusion is available." According to Hinman, the bassist John Dalton's only confirmed contribution to the album is on "Little Miss Queen of Darkness", recorded 21 June.

== Charts ==
Weekly chart performance for Face to Face
| Chart (1966–67) | Peak position |
|---|---|
| Finnish Suomen virallinen lista LPs Chart | 2 |
| Norwegian Albums (VG-lista) | 9 |
| UK Melody Maker Top Ten LPs | 8 |
| UK Record Retailer LPs Chart | 12 |
| US Billboard Top LPs | 135 |
| US Cash Box Top 100 Albums | 57 |
| US Record World 100 Top LPs | 47 |
| West German Musikmarkt LP Hit Parade | 12 |

== See also ==
- British Invasion
- British rock
- Music Hall
- Satire
- Swinging London

== Sources ==
- Anon. (1966). Face to Face (Liner notes). The Kinks. Pye Records. NPL 18149.
- Davies, Ray (1995). X-Ray: The Unauthorised Autobiography. Woodstock, New York: Overlook Press. ISBN 978-0-87951-611-6.
- Doggett, Peter (1998). The Kinks Are the Village Green Preservation Society (Liner notes). The Kinks. Essential. ESM CD 481.
- Hasted, Nick (2011). The Story of the Kinks: You Really Got Me. London: Omnibus Press. ISBN 978-1-84938-660-9 – via the Internet Archive.
- Hinman, Doug (2004). The Kinks: All Day and All of the Night: Day-by-Day Concerts, Recordings and Broadcasts, 1961–1996. San Francisco, California: Backbeat Books. ISBN 978-0-87930-765-3.
- Hinman, Doug; Sandoval, Andrew (2026). The Kinks: All Day and All of the Night: The Day-by-Day Story Pt. 1: 1940–1971. Beatland Books.
- Howard, David N. (2004). Sonic Alchemy: Visionary Music Producers and Their Maverick Recordings. Milwaukee, Wisconsin: Hal Leonard Corporation. ISBN 978-0-634-05560-7.
- Irvin, Jim; McLear, Colin, eds. (2003). The Mojo Collection: The Ultimate Music Companion. Edinburgh: Canongate Books. ISBN 978-1-84195-438-7 – via the Internet Archive.
- Jovanovic, Rob (2013). God Save the Kinks: A Biography. London: Aurum Press. ISBN 978-1-84513-671-0 – via the Internet Archive.
- Kitts, Thomas M., ed. (2002). "Chronology". Living on a Thin Line: Crossing Aesthetic Borders with The Kinks. Rumford, Rhode Island: Desolation Angel Books. pp. 9–24. ISBN 0-9641005-4-1.
- Kitts, Thomas M. (2008). Ray Davies: Not Like Everybody Else. New York City: Routledge. ISBN 978-0-415-97768-5 – via the Internet Archive.
- Massey, Howard (2015). The Great British Recording Studios. Milwaukee, Wisconsin: Hal Leonard Corporation. ISBN 978-1-4950-3533-3 – via Google Books.
- Miller, Andy (2003). The Kinks are the Village Green Preservation Society. 33⅓ series. New York City: Bloomsbury Academic. ISBN 978-0-8264-1498-4.
- Rogan, Johnny (1998). The Complete Guide to the Music of the Kinks. London: Omnibus Press. ISBN 978-0-7119-6314-6.
- Schaffner, Nicholas (1982). The British Invasion: From the First Wave to the New Wave. New York City: McGraw Hill. ISBN 978-0-07-055089-6.
- Thompson, Gordon (2008). Please Please Me: Sixties British Pop, Inside Out. New York City: Oxford University Press. ISBN 978-0-19-971555-8 – via Google Books.
