= Preservation Act 1 =

Studio album by the Kinks
- Released: 16 November 1973
- Recorded: March–July 1973
- Studios: Konk, London
- Genre: Rock
- Length: 39:16
- Label: RCA
- Producer: Ray Davies

The Kinks chronology
The Great Lost Kinks Album (1973)	Preservation Act 1 (1973)	Preservation Act 2 (1974)

Singles from Preservation Act 1
- 1. "One of the Survivors" Released: 20 April 1973 (US); 2. "Sitting in the Midday Sun" Released: June 1973; 3. "Sweet Lady Genevieve" Released: 21 September 1973 (UK)

Professional ratings
Review scores
Source	Rating
Allmusic	2.5/5 stars
Encyclopedia of Popular Music	3/5 stars
The Great Rock Discography	5/10
Pitchfork	9.8/10
Uncut	4/5 stars

Preservation Act 1 is a concept album and the twelfth studio album by the English rock group the Kinks, released 16 November 1973 by RCA Records.

== Reception ==
Preservation Act 1 was well received by many critics at the time. A review in Rolling Stone by Ken Barnes was critical of Ray Davies' "tendency toward vaudevillian excess", but overall he rated Preservation as a "highly listenable, enjoyable album". Barnes singled out "Sitting in the Midday Sun" as a "wistfully irresistible" number and labeled "One of the Survivors" the Kinks' "best outright rocker" in years. Gary Lucas, reviewing Preservation Act 1 for Zoo World, also had high praise for the work, stating: "Dare I say it is one of the nicest albums to be released this year (if not the best)? Of course I will." Focusing on the musical theater aspects of the LP, Barbara Charone ranked the album as one of the "most impressive" of the Kinks' career.

However, it did not sell well peaking on the Billboard 200 at No. 177.

Some more recent reviews of Preservation Act 1 have been sympathetic to its theatrical ambitions, such as AllMusic's Stephen Thomas Erlewine, who declared "Sweet Lady Genevieve" to be the "real candidate for Davies' forgotten masterpiece".

== Re-release ==
The 1991 CD reissue on Rhino was a 2-CD set combining Preservation Act 1 with its 1974 follow-up Preservation Act 2 under the title Preservation: A Play in Two Acts. It featured an extended mix of "Money & Corruption/I Am Your Man" with an extra instrumental break and one bonus track, non-album single "Preservation".

The 1998 CD reissue of Preservation Act 1 on Velvel included additional bonus track, the single versions of "One of the Survivors".

== Cultural references ==
The chorus from side 2's "Money and Corruption" was used by the hackers group Anonymous when attacking governmental websites during the 2014 World Cup.

== Track listing ==
All tracks are written by Ray Davies.

Side one
No.	Title	Length
1.	"Morning Song"	2:00
2.	"Daylight"	3:19
3.	"Sweet Lady Genevieve"	3:26
4.	"There's a Change in the Weather"	2:59
5.	"Where Are They Now?"	3:28
6.	"One of the Survivors"	4:31

Side two
No.	Title	Length
1.	"Cricket"	2:56
2.	"Money and Corruption/I Am Your Man"	6:01
3.	"Here Comes Flash"	2:41
4.	"Sitting in the Midday Sun"	3:47
5.	"Demolition"	4:07

Bonus track on the Preservation: A Play in Two Acts and digital edition
No.	Title	Length
12.	"Preservation"	3:37

Additional bonus tracks on the 1998 CD edition
No.	Title	Length
1.	"Preservation"	3:37
13.	"One of the Survivors" (single edit)	4:07

== Personnel ==
The Kinks

- Ray Davies – vocals, guitar, harmonica
- Dave Davies – guitar, vocals
- John Dalton – bass
- Mick Avory – drums
- John Gosling – keyboards

Additional personnel

- Alan Holmes – reeds
- Laurie Brown – trumpet
- John Beecham – trombone, tuba
- Krysia Kocjan, Lee Pavey, Lewis Rich, Pamela Travis, Sue Brown – additional singers

Technical

- Dave Davies – engineer
- Roger Beale – engineer
- Pat Doyle – art direction
- Chris Hopper – photography
