= Waterloo Sunset: The Very Best of The Kinks & Ray Davies =

Compilation album by The Kinks
- Released: 13 August 2012
- Genre: Rock, pop
- Length: 70:13

The Kinks chronology
The Kinks in Mono (2012)	Waterloo Sunset: The Very Best of The Kinks & Ray Davies (2012)	The Essential Kinks (2014)

Waterloo Sunset: The Very Best of The Kinks & Ray Davies is a compilation album containing recordings by the Kinks and Ray Davies, released on 13 August 2012.

== Reception ==
Financial Times reviewer Ludovic Hunter-Tilney gave the collection three stars, noting that it is one of more than 30 Kinks greatest-hit collections that have been released during the band's long history. The review found the first CD to be similar to others, but the second CD "more distinctive" in its assortment of Kinks and Davies recordings about London. Neil McCormick of The Daily Telegraph criticized the collection for lacking or providing lower quality versions of some of the greatest Kinks hits, such as "Victoria", "I Go to Sleep", and "Stop Your Sobbing", but overall he found the release to be "an extraordinary album none the less", praising the second disc's collection of London songs and awarding an overall rating of four stars out of five.

== Track listing ==
CD 1

1. "Waterloo Sunset"
2. "You Really Got Me"
3. "Tired of Waiting for You"
4. "Sunny Afternoon"
5. "All Day and All of the Night"
6. "Till the End of the Day"
7. "Autumn Almanac"
8. "Days"
9. "Lola"
10. "Set Me Free"
11. "See My Friends" (choral version)
12. "Death of a Clown"
13. "Apeman"
14. "Dead End Street"
15. "This Time Tomorrow"
16. "Strangers"
17. "You Don't Know My Name"
18. "Wonderboy"
19. "Plastic Man"
20. "Supersonic Rocket Ship"
21. "Better Things"
22. "Don't Forget to Dance"
23. "David Watts" (live in New York, 1980)

CD 2

1. "Dedicated Follower of Fashion"
2. "Come Dancing"
3. "Where Have All the Good Times Gone" (live in Massachusetts, 1979)
4. "Victoria" (live in Switzerland, 1979)
5. "Big Black Smoke"
6. "Yours Truly, Confused N10"
7. "Working Man's Cafe"
8. "London Song"
9. "Fortis Green"
10. "Postcard from London"
11. "Muswell Hillbilly"
12. "Denmark Street"
13. "Berkeley Mews"
14. "Holloway Jail"
15. "Lavender Hill"
16. "Willesden Green"
17. "Life On the Road"
18. "End of the Season"
19. "Next Door Neighbour"
20. "Did Ya"
21. "Most Exclusive Residence for Sale"
22. "Waterloo Sunset" (choral version)
