= Lola Versus Powerman and the Moneygoround, Part One =

Eighth studio album by the English rock band the Kinks

Studio album by the Kinks
- Released: 27 November 1970
- Recorded: April–May and August–September 1970
- Studios: Morgan, London
- Genres: Rock; pop
- Length: 40:25
- Labels: Pye (UK); Reprise (US)
- Producer: Ray Davies

The Kinks UK chronology
Arthur (Or the Decline and Fall of the British Empire) (1969)	Lola Versus Powerman and the Moneygoround, Part One (1970)	Percy (1971)

The Kinks US chronology
Arthur (Or the Decline and Fall of the British Empire) (1969)	Lola Versus Powerman and the Moneygoround, Part One (1971)	Muswell Hillbillies (1971)

Singles from Lola Versus Powerman and the Moneygoround, Part One
- 1. "Lola" Released: 12 June 1970; 2. "Apeman" Released: 20 November 1970

Lola Versus Powerman and the Moneygoround, Part One, commonly abbreviated to Lola Versus Powerman, or simply Lola, is the eighth studio album by the English rock band the Kinks, released on 27 November 1970. A concept album, it is a satirical appraisal of the music industry, including song publishers, unions, the press, accountants, business managers, and life on the road. It marked the group's expansion to a five-piece with the addition of keyboardist John Gosling.

Although it appeared during a transitional period for the Kinks, Lola Versus Powerman was a success both critically and commercially for the group, charting in the Top 40 in America and helping restore them in the public eye, making it a "comeback" album. It contained two hit singles: "Lola", which reached the top 10 in the US and UK, and "Apeman", which peaked at number five in the UK. In October 2020, Sanctuary Records released a 3-disc 50th Anniversary set that includes 36 extra tracks that include B-sides, outtakes, new mixes and alternate versions.

Musically Lola Versus Powerman is varied, described by Stephen Thomas Erlewine as "a wildly unfocused but nonetheless dazzling tour de force", containing some of Ray Davies's strongest songs. A second part never followed Part One.

== Background and recording ==
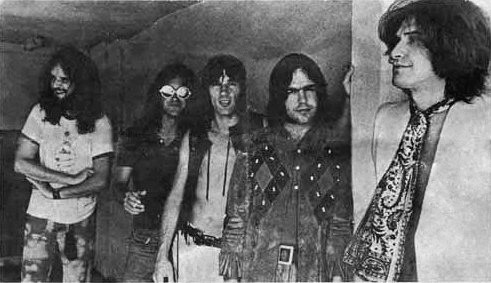
The Kinks, around the time of the recording of Lola Versus Powerman; from left: John Gosling, Dave Davies, Mick Avory, John Dalton, Ray Davies

The Kinks' ban by the American Federation of Musicians on performing in America, which had been in force since their 1965 US tour, was lifted in 1969, so the group's management arranged a North American tour. However, members of the band fell ill, and the tour was shuffled, resulting in the band playing only a few dates in America and Canada. A follow-up tour in 1970 met with similar results, with the group performing at only a select number of venues, with many dates cancelled. The down time between the tours allowed Ray Davies, lead singer and songwriter of the group, to develop the band's next single, "Lola".

The Kinks returned to England to start work on their new LP in spring 1970. The group used Morgan Studios, an independent studio in Willesden, London, which was a change for them. They would continue recording their albums there until Preservation, when they switched to their newly purchased studio, Konk. Recording began in late April/early May. Some of the first songs recorded were "Lola", the outtake "The Good Life", "Powerman" and "Got to Be Free". The sessions for "Lola" were especially long, and the recording continued into late May. Davies would recall later how he achieved the signature clangy sound at the beginning of the track:

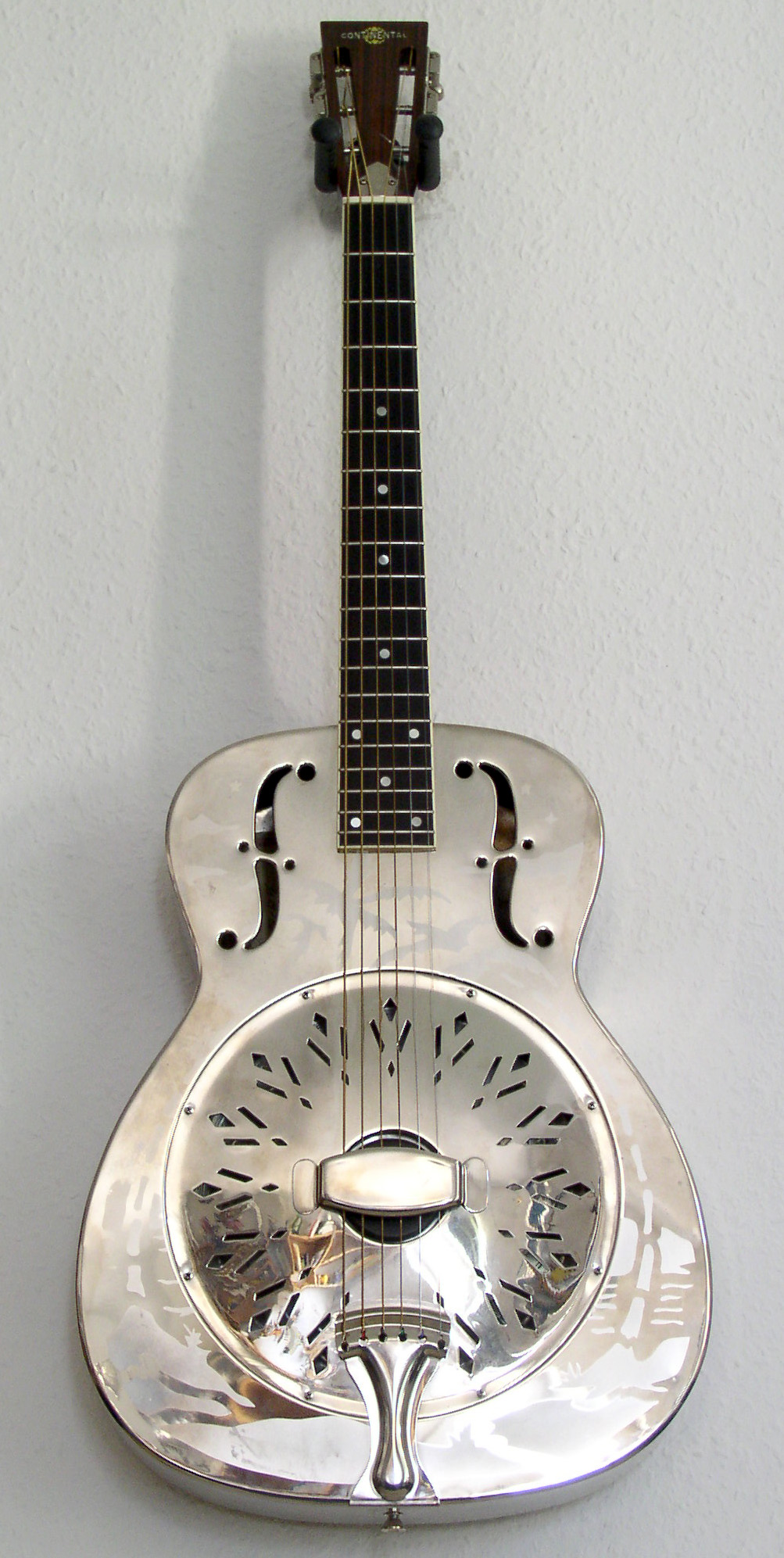
A National Steel resonator guitar

I remember going into a music store on Shaftesbury Avenue in London when we were about to make 'Lola'. I said, 'I want to get a really good guitar sound on this record. I want a Martin.' And in the corner they had this old 1938 dobro [resonator guitar, in this case a National Steel] that I bought for £150. I put them together on 'Lola' which is what makes that clangy sound: the combination of the Martin and the dobro with heavy compression.

The National Steel would play an integral part in many Kinks projects after that. In the 1972 song "Supersonic Rocket Ship", Ray Davies would use the guitar to create a Caribbean feel for the record. Davies would play it on numerous Top of the Pops appearances, and it would be featured in several music videos the Kinks made in the future, including "Scattered" in 1992.

Keyboardist John Gosling was added to the Kinks' lineup in May. He auditioned on the final backing master track for "Lola", and was hired soon after. He was initially taken on solely for their upcoming US tour, but his post evolved into a more permanent position soon after. Gosling would remain with the band until 1978, departing after the release of Misfits. Dubbing for "Lola" was finished in June. Recording for the LP was completed by October, and it was mixed throughout the remainder of the month. Lola Versus Powerman and the Moneygoround, Part One was released on 27 November 1970.

For "Lola", Ray Davies overdubbed the trademarked word "Coca-Cola" with the generic "cherry cola" for the mono single release, as product placement rules meant the BBC (being a public service broadcaster) would not have played it. The lyrics in the gatefold sleeve of the original LP use the "cherry cola" line, though the album track contains the original stereo "Coca-Cola" version. A similar situation was encountered with the song "Apeman", concerning the line "the air pollution is a-foggin' up my eyes". "Fogging" was mistaken for "fucking", and consequently Ray Davies had to re-record this line prior to its single release.

== Themes ==
The album is a satirical look at the various facets of the music industry, including song publishers ("Denmark Street"), unions ("Get Back in Line"), the press and the hit-making machine ("Top of the Pops"), accountants and business managers ("The Moneygoround") and the road ("This Time Tomorrow"). Musically, Lola Versus Powerman is varied, contrasting gentle ballads like "Get Back in Line" and "A Long Way from Home" against hard rock songs like "Rats" and "Powerman", with "Denmark Street" and "The Moneygoround" paying homage to the English music hall tradition.

== Critical reception ==
Professional ratings
Review scores
Source	Rating
AllMusic	4.5/5 stars
Blender	4/5 stars
Christgau's Record Guide	B−
Uncut	4/5 stars

Lola Versus Powerman was well-received throughout the British music press. A review in New Musical Express called "[Ray] Davies ... one of the finest writers in contemporary rock", and praised the record's British styles and originality. Melody Maker's interpretation of Lola Versus Powerman was Davies "taking a cheeky nibble" at the pop music business; they continued that "The music's pure Kinks simplicity—but it works."

The album received generally positive reviews in the US. Rolling Stone magazine commented that it was "the best Kinks album yet". Village Voice critic Robert Christgau commented that "Lola" had been an "astounding single", but gave Lola Versus Powerman a lukewarm review, saying that "the melodies are still there, but in this context they sound corny rather than plaintive." The single "Lola" received positive reviews, and, due to its success, an interview with Ray Davies by Jonathan Cott was featured as a cover story for Rolling Stone in November 1970.

Modern critical opinion towards Lola Versus Powerman is generally positive, albeit slightly less so. Initially given a positive review by Rolling Stone magazine in 1971, The Rolling Stone Album Guide rated it 3 1/2 out of 5 stars in its 1992 printing—however, the fourth edition of the Guide (published in 2004) ranked it at only 2 stars. Stephen Thomas Erlewine of AllMusic gave the album a positive review, writing that "Davies never really delivers a cohesive story, but the record holds together because it's one of his strongest sets of songs."

== Commercial performance ==
Lola Versus Powerman and the Moneygoround, Part One went virtually unnoticed by the record-buying public in the UK and failed to chart, despite the success of its lead single, "Lola", which topped the New Musical Express charts in the UK, and reached No. 2 on Melody Maker. "Lola" became the Kinks' biggest success since "Sunny Afternoon" in 1966; the group would never again have another single reach this position in the UK. "Lola" was also successful in the US market, charting at No. 9 on the Billboard Hot 100 singles chart, staying on the charts for 14 weeks. It also peaked at No. 7 on the Record World charts. Lola Versus Powerman and the Moneygoround, Part One reached No. 35 on Billboard, and on the Record World charts it peaked at No. 22, making it their most successful album since the mid-60s.

== Aftermath and legacy ==
The success of the singles and album allowed the Kinks to negotiate a new contract with RCA Records, construct their own London studio, which they named Konk, and assume more creative and managerial control. The record also proved influential: Tom Petty told Rolling Stone that he "especially liked" it, and cited the album as an influence on The Last DJ, another album critical of the music industry.

Tracks from Lola Versus Powerman have been featured in multiple films across several languages. "This Time Tomorrow", "Strangers", and "Powerman" were featured in the 2007 Wes Anderson film The Darjeeling Limited; these tracks were later included on the accompanying soundtrack album. In France, "This Time Tomorrow" appeared in the 2005 Philippe Garrel film Les amants réguliers. "Apeman" has been featured in multiple films, including Mondovino (2004) and Harold Ramis' Club Paradise (1986).

Ray Davies adapted the album into an autobiographical drama, with the help of co-writer Paul Sirett, including new versions of songs from the album. This was broadcast on BBC Radio 4 in December 2021.

== Part Two ==
Before the release of Lola Versus Powerman and the Moneygoround, Part One the band discussed the possibility of it being released as a double album. According to Doug Hinman's book, The Kinks: All Day and All of the Night, a sequel album was planned for release sometime in 1971, but was ultimately scrapped and the band opted to record Muswell Hillbillies instead. Due to the fact that an official title to the follow-up album was never revealed, Hinman refers to the album simply as Part Two and suggests that preliminary sessions may have occurred in late 1970/early 1971. It is unclear what songs would have appeared on this album, and it is unknown if any songs were even recorded, with the possible exception of some unreleased backing tracks. Almost certainly no songs were completed or mastered.

Ray Davies addressed the question of the unfinished sequel in a 2014 Uncut interview:

Lola Versus Powerman… was good versus evil, obviously, and in Volume Two, I sketched out how you become your worst nightmare, how the good man goes so far he becomes the evil person he always fought against. But we had to do another tour, we had the RCA deal, and we had other recording projects that we had to work towards, and it got lost, unfortunately.

== Reissues ==
Lola was reissued on CD in 1998 with three bonus tracks.

In 2014 the album was reissued on CD as a deluxe edition with seven previously unreleased bonus tracks and was paired with Percy as Lola versus Powerman and The Moneygoround and Percy two CD set.

== Track listing ==
All tracks are written by Ray Davies except where noted.

Side one
No.	Title	Writer(s)	Length
1.	"The Contenders"		2:42
2.	"Strangers"	Dave Davies	3:20
3.	"Denmark Street"		2:00
4.	"Get Back in Line"		3:04
5.	"Lola"		4:01
6.	"Top of the Pops"		3:40
7.	"The Moneygoround"		1:42

Side two
No.	Title	Writer(s)	Length
8.	"This Time Tomorrow"		3:22
9.	"A Long Way from Home"		2:27
10.	"Rats"	Dave Davies	2:40
11.	"Apeman"		3:52
12.	"Powerman"		4:16
13.	"Got to Be Free"		3:00

1998 and 2004 CD reissue bonus tracks
No.	Title	Length
14.	"Lola" (mono single mix)	4:08
15.	"Apeman" (stereo alternative version)	3:41
16.	"Powerman" (demo)	4:23

2014 deluxe edition bonus tracks
No.	Title	Length
14.	"Anytime"	3:33
15.	"The Contenders" (instrumental demo)	3:01
16.	"The Good Life"	3:16
17.	"Lola" (alternative version)	5:28
18.	"This Time Tomorrow" (instrumental)	3:19
19.	"Apeman" (alternative version, stereo)	3:42
20.	"Got to Be Free" (alternative version)	2:03

Notes

- Some CD editions separate the first 40 seconds of "The Contenders" as its own track titled "Introduction"

== Personnel ==
According to the band biographer Doug Hinman:

The Kinks

- Ray Davies – lead vocals; acoustic, electric and resonator guitars; harmonica (The Contenders), producer
- Dave Davies – backing vocals; electric and acoustic guitars; lead vocals ("Strangers" and "Rats")
- John Dalton – bass guitar
- Mick Avory – drums
- John Gosling – baby grand piano, electric piano, Hammond organ

Additional musician

- Ken Jones – maracas

Additional production

- Mike Bobak – engineer

== Charts ==
=== Weekly charts ===
Chart (1970)	Peak position
Australia (Kent Music Report)	24
US (Billboard 200)	35

== Sources ==
- Davies, Dave (1996). Kink. New York, NY: Hyperion. ISBN 0-7868-8269-7.
- Davies, Ray (1995). X-Ray. New York, NY: Overlook Press. ISBN 0-87951-611-9.
- Hinman, Doug (2004). The Kinks: All Day and All of the Night. Milwaukee, WI: Hal Leonard Corporation. ISBN 0-87930-765-X.
- Kitts, Thomas (2007). Ray Davies: Not Like Everybody Else. London, UK: Routledge. ISBN 978-0-415-97769-2.
- Miller, Andy (2003). The Kinks are the Village Green Preservation Society. London, UK: Continuum International Publishing Group. ISBN 0-8264-1498-2.
- Rogan, Johnny (1998). The Complete Guide to the Music of The Kinks. London, UK: Omnibus Press. ISBN 0-7119-6314-2.
- Turner, Alwyn W. (2003). "The Kinks". In Buckley, Peter (ed.). The Rough Guide to Rock (3rd ed.). London: Rough Guides. pp. 560–561. ISBN 978-1-84353-105-0.
- Lola Versus Powerman and the Moneygoround, Part One (CD reissue). The Kinks. Castle. 1998.
- Lola Versus Powerman and the Moneygoround, Part One (CD reissue). The Kinks. Reprise. 2004.
- Lola Versus Powerman and the Moneygoround, Part One (CD reissue). The Kinks. Sanctuary. 2004.
