= Percy (soundtrack) =

Soundtrack album by the Kinks
- Released: 26 March 1971
- Recorded: October 1970 – January 1971
- Studio: Morgan, London
- Length: 33:03
- Label: Pye
- Producer: Ray Davies

The Kinks UK chronology
Lola Versus Powerman and the Moneygoround, Part One (1970)	Percy (1971)	Muswell Hillbillies (1971)

Singles from Percy
- 1. "God's Children" Released: 1971

Percy is a 1971 film soundtrack for the British comedy film Percy performed by the English rock group the Kinks with additional orchestral arrangements conducted by Stanley Myers. It was released as the band's ninth official studio album. The songs were written by Ray Davies and include both standard rock/pop songs and instrumental numbers.

== Background ==
Percy was the first album the Kinks worked on following the success of "Lola". The idea of creating a soundtrack for the Percy movie was suggested by the band's management. Ray Davies reflected in 2014:

Again, it was a masterpiece of mismanagement! 'Lola' had been a worldwide hit, and America was crying out for us to go back there, but our managers decided it would be nice if we did the soundtrack to a film!

On how the band was selected to record the soundtrack, Davies joked: "Somebody came up to us and asked us to do a film. I'm sure that they looked down the charts and thought, 'Well, who's in the charts this week?"

Aside from Ray Davies, most of the rest of the band were uninterested in the project and sought to rush its completion. Though John Dalton cited the album as one of the band's worst, John Gosling has since referred to it as his favorite Kinks album that he was present on, besides Muswell Hillbillies.

Although some songs, like "The Way Love Used to Be", were written before the band began working on a soundtrack, many of the tracks on the album were based on the themes in the movie. This included the lead single "God's Children", a protest song against interfering with the human condition using science.

"Willesden Green" is the only song released by the Kinks to feature lead vocals by a band member other than a Davies brother. Bassist John Dalton sings lead vocals on the track, doing an impression of Elvis Presley.

== Release and promotion ==
Professional ratings
Review scores
Source	Rating
Allmusic	2/5 stars
Blender	1/5 stars

Percy was not originally released in the US and was the most commonly imported to the US of all of the Kinks' Pye albums. Several tracks from the album appeared in the US on compilations: "God's Children" and "Willesden Green" were included on The Kink Kronikles in 1972, "The Way Love Used to Be" was included on 1973's The Great Lost Kinks Album.

"God's Children" was issued as a single (b/w either "Moments" or "The Way Love Used to Be", depending on the country) in April 1971. Unlike the album, the single was released in the US (in July) but failed to chart there or in the UK. It was a minor hit in Australia (reaching No. 53) and New Zealand (No. 21).

In the UK a 4-track EP was also released featuring "God's Children", "The Way Love Used To Be", "Moments" and "Dreams". This was the Kinks' last release with Pye while they were still under contract.

In 2014 the album was reissued on CD as a deluxe edition with bonus tracks and was paired with Lola Versus Powerman and the Moneygoround, Part One as Lola versus Powerman and The Moneygoround and Percy two CD set. This release was the first of Percy on American market.

The album was reissued on picture disc vinyl for Record Store Day in 2021 as a 50th anniversary edition which was also a vinyl debut of Percy in the US.

== Track listing ==
All tracks are written by Ray Davies.

Side one
No.	Title	Length
1.	"God's Children"	3:16
2.	"Lola" (instrumental blues jam version)	4:46
3.	"The Way Love Used to Be"	2:15
4.	"Completely" (instrumental)	3:41
5.	"Running Round Town" (instrumental)	1:06
6.	"Moments"	2:57

Side two
No.	Title	Length
1.	"Animals in the Zoo"	2:22
2.	"Just Friends"	2:38
3.	"Whip Lady" (instrumental)	1:20
4.	"Dreams"	3:45
5.	"Helga" (instrumental)	1:57
6.	"Willesden Green"	2:27
7.	"God's Children – End" (instrumental)	0:29

CD and digital reissue bonus tracks (mono mixes from the film)
No.	Title	Length
14.	"Dreams" (Film version)	1:38
15.	"Moments" (Film instrumental version)	0:42
16.	"The Way Love Used to Be" (Film instrumental version 1)	0:54
17.	"The Way Love Used to Be" (Film version)	2:04
18.	"The Way Love Used to Be" (Film instrumental version 2)	1:03

2014 deluxe edition bonus tracks
No.	Title	Length
14.	"Dreams" (remix)	3:24
15.	"Lola" (1970 mono single mix)	4:06
16.	"Apeman" (1970 mono single mix)	3:53
17.	"Rats" (1970 mono single mix)	2:42
18.	"Powerman" (mono mix)	4:26
19.	"The Moneygoround" (mono alternative version)	1:41
20.	"Apeman" (mono alternative version)	3:41
21.	"God's Children" (mono film mix)	3:18
22.	"The Way Love Used to Be" (mono film mix)	2:07
23.	"God's Children – End" (mono film mix)	0:50

== Personnel ==
According to band researcher Doug Hinman:

The Kinks

- Ray Davies – lead vocals, acoustic and electric guitars; harmonica ("Completely", "Running Round Town")
- Dave Davies – backing vocals, electric and acoustic guitars
- John Dalton – bass guitar; lead vocals ("Willesden Green")
- Mick Avory – drums
- John Gosling – baby grand piano, Hammond organ, electric piano

Additional musicians

- Stanley Myers – string arrangements
- The Mike Cotton Sound – horns ("Lola")
