= Muswell Hillbilly =

Single by The Kinks

from the album Muswell Hillbillies
- B-side: "Oklahoma U.S.A." (Japan)
- Released: March 1972 (Japanese single); 24 Nov 1971 (US LP); 26 Nov 1971 (UK LP)
- Recorded: Aug–Sep 1971 at Morgan Studios, Willesden, London
- Genre: Country rock
- Length: 4:58
- Label: RCA Victor
- Songwriter: Ray Davies
- Producer: Ray Davies

The Kinks singles chronology
"20th Century Man" (1971)	"Muswell Hillbilly" (1972)	"Supersonic Rocket Ship" (1972)

"Muswell Hillbilly" is a track recorded by British rock band the Kinks. It served as the title track to their 1971 album, Muswell Hillbillies.

== Lyrics and music ==
The lyrics of the track "Muswell Hillbilly" see the singer being forced from his London home and into Muswell Hill, a sterilized suburban community. He says his farewells to his friends, including Rosie Rooke, who "wore her Sunday hat so she'd impress [the singer]". The singer says that "they're gonna try and make [him] change [his] way of living, but they'll never make [him] something that [he's] not", likely referring to the government. He goes on to say, "I'm a Muswell Hillbilly boy, but my heart lies in old West Virginia. Never seen New Orleans, Oklahoma, Tennessee, [but] still I dream of the Black Hills that I ain't never seen." He explains that "they're putting us in little boxes, No character, just uniformity. They're trying to build a computerised community", but vows that "they'll never make a zombie out of me."

The song, like most of the Muswell Hillbillies album, has a country rock flavour. It also has an antiquated style, mostly attributed to the fact that the entire album was recorded with ten-year-old equipment. Ray Davies handles the lead vocal.

Dave Davies commented on the song, "There's that love and fondness for Americana and for country music because I had quite a big family, and all the great films like South Pacific and Oklahoma! – all these influences from the States – were embedded in our culture when growing up. It was kind of like a London version of The Beverly Hillbillies in a humorous way."

== Release ==
Prior to its release, Kinks member Ray Davies intended for the track to be the opening track of a possible film adaptation of the album. However, RCA refused to finance this project, and it was scrapped.

"Muswell Hillbilly" was first released on the Muswell Hillbillies album in 1971, where it was the twelfth and final track. The following year, "Muswell Hillbilly" was released as a single in Japan, backed with "Oklahoma U.S.A.". It has since appeared multiple times on other albums, including Picture Book. It also appeared in live format on Everybody's in Show-Biz (the follow-up to Muswell Hillbillies) and To the Bone.

== Reception ==
"Muswell Hillbilly" has generally received positive reviews. Thomas Kitts wrote in his book, Ray Davies: Not Like Everybody Else, that "'Muswell Hillbilly' brings together [the Muswell Hillbillies album's] various musical and thematic motifs." AllMusic's Stephen Thomas Erlewine cited the track as a highlight from the Muswell Hillbillies album. However, in a more critical analysis of the song, Mike Saunders of Rolling Stone said, "The country stuff [on Muswell Hillbillies] is another matter. A portion of it is fine, but some of the songs are so positively uninspired and unenergetic it drives me up the wall. Such as things like the Kinks nasally whining 'I'm a Muswell hillbilly boy, But my heart lies in old West Virginia.'"
