= Everybody's in Show-Biz =

Studio album / live album by the Kinks
- Released: 1 September 1972
- Recorded: 2–3 March 1972 (live); March–June 1972 (studio)
- Venue: Carnegie Hall, New York City
- Studio: Morgan, London
- Genre: Rock
- Length: 69:26
- Label: RCA
- Producer: Ray Davies

The Kinks UK chronology
Muswell Hillbillies (1971)	Everybody's in Show-Biz (1972)	Preservation Act 1 (1973)

The Kinks US chronology
The Kink Kronikles (1972)	Everybody's in Show-Biz (1972)	The Great Lost Kinks Album (1973)

Singles from Everybody's in Show-Biz
- 1. "Supersonic Rocket Ship" Released: 5 May 1972; 2. "Celluloid Heroes" Released: 24 November 1972

Professional ratings
Review scores
Source	Rating
AllMusic	3.5/5 stars
Christgau's Record Guide	B+
Pitchfork Media	(9.5/10)
Rolling Stone	(favourable)

Everybody's in Show-Biz is the eleventh studio album released by the English rock group the Kinks, released in 1972. A double album, the first disc features studio recordings, while the second disc documents a two-night Carnegie Hall stand.

This album marks Davies' explorations of the trials of rock-star life and the monotony of touring, themes that would reappear in future releases like The Kinks Present A Soap Opera and the 1987 live album Live: The Road.

On 3 June 2016, a Legacy Edition was released, with disc 1 containing the original stereo album (studio and live tracks) and disc 2 containing bonus tracks including previously unreleased live tracks from the Carnegie Hall concerts, alternate mixes and studio outtakes. (Disc 2 tracks 6–10 were recorded on the other night of the two-night Carnegie Hall stand; Disc 2 track 14 is a previously unreleased outtake; and Disc 2 tracks 1 and 12 are the same as those bonus tracks on the 1998 reissue.)

== Track listing ==
All tracks are written by Ray Davies, except where noted.

Side one (studio)
No.	Title	Length
1.	"Here Comes Yet Another Day"	3:53
2.	"Maximum Consumption"	4:04
3.	"Unreal Reality"	3:32
4.	"Hot Potatoes"	3:25
5.	"Sitting in My Hotel"	3:20
Total length:		18:14

Side two (studio)
No.	Title	Length
1.	"Motorway"	3:28
2.	"You Don't Know My Name" (Dave Davies)	2:34
3.	"Supersonic Rocket Ship"	3:29
4.	"Look a Little on the Sunny Side"	2:47
5.	"Celluloid Heroes"	6:19
Total length:		18:37

Side three (live at Carnegie Hall, New York City, New York, 2–3 March 1972)
No.	Title	Length
1.	"Top of the Pops"	4:33
2.	"Brainwashed"	2:59
3.	"Mr. Wonderful" (Jerry Bock, George David Weiss, Lawrence Holofcener)	0:42
4.	"Acute Schizophrenia Paranoia Blues"	4:00
5.	"Holiday"	3:53
Total length:		16:07

Side four (live at Carnegie Hall, New York City, New York, 2–3 March 1972)
No.	Title	Length
1.	"Muswell Hillbilly"	3:10
2.	"Alcohol"	5:19
3.	"Banana Boat Song" (Irving Burgie, William Attaway)	1:42
4.	"Skin and Bone"	3:54
5.	"Baby Face" (Benny Davis, Harry Akst)	1:54
6.	"Lola"	1:40
Total length:		17:39

== Personnel ==
The Kinks

- Ray Davies – lead vocals, acoustic guitar, resonator guitar
- Dave Davies – lead guitar, slide guitar, banjo, backing vocals, 12-string acoustic guitar on "Celluloid Heroes", lead vocal on "You Don't Know My Name", co-lead vocals on "Hot Potatoes"
- John Dalton – bass guitar, backing vocals
- Mick Avory – drums
- John Gosling – keyboards

Additional personnel

- Alan Holmes – saxophone, clarinet
- Mike Cotton – trumpet
- John Beecham – trombone, tuba
- Dave Rowberry – organ on "Celluloid Heroes"
