= Got to Be Free =

Song by the Kinks

from the album Lola Versus Powerman and the Moneygoround, Part One
- Released: 27 November 1970
- Recorded: 1970
- Studio: Morgan, Willesden, London
- Genre: Rock
- Length: 3:01
- Songwriter: Ray Davies
- Producer: Ray Davies

Lola Versus Powerman and the Moneygoround, Part One track listing
- 13 tracks Side one: 1. "The Contenders"; 2. "Strangers"; 3. "Denmark Street"; 4. "Get Back in Line"; 5. "Lola"; 6. "Top of the Pops"; 7. "The Moneygoround"; Side two: 8. "This Time Tomorrow"; 9. "A Long Way From Home"; 10. "Rats"; 11. "Apeman"; 12. "Powerman"; 13. "Got to Be Free"

"Got to Be Free" is a song written by Ray Davies and performed by British rock band the Kinks. It was released on their 1970 LP Lola versus Powerman and the Moneygoround, Part One, which included the Top 10 hit song "Lola". "Got to Be Free" plays a key role in the concept album, as the album borrows its first verse as an introduction, and closes with the full song. The song was also used in the first of the BBC's Play for Today series The Long Distance Piano Player (1970), which featured the song's own writer, Ray Davies, in the lead role.

== Overview ==
Overall, the lyrics express a feeling of longing for a better world, or one devoid of all the troubles and restrictions of this one ("We've got to get out of this world somehow"). The lyrics also act as a commentary on the music business, a recurring theme in Lola versus Powerman and the Moneygoround, Part One). "Got to Be Free" opens as a kind of lullaby ("Hush little baby/Don't you cry"), the same lyrics and tune as the album's introduction on side A, but soon changes to a more standard rock song structure, with a rousing chorus of "Got to be free to say what I want/Make what I want and play what I want" (with minor changes as the song progresses, such as "laugh when I want" and "do what I want").

== Instrumentation ==
The song begins with some gentle strumming on Ray Davies' signature National Steel resonator guitar. Soon, a banjo joins in played by regular lead guitarist and brother to Ray, Dave Davies. As the song progresses, the drums and other electric instruments kick in. The song continues, and fades away at three minutes in length.

The song differs slightly from many of the other songs on its LP, with slight country and bluegrass accents at the beginning. It eventually evolves into a more powerful rock song feel, but these influences remain apparent throughout its length. The Kinks would go on to experiment with these genres heavily on their next LP, Muswell Hillbillies.

== Bibliography ==
- All Day and All of the Night, a definitive day-by-day guide to The Kinks, by Doug Hinman
- The complete guide to the music of the Kinks, by Johnny Rogan
