= Strangers (The Kinks song) =

Song by the Kinks

from the album Lola Versus Powerman and the Moneygoround, Part One
- Released: 27 November 1970
- Recorded: August–September 1970
- Studio: Morgan, Willesden, London
- Genre: Folk; rock; pop
- Length: 3:22
- Label: Pye (UK); Reprise (US)
- Songwriter: Dave Davies
- Producer: Ray Davies

Lola Versus Powerman and the Moneygoround, Part One track listing
- 13 tracks Side one: 1. "The Contenders"; 2. "Strangers"; 3. "Denmark Street"; 4. "Get Back in Line"; 5. "Lola"; 6. "Top of the Pops"; 7. "The Moneygoround"; Side two: 8. "This Time Tomorrow"; 9. "A Long Way From Home"; 10. "Rats"; 11. "Apeman"; 12. "Powerman"; 13. "Got to Be Free"

Audio sample
- file; help

"Strangers" is a song written by Dave Davies and performed by English rock group the Kinks. It was released in November 1970 on the Kinks' LP record album Lola Versus Powerman and the Moneygoround, Part One, which is best known for producing the hit single "Lola". "Strangers" is one of two tracks written by Dave Davies on the album, the other being "Rats". He has said that the song is about an old school friend who died of a drug overdose.

Although never released as a single, it has remained popular with fans to this day, especially after it was used in the 2007 Wes Anderson film The Darjeeling Limited (along with two other album tracks written by Ray Davies, "This Time Tomorrow" and "Powerman"). Portions of the song were also used in season 3, episode 8 of the AppleTV series Ted Lasso entitled "We'll Never Have Paris" as well as season 4, episode 4 of the Fox series The Last Man on Earth, "Wisconsin."

A cover of the song recorded live by Norah Jones was included as a bonus track on the deluxe edition of her 2009 album The Fall. A cover by Feist was released on the CD included with the DVD of her documentary Look at What the Light Did Now. Indie folk rock duo Wye Oak performed a version of the song in May 2010 for The A.V. Club's A.V. Undercover web series. It has also been covered by alternative rock supergroup Golden Smog on their album Another Fine Day, Indie rock band Piebald, folk band Crooked Fingers, punk singer Ben Weasel on his first solo album Fidatevi, folk pop band Lucius on the extended edition of their 2016 album Good Grief, and by Black Pumas on the 2021 "Expanded Deluxe Edition" of their self-titled album.

== Personnel ==
- Dave Davies – vocals, acoustic guitar
- John Gosling – grand piano, Hammond organ
- John Dalton – bass guitar
- Mick Avory – drums
