= Rats (The Kinks song) =

Single by The Kinks

from the album Lola versus Powerman and the Moneygoround, Part One
- A-side: "Apeman" (R. Davies)
- Released: November 20, 1970 (UK); December 16, 1970 (U.S.)
- Recorded: Aug–Sep 1970 at Morgan Studios, Willesden, London
- Genre: Hard rock
- Length: 2:40
- Label: Pye 7N 45016 (UK); Reprise 0979 (U.S.)
- Songwriter: Dave Davies
- Producer: Ray Davies

The Kinks singles chronology
"Lola" (1970)	"Rats" (1970)	"God's Children" (1971)

Lola Versus Powerman and the Moneygoround, Part One track listing
- 13 tracks Side one: 1. "The Contenders"; 2. "Strangers"; 3. "Denmark Street"; 4. "Get Back in Line"; 5. "Lola"; 6. "Top of the Pops"; 7. "The Moneygoround"; Side two: 8. "This Time Tomorrow"; 9. "A Long Way From Home"; 10. "Rats"; 11. "Apeman"; 12. "Powerman"; 13. "Got to Be Free"

"Rats" is a song written by Dave Davies and performed by the Kinks on their album Lola Versus Powerman and the Moneygoround, Part One. It is the tenth song on the album, and has a duration of 2:40. John Dalton's bass work is a notable aspect of the song.

== Overview ==
"Rats" is one of two songs by Davies on Lola vs Powerman, the other being "Strangers". It contrasts heavily with some of the other tracks on the album, featuring heavy guitar chords and fast-paced vocals. "Rats" marks an end somewhat to Dave Davies' contributions to Kinks albums, as ones preceding Lola versus Powerman and beginning with Kinda Kinks usually included one or two songs credited to Davies.

== Single release ==
It was released as a B-side to "Apeman", which turned out to be a successful single in the UK, peaking at No. 5. While not as successful as its sister single Lola in the US, it did chart in the top 50 (see positions below).

== Peak chart positions ==
- 5 United Kingdom
- 9 Australia
- 19 Canada
- 45 United States
