= List of number-one hits of 1981 (Flanders) =

These hits topped the Ultratop 50 in the Flanders region of Belgium in 1981.

Issue date	Song	Artist
3 January	"Santa Maria"	Roland Kaiser
10 January	"Santa Maria"	Roland Kaiser
17 January	"Santa Maria"	Roland Kaiser
24 January	"Santa Maria"	Roland Kaiser
31 January	"Santa Maria"	Roland Kaiser
7 February	"Lola (Live)"	The Kinks
14 February	"Stars on 45"	Stars on 45
21 February	"Stars on 45"	Stars on 45
28 February	"Shine Up"	Doris D and the Pins
7 March	"Stars on 45"	Stars on 45
14 March	"Stars on 45"	Stars on 45
21 March	"Stars on 45"	Stars on 45
28 March	"Stars on 45"	Stars on 45
4 April	"Shaddap You Face"	Joe Dolce Musical Theatre
11 April	"Shaddap You Face"	Joe Dolce Musical Theatre
18 April	"Shaddap You Face"	Joe Dolce Musical Theatre
25 April	"Vienna"	Ultravox
2 May	"Vienna"	Ultravox
9 May	"Vienna"	Ultravox
16 May	"Making Your Mind Up"	Bucks Fizz
23 May	"Making Your Mind Up"	Bucks Fizz
30 May	"Making Your Mind Up"	Bucks Fizz
6 June	"Can You Feel It"	The Jacksons
13 June	"How 'Bout Us"	Champaign
20 June	"How 'Bout Us"	Champaign
27 June	"I've Seen That Face Before (Libertango)"	Grace Jones
4 July	"I've Seen That Face Before (Libertango)"	Grace Jones
11 July	"I've Seen That Face Before (Libertango)"	Grace Jones
18 July	"Only Crying"	Keith Marshall
25 July	"Only Crying"	Keith Marshall
1 August	"Only Crying"	Keith Marshall
8 August	"Only Crying"	Keith Marshall
15 August	"Caribbean Disco Club"	Lobo
22 August	"Caribbean Disco Club"	Lobo
29 August	"One Day in Your Life"	Michael Jackson
5 September	"One Day in Your Life"	Michael Jackson
12 September	"Wordy Rappinghood"	Tom Tom Club
19 September	"One Day in Your Life"	Michael Jackson
26 September	"One Day in Your Life"	Michael Jackson
3 October	"Japanese Boy"	Aneka
10 October	"Japanese Boy"	Aneka
17 October	"Why Tell Me Why"	Anita Meyer
24 October	"Why Tell Me Why"	Anita Meyer
31 October	"Why Tell Me Why"	Anita Meyer
7 November	"Why Tell Me Why"	Anita Meyer
14 November	"Tainted Love"	Soft Cell
21 November	"Tainted Love"	Soft Cell
28 November	"Tainted Love"	Soft Cell
5 December	"Physical"	Olivia Newton-John
12 December	"Pretend"	Alvin Stardust
19 December	"Pretend"	Alvin Stardust
26 December	"Why Do Fools Fall in Love"	Diana Ross

== See also ==
- 1981 in music
