= Muswell Hillbillies =

Studio album by the Kinks
- Released: 24 November 1971
- Recorded: August–October 1971
- Studios: Morgan, London
- Genres: Country rock; music hall
- Length: 44:38
- Label: RCA
- Producer: Ray Davies

The Kinks UK chronology
Percy (1971)	Muswell Hillbillies (1971)	Everybody's in Show-Biz (1972)

The Kinks US chronology
Lola Versus Powerman and the Moneygoround, Part One (1970)	Muswell Hillbillies (1971)	The Kink Kronikles (1972)

Singles from Muswell Hillbillies
- 1. "20th Century Man" Released: December 1971

Muswell Hillbillies is the tenth studio album by the English rock group the Kinks. Released on 24 November 1971, it was the band's first album released through RCA Records. The album is named after the Muswell Hill area of North London, where band leader Ray Davies and guitarist Dave Davies grew up and the band formed in the early 1960s.

The album introduces a number of working class figures and the stresses with which they must contend. It did not sell well but received critical acclaim and lasting fan appreciation.

== Recording ==
Muswell Hillbillies was the band's first album for RCA Records, their prior recordings having been released on Pye Records (Reprise Records in the United States). Their contract with Pye/Reprise expired the same year. The album was recorded between August and October 1971 at Morgan Studios, London, using a new brass section, the Mike Cotton Sound, which included Mike Cotton on trumpet, John Beecham on trombone and tuba, and Alan Holmes on clarinet.

== Reception ==
Professional ratings
Review scores
Source	Rating
AllMusic	4.5/5 stars
Blender	4/5 stars
Christgau's Record Guide	B+
Drowned in Sound	10/10
Pitchfork	8.9/10
Rolling Stone	(favourable)
The Encyclopedia of Popular Music	5/5 stars
Uncut	5/5 stars

The album was not a commercial success (it failed to chart in the United Kingdom and peaked at No. 100 in the US), and its sales were a disappointment following the success of "Lola" the previous year. Stereo Review magazine called the poor-selling record "album of the year" in 1972 (even though it was released on 24 November 1971). In the 1984 Rolling Stone Album Guide, Rolling Stone editors gave the album five stars out of five and called it Davies' "signature statement" as a songwriter. In a retrospective review for AllMusic, Stephen Thomas Erlewine called the album a wide-ranging collection of Ray Davies compositions which focus on the tensions and frustrations of modern life.

== Re-releases ==
The album was reissued on CD in 1998 with two previously unreleased bonus tracks: "Mountain Woman" and "Kentucky Moon".

A remastered deluxe edition of Muswell Hillbillies was released in the UK on 7 October 2013, with a bonus CD of alternate takes, and BBC recordings all remastered by Andrew Sandoval and Dan Hersch.

On 10 November 2014, the album was reissued in the United States as CD/DVD Legacy Edition. The CD featured nine bonus tracks, most of which were taken from the 2013 deluxe edition, while the DVD featured promotional TV performances from the era (previously released in the UK on The Kinks at the BBC box set).

In 2022 Muswell Hillbillies was remastered and reissued with three previously unreleased bonus tracks.

== Artwork ==
The front cover picture was taken by Rod Shone in the Archway Tavern, a pub in Archway (more than two miles away from Muswell Hill). The back insert picture, showing the band below a signpost giving directions to Muswell Hill, was taken on the small traffic island at the intersection of Castle Yard and Southwood Lane in Highgate.

== Track listing ==
All tracks are written by Ray Davies.

Side one
No.	Title	Length
1.	"20th Century Man"	5:57
2.	"Acute Schizophrenia Paranoia Blues"	3:32
3.	"Holiday"	2:40
4.	"Skin and Bone"	3:39
5.	"Alcohol"	3:35
6.	"Complicated Life"	4:02

Side two
No.	Title	Length
1.	"Here Come the People in Grey"	3:46
2.	"Have a Cuppa Tea"	3:45
3.	"Holloway Jail"	3:29
4.	"Oklahoma U.S.A."	2:38
5.	"Uncle Son"	2:33
6.	"Muswell Hillbilly"	4:58

1998 CD reissue bonus tracks
No.	Title	Length
13.	"Mountain Woman"	3:08
14.	"Kentucky Moon"	3:57

2013 deluxe edition bonus CD
No.	Title	Length
1.	"Lavender Lane"	3:48
2.	"Mountain Woman"	3:09
3.	"Have a Cuppa Tea" (Alternate Version)	3:33
4.	"Muswell Hillbilly" (1976 Remix)	3:48
5.	"Uncle Son" (Alternate Version)	2:44
6.	"Kentucky Moon"	3:56
7.	"Nobody's Fool" (Demo Version)	2:28
8.	"20th Century Man" (Alternate Instrumental Take)	3:02
9.	"20th Century Man" (1976 Remix)	5:02
10.	"Queenie"	3:43
11.	"Acute Schizophrenia Paranoia Blues" (Live At Kensington House – 1972)	3:48
12.	"Holiday" (Live At Kensington House – 1972)	3:08
13.	"Skin and Bone" (Live At Kensington House – 1972)	2:34

- Tracks 1, 3, 5 recorded on 20 Sep 1971
- Tracks 2, 6 recorded on 16 Oct 1971
- Tracks 4, 9 recorded Aug–Sep 1971
- Tracks 7, 8 recorded on 6 Oct 1971
- Track 10 recorded Sep 1971
- Tracks 11–13 recorded at BBC John Peel Sessions, 16 May 1972
- All tracks are in stereo except 7, 11–13 in mono; Tracks 1, 3, 5, 7, 8, 10 are previously unreleased

2014 US Legacy Edition bonus tracks
No.	Title	Length
13.	"Lavender Lane"	3:49
14.	"Mountain Woman"	3:08
15.	"Have a Cuppa Tea" (alternate version)	3:34
16.	"Uncle Son" (alternate version)	2:45
17.	"Kentucky Moon"	3:56
18.	"Nobody's Fool" (demo)	2:28
19.	"20th Century Man" (alternate instrumental take)	3:06
20.	"Queenie" (backing track)	3:46
21.	"Muswell Hillbillies Radio Spot"	0:51

2022 reissue bonus tracks
No.	Title	Length
13.	"20th Century Man" (2022 Mix)	6:10
14.	"Acute Schizophrenia Paranoia Blues" (2022 Mix)	3:31
15.	"Travelling With My Band" (2022 Mix)	3:13

== Personnel ==
Track numbering refers to CD and digital releases of the album.

The Kinks

- Ray Davies – lead vocals, acoustic guitar, resonator guitar
- Dave Davies – lead guitar, slide guitar, banjo, backing vocals
- John Dalton – bass guitar, backing vocals
- Mick Avory – drums, percussion
- John Gosling – piano (acoustic and electric), Hammond organ, accordion

Additional personnel

- Mike Cotton – trumpet
- John Beecham – trombone, tuba
- Alan Holmes – saxophone, clarinet
- Vicki Brown – backing vocals on tracks 4 and 9
- Ken Jones – harmonica on track 7
- Mike Bobak – engineer
- Richard Edwards – engineer
