= The Darjeeling Limited (soundtrack) =

The Darjeeling Limited: Original Soundtrack

Soundtrack album by various artists
- Released: September 25, 2007
- Genres: Film score Rock; Classical
- Length: 55:48
- Label: ABKCO Records
- Producers: Wes Anderson; Randall Poster

Professional ratings
Review scores
Source	Rating
Allmusic	3.5/5 stars

The Darjeeling Limited: Original Soundtrack is the soundtrack album for the Wes Anderson film, The Darjeeling Limited. The album features three songs by The Kinks, "Powerman", "Strangers" and "This Time Tomorrow", all from the 1970 album Lola versus Powerman and the Moneygoround, Part One, as well as "Play With Fire" by The Rolling Stones. Most of the album, however, features film score music composed by Bengali filmmaker Satyajit Ray and other artists from the cinema of India. The works include "Charu's Theme", from Ray's 1964 film, Charulata.

The film is the first of Anderson's not to feature music by Mark Mothersbaugh. The Darjeeling Limited is the first Wes Anderson soundtrack album to feature a song by The Rolling Stones (though Bottle Rocket, Rushmore, and The Royal Tenenbaums all featured Rolling Stones songs, contractual reasons prevented the songs from appearing on the soundtrack albums).

== Track listing ==
No.	Title	Artist(s)	Duration	Notes
1	"Where Do You Go To (My Lovely)"	Peter Sarstedt	4:38	from his self-titled album
2	"Title Music"	Vilayat Khan	2:25	from Satyajit Ray's film Jalsaghar
3	"This Time Tomorrow"	The Kinks	3:25	from their album Lola Versus Powerman and the Moneygoround, Part One
4	"Title Music"	Satyajit Ray	1:25	from Satyajit Ray's Teen Kanya
5	"Title Music"	Jyotitindra Moitra & Ustad Ali Akbar Khan	1:37	from Merchant-Ivory's film The Householder
6	"Ruku's Room"	Satyajit Ray	0:49	from Satyajit Ray's film Joi Baba Felunath
7	"Charu's Theme"	Satyajit Ray	1:01	from Satyajit Ray's film Charulata
8	"Title Music"	Shankar Jaikishan	2:33	from Merchant-Ivory's film Bombay Talkie
9	"Montage"	Satyajit Ray	1:15	from Nityananda Datta's film Baksa Badal
10	"Prayer" (traditional)	Jodhpur Sikh Temple Congregation	1:07	Song from the film's soundtrack
11	"Farewell to Earnest"	Jyotitindra Moitra	1:59	from Merchant-Ivory's film The Householder
12	"The Deserted Ballroom"	Satyajit Ray	0:46	from Merchant-Ivory's film Shakespeare Wallah
13	"Suite Bergamasque: 3. Clair de Lune" Claude Debussy	Alexis Weissenberg	4:57	from his album Weissenberg Plays Debussy
14	"Typewriter Tip, Tip, Tip"	Shankar Jaikishan	4:37	from Merchant-Ivory's film Bombay Talkie
15	"Memorial" (traditional)	Narlai Village Troubador	1:26	Song from the film's soundtrack
16	"Strangers"	The Kinks	3:20	from their album Lola Versus Powerman and the Moneygoround, Part One
17	"Praise Him" (traditional)	Udaipur Convent School Nuns And Students	0:43	Song from the film's soundtrack
18	"Symphony No. 7 in A (Op 92) Allegro Con Brio" Ludwig van Beethoven	Fritz Reiner and Chicago Symphony Orchestra	6:48	Non-album track
19	"Play With Fire"	The Rolling Stones	2:15	from their album Out of Our Heads
20	"Arrival in Benaras"	Ustad Vilayat Khan	1:44	from Merchant-Ivory's film The Guru
21	"Powerman"	The Kinks	4:19	from their album Lola Versus Powerman and the Moneygoround, Part One
22	"Les Champs-Élysées"	Joe Dassin	2:39	from his album Les Champs-Élysées
