= 20th Century Man =

Single by the Kinks

from the album Muswell Hillbillies
- B-side: "Skin and Bone"
- Released: Dec 1971 (single); 24 Nov 1971 (US LP); 26 Nov 1971 (UK LP)
- Recorded: Aug–Sep 1971
- Studio: Morgan (London)
- Genre: Rock
- Length: 5:57 (album); 4:57 (Celluloid Heroes LP); 3:57 (single)
- Label: RCA Victor 74-0620
- Songwriter: Ray Davies
- Producer: Ray Davies

The Kinks singles chronology
"God's Children" (1971)	"20th Century Man" (1971)	"Supersonic Rocket Ship" (1972)

"20th Century Man" is a song recorded by the English rock band the Kinks. It was released as a single in December 1971 from the band's 1971 LP Muswell Hillbillies, an album with blues and country roots. It centered on such themes as poverty, housing development, alienation, the welfare state, and other troubles of the modern world.

== Synopsis ==
[I wanted it to sound like I] was the last man on the block, who doesn't want his house torn down.

— Ray Davies, Muswell Hillbillies Liner Notes

In "20th Century Man", the singer expresses his regrets and worries about the modern world, criticizing technology, the state bureaucracy, and modern art; in the latter, he claims to prefer time-honored masters such as William Shakespeare, Rembrandt van Rijn, Titian, Leonardo da Vinci and Thomas Gainsborough to more recent artists. Davies later said the song was inspired by the "breakdown of community" preceding World War II, elaborating, "Communities are still breaking down now but for other reasons. You go into a restaurant expecting to see people having dinner with one another and they're all looking at their iPhones. That's me being a bit grumpy".

Dave Davies reflected on the song's resonance, "One of my favorite Ray songs. It's an important song, not just on this album, but any album, and it's still valid today. It's a very perceptive track with a great feel. It was a privilege to be a part of it. We were trying to get a sort of thoughtful, 'Well, what's going to happen?' kind of mood."

== Instrumentation ==
"20th Century Man" is a slight departure from the rest of the songs on Muswell Hillbillies, with a heavier rock sound and beat. It begins with a gentle strum on the acoustic guitar, but slowly rises and changes into a powerful rock song. Whilst the rest of Muswell Hillbillies featured purposely dated recording techniques, to give it an antiquated feel, "20th Century Man" was recorded separately with then modern recording equipment.

Though less indebted to retro stylings than much of the rest of the album, the song prominently features a slide guitar part played by Dave Davies. He explained, "We were trying to ... keep the instruments more subdued. That's where I thought the slide guitar came in handy, and it really changes the mood."

== Single release ==
"20th Century Man" was released as a single in December 1971 in the US (it would never see single release in the UK), and was backed by "Skin and Bone". It failed to gain a significant hold on the charts, not managing to reach the Billboard Hot 100, peaking at number 106. The single reached number 9 in Boston, and number 113 on the Cash Box "Looking Ahead" survey.

== Versions ==
Multiple versions and edits of "20th Century Man" exist. On the original Muswell Hillbillies full-length version, the length is 5:57. In the case of the 7" single, the length is two minutes shorter, at about 3:57. On the "Greatest Hits" compilation The Kinks' Greatest: Celluloid Heroes an edit of about 4:57 is present. A live version, which omits some of the lyrics in the bridge of the studio recording, is included on the Kinks' 1980 album One for the Road. Ray Davies also performed the song in his 1996–1997 "Storyteller" show in support of his semi-fictionalized autobiography X-Ray, a recording of which was released on the album, The Storyteller, in 1998.

== Personnel ==
- Ray Davies – acoustic guitar, lead vocals
- Dave Davies – lead guitar, slide guitar, backing vocals
- John Dalton – bass guitar
- Mick Avory – drums, percussion
- John Gosling – keyboards
- Mike Cotton – trumpet*
- John Beecham – trombone, tuba*
- Mike Bodak; Richard Edwards – engineer

*Not present on this track, but part of the group on other tracks on the album
