= This Time Tomorrow (song) =

Song by the Kinks

from the album Lola Versus Powerman and the Moneygoround, Part One
- Released: 27 November 1970
- Recorded: 1970
- Studio: Morgan, Willesden, London
- Length: 3:01
- Songwriter: Ray Davies
- Producer: Ray Davies

Lola Versus Powerman and the Moneygoround, Part One track listing
- 13 tracks Side one: 1. "The Contenders"; 2. "Strangers"; 3. "Denmark Street"; 4. "Get Back in Line"; 5. "Lola"; 6. "Top of the Pops"; 7. "The Moneygoround"; Side two: 8. "This Time Tomorrow"; 9. "A Long Way From Home"; 10. "Rats"; 11. "Apeman"; 12. "Powerman"; 13. "Got to Be Free"

"This Time Tomorrow" is the eighth track from the Kinks' 1970 album, Lola Versus Powerman and the Moneygoround, Part One. It was written by Ray Davies.

== Lyrics and music ==
Ray Davies said of the song's inspiration:

I felt that I'd lost contact with my family. Because I'd been in a pop music bubble for five years, and I didn't know the people around me anymore. 'This Time Tomorrow' was about transience, and an ephemeral world. Clouds, and where do we play tomorrow, and what am I doing as a person tomorrow? It's a floating song, and I was floating into a different era. Going with the flow for a while, until I work out where I want to be.

"This Time Tomorrow", like most of the other tracks on Lola Versus Powerman and the Moneygoround, Part One, criticizes the music business. More specifically, the track complains of the monotony of being on the road. The singer, who is currently on a plane, wonders where he'll be "this time tomorrow." He fantasizes over what the future holds for him, pondering whether he'll still be on the plane, "watching an in-flight movie show", and dreaming of being "on a spaceship somewhere sailing across an empty sea." He'll "leave the sun behind [him] and watch the clouds as they sadly pass [him] by," and says he "can see the world and it ain't so big at all." "I don't know where I'm going, I don't want to see," the singer laments.

"This Time Tomorrow" opens with the sound of an aeroplane flying, followed by guitar and a National Steel resonator guitar. The song also features Kinks pianist John Gosling, with the song being one of Gosling's first ever appearances on a Kinks record. In fact, the song was among the tracks that Gosling attempted the first day he auditioned for the Kinks.

== Release and reception ==
"This Time Tomorrow" was first featured as the opening track on the second side of the Lola Versus Powerman and the Moneygoround, Part One album, and was not released as a single.

"This Time Tomorrow" has generally received positive reviews from critics. In his album review, Stephen Thomas Erlewine of AllMusic called the song one of "three of [Ray Davies's] best melancholy ballads" on Lola Versus Powerman (the other two being "Get Back in Line" and "A Long Way From Home"). Andrew Hickey said in his book, Preservation: The Kinks' Music 1964–1974, that the song is "one of the most affecting songs on the album" and "endlessly listenable".

== Film appearances ==
"This Time Tomorrow" appeared alongside "Strangers", and "Powerman" in the Wes Anderson 2007 film The Darjeeling Limited. These songs were added to the film's soundtrack album. Paste Magazine placed this appearance at number nine on its list of the thirteen "Great Musical Moments in Wes Anderson Movies." In 2005, "This Time Tomorrow" made an appearance in the French Philippe Garrel film Les amants réguliers.

In May 2014, a cover of the song by Gaz Coombes was used in a TV advertisement "Never Standing Still" to mark the 150th anniversary of retailer John Lewis. In 2020, the Kinks recording features during the end credits of episode 2 ("Gloria") of the TV series Mrs. America. In 2024, it was featured in episode 3 of the series Say Nothing on FX.
