= Lee Towers =

Dutch singer

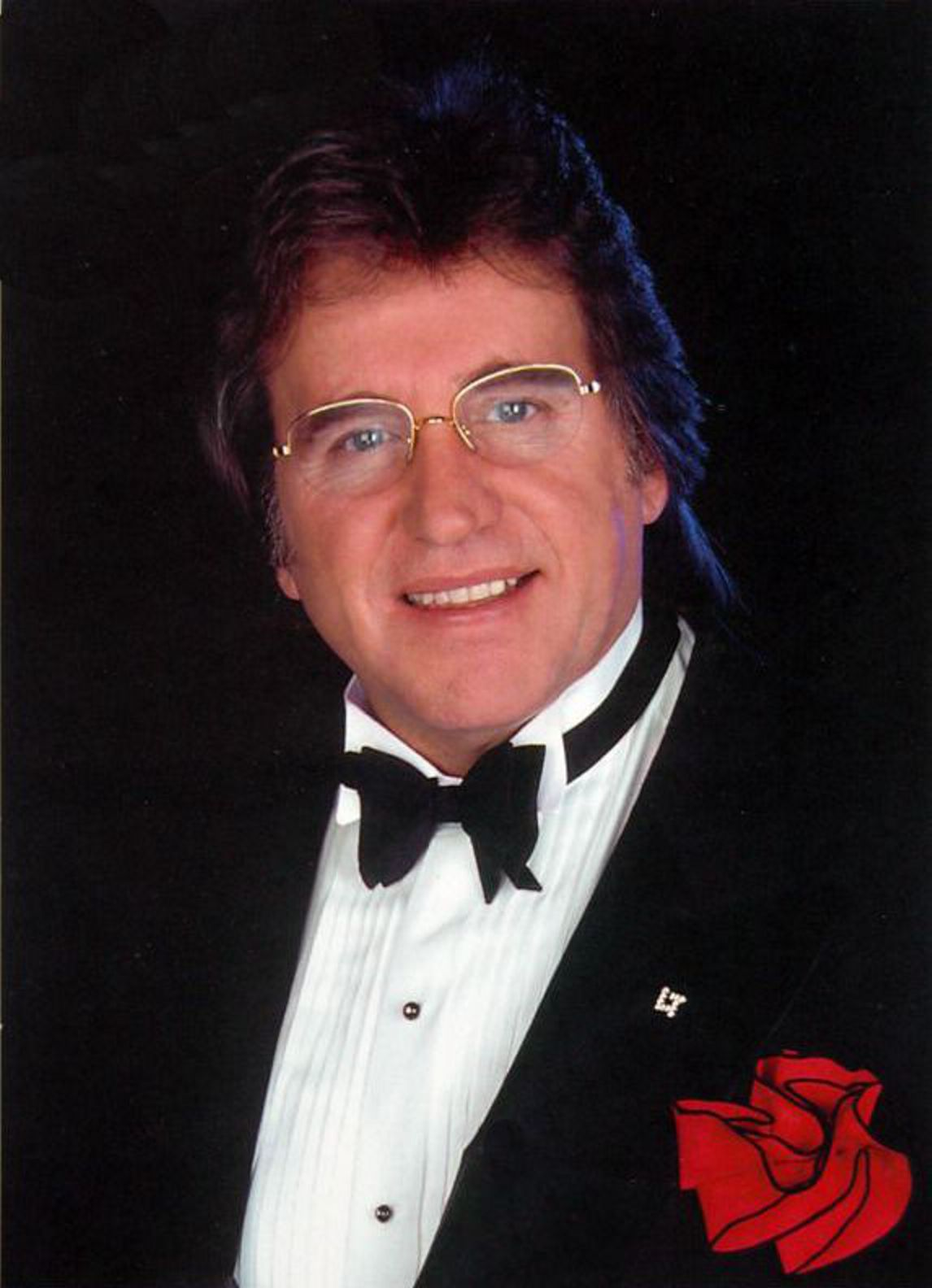
- Lee Towers (1995-2000)
- Born: Leendert Huijzer; 23 March 1946 (age 80); Bolnes, Netherlands
- Other names: The Voice of Rotterdam; Mr. You'll Never Walk Alone
- Occupation: Singer
- Years active: 1975–present
- Spouse: Laura
- Website: LeeTowers.nl

Leendert "Leen" Huijzer (Dutch pronunciation: [ˈleːndərt leːn ˈɦœyzər]; born 23 March 1946), better known by his stage name Lee Towers, is a Dutch singer with international success. He remains one of the best-selling Dutch artists, and held the record for the most concerts performed by a single artist at Rotterdam Ahoy, until it was taken by Frans Bauer in 2024.

== Career ==
Towers' performing range has included pop, show tunes, country, soul and gospel.

He was discovered in 1975 as "The Singing Crane Mechanic", while laboring as a dockworker in Rotterdam. His music has charted in the Dutch music charts successfully from the early 1970s up until the present day.

He is well known in the Netherlands for bringing large theatrical performances to his fans in the style of Las Vegas shows. He holds a record in the Netherlands for performing the most concerts for a single artist at one single venue. Since the 1980s, Towers has held 50 gala performances at Rotterdam Ahoy, a multi-purpose arena, which now hosts a bronze bust of him at the entrance. Towers was initially part of the show orchestra Len Hauser & the Drifting Five and broke through in 1975 when he was presented by Willem Duys as the singing crane operator from Rotterdam (however he worked as a maintenance bank worker at the Boele shipyard in Bolnes). He recorded his first single, "Louisa", under the name Leen Huizer. Later, around 1971, there was the Dutch single "Nina Nina Nina", which he released under the name Len Hauser. Willem Duys released the first single performed under the name Lee Towers on the radio program "Music Mosaic"; the song was "It's Raining in My Heart", composed by the lead singer of the Outsiders, Wally Tax. "It's Raining in My Heart" made it to the charts. The next single, "You'll Never Walk Alone" (released as "You Never Walk Alone"), became Towers' biggest hit and was in the top 10 for weeks.

Towers gave his first major concert in De Doelen in Rotterdam in 1980, a unique achievement for the time. In 1981, a concert followed in a sold out venue. He then took the step to Ahoy in 1984 where he produced a sold out show twice.

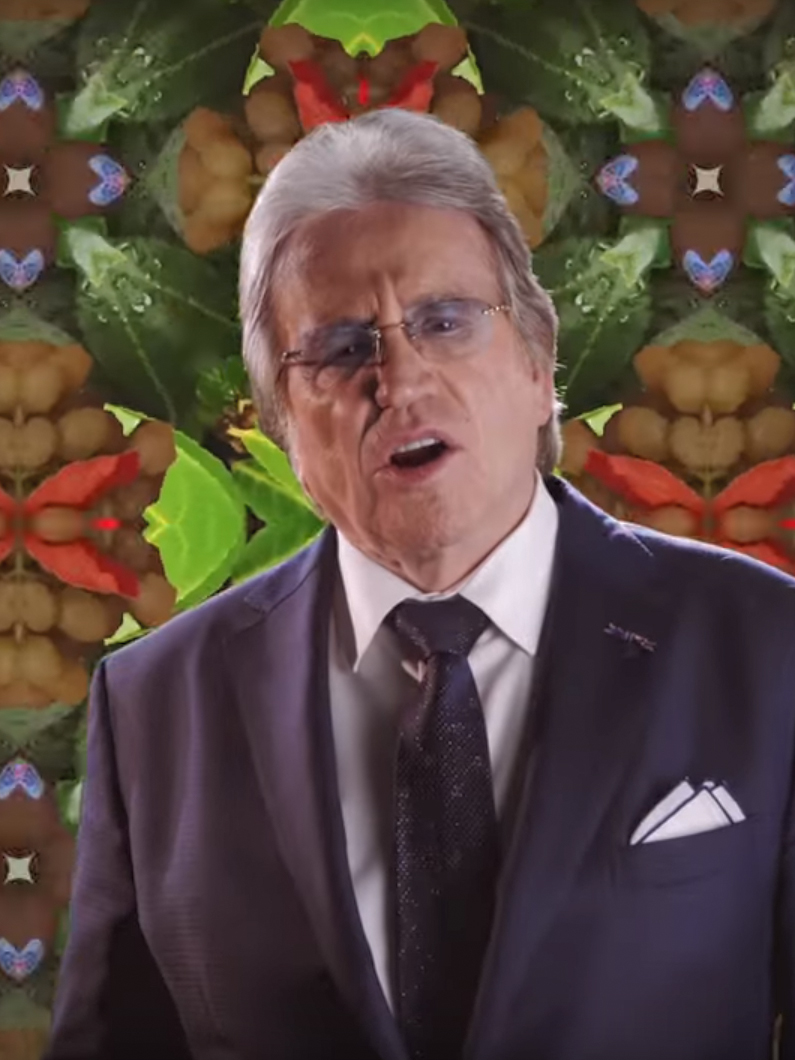
Lee Towers, 2017

In later years, many concerts and shows followed in Ahoy, where he also sang duets with Anita Meyer and others.

In 2003, Towers starred in the Dutch youth film Sinterklaas and the Danger in the Valley, directed by Martijn van Nellestijn.

Towers is a supporter of Feyenoord. His songs “Mijn Feyenoord” and “You Never Walk Alone” are regularly played at De Kuip and have become associated with the club. When Feyenoord wins a major trophy, Towers performs “You Never Walk Alone” during the celebrations on the Coolsingel.

His best-known hits are "You'll Never Walk Alone" (which is also a favourite on the terraces of Feyenoord's De Kuip), "Olympic Games" (which he recorded for the Let the Games Begin LP which was to coincide with the 1992 Summer Olympics) and "I Can See Clearly Now".

On 1 November 2011, Towers returned to Ahoy for "One Night Only", a special concert commemorating his 35 years in the entertainment business, as well as his 51st Vegas-style concert in the venue, in front of 12,000 fans. Towers had performed in many places around the world over his 40 years.

On January 27, 2013, the documentary Lee Towers: The Voice of Rotterdam premiered during the Rotterdam Film Festival. Filmmaker Hans Heijnen followed Towers for the project with the camera for a year.

Lee Towers with Glennis Grace, are the only ones who have performed at three different Toppers in Concert editions (2007, 2014 and 2016). At the end of 2016, De Toppers released the Christmas single, "A Very Happy Christmas". Towers played an extra role in the accompanying video clip.

In 2018, he participated in the television program Best Singers. He performed a cover of "What About Us" by Pink and recorded it as a single soon after.

== Awards ==
The city of Rotterdam awarded him the Erasmus pin in 1990 and the Wolfert van Borselen medal in 2000.

In 2006, he was awarded a Society Award along with Bridget Maasland. He was awarded the title "Ambassador of Rotterdam Port" as well as becoming "Ambassador for Feyenoord Football Club 2005". He has received many other awards for his charity work and music achievements.

In 2017, he received the Edison Oeuvre Prize for his enormous oeuvre and extraordinary achievements in Dutch music.

On November 13, 2019, Towers opened the residential towers in Rotterdam named after him.

Lee holds the record for number of concerts in Ahoy Rotterdam - 51 in total.

== Discography ==
=== Albums ===
Album title	Release date	Charting in the Dutch Album Top 100			Comments
Album title	Release date	Date of entry	Highest	Weeks	Comments
It's Raining in My Heart	1976	12-06-1976	3	18	Certified Gold and Platinum By NVPI
A Christmas Song for You	1976	01-01-1977	37	3	Certified Gold By NVPI
Special Request	1977	21-05-1977	16	10	Certified Gold By NVPI
Still Loves You	1978	08-07-1978	27	9	
Definitelee	1979	26-05-1979	27	12	
Simply the Best	1980	15-11-1980	11	15	Verzamelalbum Certified Gold By NVPI
Absolutelee	1981	24-10-1981	11	17	Certified Gold By NVPI
New York	1982	11-09-1982	6	23	Certified Gold By NVPI
In Concert	1983	14-05-1983	16	17	Livealbum Certified Gold By NVPI
I Believe in Music	1983	17-09-1983	14	14	
Gala of the Year	1984	01-12-1984	8	15	Livealbum Certified Gold By NVPI
You and Me	1985	14-09-1985	21	10	
The Merry Christmas	1985	21-12-1985	31	4	Certified Gold By NVPI
Run to Me	1986	15-03-1986	5	22	Certified Gold and Platinum By NVPI
Say Hello	1986	06-12-1986	42	9	
Live at Ahoy	1987	06-06-1987	35	7	Livealbum
The Story of Lee Towers	1987	24-10-1987	58	5	Verzamelalbum
In Harmony	1988	15-10-1988	35	17	
Listen to My Heart	1990	28-04-1990	30	7	
The Hollywood Album	1991	09-11-1991	61	4	
Never Walk Alone	1991				Gold and Platinum sales awards. Only sold at Kruidvat drug stores
Let The Games Begin	1992				Gold Only sold at Hema department stores for 1992 Olympic Games
Lee Towers Sings Elvis	1994				Gold sales award. Sold exclusively at Kruidvat drug stores.
Jubilee	1995	11-11-1995	76	9	
Country Roads	1999	25-09-1999	5	25	Certified Gold By NVPI
Het mooiste & het beste	2000	19-02-2000	97	1	Verzamelalbum
Members Only	2000	28-10-2000	31	10	
The Jubilee Collection	2011	05-11-2011	21	1	Verzamelalbum
Top 100	16-12-2011	24-12-2011	92	1	met Anita Meyer / Verzamelalbum
Memories	2012	-	-	-	
Sweet Memories	2013	20-04-2013	8	2	
A Christmas Song For You	2018	28-12-2018	49	1	
My Tribute To The Legend	2019	20-04-2019	17	2	

=== Live albums ===
- Lee Towers in Concert (1983)
- Gala of the Year (1984)
- Live at Ahoy (1987)
- Gala of the Year - Live with Guests (1990)

=== Singles ===
Single title	Release date	Charting in the Dutch Top 40			Comments
Single title	Release date	Date of entry	Highest	Weeks	Comments
It's raining in my heart	1976	10-01-1976	24	7	No. 14 in the Single Top 100
You never walk alone	1976	26-06-1976	5	7	No. 1 in the Single Top 100 / Alarmschijf
Everyday	1976	09-10-1976	top 20	-	
Frankie	1978	24-06-1978	18	5	No. 23 in the Single Top 100
Song of joy	1979	-			No. 41 in the Single Top 100
Bless you	1979	26-05-1979	30	5	No. 22 in the Single Top 100
Happy birthday baby	<24-12-1979	17-05-1980	30	5	No. 38 in the Single Top 100
Love potion number nine	1981	31-10-1981	23	6	No. 30 in the Single Top 100
I can see clearly now	1982	09-10-1982	10	7	No. 19 in the Single Top 100
Love is all	1982	11-12-1982	top 7	-	No. 43 in the Single Top 100
I believe in music	1983	24-09-1983	tip6	-	No. 40 in the Single Top 100
If you know what I mean	1984	07-01-1984	tip14	-	
Let's get the world singing again	1984	06-10-1984	tip17	-	
Run to me	1986	11-01-1986	9	8	met Anita Meyer / No. 3 in the Single Top 100
We've got tonight	1986	19-04-1986	31	3	met Anita Meyer / No. 35 in the Single Top 100
Golden lady	1986	22-11-1986	tip17	-	
Highway to freedom	1988	17-09-1988	tip13	-	No. 79 in the Single Top 100
Lady	1990	21-04-1990	tip11	-	No. 58 in the Single Top 100
Ik wou dat ik voor één keertje in m'n leven	1992	07-03-1992	22	6	met Bart de Graaff / No. 22 in the Single Top 100
The drinking song	1995	02-12-1995	tip13	-	
I can see clearly now - Walking on sunshine	1997	28-06-1997	28	3	met Exposure / No. 44 in the Single Top 100
Mijn Feyenoord	1998	26-12-1998	top 2	-	No. 40 in the Single Top 100
Feyenoord voor altijd	2008	-			No. 22 in the Single Top 100
Wereldwijd orkest	2011	03-12-2011	12	4	Als onderdeel van Diverse artiesten / met Het Metropole Orkest & Vince Mendoza / No. 1 in the Single Top 100
Ga door	2012	-			met Johnny Gold / No. 67 in the Single Top 100
Koningslied	19-04-2013	27-04-2013	2	4	als onderdeel van Nationaal Comité Inhuldiging / No. 1 in the Single Top 100
Kerstmis vier je samen	2014	13-12-2014	tip25	-	als onderdeel van Eenmaal Voor Allen / No. 68 in the Single Top 100

=== DVDs ===
Dvd's met hitnoteringen in de Nederlandse Music Top 30	Datum van verschijnen	Datum van binnenkomst	Hoogste positie	Aantal weken	Opmerkingen
Live in Concert	2011	13-08-2011	7	7	
One Night Only - Live in Ahoy	2011	24-12-2011	8	10	
