= God's Children (The Kinks song) =

- French picture sleeve

Single by The Kinks

from the album Percy
- B-side: "Moments" (UK) "The Way Love Used To Be" (US)
- Released: 1971
- Recorded: 1970
- Genre: Rock
- Length: 3:16
- Label: Pye (UK); Reprise (US)
- Songwriter: Ray Davies
- Producer: Ray Davies

The Kinks singles chronology
| "Apeman" (1970) | "God's Children" (1971) | "20th Century Man" (1971) |

"God's Children" is a song written by Ray Davies and performed by the Kinks. Written as part of the soundtrack for the film Percy, it features lyrics protesting the use of science to interfere with the natural human form. It was released as a single in 1971 and later appeared on the band's soundtrack album Percy. Critics have praised the song and it has since appeared on several Kinks compilations.

== Background ==
The theme of "God's Children" is the limits of technology, inspired by the penis transplant subject matter of the Percy film. The song uses acoustic instrumentation, accompanied by an orchestral arrangement by Stanley Myers.

Dave Davies praised the song as "phenomenal, an amazing song which is timeless and if you play it now it could sit quite comfortably in any decade." He similarly commented in 2023, "I've always loved it, the lyric, and the melody, the whole concept". Kinks organist John Gosling regards "God's Children" as one of his three favorite Kinks' songs.

== Release ==
In addition to appearing on the Percy album and in the film of the same name, "God's Children" has been included on some Kinks compilation albums such as The Kink Kronikles. Most recently, it has appeared on the compilation The Journey, Part 2, an inclusion Dave Davies noted he was happy to see.

A 25-second instrumental from the song entitled "God's Children - End" is used as the concluding track of Percy.

== Critical reception ==
Music critic Johnny Rogan described the melody of "God's Children" as "spellbinding". Ray Davies sings the lead vocal. Rogan has stated that Davies' "plea for a return to Edenic innocence was powerful and moving and arguably the closest he has come to writing a religious song." Billboard Magazine described the song as "a potent lyric ballad set to a rock beat" and regarded it as a "strong entry for Top 40, FM and Hot 100." However, the single's success was hampered by lack of promotion by the label, and lack of live concert support from the band.
