= List of Dutch Top 40 number-one singles of 1981 =

These hits topped the Dutch Top 40 in 1981 (see 1981 in music).

Issue Date	Song	Artist(s)	Reference
3 January	"Santa Maria"	Roland Kaiser	
10 January	"Lola (live)"	The Kinks	
17 January	"Lola (live)"	The Kinks	
24 January	"Lola (live)"	The Kinks	
31 January	"Lola (live)"	The Kinks	
7 February	"Shine up"	Doris D & The Pins	
14 February	"Shine up"	Doris D & The Pins	
21 February	"Stars on 45 Medley"	Stars on 45	
28 February	"Stars on 45 Medley"	Stars on 45	
7 March	"Stars on 45 Medley"	Stars on 45	
14 March	"Stars on 45 Medley"	Stars on 45	
21 March	"In the Air Tonight"	Phil Collins	
28 March	"In the Air Tonight"	Phil Collins	
4 April	"In the Air Tonight"	Phil Collins	
11 April	"Vienna"	Ultravox	
18 April	"Vienna"	Ultravox	
25 April	"Vienna"	Ultravox	
2 May	"Angel of Mine"	Frank Duval	
9 May	"Angel of Mine"	Frank Duval	
16 May	"Making Your Mind Up"	Bucks Fizz	
23 May	"Making Your Mind Up"	Bucks Fizz	
30 May	"How 'Bout Us"	Champaign	
6 June	"How 'Bout Us"	Champaign	
13 June	"How 'Bout Us"	Champaign	
20 June	"How 'Bout Us"	Champaign	
27 June	"How 'Bout Us"	Champaign	
4 July	"How 'Bout Us"	Champaign	
11 July	"How 'Bout Us"	Champaign	
18 July	"How 'Bout Us"	Champaign	
25 July	"One Day in Your Life"	Michael Jackson	
1 August	"One Day in Your Life"	Michael Jackson	
8 August	"One Day in Your Life"	Michael Jackson	
15 August	"One Day in Your Life"	Michael Jackson	
22 August	"De Nederlandse sterre die strale overal"	Rubberen Robbie	
29 August	"De Nederlandse sterre die strale overal"	Rubberen Robbie	
5 September	"De Nederlandse sterre die strale overal"	Rubberen Robbie	
12 September	"For Your Eyes Only"	Sheena Easton	
19 September	"For Your Eyes Only"	Sheena Easton	
26 September	"Why Tell Me Why"	Anita Meyer	
3 October	"Why Tell Me Why"	Anita Meyer	
10 October	"Why Tell Me Why"	Anita Meyer	
17 October	"Why Tell Me Why"	Anita Meyer	
24 October	"Why Tell Me Why"	Anita Meyer	
31 October	"Why Tell Me Why"	Anita Meyer	
7 November	"Every Little Thing She Does Is Magic"	The Police	
14 November	"Every Little Thing She Does Is Magic"	The Police	
21 November	"Every Little Thing She Does Is Magic"	The Police	
28 November	"Pretend"	Alvin Stardust	
5 December	"Pretend"	Alvin Stardust	
12 December	"Under Pressure"	Queen & David Bowie	
19 December	"Why Do Fools Fall in Love"	Diana Ross	
26 December	"Why Do Fools Fall in Love"	Diana Ross	

== See also ==
- 1981 in music
