= The Kinks in Mono =

Box set by The Kinks
- Released: 21 November 2011
- Recorded: 1964–1969
- Genre: Rock
- Label: Sanctuary

The Kinks chronology
Picture Book (2008)	The Kinks in Mono (2011)	Waterloo Sunset: The Very Best of The Kinks & Ray Davies (2012)

The Kinks in Mono is a box set by English rock band the Kinks. It was released on 21 November 2011.

The box set consists of the band's UK albums and EPs released between 1964 and 1969 in monophonic sound.

This compilation is not to be confused with a 2016 Kinks boxed set titled The Mono Collection.

== Reception ==
Professional ratings
Review scores
Source	Rating
AllMusic	4/5 stars
Pitchfork	8.5/10
Uncut	3/5 stars

In a review for AllMusic, Stephen Thomas Erlewine wrote that it "may not seem revelatory, partially because so much of it was released earlier in 2011 as part of Universal’s campaign of double-disc deluxe reissues of the band’s catalog." and that it "is a mightily attractive way to get all the mono mixes at once, considering that each of the seven albums, along with the bonus EP and Mono Kollectables discs, are packaged as mini-LPs and the set has a clever mini-hardcover book designed in the fashion of a ‘60s fan mag with new notes by Kinks expert Peter Doggett".

In an Uncut magazine review, Michael Bonner called it a "lovely package, and at £75 a pop, so it should be, but it adds nothing to the back catalogue of the Muswell Hill wonders." and its "narrative arc of one of British pop’s greatest bands emerges fractured."

In a Clash magazine review, the admin wrote how it "encompasses nearly all aspects of the musical box set spectrum." noting that "unless you were there at the time, chances are that you've not been listening to The Kinks in full 60s (the LPs cover 1964-1969) raunchy, swinging rigour."

In a Pitchfork review, Tangari Joe stated its a "well-designed package clearly created with a lot of love" and it is "all here, well-housed. The only question is whether that's enough.".

== Albums and EPs ==
The following albums and EPs are included in the set:

- Kinks
- Kinda Kinks
- The Kink Kontroversy
- Face to Face
- Something Else by the Kinks
- The Kinks Are the Village Green Preservation Society
- Arthur (Or the Decline and Fall of the British Empire)
- Kinksize Session
- Kinksize Hits
- Kwyet Kinks
- Dedicated Kinks
- The Kinks Mono Kollectables Vol. 1 (box set exclusive)
- The Kinks Mono Kollectables Vol. 2 (box set exclusive)

== Charts ==
Chart performance for The Kinks in Mono
Chart (2012)	Peak position
Dutch Albums (Alternative Top 30)	12
