= Why Tell Me, Why =

Single by Anita Meyer

from the album Shades of Desire
- B-side: "The Wind Will Come In Time"
- Released: August 1981
- Label: Ariola
- Songwriters: Piet Souer, Gregory Elias, Martin Duiser
- Producer: Martin Duiser

"Why Tell Me, Why" is a 1981 song performed by Dutch singer Anita Meyer and it is one of her most notable songs. The song was composed by Piet Souer, Gregory Elias and Martin Duiser, and produced by Martin Duiser. It charted for 14 weeks.

== Cover versions ==
- The song was covered in 1982 by French singer Julie Pietri as "Je veux croire" and became a hit in France.
- The song was also covered by Swedish singer Carola as "Säg mig var du står" for her debut album Främling (1983). This version has become a popular party song among millennials in Sweden in the early 2020s, and charted at number 73 on the Swedish singles chart in 2026.
- In 2019, Little Jinder covered the song on the Swedish reality TV series Så mycket bättre. It peaked at number 61 in Sweden.
- In 2020, Carola released a new version of "Säg mig var du står" as a featuring Swedish singer Zara Larsson. While the original version never charted, the duet reached number 1 on the Svensktoppen. It also peaked at number two on the Sverigetopplistan and has been certified double platinum in Sweden. It was first performed live at Gröna Lund in Stockholm during the summer of 2020. The re-recording was later included on the Swedish Summer edition of Poster Girl.

Further versions can be found at Hitparade.ch.

== Other versions and remixes ==
The single has been remixed twice, first in 2009 by Offer Nissim and in 2011 by Dutch DJ Gailliano (with Meyer getting credit in the latter). The song is also sampled heavily in F.R.A.N.K.'s single "Discotex (Yah!)", which reached number one on Belgium's Ultratop 50 chart in January 2011.

== Charts ==
=== Weekly charts ===
Chart (1981)	Peak position
Belgium (Ultratop 50 Flanders)	1
Netherlands (Dutch Top 40)	1
Netherlands (Single Top 100)	1
New Zealand (Recorded Music NZ)	49

=== Year-end charts ===
Chart (1981)	Position
Belgium (Ultratop Flanders)	4
Netherlands (Dutch Top 40)	2
Netherlands (Single Top 100)	1

== See also ==
- List of Dutch Top 40 number-one singles of 1981
- List of number-one hits of 1981 (Flanders)
