= Monaural sound =

Sound intended to be heard as if it were emanating from one position

A diagram of monaural sound

Monaural sound or monophonic sound (often shortened to mono) is sound intended to be heard as if it were emanating from one position. This contrasts with stereophonic sound or stereo, which uses two separate audio channels to reproduce sound from two microphones on the right and left side, which is reproduced with two separate loudspeakers to give a sense of the direction of sound sources. In mono, only one loudspeaker is necessary, but, when played through multiple loudspeakers or headphones, identical audio signals are fed to each speaker, resulting in the perception of one-channel sound "imaging" in one sonic space between the speakers (provided that the speakers are set up in a proper symmetrical critical-listening placement). Monaural recordings, like stereo ones, typically use multiple microphones fed into multiple channels on a recording console, but each channel is "panned" to the center. In the final stage, the various center-panned signal paths are usually mixed down to two identical tracks, which, because they are identical, are perceived upon playback as representing a single unified signal at a single place in the soundstage. In some cases, multitrack sources are mixed to a one-track tape, thus becoming one signal. In the mastering stage, particularly in the days of mono records, the one- or two-track mono master tape was then transferred to a one-track lathe used to produce a master disc intended to be used in the pressing of a monophonic record. Today, however, monaural recordings are usually mastered to be played on stereo and multi-track formats, yet retain their center-panned mono soundstage characteristics.

Monaural sound has largely been replaced by stereo sound in most entertainment applications, but remains the standard for radiotelephone communications, telephone networks, and audio induction loops for use with hearing aids. FM radio stations broadcast in stereo, while most AM radio stations broadcast in mono. (Although an AM stereo broadcast standard exists, few AM stations are equipped to use it.) A few FM stations—notably talk-radio stations—choose to broadcast in monaural because of the slight advantage in signal strength and bandwidth the standard affords over a stereophonic signal of the same power.

== History ==
While some experiments were made with stereophonic recording and reproduction from the early days of the phonograph in the late-19th century, monaural was the rule for almost all audio recording until the second half of the 20th century.

Monaural sound is normal on:

- Phonograph cylinders
- Gramophone records made before 1958, such as those made for playing at 78 rpm and earlier 16 2/3, 33 1/3 and 45 rpm microgroove records
- AM broadcasting
- Some FM radio stations that broadcast only spoken-word or talk-radio content (in order to maximize their coverage area)
- Subcarrier signals for FM radio, which carry leased content such as background music for businesses or a radio reading service
- Background music services such as Seeburg 1000; satellite broadcasts by Muzak, and some public address systems

Incompatible standards exist for:

- Later vinyl records (although monophonic records—which had almost disappeared in the United States by the end of 1967—could be played with a stereo cartridge)
- Reel-to-reel audio tape recording (depending on track alignment)

Compatible monaural and stereophonic standards exist for:

- MiniDisc
- Compact audio cassette
- FM (and, in rare circumstances, AM) radio broadcasting
- VCR formats
- TV
- Digital audio files on many computers in many formats (WAV, MP3, etc.)

No native monaural standards exist for:

- 8-track tape
- Compact disc

In those formats, the mono-source material is presented as two identical channels, thus being technically stereo.

At various times, artists have preferred to work in mono, either in recognition of the technical limitations of the equipment of the era or because of simple preference (this can be seen as analogous to filmmakers working in black and white). An example is John Mellencamp's 2010 album No Better Than This, recorded in mono to emulate mid-20th century blues and folk records. Some early recordings such as The Beatles' first four albums (Please Please Me, With the Beatles, A Hard Day's Night, Beatles for Sale) were re-released in the CD era as monophonic in recognition of the fact that the source tapes for the earliest recordings were two-track, with vocals on one track and instruments on the other (even though this was only true on the first two albums, while the latter two had been recorded on four-track). This was actually intended to provide flexibility in producing a final mono mix, not to provide a stereo recording, although because of demand this was done anyway, and the early material was available on vinyl in both mono and stereo formats. In the 1960s and 1970s, it was common in the pop world for stereophonic versions of mono tracks to be generated electronically using filtering techniques to attempt to pick out various instruments and vocals; but these were often considered unsatisfactory, owing to the artifacts of the conversion process.

Directors Stanley Kubrick and Woody Allen, among others, preferred to record their films' sound tracks in mono.

Monaural LP records were eventually phased out and no longer manufactured after the early 1970s, with a few exceptions. For example, Decca UK had a few double issues until the end of 1970 – the last one being Tom Jones's "I Who Have Nothing"; in Brazil records were released in both mono and stereo as late as 1972. During the 1960s it was common for albums to be released as both mono and stereo LPs, occasionally with slight differences between the two (again, detailed information of The Beatles' recordings provides a good example of the differences). This was because many people owned mono record players that were incapable of playing stereo records, as well as the prevalence of AM radio. Because of the limited quantities pressed and alternative mixes of several tracks, the monaural versions of these albums are often valued more highly than their stereo LP counterparts in record-collecting circles today.

On 9 September 2009, The Beatles re-released a remastered box set of their mono output spanning the Please Please Me album to The Beatles (commonly called "The White Album"). The set, simply called The Beatles in Mono, also includes a two-disc summary of the mono singles, B-sides and EP tracks released throughout their career. Also included were five tracks originally mixed for an unissued mono Yellow Submarine EP. Bob Dylan followed suit on 19 October 2010 with The Original Mono Recordings, a box set featuring the mono releases from Bob Dylan (1962) to John Wesley Harding (1967). On 21 November 2011, The Kinks' mono recordings were issued as The Kinks in Mono box set, featuring the releases of the band's albums from Kinks (1964) to Arthur (1969), with three additional CDs of non-album tracks that appeared as singles or EP tracks. When the initial run of the box set sold out, no more were pressed, unlike the Beatles and Dylan sets.

== Compatibility between mono and stereo sound ==
=== Merged stereo ===
Sometimes mono sound or monaural can simply refer to a merged pair of stereo channels - also known as "collapsed stereo" or "folded-down stereo". Over time, some devices have used mono sound amplification circuitry with two or more speakers since it can cut the cost of the hardware. Some consumer electronics with stereo RCA outputs will merge both channels into the one white RCA output (i.e., the white one) when nothing is connected to the right one, as determined by a microswitch in the red RCA output. Common devices with this are VCRs, DVD/Blu-ray players, information appliances, set-top boxes, and the like. Video game consoles sometimes have male RCA ends of cables with a proprietary multi-A/V plug on the other end, which prevents automatic stereo merging unless adapters are used. Another example of merged stereo is a mono Compact Cassette playing back a stereo recording, whereby its mono reading head inherently sums the stereo channels.

Disadvantages of merged stereo involve phase cancellations that may have the effect of muffling the final sound output. If channels are merged after being sent through a power amplifier but before being connected to a loudspeaker, it places more stress on the loudspeaker. It has usually been the practice in recording studios to make separate mixes for mono recordings (rather than folded-down stereo-to-mono), so that the final mono master will avoid the pitfalls of collapsed stereo. In video games, merging stereo to mono sound prevents players from discerning what direction distant SFX are coming from, and reverse stereo has a similar setback too. Having an array of loudspeakers connected to their own amplifier outputs can mitigate issues with the electrical load for a single loudspeaker coil and allow the listener to perceive an "image" of sound in the free space between the speakers.

=== Mirrored mono ===
Mirrored mono sound is the opposite of merged stereo. An example is Audio CDs, which are natively always stereo so they are mastered with two identical channels when the source material is mono. The term also applies where media with mono sound support, such as MP3, is played back on stereo devices that automatically mirror it to two output channels. It can also mean a mono system with a headphone output compatible with stereo headphones, or when a Compact Cassette recorded with mono sound is played back with a stereo tape head.

Other instances of "mirrored mono" also include using the right stereo channel in lieu of a "left" one (or vice versa) where both channels are wired to mirror only one.

=== Both ===
Instances of both "merged stereo" and "mirrored mono" can occur when the stereo channels are merged to a mono system with stereo headphone compatibility or when a mono system has "twin speakers" (or "pseudo-stereo").

Other applications that involve mirrored mono with merged stereo occur when mono is available as an internal feature of a device that can toggle between stereo and mono. For instance, many FM radios are capable of toggling between mono and stereo in a way where a stereo signal is merged into mono and then mirrored between stereo speakers. Some computer software and video games allow stereo or mono for the soundtrack, merging stereo internally to spare one from using a Y adapter with left and right RCA plugs when using mono equipment, such as guitar amplifiers.

=== Native stereo equipment with mono-only features ===
Some TV/VCR combo decks on the market had stereo TV functionality with "twin speakers", whereas the VCR feature was only mono, which is typical of "consumer-grade VCRs" from decades ago. Some of these devices even had front RCA inputs for composite video (yellow), and mono audio (white) in which many of these devices didn't even have a right-channel RCA plug (red) even if it was just for "merging" stereo into mono for mono soundtracks to be recorded onto videotapes. This is odd since one would think that a "right channel" would be included for A/V in on a TV which had MTS stereo TV sound on its tuner.

Some stereo receivers will also include mono microphone inputs.
