= Anita Meyer =

Dutch singer (born 1954)

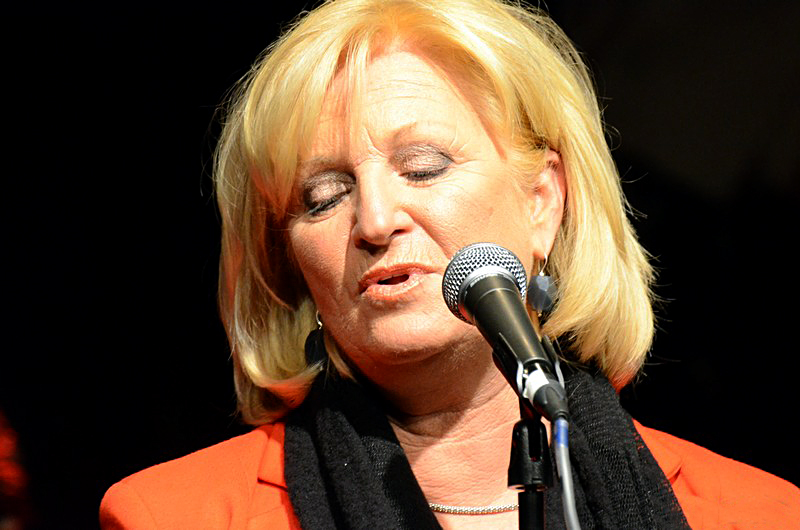
- Anita Meyer performing live in December 2011

Background information
- Born: Annita Meijer; October 29, 1954 (age 71); Rotterdam
- Genres: Pop music, disco
- Occupation: Singer
- Years active: 1976–present
- Labels: T2 Entertainment
- Website: www.anitameyer.nl

Anita Meyer (Annita Meijer), born in Rotterdam 29 October 1954, is a Dutch singer. One of her most notable songs is "Why Tell Me Why" that charted for 14 weeks and topped the Dutch singles list for six weeks in 1981.

== Discography ==
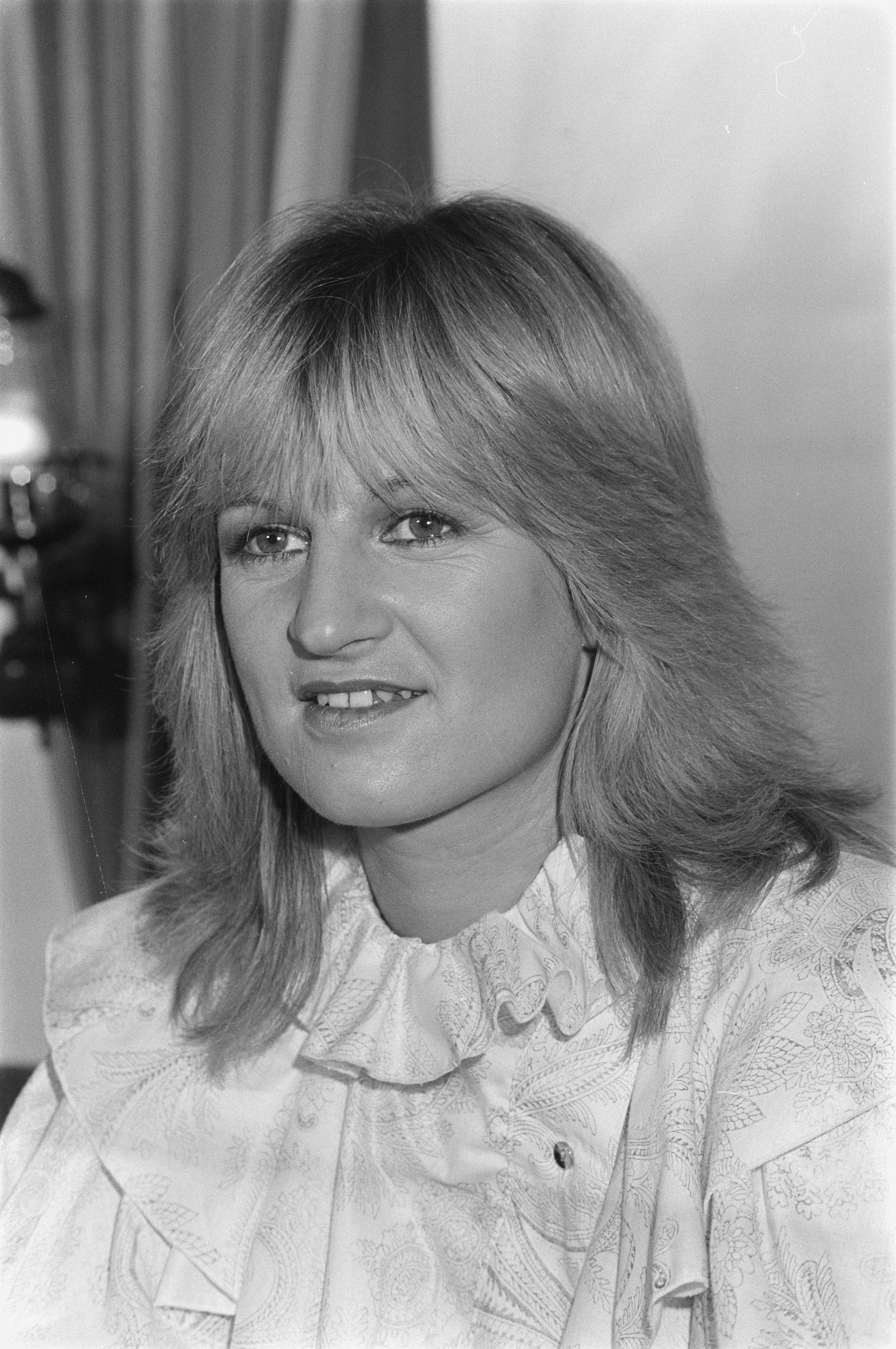
Anita Meyer in 1981

=== Albums ===
- In The Meantime I Will Sing (1976) #20 NED
- Love You Too Much (1979)
- Shades of Desire (1981) #1 NED
- Past, Present and Future (1982) #5 NED
- Moments Together (1983) #10 NED
- Face to Face (1984) #10 NED
- Greatest Hits (1985) #10 NED
- Now and Forever (1986) #23 NED
- Run to Me (with Lee Towers) (1986) #5 NED
- Première (1987) #13 NED
- The Ahoy Concert (Live album) (1988) #15 NED
- Close to You (1989) #21 NED
- Autumn Leaves (1990) #37 NED
- The Commandments (1990)
- Memories of Love (1991)
- RTL 4: De Hits van Anita Meyer (1991)
- The Alternative Way (1991)
- The Very Best of Anita Meyer (1991)
- Music Music (1992) #53 NED
- Best Of (1993)
- The Love of a Woman (1994)
- A Song Can Change Your Life (1996)
- Dichter bij Elkaar (1998) #95 NED
- Just Once (1999)
- Spanish Guitar (2001)
- Tears Go By (2009) with Metropole Orkest #54 NED

=== Singles ===
- "Just a Disillusion" (1976) #18 NED
- "The Alternative Way"(with Rainbow Train) (1976) #1 NED
- "You Can Do It" (1976) #9 NED
- "Anita That's My Name" (1977) #21 NED
- "It Hurts" (1977)
- "You Are My Everything" (with Hans Vermeulen from Sandy Coast) (1979)
- "Rock Me Up A Mountain" (1980) #28 NED
- "The Hurtin' Doesn't Go Away" (1981)
- "Why Tell Me Why" (1981) #1 NED (Best-selling single in the Netherlands in 1981)
- "They Don't Play Our Lovesong Anymore" (1981) #3 NED
- "Blame It On Love" (1982)
- "Idaho" (1982) #4 NED
- "The One That You Love" (1982) #16 NED
- "Goodbye To Love" (1983) #23 NED
- "Sandy's Song" (1983) #23 NED
- "Blame It On Love" (1984) #33 NED
- "Heart Of Stone" (1984) #26 NED
- "This Ain't A Life To Be Lived" (1984)
- "Sometimes When We Touch" (1985)
- "The Story Of A New Born Love" (1985)
- "Run To Me" (with Lee Towers, live) (1986) #9 NED
- "We've Got Tonight" (with Lee Towers) (1986) #31 NED
- "You Are My Life" (1986)
- "Now and Forever" (1987)
- "The Exodus Song" (1987)
- "Having My Baby" (with Paul Anka) (1988)
- "That's What Friends Are For" (1989)
- "Freedom" (1990) #21 NED
- "Music Music (This Is Why)" (1992) #34 NED
- "The Medicine Of Love" (1992)
- "Het Spijt Me" (Title song for TV-program) (1993) #24 NED
- "I Couldn't Say Goodbye" (1993)
- "I've Heard It All Before" (1994)
- "The Love of A Woman" (1994)
- "De Warmte Van Je Hart" (1996)
- "I Don't Wanna Cry Again" (1996)
- "We Are The Wave" (1996)
- "Nooit Meer Naar Parijs" (1998)
- "Wacht Op Mij" (1998)
- "Mas Alla" (2001)
- "Salomé" (2001)
- "Het lieftallige buurmeisje van de oosterweg" (2021)
