= Oklahoma U.S.A. =

Song by The Kinks

from the album Muswell Hillbillies
- Released: 24 Nov, 1971 (US LP), 26 Nov, 1971 (UK LP)
- Recorded: Aug–Sep 1971 at Morgan Studios, Willesden, London
- Length: 2:38
- Label: RCA Victor
- Songwriter: Ray Davies
- Producer: Ray Davies

Oklahoma U.S.A. is a song written by Ray Davies and performed by British rock band the Kinks on their 1971 LP Muswell Hillbillies.

== Synopsis ==
The lyrics describe a young woman who leads a monotonous working class life, and imagines in her dreams she is in various Hollywood films, such as Oklahoma! ("But in her dreams she is far away / In Oklahoma U.S.A. / With Shirley Jones and Gordon MacRae"). As the song progresses and she goes on with life she continues to dream of Oklahoma and Hollywood ("She walks to work but she's still in a daze / She's Rita Hayworth or Doris Day / And Errol Flynn's gonna take her away / To Oklahoma U.S.A."). The song opens and closes with the lyrics "All life we work, but work is a bore / If life's for livin', then what's livin' for?"

== Instrumentation ==
The piece differs from the other songs on Muswell Hillbillies in the fact that it features a much quieter sound and overall feel. Mick Avory's drums are absent, and the only instruments used are an acoustic guitar, accordion, and keyboards (piano/organ).

== Cover versions ==
Indie rock group Yo La Tengo covered it on their 1990 album Fakebook. Country artist Lauren Adams covered it on her album Secret Heart, and Leigh Harris recorded a version on the album House of Secrets.
