= Supersonic Rocket Ship =

Single by The Kinks

from the album Everybody's in Show-Biz
- B-side: "You Don't Know My Name" (Dave Davies)
- Released: 5 May 1972
- Recorded: March 1972
- Studio: Morgan Studios, Willesden, London
- Genre: Rock; calypso
- Length: 3:32
- Label: RCA
- Songwriter: Ray Davies
- Producer: Ray Davies

The Kinks singles chronology
"20th Century Man" (1971)	"Supersonic Rocket Ship" (1972)	"Celluloid Heroes" (1972)

Music video
- "Supersonic Rocket Ship" on YouTube

"Supersonic Rocket Ship" is a single recorded by British rock band the Kinks, written by Ray Davies. It was released on 5 May 1972, in the UK, and in September of that year for its US release. "Supersonic Rocket Ship" was also included as a track on the double LP Everybody's in Show-Biz, which was released on 25 August 1972, in the US and on 1 September in the UK.

== Synopsis ==
In the song, the singer talks about his "supersonic rocket ship", which contains a kind of paradise or refuge from all the troubles in the world, where "nobody has to be hip", "nobody's gonna travel second class", and "there'll be equality, and no suppression of minorities". It fits in the groove of other Ray Davies songs like "Apeman", that express a desire to go back to a simpler life or escape from all life's woes to a better world (a desert island, the rocket ship, etc.)

Dave Davies commented on the song, "I have a special love for that track because it's got a great optimism about it. It's also got a lot of sarcasm. It's a lovely blend of [both], plus reality and dysfunction – but also hope."

Music critic Johnny Rogan interprets the song as Ray Davies' "attack on rock star hipness", since his fantasy rocket ship will "serve as a refuge for misfits and other suppressed minorities".

== Instrumentation ==
The song has strong Caribbean undertones (another similarity to "Apeman"), perhaps influenced by the popularity of reggae music at the time. Rogan describes the song as having a "Calypso-style". This is emphasized with the use of a steel drum in the background. "Supersonic Rocket Ship" also features prominent use of Ray Davies' National Steel resonator guitar.

== Single release ==
It was released as a single in the UK in May 1972, and September in the US. It was a hit in the UK, climbing to No. 16 on Melody Maker, the same on Record Retailer, and No. 23 on New Musical Express. It was to be the band's last sizeable hit in the UK for 11 years, until "Come Dancing" got to No. 11 in the summer of 1983. In the US, however, it only made it to No. 111 on Billboard. The single reached the Top Ten in Boston.

Cash Box said of the single release "complete with steel drums for mood, and their solid lyrics, tune should take off immediately in all pop markets." Record World called it a "refreshing cutie that's a cinch to please".

== Promo video ==
A promotional film was made for the single, featuring John Gosling attempting to become airborne dressed in angel wings and flight goggles, intercut with stock footage.

== Legacy ==
The song was featured in the 2019 film Avengers: Endgame serving as a transition between the scene where the Hulk gives Ant-Man tacos and the scene where Rocket Raccoon and the Hulk travel to visit Thor in New Asgard.

== Personnel ==
- Ray Davies – acoustic guitar, lead vocals
- Dave Davies – lead guitar, backing vocals
- John Dalton – bass guitar
- Mick Avory – drums, percussion
- John Gosling – keyboards
- Mike Cotton – trumpet
- John Beecham – trombone, tuba
