= The Darjeeling Limited =

2007 film by Wes Anderson

- Theatrical release poster
- Directed by: Wes Anderson
- Written by: Wes Anderson; Roman Coppola; Jason Schwartzman
- Produced by: Wes Anderson; Scott Rudin; Roman Coppola; Lydia Dean Pilcher
- Starring: Owen Wilson; Adrien Brody; Jason Schwartzman
- Cinematography: Robert Yeoman
- Edited by: Andrew Weisblum
- Production companies: Dune Entertainment; Indian Paintbrush; Collage Cinemagraphique; American Empirical Pictures; Cine Mosaic; Scott Rudin Productions
- Distributed by: Fox Searchlight Pictures
- Release dates: September 3, 2007 (Venice); September 29, 2007 (United States)
- Running time: 91 minutes
- Country: United States
- Language: English
- Budget: $17.5 million
- Box office: $35.1 million

The Darjeeling Limited is a 2007 American comedy-drama film directed by Wes Anderson, which he co-produced with Scott Rudin, Roman Coppola, and Lydia Dean Pilcher, and co-wrote with Coppola and Jason Schwartzman. The film stars Owen Wilson, Adrien Brody, and Schwartzman. The cast also includes Waris Ahluwalia, Amara Karan, Wallace Wolodarsky, Barbet Schroeder, and Anjelica Huston, with Natalie Portman, Camilla Rutherford, Irrfan Khan, and Bill Murray in cameo roles.

The plot follows three estranged brothers who agree to meet in India a year after their father's funeral for a "spiritual journey" aboard a luxury train.

The film was released on September 29, 2007, by Fox Searchlight Pictures. The film received generally favorable reviews from critics and earned $35 million on a $17.5 million budget. The film premiered at the 64th Venice International Film Festival in competition for the Golden Lion and was named among the Top Films of the Year at the 2007 NYFCO Awards.

Anderson's Hotel Chevalier, starring Schwartzman and Portman, acts as a prologue to the film.

== Plot ==
In India, Peter Whitman boards a train, "The Darjeeling Limited", as it pulls out of a station. On the train, he reunites with his brothers, Francis and Jack; the three have not seen each other since their father's funeral a year earlier.

Francis, the eldest, whose head is covered in bandages after a near-fatal motorcycle accident, wishes to reconcile with his brothers on a journey of spiritual self-discovery. He is also secretly searching for their mother, Patricia, whom the brothers have not seen in many years. With the help of his assistant, Brendan, Francis has drawn up a strict itinerary for the trip, and he confiscates his brothers' passports to prevent them from getting off the train too early. The brothers continue to grieve over their father's death: they carry many pieces of luggage marked with his initials, along with other personal items that belonged to him.

The train takes them through the countryside and to various Hindu and Sikh temples, though tension builds as Peter and Jack become angered with Francis's controlling behavior. Francis eventually reveals that they will be going to see Patricia, who has become a nun and is living at a Christian convent in the Himalayas. Peter and Jack are furious; Francis knew they would not come if he told them this earlier.

Their differences finally come to a head, and the brothers have a physical altercation on the train, upsetting the other passengers. The chief steward, whom the brothers have repeatedly annoyed throughout the journey, has them ejected. Brendan quits his job and reboards the train after giving Francis a letter from Patricia; the letter implies that she does not want to see them. The brothers decide to leave India, go their separate ways, and never return.

After hiking through the wilderness with all their luggage, the brothers see three young boys fall into a river while attempting to pull a raft across it. Jack and Francis rescue two of the boys, but Peter fails to save the third, who dies. They carry the body back to the boys' village, where they spend the night. They attend the funeral the next day and experience a flashback to the day of their father's funeral.

Riding to the funeral in a limousine with Peter's wife, Alice, the brothers get out to pick up their father's Porsche from a repair shop. When the mechanic tells them it is missing a part and the battery is dead, Peter frantically tries to get it moving, but he eventually has to give up, and the three continue on to the funeral in the same limousine. It is revealed that their father died from being hit by a taxi, and that their mother will not be attending the funeral.

Back in the present, the brothers arrive at the airport, but they suddenly decide to rip up their tickets and go visit their mother. They reach the convent, where Patricia is surprised but happy to see them. Francis tells her that his accident was actually intentional.

That night, after the brothers confront Patricia for abandoning them, the family gather together in silence and reconnect in love. The brothers awake the next morning to find their mother gone, having left them their breakfast. They decide to leave.

At a station, the brothers run to catch another train, the "Bengal Lancer", and discard all their father's suitcases and bags along the way. On board, Francis offers to return Peter’s and Jack’s passports to them, but they tell him to hold onto them.

== Cast ==
- Owen Wilson as Francis
- Adrien Brody as Peter
- Jason Schwartzman as Jack
- Amara Karan as Rita
- Wally Wolodarsky as Brendan
- Waris Ahluwalia as The Chief Steward
- Irrfan Khan as The Father
- Barbet Schroeder as The Mechanic
- Camilla Rutherford as Alice
- Bill Murray as The Businessman
- Anjelica Huston as Patricia
- Natalie Portman as Rhett
- Kumar Pallana as The Old Man
- Gurdeep Singh as The Chief Steward on the Bengal Lancer

== Locations ==
Much of the film was shot in Jodhpur, Rajasthan. Scenes representing the Himalayas were filmed in Udaipur, including the opening sequence, which was shot on the streets of Jodhpur. The airport terminal seen near the end of the film is the old terminal building of Udaipur Airport. The hill featured in the final scenes is Elephant Hill, located in Narlai. The scenes set in New York were filmed in Long Island City.

== Music and soundtrack ==
The soundtrack features three songs by The Kinks, "Powerman", "Strangers", and "This Time Tomorrow", all from the 1970 album, Lola Versus Powerman and the Moneygoround, Part One, as well as "Play With Fire" by The Rolling Stones. "Where Do You Go To (My Lovely)" by Peter Sarstedt is prominently featured as well, being played within the film more than once. Most of the album, however, features film score music composed by Bengali filmmaker Satyajit Ray, Merchant Ivory films, and other artists from Indian cinema. Director Wes Anderson has said that it was Satyajit Ray's movies that made him want to come to India. The works include "Charu's Theme", from Ray's 1964 film Charulata, film-score cues by Shankar Jaikishan and classic works by Debussy and Beethoven. The film ends with the 1969 song "Les Champs-Élysées" by French singer Joe Dassin, who was the son of blacklisted American director Jules Dassin.

== Release ==
The Darjeeling Limited made its world premiere on 3 September 2007 at the Venice Film Festival, where it was in competition for the Golden Lion and won the Little Golden Lion. The film's North American premiere was on 28 September 2007 at the 45th annual New York Film Festival, where it was the opening film. It then opened in a limited commercial release in North America on 5 October 2007. The film opened across North America on 26 October 2007 and in the UK on 23 November 2007, in both territories preceded in showings by Hotel Chevalier. The film grossed $134,938 in two theaters in its opening weekend, for an average of $67,469 for each theater.

=== Home media ===
The film was released on DVD on 26 February 2008, and re-released by The Criterion Collection on 12 October 2010 on DVD and Blu-ray. It was released on Ultra HD Blu-ray by Criterion on September 30, 2025, as part of the ten film collection The Wes Anderson Archive: Ten Films, Twenty-Five Years.

== Reception ==
On Rotten Tomatoes the film holds an approval rating of 69% based on 193 reviews, with an average rating of 6.7/10. The site's critical consensus reads, "With the requisite combination of humor, sorrow, and outstanding visuals, The Darjeeling Limited will satisfy Wes Anderson fans." On Metacritic, the film has a score of 67 out of 100, based on 35 reviews, indicating "generally favorable reviews".

Roger Ebert of the Chicago Sun-Times awarded the film 3.5 out of 4 stars, praising its Indian setting and noting that Anderson "uses India not in a touristy way, but as a backdrop that is very, very there." Chris Cabin of Filmcritic.com gave the film 4 out of 5 stars, calling it Anderson's "best work to date." Lisa Schwarzbaum of Entertainment Weekly gave it a "B+", describing it as a familiar psychological and stylistic journey for Anderson, but with "a startling new maturity." A. O. Scott of The New York Times called the film "an odd, flawed, but nonetheless beautifully handmade object," and noted its sentimental value despite its self-regard.

Other positive reviews came from Timothy Knight of Reel.com (3 out of 4 stars), who considered it an improvement over The Life Aquatic with Steve Zissou (2004), and Nathan Lee of The Village Voice, who likened the film to The Royal Tenenbaums (2001) and described it as a movie about emotional baggage and letting go. Peter Rainer of The Christian Science Monitor noted that Anderson's unique filmmaking approach results in a mix of strengths and weaknesses. David Edelstein of New York Magazine called the film "hit and miss", but praised its sustained tone of lyrical melancholy.

Less favorable reviews came from Nick Schager of Slant Magazine, who gave it 2 out of 4 stars and criticized the recurring stylistic elements of Anderson's films as limitations. Emanuel Levy gave it a "C", arguing that Anderson's thematic and stylistic repetition confined the film, despite the new setting and collaborators. Dana Stevens of Slate suggested that Anderson might benefit from directing a screenplay written by someone else to refresh his perspective.

Glenn Kenny of Première named The Darjeeling Limited the fifth-best film of 2007, and Mike Russell of The Oregonian ranked it eighth on his year-end list.

=== Awards and nominations ===
Award	Date of ceremony	Category	Nominee(s)	Result	Ref.
AARP Movies for Grownups Awards	February 4, 2008	Best Comedy	The Darjeeling Limited	Won	
Bodil Awards	February 24, 2008	Best American Film	Wes Anderson	Nominated	
New York Film Critics Online	December 9, 2007	Top Films of the Year	The Darjeeling Limited	Won	
New York Film Critics Online	December 9, 2007	Best Screenplay	Wes Anderson, Jason Schwartzman, and Roman Coppola	Won	
Venice Film Festival	September 8, 2007	Golden Lion	Wes Anderson	Nominated	
Venice Film Festival	September 8, 2007	Little Golden Lion	Wes Anderson	Won	
