= Apeman (song) =

- French picture sleeve

Single by the Kinks

from the album Lola Versus Powerman and the Moneygoround, Part One
- B-side: "Rats"
- Released: 27 November 1970
- Recorded: August–September 1970 (Note: For the US single, Ray rerecorded the lyric "fuckin'" as "foggin'" on 16–18 November 1970.)
- Studio: Morgan, London
- Genre: Rock; calypso
- Length: 3:54
- Label: Pye (UK); Reprise (US)
- Songwriter: Ray Davies
- Producer: Ray Davies

The Kinks singles chronology
"Lola" (1970)	"Apeman" (1970)	"God's Children" (1971)

Music video
- "Apeman" on YouTube

"Apeman" is a 1970 song by the English rock band the Kinks. It was written by Ray Davies and appears on the album Lola Versus Powerman and the Moneygoround, Part One. Written as a call to return to nature amidst the crowding and industry of the city, the song features calypso stylings. Like its predecessor, "Lola", it had to have a lyric re-dubbed for commercial release.

"Apeman" was a successful follow-up to "Lola", reaching number five on the British charts. It has since attracted critical acclaim.

== Background ==
"Apeman", alongside many other songs from the Lola vs. Powerman album, was written by Ray Davies during a family trip to Cornwall in July 1970. In the song, Davies is fed up with the modern world and declares that he wants to "sail away to a distant shore and make like an apeman". He also expresses how man created our problems and, given half a chance, he would leave the cities and traffic to live in the jungle. It reflects the nostalgia expressed on the albums Lola vs. Powerman and The Kinks Are the Village Green Preservation Society.

Davies wrote the song as a follow-up to "Lola" and confirmed that, "in a way", it was his declaration of getting back in touch with nature. He also recounted an encounter with a fan in San Francisco about the band's gay appeal following "Lola":

Oddly enough, I'd already made 'Apeman', as a follow-up to 'Lola' and it was just ready to come out when I met a fan in San Francisco who said 'you've got to make a record after 'Lola' or they'll all think you're gay, or something. You gotta make a record like 'Superman' or 'Gorilla Man'!' And I said, 'That's really strange! My new record is called 'Apeman'!' But if I'd deliberately set out to do that I probably would have come off looking even more like a queen!

It is performed in the calypso genre, a style Davies first explored with "I'm on an Island" (1965).

== Single release ==
"Apeman" was released as a single in the fall of 1970, with a B-side of the Dave Davies composition "Rats". While it did not do as well on the US Pop Singles chart as its predecessor "Lola" did, only reaching number 45, it was a major hit in the UK, peaking at number five in the singles chart, their last Top 10 entry in their home country. It also reached number 9 in Australia.

Due to publishing issues the band was experiencing at the time, the British edition of the single was published under "Copyright Control", a term used when no publisher is assigned.

=== Controversy and re-dubbing ===
The Kinks provoked some controversy, because in the line "...the air pollution is a-foggin' up my eyes...", the word "a-foggin'" sounded too much like "a-fucking". Like the band's previous single "Lola", where Ray Davies had to change "Coca-Cola" to "cherry cola", he again had to fly back to London to re-record this line, dubbing over with a more clear "a-foggin'" prior to its single release, in turn causing a delay in the US single release of the tune. The original lyric remains intact on the album, and is heard at 2:20. On their performance on Top of the Pops, filmed later in November, the changed lyric can be heard on the backing tape.

== Promo video ==
A colour promo video made for the song was filmed at Hampstead Heath, the same location used for the cover picture of the album The Kinks Are the Village Green Preservation Society. The video featured the band's newly recruited pianist John Gosling dressed up as an ape. The Kinks guitarist Dave Davies said of this, "It was [manager] Grenville [Collins] who thought we should use a piano and keyboards. So John Gosling joined thinking that, 'Hey man, I've hit it big!' We very quickly brought him down to earth. He was Lola for that song and then an ape [for 'Apeman']."

== Reception ==
Upon release in Britain, the NME called the song "a very commercial disc with an irresistible hook chorus". Record Mirror said: "As ever, Ray [Davies] has something to say. As ever The Kinks do a thoroughly professional, style-changing job." After its US release, Billboard praised the song as "an easy-beat calypso rocker with a clever lyric". Record World said that "Ray Davies and co. have a natural with this calypso-flavored cut from their new album complete with bird noises and other interesting effects." Cash Box called it "a satirical pop venture whose sound and lyrics should reap the benefits of AM and FM exposure to thrust it toward the charts".

In 2018, The Telegraph named "Apeman" as the second-greatest song by Ray Davies and the Kinks, calling it "Ostensibly a satire on hippy culture [...] Although the reggae-infused piano on the track is still delicious more than 40 years later, the combination of Ray Davies's faux-Caribbean accent and his 'apeman' references are not exactly politically correct these days."

== Personnel ==
According to band researcher Doug Hinman:

- Ray Davies – lead vocal, guitar
- Dave Davies – backing vocal; acoustic and electric guitars
- John Dalton – bass guitar
- Mick Avory – drums
- John Gosling – baby grand piano, electric piano

== Chart performance ==
Chart (1970–71)	Peak position
Canada RPM Top Singles	19
Germany (GfK)	8
Netherlands (Dutch Top 40)	14
New Zealand (Listener)	5
South Africa (Springbok Radio)	12
Sweden (Tio i Topp)	10
Switzerland (Schweizer Hitparade)	7
UK Singles (Official Charts)	5
US Billboard Hot 100	45

== Cover versions and usage in popular culture ==
"Apeman" is featured in the 2004 film Mondovino, the 1986 films Club Paradise starring Robin Williams (although it's a different mix than the album, more Caribbean to fit the movie) and Link starring Terence Stamp and Netflix's 2023 film Old Dads. It was used in the first episode of the comedy television series The Last Man on Earth to show the lead character's descent into a primitive living once civilization has ended.

"Apeman" was covered by British singer and teenage heartthrob Jack Wild on his 1971 album Everything's Coming Up Roses, by the Esso Trinidad Steel Band in 1971 on their self-titled album, by Fish for his 1993 album Songs from the Mirror and by the Format, who included it on their 2007 album B-Sides & Rarities.

In 1989, "Apeman" appeared in a UK television advertisement for Ski yoghurts, with re-written lyrics announcing "I Like A Ski, Man".
