= Mike Cotton (musician) =

English jazz and R&B musician

- Born: Michael Edward Cotton; 12 August 1939 (age 86); Tottenham, North London
- Origin: Hackney, London
- Genres: Jazz, R&B, rock
- Instruments: Trumpet, flugelhorn, harmonica, vocals
- Labels: Columbia Records

Michael Edward Cotton (born 12 August 1939) is an English jazz and R&B trumpeter, flugelhornist, harmonicist, vocalist and bandleader born in Tottenham, North London. He is best known for leading his band under the names The Mike Cotton Jazzmen and The Mike Cotton Sound. Cotton currently plays with the Stars of British Jazz.

== Career ==
Mike Cotton formed The Mike Cotton Jazzmen in the early 1950s during the "Trad jazz" boom. From 1962 he changed the group's name to The Mike Cotton Sound, and their musical direction to a more pop-based style, achieving a UK chart hit single "Swing That Hammer" that year. They appeared in a performance in the 1962 film The Wild and the Willing.

Member Dave Rowberry left the band in 1965 to join The Animals, and among those who auditioned to take his place were Elton John and Joe Cocker. Ultimately the position went to Steve Gray who went on to play in The Eric Delaney Band and Sky. In 1966 Cotton changed the band's style again to a more soul-based sound and brought in a second vocalist, a former American airman named Bruce McPherson Lucas, known by his surname. He had been working with bands in the Norwich area. The band backed a number of artists in live and studio work at various times during the 1960s, including Sugar Pie DeSanto, Gene Pitney, Stevie Wonder, Doris Troy, The Four Tops and Solomon Burke.

When their bass player, Jim Rodford, joined his cousin Rod Argent in his new band Argent in 1969, Cotton changed the band's name to the more modern-sounding Satisfaction, and the band recorded one album under that name in 1970 before splitting up. He retained the brass section, and this line-up, working again under the name Mike Cotton Sound, joined The Kinks, first on their 1971 album Muswell Hillbillies, and then appearing with them both in the studio and in concert until the mid-1970s, after which Cotton returned to playing jazz.

In 1968 as The Mike Cotton Sound, they worked with record producer and BBC Radio One DJ Mike Raven to release their version of King Curtis' "Soul Serenade", which Raven then went on to use as his soul and R&B radio show theme tune on Radio One.

== Select discography ==
=== Albums ===
- The Mike Cotton Sound (Columbia)

With Andy Cooper

- Andy Cooper's Euro Top 8 (TIM AG)

=== Singles ===
- "Swing That Hammer" (1963) – UK No. 36
