= John Gosling (The Kinks musician) =

British musician (1948–2023)

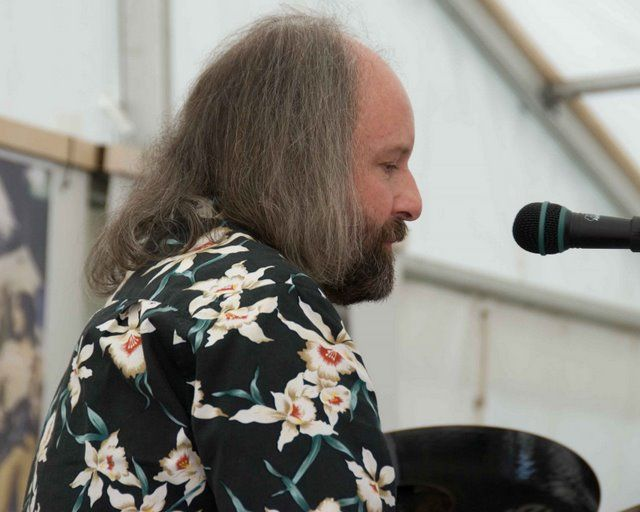
- Gosling in 2009

Background information
- Also known as: The Baptist
- Born: 6 February 1948; Paignton, Devon, England
- Died: 4 August 2023 (aged 75) Berkhamsted, Hertfordshire, England
- Genres: Rock, pop
- Occupation: Musician
- Instruments: Keyboards, piano, vocals
- Formerly of: The Kinks, The Kast Off Kinks

John "The Baptist" Gosling (6 February 1948 – 4 August 2023) was a British keyboardist, pianist and vocalist, best known for being a member of the rock band the Kinks from 1970 to 1978, and was later a member of the Kast Off Kinks, a spin-off band composed of former members.

== Early life and education ==
John Gosling was born in Paignton, Devon, on 6 February 1948. As a child his first musical instrument was a harmonium, which he received as a Christmas present. He studied at the Royal Academy of Music, and was appointed organist of St Andrew's Church in Stoke Newington. He also attended Luton Sixth Form College.

== Career ==
Gosling's first band, the Challengers, was formed after he and a friend heard the Kinks performing "Long Tall Sally" on the BBC radio show Saturday Club. He also played in a local band called Hard Rain, a Bob Dylan–inspired group that he formed at the Royal Academy of Music. Hard Rain recorded a few songs on a reel of tape; he lent this to a member of the Kinks, and never saw it again. Gosling could also play the bass and guitar. His influences were Ian McLagan of the Small Faces and Faces, Steve Winwood of the Spencer Davis Group and Traffic, Matthew Fisher of Procol Harum, Paul McCartney, and Little Richard.

Gosling joined the Kinks in 1970, after a successful audition of the band's song "Lola". John played the baby grand piano on the song. His first performance with them was in Minneapolis, USA, on 22 May 1970. He was replaced by Gordon Edwards in 1978; his last gig with the Kinks was on Christmas Eve 1977. He was called "The Baptist" because of his likeness to popular images of John the Baptist. According to Gosling in the 2000s, he still had a good relationship with the Kinks members he worked with, although he hadn't spoke to Dave Davies since his departure. Gosling wrote a book about his days in the Kinks.

Gosling had a spat with Kinks frontman Ray Davies over his comments of the members. Gosling said he had "responded to Ray's interview a bit hot-headedly – he seemed to infer that one occasion I couldn't finish a track because I was drunk, and that upset me. I'd also just read elsewhere that he was of the opinion that ‘the drinkers in the band’ just wanted to get each new song over with so they could go down the pub! Not true, any of it. He had a loyal band of musicians working with him, but I don't think that at the time he realised it."

Following his departure, he briefly played in a band called Network with fellow Kink Andy Pyle. In 1994, Gosling founded the Kast Off Kinks, alongside former band members Mick Avory, Jim Rodford and John Dalton. He retired in 2008.

== Personal life and death ==
Gosling opened a music shop in Berkhamsted, then became a music teacher.

John Gosling died on 4 August 2023, at the age of 75.
