= Lola (song) =

1970 song by The Kinks

- West German single sleeve

Single by the Kinks

from the album Lola Versus Powerman and the Moneygoround, Part One
- B-side: "Berkeley Mews" (UK); "Mindless Child of Motherhood" (US)
- Released: 12 June 1970
- Recorded: April–May 1970
- Studio: Morgan, Willesden, London
- Genre: Rock; folk rock; hard rock; pop
- Length: 4:03
- Label: Pye (UK); Reprise (US)
- Songwriter: Ray Davies
- Producer: Ray Davies

The Kinks singles chronology
"Victoria" (1969)	"Lola" (1970)	"Apeman" (1970)

Alternative cover
- Scandinavian single sleeve

Music video
- "Lola" on YouTube

"Lola" is a song by the English rock band the Kinks, written by frontman Ray Davies for their 1970 album Lola Versus Powerman and the Moneygoround, Part One. The song details a romantic encounter in a Soho bar between a young man and Lola, who is possibly a trans woman or cross-dresser. In the song, the narrator describes his confusion towards Lola, who "walked like a woman but talked like a man", yet he remains infatuated with her.

The song was released as a single in the United Kingdom on 12 June 1970, while in the United States it was released on 28 June 1970. Commercially, "Lola" reached number two on the UK Singles Chart and number nine on the Billboard Hot 100. The track has since become one of the Kinks' most popular songs and appears on Rolling Stone and NME's lists of the 500 greatest songs of all time.

Since its release, "Lola" has appeared on multiple compilation and live albums. In 1980, a live version of the song from the album One for the Road was released as a single in the US and some European countries, becoming a minor hit. In the Netherlands, it reached number 1, just as it did in 1970 with the studio version. Other versions include an instrumental on the band's 1971 movie soundtrack album Percy and live renditions from 1972's Everybody's in Show-Biz and 1996's To the Bone. The Lola character also appears in the lyrics of the band's 1981 song "Destroyer".

== Origin and inspiration ==
It was a real experience in a club. I was asked to dance by somebody who was a fabulous looking woman. I said "no thank you". And she went in a cab with my manager straight afterwards. It's based on a personal experience. But not every word.

— Ray Davies

Ray Davies has claimed that he was inspired to write "Lola" after Kinks manager Robert Wace spent a night in Paris dancing with a cross-dresser. Davies said of the incident, "In his apartment, Robert had been dancing with this black woman, and he said, 'I'm really onto a thing here.' And it was okay until we left at six in the morning and then I said, 'Have you seen the stubble?' He said 'Yeah', but he was too pissed [intoxicated] to care, I think".

Drummer Mick Avory has offered an alternative explanation for the song's lyrics, claiming that "Lola" was partially inspired by Avory's frequenting of certain bars in West London. Avory said:

We used to know this character called Michael McGrath. He used to hound the group a bit, because being called The Kinks did attract these sorts of people. He used to come down to Top of the Pops, and he was publicist for John Stephen's shop in Carnaby Street. He used to have this place in Earl's Court, and he used to invite me to all these drag queen acts and transsexual pubs. They were like secret clubs. And that's where Ray [Davies] got the idea for 'Lola'. When he was invited too, he wrote it while I was getting drunk.

Ray Davies claimed to have done "a bit of research with drag queens" for the song's lyrics. He has denied claims that the song was written about a date between himself and Candy Darling – Davies contends the two only went out to dinner together and that he had known the whole time that Darling was transgender.

In his autobiography, Dave Davies said that he came up with the music for what would become "Lola", noting that his brother Ray added the lyrics after hearing it. In a 1990 interview, Dave Davies stated that "Lola" was written similarly to "You Really Got Me" in that the two worked on Ray's basic skeleton of the song, saying that the song was more of a collaborative effort than many believed.

== Writing and recording ==
I remember going into a music store on Shaftesbury Avenue when we were about to make "Lola". I said, "I want to get a really good guitar sound on this record, I want a Martin". And in the corner they had this old 1938 Dobro resonator guitar that I bought for £150. I put them together on "Lola" which is what makes that clangy sound: the combination of the Martin and the Dobro with heavy compression.

— Ray Davies

Written in April 1970, "Lola" was cited by Ray Davies as the first song he wrote following a break he took to act in the 1970 Play for Today film The Long Distance Piano Player. Davies said that he had initially struggled with writing an opening that would sell the song, but the rest of the song "came naturally". He noted that he knew the song would be successful when he heard his one-year-old daughter singing the chorus, stating, "She was crawling around singing 'la la, la la Lola.' I thought, 'If she can join in and sing, Kinks fans can do it.'"

Initial recordings of the song began in April 1970, but, as the band's bassist John Dalton remembered, recording for "Lola" took particularly long, stretching into the next month. During April, four to five versions were attempted, utilizing different keys as well as varying beginnings and styles. In May, new piano parts were added to the backing track by John Gosling, the band's new piano player who had just been auditioned. Vocals were also added at this time. The song was then mixed during that month. Mick Avory remembered the recording sessions for the song positively, saying that it "was fun, as it was the Baptist's [John Gosling's] first recording with us".

The guitar opening on the song was produced as a result of combining the sound of a Martin guitar and a vintage Dobro resonator guitar. Ray Davies cited this blend of guitar sounds for the song's unique guitar sound.

== Release ==
I wanted to write a hit [with "Lola".] It wasn't just the song. It was the musical design. It wasn't a power chord song like "You Really Got Me". It was a power chord beginning. It needed a special acoustic guitar sound ... sonorous, growling, with an attack to it.

— Ray Davies, Radio 4's Master Tapes

Despite the chart success "Lola" would achieve, its fellow Lola vs. Powerman track "Powerman" was initially considered to be the first single from the album. However, "Lola", which Ray Davies later claimed was an attempt to write a hit, was eventually decided on as the debut single release.

"Lola" was released as a single in 1970. In the UK, the B-side to the single was The Kinks Are the Village Green Preservation Society outtake "Berkeley Mews" while the Dave Davies-penned "Mindless Child of Motherhood" was used in the US. It became an unexpected chart smash for the Kinks, reaching number two in Britain and number nine in the United States. The single also saw success worldwide, reaching the top of the charts in Ireland, New Zealand, and South Africa, as well as the top 5 in Germany, Austria, Belgium, Switzerland and it reached number six in Australia. The success of the single had significant ramifications for the band's career at a critical time, allowing them to negotiate a new contract with RCA Records, construct their own London Studio, and assume more creative and managerial control. In a 1970 interview, Dave Davies stated that, if "Lola" had been a failure, the band would have "gone on making records for another year or so and then drifted apart".

Although the track was a significant hit for the band, Dave Davies did not enjoy the success of "Lola", saying, "In fact, when 'Lola' was a hit, it made me feel a bit uncomfortable. Because it was taking us out of a different sort of comfort zone, where we'd been getting into the work, and the writing and the musicality was more thought about. It did have that smell of: 'Oh blimey, not that again.' I found it a bit odd, that period. And then it got odder and weirder". Conversely, Mick Avory said that he "enjoyed the success" the band had with "Lola" and its follow-up, "Apeman".

== Controversy ==
Originally, "Lola" saw controversy in the UK for its lyrics. In a Record Mirror article entitled "'Sex Change' Record: Kink Speaks", Ray Davies addressed the matter, saying, "It really doesn't matter what sex Lola is, I think she's all right". Some radio stations faded the track out before implications of Lola's biological sex were revealed. On 18 November 1970, "Lola" was banned from being played by several radio stations in Australia because of its "controversial subject matter", though some began playing "Lola" again after having made a crude edit, which sounded like the record had jumped a groove, to remove the line "But, I know what I am and I'm glad I'm a man and so's Lola".

The BBC banned the track for a different reason: the original stereo recording had the words "Coca-Cola" in the lyrics, but because of BBC Radio's policy against product placement, Ray Davies was forced to make a 6,000-mile (9,700 km) round-trip flight from New York to London and back on 3 June 1970, interrupting the band's American tour, to change those words to the generic "cherry cola" for the single release, which is included on various compilation albums as well. (Note: Ray Davies later stated that, like in the lyrics of "Lola", he had actually drunk champagne that tastes like cola, saying, "I had a Californian champagne that tasted like it, in some kind of L.A. bordello tourist trap".)

== Reception and legacy ==
"Lola" received positive reviews from critics. Upon the single's release, the NME praised the song as "an engaging and sparkling piece with a gay Latin flavour and a catchy hook chorus". Writing a contemporary review in Creem, critic Dave Marsh recognized it as "the first significantly blatant gay-rock ballad". Billboard said of the song at the time of its US release, "Currently a top ten British chart winner, this infectious rhythm item has all the ingredients to put the Kinks right back up the Hot 100 here with solid impact". Record World praised the "first-rate" production. Rolling Stone critic Paul Gambaccini called the song "brilliant and a smash". Music critic Robert Christgau, despite his mixed opinion on the Lola vs. Powerman album, praised the single as "astounding". Stephen Thomas Erlewine of AllMusic lauded the song for "its crisp, muscular sound, pitched halfway between acoustic folk and hard rock". Ultimate Classic Rock ranked "Lola" as the Kinks' third best song, saying "the great guitar riff that feeds the song is one of Dave's all-time greatest". Paste magazine listed the track as the band's fourth best song. In 2004, the song appeared on Rolling Stone's list of the "500 Greatest Songs of All Time" at number 422. It was removed from the list on their 2011 revision of the ranking before reappearing at number 386 on the 2021 revised list. It was also ranked number 473 on NME's own "The 500 Greatest Songs of All Time" list.

The song was also well-liked by the band. Mick Avory, who noted the song as one of the songs he was most proud to be associated with, said "I always liked 'Lola', I liked the subject. It's not like anything else. I liked it for that. We'd always take a different path". In a 1983 interview, Ray Davies said, "I'm just very pleased I recorded it and more pleased I wrote it". The band revisited the "Lola" character in the lyrics of their 1981 song, "Destroyer", a minor chart hit in America.

Satirical artist "Weird Al" Yankovic created a parody of the song called "Yoda", featuring lyrics about the Star Wars character of the same name, on his 1985 album Dare to Be Stupid.

In March 2026, American musician Moby called the lyrics "gross and transphobic" and "unevolved" in an interview with The Guardian when asked to respond to the prompt "The song I can no longer listen to". Ray Davies' brother Dave defended the song and quoted trans singer Jayne County as saying "When I [first] heard the song I was both thrilled and amazed that the Kinks would be singing a song about a trans person and wondered if anyone else had picked up on it! Who was cool or hip enough to realize what The Kinks were singing about!"

== Live versions ==
"Lola (live)"

Single by the Kinks

from the album One for the Road
- B-side: "Celluloid Heroes" (live)
- Released: 23 July 1980
- Recorded: 23 September 1979
- Venue: Providence Civic Center, Providence, Rhode Island
- Length: 3:56
- Label: Arista (US)
- Songwriter: Ray Davies

The Kinks US singles chronology
"Catch Me Now I'm Falling" (1979)	"Lola (live)" (1980)	"You Really Got Me (live)" (1980)

Since its release, "Lola" became a mainstay in the Kinks' live repertoire, appearing in the majority of the band's subsequent set-lists until the group's break-up. In 1972, a live performance of the song recorded at Carnegie Hall in New York City appeared on the live half of the band's 1972 album, Everybody's in Show-Biz, a double-LP which contained half new studio compositions and half live versions of previously released songs.

A live version of "Lola", recorded on 23 September 1979 in Providence, Rhode Island, was released as a single in the US in July 1980 to promote the live album One for the Road. The B-side was the live version of "Celluloid Heroes". The single was a moderate success, reaching number 81 on the Billboard Hot 100. It was also released in some countries in Europe (although not the UK) in April 1981. It topped the charts in both the Netherlands, matching the number one peak of the original version, and in Belgium, where it exceeded the original's peak of three. It also charted in Australia, peaking at number 69 and spending 22 weeks on the charts. Although not released as a stand-alone single in the UK, it was included on a bonus single (backed with a live version of "David Watts" from the same album) with initial copies of "Better Things" in June 1981. This live rendition, along with the live versions of "Celluloid Heroes" and "You Really Got Me" from the same album, also appeared on the 1986 compilation album Come Dancing with The Kinks: The Best of the Kinks 1977–1986.

Although it did not appear on the original 1994 version, another live version of "Lola" was included on the 1996 US double-album release of To the Bone, the band's final release of new material before their dissolution.

== Personnel ==
According to Doug Hinman, the following musicians played on the Kinks' original version of "Lola":

=== The Kinks ===
- Ray Davies – lead vocal; acoustic and resonator guitars
- Dave Davies – backing vocal, electric guitar
- John Dalton – bass
- Mick Avory – drums

=== Additional personnel ===
- John Gosling – baby grand piano
- Ken Jones – maracas

== Charts ==
=== Weekly charts ===
Studio version

Chart (1970–1971)	Peak position
Australia (Go-Set)	6
Austria (Ö3 Austria Top 40)	2
Canada Top Singles (RPM)	2
Belgium (Ultratop 50 Flanders)	3
Ireland (IRMA)	1
Netherlands (Dutch Top 40)	1
Netherlands (Single Top 100)	1
New Zealand (Listener)	1
South Africa (Springbok)	1
Sweden (Kvällstoppen)	5
Sweden (Tio i Topp)	2
Switzerland (Schweizer Hitparade)	4
UK Singles (Official Charts)	2
US Billboard Hot 100	9
US Cash Box Top 100	8
West Germany (GfK)	2

Live version

Chart (1980–1981)	Peak position
Belgium (Ultratop 50 Flanders)	1
Netherlands (Dutch Top 40)	1
Netherlands (Single Top 100)	1
US Billboard Hot 100	81

=== Year-end charts ===
Chart (1970)	Rank
Canada Top Singles (RPM)	38
Netherlands (Single Top 100)	4
South Africa	13
US Billboard Hot 100	52
US Cash Box	78

== Certifications ==
Region	Certification	Certified units/sales
United Kingdom (BPI)	Platinum	600,000^{‡}
^{‡} Sales+streaming figures based on certification alone.

== Other versions ==
Post-punk band the Raincoats recorded a version of "Lola" on their 1979 album The Raincoats. In 1990, former Duran Duran and Power Station member Andy Taylor released his version as the lead single from his second solo album, Dangerous. "Lola" peaked at No. 60 on the UK Singles Chart. The British band Madness released a ska version of "Lola" on their 2005 album, The Dangermen Sessions, Volume One. The Danish band Natural Born Hippies produced their cover "Lola (if you ever)" in 1999. In 2022 the American band Ugly Kid Joe released their cover on the album Rad Wings of Destiny.

== See also ==
- List of songs banned by the BBC
- List of Dutch Top 40 number-one singles of 1970
- List of Dutch Top 40 number-one singles of 1981
- List of number-one singles of 1970 (Ireland)
- List of number-one singles in 1970 (New Zealand)
