= John Dalton (musician) =

British bass guitar player (born 1943)

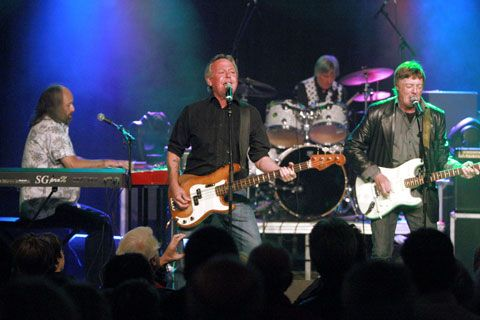
- Dalton with the Kast Off Kinks (2009)

Background information
- Born: 21 May 1943 (age 83); Chipping Barnet, London, England
- Origin: Enfield, Middlesex, England
- Genres: Rock, pop
- Occupation: Musician
- Instruments: Bass, guitar
- Years active: 1959–present
- Label: Pye
- Website: http://john-dalton.kastoffkinks.co.uk

John Dalton (born 21 May 1943) is a British bass guitarist, most notable as a member of the Kinks in 1966 and between 1969 and 1976, replacing original member Pete Quaife.

== Biography ==
John Dalton was educated at Cheshunt Secondary Modern School at the same time as Harry Webb (who later found fame as Cliff Richard). Dalton's desire was to be a full-time musician, and in 1959 he joined Danny King and the Bluejacks as bass guitarist (although he claimed in a 2009 interview, that he could not play a note when he joined). He played alongside Norman Mitham who had just left Cliff Richard's first band.

== Career ==
=== The Bluejacks and Mark Four (1959–1966) ===
Although successful locally, the Bluejacks recordings of "Say Mama" and Vince Taylor's rockabilly "Brand New Cadillac" did not feature in the UK Singles Chart, and in 1962 Dalton left to become a founder member of the Mark Four along with Mick 'Spud' Thompson (rhythm guitar), Eddie Phillips (lead guitar), Jack Jones (drums) and Kenny Pickett (vocals). Mark Four quickly became one of the most popular live bands in North London and shared billing with other London-based groups such as the High Numbers (later to become the Who), Cliff Bennett and the Rebel Rousers, and even sharing a stage with Little Eva.

However, the band's singles failed to make the charts, making it difficult to earn enough money to support a family. In 1966 Dalton left Mark Four to join the building trade. Shortly afterwards Phillips, Jones and Pickett founded the Creation, one of the most influential bands of the late 1960s.

=== The Kinks (1966; 1969–1976) ===
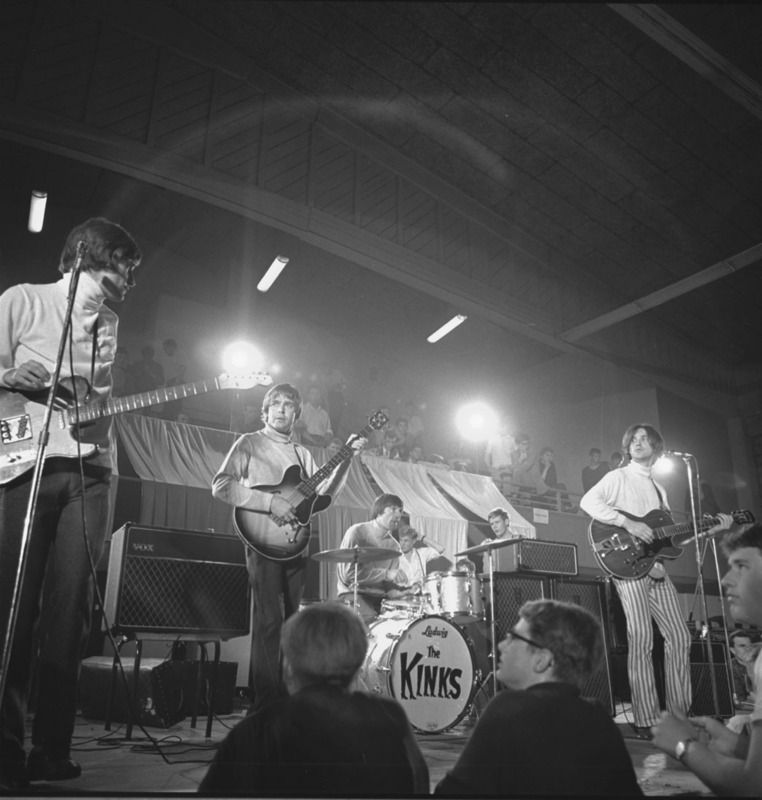
Dalton (second from left) playing bass for the Kinks in 1966, filling in for the injured Pete Quaife

In June 1966, Dalton was asked to substitute for the Kinks' bass guitarist, Pete Quaife, who had broken his leg in a car accident. Dalton auditioned as a temporary replacement on 9 June 1966 at Carling Music, Savile Row, London. That same evening he appeared with the band on BBC Television's pop music flagship, Top of the Pops (filmed in the BBC Studios, London). His first live appearance with the Kinks was two days later at The Plaza, King's Heath, Birmingham giving him no time for rehearsals. This was quickly followed by a tour to Norway and Spain. The first recording sessions he took part in with the Kinks were on 26 June 1966 at Pye Studios, London for "Little Miss Queen of Darkness" (although Quaife claimed he was the bassist for that track in a 2005 interview). Dalton also played bass on "Dead End Street", recorded on 28 October 1966 during an evening session (unusually, without Shel Talmy). Shortly after his accident, Quaife announced he was not returning, only to change his mind and successfully requesting to come back in November 1966, leaving Dalton to return to his day job.

Dalton replaced Quaife again in 1969, this time as the Kinks' permanent bassist. He appeared with the band on 5 April 1969 for a mimed performance on the television program "It's Dee Time". His first recording session in his second tenure with the group was in May 1969 at Pye Studio #2 ("Drivin'" and "Mindless Child of Motherhood"). Dalton spent most of June recording the Arthur album. He started his first American tour on 17 October at the Fillmore East, New York City. The tour lasted nine weeks and included such venues as The Whisky A Go Go in Los Angeles and Fillmore West in San Francisco. He continued to play with the Kinks throughout the remainder of 1969 and into the 1970s and appeared playing bass on such notable songs as "Victoria", "Lola", "Apeman", "Celluloid Heroes", and "Supersonic Rocket Ship".

On 8 November 1976, Dalton left the Kinks, after spending most of the summer of 1976 rehearsing and recording Sleepwalker. His replacement was former Blodwyn Pig bass player Andy Pyle.

=== After the Kinks (1979– ) ===
Dalton is still active in the music industry. He has been frontman and bass player with the Kast Off Kinks which has also featured Mick Avory, (the original Kinks drummer), John Gosling (former Kinks keyboard player), and vocalist/guitarist Dave Clarke (former Tim Rose sidesman). He and Gosling retired from the Kast Off Kinks in 2008, to be replaced by the bassist and keyboard player who replaced them in the Kinks – Jim Rodford and Ian Gibbons. But Dalton does still play with the band (Rodford died on 20 January 2018).

From 2003 until May 2008 Dalton also performed with the rock and roll band 5% Volume, alongside Kevin Leak (ex Seminar), Wol Webster (ex Blues Brothers, Eddie Floyd, Jess Conrad) and Tony 'Bones' Pallett (son of Joe Pallett the original Danny King).
