= Julia (Nick & Simon song) =

Single by Nick & Simon

from the album Sterker
- Released: 8 March 2013
- Genre: Palingsound, Nederpop
- Length: 3:37
- Label: Artist & Company
- Songwriter: Nick Schilder
- Producer: Gordon Groothedde

Nick & Simon singles chronology
"Ze Lijkt Net Niet Op Jou" (2012)	"Julia" (2013)

"Julia" is a single by the Dutch duo Nick & Simon, consisting of the singers Nick Schilder and Simon Keizer from Volendam. The song was released on 8 March 2013. The song was written by Schilder and was produced by Gordon Groothedde.

Nick & Simon released many different versions of the song, each with another female given name as title. Eight versions were released on CD, but on iTunes 154 versions were released (see different versions). Nick & Simon established a record in the Guinness Book of Records with this song, because they released 155 singles on one day. This has never been done before.

The single debuted at the peak position in both the Dutch Top 40 and the Mega Single Top 100. The song became the first number-one single for Nick & Simon in the Dutch Top 40 and the first number-one debut in that chart since Lady Gaga's "Born This Way" in 2011. "Julia" was the tenth number-one single for the duo in the Mega Single Top 100.

== Charts ==
=== Weekly charts ===
Chart (2013)	Peak position
Belgium (Ultratip Bubbling Under Flanders)	42
Netherlands (Dutch Top 40)	1
Netherlands (Single Top 100)	1

=== Year-end charts ===
Chart (2013)	Position
Netherlands (Dutch Top 40)	82
Netherlands (Single Top 100)	52

== Different versions ==
Nick & Simon released 155 versions of the song: "Julia" and 154 other names. Below a list of the different versions.

- Julia (original version)
- Julia (Aaltje version)
- Julia (Amber version)
- Julia (Amina version)
- Julia (Amy version)
- Julia (Angela version)
- Julia (Anke version)
- Julia (Annabel version)
- Julia (Anne version)
- Julia (Anne Marie version)
- Julia (Anouk version)
- Julia (Barbara version)
- Julia (Bente version)
- Julia (Bianca version)
- Julia (Brenda version)
- Julia (Britt version)
- Julia (Carlijn version)
- Julia (Carmen version)
- Julia (Chantal version)
- Julia (Charlotte version)
- Julia (Danielle version)
- Julia (Danique version)
- Julia (Daphne version)
- Julia (Deborah version)
- Julia (Demi version)
- Julia (Denise version)
- Julia (Desiree version)
- Julia (Eline version)
- Julia (Elisa version)
- Julia (Elisabeth version)
- Julia (Elise version)
- Julia (Emma version)
- Julia (Esmee version)
- Julia (Esther version)
- Julia (Eva version)
- Julia (Evelien version)
- Julia (Ezra version)
- Julia (Fatima version)
- Julia (Feline version)
- Julia (Femke version)
- Julia (Fenna version)
- Julia (Fien version)
- Julia (Fleur version)
- Julia (Floor version)
- Julia (Frederique version)
- Julia (Gerda version)
- Julia (Guusje version)
- Julia (Hannah version)
- Julia (Ilona version)
- Julia (Ilse version)
- Julia (Imane version)
- Julia (Inge version)
- Julia (Iris version)
- Julia (Isa version)
- Julia (Jacqueline version)
- Julia (Janine version)
- Julia (Janneke version)
- Julia (Jasmijn version)
- Julia (Jasmine version)
- Julia (Jennifer version)
- Julia (Jessica version)
- Julia (Johanna version)
- Julia (Jolanda version)
- Julia (Jolien version)
- Julia (Josephien version)
- Julia (Joyce version)
- Julia (Judith version)
- Julia (Juliette version)
- Julia (Karin version)
- Julia (Kayleigh version)
- Julia (Kelly version)
- Julia (Kim version)
- Julia (Kimberly version)
- Julia (Kirsten version)
- Julia (Lara version)
- Julia (Laura version)
- Julia (Leanne version)
- Julia (Leonie version)
- Julia (Lida version)
- Julia (Lieke version)
- Julia (Linda version)
- Julia (Lindsey version)
- Julia (Lisa version)
- Julia (Lisette version)
- Julia (Lizanne version)
- Julia (Lotte version)
- Julia (Maartje version)
- Julia (Madelief version)
- Julia (Maike version)
- Julia (Mandy version)
- Julia (Manon version)
- Julia (Margot version)
- Julia (Maria version)
- Julia (Marieke version)
- Julia (Mariella version)
- Julia (Marije version)
- Julia (Mariska version)
- Julia (Marit version)
- Julia (Marjolein version)
- Julia (Marleen version)
- Julia (Marloes version)
- Julia (Martine version)
- Julia (Maud version)
- Julia (Meike version)
- Julia (Melanie version)
- Julia (Melissa version)
- Julia (Merel version)
- Julia (Michelle version)
- Julia (Mila version)
- Julia (Milou version)
- Julia (Miranda version)
- Julia (Mirjam version)
- Julia (Monique version)
- Julia (Myrthe version)
- Julia (Naomi version)
- Julia (Natalie version)
- Julia (Nicky version)
- Julia (Nicole version)
- Julia (Nienke version)
- Julia (Noa version)
- Julia (Noortje version)
- Julia (Patricia version)
- Julia (Paulien version)
- Julia (Petra version)
- Julia (Rebecca version)
- Julia (Renske version)
- Julia (Rianne version)
- Julia (Robin version)
- Julia (Romy version)
- Julia (Roos version)
- Julia (Rosalie version)
- Julia (Saar version)
- Julia (Sabine version)
- Julia (Samantha version)
- Julia (Sandra version)
- Julia (Sanne version)
- Julia (Sara version)
- Julia (Saskia version)
- Julia (Sharon version)
- Julia (Simone version)
- Julia (Sophie version)
- Julia (Stephanie version)
- Julia (Sterre version)
- Julia (Suzanne version)
- Julia (Tamara version)
- Julia (Tess version)
- Julia (Trijntje version)
- Julia (Veerle version)
- Julia (Vera version)
- Julia (Wendy version)
- Julia (Willemijn version)
- Julia (Yfke version)
- Julia (Yvonne version)
- Julia (Zoe version)

== See also ==
- List of Dutch Top 40 number-one singles of 2013
