= Veerman =

Veerman is a Dutch occupational surname meaning "ferryman". Variants are Veermann and Veermans. Notable people with the surname include:

- Cees Veerman (born 1949), Dutch politician
- Cees Veerman (musician) (1943–2014), Dutch singer and guitarist, member of The Cats
- Cornelis Veerman (1908–1994), Dutch Roman Catholic bishop in Brazil
- Henk Veerman (born 1991), Dutch footballer
- Joey Veerman (born 1998), Dutch footballer
- Pepijn Veerman (born 1992), Dutch footballer
- Piet Veerman (born 1943), Dutch singer and guitarist, member of The Cats

== See also ==
- Ernest Veermann (1905–1977) né Ernst Wiermann, Estonian-Canadian Romanov impostor
