= One Way Wind (song) =

Single by The Cats

from the album Aglow
- B-side: "Country Woman"
- Released: July 1971
- Genre: Pop; Soft rock
- Length: 3:39
- Label: Columbia Records
- Songwriter: Arnold Mühren

The Cats singles chronology
"Don't Waste Your Time" (1971)	"One Way Wind" (1971)	"Let's Dance" (1972)

"One Way Wind" is a 1971 hit song written by Dutch musician Arnold Mühren and recorded by his band The Cats.

== Composition ==
The 3-minute-39-second song is in the key of E major with a tempo of 110 beats per minute.

== Chart performance ==
The song was released in July 1971, and became an international hit, charting at number 3 in the Dutch Top 40, number 4 on Ultratop, number 4 in Germany, and number 1 in Switzerland. It is listed on #7 on the Dutch public broadcasting organization's top 200 of the 1970s. On the New Zealand Listener charts it reached number 12.

== Cover versions in multiple languages ==
- Karel Gott – Se mnou vítr rád si brouká (Czech)
- Dana Winner – Westenwind (Dutch)
- Die Flippers – Sommerwind (German)
