= List of Dutch Top 40 number-one singles of 2013 =

This is a list of the Dutch Top 40 number-one singles of 2013. The Dutch Top 40 is a chart that ranks the best-performing singles of the Netherlands. It is published every week by radio station Radio 538.

== Chart history ==
Issue Date	Song	Artist(s)	Reference(s)
January 5	"Scream & Shout"	will.i.am featuring Britney Spears	
January 12	"Scream & Shout"	will.i.am featuring Britney Spears	
January 19	"Scream & Shout"	will.i.am featuring Britney Spears	
January 26	"Scream & Shout"	will.i.am featuring Britney Spears	
February 2	"Scream & Shout"	will.i.am featuring Britney Spears	
February 9	"Scream & Shout"	will.i.am featuring Britney Spears	
February 16	"Scream & Shout"	will.i.am featuring Britney Spears	
February 23	"Just Give Me a Reason"	Pink featuring Nate Ruess	
March 2	"Just Give Me a Reason"	Pink featuring Nate Ruess	
March 9	"Just Give Me a Reason"	Pink featuring Nate Ruess	
March 16	"Thrift Shop"	Macklemore & Ryan Lewis featuring Wanz	
March 23	"Julia"	Nick & Simon	
March 30	"Julia"	Nick & Simon	
April 6	"Sonnentanz"	Klangkarussell	
April 13	"Sonnentanz"	Klangkarussell	
April 20	"Blurred Lines"	Robin Thicke featuring T.I. & Pharrell Williams	
April 27	"Blurred Lines"	Robin Thicke featuring T.I. & Pharrell Williams	
May 4	"Blurred Lines"	Robin Thicke featuring T.I. & Pharrell Williams	
May 11	"Blurred Lines"	Robin Thicke featuring T.I. & Pharrell Williams	
May 18	"Blurred Lines"	Robin Thicke featuring T.I. & Pharrell Williams	
May 25	"Blurred Lines"	Robin Thicke featuring T.I. & Pharrell Williams	
June 1	"Blurred Lines"	Robin Thicke featuring T.I. & Pharrell Williams	
June 8	"Blurred Lines"	Robin Thicke featuring T.I. & Pharrell Williams	
June 15	"Blurred Lines"	Robin Thicke featuring T.I. & Pharrell Williams	
June 22	"Blurred Lines"	Robin Thicke featuring T.I. & Pharrell Williams	
June 29	"Blurred Lines"	Robin Thicke featuring T.I. & Pharrell Williams	
July 6	"Wake Me Up!"	Avicii	
July 13	"Wake Me Up!"	Avicii	
July 20	"Wake Me Up!"	Avicii	
July 27	"Wake Me Up!"	Avicii	
August 3	"Wake Me Up!"	Avicii	
August 10	"Wake Me Up!"	Avicii	
August 17	"Wake Me Up!"	Avicii	
August 24	"Wake Me Up!"	Avicii	
August 31	"Wake Me Up!"	Avicii	
September 7	"Wake Me Up!"	Avicii	
September 14	"Wake Me Up!"	Avicii	
September 21	"Take Your Time Girl"	Niels Geusebroek	
September 28	"Take Your Time Girl"	Niels Geusebroek	
October 5	"Tsunami"	DVBBS & Borgeous	
October 12	"Tsunami"	DVBBS & Borgeous	
October 19	"Happy"	Pharrell Williams	
October 26	"Happy"	Pharrell Williams	
November 2	"Tsunami"	DVBBS & Borgeous	
November 9	"Tsunami"	DVBBS & Borgeous	
November 16	"Hey Brother"	Avicii	
November 23	"Hey Brother"	Avicii	
November 30	"Hey Brother"	Avicii	
December 7	"Hey Brother"	Avicii	
December 14	"Happy"	Pharrell Williams	
December 21	"Happy"	Pharrell Williams	
December 28	"Timber"	Pitbull featuring Kesha	

== Number-one artists ==
Position	Artist	Weeks #1
1	Pharrell Williams	15
1	Avicii	15
2	Robin Thicke	11
2	T.I.	11
3	will.i.am	7
3	Britney Spears	7
4	DVBBS	4
4	Borgeous	4
5	Pink	3
5	Nate Ruess	3
6	Niels Geusebroek	2
6	Nick & Simon	2
6	Klangkarussell	2
7	Pitbull	1
7	Ke$ha	1
7	Macklemore	1
7	Ryan Lewis	1
7	Wanz	1

== See also ==
- 2013 in music
- List of number-one singles in the Dutch Top 40
