= Piet Veerman =

Dutch pop musician (born 1943)

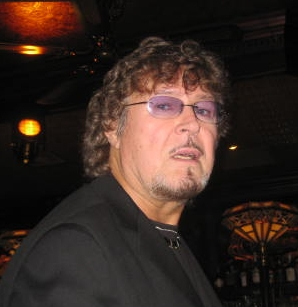
- Veerman in 2008

Background information
- Also known as: De Koster
- Born: Piet J.A. Veerman; 1 March 1943 (age 83); Volendam, Netherlands
- Genres: rock; pop; (palingsound)
- Occupation: Singer
- Instruments: Guitar; vocals
- Years active: Since early sixties
- Labels: EMI; Columbia
- Formerly of: The Cats
- Website: pietveerman.nl

Piet Veerman (born 1 March 1943) is a Dutch pop musician. From 1964 to 1985 he was a guitarist and singer for The Cats, and since 1968 the lead singer for all the singles of this band. He released a first solo album in 1975 but started his solo career definitely in 1987 after The Cats broke up for the last time. During his career, Veerman received more than thirty gold records.

== Biography ==
Veerman was born in the fishing village of Volendam, Netherlands. His father played many instruments, like recorder, harmonica, guitar, banjo and sitar, and taught his son to play music. His mother was a painter and taught her son to paint. At an age of twelve the young Piet obtained his first guitar. At that time he didn't know if he wanted to choose art or music.

Together with his cousin Jaap Schilder, they performed as the Everly Kosters. This name was formed by De Koster, the nickname of their family, with a reference to The Everly Brothers who were immensely popular during their youth. However, the greatest influence for them came from The Hi-Lo's.

A dance teacher and promoter of local music groups at that time was Jan Buijs, nickname Spruit, not to be confused with the later artist manager of The Cats with the same name, nicknamed Tuf. Due to Spruit the duo was introduced to Arnold Mühren and Cees Veerman, who were members of his band Electric Johnny & The Skyriders.

=== The Cats ===
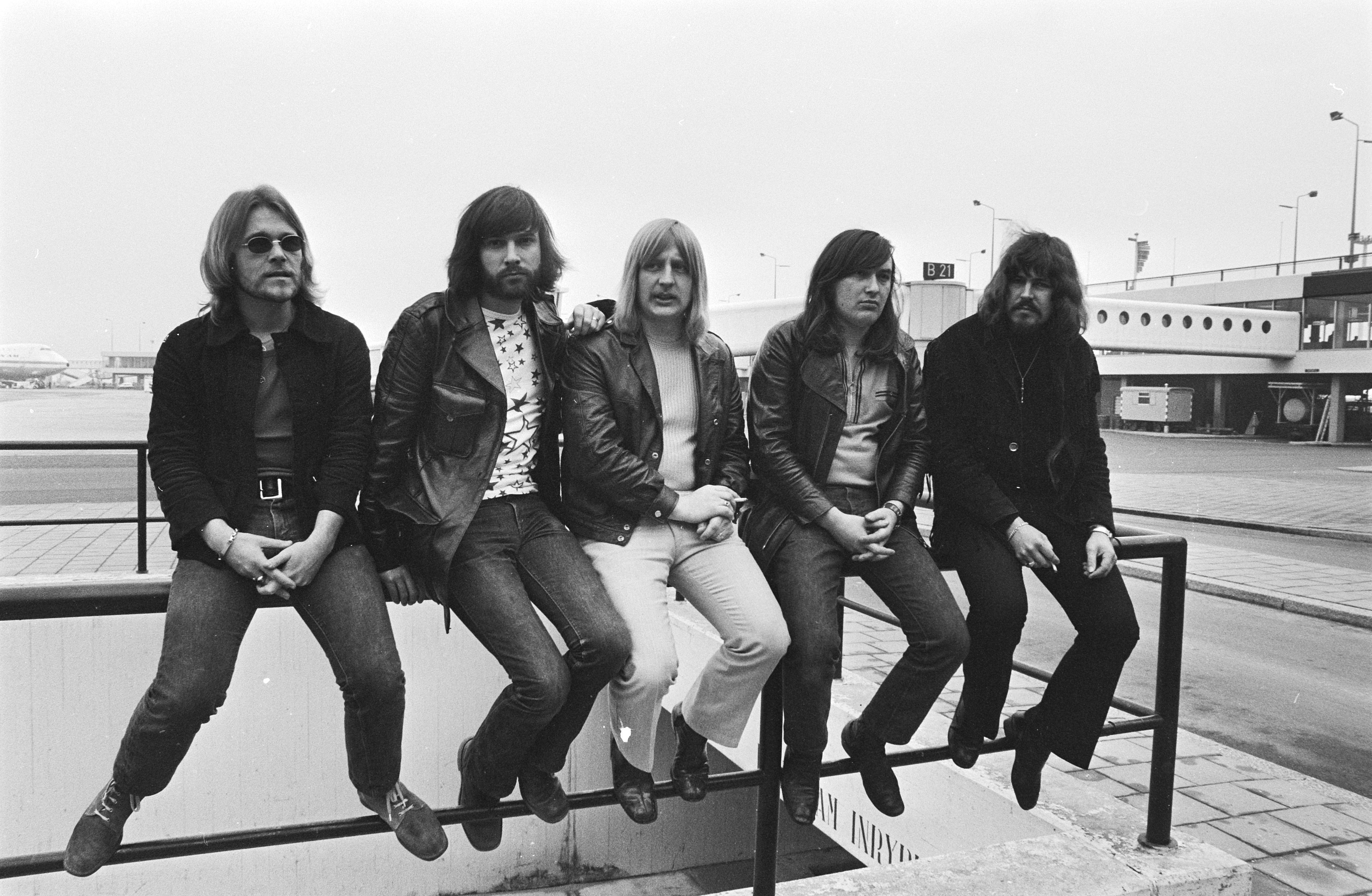
The Cats on Schiphol before their departure to Indonesia, 1971

Shortly afterwards they formed The Mystic Four, which was renamed to The Blue Cats and subsequently to The Cats. From the release of the single "Times Were When" (1968), Veerman became the lead singer for basically all the singles of The Cats. Up to 1974 it was the most popular Dutch band in the country. They became popular in Belgium, Germany, Indonesia and Suriname as well. In 1974 the band broke up for the first time.

In 1975, The Cats reunited but record company EMI gave them the opportunity to record their own solo albums. Veerman recorded an album and a single, both called Rollin' On A River. The single landed on number 9 of the Dutch Top 40.

The Cats were also successful again, although not as big as several years earlier. Veerman continued to be their lead singer until the band broke up for the second time in 1980. He again released a solo album, called Back To You, and the single "Living To Love You". In 1981 he wrote the guitar intro of a song called "Mooi Volendam" of the band Canyon, which became a classic song in the course of years.

In 1983 The Cats reunited for the third time, until they split definitely in 1985.

=== Solo career ===
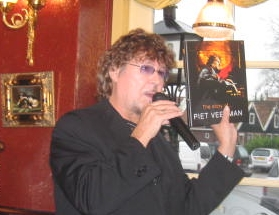
Veerman at the presentation of his biography, 2008

Veerman took up a solo career and in 1987 he released his single "Sailin' Home", a cover of Neda Ukraden's 1985 song "Zora je". The single became a major success, charting number 1 in the Netherlands and Belgium and number 4 in Austria. In the Netherlands it was the biggest selling single of the year of 1987.

The same year he achieved a number 7 hit with "Walking Together" and in the following years ten more singles reached the Dutch charts. He continued releasing singles until 1993. More than ten albums reached the charts and several received a gold status.

Further on in his career he experimented with reggae and soul music, including some covers of Willy DeVille such as his single "Heaven Stood Still". His successes were not as great as at the beginning of his solo career though. Later he recorded singles and albums that were partly in Spanish and that were influenced by Latin pop and Tex Mex.

He also co-operated with other musicians from Volendam. In 1993 he recorded a duet with Anny Schilder, the former vocalist of BZN. Together with Jan Smit and George Baker in 2002 he recorded an album in German, called Die Goldenen Stimmen (The Golden Voices). He also played as a guest musician on albums, such as in 2006 on A Wink At The Moon of guitarist and singer-songwriter Specs Hildebrand. In 2014 he recorded the single "Lovin' Arms" with vocalist Mell (full name; Mellanie Jonk), granddaughter and contestant on Voice of Holland. He continued to support Mell who has since become the front lady of Mell & Vintage Future; for health reasons he has limited performing to special occasions.

=== Awards ===
In his career, Veerman received more than thirty gold records. He is an honorary citizen of California (1974), Aruba (2004) and Edam-Volendam (2004). In 2006 he and the other former members of The Cats were decorated members of the Order of Orange-Nassau.
