= The Love in Your Eyes =

The Love in Your Eyes may refer to:

- The Love in Your Eyes (album), by the Cats, or the title song, 1974
- "The Love in Your Eyes" (Dan Hartman song), 1994
- "The Love in Your Eyes" (Eddie Money song), 1988
- The Love in Your Eyes (TV series), a South Korean series; see 2022 KBS Drama Awards

== See also ==
- "Amor en Tus Ojos" (lit. 'Love in Your Eyes'), a 1996 song by Soraya
