= The Cats (Dutch band) =

Dutch rock band (1964–1985)

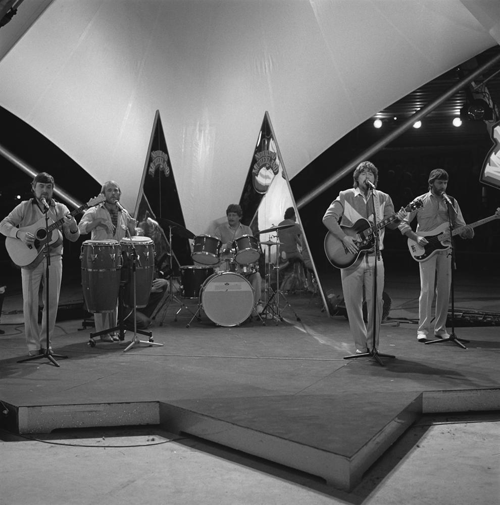
- The Cats performing on Nederland Muziekland on 1 April 1983

Background information
- Also known as: The Mystic Four; The Blue Cats
- Origin: Volendam, the Netherlands
- Genre: Rock (palingsound)
- Years active: 1964–1985
- Label: EMI
- Past members: Arnold Mühren; Jaap Schilder; Cees Veerman; Piet Veerman; Theo Klouwer; Piet Keizer

The Cats were a Dutch rock band formed in Volendam in 1964.

They were active (with a few interruptions) from 1964 until 1985 and had their most successful period from 1968 until 1975.

Of the many hits the band had at home and abroad, the biggest one is "One Way Wind", which was released in 38 countries and a top ten number in several of them, of which it was a number one in Switzerland. In Germany it sold more than a million copies. The song has been covered by some 150 other artists. The number was written by Arnold Mühren, bass-player and chief composer.

Further band members were Cees Veerman (vocals/guitar/percussion) and Piet Veerman (vocals/guitar), Theo Klouwer (drums), and Jaap Schilder (guitar) and Piet Keizer (guitar; for three years).

== Career ==
=== 1960s ===
The band began life as two separate duos: Cees Veerman (6 October 1943 - 15 March 2014) and Arnold Mühren (born 28 January 1944) who started in a skiffle band; and cousins Piet Veerman (born 1 March 1943) and Jaap Schilder (born 9 January 1943) who modelled themselves after the Everly Brothers. The duos merged and became The Mystic Four, with Cees and Piet Veerman on vocals and guitar, Schilder on guitar (and piano), and Mühren on bass. By 1965 they changed their name to The Blue Cats, a reference to the colour of their suits and Cees' nickname, Poes (Dutch for 'cat'). Dropping the 'Blue' from their name in 1966 they recruited drummer Theo Klouwer (30 June 1947 – 8 February 2001).

The Cats borrowed money from Jan Buys, who was later to become their manager, and recorded their first singles that immediately entered the charts. Singing in English thanks to a songwriting duo from England, the group sounded British. Cees initially performed the majority of the lead vocals but that was to change by 1968 when the band recorded a cover version of Studio Six's "Times Were When"; Piet felt that this song suited his voice better and Cees agreed. Arnold's lyrics and Piet's sad voice appeared to be a match made in heaven, spawning five Top 10 hits in the next two years including "Lea" (dedicated to a faithful fan who died in a car accident), "Why?", "Scarlet Ribbons" and "Marian".

=== 1970s ===
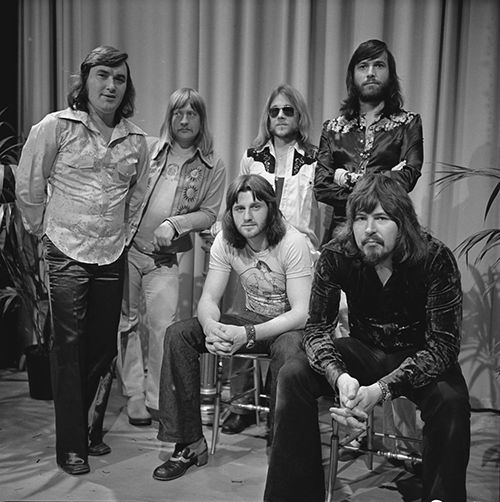
The Cats, TopPop television program, 1974.

Their international popularity began to grow. By spring 1970 the Cats toured Suriname and the Netherlands Antilles and played one show on 4 April 1970 in Guyana. A tour of Indonesia followed early 1971.

"Don't Waste Your Time" broke a string of Top 10 chart dominations, but the next single, "One Way Wind", became The Cats' biggest ever hit. In Germany it reached Number One chart position and in 1972 the band responded by releasing Katzenspiele (Cat's Play), featuring their hits rerecorded in German.

By now, the band were very popular and had a busy touring schedule, which began to take its toll Cees contracted voice problems. Crew member Piet Keizer replaced him temporarily. In 1974 the Cats released The Love in Your Eyes, an album recorded at the Larrabee Sound Studios in Los Angeles by session musicians, with the Cats members only laying down vocals. Cees Veerman said about those sessions, "'Be My Day' topped the charts, which was a great thing, but the rest of that pre-baked stuff should've been chucked into the ocean near Malibu".

Their Malibu sojourn did not stop The Cats from using the same team of musicians for the follow-up record Hard To Be Friends, although this time the vocals were recorded at home. "Come Sunday" charted late 1974, shortly after Cees had left the band to take another break. The title track, on which Jaap Schilder sang falsetto ad-libs, followed early 1975. As the band didn't tour during this period, the two Veermans and Schilder had time to release solo-albums that were a departure from the Cats-sound. By public demand The Cats returned to the stage for a number of dates to promote their 1975 Christnas-album. The hits continued but didn't capture former glories and not everyone was always available for TV-shows. When The Cats were booked to appear on chart-show Rock Planet in 1978 to playback "She Was Too Young" it was almost a solo-performance by Cees. By the end of 1979 The Cats decided to disband. A farewell-single (a reissue of the 1972 track "End of the Show") charted as late as April 1980.

=== Solo careers ===
In 1976, Cees Veerman released a solo album called "Another Side of Me", which spawned the single "Sailor, Sail On (Dreamer, Dream On)".

After a brief Cats-reunion Piet Veerman had a solo-hit in 1987 with "Sailing Home". Subsequent singles did reasonably well and he kept touring with a set of solo material and Cats' classics, often using backing tapes. In 1995, Piet guested on a bilingual duet version of "One Way Wind" with Flemish singer Dana Winner titled "Westenwind". Piet sang in English and Winner sang in Dutch.

=== 2000s ===
On 23 March 2006, The Cats were made Members of the Order of Orange-Nassau. The same year the group had a reunion to record a single for inclusion on a best of album. It went gold.

Cees Veerman performed with the Cats Aglow Band who both supported and backed Willy DeVille at the latter's Amsterdam Carré Theatre show on 7 July 2008. He moved to Indonesia where he died at the age of 70 on 15 March 2014.

== Discography ==
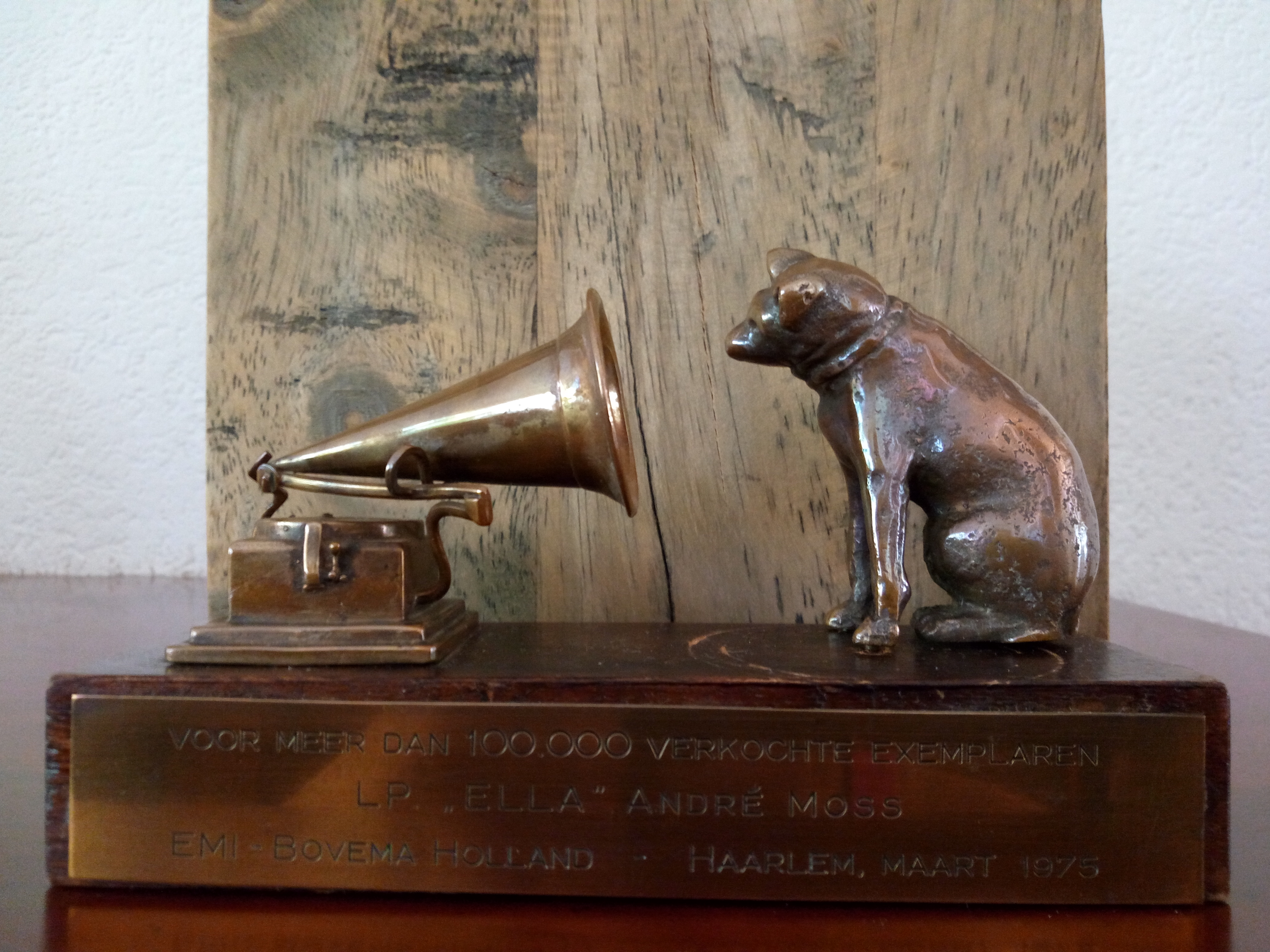
Golden Dog (His Master's Voice) for one million sales of the single One Way Wind in Germany

=== Albums ===
Year	Album	Peak	Certification (NED)
1967	Cats as Cats Can		
1968	Cats		Gold
1969	Colour Us Gold	1	Gold
1970	Take Me with You	1	Gold
1971	Cats Aglow	3	Gold
1972	Signed by The Cats	3	Gold
1973	Home	8	Gold
1974	The Love in Your Eyes	1	Gold
1975	Hard to Be Friends	40	
1975	We Wish You a Merry Christmas	22	
1976	Homerun	19	
1978	Like the Old Days		Platinum
1983	Third Life	8	Gold
1985	Flyin' High	24	
1994	Shine On	38	
Live albums
1984	Live	33	
Compilation albums with new tracks included
1983	Het beste van The Cats		Includes 1 new track
1994	The Rest of...		Compilation and new tracks
2006	Those Were the Days	2	Gold, includes 2 new tracks
2014	Complete	30	
2014	Collected	2	
Compilation albums
1969?	Songs We Sang		
1970	Portrait	4	Gold
1970	Where Have I Been Wrong		
1971	The Cats		
1972	Times Were When	12	Gold
1972	One Way Wind		
1972	Vaya con Dios		
1973	The best of The Cats		
1974	10 Jaar	2	Gold
1974	Story presenteert The Cats op hun best	3	Gold
1977	Let's Go Together		
1979	20 Golden Hits	14	Platinum
1979	The End of the Show		
1983	The Story Of	10	Platinum
1983	Collection		
1984	Het complete hitalbum		
1985	De mooiste van The Cats		
1985	Girls Only		
1988	Greatest Hits Volume 1 & 2	30	
1992	Love Cats	14	
1994	Gold	22	
1998	The Very Best Of - Highlights	32	
2002	Greatest Hits	3	
2008	Hollandse sterrencollectie		
2008	The Cats 100	2	
2010	Alle 40 goed		
2011	Trying to Explain - Cats Only	19	
2012	Best of (3 CD set)		

=== Singles ===
Year	Title	Peak chart positions						
Year	Title	NED Dutch Top 40	NED Top 30/100	BEL (Fl)	GER	SWI	AUT	US (AC)
1965	"Juke-box"	-	-	-	-	-	-	-
1965	"Somewhere Over the Rainbow"	-	-	-	-	-	-	-
1965	"Ave Maria no morro"	-	-	-	-	-	-	-
1966	"What a Crazy Life"	14	16	-	-	-	-	-
1967	"Vive l'amour"	26	-	-	-	-	-	-
1967	"Sure He's a Cat"	12	8	-	-	-	-	-
1967	"What's the World Coming To"	27	-	-	-	-	-	-
1968	"Turn Around and Start Again"	14	14	-	-	-	-	-
1968	"Times Were When"	2	2	-	-	-	-	-
1968	"Lea"	1	1	6	-	-	-	-
1969	"Why"	1	1	8	-	-	-	-
1969	"Scarlet Ribbons"	3	2	18	-	-	-	-
1969	"Marian"	1	1	8	-	-	-	-
1970	"Magical Mystery Morning"	4	3	14	-	-	-	-
1970	"Where Have I Been Wrong"	1	1	9	-	-	-	-
1971	"Don't Waste Your Time"	11	9	-	-	-	-	-
1971	"One Way Wind"	3	3	4	4	1	-	-
1972	"Let's Dance"	2	2	2	3	2	12	-
1972	"Vaya con Dios"	3	3	2	-	-	-	-
1972	"There Has Been a Time"	3	3	16	34	-	-	-
1972	"Du bist mein Zuhaus"	-	-	-	36	-	-	-
1973	"Maribaja"	6	7	-	-	-	-	-
1973	"Rock 'n' Roll (I Gave You the Best Years of My Life)"	3	3	19	48	-	-	-
1974	"Be my Day"	1	1	1	4	-	16	18
1974	"Come Sunday"	6	5	26	46	-	-	-
1975	"Hard to Be Friends"	15	13	-	-	-	-	-
1975	"Like a Spanish Song"	9	10	15	-	-	-	-
1975	"Silent Night"	18	21	-	-	-	-	-
1976	"We Should Be Together"	16	13	-	-	-	-	-
1976	"Romance"	25	Tip	-	-	-	-	-
1977	"Save the Last Dance for Me"	6	6	11	48	-	-	-
1977	"Cindy"	18	21	-	-	-	-	-
1977	"Lucky Star"	Tip	Tip	-	-	-	-	-
1978	"She Was Too Young"	24	27	21	-	-	-	-
1980	"The End of the Show"	5	7	20	-	-	-	-
1982	"La diligence"	11	5	18	-	-	-	-
1983	"Stay in My Life"	20	17	-	-	-	-	-
1983	"Love Is a Golden Ring"	15	11	19	-	-	-	-
1984	"Lovers Don't Talk"	37	35	-	-	-	-	-
1984	"Second Pair of Eyes"	-	Tip	-	-	-	-	-
1984	"A Love like Yours"	-	Tip	-	-	-	-	-
1985	"She's So in Love"	31	27	-	-	-	-	-
1985	"Hooray for Michael"	Tip	Tip	-	-	-	-	-
1994	"Poppy"	-	-	-	-	-	-	-
2006	"The Best Years of My Life"	Tip	10	-	-	-	-	-
2006	"Those Were the Days"	-	63	-	-	-	-	-
