= 3JS =

Dutch pop band

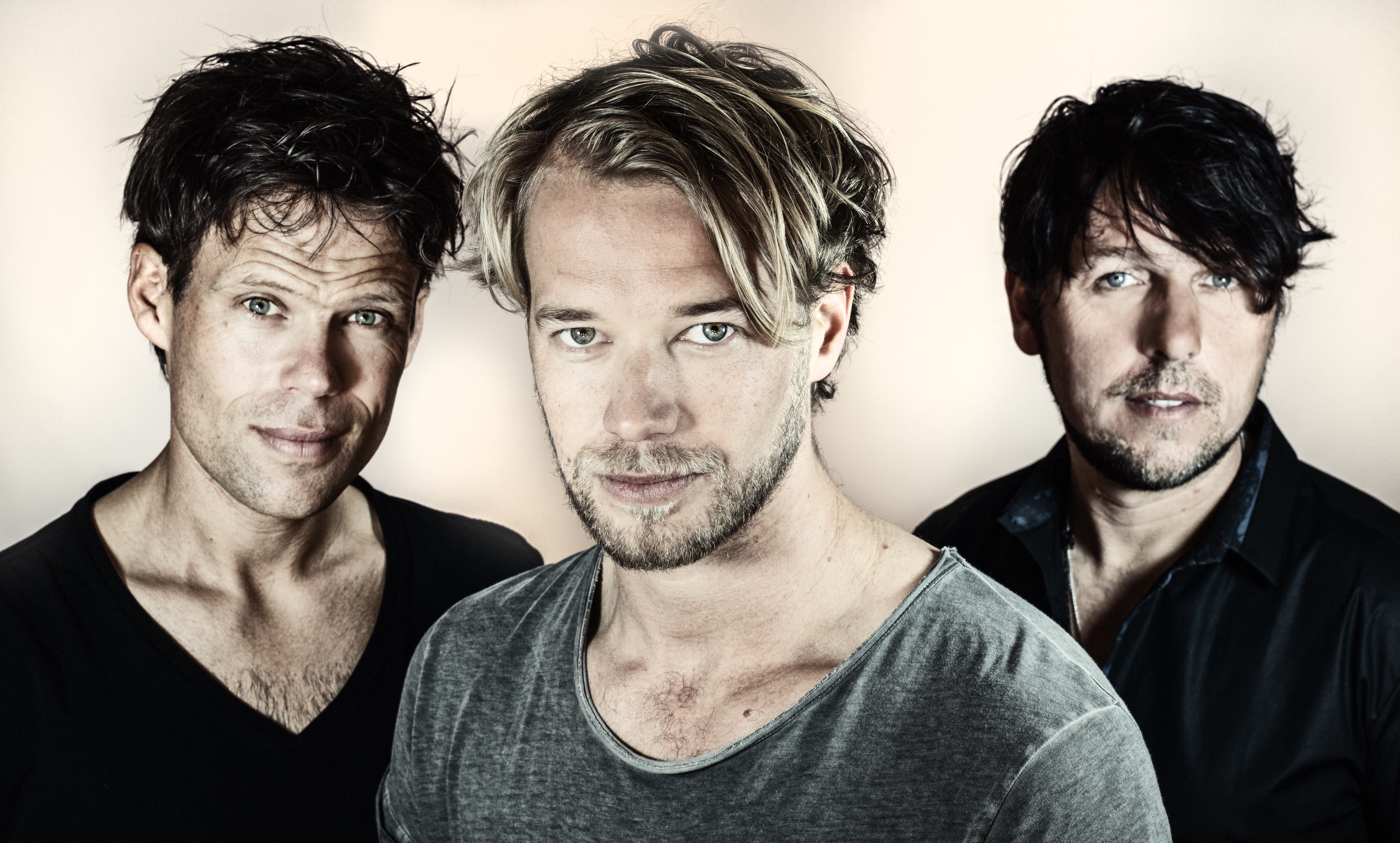
- 3JS in 2016

Background information
- Origin: Volendam, Netherlands
- Genres: Pop music
- Years active: 2002–present
- Labels: Volendam Music; Artist & Company
- Members: Jan Dulles (2002–present); Jaap Kwakman (2002–present); Robin Küller (2019–present)
- Past members: Jaap de Witte (2002–2013); Jan de Witte (2013–2019)
- Website: 3js.nl

3JS (Dutch pronunciation: [driˈjeːs]; lit. 'three Js') is a Dutch band from Volendam, currently consisting of Jan Dulles, Jaap Kwakman and Robin Küller. The band rose to fame in 2007 after the success of their debut album Watermensen, which they had recorded with their friends Jan Smit and Nick & Simon. In 2011, the band represented the Netherlands in the Eurovision Song Contest 2011 with the song "Never Alone".

== History ==
The name "3JS" is based on the first names of the band's original members: Jan Dulles, Jaap Kwakman and Jaap de Witte. The three original members have known each other since 1996. From 2002 they performed locally under their current name, 3JS.

=== 2007–2008: Watermensen ===
On 8 June 2007, the band released its first studio album, Watermensen (English: Water people). The album was recorded entirely in-house. All compositions are self made and the production took them for its own account. The album brought the modest hits "Kom", "Net alsof", "Een met de bomen", "Watermensen" and "Wiegelied". On 6 July 2007, the album reached number six in the Mega Album Top 100 and lasted 87 weeks in the top 100.

In the summer of 2007, a television programme under the name 3JS komen eraan about the band aired on the local channel, RTV Noord-Holland for eight weeks. The programme starred Jan Smit, with the band members regular guests on the programme.

On 21 January 2008, the band along with Alain Clark, Wouter Hamel, Nick & Simon and Thomas Berge were given an original Rembrandt. This prize is awarded by Stichting Nederlandse Muziek, for songs that are distinguished by lyrics and original compositions. A day later they won the 2007 Zilveren Harp. Both awards were won for their debut album Watermensen.

=== 2008–2010: Kamers van m'n hart and Dromers en dwazen ===
In October 2008, the group released their second album, Kamers van m'n hart (English: Chambers of my heart). The first single, "Hou van mij", was a top 10 hit, which reached number four in the Single Top 100. The album was as well received as its predecessor, with the album reaching number 4 in its first week on the Mega Album Top 100, and lasting forty weeks in the charts.

The third album by 3JS, entitled Dromers en dwazen (English: Dreamers and fools) was released in the spring of 2010. The group will release their first single from the album, "Loop met me over zee" (English: Walk with me by the sea), on 27 October 2010.

=== 2011: Eurovision Song Contest ===
During a radio show, the band announced that they were the Netherlands representative at the Eurovision Song Contest 2011 in Germany, with the Dutch broadcaster, Televisie Radio Omroep Stichting (TROS) also announcing the bands candidacy. With the band saying: "It's about the song again", after the Dutch poor results in recent years. The band produced five songs before the end 2010, which were performed at the national final (Nationaal Songfestival) in early 2011, during which the public and a professional jury voted for their favourite song.

At the Eurovision Song Contest, the band took last place in the semi-final with only 13 points in total.

=== 2012–present ===
In 2013, Jaap de Witte announced that he would leave the band. He was replaced by his son Jan de Witte. In 2019, the band announced that Jan de Witte would leave the band. He was replaced by Robin Johannes Küller.

== Timeline ==
Legend
Current member
Past member
Eurovision Song Contest 2011

== Discography ==
=== Albums ===
Title	Details	Peak chart positions	Certifications (sales thresholds)
Title	Details	NED	Certifications (sales thresholds)
Watermensen	Released: 2007; Label: Artist & Company	6	NED: Gold
Kamers van m'n hart	Released: 10 October 2008; Label: Artist & Company	4	NED: Gold
Dromers en dwazen	Released: 5 March 2010; Label: Artist & Company	3	
4 Elementen	Released: 3 February 2012; Label: Artist & Company	3	
7	Released: 13 November 2015; Label: Artist & Company	4	
Acoustic Christmas Volume 2	Released: 25 November 2016; Label: Artist & Company	10	
Nu	Released: 9 February 2018; Label: Warner Bros.	3	
De aard van het beest	Released: 15 May 2020; Label: Warner Bros.	1	
Mooie tijden	Released: 9 June 2023; Label: Warner	3	

=== Singles ===
Year	Song	Chart positions	Album
Year	Song	NED	Album
2007	"Kom"	24	Watermensen
2007	"Net alsof"	10	Watermensen
2007	"Eén met de bomen"	16	Watermensen
2007	"Eén met de bomen / De zomer voorbij"	49	Watermensen
2008	"Watermensen"	7	Watermensen
2008	"Wiegelied"	8	Watermensen
2008	"Hou van mij"	4	Kamers van m'n hart
2009	"Kamers van m'n hart"	28	Kamers van m'n hart
2009	"Bevlogen als vogels"	8	Kamers van m'n hart
2009	"Vandaag ben ik vrij / Alles overnieuw"	16	Kamers van m'n hart
2010	"Loop met me over zee"	7	Dromers en dwazen
2010	"Geloven in het leven"	9	Dromers en dwazen
2010	"Wat is dromen" (with Ellen ten Damme)	1	Dromers en dwazen
2011	"Je vecht nooit alleen"	1	Dromers en dwazen
2011	"De stroom"	12	Dromers en dwazen
2011	"Toen ik jou vergat"	37	Dromers en dwazen
2012	"De weg"	26	4 Elementen

Awards and achievements
Preceded by Sieneke with "Ik ben verliefd (Sha-la-lie)"	Netherlands in the Eurovision Song Contest; 2011	Succeeded by Joan Franka with "You and Me"
