= Sieneke =

Dutch singer (born 1992)

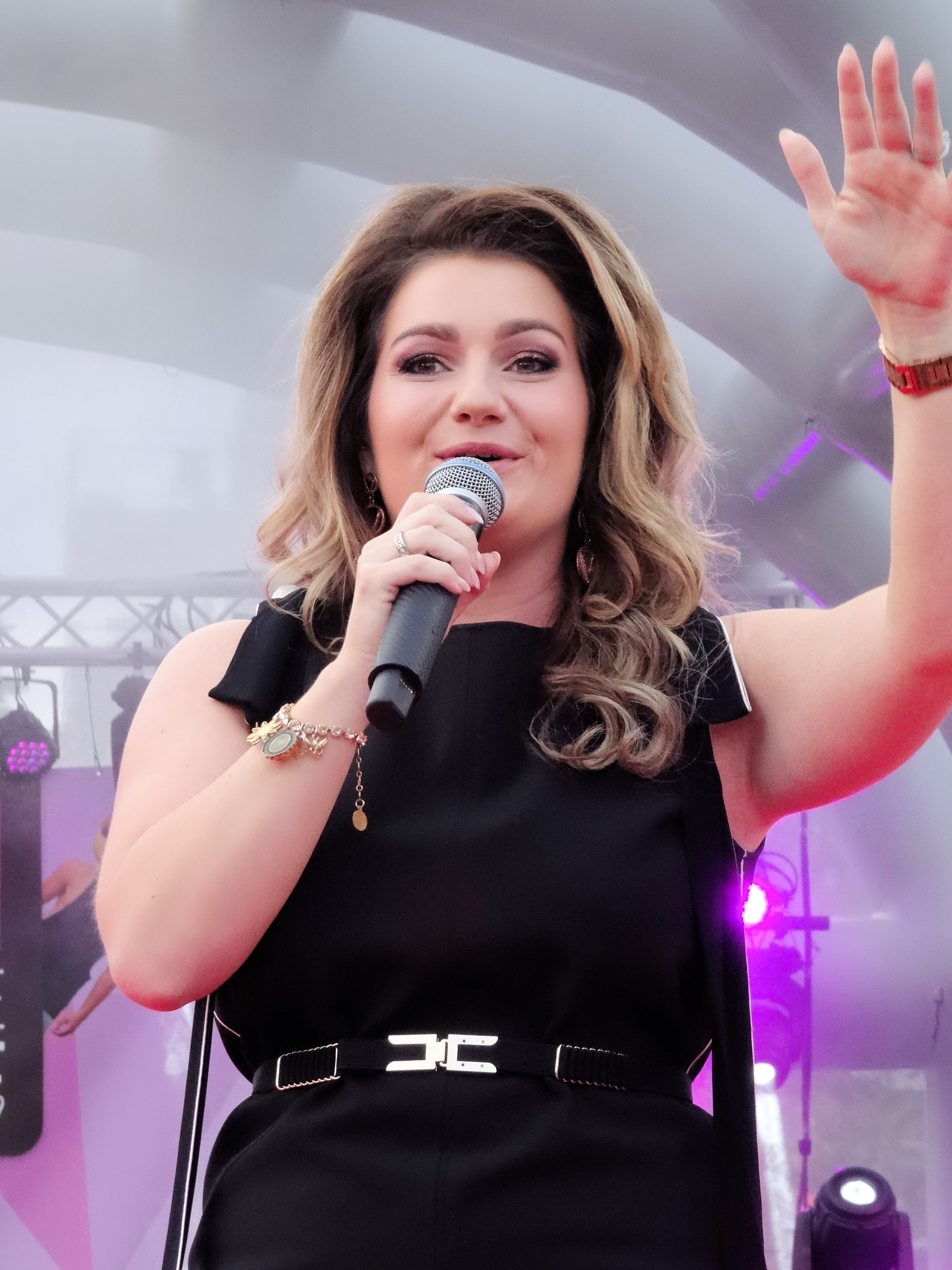
- Sieneke performing in 2019

Background information
- Born: Sieneke Clasina Gerdina Peeters; 1 April 1992 (age 34)
- Origin: Nijmegen, Netherlands
- Years active: 2007–present
- Label: Universal/Weber Records
- Spouse: Jan Baum (m. 2013; div. 2023)
- Website: www.sieneke.com

Sieneke Clasina Gerdina Peeters (born 1 April 1992) is a Dutch singer. She performed the Dutch entry at the Eurovision Song Contest 2010 semi-final.

Sieneke released an album with six covers of songs from the 1980s, called It's My Dream, in 2007. Besides her singing career, she is a trained hairstylist.

== Eurovision ==
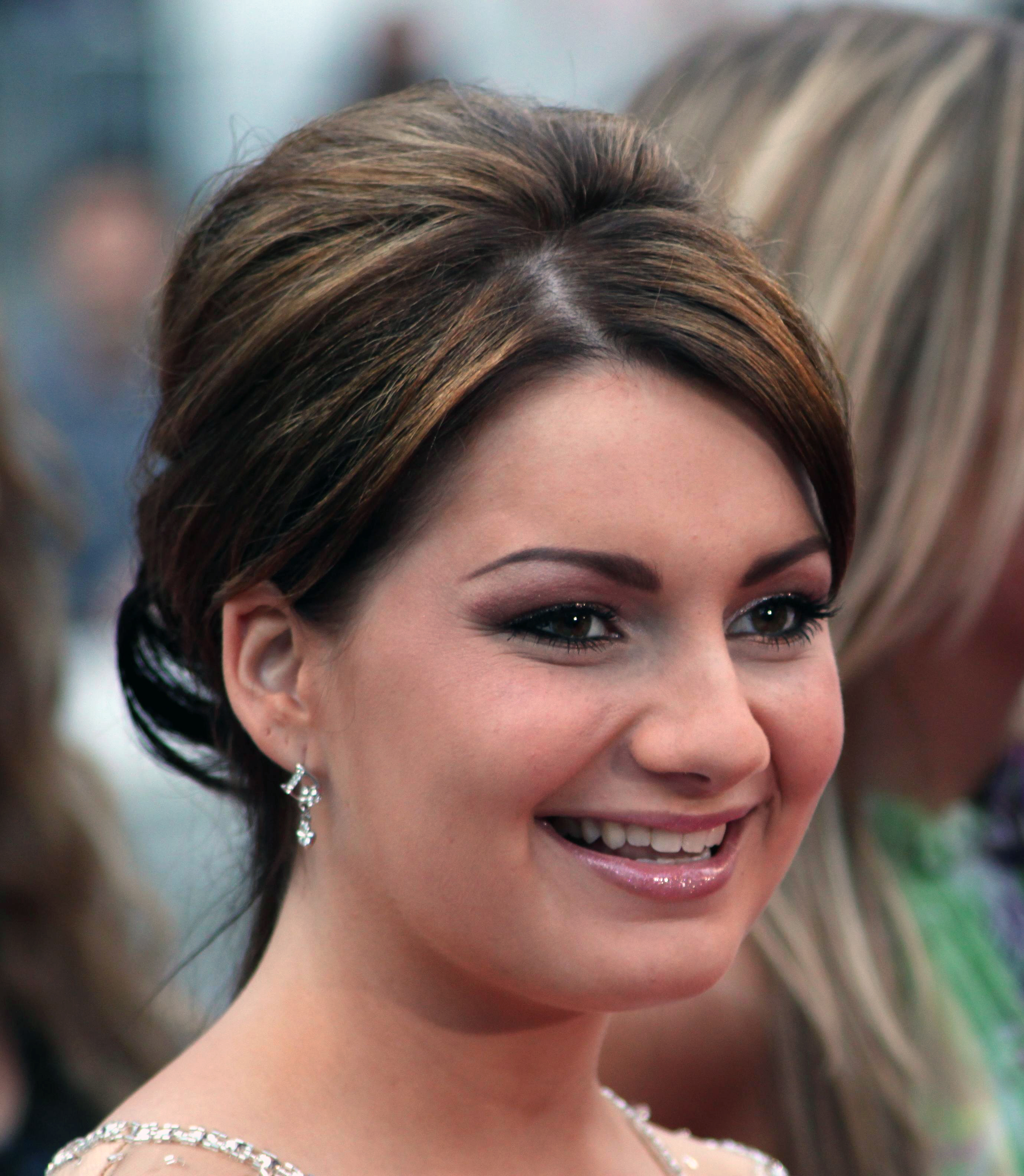
Sieneke in 2010

In 2010, Sieneke performed in the Dutch Nationaal Songfestival 2010 for the Eurovision Song Contest 2010, with all participants performing their own version of the song "Ik ben verliefd (Sha-la-lie)". The Dutch audience was surprised that there was no public vote for this year's Songfestival; instead, the winner was selected by 3 jury members. Sieneke won with 2 points, with Pierre Kartner reluctantly giving the deciding vote. Sieneke represented the Netherlands in the Eurovision Song Contest 2010 in Oslo, Norway, on 27 May, but did not qualify for the final.

Awards and achievements
Preceded by De Toppers with "Shine"	Netherlands in the Eurovision Song Contest; 2010	Succeeded by 3JS with "Never alone"
