= Simon Keizer =

Dutch singer-songwriter

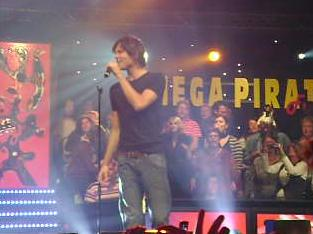
- Simon at Mega Piraten Festijn in Marum (10-10-08)

Background information
- Birth name: Simon Nicolaas Keizer
- Also known as: Simon Keizer
- Born: 16 May 1984 (age 40)
- Origin: Volendam, The Netherlands
- Genres: Palingsound, Nederpop
- Labels: Volendam Music
- Website: http://www.nickensimon.nl/

Simon Nicolaas (Simon) Keizer (Volendam, born 16 May 1984) is a Dutch singer-songwriter. Together with Nick Schilder, he formed a duo called Nick & Simon.

== Biography ==
Simon wrote his first song in 2000 called Still Searching, which he dedicated to his deceased father. Later, he recorded the song together with his classmate Nick Schilder. Since 2002 he has been making music with Nick and additionally writes songs with or for Jan Smit.

Monique Smit, sister of Jan Smit and also a singer, contacted Simon to participate on her first album, called Stel je voor (2008).

Simon was also Jan Smit's backing vocalist.

== Private life ==
Simon is the son of Klaas Keizer and Gerda Keizer-Keijzer. He has one elder sister, Carina. His father died in 1999 from cancer. Since September 2004 he has been in a relationship with Annemarie Hoek, with whom he lives. They became engaged in 2011. The two were married on 13 April 2012 in a private ceremony in Edam, the Netherlands. Simon is the great nephew of BZN singer Jan Keizer.
