= Nick Schilder =

Dutch singer-songwriter

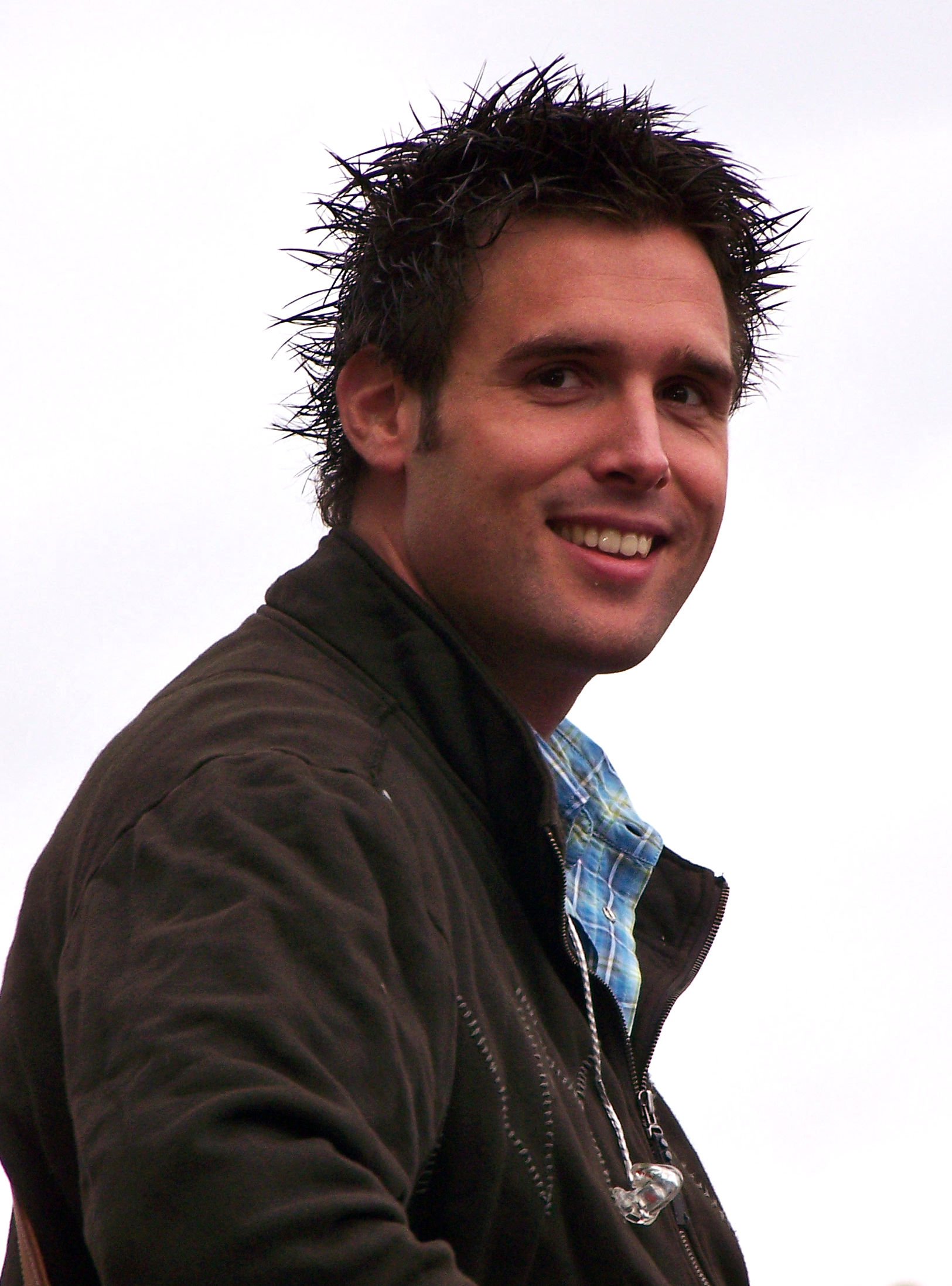
- Nick Schilder

Background information
- Also known as: Nick Schilder
- Born: Nicolaas Maria Schilder; 6 November 1983 (age 42)
- Origin: Volendam, Netherlands
- Genres: Palingsound, Nederpop
- Label: Volendam Music
- Formerly of: Nick & Simon
- Website: http://www.nickensimon.nl/

Nicolaas Maria "Nick" Schilder (born 6 November 1983) is a Dutch singer-songwriter. Together with Simon Keizer, he formed a duo called Nick & Simon.

== Career ==
Nick was born in Volendam, into a musical family which has produced other famous artists, such as Anny Schilder. At the age of 8, he started to learn how to play the guitar. He met Simon Keizer at school when they were 17 years old, at which point they began singing and writing songs together. Their first song was 'Do you know what I mean'.

On New Year's Eve 2001, Nick was injured during the Volendam New Year's fire disaster. He had to stay in the hospital for 23 days with lung problems. Afterward, to recover the doctors advised him to take singing lessons.

After this, he participated in the second season of the Dutch version of American Idol called Idols where he finished in eleventh place. Simon Keizer had been eliminated in the first round. After the show, Nick & Simon were contacted by their current record company: Volendam Music. Together, they have created such hits as "Rosanne", "Kijk Omhoog" and "Pak maar m'n hand", which is also the soundtrack of the film De Scheepsjongens van de Bontekoe (2008).

== Personal life ==
Nick is the son of Lida and Klaas Schilder. He has two younger brothers: Robert and Sam. Since September 2005 he has been in a relationship with Kirsten Hofstee. On 16 January 2011, Kirsten and Nick had a daughter named Nikki Brigitte Alida Schilder. On 26 August 2012, Nick and Kirsten's second child was born, a son named Julian.
