= Ferryman (disambiguation) =

A ferryman is the person who operates a boat or ship that transports passengers across a body of water.

Ferryman or The Ferryman may also refer to:

- The Ferryman, an episode of Captain Power and the Soldiers of the Future
- The Ferryman (2007 film), a 2007 New Zealand film
- The Ferryman (2016 film), a film by Jiajia Zhang
- The Ferryman (play), a 2017 play by Jez Butterworth
- "The Ferryman" (song), a folk ballad
- Ferryman, a mini-boss in the 2020 video game Ultrakill
- Ferryman gods, such as:
  - Aqen, Egyptian god of the dead
  - Charon, mythological Greek ferryman
