= Filip Naudts =

Belgian photographer and novelist(born 20th century

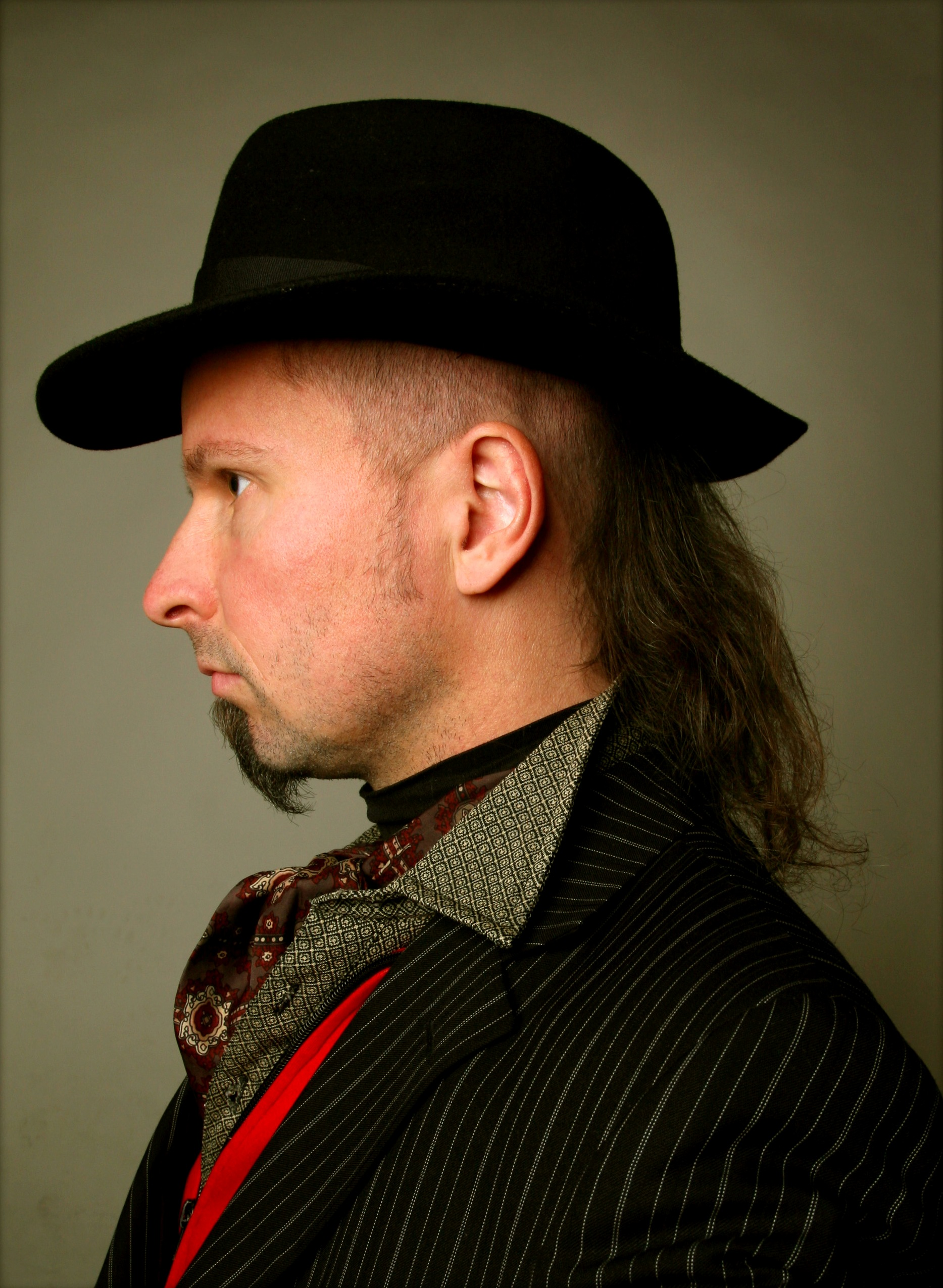
Naudts in 2007

Filip Naudts (born 20th century) is a photographer and photography reviewer based in Belgium.

== Biography ==
In 1992, Naudts began his career working for the Belgian national television and press. The following year, he was employed by the Fotomuseum Antwerp, where he remained until 2002. From 2002 to 2006, he became photo editor of the Dutch photo magazine Foto. After that, he started his career as a full-time freelance photographer. In 1993, he founded his own photo studio, Guarda La Fotografia, in Lochristi, where he developed his own poetic style, often referring to the portrait paintings of the Flemish primitives.

In 2000, the National Technical Museum in Prague held a solo exhibition of his work. This show resulted in the development and publication of his first book Auromatic.

His work gets published weekly in several magazines in Belgium like P-Magazine, Knack and Ché.

On the twentieth anniversary of his studio Guarda La Fotografia in 2013, an eponymous book was published, in which photographic portraits of Belgian celebrities, female nudity and humor play an important role.

In 2014 and 2017 in the city center of Ghent, Naudts founded Studio Guarda La Fotografia and Paparazzo, two tourist guesthouses inspired by photography, and wherein some of his photographs are shown.

Together with Dutch writer Julie O'Yang, Naudts released The Picture of Dorya Glenn, edited October 2017 by Stichting Kunstboek (Belgium) and Declare Press (Singapore). It is a dark surrealistic science-fiction photo novel in which the authors play the main characters: O'Yang in the shape of the extraterrestrial Dorya Glenn, and Naudts as himself. The photo shoots took place in Plomion, a commune in northern France.

In 2018 on the occasion of the 25th anniversary of Guarda La Fotografia, Stadsmuseum Lokeren brought a retrospective exhibition of Naudts's photographic work. Deputy Prime Minister of Belgium Alexander De Croo, among others, visited this exhibition.

Since 2019, Naudts has made cameo appearances in films, and television series, including Familie (B, 2019, episode 6335), Undercover (2019 TV series) (B, 2020, episode 14 'Trojan Horse Power'), Grond (B, 2021, episode 7 'Diwan Awards'), Net als in de film (NL, 2023), La Graine (F, 2023) and Chantal (B, 2024, episode 4 'Vreemde Vogel').

Naudts's work is represented by Galerie Van Campen & Rochtus in Antwerp and Knokke.

== Books by Naudts ==
- Auromatic: Emotional Portraits of Female Alter Egos. Brugge: Foto Art, 2000. ISBN 90-76001-25-1.
- Guarda La Fotografia. Oostkamp: Stichting Kunstboek, 2013. ISBN 978-90-5856-449-8
- Paparazzo. Oostkamp: Stichting Kunstboek, 2015. ISBN 978-90-5856-535-8
- The Picture of Dorya Glenn. Oostkamp: Stichting Kunstboek, 2017. With Julie O'yang. ISBN 978-9058565778. English and Dutch edition.

== Gallery (selection) ==
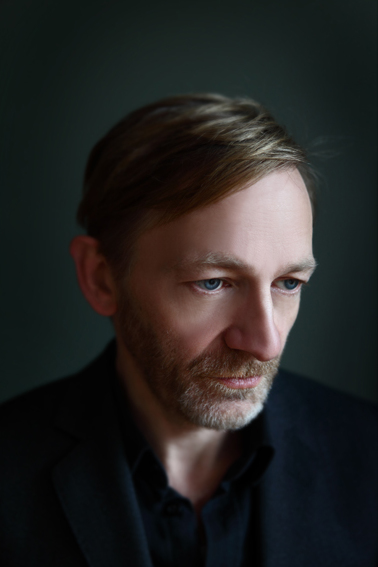
Michaël Borremans

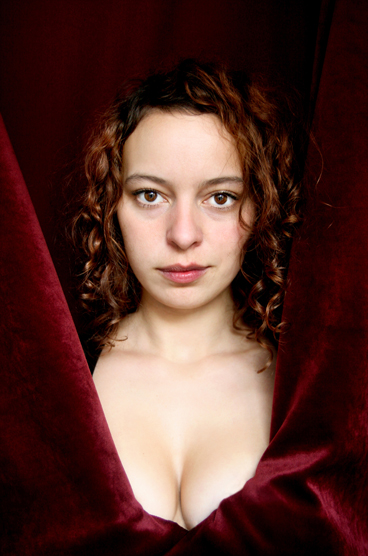
Marie Vinck

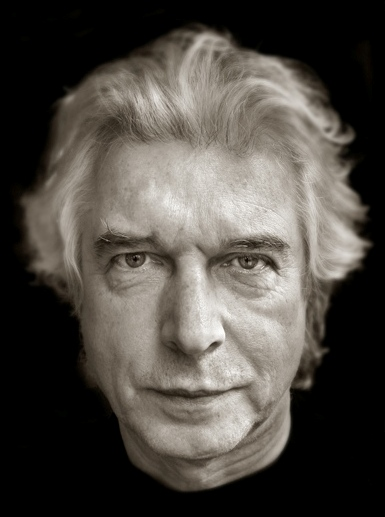
Boudewijn de Groot

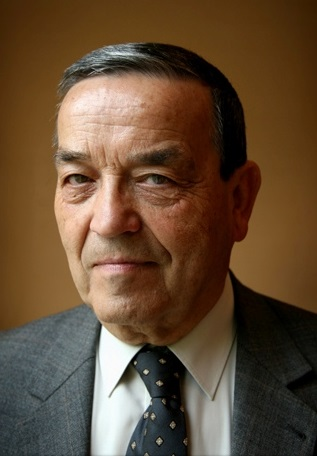
Louis Tobback

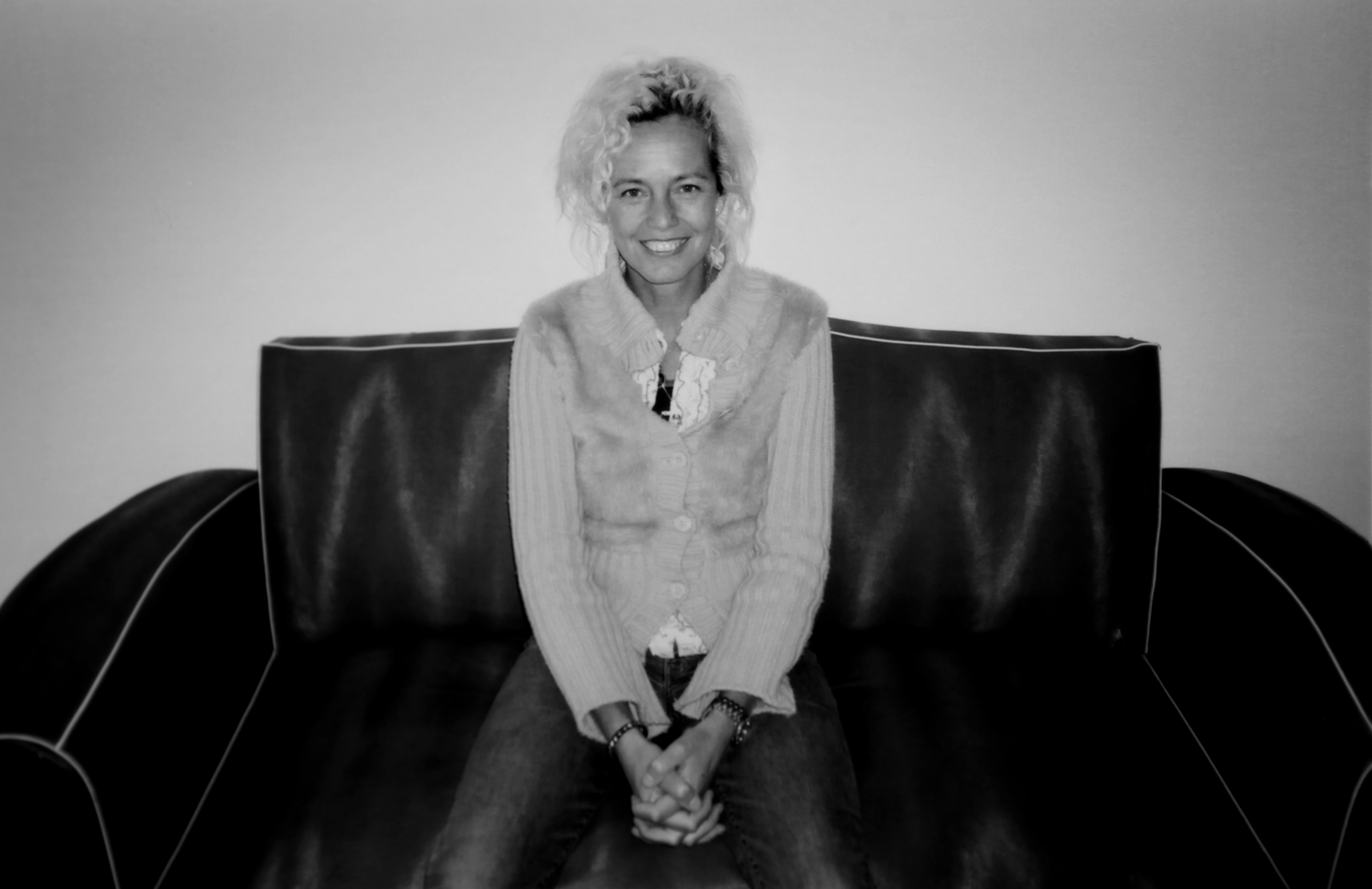
Ellen von Unwerth

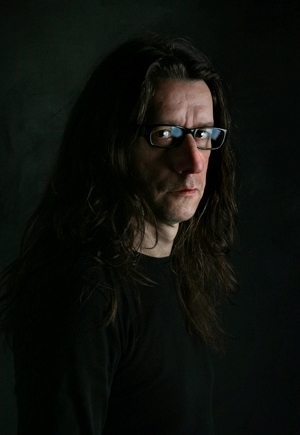
Herman Brusselmans

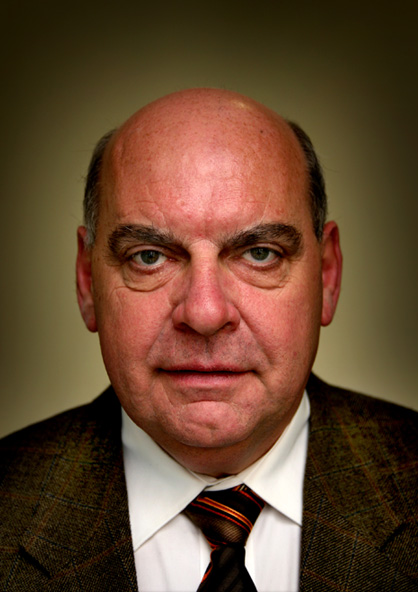
Daniël Termont

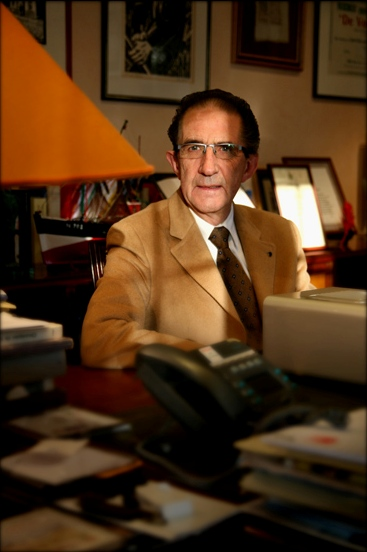
Willy Claes

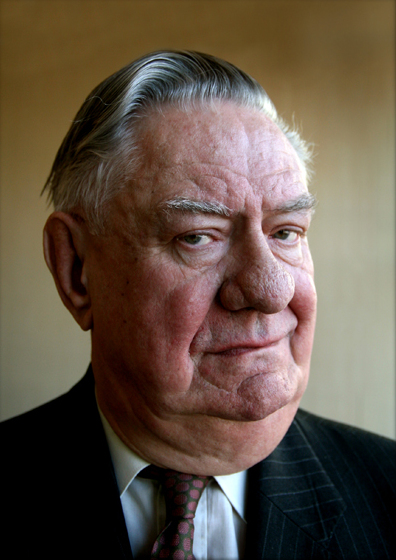
Fons Verplaetse
