= Cees Veerman (musician) =

Dutch musician (1943–2014)

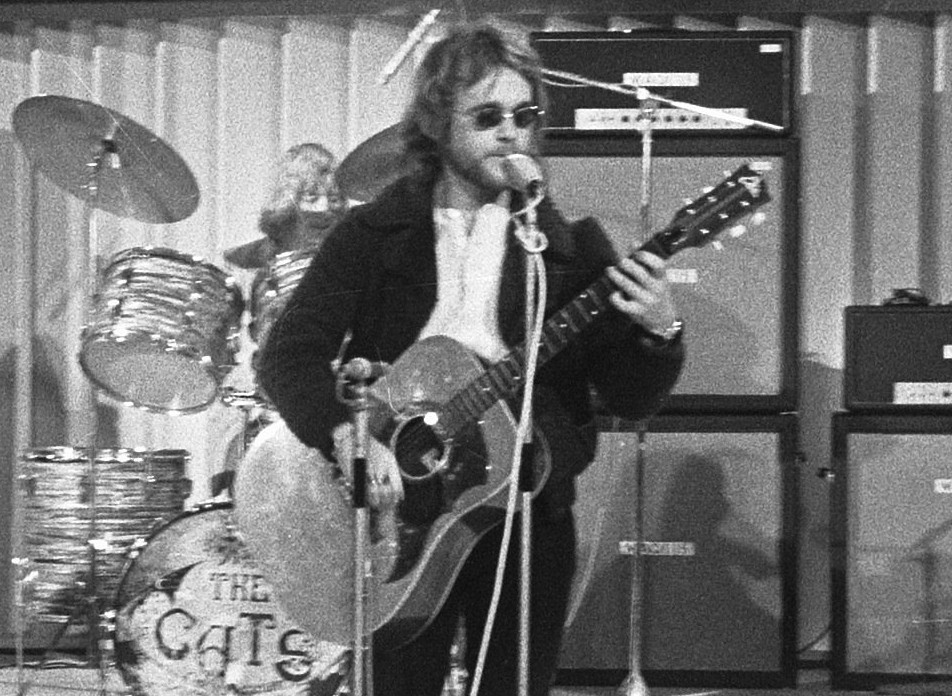
Veerman with The Cats in February 1970.

Cees Veerman (6 October 1943 – 15 March 2014) was a Dutch musician. He was a singer, composer and guitarist for the rock band The Cats. He was born in Volendam in the province of North Holland.

Veerman died in his sleep on the morning of 15 March 2014 in Yogyakarta, Yogyakarta Special Region, Indonesia. He was 70 years old.

== Other websites ==
- Cees Veerman at Discogs
