= The Love in Your Eyes (album) =

Studio album by The Cats
- Released: 1974
- Genre: Pop rock
- Label: Fantasy F9449

The Love in Your Eyes is a studio album from 1974 by the Dutch pop band The Cats. Recorded in Larrabee Sound Studios with the help of backing musicians, Billboard said its "crisp pop selections" should make it a commercially successful album; they also praised its technical qualities. The Billboard reviewer remarked that the album was in the softer rock vein, and the best songs were those where the singers harmonized. They also noted that dealers should place this also in the "foreign rock bin", and if they didn't have one, they should consider starting one "with the vast amount of product coming from the continent".

== Track listing ==
=== A side ===
1. "Be My Day"
2. "A Clown Never Cries"
3. "If You'll Be My Woman"
4. "The Love in Your Eyes"
5. "Saturday Mornings and the Western Show"
6. "Let's Dance"

=== B side ===
1. "If You're Gonna Tangle (In a Love Triangle)"
2. "She's On Her Own"
3. "Time Machine"
4. "One Way Wind"
5. "Moonchild"
6. "A Letter"
