= Nick & Simon =

Dutch singer-songwriter duo

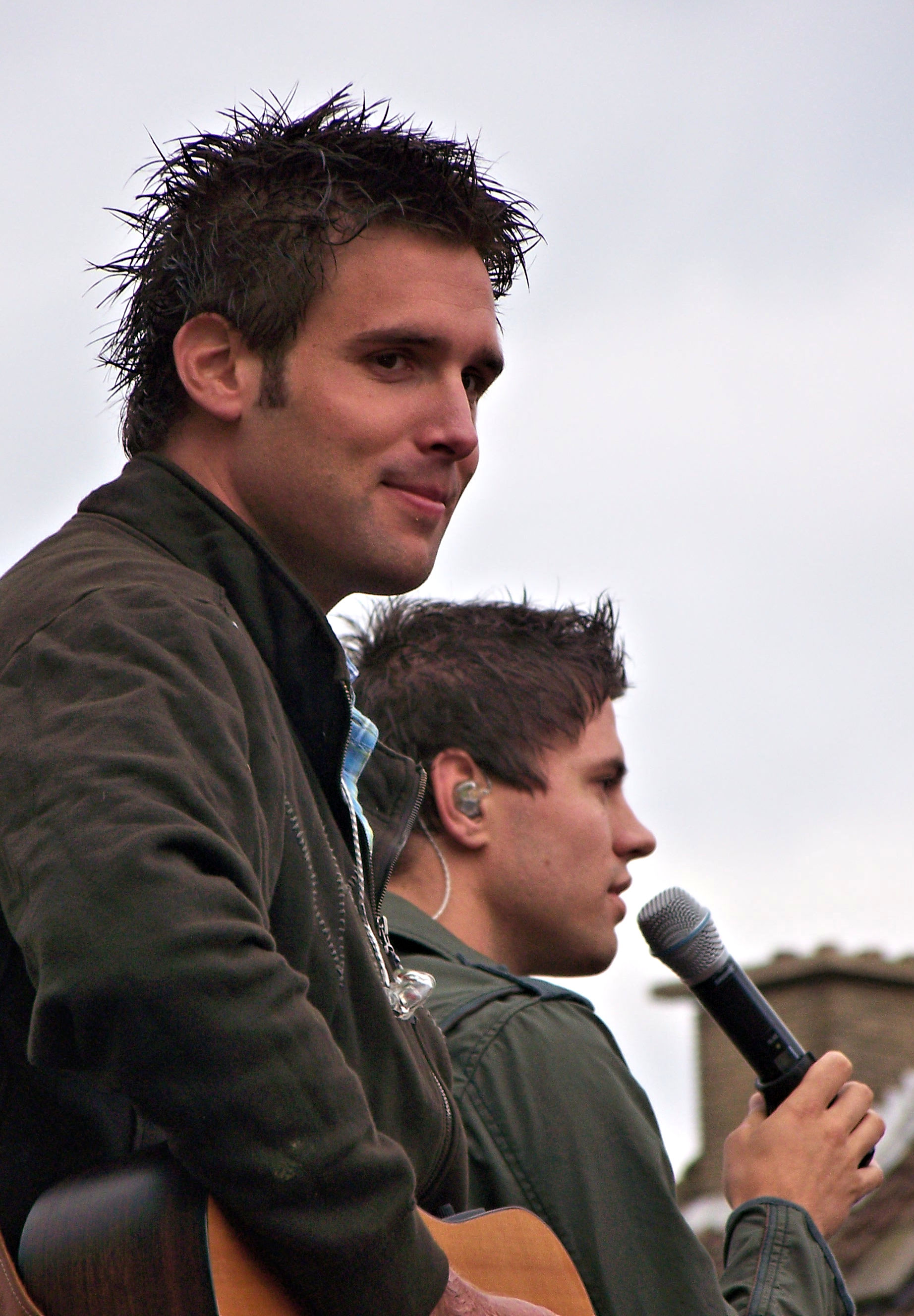
- Nick & Simon performing in Assen in 2007.

Background information
- Origin: Volendam, Netherlands
- Genre: Palingsound
- Years active: 2006–2023
- Labels: Volendam Music, Artist & Music
- Members: Nick Schilder; Simon Keizer
- Website: www.nickensimon.nl

Nick & Simon were a Dutch singer-songwriter duo composed of Simon Keizer and Nick Schilder. They became popular in their home country the Netherlands in 2006. Their album Luister (Listen) reached double platinum status in four months. In June 2011 they tried to find "the American Dream" in their TV documentary show, Nick & Simon, The American Dreamteam.

Nick made his first TV appearance on the show Idols, the Dutch version of Idol, where he finished in 11th place. Shortly after, Nick and Simon began to perform together. They were the most booked artists in the Netherlands in 2007.

The duo were coaches in the first three seasons of The Voice of Holland. Nick & Simon did not return for the fourth season.

The duo announced they will split up after completing their Nu of Ooit tour, citing wanting more room for individual creativity and having long aspired for solo careers.

== Discography ==
Nick & Simon discography
- Studio albums: 8
- Live albums: 4
- Compilation albums: 1
- Singles: 30

=== Albums ===
==== Studio albums ====
Title	Album details	Peak chart positions		Certifications
Title	Album details	NL	BEL (FL)	Certifications
Nick & Simon	Released: 13 May 2006; Label: Artist & Company	6	—	NVPI: 2× Platinum
Vandaag	Released: 21 September 2007; Label: Artist & Company	1	—	NVPI: 4× Platinum
Luister	Released: 13 February 2009; Label: Artist & Company	1	28	NVPI: 2× Platinum
Fier	Released: 1 October 2010; Label: Artist & Company	1	9	BEA: Platinum; NVPI: 2× Platinum
Sterker	Released: 21 September 2012; Label: Artist & Company	1	3	NVPI: Platinum
Christmas with Nick & Simon – Merry X-mas Everyone!	Released: 19 October 2013; Label: Artist & Company	2	43	
Ein neuer Tag	Released: 11 April 2014; Label: Artist & Company	34	—	
Christmas with Nick & Simon – It's Beginning to Look a Lot Like Christmas	Released: 7 November 2014; Label: Artist & Company	1	91	NVPI: Platinum
Open	Released: 18 September 2015; Label: Artist & Company	1	8	NVPI: Gold
Aangenaam	Released: 29 September 2017; Label: Artist & Company	1	5	
NSG	Released: 6 November 2020; Label: Artist & Company	1	13	
"—" denotes items which were not released in that country or failed to chart.

==== Live albums ====
Title	Album details	Peak chart positions		Certifications
Title	Album details	NL	BEL (FL)	Certifications
Symphonica in Rosso	Released: 25 November 2011; Label: Artist & Company	1	43	NVPI: 2× Platinum

==== Compilation albums ====
Title	Album details	Peak chart positions	
Title	Album details	NL	BEL (FL)
Herinneringen – Het beste van Nick & Simon	Released: 20 June 2014; Label: Artist & Company	1	4
Nu of ooit	Released: 4 November 2022; Label: Artist & Company, Warner	1	20

=== Singles ===
==== As lead artist ====
Title	Year	Peak chart positions			Certifications	Album
Title	Year	NL Top 40	NL Top 100	BEL (FL)	Certifications	Album
"Steeds weer"	2006	— (Note: "Steeds weer" did not enter the Dutch Top 40, but peaked at number four on the Tipparade chart, which acts as an extension to the Dutch Top 40.)	15	—		Nick & Simon
"Verloren"	2006	—	25	—		Nick & Simon
"Vaarwel verleden" / "De soldaat"	2006	21	9	—		Nick & Simon
"Herwinnen" (with the Metropole Orchestra)	2007	21	6	—		Nick & Simon
"Kijk omhoog"	2007	6	2	—		Vandaag
"Pak maar m'n hand"	2007	12	1	—		Vandaag
"Rosanne"	2008	4	3	—		Vandaag
"Hoe lang?"	2008	3	1	—		Vandaag
"Vallende sterren"	2009	19	1	—		Luister
"De dag dat alles beter is"	2009	28	1	—		Luister
"Lippen op de mijne"	2009	13	1	—	NVPI: Gold	Luister
"Het masker"	2009	8	1	—		Luister
"Door jou"	2010	—	—	14		Luister
"Een nieuwe dag"	2010	26	1	— (Note: "Een nieuwe dag" did not enter the Ultratop 50, but peaked at number 45 on the Ultratip chart, which acts as an extension to the Ultratop 50.)		Fier
"Vlinders"	2010	22	5	—		Fier
"Wijzer (dan je was)"	2011	27	1	— (Note: "Wijzer (dan je was)" did not enter the Ultratop 50, but peaked at number 14 on the Ultratip chart, which acts as an extension to the Ultratop 50.)		Symphonica in Rosso
"Een zomer lang"	2011	— (Note: "Een zomer lang" did not enter the Dutch Top 40, but peaked at number two on the Tipparade chart, which acts as an extension to the Dutch Top 40.)	3	—		Fier
"Bij je zijn"	2011	—	6	—		Symphonica in Rosso
"Vrij"	2012	4	— (Note: "Vrij" did not enter the Ultratop 50, but peaked at number 72 on the Ultratip chart, which acts as an extension to the Ultratop 50.)		Sterker	
"Alles overwinnen"	2012	22	1	— (Note: "Alles overwinnen" did not enter the Ultratop 50, but peaked at number 50 on the Ultratip chart, which acts as an extension to the Ultratop 50.)	Sterker	
"Ze lijkt net niet op jou"	2012	— (Note: "Ze lijkt net niet op jou" did not enter the Dutch Top 40, but peaked at number one on the Tipparade chart, which acts as an extension to the Dutch Top 40.)	4	— (Note: "Ze lijkt net niet op jou" did not enter the Ultratop 50, but peaked at number 32 on the Ultratip chart, which acts as an extension to the Ultratop 50.)	Sterker	
"Julia"	2013	1	1	— (Note: "Julia" did not enter the Ultratop 50, but peaked at number 42 on the Ultratip chart, which acts as an extension to the Ultratop 50.)	Sterker	NVPI: Platinum
"Geluksmoment"	2013	— (Note: "Geluksmoment" did not enter the Dutch Top 40, but peaked at number nine on the Tipparade chart, which acts as an extension to the Dutch Top 40.)	59	— (Note: "Geluksmoment" did not enter the Ultratop 50, but peaked at number 84 on the Ultratip chart, which acts as an extension to the Ultratop 50.)	Sterker	
"Best Time of the Year"	2013	— (Note: "Best Time of the Year" did not enter the Dutch Top 40, but peaked at number fourteen on the Tipparade chart, which acts as an extension to the Dutch Top 40.)	50	— (Note: "Best Time of the Year" did not enter the Ultratop 50, but peaked at number 83 on the Ultratip chart, which acts as an extension to the Ultratop 50.)		Christmas with Nick & Simon – Merry X-mas Everyone!
"Dans heel dicht bij mij"	2014	— (Note: "Dans heel dicht bij mij" did not enter the Dutch Top 40, but peaked at number two on the Tipparade chart, which acts as an extension to the Dutch Top 40.)	16	— (Note: "Best Time of the Year" did not enter the Ultratop 50, but peaked at number 56 on the Ultratip chart, which acts as an extension to the Ultratop 50.)		Herinneringen – Het beste van Nick & Simon
"Mia"	2014	—	—	— (Note: "Mia" did not enter the Ultratop 50, but peaked at number 31 on the Ultratip chart, which acts as an extension to the Ultratop 50.)		Herinneringen – Het beste van Nick & Simon
"Leve de vrouw"	2014	— (Note: "Leve de vrouw" did not enter the Dutch Top 40, but peaked at number three on the Tipparade chart, which acts as an extension to the Dutch Top 40.)	42	— (Note: "Leve de vrouw" did not enter the Ultratop 50, but peaked at number 65 on the Ultratip chart, which acts as an extension to the Ultratop 50.)		Herinneringen – Het beste van Nick & Simon
"Pak van mijn hart"	2014	—	85	— (Note: "Pak van mijn hart" did not enter the Ultratop 50, but peaked at number 60 on the Ultratip chart, which acts as an extension to the Ultratop 50.)		Non-album single
"Open je hart"	2015	— (Note: "Open je hart" did not enter the Dutch Top 40, but peaked at number eight on the Tipparade chart, which acts as an extension to the Dutch Top 40.)	72	— (Note: "Open je hart" did not enter the Ultratop 50, but peaked at number 23 on the Ultratip chart, which acts as an extension to the Ultratop 50.)		Open
"Met dank aan jou"	2015	— (Note: "Met dank aan jou" did not enter the Dutch Top 40, but peaked at number seven on the Tipparade chart, which acts as an extension to the Dutch Top 40.)	—	—		Open
"Ik weet dat je sterker bent"	2016	—	—	— (Note: "Ik weet dat je sterker bent" did not enter the Ultratop 50, but peaked at number 37 on the Ultratip chart, which acts as an extension to the Ultratop 50.)		Open
"Mum van tijd"	2018	—	—	— (Note: "Mum van tijd" did not enter the Ultratop 50, but peaked at number 46 on the Ultratip chart, which acts as an extension to the Ultratop 50.)		TBA
"—" denotes items which were not released in that country or failed to chart.

==== Other appearances ====
Title	Year	Peak chart positions	
Title	Year	NL Top 40	NL Top 100
"Kijk me na" (Keizer & De Munnik)	2011	7	1
"Sterker nu dan ooit" (Nick & Thomas)	2011	7	1
"One Thousand Voices" (among the coaches of The Voice of Holland)	2012	1	1
"—" denotes items which were not released in that country or failed to chart.
