= Palingsound =

Genre of Dutch music

Palingpop
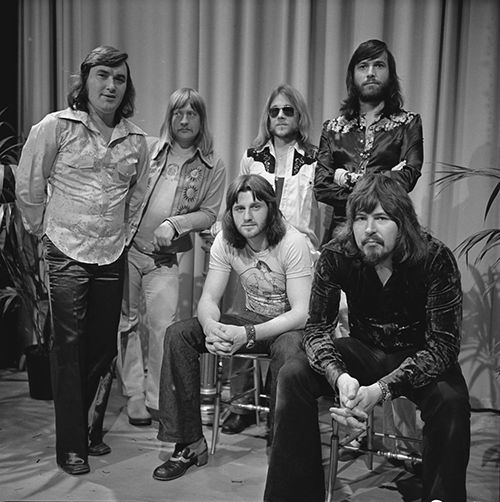
- The Cats, regarded as the first palingsound band
- Etymology: Dutch eel pop
- Other names: Palingsound
- Stylistic origins: Nederpop; Rock music; Beat music; Rhythm and blues; Choir; Orchestration
- Cultural origins: Late 1960s-early 1970s, Volendam, Netherlands

Palingsound (/pɑːlɪŋsaʊnt/; lit. 'European eel sound') is the unique musical sound attributed to a subgenre of Dutch pop music called palingpop ('Eel Pop'). 'Palingsound' is also frequently used as a synonym for the genre palingpop as a whole. The term references the origin of many of the artists making music this way, the (eel) fisherman's town of Volendam. Palingsound refers to a smooth melodic and sometimes sentimental sound, with close vocal harmonies, combined with matching arrangements and a studio mixing style.

== History ==
=== Origin ===
The Cats (1964 -1985) are universally recognized as the originators of palingsound. The Cats were the first Volendamic band to record an album. Their music started off as beat music and over the years evolved to be more focused on melody and harmony. After the lead singer was replaced by Piet Veerman in 1968, the dramatic elements of his voice became sound-determining.

With their lyrical, melodical and somewhat melancholic music, The Cats laid the groundworks for what would become known as palingsound. Further elements that would become influential for palingsound from this period in the music of The Cats would be the added arrangements of jazz musician Wim Jongbloed and the continental European mixing techniques of producer Klaas Leyen.

=== 1970s – Present ===
Palingsound would find many continuers among Volendamic artists after the original success of The Cats. Bands such as Maddog, Left Side, Next One and BZN would pick up the style and continue to expand its popularity with the general public.

Over time, palingsound would no longer only be sung in English, as Dutch-language artists started to adopt the style. Examples of this include Nick & Simon, Jan Smit and Monique Smit.

== Etymology ==
The musical style received the name palingsound early in its history. Music of The Cats was already referred to as palingsound in 1968. Het Vrije Volk would publish an article in March 1968 mentioning: "... the sound is, according to experts, 'a typical palingsound'."

The name's coining has been attributed to Veronica DJ Joost den Draaijer. Den Draaijer coined the term as a reference to the fishing of European eel which is common in Volendam. Another contributing factor to the naming was that Jan Buijs, manager of The Cats, would always bring some European eel for Den Draaijer when he came to the Veronica studio.

== Controversy ==
Not all Volendamic musicians reacted positively to the name and genre. Some band members of The Cats felt like the name mocked them. They would later accept the name after the many successes it brought them.

In 2008, a new controversy arose when the band 3JS reacted in frustration when their music was referred to as palingsound. They claimed that their music was not at all typical palingsound, even though they originate from Volendam. Jaap Kwakman, a band member of 3JS, edited the Dutch Wikipedia article on Palingsound to remove 3JS from the article.
