= Volendam =

- Town
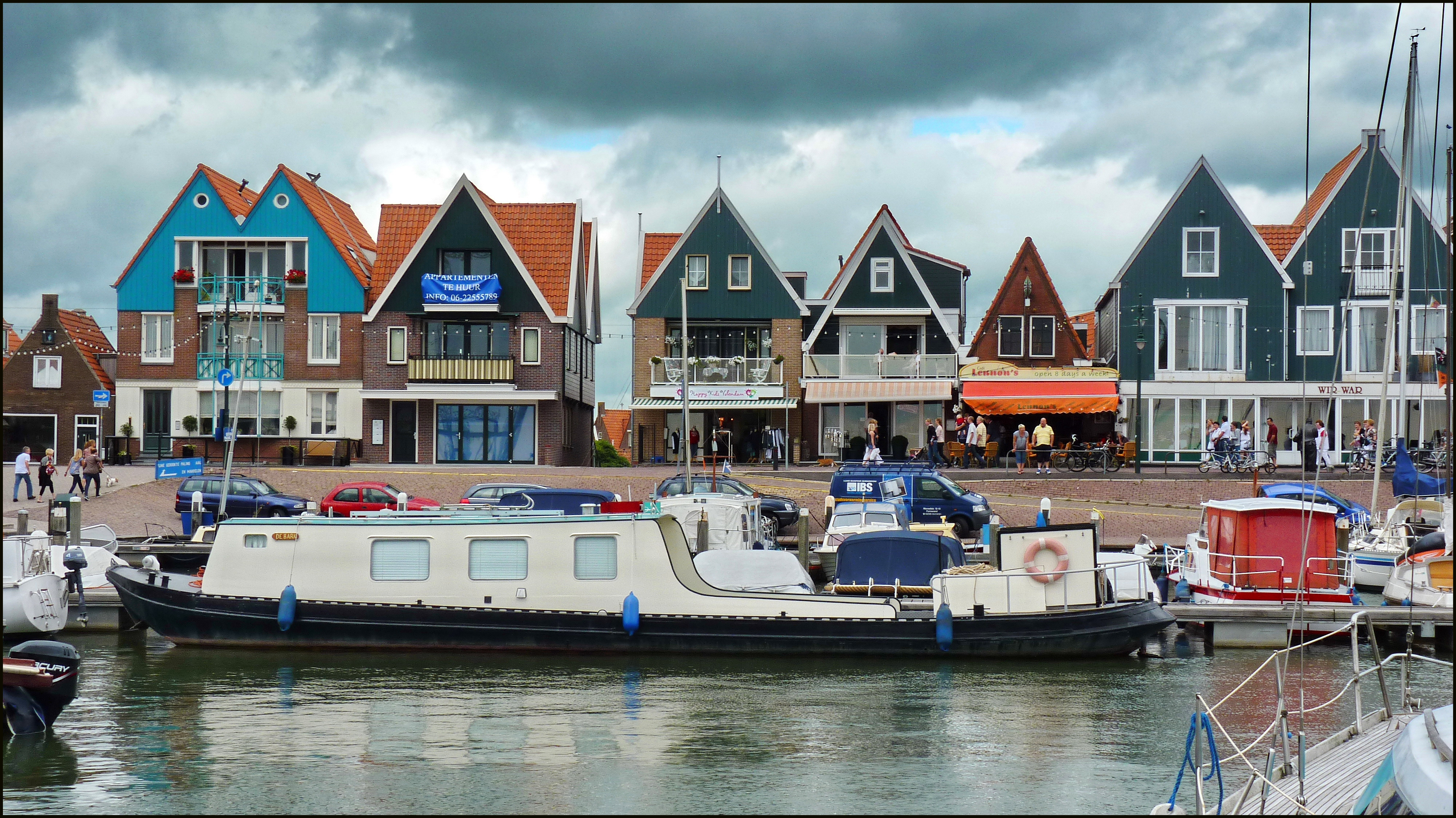
- Volendam harbour

- Flag Coat of arms
- Interactive map of Volendam
- Coordinates: 52°29′58″N 5°04′03″E
- Country: Netherlands
- Province: North Holland
- Municipality: Edam-Volendam

Population (1 January 2021)
  - Total: 22,715

Volendam (Dutch pronunciation: [ˌvoːlə(n)ˈdɑm]) is a tourist town in the municipality of Edam-Volendam, province of North Holland, Netherlands, known for its streets, old fishing boats and the traditional clothing worn by some residents. The women's costume of Volendam, with its high, pointed bonnet, is one of the most recognizable of the Dutch traditional costumes, and is often featured on tourist postcards and posters. As of 1 January 2021, it has a population of 22,715. It is twinned with Coventry, England.

== History ==
=== Early years ===
Originally, Volendam was the location of the harbour of nearby city Edam.

In 1357, the inhabitants of Edam dug a shorter canal to the Zuiderzee with its own separate harbour. This removed the need for the original harbour, which was then dammed and used for land reclamation. Farmers and local fishermen settled there, forming the new community of Vollendam or Follendam, which translates to 'Full dam'.

== Culture ==
=== Dialect ===
In Volendam, the Volendam dialect is spoken, a unique and regional variant of the West Frisian dialect. The Volendam dialect is deeply rooted in the history and culture of the village of Volendam, and it is still used by the majority of its residents in their daily conversations.

=== Traditional costume ===
The Volendam traditional costume, known as "Volendammer klederdracht" in Dutch, is a distinctive attire that hails from the village. This traditional dress has deep historical roots and continues to be a symbol of the village's cultural identity.

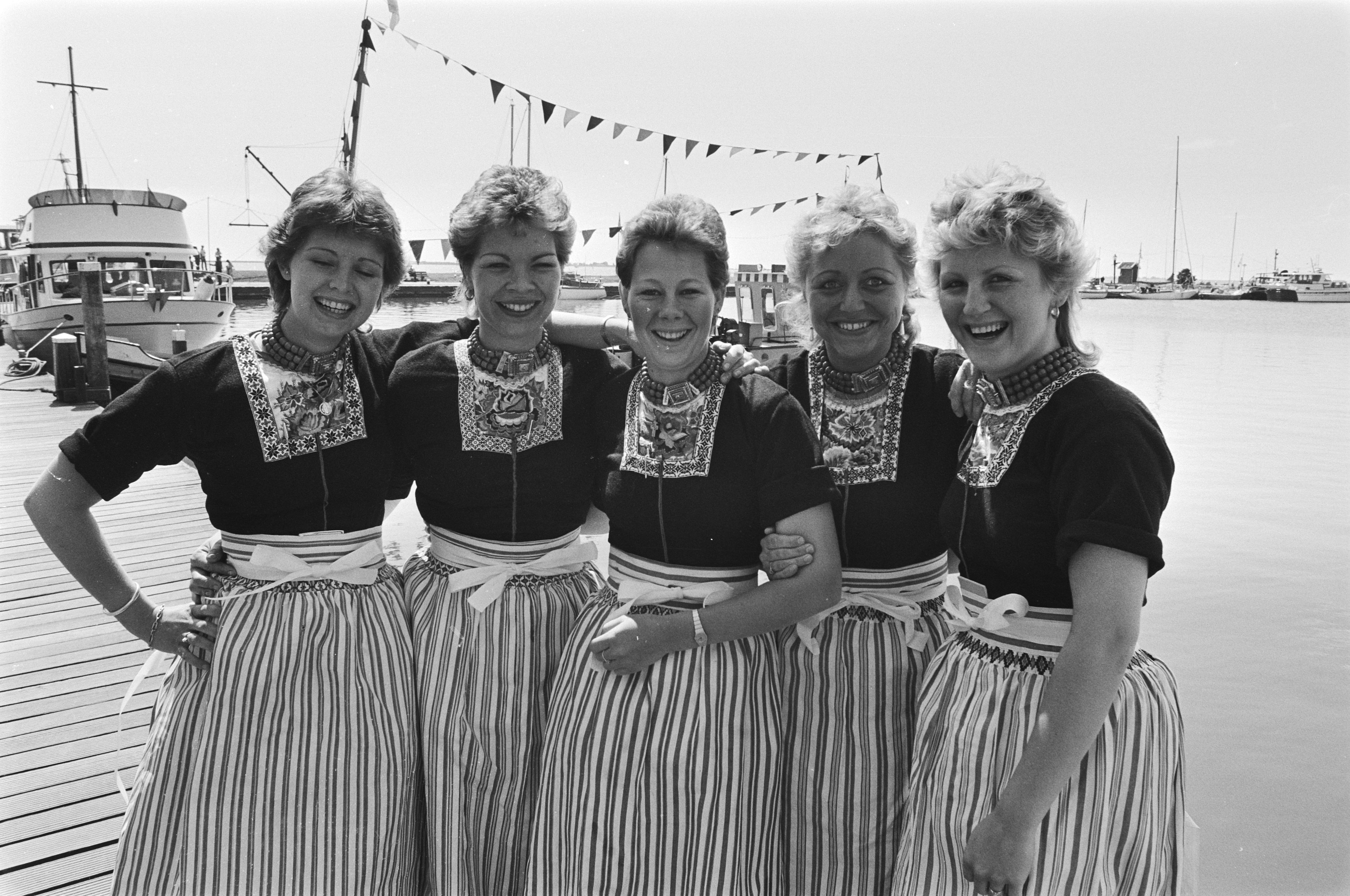
Women in traditional costumes at a traditional festival, 1983

While the traditional costume is no longer worn daily by most Volendam residents, it remains an essential part of the village's identity and is frequently worn during special occasions, celebrations, and cultural festivals like the Volendammer Kermis. It also continues to be a common choice for tourists who visit Volendam, allowing them to immerse themselves in the cultural heritage of this Dutch village.

The costume has become an iconic representation of Dutch culture and is often featured in photographs, postcards, and cultural events.

=== Volendammer Kermis ===
The Volendammer Kermis is an annual festival held in the fishing village of Volendam. This celebration originating in the 18th century typically takes place during the first weekend of September, attracting both locals and visitors from around the country and beyond.

The Volendammer Kermis is a colorful event that showcases the cultural heritage and traditions of Volendam. It spans four days and includes a number of fairground rides, games, live music performances, and Dutch food and beverages.

== Arts ==
In the late 19th and early 20th century, Volendam attracted a diverse community of artists who were captivated by the authentic and picturesque life of the inhabitants of Volendam.

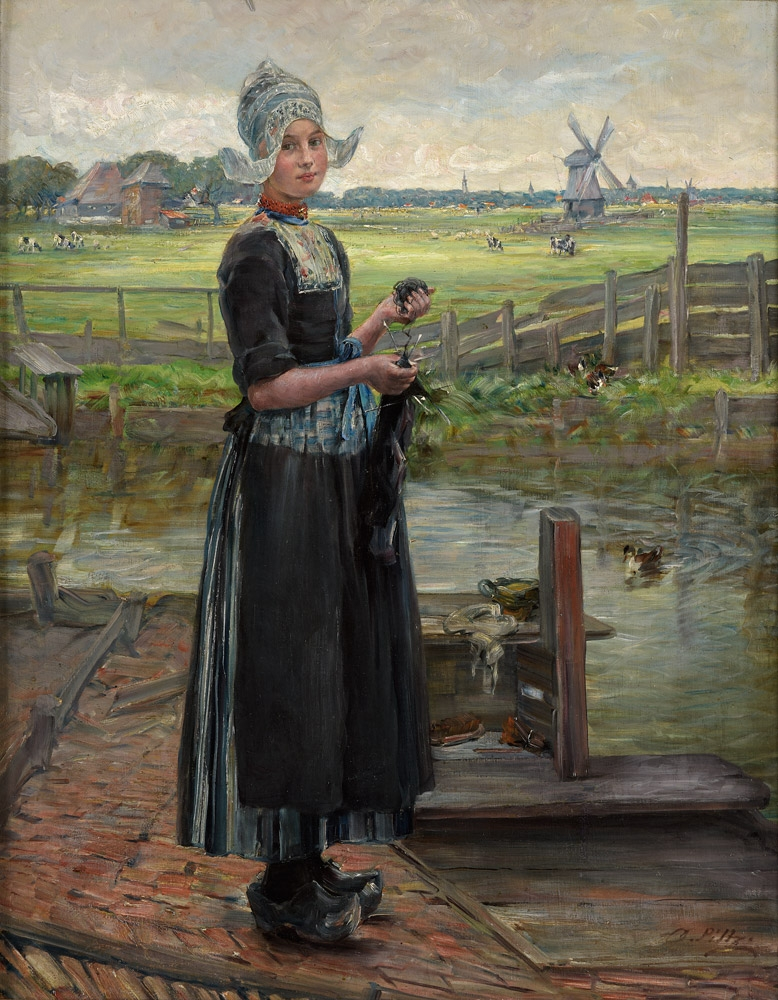
Dutch girl, Otto Piltz (1908)

=== Hotel Spaander ===
During that era, Hotel Spaander became a central hub for these artists as it provided accommodations and workshops for artists to nurture their craft. The hotel garnered acclaim within the art world, and the presence of foreign artists at Hotel Spaander made a significant contribution to Volendam's global renown as their artworks, often influenced by Volendam's scenery, further elevated the village's profile and celebrated its culture.

Today, Hotel Spaander maintains a collection of over 1300 artworks created in Volendam, including contemporary pieces acquired through an 'Artist in Residence' program, preserving its rich artistic heritage.

A significant number of paintings inspired by Volendam adorns the walls of internationally renowned museums, including Tate Britain, National Gallery of Art, Ulster Museum, Museum Boijmans Van Beuningen, Van Gogh Museum, and the Rijksmuseum.

== Religion ==
The majority of the population traditionally belongs to the Roman Catholic Church, which is deeply connected to the village culture. Historically, many missionaries and bishops grew up in Volendam. Today there is the chapel of Our Lady of the Water, which is located in a village park.

== Sports ==
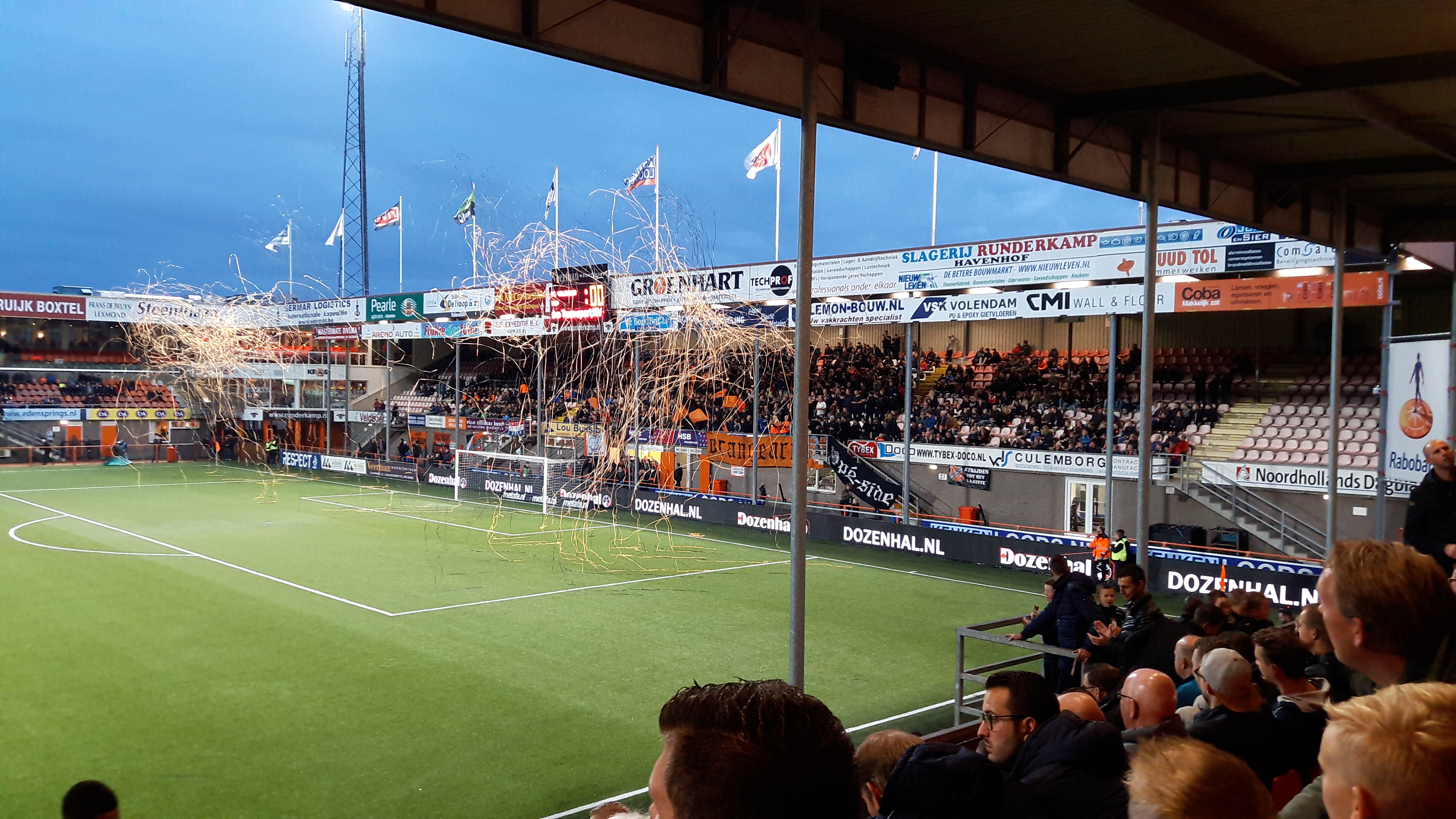
FC Volendam’s home ground Kras Stadion

FC Volendam is a football club based in Volendam, which has regularly played in the Dutch Eredivisie. FC Volendam promoted to the Eredivisie in 2022 after a 13 year stint in the Eerste Divisie. After the 2023-24 season, FC Volendam were relegated back down to the Eerste Divisie. But they managed to bounce back the season right after.

== Film ==
Volendam was a shooting location in Vikas Bahl's 2014 Bollywood film, Queen featuring Indian actress Kangana Ranaut.

== Music ==
Volendam is also well known for its distinctive music, which is called Palingsound (literally "eel sound") because of Volendam's status as a fishing village. During the 1960s, the local group The Cats was popular in the Netherlands and abroad.

Another band from Volendam was BZN, which became popular in the late 1960s and early 1970s. In 1995 BZN performed a duet with the ten-year-old Jan Smit, who quickly became a celebrity in his own right.

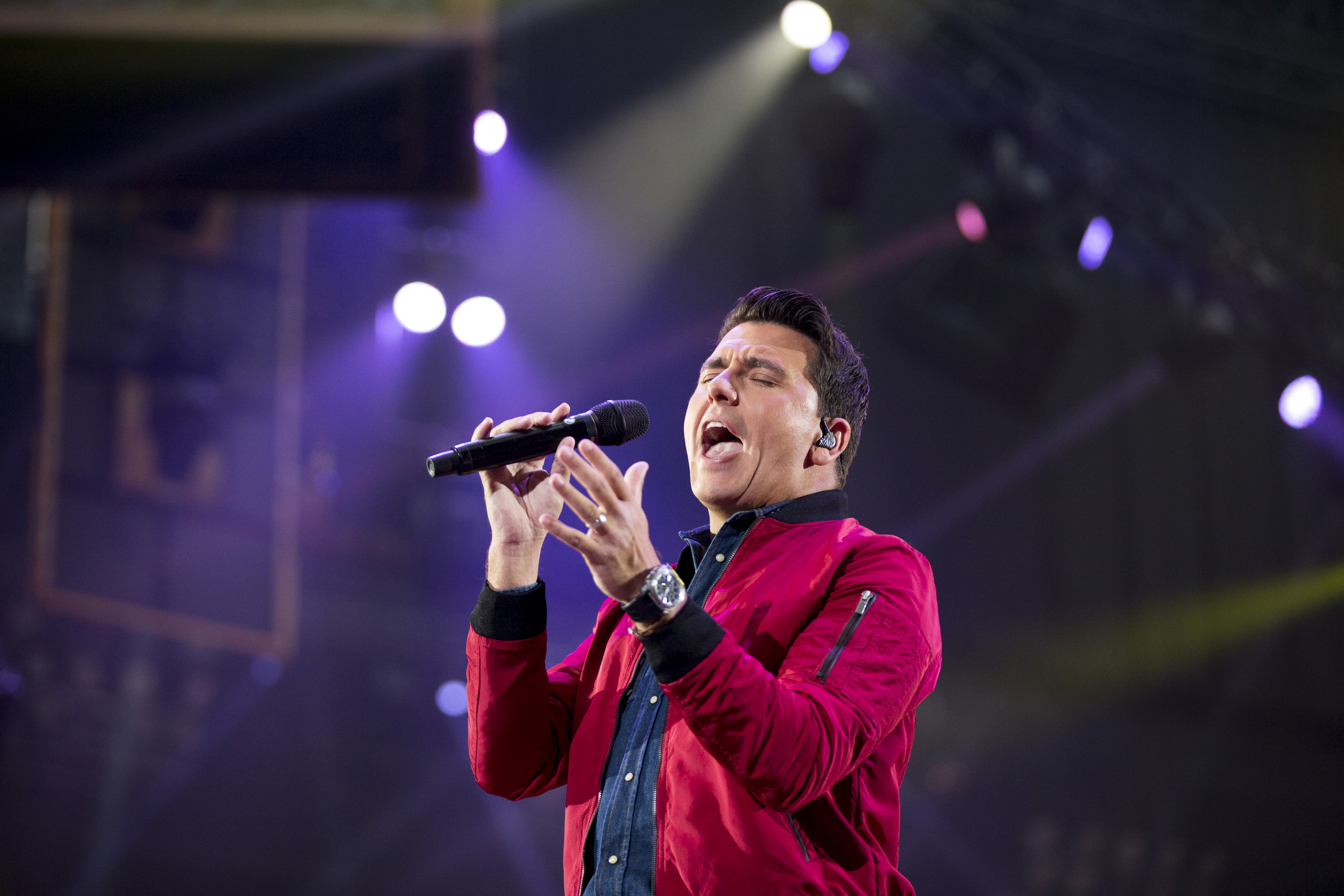
Jan Smit

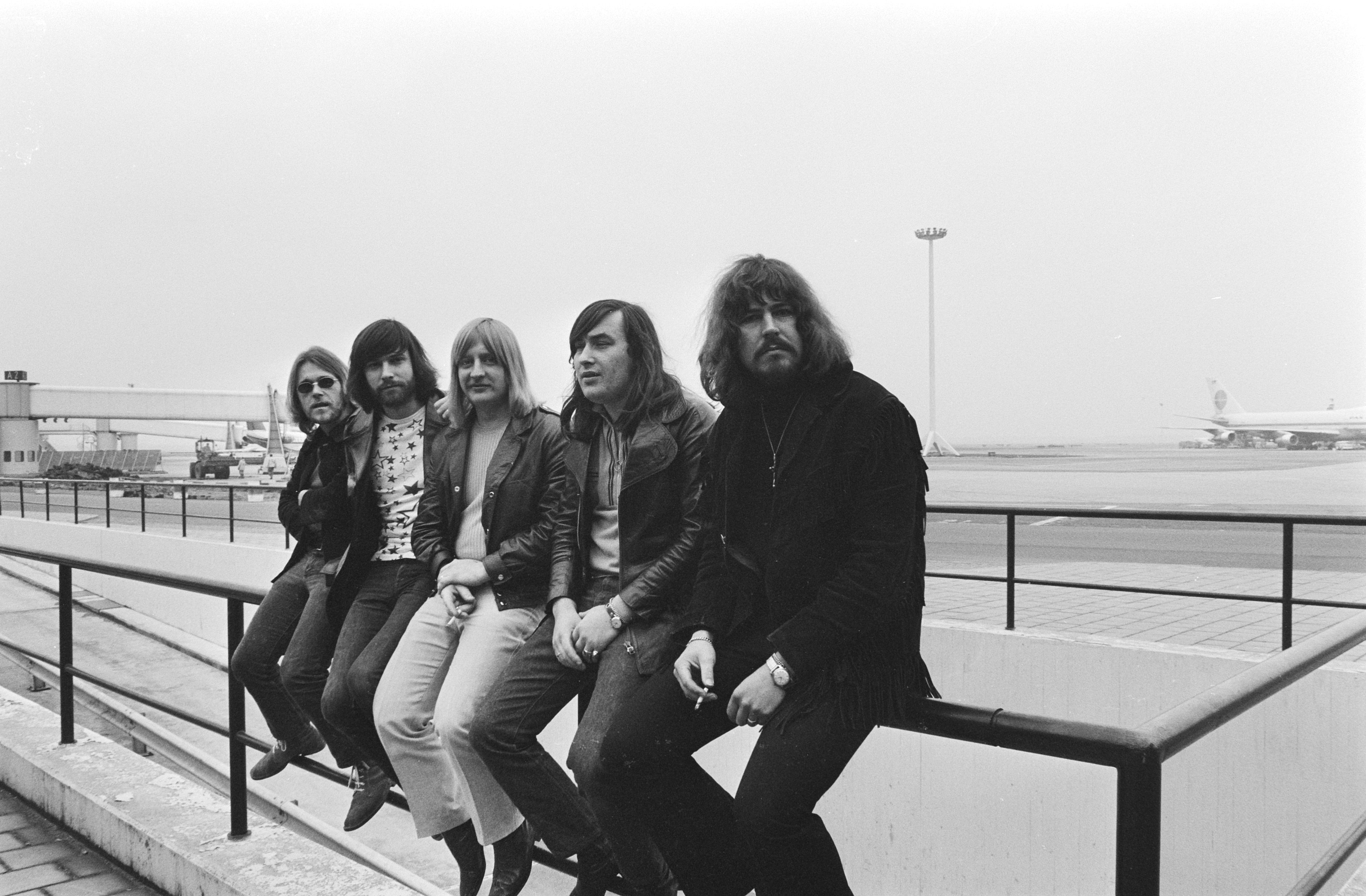
The Cats

The music groups 3JS and Nick & Simon are from Volendam, whose members have all participated in local musical performances through the years.

== New Year's fire ==
In the New Year's night of 2000 to 2001, the lighting of a bundle of sparklers caused a short but intense fire at a party in café De Hemel. The sparklers ignited the dry Christmas decorations on the ceiling, which fell down in their entirety. 14 people died and 200 people were seriously injured.

== Notable people ==
- Gerrie Mühren (born 1946), international footballer
- Jan Keizer (born 1949), singer
- Arnold Mühren (born 1951), international footballer
- Pier Tol (born 1958), international footballer
- Carla Braan (born 1961), gymnast
- Carola Smit (born 1963), singer
- Wim Jonk (born 1966), international footballer
- Nick Schilder (born 1983), singer
- Simon Keizer (born 1984), singer
- Jan Smit (born 1985), singer
- Cees Keizer (born 1986), footballer
- Janey Jacké (born 1992) a Dutch drag performer who competed in Drag Race Holland season 1 and RuPaul's Drag Race: UK vs. the World was born in Purmerend but grew up in Volendam.
