= Dutch Top 40 =

Dutch singles chart

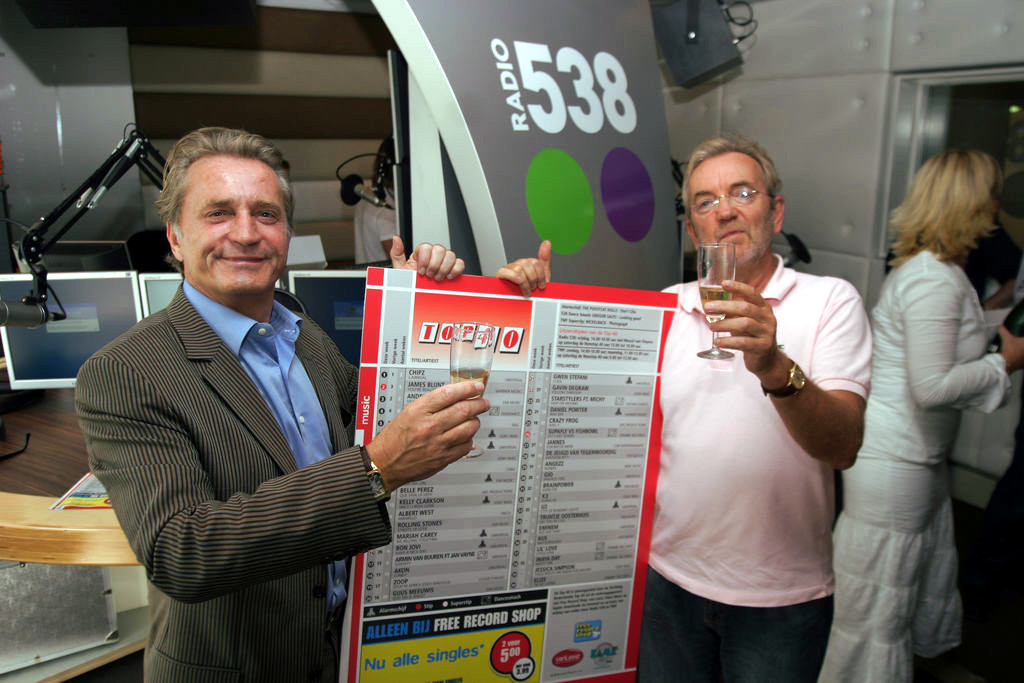
Hans Breukhoven and Lex Harding celebrating a printed edition of the Dutch Top 40 in 2005

The Dutch Top 40 (Dutch: Nederlandse Top 40) is a weekly music popularity chart compiled by Stichting Nederlandse Top 40. It was first published and broadcast on 2 January 1965 by Radio Veronica, a Dutch offshore radio station that had been looking for a reliable weekly chart based on Dutch record sales. The Veronica Top 40 - as the chart was titled until 1974 - was conceived by Veronica DJ Joost den Draaijer while on a business trip to New York in 1964. The chart was broadcast every Saturday afternoon and was issued as a printed leaflet ("Het gedrukte exemplaar") (something Den Draaijer had seen in the US) which fans could get for free from their local record store.

It is currently broadcast by Dutch radio station Q Music every Friday afternoon. In 2025 it celebrated its 60th anniversary, making it one of the oldest music charts in the world that did not change format or length during its existence.

== History ==
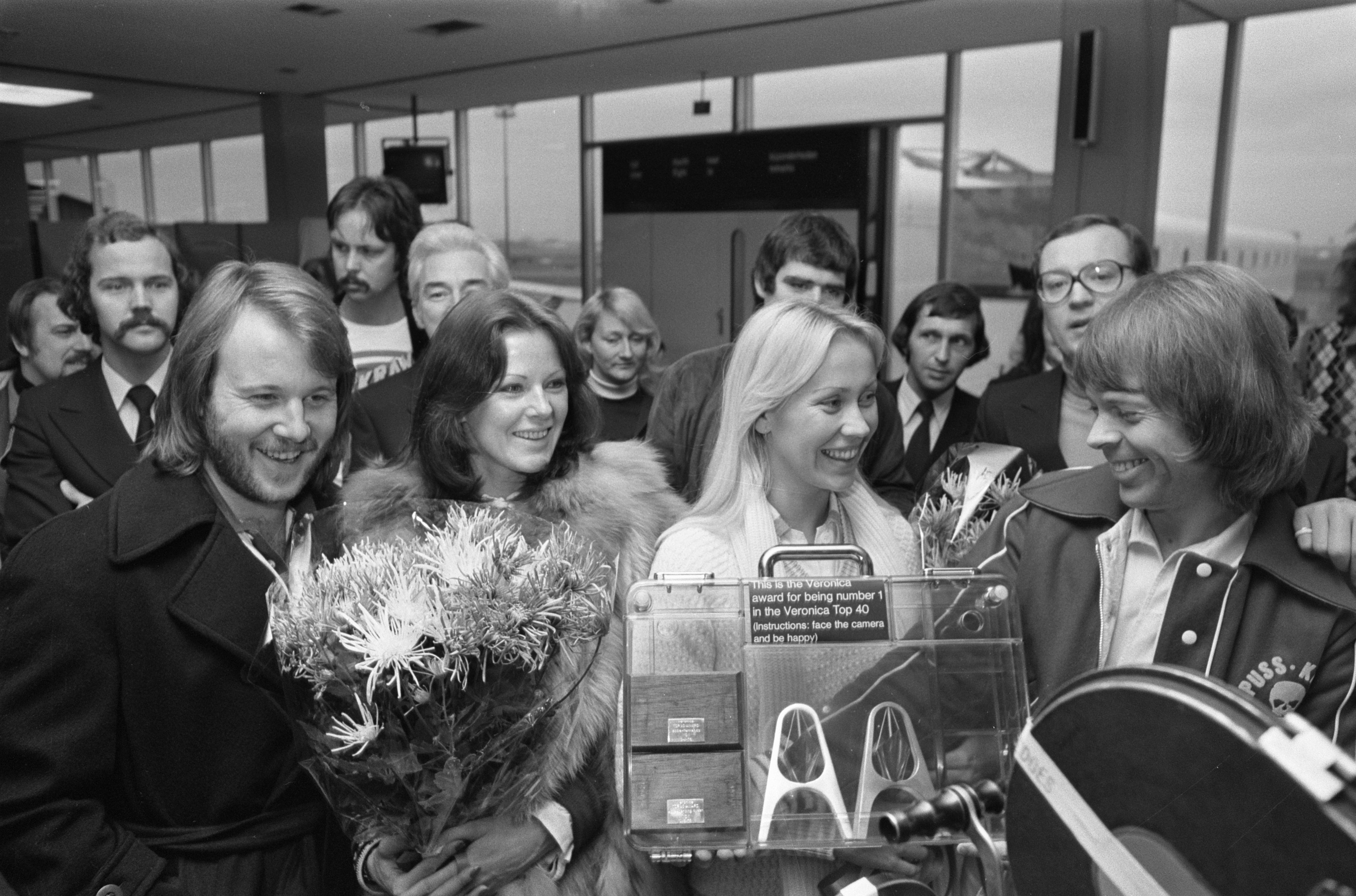
Swedish pop group ABBA receiving an award for reaching the top of the Veronica Top

On January 2, 1965, the first Top 40 was compiled, with its first #1 hit "I Feel Fine" by The Beatles. In September 1974, Radio Veronica was forced to stop its offshore broadcasts, but the Top 40 continued nevertheless. Its name changed to Nederlandse Top 40, to indicate it was now run by an independent organisation rather than a radio station (although the Stichting Nederlandse Top 40 was operated by former Veronica DJ's). The Top 40 was temporarily broadcast by TROS, one of the Netherlands' public broadcasters on pop station Hilversum 3. This was ironic, as Radio Veronica and Hilversum 3 had always been each other's big competitors.

In 1976, Veronica - now an official radio and television public broadcaster - took over the Top 40 from TROS again, this time broadcasting the chart on Fridays.

Due to the complicated Dutch system of having several public broadcasters sharing airtime on one radio station (Hilversum 3 - and later Radio 3), there were several charts on Radio 3 for years. In 1993, the broadcasters wanted to end this situation by abolishing all charts and replace them by one new pop chart, the Mega Top 50. By the end of 1993, the last Top 40 on Radio 3 was broadcast.

It didn't mean the end of the Top 40, however. Commercial radio station Radio 538, initiated by several former Veronica-DJ's and personnel, took over the Top 40 and remained broadcasting it until December 2018.

A week after the final Top 40 on Radio 538, Q Music adopted the chart and has since broadcast it every Friday afternoon.

== Compilation ==
=== Composition ===
For most of its history, the Top 40 was based on sales figures of record stores. These were collected through telephone surveys. As of 1999, the airplay of a limited number of radio stations was included. Between 2006 and 2014, download figures were added to the mix. They were removed again because supposedly, download sales could be easily manipulated by record companies or artists.

As of February 2014, the chart is a combination of airplay, streaming, and social media trends. The more often a song gets played on the radio, the higher its ranking in the Top 40.

To compute year-end chart positions, the weekly #1 positions get 40 points, the #2 positions get 39 points, etc. These weekly scores are then added up and sorted by single to determine the ranking.

==== Tipparade ====
The Tipparade, a 'bubbling under' chart for the Top 40, is based on sales, streaming, airplay, and recommendations from both the general public and the music industry. It started in 1967 as a random list of "tips" for the Top 40, compiled by Veronica's DJ's. It wasn't included in the Top 40 printed leaflet until 1970.

=== Rules ===
There is a set of rules, of which some have existed since 1972, that has been maintained up until 2012. Some of these have been criticized as a hindrance.

- Since late 1971, singles had to remain at least two weeks in the charts. If a single officially no longer belongs in the Top 40, these are placed at #40.
  - Example: Missy Elliott's "Lose Control": Remained for two weeks at #40 in the chart, because it did not sell enough and also wasn't played enough on the radio.
  - There have been two exceptions to this: In October 1994, Pet Shop Boys' "Yesterday, When I Was Mad" stayed in the charts for only one week due to an error in the compilation, and in late September 2007, Kus's "4 meiden" didn't sell enough to stay in the charts for two weeks.
- Since 1983, singles that move up in the chart by a large number of positions are assigned superstip ("super bullet") status. These singles were not allowed to fall down in chart position in the following week. If a superstip single had comparatively lower sales/airplay statistics a week later, it would remain stuck on the same chart position until the second week of drop, by which time it may appear as if it dropped hard in chart positions.
  - Example: Guus Meeuwis's "Ik wil dat ons land juicht": The song entered the chart at #11 (superstip), and rose up to #5 (superstip again) in its second week. The following week it was meant to drop in chart position, but it remained in the #5 position. The following two weeks, it went from #5 to #39. Because of this rule, this single was the biggest fall down in the Top 40. Sometimes singles with a superstip status did drop, for example, if there's no room.
- Until 2005 there were no clear rules on when a single could re-enter the Top 40. A song had to re-enter at least in the top 30 portions of the chart to be allowed back, which happened occasionally. In the case of re-issued singles, there were no rules whatsoever - these singles could re-enter at any position. New rules were implemented in 2005; only songs from recently deceased artists could return to the Top 40, such as songs from Whitney Houston and Michael Jackson, after their deaths in 2012 and 2009, respectively. Since 2012, regular tallied re-entries have started to occur again. During the Christmas season, re-entries of older Christmas songs (such as Wham!'s Last Christmas) are ineligible to re-enter the Top 40, even if streaming and airplay activity would have otherwise positioned the song on the Top 40 chart.
- Singles with double A-side are listed separately in the Top 40; due to the (possible) different amount of airplay the two songs get.
  - Example: Robbie Williams' first single off his 2005 album Intensive Care was "Tripping" with the B-side being "Make Me Pure". While "Tripping" topped the chart by peaking at #1, "Make Me Pure" peaked at #15 in the Top 40.

== Records, milestones and achievements ==
This is a listing of significant achievements and milestones based upon the Dutch Top 40 charts.

=== Song achievements ===
==== Most weeks at number one ====
- 18 weeks

Harry Styles – "As It Was" (2022)

- 17 weeks

Lady Gaga and Bruno Mars – "Die with a Smile" (2024–25)
Alex Warren – "Ordinary" (2025)

- 16 weeks

Calvin Harris with Dua Lipa – "One Kiss" (2018)
Miley Cyrus – "Flowers" (2023)

- 15 weeks

Ed Sheeran – "Shape of You" (2017)
Luis Fonsi & Daddy Yankee featuring Justin Bieber – "Despacito (Remix)" (2017)
Tones and I – "Dance Monkey" (2019–2020)
Tate McRae – "Greedy" (2023–24)
Shakira and Burna Boy – "Dai Dai" (2026)

==== Most total weeks in the Top 40 ====
- 49 weeks

Pharrell Williams – "Happy" (2013–14)

- 45 weeks

Zara Larsson – "Lush Life" (2015-16, 2025-26)

- 44 weeks

Alex Warren – "Ordinary" (2025)

- 42 weeks

Lewis Capaldi – "Someone You Loved" (2019)

- 41 weeks

Corry En De Rekels – "Huilen Is Voor Jou Te Laat" (1970–71)

- 40 weeks

The Scorpions – "Hello Josephine" (1965, 1977)
Trio Hellenique – "Zorba's Dance" (1965–66, 1974) (Note: Three different versions of the song (which was featured in the 1964 film Zorba the Greek), performed by Trio Hellenique, Mikis Theodorakis and Duo Acropolis, were combined as one chart entry (which happened more often in the 1960s), spending 37 weeks on the chart. The Trio Hellenique version spent three more weeks on the chart in 1974, totalling 40 weeks.)
Lady Gaga and Bruno Mars – "Die with a Smile" (2024–25)

- 39 weeks

Jane Birkin and Serge Gainsbourg – "Je T'aime... Moi Non Plus" (1969, 1974)

- 38 weeks

Avicii – "Wake Me Up!" (2013–14, 2018)
Gotye featuring Kimbra – "Somebody That I Used to Know" (2011–12)
Billie Eilish – "Birds of a Feather" (2024-25)

- 37 weeks

Olivia Dean – "Man I Need" (2025-26)

- 35 weeks

Dave Berry – "This Strange Effect" (1965–66)
Nini Rosso – "Il Silenzio" (1965–66)

(Note: Different versions of the song were performed by three different artists, and were listed on the Top 40 as only one song.)

==== Number-one debuts ====
Apart from a few number one entries in the 1960s, it had been impossible to enter the Top 40 at number one for many years due to restrictions in the compilation rules. These were relaxed in the 1990s after Jantje Smit's "Ik zing dit lied voor jou alleen" became the first record in almost 30 years to enter at number one. In recent years, however, number one debuts have become rarer again, possibly due to the influence of streaming and airplay factors.

- The Beatles – "I Feel Fine" (January 2, 1965)
- The Beatles – "We Can Work It Out" / "Day Tripper" (December 25, 1965)
- Procol Harum – "A Whiter Shade of Pale" (June 17, 1967)
- The Beatles – "Hey Jude" (September 14, 1968)
- Jantje Smit – "Ik zing dit lied voor jou alleen" (April 12, 1997)
- Elton John – "Something About the Way You Look Tonight" / "Candle in the Wind 1997" (September 27, 1997)
- 2Pac – "Changes" (February 13, 1999)
- Backstreet Boys – "I Want It That Way" (May 8, 1999)
- Starmaker – "Damn (I Think I Love You)" (April 14, 2001)
- One Day Fly – "I Wanna Be a One Day Fly" (May 19, 2001)
- Shaggy featuring Rayvon – "Angel" (June 23, 2001)
- Shakira – "Whenever, Wherever" (February 9, 2002)
- Jamai – "Step Right Up" (March 29, 2003)
- Jim – "Tell Her" (May 17, 2003)
- Dinand Woesthoff – "Dreamer (Gussie's song)" (February 21, 2004)
- Boris – "When You Think of Me" (May 22, 2004)
- Marco Borsato and Ali B – "Wat zou je doen" (September 25, 2004)
- André Hazes – "Zij gelooft in mij" (October 9, 2004)
- MEN2B – "Bigger Than That" (December 25, 2004)
- Artiesten Voor Azië – "Als je iets kan doen" (January 15, 2005)
- Kane – "Fearless" (August 6, 2005)
- Ch!pz – "Carnival" (August 27, 2005)
- Lange Frans & Baas B – "Het land van..." (October 8, 2005)
- Andrea Bocelli and Marco Borsato – "Because We Believe" (February 11, 2006)
- Raffaëla – "Right Here Right Now" (March 25, 2006)
- Sharon Kips – "Heartbreak Away" (March 10, 2007)
- Jan Smit – "Dan volg je haar benen" (November 3, 2007)
- Nikki – "Hello World" (March 15, 2008)
- Marco Borsato – "Wit licht" (May 3, 2008)
- Marco Borsato – "Stop de tijd" (August 30, 2008)
- Lisa – "Hallelujah" (May 23, 2009)
- Lady Gaga – "Born This Way" (February 26, 2011)
- Nick & Simon – "Julia" (March 23, 2013)
- Adele – "Hello" (October 31, 2015)
- Olivia Rodrigo – "Drivers License" (January 23, 2021)
- Adele – "Easy on Me" (October 23, 2021)
- Joost – "Europapa" (March 9, 2024)
- Roxy Dekker – "Sugardaddy" (April 13, 2024)

=== Artist achievements ===
==== Most Top 40 entries ====
As of the chart dated 23 January 2026

- David Guetta (72)
- BZN (55)
- Madonna (55)
- Michael Jackson (50)
- The Rolling Stones (49)
- Golden Earring (47)
- Queen (46)
- Normaal (46)
- U2 (44)
- P!nk (43)
- Vader Abraham (43)
- Bee Gees (43)
- Marco Borsato (42)
- Bløf (42)
- André Hazes (41)
- Armin van Buuren (41)
- Rihanna (41)
- André van Duin (41)
- Prince (40)

==== Most number-one singles ====
Number of singles	Artist
16	The Beatles
15	Marco Borsato
8	ABBA
7	Justin Bieber
6	Michael Jackson
6	George Michael
6	Jan Smit
6	Queen
6	Ed Sheeran
6	Bruno Mars

Most weeks at number one (Total)
Artist	Record
(United Kingdom) The Beatles	74 weeks
(Netherlands) Marco Borsato	72 weeks
(United States) Bruno Mars	51 weeks
(Canada) Justin Bieber	47 weeks
(United Kingdom) Ed Sheeran	37 weeks
(Colombia) Shakira	32 weeks
(United States) Lady Gaga	29 weeks
(United Kingdom) Adele	27 weeks
(United Kingdom) George Michael	26 weeks
(Netherlands) Jan Smit	25 weeks
(United Kingdom) Elton John	25 weeks
(United Kingdom) Calvin Harris	25 weeks

Most weeks at number one (in 1 year)
Artist	Year	Record
(United Kingdom) The Beatles	1965	30 weeks
(Netherlands) Marco Borsato	2006	22 weeks
(United Kingdom) Ed Sheeran	2017	21 weeks
(United Kingdom) The Beatles	1966	19 weeks
(United Kingdom) Harry Styles	2022	18 weeks
(United States) Alex Warren	2025	17 weeks
(United Kingdom) Calvin Harris	2018	16 weeks
(United Kingdom) Dua Lipa	2018	16 weeks
(United States) Miley Cyrus	2023	16 weeks
(Canada) Justin Bieber	2016	15 weeks
(Canada) Justin Bieber	2017	15 weeks
(Sweden) Avicii	2013	15 weeks
(United States) Pharrell Williams	2013	15 weeks
(United States) Bruno Mars	2024	15 weeks
(United States) Lady Gaga	2024	15 weeks
(Colombia) Shakira	2026	15 weeks
(Nigeria) Burna Boy	2024	15 weeks
