= Beste Zangers =

Dutch reality television show

Beste Zangers, formerly De beste zangers van Nederland (English: The Best Singers (of the Netherlands)), is a Dutch reality television show by public broadcaster AVROTROS (a merger of AVRO and TROS, both part of the Netherlands Public Broadcasting). The first series was aired between 5 July and 30 August 2009 and was hosted by Edsilia Rombley. She was first replaced by singer and actor Victor Reinier (2010, 2011) before Jan Smit became the permanent host in 2012. The show has 17 seasons, the most recent from 2024.

In each series, a number of well-known performers take turns as the central artist in the hot seat that gets honoured by the other artists by singing songs that are of significance to that person. It can be a cover of one of their own songs, a song that inspires the artist in the hot seat or something from their past. In earlier seasons, the central artist decided who had to sing which song, while in later seasons the artists could pick one from a list themselves. The artist in the hot seat ranks the performances and picks a favourite performance, which results in that person being the winner of the episode. The first six seasons also have a final episode, where they discuss and vote on their favourites. Later, the voting became less important and they stopped doing this. In season 10 they introduced a final episode where the artists sing duets. The show format has since been used in other European countries: Denmark, Norway, Sweden, Finland, Germany, Belgium, Lithuania, Estonia and Switzerland.

In July 2017, two compilations were broadcast in celebration of Beste Zangers' tenth anniversary.

== Summary ==
Season	Date of first broadcast	Date of last broadcast	Host	Location	Singers	Winners
1	5 July 2009	30 August 2009	Edsilia Rombley	Ibiza	Henk Westbroek; Gordon; Albert West; Danny de Munk; Nick Schilder; Simon Keizer; Thomas Berge	Simon Keizer
2	18 July 2010	16 September 2010	Victor Reinier	Ibiza	Frans Bauer; Frans Duijts; Jamai; Jan Dulles; Jeroen van der Boom; René Froger; Syb van der Ploeg	Jamai
3	19 March 2011	7 May 2011	Victor Reinier	Southern France	Xander de Buisonjé; Lange Frans; Wolter Kroes; Anita Meyer; Glennis Grace; Peter Koelewijn; George Baker; Do	Anita Meyer
4	2 May 2012	13 June 2012	Jan Smit	Ibiza	Gerard Joling; Ruth Jacott; Berget Lewis; Nikki Kerkhof; Peter Beense; Freek Bartels; Yes-R	Berget Lewis
5	5 January 2013	16 February 2013	Jan Smit	Ibiza	Simone Kleinsma; Charly Luske; Rob de Nijs; Angela Groothuizen; Tim Douwsma; Bastiaan Ragas; Raffaëla Paton	Raffaëla Paton
6	7 May 2014	2 July 2014	Jan Smit	Ibiza	Niels Geusebroek; Lisa Lois; Sabrina Starke; Jack Poels; Ben Saunders; Mattanja Joy Bradley; Leona Philippo; Dave von Raven	Sabrina Starke
7	28 September 2014	2 November 2014	Jan Smit	Ibiza	René Froger; André Hazes Jr.; Monique Klemann; Xander de Buisonjé; Carolina Dijkhuizen; Edsilia Rombley	André Hazes Jr.
8	13 June 2015	25 July 2015	Jan Smit	Ibiza	Jan Keizer; Anouk Maas; Frans Duijts; Lange Frans; Martin Buitenhuis; Julia Zahra; Do	Frans Duijts and Julia Zahra
9	21 May 2016	30 July 2016	Jan Smit	Ibiza	René van Kooten; Willeke Alberti; Brownie Dutch; Sharon Doorson; O'G3NE; Jeroen van der Boom	Willeke Alberti
10	20 May 2017	22 July 2017	Jan Smit	Ibiza	Anita Meyer; Brace; Kenny B; Maan; Tommie Christiaan; Tania Kross; Dennie Christian	Anita Meyer and Tania Kross
11	1 September 2018	27 October 2018	Jan Smit	Ibiza	Lee Towers; Trijntje Oosterhuis; Alain Clark; Tino Martin; Glen Faria; Maria Fiselier; Davina Michelle	Lee Towers and Trijntje Oosterhuis
12	24 August 2019	12 October 2019	Jan Smit	Ibiza	Emma Heesters; Floor Jansen; Henk Poort; Rolf Sanchez; Ruben Annink; Samantha Steenwijk; Tim Akkerman	Samantha Steenwijk and Rolf Sanchez
13	3 September 2020	29 October 2020	Nick & Simon	Ibiza	Diggy Dex; Milow; Miss Montreal; Stef Bos; Suzan & Freek; Tabitha; Wulf	Stef Bos
14	2 September 2021	28 October 2021	Jan Smit	Limburg	Alides Hidding; Anneke van Giersbergen; Belle Pérez; Bökkers; Joe Buck; Karsu; Roel van Velzen	Bökkers and Roel van Velzen
15	11 August 2022	29 September 2022	Jan Smit	Seville	Blanks; Claudia de Breij; Ferdi Bolland; Jaap Reesema; Nielson; Roxeanne Hazes; Sarita Lorena	Jaap Reesema en Nielson
16	2 September 2023	21 October 2023	Jan Smit	Seville	Douwe Bob; Duncan Laurence; Marco Bakker; MEAU; Melanie Jonk; Nick Schilder ^{(b)}; Numidia	
17	14 September 2024	2 November 2024	Jan Smit	Seville	Rikki Borgelt; Hannah Mae; Tangarine; Matthijn Buwalda; Karin Bloemen; SERA; Claude	
18	30 August 2025	18 October 2025	Jan Smit	Seville	Paul de Leeuw; Jacqueline Govaert; Acda en De Munnik; Typhoon; Bente; Snelle; Laetitia Gerards	

== Season 1 (2009) ==
The first season the series broadcast from 5 July 2009 to 30 August 2009, and hosted by Edsilia Rombley. Seven Dutch artists (Henk Westbroek, Gordon, Albert West, Danny de Munk, Nick Schilder, Simon Keizer and Thomas Berge) sang songs from each other's repertoire. The episodes were recorded in four days on Ibiza, accompanied by a live band playing the songs.

Episode 1 - Henk Westbroek

Song	Singer	Original from
"Vriendschap"	Nick Schilder	Het Goede Doel (where Westbroek was part of a duo)
"Iedereen is van de wereld"	Gordon	The Scene
"België (Is er leven op Pluto?)"	Danny de Munk	Het Goede Doel
Nooduitgang"	Albert West	Het Goede Doel
"Kronenburg park"	Simon Keizer	Frank Boeijen
"Zelfs je naam is mooi"	Thomas Berge	Henk Westbroek

Winner: Albert West

Episode 2 - Simon Keizer

Song	Singer	Original from
"Pak maar mijn hand"	Gordon	Nick & Simon (where Simon Keizer was one half of the duo)
"Everything"	Nick Schilder	Michael Bublé
"Hoe lang"	Thomas Berge	Nick & Simon
"Sitting, Waiting, Wishing"	Henk Westbroek	Jack Johnson
"Kijk omhoog"	Danny de Munk	Nick & Simon
"De dag dat alles beter is"	Albert West	Nick & Simon

Winner: Danny de Munk

Episode 3 - Danny de Munk

Song	Singer	Original from
"Mijn stad"	Simon Keizer	Danny de Munk
"Bloemetje"	Albert West	Danny de Munk
Hard to Handle"	Nick Schilder	Otis Redding
"Ik voel me zo verdomd alleen"	Thomas Berge	Danny de Munk
"Hart en ziel"	Henk Westbroek	Danny de Munk
"Vrienden voor het leven"	Gordon	Danny de Munk

Winner: Nick Schilder

Episode 4 - Gordon

Song	Singer	Original from
"Ik hou van jou"	Albert West	Maribelle
"Never nooit meer"	Simon Keizer	Gordon
"Hallelujah"	Nick Schilder	Leonard Cohen
"Kon ik maar even bij je zijn"	Thomas Berge	Gordon
"Shine"	Danny de Munk	De Toppers (where Gordon Heuckeroth was formerly a member)
"Omdat ik zo van je hou"	Henk Westbroek	Gordon

Winner: Nick Schilder

Episode 5 - Thomas Berge

Song	Singer	Original from
"Jij bent mijn leven"	Albert West	Thomas Berge
Viva la Vida	Simon Keizer	Coldplay
"Zonder jou"	Danny de Munk	Thomas Berge
"Ieder moment"	Henk Westbroek	Thomas Berge
"Angels"	Gordon	Robbie Williams
"Everybody's Changing"	Nick Schilder	Keane

Winner: Henk Westbroek

Episode 6 - Albert West

Song	Singer	Original from
"Is This the Way to Amarillo"	Danny de Munk (with Albert West)	Neil Sedaka
Put Your Head on My Shoulder	Gordon	Paul Anka
"Cha La La I Need You"	Nick Schilder	The Shuffles
"Ginny Come Lately"	Henk Westbroek	Albert West
"Look at Me"	Simon Keizer	Buddy Holly
"Words"	Thomas Berge	Bee Gees

Winner: Thomas Berge

Episode 7 - Nick Schilder

Song	Singer	Original from
"Steeds weer"	Henk Westbroek	Nick & Simon
"Wonderful World"	Simon Keizer	James Morrison
"Op een onbewoond eiland"	Albert West	Kinderen Voor Kinderen
I Knew You Were Waiting"	Gordon (with Edsilia Rombley)	George Michael and Aretha Franklin
"Rosanne"	Danny de Munk (with Simon Keizer)	Nick & Simon
"De soldaat"	Thomas Berge	Nick & Simon

Winner - Henk Westbroek

Episode 8

In the final episode, the singers are asked to look back at their performances. In addition, they are allowed to choose another eventual replacement and give him/her an extra point. This showed that Simon Keizer was the eventual overall winner of the program by 2 extra points.

== Season 2 (2010) ==
The second season was broadcast from 18 July 2010 to 16 September 2010 and hosted by Victor Reinier. Seven Dutch artists (Frans Bauer, Frans Duijts, Jamai, Jan Dulles, Jeroen van der Boom, René Froger and Syb van der Ploeg) sang songs from each other's repertoire. The episodes were recorded in Ibiza, accompanied by a live band playing the songs.

Episode 1 - Jeroen van der Boom

Song	Singer	Original from
"Betekenis"	Jan Dulles	Jeroen van der Boom
"Knockin' on Heaven's Door"	Frans Bauer	Bob Dylan
"Eén wereld"	Jamai Loman	Jeroen van der Boom
"Jij bent zo" (in West Frisian)	Syb van der Ploeg	Jeroen van der Boom
"Het is over"	Frans Duijts (with Jeroen van der Boom)	Jeroen van der Boom
"Amor de mis amores" / "Laat me"	René Froger	Paco / Ramses Shaffy

Winner: Frans Duijts

Episode 2 - Jamai Loman

Song	Singer	Original from
"Step Right Up"	Frans Bauer	Jamai Loman
"Circle of Life"	Jeroen van der Boom	Elton John
"The Show Must Go On"	Syb van der Ploeg	Queen
"Freedom"	Jan Dulles	Wham! / George Michael
"Suspicious Minds"	Frans Duijts	Mark James; Elvis Presley
"God Only Knows"	René Froger	The Beach Boys

Winner: Syb van der Ploeg

Episode 3 - René Froger

Song	Singer	Original from
"Why Are You So Beautiful"	Jeroen van der Boom	René Froger
"Alles kan een mens gelukkig maken"	Syb van der Ploeg	René Froger
"This Is the Moment"	Jan Dulles	René Froger
"Nobody Else"	Jamai Loman	René Froger
"Just Say Hello"	Frans Duijts	René Froger
"Winter in America"	Frans Bauer	René Froger

Winner: Jan Dulles

Episode 4 - Syb van der Ploeg

Song	Singer	Original from
Raak	Jeroen van der Boom	De Kast (Syb van der Ploeg was part of the band)
"Als ik jou zie"	René Froger	Syb van der Ploeg
"Hart van mijn gevoel"	Jan Dulles	De Kast
"In de wolken"	Jamai Loman	De Kast
"In nije dei" (with Syb van der Ploeg)	Frans Duijts	De Kast
"Woorden zonder woorden"	Frans Bauer	De Kast

Winner - Jan Dulles

Episode 5 - Jan Dulles

Song	Singer	Original from
Bevlogen als vogels	René Froger	3JS
De zomer voorbij	Frans Duijts	3JS
Watermensen	Jeroen van der Boom	3JS
Geloven in het leven	Syb van der Ploeg	3JS
Make it mine	Jamai Loman	Jason Mraz
Wiegelied	Frans Bauer	3JS

Winner: Jeroen van der Boom

Episode 6 - Frans Duijts

Song	Singer	Original from
"Jij denkt maar dat je alles mag van mij"	Syb van der Ploeg	Frans Duijts
"Green Green Grass of Home"	Jan Dulles	Tom Jones
"Ik mis je"	René Froger	Frans Duijts
"Dochters"	Jamai Loman	Marco Borsato
"Lieveling"	Frans Bauer	Frans Duijts
"Don't Let the Sun Go Down on Me"	Jeroen van der Boom & René Froger	Elton John & George Michael

Winner - René Froger

Episode 7 - Frans Bauer

Song	Singer	Original from
"Als sterren aan de hemel staan"	Jamai Loman	Frans Bauer
"Heb je even voor mij"	Frans Duijts	Frans Bauer
"I Feel Good"	Jan Dulles	James Brown
"Samen in een Bubbelbad"	Jeroen van der Boom	Frans Bauer
"Hotel California"	Syb van der Ploeg	The Eagles
"Dag uit duizend dromen"	René Froger	Frans Bauer

Winner - René Froger

Episode 8 - Final

the final episode was a look back at previous performances to decide on an overall winner for the second season.

Favorite of	Sung Song	Sung by	Original
Frans Duijts	"Ik mis je"	René Froger	Frans Duijts
Jeroen van der Boom	"Het is over"	Frans Duijts	Jeroen van der Boom
Jan Dulles	"Eén wereld"	Jamai Loman	Jeroen van der Boom
Jamai Loman	"Watermensen"	Jeroen van der Boom	3JS
René Froger	"Knockin' on Heaven's Door"	Frans Bauer	Bob Dylan
Syb van der Ploeg	"Hart van mijn gevoel"	Jan Dulles	De Kast
Frans Bauer	"The Show Must Go On"	Syb van der Ploeg	Queen

Who voted for whom

Artist	Voted for
Frans Duijts	Jan Dulles
Jeroen van der Boom	Jamai Loman
Jan Dulles	Jamai Loman
Jamai Loman	Jeroen van der Boom
René Froger	Jeroen van der Boom
Syb van der Ploeg	Jan Dulles
Frans Bauer	Jamai Loman

Number of votes

Artist	Number of votes
Jamai Loman	3
Jan Dulles	2
Jeroen van der Boom	2

Overall Winner: Jamai Loman

== Season 3 (2011) ==
The third season ran from 19 March 2011 to 7 May 2011 and was hosted for a second year in a row by Victor Reinier. 2011 participating artists were Xander de Buisonjé, Lange Frans, Wolter Kroes, Anita Meyer, Glennis Grace, Peter Koelewijn, George Baker and the singer Do.

Episode 1 - Peter Koelewijn

Song	Singer	Original from
"Je wordt ouder pappa"	Xander de Buisonjé	Peter Koelewijn
"Mij oh mij"	George Baker	Peter Koelewijn
"Sprong in het duister"	Anita Meyer	Peter Koelewijn
"Marijke"	Do	Peter Koelewijn
"Angeline"	Lange Frans	Peter Koelewijn
"Alice"	Glennis Grace	Peter Koelewijn
"Kom van dat dak af!"	Wolter Kroes	Peter Koelewijn

Winner: Xander de Buisonjé

Episode 2 - Xander de Buisonjé

Song	Singer	Original from
"Ik vlieg ik zweef"	Do	Xander de Buisonjé
"Hou me vast"	Wolter Kroes	Volumia! (where Xander de Buisonjé was a vocalist)
"Blijf bij mij"	Lange Frans	Volumia!
"Jij"	Peter Koelewijn	Xander de Buisonjé
"Ik kan het niet alleen"	George Baker	De Dijk
"Afscheid"	Glennis Grace	Volumia!
"Het is over"	Anita Meyer	Volumia!

Winner: Glennis Grace

Episode 3 - Anita Meyer

Song	Singer	Original from
"Run to Me"	Peter Koelewijn	Anita Meyer and Lee Towers
"You Can Do It"	Do	Anita Meyer
"The Alternative Way"	Wolter Kroes	Anita Meyer
"Crazy"	George Baker	Patsy Cline
"They Don't Play Our Love Song"	Glennis Grace	Anita Meyer
"Why Tell Me Why"	Lange Frans	Anita Meyer
"We've Got Tonight"	Xander de Buisonjé met Anita Meyer	Anita Meyer and Lee Towers

Winner: Lange Frans

Episode 4 - Do

Song	Singer	Original from
"Beautiful Thing	Lange Frans	Do
"One Night With You"	George Baker	Elvis Presley
"Voorbij"	Wolter Kroes	Do and Marco Borsato
"I Will"	Glennis Grace	Do
"Ik wil jou"	Xander de Buisonjé	Polle Eduard
"Angel by My Side"	Anita Meyer	Do
"Heaven"	Peter Koelewijn	Bryan Adams covered by Do

Winner: Glennis Grace

Episode 5 - Lange Frans

Song	Singer	Original from
"Me Boy"	Wolter Kroes	Lange Frans (with Ali B and Yes-R)
"Sex Bomb"	George Baker	Tom Jones
"Het land van.."	Glennis Grace	Lange Frans and Baas B
"Daughters"	Do	John Mayer
"Zinloos"	Xander de Buisonjé (duet with Lange Frans)	Lange Frans & Baas B
"Mee naar Diemen-Zuid"	Peter Koelewijn	Lange Frans & Baas B
"Zing voor me"	Anita Meyer (duet met Lange Frans)	Lange Frans and Thé Lau

Winner: Peter Koelewijn

Episode 6 - George Baker

Song	Singer	Original from
"Baby Blue"	Do	George Baker Selection (band of George Baker)
"Paloma Blanca"	Wolter Kroes	George Baker Selection
"Song of Love"	Anita Meyer	George Baker Selection
"Drink Drink Drink	Lange Frans	George Baker Selection
"Santa Lucia by Night"	Xander de Buisonjé	George Baker Selection
"Morning Sky"	Peter Koelewijn	George Baker Selection
"Little Green Bag"	Glennis Grace	George Baker Selection

Winner: Anita Meyer

Episode 7 - Wolter Kroes

Song	Singer	Original from
"Groener Gras"	Xander de Buisonjé	Wolter Kroes
"Heerlijke dag"	Anita Meyer	Wolter Kroes
"Ik heb de hele nacht liggen dromen"	Lange Frans	Wolter Kroes
"Desperado"	George Baker	The Eagles
"Zij gelooft in mij"	Do	André Hazes
"Illumina"	Glennis Grace	Yvette Sangalo
"Viva Hollandia"	Peter Koelewijn	Wolter Kroes

Winner: Do

Episode 8 - Glennis Grace

Song	Singer	Original from
"Window of Hope"	Anita Meyer	Oleta Adams
"One Moment in Time"	Peter Koelewijn	Whitney Houston
"Need Your Love So Bad"	George Baker	Little Willie John
"Als je slaapt"	Xander de Buisonjé	Glennis Grace
"Dansen met het leven"	Wolter Kroes	Glennis Grace
"Empire State of Mind"	Lange Frans (duet with Glennis Grace)	Jay-Z feat. Alicia Keys
"Engel zonder vleugels"	Do	Glennis Grace

Winner: Xander de Buisonjé

Episode 9 - Final

Participants look back at the performances and nominate their overall favorites and give points

Favorite of	Song	Singer	Original from
Glennis Grace	"Als je slaapt"	Xander de Buisonjé	Glennis Grace
Wolter Kroes	"Zing voor me	Anita Meyer & Lange Frans	Lange Frans & Thé Lau
Xander de Buisonjé	"Afscheid"	Glennis Grace	Volumia!
George Baker	"Daughters"	Do	John Mayer
Do	"Why Tell Me Why"	Lange Frans & Anita Meyer)	Anita Meyer
Peter Koelewijn	"Beautiful Thing"	Lange Frans	Do
Lange Frans	"Zij gelooft in mij"	Do	André Hazes

Who voted for whom

Artist	Voted for
Glennis Grace	Xander de Buisonjé
Wolter Kroes	Anita Meyer
Xander de Buisonjé	Glennis Grace
Do	Anita Meyer
Peter Koelewijn	Glennis Grace
Anita Mayer	Xander de Buisonjé
Lange Frans	Anita Meyer

Number of votes

Artist	Number of votes
Anita Meyer	3
Xander de Buisonjé	2
Glennis Grace	2
Do	1

Overall Winner: Anita Meyer

== Season 4 (2012) ==
The fourth season was broadcast from 2 May 2012 to 13 June 2012. Jan Smit took over as the host. The participating Dutch artists for the fourth season were Gerard Joling, Ruth Jacott, Berget Lewis, Nikki Kerkhof, Peter Beense, Freek Bartels and Yes-R.

Episode 1 - Gerard Joling

Song	Singer	Original from
"Ik hou d'r zo van"	Ruth Jacott	Gerard Joling
"Love Is in Your Eyes"	Peter Beense	Gerard Joling
"Ticket to the Tropics"	Berget Lewis	Gerard Joling
"Maak me gek"	Yes-R	Gerard Joling
"Zing met me mee"	Nikki Kerkhof	Gerard Joling
"Shangri-la"	Freek Bartels	Gerard Joling

Winner: Berget Lewis

Episode 2 - Ruth Jacott

Song	Singer	Original from
Kippevel	Berget Lewis	Ruth Jacott
Hou Me Vast	Freek Bartels	Ruth Jacott
Rad van Fortuin	Peter Beense	Ruth Jacott
Leun op Mij	Nikki Kerkhof	Ruth Jacott
Hartslag	Yes-R	Ruth Jacott
Vrede	Gerard Joling	Ruth Jacott

Winner: Yes-R

Episode 3 - Yes-R

Song	Singer	Original from
Ghetto	Nikki Kerkhof	Yes-R
Vecht Mee	Gerard Joling	Yes-R
Black or White	Freek Bartels & Yes-R	Michael Jackson
Als de Nacht Valt	Berget Lewis & Yes-R	Yes-R
Killing Me Softly	Ruth Jacott	Roberta Flack
Uit Elkaar	Peter Beense	Yes-R

Winner: Nikki Kerkhof

Episode 4 - Freek Bartels

Song	Singer	Original from
The Impossible Dream (The Quest)	Gerard Joling	Man of La Mancha
Somewhere over the Rainbow	Nikki Kerkhof	The Wizard of Oz
Miss Celie's Blues	Ruth jacott	The Color Purple
Lighters	Yes-R & Freek Bartels	Eminem & Bruno Mars
You'll Never Walk Alone	Peter Beense	Carousel
And I Am Telling You	Berget Lewis	Dreamgirls

Winner: Berget Lewis

Episode 5 - Berget Lewis

Song	Singer	Original from
Sooner or later	Yes-R	Berget Lewis
The One and Only	Gerard Joling	Gladys Knight & the Pips
Endless Love	Freek Bartels (duet with Berget Lewis)	Diana Ross & Lionel Richie
Natural Woman	Ruth Jacott	Aretha Franklin
Love on the Rocks	Peter Beense	Neil Diamond
Somebody else's lover	Nikki Kerkhof	Total Touch

Winner: Peter Beense

Episode 6 - Peter Beense

Song	Singer	Original from
Laat ze maar lullen	Nikki Kerkhof	Peter Beense
Geef mij jouw lach	Berget Lewis	Peter Beense
Ik leef m'n eigen leven	Freek Bartels	André Hazes
Ik mis je zo	Ruth Jacott	Will Tura
Ik zou het willen schreeuwen van de toren	Yes-R	Peter Beense
Waarom	Gerard Joling	André Hazes

Winner: Berget Lewis

Episode 7 - Nikki Kerkhof

Song	Singer	Original from
Bring Me Down	Ruth Jacott	Nikki Kerkhof
Paradise By The Dashboardlight	Peter Beense & Nikki Kerhof	Meat Loaf & Ellen Foley
What Did I Do	Yes-R	Nikki Kerkhof
Unchained Melody	Gerard Joling	The Righteous Brothers
Zwart Wit	Berget Lewis	Frank Boeijen Groep
How To Break A Heart	Freek Bartels	Nikki Kerkhof

Winner: Berget Lewis

Episode 8 - Final

The participants look back at earlier performances and nominate for best singer overall giving points

Favorite of	Song	Singer	Original from
Freek Bartels	"Ik hou d'r zo van"	Ruth Jacott	Gerard Joling
Berget Lewis	"Ghetto"	Nikki	Akon
Peter Beense	"Lighters"	Yes-R and Freek Bartels	Bruno Mars & Bad Meets Evil
Gerard Joling	"Love Is in Your Eyes"	Peter Beense	Gerard Joling
Yes-R	"Waarom"	Gerard Joling	André Hazes
Ruth Jacott	"Hou me vast"	Freek Bartels	Ruth Jacott
Nikki Kerkhof	"Ticket to the Tropics"	Berget Lewis	Gerard Joling

Who voted for who?

Artist	Voted for
Freek Bartels	Berget Lewis
Berget Lewis	Freek Bartels
Peter Beense	Berget Lewis
Gerard Joling	Berget Lewis
Yes-R	Berget Lewis
Ruth Jacott	Berget Lewis
Nikki Kerkhof	Berget Lewis

Number of votes:

Artist	Number of votes
Berget Lewis	6
Freek Bartels	1

Overall Winner: Berget Lewis

== Season 5 (2013) ==
The fifth season featured Simone Kleinsma, Charly Luske, Rob de Nijs, Angela Groothuizen, Tim Douwsma, Bastiaan Ragas and Raffaëla Paton.

Episode 1 - Raffaëla Paton

Song	Singer	Original from
Chocolatte	Tim Douwsma	Raffaëla Paton
You Are Always on My Mind	Rob de Nijs	Elvis Presley
Houten Hart	Charly Luske and Rafaëlla Paton	De Poema's - as performed by Paul de Leeuw and Rafaëlla Paton
For Once in My Life	Simone Kleinsma	Stevie Wonder
Right Here, Right Now	Bastiaan Ragas	Raffaëlla Paton
Private Dancer	Angela Groothuizen	Tina Turner

Winner: Rob de Nijs

Episode 2 - Charly Luske

Song	Singer	Original from
Meant to Be	Raffaëla Paton	Charly Luske
Wat is Mijn Hart	Simone Kleinsma	Marco Borsato
Driving Me Crazy	Tim Douwsma with Bastiaan Ragas and Charly Luske	Boy Band; Charly Luske played one of the main roles in this musical
Can't Help Falling in Love	Rob de Nijs	Elvis Presley
I Won't Give Up	Angela Groothuizen with Charly Luske	Jason Mraz
Home	Bastiaan Ragas	Michael Bublé

Winner: Raffaëla Paton

Episode 3 - Bastiaan Ragas

Song	Singer	Original from
Duizend Manieren	Raffaëlla Paton	Bastiaan Ragas
De Helft Is van Mij	Angela Groothuizen	Bastiaan Ragas
You Are So Beautiful	Charly Luske	Joe Cocker
Lady Madonna	Rob de Nijs	The Beatles
De Hemel Is Dichtbij	Simone Kleinsma	Bastiaan Ragas
It Wetter (Het Water translated into Frisian)	Tim Douwsma	Marco Borsato

Winner: Simone Kleinsma

Episode 4 - Angela Groothuizen

Song	Singer	Original from
Do Wah Diddy Diddy	Charly Luske	Dolly Dots (where Angela Groothuizen was a member)
Ik Hou Van Dit Land	Raffaëlla Paton	Angela Groothuizen
Overblijf	Bastiaan Ragas	Angela Groothuizen
Ik Meen Het (Both in English and Dutch, All I Ever Need Is You)	Simone Kleinsma	André Hazes
She	Rob de Nijs	Charles Aznavour
Love Me Just a Little Bit More	Tim Douwsma	Dolly Dots

Winner: Raffaëlla Paton

Episode 5 - Simone Kleinsma

Song	Singer	Original from
Omarm Me	Angela Groothuizen	BLØF
I Will Follow Him (In a mashup with I Follow Rivers from Lykke Li)	Raffaëlla Paton	Sister Act; Simone Kleinsma played Mother Superior in the Dutch musical
Nooit Gedacht	Rob de Nijs with Simone Kleinsma	Simone Kleinsma and Rob de Nijs
Als De Morgen Is Gekomen	Tim Douwsma with Jan Smit	Jan Smit
Zonder Jou	Bastiaan Ragas with Simone Kleinsma	Simone Kleinsma and Paul de Leeuw
The Winner Takes It All; With Viva la Vida from Coldplay mixed in	Charly Luske	ABBA

Winner: Angela Groothuizen

Episode 6 - Tim Douwsma

Song	Singer	Original from
Jij Bent De Hemel	Simone Kleinsma	Tim Douwsma
Hold On, I'm Comin'	Charly Luske	Sam & Dave
Toen Ik Je Zag	Angela Groothuizen	Antonie Kamerling
Whole Lotta Shakin' Goin' On	Bastiaan Ragas	Elvis Presley
Something	Rob de Nijs	The Beatles
Summer Nights (Tim Douwsma released this song in Dutch as Allebei)	Raffaëlla Paton	Rascal Flatts

Winner: Charly Luske

Episode 7 - Rob de Nijs

Song	Singer	Original from
Malle Babbe	Bastiaan Ragas	Rob de Nijs
Het Werd Zomer	Charly Luske	Rob de Nijs
Jan Klaassen De Trompetter	Angela Groothuizen	Rob de Nijs
Foto Van Vroeger	Simone Kleinsma	Rob de Nijs
Ritme Van De Regen partially in English, Rhythm of the Rain	Raffaëlla Paton	Rob de Nijs
Zondag	Tim Douwsma	Rob de Nijs

Winner: Rafaëlla Paton

Episode 8 - Final

Who voted for whom

Artist	Voted for
Angela Groothuizen	Rafaëlla Paton
Rafaëlla Paton	Rob de Nijs
Simone Kleinsma	Rafaëlla Paton
Tim Douwsma	Charly Luske
Bastiaan Ragas	Rob de Nijs
Charly Luske	Rafaëlla Paton
Rob de Nijs	Rafaëlla Paton

Number of votes

Artist	Number of votes
Rafaëlla Paton	4
Rob de Nijs	2
Charly Luske	1

Overall Winner: Rafaëlla Paton

== Season 6 (Spring 2014) ==
Niels Geusebroek, Lisa Lois, Sabrina Starke, Jack Poels, Ben Saunders, Mattanja Joy Bradley, Leona Philippo and Dave von Raven, with Sabrina Starke winning the series.

== Season 7 (Winter 2014) ==
René Froger, André Hazes Jr., Monique Klemann, Xander de Buisonjé, Carolina Dijkhuizen and Edsilia Rombley took part with André Hazes Jr. winning the series.

== Season 8 (2015) ==
Jan Keizer, Anouk Maas, Frans Duijts, Lange Frans, Martin Buitenhuis, Julia Zahra and Do took part in the series. Frans Duijts and Julia Zahra were joint winners.

== Season 9 (2016) ==
René van Kooten, Willeke Alberti, Brownie Dutch, Sharon Doorson, O'G3NE and Jeroen van der Boom took part with Willeke Alberti winning the season.

== Season 10 (2017) ==
Anita Meyer, Brace, Kenny B, Maan, Tommie Christiaan, Tania Kross and Dennie Christian took part in the series. Anita Meyer and Tania Kross jointly won the series

== Season 11 (2018) ==
Lee Towers, Trijntje Oosterhuis, Alain Clark, Tino Martin, Glen Faria, Maria Fiselier and Davina Michelle took part. Lee Towers and Trijntje Oosterhuis jointly won the series.

	Episode 1		Episode 2		Episode 3		Episode 4		Episode 5		Episode 6		Episode 7		Episode 8 - Duets	
Lee Towers			What you won't do for love	5	Jij liet me vallen	1	What about us	3	Je best doen	1	If I were a rich man	3	Back in my world	6	Don't go breaking my heart, with Davina	6
Trijntje Oosterhuis	The first time ever I saw your face	2			Kom maar bij mij	5	Ordinary people	4	Something inside so strong	2	Zeg me wie je ziet	4	Onze vriendschap	5	Guilty, with Alain	7
Tino Martin	It's raining in my heart	1	I'll say goodbye	1			I'm the one	1	Zij weet het	3	O mio babbino caro	5	Hoe zeg ik jou	3	Laat me leven/Il mondo, with Maria	1
Davina Michelle	You'll never walk alone	4	Come with me	4	At this moment	2			Duurt te lang	6	Habanera	1	Head over heels	4	Voorbje, with Tino	4
Glen Faria	The living years	6	Als ik je laat gaan	2	Dak ik je zo zou missen	4	Relove	5			Amsterdam	6	This ain't gonna work	1	Imagine, with Trijntje	3
Maria Fiselier	Anak	3	La mer	3	Il mondo	3	Lose Yourself	6	P.Y.T.	4			Hard to Handle	2	Perfect symphony, with Alain	5
Alain Clark	Daddy don't cry	5	Touch me there	6	Het is goed zo	6	De Waarheid	2	Blowin' in the Wind	5	Will You Be There	2			The Lady Is a Tramp, with Lee	2

== Season 12 (2019) ==
After having started hosting the show since season 4 in 2012, this 12th series became the last consecutive to be hosted by the singer Jan Smith until his return in 2021. Smith hosted for a total of 9 consecutive seasons in a span of 8 years. The singers taking part were Emma Heesters, Floor Jansen, Henk Poort, Rolf Sanchez, Ruben Annink, Samantha Steenwijk and Tim Akkerman. Rolf Sanchez and Samantha Steenwijk were the joint winners for the season.

	Episode 1		Episode 2		Episode 3		Episode 4		Episode 5		Episode 6		Episode 7		Episode 8 - Duets	
Henk Poort			Wees zuinig op m'n meissie	2	Noelia	4	The Sound of Silence	6	Your man	6	Despacito	1	Vincent	2	Vivo Per Lei, with Emma	2
Samantha Steenwijk	Het geeft niet / Mi Manchi	6			Zonder Jou	6	Ik ben altijd dicht bij jou	5	Dat ik op je wacht	5	Geloof in jezelf	5	Just The Way I Do	1	Cose Della Vita, with Tim	3
Rolf Sanchez	Een Barkie	5	Solo otra vez	6			Hotel California	4	On and On	4	Así es que debe ser	4	The River	5	No Me Ames, with Samantha	6
Floor Jansen	Vilja lied	1	Mama	3	Qué Se Siente	5			About love I don’t know a thing	3	Shallow	6	Winner	6	The Phantom of the Opera, with Henk	7
Ruben Annink	La Donna è Mobile	3	Ga maar door	5	Hoe is Hij	2	They Dance Alone	2			Can't Help Falling in Love	2	I'm Still Alive	4	De Kapitein Deel II, with Tim	1
Emma Heesters	Sex Machine	2	Liefde voor Altijd	1	El Universo	1	Strong	3	Wie je was	1			Inside My Head	3	Pa Olvidarte, with Rolf	4
Tim Akkerman	Breng hem thuis	4	Breng hem thuis	4	Por Si No Te Vuelvo a Ver	3	Nemo	1	My Girl	2	Let Me Love You	3			Shallow, with Floor	5

== Season 13 (2020) ==
New hosts Nick & Simon took over hosting for Jan Smit, as he had been sick during filming this season. The participating singers are: Diggy Dex, Milow, Sanne Hans known as Miss Montreal, Stef Bos, Suzan & Freek, Tabitha and Wulf. Stef Bos was the winner of the season.

	Episode 1		Episode 2		Episode 3		Episode 4		Episode 5		Episode 6		Episode 7		Episode 8 - Duets	
Suzan & Freek			Straks is het te laat	5	Butterflies instead	5	Het spijt me niet	1	Papa	1	Het geeft niet	3	De helft van wat je doet	5	Hou vol hou vast, with Tabitha	1
Diggy Dex	Verdwaal met mij	3			Los bij elkaar	4	Mooi zoals je bent	6	Later als ik dood ben	5	Ergens daarboven	5	Nieuwe Dag	4	Lampedusa, with Suzan & Freek	5
Miss Montreal	Bij allebei	1	Viervoeters	2			Hey Mam	5	Door de wind	2	Lightning crashes	2	Anyone's Daughter	2	Have you ever seen the rain with Milow	4
Tabitha	Hemingway	5	Verloren	4	Ik hou van mij	2			My land is jou land	3	Michael Jordan	6	Summer on you	1	Best part of me, with Milow	6
Stef Bos	Lied voor niemand anders	6	Sterren tellen	3	Recht uit het hart	3	Te groot voor het servet	2			Ik zie u graag (The Kingdom)	4	Les geleerd	3	Laat me, with Miss Montreal	7
Milow	When the sun goes down	2	Morgen komt het goed	6	Giving up on you	1	Redemption Song	4	Is dit nu later	5			Regarde le soleil	6	Jij blijft, with Diggy Dex	2
Wulf	No more rain	4	La vie est belle	1	Till the sun comes up	6	Never nooit meer	3	Over de muur	4	Greatest Expectations	1			Señorita, with Tabitha	3

== Season 14 (2021) ==
Jan Smit returned as host after being sick during the previous season. This is the first season since season 3 to not be hosted in Ibiza, due to the ongoing COVID-19 pandemic. Instead, it was hosted in Limburg. The participating singers are: Roel van Velzen, Bökkers, Belle Perez, Alides Hidding, Karsu, Joe Buck, and Anneke van Giersbergen. The winners of the season were Bökkers and Roel van Velzen.

	Episode 1		Episode 2		Episode 3		Episode 4		Episode 5		Episode 6		Episode 7		Episode 8 - Duets	
Roel van Velzen			Meer is niet meer	4	Granada	2	Listen to the man with the golden voice	4	A mi manera	5	Ver hier vandaan	6	I feel alive	6	Hou van mij, with Anneke	4
Bökkers	Hou van mij	6			Nothing really matters	6	Carry on	2	Dat dach ik dus nie	6	Denk ik an oe	4	Zo lief	3	Miracles, with Karsu	2
Belle Perez	Love of my life	2	Here comes the sun	2			Specialized in you	1	A mi manera	4	Denk ik an oe	5	Strange machines	2	Rewrite the stars, with Joe	3
Alides Hidding	When summer ends	4	Sien woman sparrow is weet'n	3	Que viva la vida	1			Under loving wings	2	The way you take time	1	My mother said	1	When the rain begins to fall, with Belle	1
Karsu	Song for Furaha	5	An de kant	1	Hijo de la luna	4	Hollywood seven	3			From this moment	2	Losing you	5	Je suis malade, with Belle	5
Joe Buck	Baby get higher	1	Miracles	6	Hello World	3	Rain of Happiness	5	Wonderful Life	3			Sometimes it snows in April	4	Don't stop me now, with Roel	7
Anneke van Giersbergen	Sing sing sing	3	Kaaw bloed	5	Sobreviviré	5	Endless road	6	Jest Oldu	1	White roses	3			What kind of fool, with Alides	6

== Season 15 (2022) ==
This season took place in Seville, Spain. The cast includes: Blanks, Claudia de Breij, Ferdi Bolland, Jaap Reesema, Nielson, Roxeanne Hazes, and Sarita Lorena.

	Episode 1		Episode 2		Episode 3		Episode 4		Episode 5		Episode 6	Episode 7	Episode 8 - Duets
Roxeanne Hazes			Vannacht	4	Ik drink	3	IJskoud	1	Ooit komt nooit meer	2			
Blanks	Amor, amor, amor	4			Now I know what love is	1	One in a million	3	It'll be fine	6			
Claudia de Breij	In mijn bloed	3	Det het beter kon	1			Zonlicht op je schouders	5	Jasje van goud	4			
Nielson	Kapot	1	Spelregels	6	Recht m'n ziel in	6			Ze heeft me lief	5			
Jaap Reesema	Ik was toch je meisje	6	Ik hoor alleen bij jou	3	Deze armen	4	Grijs	4					
Sarita Lorena	Vreemde voor mij	2	Dance alone	2	Mag ik dan bij jou	5	Deze is voor jou	2	Nu wij niet meer praten	1			
Ferdi Bolland	Lost	5	Except for you	5	At seventeen	2	Sexy als ik dans	6	Tears in Heaven	3			

== See also ==
- The Best Singers (series)
