= Blanks (musician) =

Dutch musician (born 1997)

- Born: Simon de Wit; 19 April 1997 (age 29); Vleuten-De Meern, Netherlands
- Genres: Pop; Indie
- Occupations: artist; songwriter; record producer
- Years active: 2013–present
- Label: Excited About Music
- Website: https://www.musicbyblanks.com

YouTube information
- Channel: Music by Blanks
- Genre: Music

Simon de Wit (born 19 April 1997), known professionally as Blanks, is a Dutch musician, songwriter and record producer. Alongside his own releases, he writes and produces for a number of Dutch and international artists. He is also a co-owner of the independent label Excited About Music, which releases his work as well as music by artists such as Meau, Jet van der Steen, and Isabel van Gelder.

Beginning his music career as a YouTuber, he created the channel Music by Blanks in 2013. His remakes of Bazzi's "Mine" and Post Malone's "Better Now" went viral in 2018 and became his breakthrough.

== Early life and education ==
De Wit grew up in the province of Groningen. He began taking guitar lessons around the age of twelve, later adding vocal and piano training. He taught himself filming, editing, songwriting and music production through YouTube tutorials. He attended the Parcival College for secondary school, and during that time started creating YouTube videos, which eventually developed into an international career on the platform. He later studied Information Science (BSc and MSc) at the University of Groningen, where he continued developing as a songwriter and music producer.

== Career ==
=== Early career ===
De Wit began uploading videos to YouTube in 2013. Under the name Music by Blanks, he developed several recurring concepts for his channel, including the One Hour Song Challenge, Style Swaps, Story Sessions and Blanks Invites. His 1980s-style remake of Post Malone's Better Now reached millions of views and received international attention across social media platforms. At the request of DJ Armin van Buuren, he created a Beatles-style version of Blah Blah Blah. Through his Story Sessions, he involved his fanbase directly in the music-writing process, allowing fans from around the world to follow and influence the creation of new songs.

In Blanks Invites, he wrote songs together with other artists while filming the full process. Guests included Sheppard, Alfie Templeman, Dayglow, San Holo and Benny Sings. His YouTube channel eventually grew to over one million subscribers.

In 2016, De Wit participated in Giels Talentenjacht, a Dutch talent competition that challenged emerging artists to write original songs. Out of more than a thousand applicants, his then-band reached the final 25.

=== Blanks ===
Since 2019, Blanks has released his own music. His style blends indie pop with retro influences and an optimistic, melodic sound. His debut single Don't Stop was playlisted by NPO Radio 2, and in July 2019, his follow-up single Wave was named 3FM Megahit, with Blanks selected as 3FM Talent. For 3FM Serious Request in December 2019, he wrote the theme song Everything's Changing.

In January 2020, Blanks was named Best Artist at Popgala Noord, organized by Eurosonic Noorderslag. His planned U.S. tour was cancelled after one show due to the global COVID-19 pandemic.

His single What You Do to Me was released on 12 February 2021 and chosen as Harde Schijf ("Hard Record") by Radio 538. His debut album Nothing Lasts Forever and That's OK followed in October 2021.

In January 2022, he performed at Eurosonic Noorderslag and won the Music Moves Europe Award (formerly EBBA). That same month, his song OK to Cry from his album was named 3FM Megahit. During the summer of 2022 he played several festivals, including Paaspop and Concert at Sea, and later that year toured the United States with St. Lucia. He also appeared in season fifteen of the TV show Beste Zangers.

In January 2023, Blanks returned to Eurosonic Noorderslag. Throughout 2023 he toured the Netherlands and Europe, and released his EP And So It Begins. He closed the year with a performance for 3FM Serious Request in Nijmegen.

In 2024, Blanks collaborated with Hungarian artist Azahriah, performing together in Budapest. Later that year he toured with his band across the United States, Europe and the Netherlands. In March 2025, Azahriah and Blanks released their single Don't Be Afraid. In June 2025, he released That's What I Love About You, marking the start of a new musical chapter.

=== Songwriting and production ===
Alongside his own releases, De Wit writes and produces for other artists. His credits include Stukje Van Mij by MEAU, Atlas by Pommelien Thijs and Nog Even Blijven by MEAU & Douwe Bob.

In 2024, Het beste moet nog komen by Pommelien Thijs — co-written and produced by De Wit — won the MIA for Hit of the Year. Stukje Van Mij won a Buma Award in 2025. Atlas broke the Belgian chart record in 2025, becoming the longest-running No. 1 single in the history of the Ultratop 50.

=== Entrepreneurship ===
De Wit is co-owner of the independent label Excited About Music, which achieved its first Dutch Top 40 entry in 2021 with MEAU's Dat heb jij gedaan. Together with his management team, he co-founded 97PM, an artist-management company representing acts such as MEAU, jet van der steen, Isabel van Gelder and Jack Shore.

In 2022, the label Excited About Music (Simon de Wit, Marcel Duzink and Pieter Kleinhout) received the STOMP Young Achievement Award.

In 2023, De Wit appeared in the Dutch feature film Goodbye Stranger.

During the summer of 2023, he served as assistant coach to Pommelien Thijs on The Voice Kids in Belgium.

== Discography ==
=== Blanks Singles ===
Year	Title	EP / Album	Notes
2019	Don't Stop	cheap sodas and ice cream kisses	
2019	Wave	cheap sodas and ice cream kisses	3FM Megahit
2019	Let's Get Lost	cheap sodas and ice cream kisses	
2019	Higher	cheap sodas and ice cream kisses	
2019	Bittersweet		
2019	Everything's Changing		Theme song 3FM Serious Request
2020	Sweaters		
2020	Favorite Nightmare	cheap sodas and ice cream kisses	
2020	Dance Alone	cheap sodas and ice cream kisses	
2020	Silly People	cheap sodas and ice cream kisses	
2020	Seaside	cheap sodas and ice cream kisses	
2020	Oh No		
2020	Stranger		
2021	What You Do to Me	Nothing Lasts Forever And That's OK	Harde Schijf Radio 538
2021	Turn Around	Nothing Lasts Forever And That's OK	
2021	Classic Armstrong	Nothing Lasts Forever And That's OK	
2021	Never Have I Ever	Nothing Lasts Forever And That's OK	
2021	I'm Sorry	Nothing Lasts Forever And That's OK	
2021	Chasing After Memories	Nothing Lasts Forever And That's OK	
2021	Dance Like This	Nothing Lasts Forever And That's OK	
2021	Asking For Too Much	Nothing Lasts Forever And That's OK	
2021	OK to Cry	Nothing Lasts Forever And That's OK	3FM Megahit
2021	Except For you	Nothing Lasts Forever And That's OK	
2022	Lost in the Moment	Nothing Lasts Forever And That's OK (Deluxe)	
2022	Home Without a Heart	Nothing Lasts Forever And That's OK (Deluxe)	
2022	In My Feelings	Nothing Lasts Forever And That's OK (Deluxe)	
2022	Amor Amor Amor	Beste Zangers 2022 (Blanks)	
2022	Now I Know What Love Is	Beste Zangers 2022 (Blanks)	
2022	One in a Million	Beste Zangers 2022 (Blanks)	
2022	It'll Be Fine	Beste Zangers 2022 (Blanks)	
2022	Your Love Is All I Got	Beste Zangers 2022 (Blanks)	
2022	Jeanny	Beste Zangers 2022 (Blanks)	
2022	Heel Jou	Beste Zangers 2022 (Blanks)	Duet with Claudia de Breij
2022	Circle of Life	Beste Zangers 2022 (Blanks)	Duet with Ferdi Bolland
2023	Breathe In Breathe Out	And So It Begins	
2023	What You Got (Ayo)	And So It Begins	
2023	Nobody Knows	And So It Begins	
2023	Not Scared Anymore	And So It Begins	
2023	Find Myself Again	And So It Begins	
2023	Love Situation (911)	And So It Begins	
2024	Love Situation (911) - Sped Up		
2024	Where Did The Time Go		
2024	Heart On Fire		
2024	Hopes Up High		
2024	We're Gonna Be Okay		
2025	Don't Be Afraid		Duet with Azahriah
2025	That's What I Love About You		
2025	Run Right Back		
2025	Won't You Be My Baby		

=== Blanks Albums ===
Year	Title	EP / Album
2020	Cheap Sodas and Ice Cream Kisses	EP
2021	Nothing Lasts Forever and That's OK	Album
2022	Nothing Lasts Forever and That's OK (Deluxe)	Album
2023	And So It Begins	EP

=== Songwriting en producing ===
Date	Artist	Title	EP / Album	Charts				Role	Notes
Date	Artist	Title	EP / Album	NL (Top 40)		BE (Ultratop 50)		Role	Notes
Date	Artist	Title	EP / Album	Peak	Weeks	Peak	Weeks	Role	Notes
2019	Stefan en Sean, Bram Krikke	Potentie		—	—	—	—	Songwriter, Producer	Gold (NL)
2019	Stefan en Sean, Bram Krikke	Frikandel Speciaal		—	—	—	—	Songwriter, Producer	
2020	The Cool Quest	PUNISHER		—	—	—	—	Songwriter	
2020	The Cool Quest	temporary		—	—	—	—	Songwriter, Producer	
2020	Jesse Hoefnagels, Antoon	Leven Is Een Film		—	—	—	—	Songwriter, Producer	
2021	MEAU	Afgesloten	Kalmte	—	—	—	—	Songwriter, Producer	
2021	Joe Buck	grounded		—	—	—	—	Songwriter, Producer	
2021	MEAU	Relativeren	Kalmte	—	—	—	—	Songwriter, Producer	
2021	MEAU	Ouder	Kalmte	—	—	—	—	Songwriter, Producer	
2021	MEAU	Kans	Kalmte	—	—	—	—	Songwriter, Producer	
2021	AKA Block, Muntu	Best Friend		—	—	—	—	Songwriter	
2021	Joe Buck	wat als		—	—	—	—	Producer	
2021	The Cool Quest	PARTY ON THE BLOC		—	—	—	—	Songwriter	
2021	Tim Dawn	Another Time	Everyday Magic	—	—	—	—	Songwriter	
2021	Tim Dawn	Everyday Magic	Everyday Magic	—	—	—	—	Songwriter	
2021	Tim Dawn	Fine Line	Everyday Magic	—	—	—	—	Songwriter	
2021	Tim Dawn	Christmas Time (Make It Up To You)		—	—	—	—	Songwriter	
2022	Maxine	Only Us		—	—	—	—	Songwriter, Producer	
2022	More Ease	Nobody Wants To Die		—	—	—	—	Songwriter, Producer	
2022	Stefan en Sean, Bram Krikke	SIMP		—	—	—	—	Songwriter, Producer	
2022	Maxine	Voor Altijd		—	—	—	—	Songwriter, Producer	
2022	The Cool Quest	MY LITTLE PEACE OF MIND		—	—	—	—	Songwriter, Producer	
2022	Joe Buck	live with the hurt		—	—	—	—	Songwriter	
2022	Pommelien Thijs	Zilver	Per Ongeluk	—	—	6	17	Songwriter	
2023	More Ease	Same Old Story		—	—	—	—	Producer	
2023	MEAU	Terug In Mijn Armen	22	—	—	—	—	Songwriter, Producer	
2023	More Ease	Night Shift		—	—	—	—	Songwriter, Producer	
2023	Pommelien Thijs	Erop Of Eronder	Per Ongeluk	—	—	1	44	Songwriter	
2023	Pommelien Thijs, Meau	Droom Het Donker Weg	Per Ongeluk	—	—	—	—	Songwriter, Producer	
2023	Pommelien Thijs	Oog Voor Een Oog	Per Ongeluk	—	—	—	—	Songwriter, Producer	
2023	Pommelien Thijs, Kaat Thijs	Kleine Tornado	Per Ongeluk	—	—	38	1	Songwriter, Producer	
2023	Pommelien Thijs	Dunne Lijn	Per Ongeluk	—	—	—	—	Songwriter, Producer	
2023	Laura Sjin	Buikpijn		—	—	—	—	Songwriter, Producer	
2023	MEAU	Eigen Weg		—	—	—	—	Producer	
2023	Yaro Mila	Talk Of The Town		—	—	—	—	Songwriter	
2023	The Cool Quest	dancing with the devil		—	—	—	—	Songwriter	
2023	jet van der steen	Dans Op Het Mes	Alles Komt, Alles Gaat	—	—	—	—	Songwriter, Producer	
2023	MEAU	Altijd Op Je Wacht	22	—	—	—	—	Songwriter, Producer	
2023	Pommelien Thijs, Bazart	Hou Mij Vast		—	—	4	21	Songwriter	Platinum (BE)
2024	MEAU	Stukje Van Mij	Liefde Onderschat	7	14	45	1	Songwriter, Producer	Platinum (NL)
2024	Tom Frane	Another Place		—	—	—	—	Producer	
2024	Pommelien Thijs	Het beste moet nog komen	Gedoe	—	—	1	19	Songwriter, Producer	Platinum (BE)
2024	Isabel van Gelder	Feel Again		—	—	—	—	Producer	
2024	Tash Wolf	The Deal		—	—	—	—	Songwriter	
2024	Pauline	Energie		—	—	29	11	Songwriter, Producer	
2024	jet van der steen	LUCIFER	Alles Komt, Alles Gaat	—	—	—	—	Songwriter, Producer	
2024	Holliz	Here To Stay		—	—	27	6	Songwriter, Producer	
2024	Yaro Mila	Don't Think Twice		—	—	—	—	Songwriter, Producer	
2024	XINK	Neem Me Mee	Dag Nul	—	—	—	—	Producer	
2024	Maksim	Dopamine	Dagdromer	—	—	—	—	Songwriter, Producer	
2024	jet van der steen	Verlaten Terrein	Alles Komt, Alles Gaat	—	—	—	—	Songwriter, Producer	
2024	Anna-Rose Clayton	when you cal me (bby)	address ur mess	—	—	—	—	Songwriter, Producer	
2024	jet van der steen	Antwoord	Alles Komt, Alles Gaat	—	—	—	—	Songwriter, Producer	
2024	jet van der steen	De Lift (bonustrack)	Alles Komt, Alles Gaat	—	—	—	—	Producer	
2025	MEAU	Altijd Weer Naar Huis	Liefde Onderschat	—	—	—	—	Songwriter, Producer	
2025	Simon Keizer	Anders Dan Anders	Ruimte	—	—	—	—	Songwriter, Producer	
2025	XINK	Op Hoop Van Zegen	Dag Nul	—	—	—	—	Songwriter, Producer	
2025	Anna-Rose Clayton	waterproof	address ur mess	—	—	—	—	Songwriter, Producer	
2025	Anna-Rose Clayton	emotionally detached	address ur mess	—	—	—	—	Songwriter, Producer	
2025	Anna-Rose Clayton	guilty (overthinking)	address ur mess	—	—	—	—	Songwriter, Producer	
2025	Anna-Rose Clayton	XOXO	address ur mess	—	—	—	—	Songwriter, Producer	
2025	XINK	De Antiheld	Dag Nul	—	—	—	—	Producer	
2025	XINK	Appartement (Blok 34-7)	Dag Nul	—	—	—	—	Producer	
2025	XINK	IRMA	Dag Nul	—	—	—	—	Producer	
2025	XINK	Waar Gaan We Heen	Dag Nul	—	—	—	—	Producer	
2025	XINK	Voorbij	Dag Nul	—	—	—	—	Producer	
2025	XINK	Wacht	Dag Nul	—	—	—	—	Producer	
2025	Pommelien Thijs	Atlas	Gedoe	5	20	1	35	Songwriter, Producer	
2025	MEAU	Vergeef Me	Liefde Onderschat	—	—	—	—	Producer	
2025	Isabel van Gelder	Die For You		—	—	—	—	Producer	
2025	2'Live Bre	Southern Country Girl		—	—	—	—	Songwriter, Producer	USA
2025	MEAU	Een Nacht Als Deze	Liefde Onderschat	—	—	23	16	Songwriter, Producer	
2025	Jaap Reesema, Line de Dauw	Met Of Zonder Jou		—	—	—	—	Songwriter, Producer	
2025	jet van der steen	Rondjes	Niemand Gaat Het Voor Je Doen	—	—	—	—	Producer	
2025	Pommelien Thijs	Ben Je Klaar	Gedoe	—	—	2	14		
2025	Isabel van Gelder	My Silly Boy		—	—	—	—	Producer	
2025	MEAU, Douwe Bob	Nog Even Blijven	Liefde Onderschat	5	12	26	6	Songwriter, Producer	
2025	jet van der steen	Praat Te Veel	Niemand Gaat Het Voor Je Doen	—	—	—	—	Songwriter, Producer	
2025	Pommelien Thijs	Koning Minimaliseren	Gedoe	—	—	—	—	Producer	
2025	Pommelien Thijs	Bel Me Als Je Thuis Bent	Gedoe	—	—	—	—	Songwriter, Producer	
2025	jet van der steen	Juni	Niemand Gaat Het Voor Je Doen	—	—	—	—	Songwriter, Producer	
2025	MEAU	Eer Aan Mezelf	Liefde Onderschat	—	—	—	—	Songwriter, Producer	
2025	Isabel van Gelder	Bathroom Floor		—	—	—	—	Producer	
