= Koningin van alle mensen =

Single by RTL Boulevard United
- Released: 16 April 2013
- Recorded: 2013
- Length: 3:55
- Songwriters: Fluitsma & Van Tijn

Koningin van alle mensen (English: Queen of All People) is a song by a group of Dutch artists written in homage to the Dutch Queen Beatrix, who resigned on 30 April 2013. Initiated by Albert Verlinde and Winston Gerschtanowitz. The production duo Fluitsma and Van Tijn wrote the song from the tune of 15 Miljoen Mensen. The recording was made on 9 April 2013 by a number of Dutch singers and musicians, and released on 16 April 2013 as a download. It reached #1 on the Dutch iTunes Chart. The proceeds from the sale of the single went to the Princesse Beatrix Fund.

== Contributing Artists ==
- Najib Amhali
- Willeke Alberti
- Frans Bauer
- Jeroen van der Boom
- Xander de Buisonjé
- Pia Douwes
- Tim Douwsma
- Edwin Evers
- Danny Froger
- René Froger
- Winston Gerschtanowitz
- Josje Huisman
- Wolter Kroes
- Lieke van Lexmond
- Ralf Mackenbach
- Danny de Munk
- Sandra Reemer
- Albert Verlinde
