= Dennie Christian =

German singer of schlager music

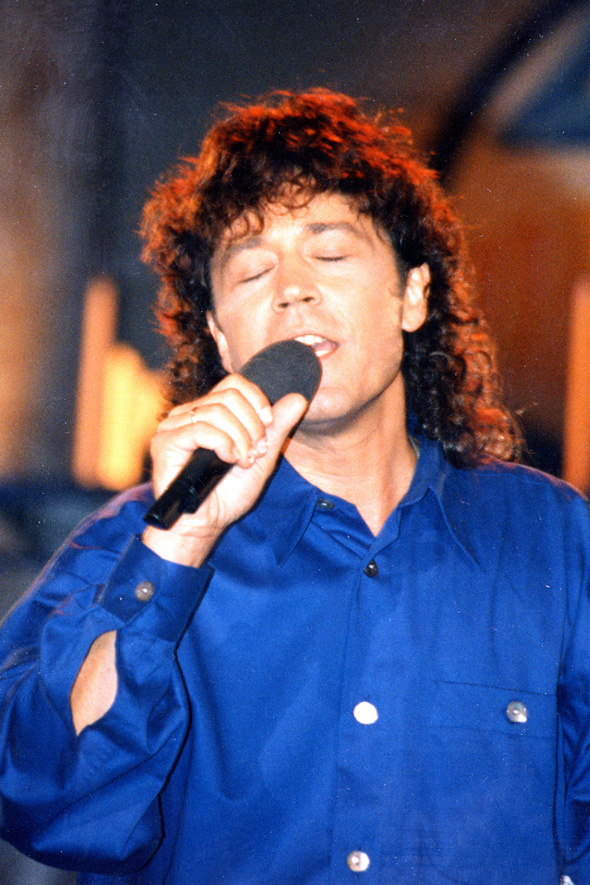
Dennie Christian, 1995, in Kerkrade

Dennie Christian (born Bernhard Althoff on 22 May 1956 in Bergisch Gladbach) is a German singer of schlager music popular in Germany and the Netherlands; he sings in both languages. His breakthrough song was "Rosamunde" in 1975(a version of "Beer Barrel Polka"), and one of his biggest Dutch hits was "Wij zijn twee vrienden" (a song about comic character Gaston and his friend the Marsupilami). In 2017, he participated in the Dutch TV show Beste Zangers.
