= Beat Royalty =

Californian music production team

Beat Royalty is a Los Angeles based music production team. It was founded in 2005 by Dutch music producers Chris Kooreman and Edo Plasschaert and is part of EMI Music Publishing. Before Kooreman and Plasschaert formed Beat Royalty they worked under the name Big 'n Nasteez.

In 2007, the company produced several songs for teen-singing group JammX for veteran TV-producer Merv Adelson's Lightforce entertainment. In 2008, Beat Royalty produced Dutch singer Sabrina Starke's debut album Yellow Brick Road which was released October 1. The album was initially released on Dutch independent label Star-K Records but was slated for a re-release on Blue Note late 2008. The released version went gold in the Netherlands on March 9.

As of 2006, the team has expanded with collaborations with EMI-signed songwriters/producers Vie Le and Lawrence August.
