= Ruben Annink =

Dutch singer-songwriter (born 1998)

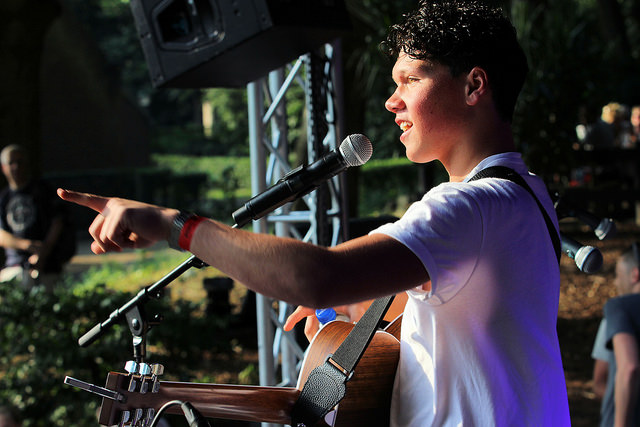
- Born: Ruben Cornelis Lucas Moolhuizen; 13 June 1998 (age 27); Amsterdam
- Website: https://www.rubenannink.com/

Ruben Cornelis Lucas Moolhuizen (born in Amsterdam on 13 June 1998), known by his stage name as Ruben Annink, is a Dutch singer-songwriter.

== Career ==
In 2012, he participated in the second season of The Voice Kids., but didn't get past the "Battle-round". In 2015, he was a candidate in the fourth season of De beste singer-songwriter in which he became the runner up in the finals against Anna Rune.

On 22 May 2015, Ruben Annink appeared as a guest, with Ali B, in the Dutch TV program De Wereld Draait Door. Here he and Ali performed the song "Terwijl jullie nog bij me zijn", as homage to Ali B his kids. In 2018, Ruben Annink left his record label Trifecta and joined Warner Music Benelux.

On 25 January 2016, he wrote a song about writer Pia de Jong in honor of her book called Charlotte which she presented in De Wereld Draait Door. The day after he performed the song in the same program. Also in 2016 he brought out the single 'Nu of Nooit', together with rapper Johnna Fraser and DJ and vlogger Monica Geuze and wrote the Dutch theme song for Angry Birds: The Movie.

In February 2017, he released the song "Twee Shots" with rapper Keizer, a month later the single "Rokjesdag" followed. Later that year he released the song "Tijdmachine" with Teske De Schepper.

At the end of August 2019, Ruben appeared in the Dutch TV program Beste Zangers and in early 2020 he played at Eurosonic Noorderslag. This performance was the starting point of a club tour of the Netherlands. Unfortunately this tour was postponed because of the COVID-19 pandemic. From that point on Ruben focused on creating new songs, of which he released 'Papa' and 'Dat Het Morgen Lukt' for the multiple champion paralympic snowboarder Bibian Mentel who was fighting cancer. His club tour recommenced in October 2021.

== Discography ==
Singles

Singles and chartposition(s) in the Dutch Top 40	Date of release	Date of entry	Highest position	Weeks	Comments
Terwijl jullie nog bij me zijn	25 May 2015	13 June 2015	32	3	with Ali B / Nr. 10 in thee Single Top 100
Nu of nooit	2016	4 June 2016	tip6	–	with Monica Geuze & Jonna Fraser / Nr. 34 in the Single Top 100
Iemand	2020	11 July 2020	tip22	–	

Single and chartposition(s) in the Flemish Ultratop 50	Date of release	Datum of entry	Highest position	Weeks	Comments
Miljoen	2017	16 September 2017	tip	–	with StukTV
Wie ze was	2018	4 August 2018	tip	–	
