= Henk Poort =

Dutch actor and singer (born 1956)

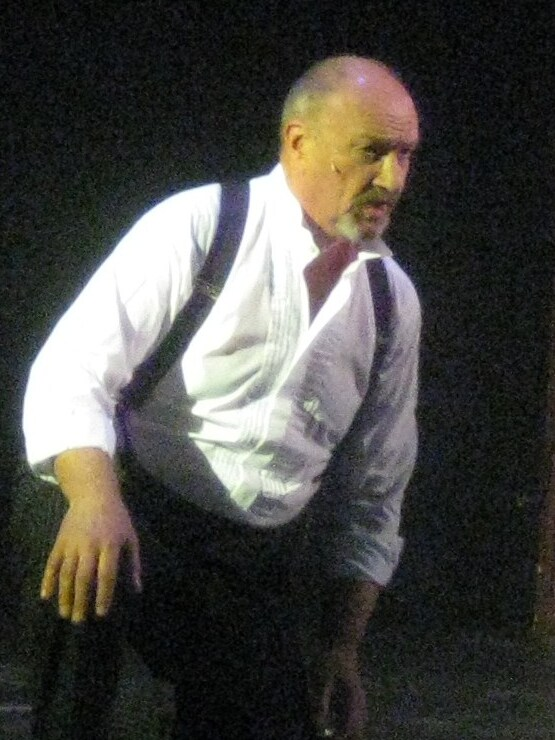
- Henk Poort as Judge Turpin in the musical Sweeney Todd
- Born: Hendrikus Poort; 20 January 1956 (age 70); Amsterdam, Netherlands
- Occupations: Actor, vocalist
- Website: https://www.henkpoort.nl

Henk Poort (born 20 January 1956) is a Dutch actor and singer, who mainly plays in operas and musicals.

== Biography ==
Henk Poort is a Dutch singer born in 1956. Poort's major roles include Erik (the Phantom) in the Dutch version of The Phantom of the Opera and Jean Valjean in the first staging of the Dutch version of Les Misérables in the late 1990s. He also sang as one of the "17 Valjeans" at Les Misérables: The Dream Cast in Concert. His most recent role was Tevye in Anatevka.

Beyond musicals and opera, he dubbed the voice of Gaston in the Dutch version of Disney's animation film Beauty and the Beast.

In 2019 Nightwish vocalist Floor Jansen performed Phantom of the Opera with Poort for the Dutch TV show Beste Zangers. The performance has attracted over 29 million viewers on YouTube so far (as of August 2026).

Their performance was so well received that Nightwish revived their cover of the song live on stage for the first time in 17 years featuring Poort as a guest vocalist. The show in Amsterdam on November 28, 2022, was filmed for a future DVD release.

He performed the Dutch national anthem at the 2025 Dutch F1 Grand Prix.
