= Kenny B =

Surinamese reggae singer (born 1964)

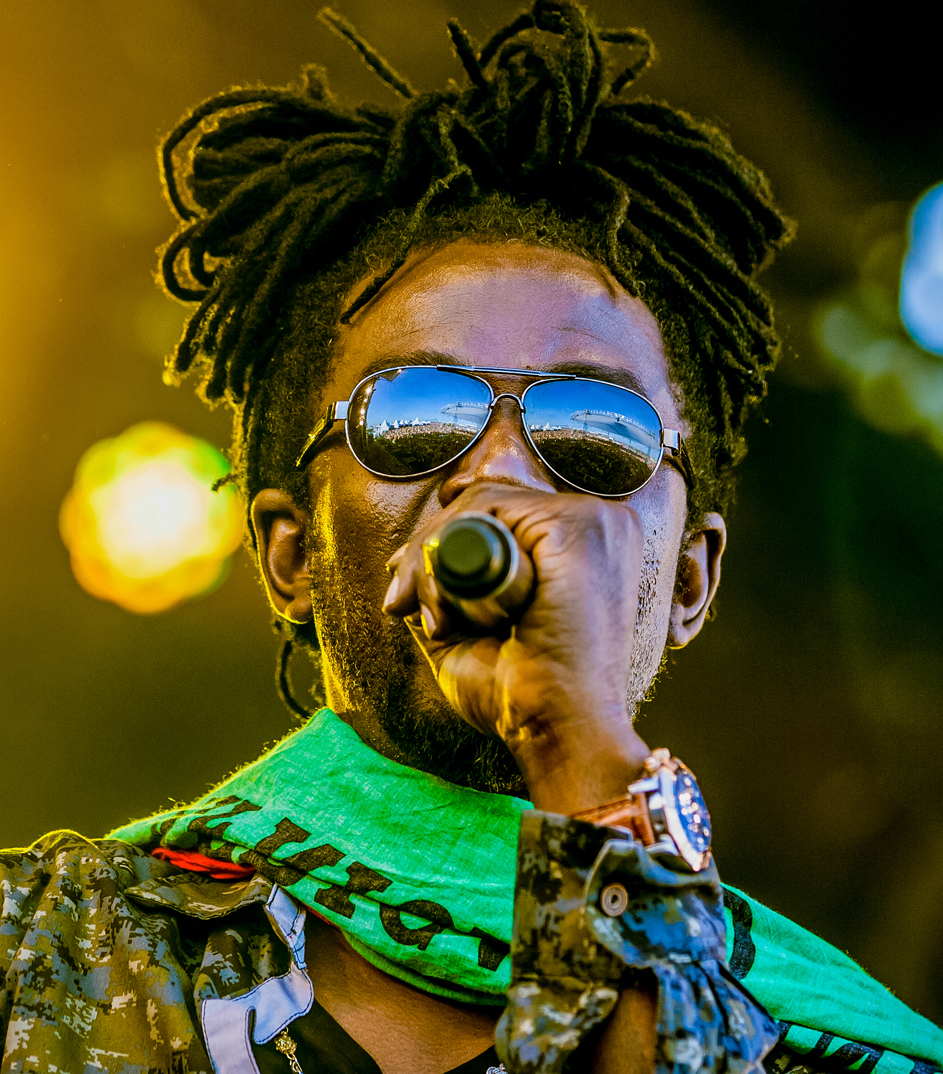
- Kenny B performing in 2015

Background information
- Also known as: Kenny B
- Born: Kenneth Bron; 1 November 1961 (age 64); Paramaribo, Suriname
- Genres: Reggae
- Occupation: Singer
- Instrument: Vocals
- Years active: 1970–present
- Label: TopNotch

Kenneth Bron (born 1 November 1961), known professionally as Kenny B, is a Surinamese reggae singer.

== Biography ==
Bron, a former servant of the Surinamese army, is inspired by Bob Marley. He began his career in English and Sranan before being persuaded to sing in Dutch. Kenny B signed to the TopNotch-label and released his album Kenny B in May 2015. It topped the Dutch Album Chart for one week. The second single Parijs chronicled a by-chance-meeting with a Dutch girl in Paris who barely speaks French. It spent seven weeks on top of the Dutch Top 40 chart and gave rise to parody-versions.

In 2016, Kenny B recorded two collaboration-singles; one with rapper/tv-presenter Ali B and R&B-singer Brace, the other, a translated cover-version of 54-46 That's My Number with established pop/reggae-band Doe Maar. He also provided the Dutch voice of Tamatoa in the Moana-movie and wrote a song for children's choir Kinderen voor Kinderen.

In 2017, Kenny B participated in the tv-contest Beste Zangers (Best Singers).

Kenny B performs in and outside Dutch-speaking countries, and is a copyright-ambassador for other Surinamese artists. In 2019 he released the follow-up to his self-titled album and had his tenth no.1-hit on Surinamese station Radio 10 Magic FM.

== Discography ==
=== Albums ===
- Bosie mie (2009)
- The Best of 2011
- Kenny B (2015)
- Hoe Dan Ook (2019)

=== Charted songs ===
Title	Year	Peak chart position	Album
Title	Year	SUR	Album
"Go Fii"	2020	4	Non-album singles
"Nergens Heen"	2022	16	Non-album singles
"Fa un de ya" (with Kater Karma)	2022	1	Non-album singles
"Faandi" (with Kater Karma)	2022	13	Non-album singles
"Never Leave"	2023	2	Non-album singles

== Filmography ==
=== Films ===
- Moana (2016) - Dutch version
- Sing Song (2017)
- Soul (2020) - Dutch version
