= Glennis Grace =

Dutch singer (born 1978)

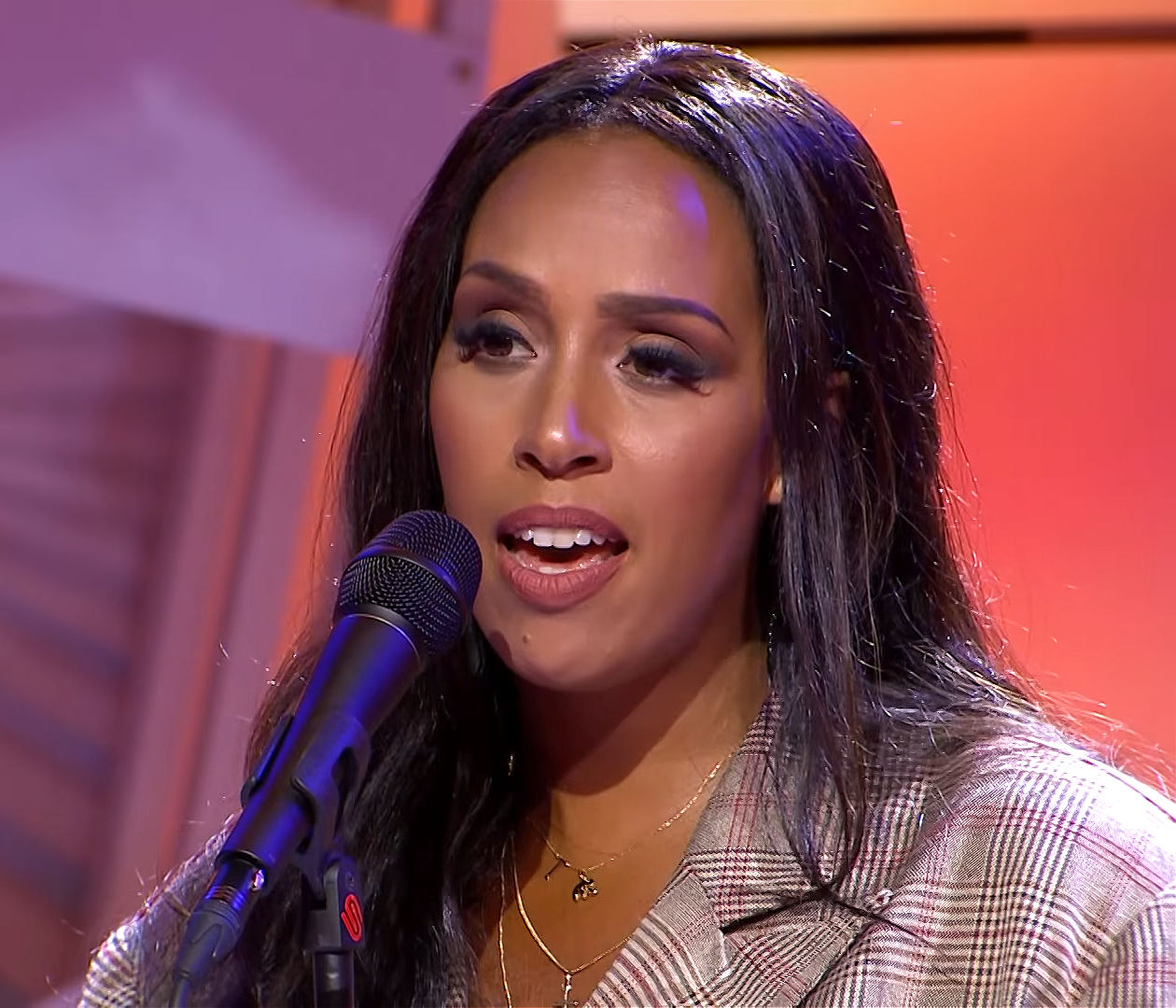
- Grace in 2019

Background information
- Born: Glenda Hulita Elisabeth Batta; June 19, 1978 (age 48); Amsterdam, Netherlands
- Occupation: Singer
- Years active: 1994–present
- Website: glennisgrace.nl

Glenda Hulita Elisabeth Batta (born 19 June 1978), known professionally as Glennis Grace, is a Dutch singer. In 2005, she represented the Netherlands in the 50th edition of the Eurovision Song Contest, and in 2018 she appeared on the 13th season of America's Got Talent and made it to the finals. Grace has earned online attention due to the similarity between her voice and that of Whitney Houston.

== Life and career ==
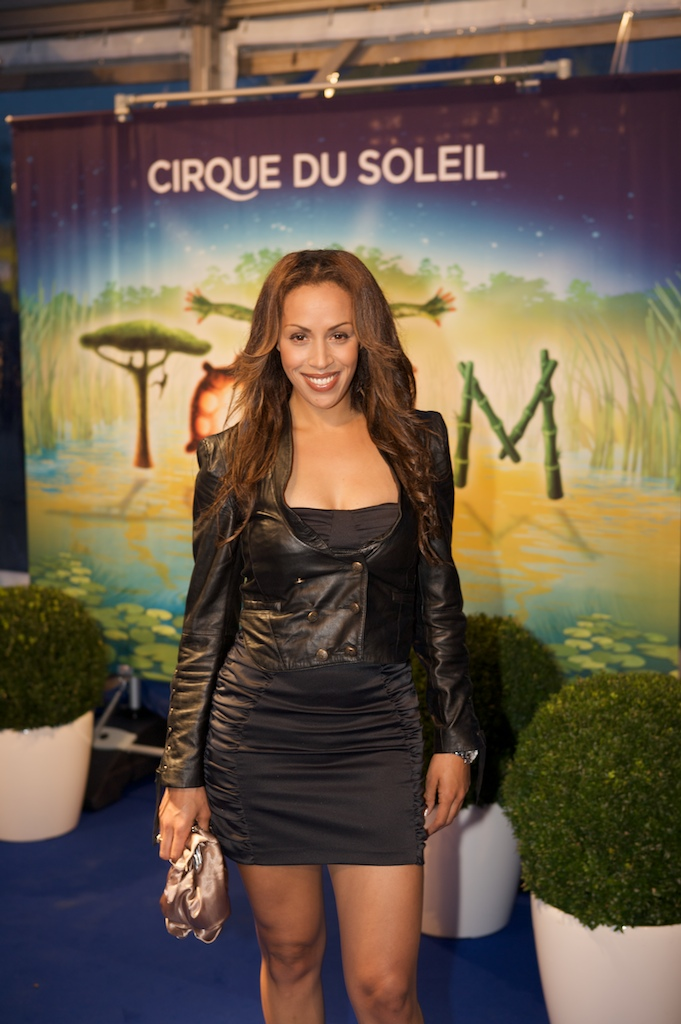
Grace at Cirque du Soleil in Amsterdam in 2010

Batta was born in Amsterdam to a Dutch mother and a father from Curaçao.

She was discovered in 1994, at the age of 15, after she won the Dutch TV talent show called Soundmixshow, where she performed the Whitney Houston song "One Moment in Time".

=== Eurovision Song Contest ===
In 2005, Grace accepted the offer to participate in the Nationaal Songfestival, the national selection in the Netherlands for the Eurovision Song Contest 2005. Grace performed the ballad "My Impossible Dream" and won the final with this song. She then represented the Netherlands in Kyiv, but ultimately did not qualify for the final.

In April 2011, she reached the top of the Dutch singles chart with a rendition of "Afscheid", a 1998 hit song of the Dutch band Volumia!, which she sang in the Dutch television program Beste Zangers.

In 2012, Grace founded the Dutch supergroup Ladies of Soul, together with fellow Dutch artists Candy Dulfer, Berget Lewis, Edsilia Rombley and Trijntje Oosterhuis. Oosterhuis left the group in 2017.

Grace was set to perform during the Eurovision Song Contest 2020 in Rotterdam, Netherlands, as an interval act alongside DJ and music producer Afrojack. The event was cancelled due to the COVID-19 pandemic. The performance eventually took place during the rescheduled Eurovision Song Contest 2021, where Grace performed "Titanium", which was co-produced by Afrojack.

=== America's Got Talent ===
Grace appeared on the 13th season of America's Got Talent in 2018. During the audition rounds (episode: June 27, 2018) Grace sang Whitney Houston's "Run to You". Grace received 'Yes' votes from all four judges and went on to the next round, where she performed "Nothing Compares 2 U" from Prince. She received rave reviews from the judges and earned a place in the quarterfinals. In the quarterfinals, Grace sang "Never Enough" from the film The Greatest Showman to reach the semifinals. In the second semifinal, she performed the Kate Bush song "This Woman's Work". This resulted in a spot in the finals together with nine other finalists. In the final she sang the song "Run" from Snow Patrol and got a standing ovation from the judges and the audience.

A day later in a separate final broadcast, Grace performed the song "Meant To Be" with American singer Bebe Rexha. She eventually did not make it into the top five finalists.

=== The Voice of Holland ===
In July 2021, it was announced that Grace would replace Jan Smit as a coach on the twelfth series of The Voice of Holland. After two audition episodes aired, the series was suspended indefinitely, due to sexual misconduct claims by (former) participants, allegedly going on for years, and aimed at the show's band leader, but also implying lax behavior of some (ex-)coaches.

=== Arrested for supermarket fight ===
On February 12, 2022, Grace was arrested along with two other persons on suspicion of a fight with adult supermarket employees in the Jumbo supermarket at the Westerstraat in Amsterdam. Her 15-year-old son had told her a supermarket employee had pushed him. His 15-year-old friend confirmed this, but unfortunately, they had not told the truth. Her son had misbehaved and he refused to stop vaping inside. He was asked to leave. He refused, got pushed and hurt his face. He came home with his face covered in blood. Grace went to the store with her boyfriend at that time and the two boys. She had told her son's friend to call his father, because he claimed he got hit too. His father was at the store with two others. The court found no communication on her phone, apart from communication with her boyfriend at that time. Without talking to each other, they went into the store and it turned into a fight. She was kept in custody for three days, after which she was released on February 15, 2022. She was formally charged on February 22, 2022. The same day, two new suspects were arrested.

She was sentenced to 200 hours of community service on November 9, 2022, for the group fight, but she was acquitted of assault. The whole incident was captured on security cameras, which were thoroughly investigated by the court. She was shown on security cameras giving a push or slap with an open hand to the manager who she thought had hurt her son and had caused him to come home covered in blood. In February, the victims claimed that she had caused no pain or harm. In April and October, they wanted to change that statement, but the judges didn't allow that. The money claims of the victims were also denied. She had decided to go to the supermarket and during her questioning she had mentioned she felt responsible for the incident.

During the 9 months between the incident and the court case, she could not talk about the incident, because of the ongoing investigation. The media talked a lot about the story and never rectified their mistakes, for example a minor victim that didn't exist or their story of her getting together a mob of 12 or 15 people. They also omitted the fact her son came home face covered in blood, even though in court evidence of that had been shown. At the trial, that was live reported on the newspaper website of court reporter Saskia Belleman, it became clear the victims were adults and there had been no communication with anyone other than her boyfriend at that time. The victims in the supermarket incident were 21, 26 and 28 years old.

A week before the trial, she broke the silence, after the prosecution had confirmed to the media they had added Threat to the charges, without mentioning they were going to ask for acquittal. She gave her side of the story in a talk show. A week later the security camera footage and court case confirmed what she said in that interview.

She has publicly apologised and offered to talk to the victims after the trial. They agreed to that.

=== Whitney tributes and international concerts ===
Grace has become well known for singing Whitney Houston's songs. In 1994, she sang "One Moment in Time" at age 16 and she won the popular Dutch talent show Soundmixshow. In 2018, she did "Run To You" for her audition on America's Got Talent. After returning from the United States, she did her first Whitney tribute in AFas live in Amsterdam, followed by two shows in Ahoy Rotterdam in 2019.

After the COVID restrictions and the supermarket incident, which caused many of her gigs to be cancelled, she started doing more Whitney tributes again in 2023. On 18 November 2023, she performed it in Oostende, Belgium and a day after in Antwerp, Belgium. On 6 October 2024, she was in a sold-out Afas live Amsterdam again.

In February 2024, she was asked to perform for the sultan of Brunei. His son, the crown prince, had turned 50 years old and they flew her and her band in to do a Whitney tribute for them. The royal family are big fans of Whitney and flew her in for a previous party.

In October 2024, she performed at a gala in Assisi, Italy, and she announced she was working on a European tour.

Since then, she has been doing Whitney tributes around the world.

=== Ladies of Soul ===
Grace was one of the founding members of Ladies of Soul in 2014 and was a part of the group until 2024. She did the concerts from 2014 to 2019. In 2017, she did her Whitney Houston cover "Run to You", which is the best viewed video on their channel. Several of the ladies also appeared in her vlogs on her YouTube page as her friends. After the supermarket incident in 2022, she mentioned in several interviews, without naming any names, that some of her close friends had ghosted her. In 2022 Ladies of Soul cancelled their concerts planned that year in Ziggodome Amsterdam. In their statement, they said that the negative publicity around the incident had caused Grace to withdraw from the concerts and they could not do the concerts.

On 29 March 2024, Grace announced her new single and her Whitney Tribute concert in Amsterdam on 6 October 2024. The official ticket sales would start 2 April 2024. She made the announcement of her concert as an exclusive item on a radio show. On Easter Sunday 31 March 2024, Ladies of Soul announced they had big news on April 2. On 2 April 2024, they announced their concerts for April 2025 and that Grace was no longer part of the group. Their presale ticket sales started on the same day as Grace's official ticket sale, 2 April 2024.

In a TV program Shownieuws her leaving Ladies of Soul was discussed and they interviewed both the Ladies of Soul and Grace. Grace had known for a long time she was no longer part of the group. The media expert at the table said there had been mediation, but the goal from the beginning had been to get her to say she was quitting. Grace said that if they were kicking her out, they had to announce that themselves. That took them two years in the end. In the interview, Grace said it was very painful and that she would not have made the same choice. She made a mistake and paid the price for it, but she did not understand why they would not give her a second chance. But she said she will always love them and wished them luck.

In a video by newspaper Telegraaf, the Ladies of Soul were asked about the friendship with Grace and they were specifically asked if they had been the ones that ghosted her from the beginning. Grace had mentioned that in several interviews, but she never named who the friends were. They did not say yes or no. Edsilia answered that everyone was busy and she had children. Candy said that sometimes when people love each other you can have different expectations of the friendship.

In September 2024, Grace said in an interview she was hoping for a comeback someday. In February 2025, Ladies of Soul crushed that hope and announced that they would go on without her. After being asked by fans and media about Grace coming back since they announced their new concerts, they no longer wanted to talk about it and said they wanted to move on.

== Discography ==
=== Studio albums ===
Year	Title and details	Peak	
Year	Title and details	NED	BEL
1996	Real Emotions: Label: Dureco; Format: CD	—	—
2003	Secrets of My Soul: Label: EMI; Format: CD	—	—
2005	My Impossible Dream: Label: CNR Music; Format: CD	28	—
2008	Glennis (as: Glennis): Label: CNR Music; Format: CD	32	—
2012	This Is My Voice: Label: CMM; Format: CD	2	—
2014	Cover Story: Label: ECM Music; Format: CD, DD	38	3

=== Live ===
Year	Title and details	Peak		Certifications
Year	Title and details	NED	BEL	Certifications
2011	One Night Only: Label: CNR Music; Format: CD	2	—	NVPI: 2× Platinum
2012	Live in de HMH: Label: CMM; Format: DVD/CD	—	—	
2013	One Christmas Night Only: Label: CMM; Format: DVD/CD	9	—	
2015	Bitterzoet (Live & Studio Sessions): Label: CTM; Format: CD, DD	5	187	
2018	Whitney: A Tribute by Glennis Grace (Live In Concert): Label: DEMP Entertainment; Format: DVD/CD, DD	13	131	

=== Compilation ===
Year	Title	Peak
Year	Title	NED
2011	One Moment in Time - Het Beste van Glennis Grace (1995 - 2010): Label: CNR; Format: CD, DD	26

=== Extended plays ===
Year	Title	Peak
Year	Title	NED
2019	Whitney- A Tribute by Glennis Gracy (Live in Rotterdam Ahoy): Label: LOS; Format: DD	

=== Singles ===
Year	Title	Peak		Certifications
Year	Title	NED	BEL	Certifications
1994	"I'm Gonna Be Strong"	13	-	
1995	"Somewhere in Time"	46	-	
1995	"Always on My Mind"	43	-	
1995	"Here I Am"	-	-	
1998	"Goodbye"	-	-	
2003	"Absolutely Not"	68	-	
2005	"My Impossible Dream"	15	-	
2005	"Shake Up the Party"	33	-	
2007	"Hoe (as: Glennis)"	33	-	
2008	"Dansen Met Het Leven (as: Glennis)"	40	-	
2008	"Als Je Slaapt (as: Glennis)"	9	-	
2010	"Als Je Mij Weer Aankijkt"	22	-	
2011	"Afscheid"	1	59	Netherlands: Platinum
2011	"Always"	26	-	
2012	"Ik Ben Niet Van Jou"	27	-	
2013	"Ondanks Alles"	35	122	
2013	"What a Feeling"	-	-	
2014	"Royals"	-	98	
2014	"Zeg Maar Niets"	-	143	
2015	"Some Things Last Forever"	-	-	
2015	"Conqueror"	-	-	
2015	"Too Much Love Will Kill You"	-	-	
2018	"Walk on Water"	-	-	
2019	"Ik wil niet Zonder Jou"	-	-	
2019	"Empathy"	-	-	
2020	"Verlangen Naar Jou"	-	-	
2020	"Ik Kijk Naar Jou"	-	-	
2020	"Geen Traan"	-	-	
2024	"Zeg niks"	-	-	
2024	"Alsof ik jou ben"	-	-	

=== Collaboration ===
==== Collaboration: Live ====
Year	Title	Peak	
Year	Title	NED	BEL
2014	Live at the Ziggo Dome '14 (as: Ladies of Soul)	2	—
2015	Live at the Ziggo Dome '15 (as: Ladies of Soul)	3	94
2016	Live at the Ziggo Dome '16 (as: Ladies of Soul)	3	81
2017	Live at the Ziggo Dome '17 (as: Ladies of Soul)	7	56
2018	Live at the Ziggo Dome '18 (as: Ladies of Soul)	20	85

==== Collaboration: Singles ====
Year	Title	Peak		Certifications
Year	Title	NED	BEL	Certifications
2002	"Goodbye: A Love Triangle (ft. René Froger & Sylvia Samson) "	74	-	
2002	"Wereldwijd Orkest (ft. Various artists, Metropole Orkest & Vince Mendoza)"	1	-	
2011	"Wil Je Niet Nog 1 Nacht (ft. Edwin Evers)"	3	-	Netherlands: Gold
2013	"Koningslied (ft. Nationaal Comité Inhuldiging)"	1	41	
2013	"Als Het Ons Niets Zou Doen (ft. John Ewbank)"	92	-	
2013	"I'll Carry You (as: Ladies Of Soul)"	80	-	
2014	"Up Till Now (as: Ladies Of Soul)"	-	-	
2015	"Feel Good (as: Ladies Of Soul)"	-	-	
2016	"Higher (as: Ladies Of Soul)"	-	-	
2017	"Count Me In (as: Ladies Of Soul)"	-	-	
2018	"Glad IJs (ft: Broederliefde)"	58	-	

Awards and achievements
Preceded by Re-union with "Without You"	Netherlands in the Eurovision Song Contest; 2005	Succeeded by Treble with "Amambanda"
