= Frans Duijts =

Dutch singer

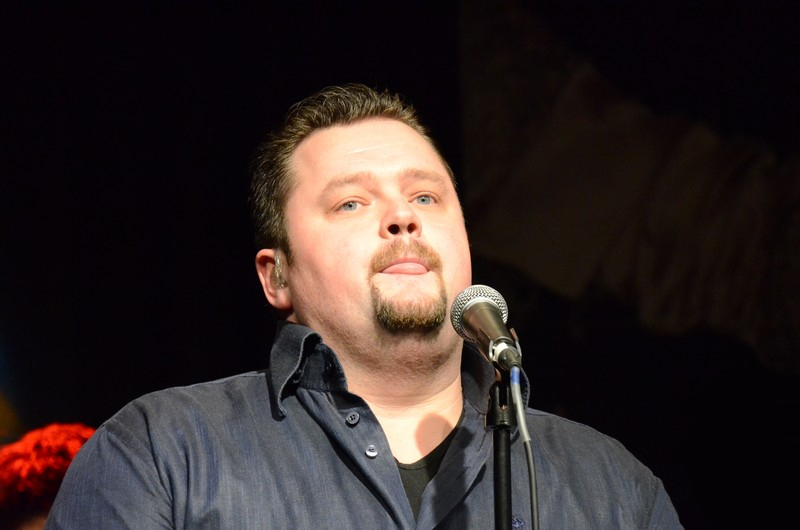
Frans Duijts as Ali B

Frans Duijts (born May 10, 1979 in Tiel) is a Dutch singer and former André Hazes-impersonator

== Biography ==
Duijts began his singing career as an André Hazes imitator. But because of the success of the song Je denkt maar dat je alles mag van mij (You think that everything you do is alright with me), a cover of an André Hazes song from 1986 (written by Pierre Kartner), Duijts decided to increase his focus on his own singing career. Meanwhile Duijts already had six hits in the Single Top 100. His album Zo ben ik mezelf (This way I can be myself) was a great success, and remained in the Album Top 100 for the maximum allowed chart-time of two years. Besides singing, he also works in the family business, a demolition company in Tiel.

In 2009 Duijts received the prize for the Nederpop hit with the most plays in pubs and restaurants in that year for his single Je denkt maar dat je alles mag van mij.

== Discography ==
=== Albums ===
Album title	Release date	Charting in the Dutch Album Top 100			Comments
Album title	Release date	Date of entry	Highest	Weeks	Comments
Zo ben ik Daan	2008	October 4, 2008	7	104	Gold
Denken dat je alles mag...	2006	June 6, 2009	39	15	
Leef je droom	February 19, 2010	February 27, 2010	2	43	Gold
Tijdloos	2016	October 29, 2016	15		

=== Singles ===
Single title	Release date	Charting in the Dutch Top 40			Comments
Single title	Release date	Date of entry	Highest	Weeks	Comments
Samen One-Night Song	2007	-			No. 82 on the Single Top 100
Jij denkt maar dat jij alles mag van mij	2008	-			No. 32 on the Single Top 100
Komt een man bij de dokter	2008	-			No. 14 on the Single Top 100
Lieveling	2009	-			No. 22 on the Single Top 100
Nee, niet zeggen hoe ik poepen moet	2009	-			No. 27 on the Single Top 100
Ik mis je	January 8, 2010	-			No. 4 on the Single Top 100
Altijd te laat naar bed	April 23, 2010	-			No. 10 on the Single Top 100
Lach en leef je dromen	August 13, 2010	-			No. 18 on the Single Top 100
Kom terug in mij	November 27, 2010	-			No. 28 on the Single Top 100
Morgen is pas overmorgen	2011				No. 1 on the Single Top 100
