= The Shuffles =

Dutch pop band (1963–1973)

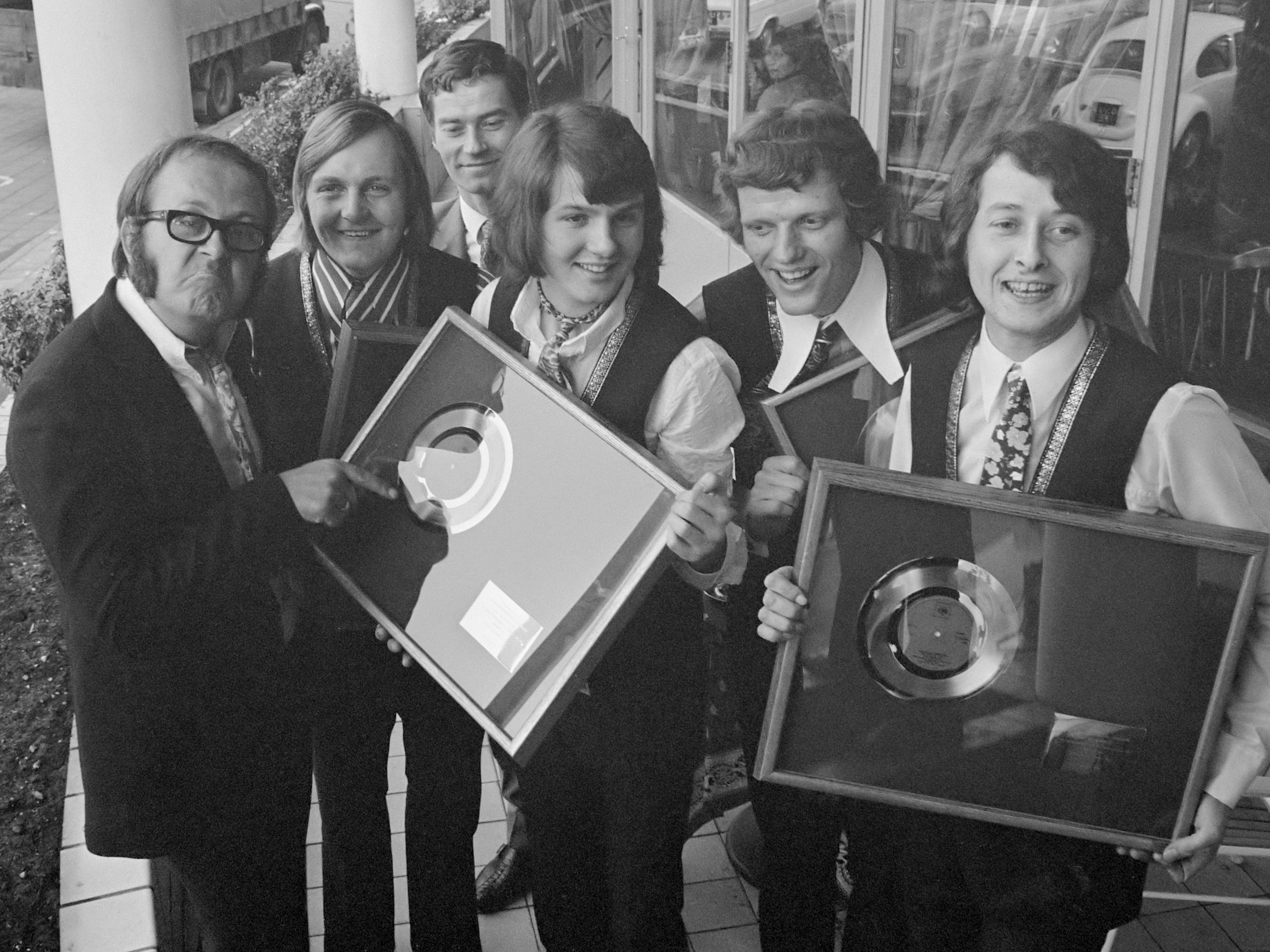
The Shuffles in February 1970.

The Shuffles were a Dutch pop band formed in Rosmalen, North Brabant. The group, fronted by the late Albert West, were active from 1963 until 1973.

== Discography ==
=== Singles ===
- 1969 – "Cha-La-La, I Need You" (NL: No. 2)
- 1970 – "Believe Now in Tomorrow"
- 1970 – "Bitter Tears" (NL: No. 8)
- 1970 – "Teardrop on Teardrop" (NL: No. 25)
- 1970 – "The Way the Music Goes" (NL: No. 12)
- 1970 – "Without You" (NL: No. 16)
- 1971 – "Glory, Glory"
- 1971 – "I Give You My Love"
- 1971 – "Waiting for a letter"
- 1971 – "Sing little girl"
