= Isabel van Gelder =

Dutch singer-songwriter

- Genres: pop music
- Occupation: singer-songwriter

Isabel van Gelder (born 2003 (age 22–23) in Amsterdam) is a Dutch singer-songwriter. She released her first music starting in 2023 and gained wider recognition through performances at Popronde and Eurosonic Noorderslag, among others. In 2026, she released her debut EP Minor Details and performed in the Netherlands, Belgium, and other European countries.

== Life course ==
Isabel van Gelder grew up in Amsterdam. In 2023, she released her first singles, introducing herself as a singer-songwriter to the Dutch pop scene. In 2024, she was selected for the Popronde and performed in various Dutch cities.

In January 2026, Van Gelder performed at Eurosonic Noorderslag. Music platform 3voor12 described her performance as a set of heartfelt ballads and a strong vocal focus, noting her understated stage presence.

In 2026, she presented her debut EP Minor Details at Paradiso in Amsterdam. According to 3voor12, the work is characterized by subtlety, emotional layering, and dreamy pop arrangements. In the same year, Van Gelder toured various pop venues in the Netherlands and Belgium. Additionally, in 2026, she made her European live debut with performances outside the Netherlands.

== International attention ==
In August 2025, an interview with Van Gelder appeared in the American magazine Forbes in which she spoke about her musical development and international ambitions. In the article, her single Die For You was mentioned by the author as one of the standout releases of that year.

== Musical style and influences ==
Van Gelder's music is generally described as vocal-driven pop, with influences from the singer-songwriter tradition. Her lyrics address themes such as vulnerability, personal growth, and emotional connection. Reviewers note her clear vocal sound and understated, atmospheric arrangements. Van Gelder works in the studio with various producers, including Kevin & Patrick and Jesper Hoekstra. During live performances, she is accompanied by musicians.

== Discography ==
- EPs
  - Minor Details (2026)
- Singles
  - Pieces (2023)
  - Run (2024)
  - She'll be alright (2024)
  - Feel Again (2024)
  - My Silly Boy (2025)
  - Die For You (2025)
  - Bathroom Floor (2025)
  - Obsession (2026)
  - I Don't Want To Fall In Love Again (2026)
  - Complicated (2026)
  - Kissing you away (2026)
