= Sabrina Starke =

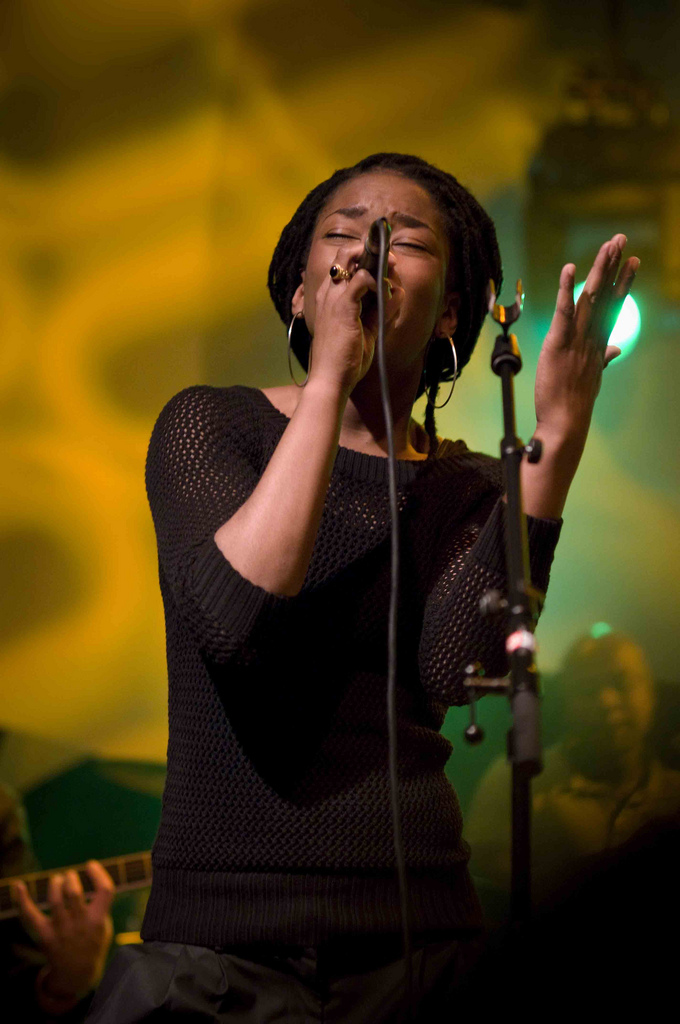
- Starke, in the Mezz, Breda, the Netherlands; December 6, 2009

Background information
- Born: August 9, 1979 (age 47); Paramaribo, Suriname
- Origin: Rotterdam, Netherlands
- Genres: Soul, folk, jazz, R&B
- Occupations: Musician, songwriter
- Instrument: Vocalist
- Years active: 2008–present
- Labels: Blue Note, EMI
- Website: Sabrina Starke official website

Sabrina Starke (born August 9, 1979) is a Surinamese-Dutch singer/songwriter from Rotterdam, Netherlands. Her style is a mix of soul, folk, R&B and jazz.

== Career ==
Starke was born on 1979 in Paramaribo, Suriname, and grew up listening to reggae music. During the 2000s, she began a career as a soul and jazz artist in Rotterdam and Amsterdam.

Her debut album Yellow Brick Road was released on October 1, 2008. It was produced and recorded in Los Angeles, California by Dutch producers Beat Royalty (Chris Kooreman and Edo Plasschaert) and mixed in Burbank, California by Brad Gilderman. She signed to EMI Netherlands.

The first single from the album, "Do for Love" was widely heard on YouTube, and also became very popular in France as the theme tune of the TV show Fortune.

On October 27, 2008, Starke signed with Blue Note, which re-released Yellow Brick Road. On March 9, the album went gold in the Netherlands.

She has won the 2008 Edison Award Best Newcomer.

== Discography ==
=== Albums ===
- 2008: Yellow Brick Road
- 2010: Bags & Suitcases
- 2012: Outside the Box
- 2013: Lean on Me (8ball Music)
- 2015: Sabrina Starke (Zip)
- 2018: Underneath the Surface

=== Singles ===
Year	Single	Album	Peak position	
Year	Single	Album	Dutch Top 40	Dutch Top 100
2008	"Do for Love"	Yellow Brick Road	-	10
2009	"Foolish"	Yellow Brick Road	-	-
2009	"A Woman's Gonna Try"	Yellow Brick Road	-	18
2010	"Home Is You"	Yellow Brick Road	-	82
2010	"Sunny Days"	Bags & Suitcases	-	72
2011	"Meer kan het niet zijn" (with BLØF)		30	32
2012	"Backseat Driver"	Outside the Box	-	45
2014	"In the Morning"		-	-
2015	"Sabrina Starke"		-	-
2019	"Underneath the Surface"		-	-
2021	"Learn to Love"		-	-
2022	"Paradise"		-	-
2022	"It Will Change"		-	-
2023	"Slow It Down"		-	-
2023	"Love the Mystery"		-	-

== Awards ==
Year	Nomination	Organization	Result
2008	Best Newcomer	Edison Award	Won
