= Albert West =

Dutch singer (1949–2015)

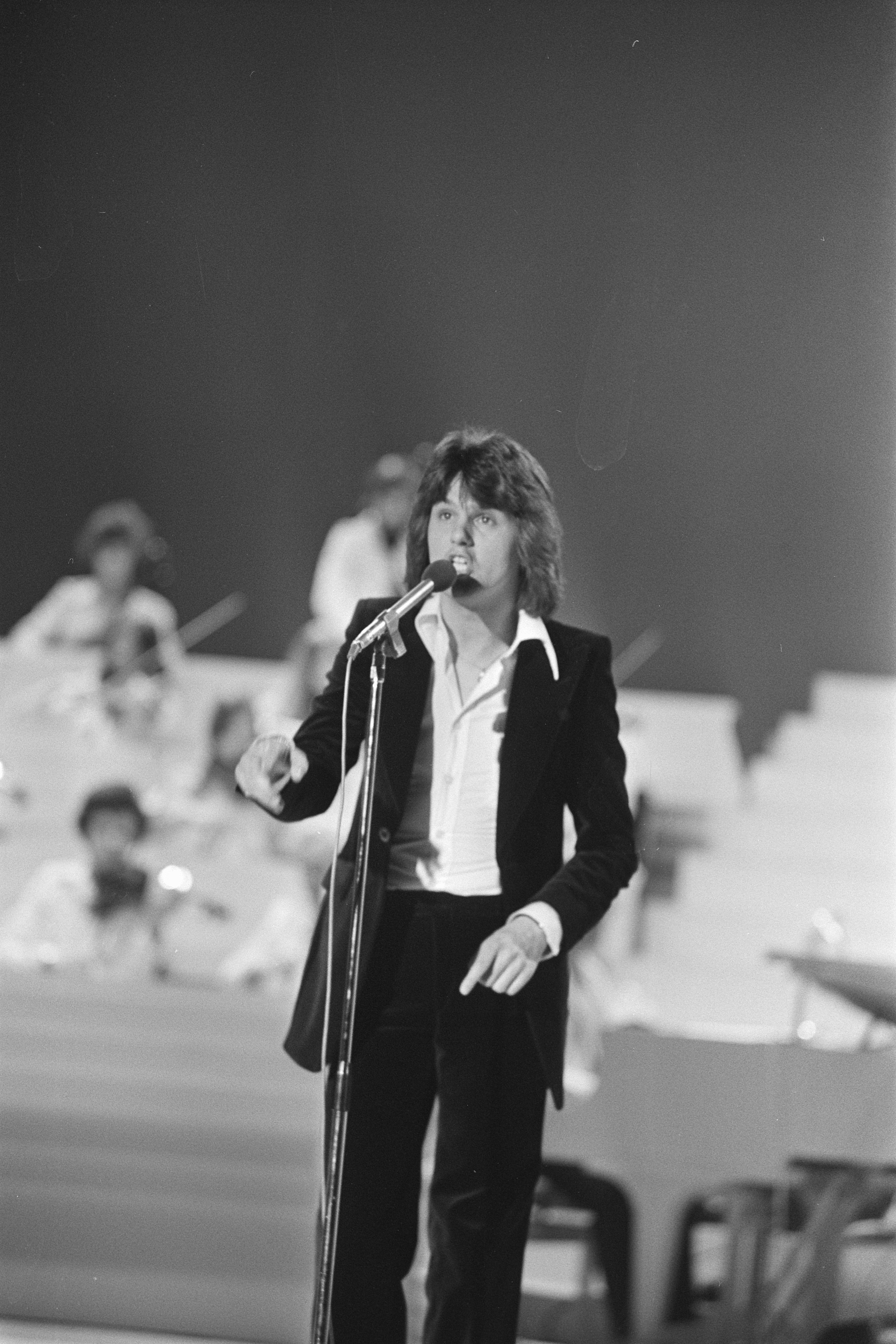
- West, c. 1975
- Born: Albertus Petrus Enricus Gerardus Westelaken; 2 September 1949 's-Hertogenbosch, North Brabant, Netherlands
- Died: 4 June 2015 (aged 65); Tilburg, North Brabant, Netherlands
- Occupation: Pop singer
- Years active: 1963—2015
- Known for: Lead singer of the Shuffles; Stars on 45

Albertus Petrus Enricus Gerardus Westelaken (2 September 1949 – 4 June 2015), better known by his stage name Albert West, was a Dutch pop singer and record producer. He was the lead singer of the Shuffles from 1963 to 1973. He was born in 's-Hertogenbosch, North Brabant.

In 1988, West recorded duets with Brian Hyland, Tony Christie and Helen Shapiro of their hit songs, as well as two duets with Nicky Stevens, for the album West & Friends.

== Discography ==
=== Albums ===
- Golden Best of Albert West (1973), CBS
- First Album (1974), Embassy
- More Golden Best of Albert West (1974), CBS
- Story Presenteert: Albert West Op Z'n Best (1975), CBS
- My Dear Rose (1975), CBS
- Memory of Life (1976), CBS
- Light Music from the Netherlands (with Cees Smal, the Four City Seven + One & Pussycat) (1976), Radio Nederland
- Hand in Hand (1979), Philips
- A Part of Me (1981), CNR
- Hammond and West (with Albert Hammond, credited as Hammond and West) (1986), K-Tel
- Albert West (1986), CNR
- West & Friends (1988), Arcade
- 25 Jaar (1989), Arcade
- Endless Summernights (1991), Polydor
- Alleen Voor Jou (1995), United Talent
- The Future Starts Today (with the Dutch Scouts Choir) (1995), Dureco
