= Ladies of Soul =

Dutch musical band

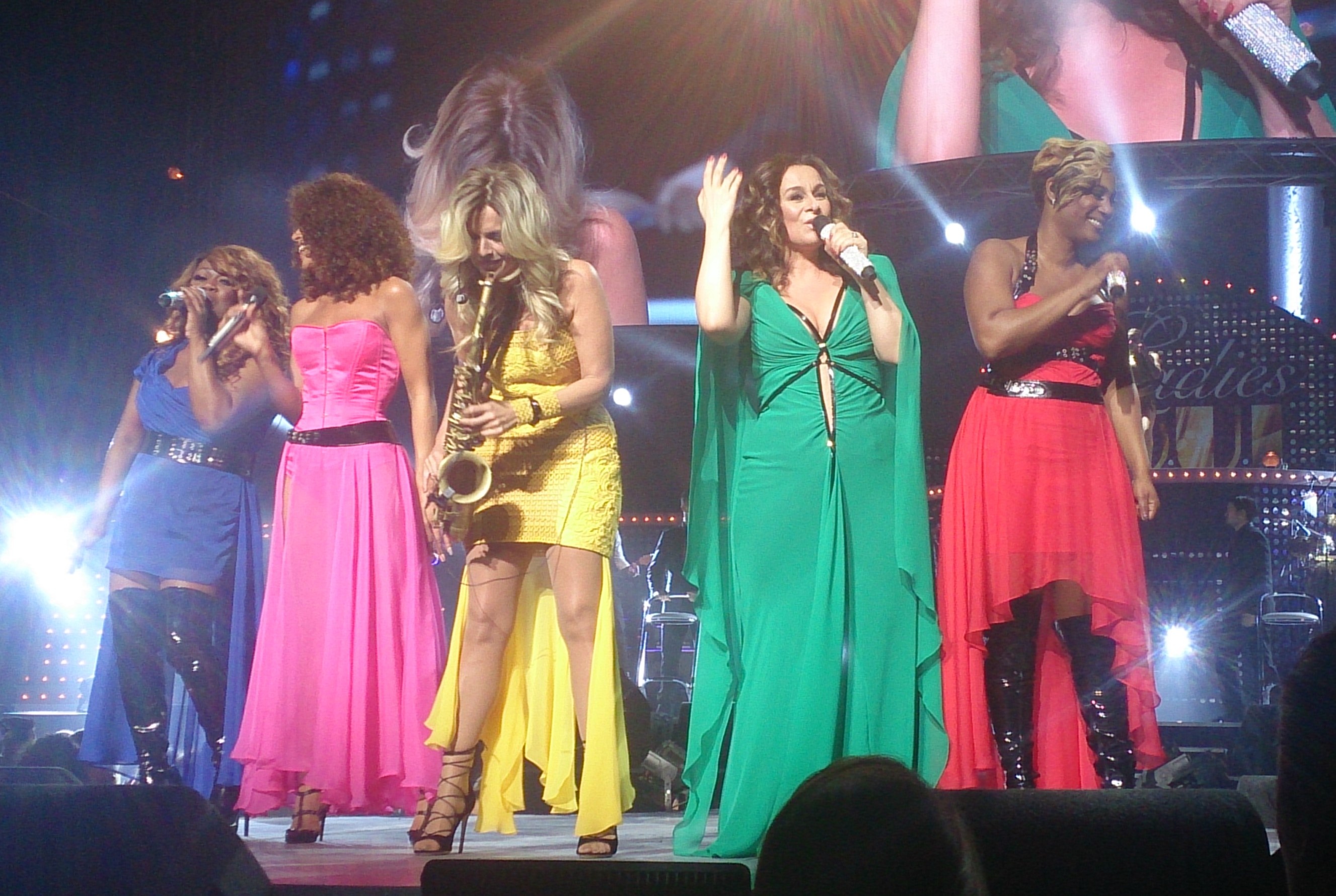
- Ladies of Soul (2015)

Background information
- Origin: Amsterdam, The Netherlands
- Genres: Pop; Soul; Disco
- Years active: 2012–present
- Label: DEMP
- Members: Candy Dulfer; Trijntje Oosterhuis; Berget Lewis; Edsilia Rombley
- Past members: Glennis Grace
- Website: www.ladiesofsoul.nl

The Ladies of Soul is a Dutch supergroup consisting of Candy Dulfer, Berget Lewis, Trijntje Oosterhuis and Edsilia Rombley. Glennis Grace, another founding member, left in 2024.

== History ==
=== Origins ===
The Ladies of Soul are a group of childhood-friends and sister-in-laws. have shared childhoods; Oosterhuis and Lewis were neighbours, Rombley, and Lewis became best friends and Oosterhuis and Dulfer were connected through relatives. They ended up pursuing careers in music and making guest appearances at each other's performances.

They got together in 2012 for a successful series of Whitney Houston memorial concerts, which was organized by Oosterhuis' brother Tjeerd (Rombley's husband). Other singers to appear in "In remembrance of Whitney Houston" were Do, Leona Philippo and Tania Kross.

By popular demand, the Ladies continued their collaboration with Tjeerd Oosterhuis for a bigger event. This resulted in 2014, in a Valentine Day's concert at Amsterdam's Ziggo Dome, dubbed Ladies of Soul.

Do was to join as a sixth member but it never happened; on 21 January 2017, she revealed on the RTL Boulevard-show that she was recovering from her first pregnancy while the others endured tight rehearsing schedules. It has never been explained why Kross didn't join. Only Philippo, winning contester of The Voice of Holland, was invited as a special guest at the first edition.

=== Success ===
In November 2013, the Ladies issued a single, I'll Carry You, as a teaser for their two sold-out concerts on 13 and 14 February 2014. These concerts were successfully recorded for cd- and DVD release.

In 2015 and 2016, the Ladies played four shows each year; three in Amsterdam and one in Belgium at Antwerp's Lotto Arena, featuring Natalia Druyts as a special guest. The 2015 shows were promoted by the single Up Till Now. Oosterhuis was unavailable for the 2016 show in Antwerp because of her pregnancy.

In 2017, the Ladies finally sold out all three nights at the Ziggo Dome. Four months later in June, Oosterhuis announced her departure; she wanted to focus on her solo-career. Oosterhuis made a guest appearance at the 5th anniversary shows on 23 and 24 March 2018.

The remaining Ladies appeared in an NPO 2 documentary following their preparations for the 2019 leg, as well as their solo careers.

=== Further developments ===
On 12 February 2021 the Ladies released a cover-version of Leo Sayer's When I Need You. It was recorded at their homes due to the corona pandemic. A show was planned for 2 July 2021 (originally 20 November 2020) but rescheduled two more times; to 29 November with an extra date added and to 23 and 24 September 2022. Both shows were ultimately cancelled in July 2022 after Grace got arrested for violent behaviour because of an incident at a supermarket; she was sentenced to community-service. The future looked uncertain till 2 April 2024; the Ladies of Soul staged a press-conference at Amsterdam's Club Dauphine to announce their eagerly-awaited comeback. A brand new show is scheduled for 4 April 2025 at the Ziggo Dome with guest-appearances by Sister Sledge, Robin S, Shirma Rouse and Giovanca. Grace is not involved after the supermarket-incident, to some fans' dismay. Oosterhuis will rejoin the group after eight years.

== Members ==
- Edsilia Rombley (aka Lady E)
- Candy Dulfer (aka Lady C)
- Berget Lewis (aka Lady B)
- Trijntje Oosterhuis (aka Lady T; 2012–2017, 2024–)

=== Former member ===
- Glennis Grace (aka Lady G; 2012–2024)

== Discography ==
Live albums:

- 2014 Ziggo Presents: Ladies of Soul Live At The Ziggo Dome
- 2015 Ziggo Presents: Ladies of Soul Live At The Ziggo Dome
- 2016 Ziggo Presents: Ladies of Soul Live At The Ziggo Dome
- 2017 Ziggo Presents: Ladies of Soul Live At The Ziggo Dome

Singles:

- I'll Carry You - 2013
- Up Till Now - 2014
- Feel Good - 2015
- Higher - 2015
- Woman's World - 2026

Video/DVD:

- 2014 Ziggo Presents: Ladies of Soul Live At The Ziggo Dome
- 2015 Ziggo Presents: Ladies of Soul Live At The Ziggo Dome
- 2016 Ziggo Presents: Ladies of Soul Live At The Ziggo Dome
- 2017 Ziggo Presents: Ladies of Soul Live At The Ziggo Dome
- 2018 Ziggo Presents: Ladies of Soul Live At The Ziggo Dome
