= Karsu =

Dutch singer (born 1990)

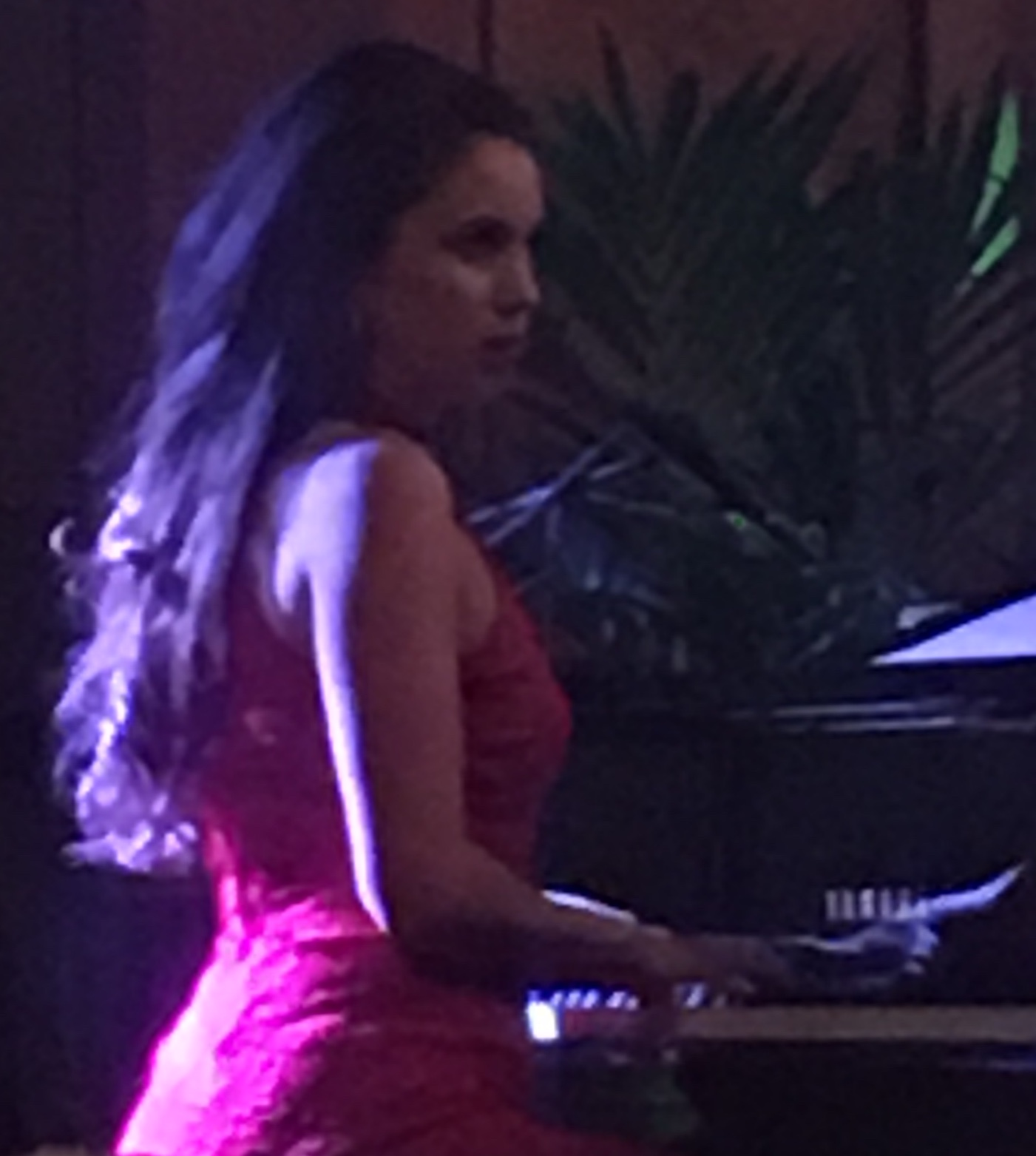
- Karsu in 2014

Background information
- Born: Karsu Dönmez; 19 April 1990 (age 36); Amsterdam, Netherlands
- Genres: Jazz; rhythm and blues; pop
- Occupations: Singer; songwriter
- Instruments: Vocals; piano
- Years active: 2007–present
- Label: SuMusic
- Website: karsu.nl

Karsu Dönmez (born 19 April 1990), known mononymously as Karsu, is a Turkish-Dutch singer, pianist and composer. While her music style is a blend of various genres, jazz pop is probably the best description for it. She has songs in Dutch, English, and Turkish.

== Biography ==
Karsu was born in Amsterdam. Her family is originally from Hatay, Turkey. At age seven, her parents bought a piano with money they had put aside for buying a car. At 14, she was making a name for herself by performing at her parents' restaurant. She came to prominence after performances at the Carnegie Hall in New York, US, and several appearances on Dutch television.

In 2010, Karsu's first album Live aan 't IJ was released. In October 2012, her first studio album, Confession, followed, and was received positively by the press. On Colors from 2015, her compositions are more playful and cheerful than her previous work. The title of the album refers to Karsu's bicultural background with roots in Turkey and Amsterdam.

In 2016, the Edison Foundation gave her the Edison Award for Colors. She built a music school for refugees in Athens. She also took role as a director, for helping refugees in Amsterdam. Her life was documented by director Mercedes Stalenhoef and follows Karsu as she climbs the ladder from the restaurant to the stage of Carnegie Hall, and further into the music world.

Karsu was one of the five finalists in the Dutch internal selection for the Eurovision Song Contest 2024, where Joost Klein was ultimately chosen.

== Discography ==
=== Studio albums ===
Album	Release date
Live aan 't IJ	2010
Confession	2012
Colors	2015
Karsu	2019

Tabula Rasa 2025

=== Live albums ===
Album	Release date
Play My Strings (Live at the Royal Concertgebouw)	2018

=== Singles ===
- "Raise Our Hands" (2014)
- "Jest Oldu" (2018)
- "Paint It Black" (2018)
- "A Change Is Gonna Come" (2018)
- "Esmerim Biçim Biçim" (2018)
- "Itiraf" (2019)
- "Sana Ne" (2019)
- "Ben Yanındayım" (feat. Çağrı Sinci) (2019)
- "Sonunda" (2021)
