= Xander de Buisonjé =

Dutch singer

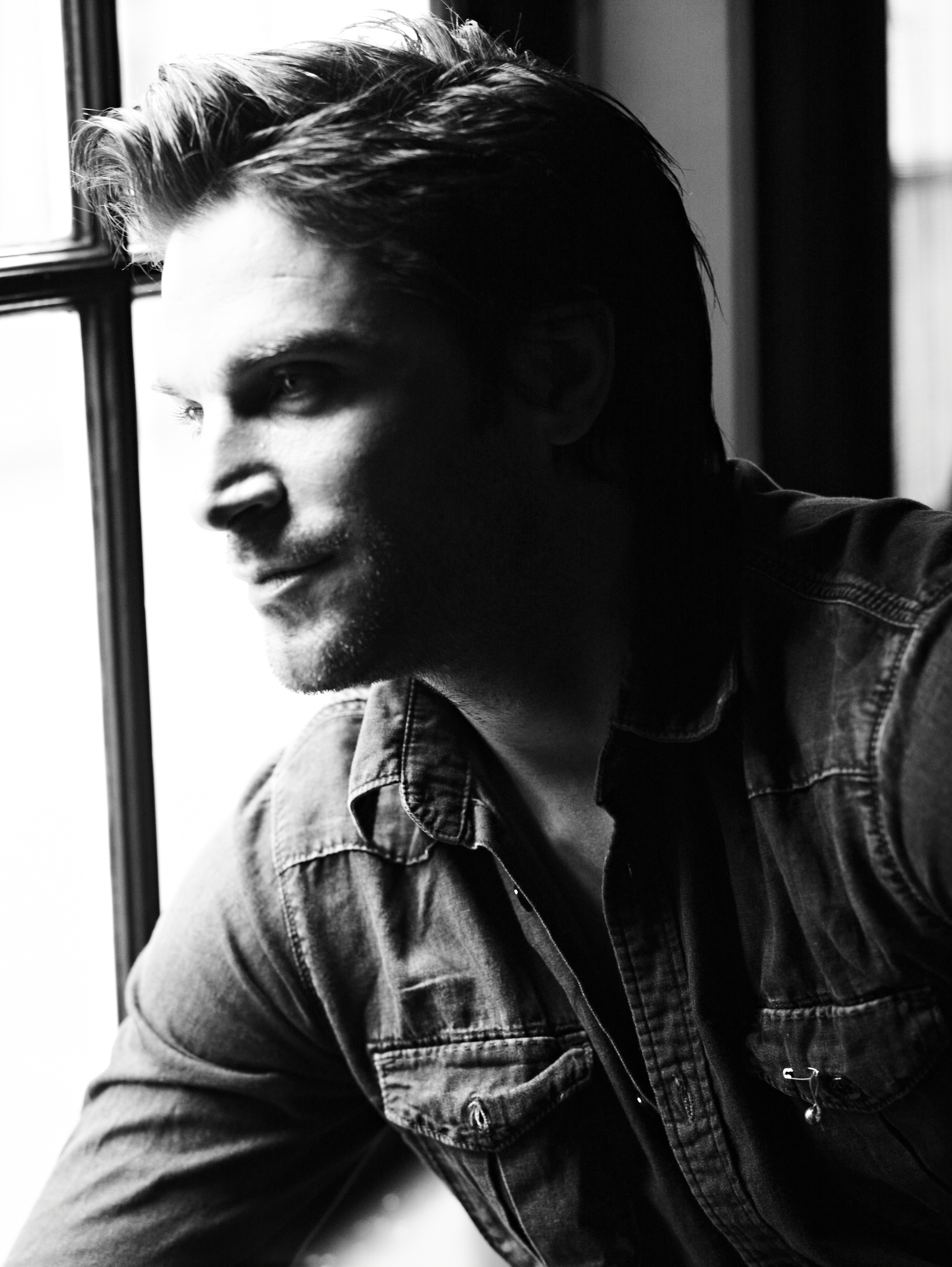

Background information
- Born: Alexander Serge de Buisonjé; 19 July 1973 (age 53); Voorburg, Netherlands
- Genres: Pop
- Years active: 1992–present
- Website: www.xanderdebuisonje.nl

Alexander Serge de Buisonjé (born 19 July 1973) is a Dutch singer who performs in Dutch and English. He is also a TV presenter best known for presenting Vrienden van Amstel LIVE! (2010) and Vrienden van Amstel zingen Kroonjuwelen (2012), which had a similar format but focused on performing songs of kroonjuweel calibre. He also presented Studio 9, where an artist would be sequestered for 36 hours along with a mystery artist from an entirely different genre, in order to create a brand new song together.

== Discography ==
=== Albums ===
Studio albums

Year	Album	Chart peak (NED)	Certification
2003	Hemelsbreed	25	
2005	Success	50	
2010	Out of Love	9	

Live albums

Year	Album	Chart peak (NED)	Certification
2004	Live and acoustic	73	
2012	Xander in Concert	1	

=== Singles ===
Year	Single	Chart peak (NED)	Certification	Album
2003	"Ik zie" / "Helden"	21		
2003	"Ik zie" / "Helden"	92		
2005	"Waarom?"	21		
2006	"Dit is mijn stem (Casser la voix)" (feat. Patrick Bruel)	64		
2010	"Een brief"	45		
2010	"Hou van mij"	80		
2011	"Dit is jouw dag"	14		
2011	"Als je slaapt"	20		
2012	"Life"	80		
2012	"De wereld redden"	5		
