= Wolter Kroes =

Dutch singer

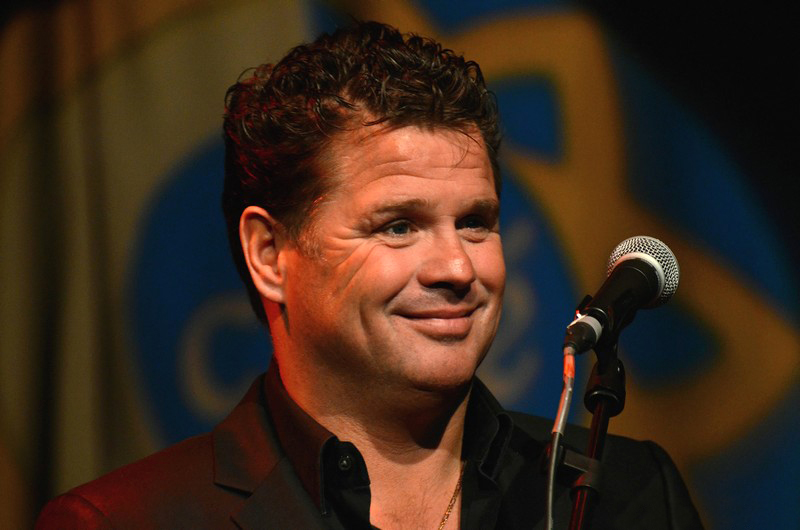

Background information
- Born: December 24, 1968 (age 56); Wormerveer, Netherlands
- Genres: Pop, Light music
- Occupation: Singer
- Years active: 1994 – present
- Website: www.wolterkroes.nl

Wolter Kroes (born in Wormerveer, Netherlands on 24 December 1968) is a Dutch singer. He is best known for his hits Ik heb de hele nacht liggen dromen, Niet normaal and his hit single Viva Hollandia that reached #1 in the Dutch Top 40 in 2008.

== Discography ==
=== Albums ===
(Peak position in Dutch Albums Chart)

- 1994: Laat me los (#58)
- 1998: De wereld in (-)
- 2000: Niemand anders (#67)
- 2000 Jij Bent Alles Voor Mij (-)
- 2002: 24 Uur per dag (#56)
- 2005: Laat me zweven (#8)
- 2006: Langzaam (#7)
- 2008: Echt niet normaal! (#15)
- 2011: Feest met Wolter Kroes (#89)
- 2011: Tussen jou en mij (#11)
- 2016: Formidabel (#15)

Live albums

- 2003: Het beste Live (#96)
- 2005: Live in Ahoy (#32)

=== Singles ===
(Selective. Peak positions in Dutch Singles Chart in parentheses)

- 1995: "Laat me los" (#38)
- 2000: "Jij bent alles voor mij" (#37)
- 2005: "Laat me zweven" (#30)
- 2007: "Niet normaal" (#4)
- 2008: "Donker om je heen" (#14)
- 2008: "Viva Hollandia" (EK 2008 versie) (#1) (on occasion of UEFA Euro 2008)
- 2010: "Viva Hollandia" (WK 2010 versie) (#21) (on occasion of the 2010 FIFA World Cup)
- 2012: "Ben je ook voor Nederland? - De geluksvogeltjesdans" (#3)
- 2017: "Vannacht" met StukTV

== DVDs ==
- 2003: Wolter Kroes Live in concert in de Heineken Music Hall
- 2005: Live in Ahoy
- 2006: Uit en thuis - Documentary film about Wolter Kroes
