= Claudia de Breij =

Dutch DJ, singer and comedian

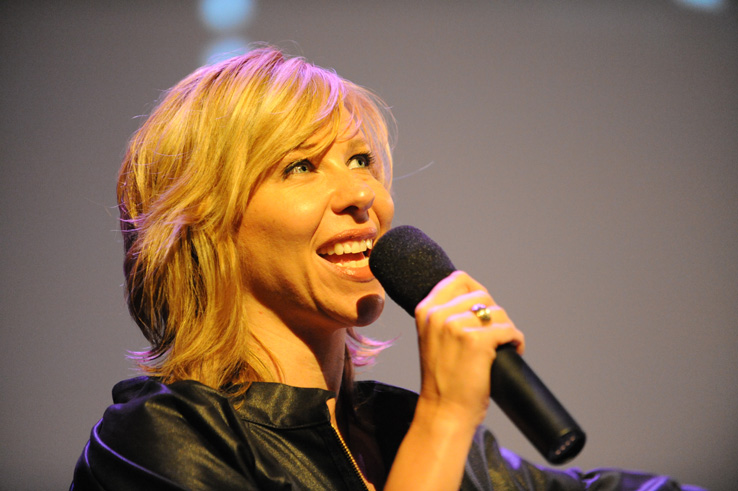
- Born: 13 March 1975 (age 51); Utrecht, Netherlands
- Occupations: Comedian, singer, show host, songwriter, radio disk-jockey
- Years active: 1997–present
- Notable work: Hete Vrede, Mag Ik Dan Bij Jou, Claudia D’r Op (3FM), Claudia’s Showboot, Thank God it’s Friday

Claudia de Breij (born 13 March 1975) is a Dutch comedian, singer, show host and radio disk jockey.

In 2010, she won the Dutch Poelifinario prize for best cabaret program.
