= Jan Smit (singer) =

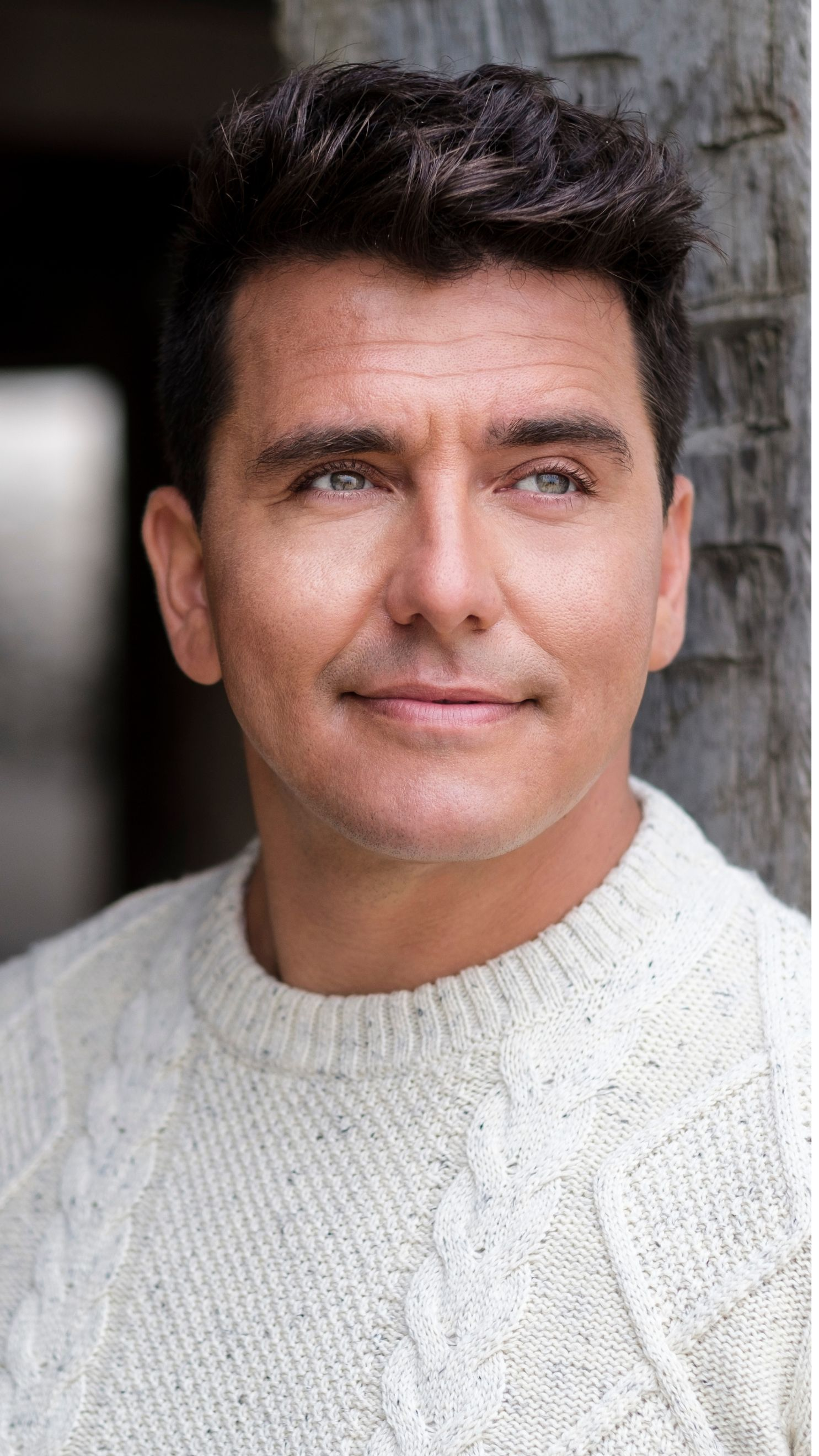
- Smit in 2022

Background information
- Also known as: Jantje Smit
- Born: Johannes Harco Smit; 31 December 1985 (age 40)
- Origin: Volendam, The Netherlands
- Genres: Pop, schlager, palingsound
- Occupation: Singer
- Years active: 1996–present
- Website: www.jansmit.com

Jan Smit (born 31 December 1985) is a Dutch singer, television host, and actor. Smit mostly sings songs in the Dutch language, in a genre known as palingsound. In addition to his solo career, in 2015 Smit joined the schlager trio Klubbb3, and in 2017 the Toppers. As a TV presenter, he has worked on programs like the Beste Zangers (Best Singers in the Netherlands) and Sterren Muziekfeest op het Plein (Music Festival on the square.) Since 1999, Smit has been serving as an ambassador for the SOS Children's Villages.

== Career ==
=== 1996–2004: International success as Jantje Smit ===
Jantje Smit began his music career in Volendam where he sang in a boys' choir called De Zangertjes van Volendam. Smit was discovered at the age of ten, when the famous Dutch band BZN asked him to participate in a duet with one of their lead singers, Carola Smit. They recorded the song Mama which was very successful.

Because of this success, he was asked to record a solo song, which was produced by three members of BZN, titled Ik Zing Dit Lied Voor Jou Alleen (I sing this song just for you). The song entered the Dutch charts at number one, something that had never before happened in the history of the Dutch Charts (Nederlandse Top 40). In the following two years, Jantje Smit had five more hits including Pappie, Waar Blijf Je Nou (Daddy, where are you now). All songs were written by BZN members Jan Keizer, Jack Veerman and Jan Tuijp.

Smit was also able to achieve success outside of the Netherlands, in Belgium, Germany, Austria, Italy and France. For a while Smit focused on and performed more often in Germany, where working legislation for minors was less strict, therefore allowing him to perform more. In the Netherlands minors can only perform a couple of times a year. While performing in Germany, he became one of the best-selling Dutch acts abroad. He released ten records sung in German. In 2001 Smit, BZN and their producers received the Exportprijs for being the bestselling Dutch artists abroad.

=== 2005: Just Jan Smit ===
In 2005 Smit changed his stage name from Jantje Smit to Jan Smit. Starting on 25 March 2005, he appeared in his own reality show Gewoon Jan Smit (Just Jan Smit), which was a reality TV show and followed his everyday life. Later that year, the show won the Gouden Televizier-Ring (Golden Television Ring). Smit started focusing more on being a presenter, and alongside Belle Pérez, he presented the TROS program Muziekfeest op het Plein (Music Festival on the Square). In the next few years Smit's popularity grew with successful singles, including songs like Als de Nacht Verdwijnt (When the Night Disappears), and Laura, which reached number one in the Single Top 100.

On 15 March 2006, Jan Smit was awarded the Edison Award in the Amsterdam Melkweg as Best National Singer for his album Jansmit.com. On 8 September 2006 the second season of Gewoon Jan Smit (Just Jan Smit) launched. In this season, unlike the first one, most of the attention focused on the singer's environment.

In 2006 Jan Smit had his third and fourth number one hits on the Dutch charts. Als de Morgen is Gekomen (When the morning has arrived), stayed on top of the chart for 6 weeks, and in December Cupido also reached number one.

In September 2006, C & A stores started including a clothing line named after Jan Smit. The collection was called J-style and revolved around some of his personal clothing choices.

In 2007, Smit had his fifth number one hit with Op Weg Naar Geluk (On the road to happiness). At the end of September 2007, Smit returned to television with a new reality TV show titled Jan Smit, de Zomer Voorbij (Jan Smit, After the Summer).

In the autumn of 2007 Jan Smit released a new single titled Dan Volg Je Haar Benen (Then you follow her legs). The single hit the charts in November, and became his sixth number one hit in the Netherlands. The single also contained a song called Calypso, which is a duet with US singer John Denver. In 2008, Smit went on tour in the Netherlands. The tour was called Jan Smit Komt Naar Je Toe (Jan Smit comes to you).

=== 2007: Vocal problems ===
In mid-October it was announced that Smit could not perform at least until the end of November. He had a health issue with his vocal cords. All performances were cancelled until 29 November. Because of his health issues, Smit missed his scheduled performances at Symphonica in Rosso and the TMF Awards, but he did appear to receive the award for best Dutch pop-act at this event. In November, Smit underwent a surgery, and he was not allowed to sing for half a year. This meant that both his work as a presenter for TROS pocket and his new album were put on hold. The tour Jan Smit komt naar je toe (Jan Smit comes to you) was also rescheduled.

After eight months out of the public eye, Smit made his comeback at the Museumpleinconcert (Museum Square Concert) on Koninginnedag (Queen's Day) in 2008.

=== 2008–2015: The Bombardment and 15th anniversary ===
On 14 July 2008 Smit released his single Stilte in de Storm (Silence in the storm) which entered the Single Top 100 at the top spot. It was his seventh number-one song. In the fall of 2008 he was featured in a new season of Jan Smit, de Zomer Voorbij (Jan Smit, After the Summer), and was chosen as team captain in the program Te Leuk Om Waar Te Zijn (Too cute to be Real). On 8 November 2008, Als je Lacht (When you smile) was released and became his 8th number 1 hit in the Netherlands was. On 28 February 2009 his 9th number 1 hit was Je Naam in de Sterren (Your name in the stars).

Although Smit's popularity kept growing in The Netherlands, his popularity in Germany waned. Smit blamed this on the fact that the German audience prefers true Schlager music or pop music, while Smit's style is something in between, which the Germans were not keen on. In the meantime, Smith stopped presenting television programs. In July 2009 he released a duet with Surinamese singer Damaru (singer) titled Mi Rowsu (Tuintje in mijn hart), released to benefit SOS Children's Villages. The song reached the number one spot in both The Netherlands as well as Suriname.

On 3 September 2009 Smit presented for the TROS the first episode of the program Ik Weet Wat Jij Deed (I know what you did). In addition, the third season of Jan Smit, de Zomer Voorbij (Jan Smit, After the Summer) premiered on 20 September 2009. This time the series was shot in Italy. Smit's next single Leef Nu Het Kan (Live while you can) entered the Single Top 100 at the number one spot on 6 March 2010. After The Beatles and Marco Borsato, Smit is the artist that has been the longest at number 1 in The Netherlands in the history of the weekly charts (1960–present). In April 2010, Smit was elected to be the Dutch mascot for Amarula. Smit's single Terug in de Tijd (Back in the Days) of his album Leef (Live) entered the charts on 19 June 2010 and reached the second position a week later, its highest position. His next song, Zie Wel Hoe Ik Thuis Kom (I will figure out how to get home) reached number one on 25 September 2010 in the Dutch Single Top 100. On 15 January 2011 his song Niemand Zo Trots Als Wij (No one as proud as we are) entered the charts at number one. On 30 September 2011 Smit released Hou Je Dan Nog Steeds Van Mij (Will you still love me then) and a month later the collection 15 Jaar Hits (15 years of hits). The single again reached the highest position in the Top 100 after just one week. During the RTL-4 program Koffietijd Smit received a gold record for selling 10,000 copies. Eddy Veerman released a biography, titled Het Geheim van de Smit (The Secret of Smit).

From 2011, he and Cornald Maas were commentators for the Eurovision Song Contest on behalf of the AVROTROS.

In 2012 Jan Smit celebrated his 15th anniversary of being in show business. In August, he released the album Vrienden (Friends), which was awarded a platinum record. Smit also had three number one hits in 2012: 1. Echte Vrienden (True Friends), a duet with Gerard Joling, 2. the song Altijd Daar (Always There) and 3. Sla Je Armen Om Me Heen (Wrap your arms around me), a duet with Roos van Erkel. As part of the anniversary celebration Smit performed five concerts in Rotterdam Ahoy, with guest appearances by Gerard Joling, Yes-R, Carola Smit and Damaru. In 2012 a biography was published chronicling Jan Smit's life. Towards the end of 2012 he starred in the film Het Bombardement (The Bombardment). On the day the film was released both critics and audiences panned the movie, but it was noted that Smits acting debut "was the least of the problems of the whole movie". However, since more than one hundred thousand people went to see the film in the cinema it still managed to be awarded with a golden film status.

Since 2012 Smit has been the presenter of De Beste Zangers van Nederland (The Best Singers of The Netherlands). Each episode features a central singer, who selects songs for other participants to sing. The featured singers do not perform themselves, but instead judge the other singers. On 4 June 2016 there was a special edition of the program, the featured guest was not one of the singers, but Smit himself. This episode was a tribute to Jan Smit because he was celebrating his 20-year anniversary of being in show business. In 2012 Smit launched the record label Vosound Records together with Jaap Buijs. Other artists on the label are Smit's sister Monique Smit, Tim Douwsma and Gerard Joling. Additionally in 2012 Smit was awarded the TrosKompas Oeuvre Award.

At the end of February 2013 Smit published the DVD and double CD and DVD Live in Ahoy, Jubilee Concert 2012. On 17 March 2013 Jan returned to German television after a seven-year absence. In the ARD program Das Frühlingsfest der 100,000 Blüten Smit presented his single "Bleiben wie du bist" (Stay who you are). After the TV appearance the single was available to download for free download for 48 hours. After six minutes, the site crashed due to the amount of requests. A list of hit songs called "Volendammer Top 1000" was created by a large number of local television and radio stations in Northern Holland, in which Smit had more than 70 entries.

In 2011, Smith had three nights at the Amsterdam Arena during Toppers in Concert 2013. In 2014, Smith played a supporting role in Cops Maastricht.

In 2015 Jaap Buijs died. Because of this, Smit skipped a season of hit show De Zomer Voorbij (Passed the Summer) as well as presenting Muziekfeest of het Plein (Music Festival on the Square) in Heerenveen (broadcast on 14 and 18 August) which instead was presented by Frans Duijts since this episode was recorded in the week Jaap Buijs died and Jan Smit did not consider it appropriate to stand on a square full of people in party-mode. In November 2015 Smit released a new Christmas album. The album titled Kerst Voor Iedereen (Christmas For Everyone) contains eight Christmas classics and four new Christmas songs.

=== 2016–present: KLUBBB3, Toppers and Eurovision Song Contest ===
==== Solo career ====
In 2016 Smit celebrated being in show business for 20 years. He started touring the country in September with his Elfsteden Tour (Eleven City Tour). In 2017 he released the DVD Live in HMH. His jubilee album 20 made it to number 1 in the Album Top 100. He was set to present the show Gouden Televizier-Ring Gala, but he withdrew from the engagement because he was nominated for one of the awards for his contribution to Beste Zangers. In March 2018 he appeared for the first time in his career at the Sportpaleis in Antwerp. He released his new album Met Andere Woorden (In Other Words) on 20 September 2018. For this album he invited several famous Dutch artists to write song for him, including Jan Keizer (singer), Barry Hay, Guus Meeuwis, BLØF and Frank Boeijen. He supported the project with a theater tour through The Netherlands and Flanders.

==== Klubbb3 ====
Smit worked on resurrecting his career in Germany for a third time. Jaap Buijs' last project before he died was to include Smit in a schlager trio with German Florian Silbereisen and Flemish singer Christoff De Bolle called Klubbb3. The debut album Vorsicht unzensiert! reached the top 10 in Germany, Austria and Belgium and also charted in the Netherlands and Switzerland. The debut single Du schaffst das schon reached the charts in several countries. On 10 January 2016 the band was awarded the smago! Award, an important prize in Germany schlager music. On 7 January 2017 they were awarded the prize Die Eins der Besten in the category Band des Jahres (Group of the Year). The award was presented during the ARD-televisieshow Schlager-Champions – Das große Fest der Besten. In early 2017 when they released their album Jetzt Geht's Los Richtig it entered the charts in Germany at number 1, number 2 in Austria and number 3 in Switzerland. Their Dutch single Het Leven Danst Sirtaki (Life Dances the Sirtaki), reached number 1 in the Single Top 100 after their performance on RTL Late Night. In May 2017 during Schlager Countdown – Das Große Premier Fest the trio received a platinum record for their first album Vorsicht Unsensiert and a gold record for their second album Jetzt Geht's Los Richtig!. From March 2017 KLUBBB3 toured with Das Grosse Schlager Fest – Die Party des Jahres (The Party of the Year) through Germany, Austria and Belgium.

==== The Toppers ====
The Toppers is one of the most successful vocal band in the Netherlands, consisting of René Froger, Jeroen van der Boom, and Gerard Joling. They have performed a series of concerts every year since 2005 in the Amsterdam ArenA. During performances the De Toppers repertoire, consists mostly of a mix of covers and original material. In 2011 Gordon joined the group.

In 2011 and 2013, Smit was a guest artist for the Toppers in Concert series for six nights in the Amsterdam ArenA.

In September 2016 Smit spoke on radio 100% NL about his love for the Toppers. Smit also indicated if any of the Toppers' men were to leave the group, he'd be willing to take over. A few hours later, Jeroen van der Boom posted a video on Facebook that he and Gerard Joling supposedly had auditioned Jan Smit for the Toppers.

On 21 February 2017 it was announced that Smit would join De Toppers as a member. In the Toppers in Concert – Wild West, Home Best Edition Smit was gradually introduced to become a full member of the group.

==== Television work ====
Smit has hosted shows for the TV station TROS. He has also been one of the commentators for Dutch TV alongside Cornald Maas for the Eurovision Song Contest. On 4 December 2019, it was announced that he would be one of the three presenters of the Eurovision Song Contest 2020 in Rotterdam alongside Chantal Janzen and Edsilia Rombley. Eurovision 2020 was later cancelled due to the COVID-19 pandemic. On 16 May 2020, the planned date of the Eurovision final, an alternative program was broadcast called Eurovision: Europe Shine a Light. The program was broadcast in 46 countries, and was hosted by Smit, Janzen and Rombley. Smit was later confirmed to host the 2021 contest, alongside Janzen, Rombley, and Nikkie de Jager, which was broadcast in May 2021. He was also part of the selection committee for the Dutch entry to the Eurovision Song Contest 2022.

Smit was a coach on The Voice of Holland on its 2020–2021 season. He was replaced by Glennis Grace the next season.

== Personal life ==
Smit has two sisters, one of whom, Monique, like her brother, sings Dutch songs.

From 2007 to 2009, he was in a relationship with actress and presenter Yolanthe Cabau. He lived with Cabau van Kasbergen for several months. Since 2009, Smit has been in a relationship with Liza Plat. The two got married on 11 November 2011 on the island of Sint Maarten. Smit and Plat have two children, a daughter and a son. The couple divorced on 13 March 2026.

In December 2013, Smit joined the board of FC Volendam. He was responsible for the general affairs of the club. and als was club president for a brief period.

On 24 April 2020 he received the honor of being an Officier in de Orde van Oranje-Nassau.

== Discography ==
=== Albums ===
Album title	Release date	Charting in the Dutch Album Top 100			Comments
Album title	Release date	Date of entry	Highest	Weeks	Comments
Ik zing dit lied voor jou alleen	1997	10 May 1997	1(5wk)	41	als Jantje Smit / 2× Platinum
Kerstmis met Jantje Smit	1997	29 November 1997	4	7	als Jantje Smit / Gold
Het land van mijn dromen	1998	30 May 1998	2	22	als Jantje Smit / Gold
Jantje Smit	1999	1 May 1999	7	15	als Jantje Smit
2000	2000	3 June 2000	32	7	
Zing en lach	2001	6 October 2001	33	8	
Zonder jou	2002	21 September 2002	40	8	
Op eigen benen	2003	4 October 2003	45	15	
Jansmit.com	22 April 2005	30 April 2005	1(3wk)	105	3× Platinum
Op weg naar geluk	15 September 2006	23 September 2006	1(7wk)	101	3× Platinum / Bestverkocht album van het jaar 2006
Stilte in de storm	29 August 2008	6 September 2008	1(2wk)	61	3× Platinum
Live '09: Jan Smit komt naar je toe Tour 08/09	1 May 2009	9 May 2009	5	20	Livealbum / Platinum
Leef	26 March 2010	3 April 2010	1(1wk)	58	Platinum
15 jaar hits	28 October 2011	5 November 2011	3	65	Verzamelalbum
Vrienden	10 August 2012	18 August 2012	1(4wk)	48	Gold
Live in Ahoy: Jubileumconcert 2012	28 February 2013	2 March 2013	1(2wk)	16	Livealbum
Ich bin da	28 June 2013	6 July 2013	13	6	Duitstalig album
Unplugged: De Rockfield Sessies	25 October 2013	26 October 2013	1(1wk)	26	Gold
Jij & ik	22 August 2014	30 August 2014	1(3wk)	29	Gold
Recht uit m'n hart – ballades	2015	7 February 2015	1(2wk)	28	Verzamelalbum
Kerst voor iedereen	6 November 2015	15 November 2015	4	8	Platinum
Vorsicht unzensiert!	8 January 2016	16 January 2016	33	2	in de formatie Klubbb3
20	20 September 2016	24 September 2016	1(1wk)	17	
Jetzt geht's richtig los!	6 January 2017	14 January 2017	24	5	in de formatie Klubbb3
20 jaar hits	3 November 2017	11 November 2017	8	7	Verzamelalbum
Wir werden immer mehr!	12 January 2018	20 January 2018	14	2	in de formatie Klubbb3
Toppers in concert 2018	24 August 2018	1 September 2018	10	4	in de formatie De Toppers
Met andere woorden	20 September 2018	29 September 2018	1(1wk)	15	
Toppers in concert 2019	2019	6 September 2018	16	1	in de formatie De Toppers

Awards and achievements
Preceded by (Israel) Erez Tal, Bar Refaeli, Assi Azar and Lucy Ayoub (2019)	Eurovision Song Contest presenter 2021; With: Edsilia Rombley, Chantal Janzen and Nikkie de Jager	Succeeded by (Italy) Alessandro Cattelan, Laura Pausini and (United Kingdom) Mika
