= Christoff =

Christoff is both a given name and a surname. Notable people with the name include:

Given name

- Christoff Bryan (born 1996), Jamaican high jumper
- Christoff De Bolle (born 1976), known by the mononym Christoff, Belgian Flemish schlager singer and radio presenter
- Christoff Van Heerden (born 1985), South African racing cyclist

Middle name

- Hans Christoff von Königsmarck (1605–1663), Swedish-German soldier

Surname

- A. J. Christoff (born 1948), American football coach
- Boris Christoff (1914–1993), Bulgarian opera singer
- Stefan Christoff, Canadian journalist, community organizer and musician
- Steve Christoff (born 1958), American ice hockey player

== See also ==
- Christoff Cliff, rocky cliff forming Aytos Point on the coast of Bransfield Strait, eastern Livingston Island in the South Shetland Islands, Antarctica
