= Jan Keizer =

Jan Keizer may refer to:

- Jan Keizer (referee) (1940-2024), Dutch referee
- Jan Keizer (singer) (born 1949), Dutch singer and composer
