= Mon amour (BZN song) =

"Mon Amour" is a 1976 French-language song by Dutch pop group BZN. Released in September, as Negram - Netherlands - NG 2141, it was the band's breakthrough and first #1 chart hit, the second being "Pearly Dumm" in 1980. The song was written by Th. Tol and J. Keizer, produced by Roy Beltman, arranged by Gerard Stellaard. The B-side was a Th. Tol and J. Tuyp composition, "Memories". The song held at #1 hit parade ranking for five weeks. A video for the song showed Anny Schilder and drummer-turned-vocalist Jan Keizer singing the song to holidaymakers on a beach.
