= Carola Smit =

Dutch singer (born 1963)

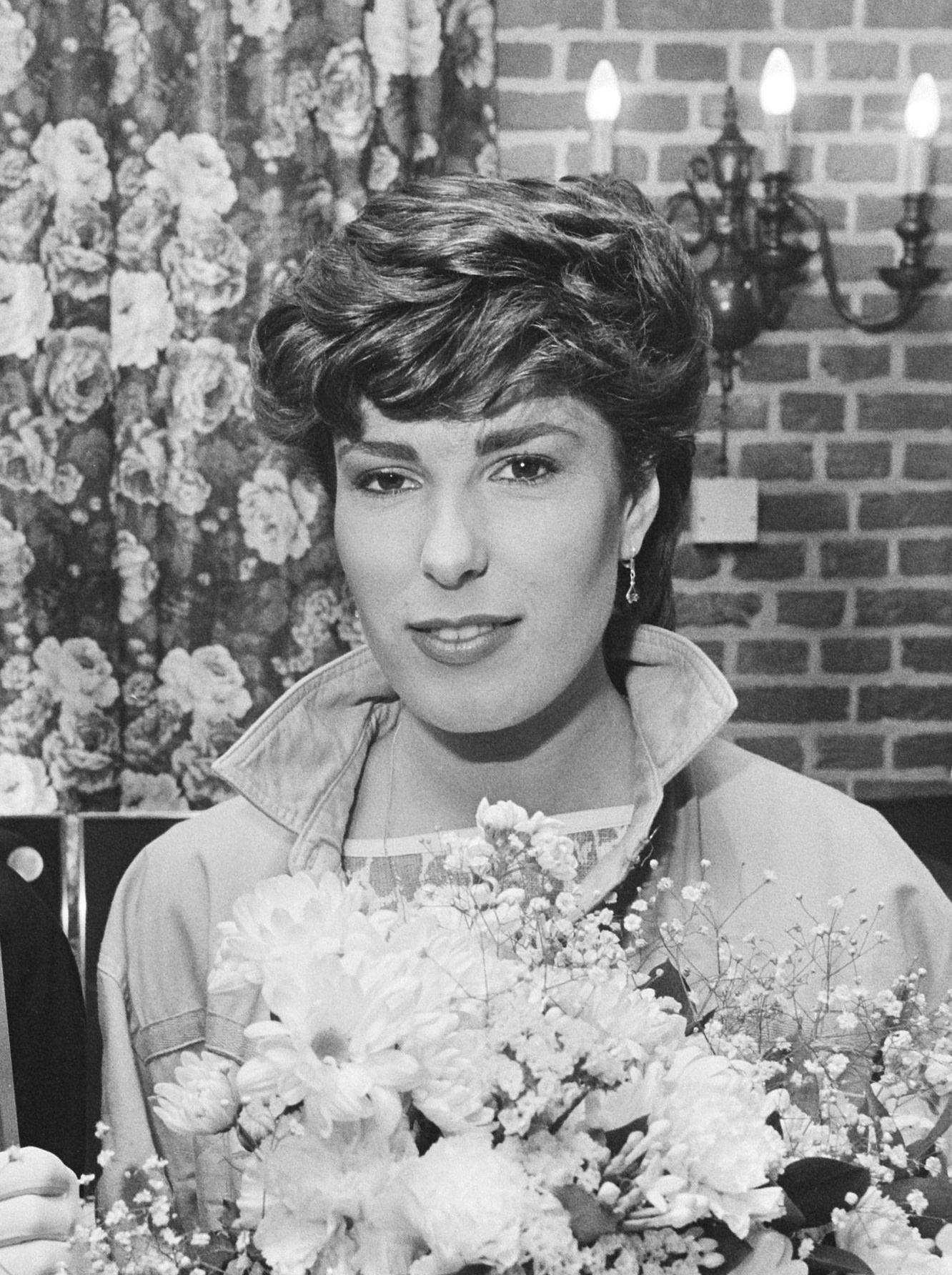
Carola Smit in 1984

Carola Sier-Smit (born 1 September 1963) is a Dutch singer and was a member of Dutch pop band BZN from 1984 until 2007 when the band disbanded.

== Biography ==
=== Musical career ===
Smit was born Volendam, and began her musical career in 1980 (at age 17), when she joined the band Double Trouble. When she was with that band, she released her first single Never Loved This Way Before. In 1982, she released her second single Tell Me. In 1983 the band was renamed Friends. At the same time, she was asked to join BZN to replace previous member Anny Schilder. This change was, however, kept secret. They recorded the song If I say the words and the album Reflections in secret, but the news of Schilder leaving BZN was leaked, and Schilder appeared on TV explaining her reasons for leaving the band. On 22 March 1984 BZN appeared for the first time on TV with Carola Smit in a TV special where Schilder presented Smit to the audience as her successor. The first performance of Smit with BZN on TV was on 2 April 1984 during the Ted Show. Smit remained the co-lead singer, with Jan Keizer (singer) of BZN until 2007 when the band announced they were to stop recording and performing.

=== Health Problems ===
On 20 April 1987, at age 23, Smit suffered a stroke, which left her paralyzed down her right side. It was big news on TV and in newspapers. Initially it looked like this would be the end of her singing career, but she quickly showed some signs of improvement, and she was able to leave the hospital after three weeks. She did several months of intensive rehabilitation, and on August 18 of the same year, Smit appeared on television with BZN, and was back on stage from October 17. Before her illness, Smit had performed gymnastics at a high amateur level for a long time, but her illness forced her to stop.

=== Solo career ===
When it was announced that BZN would disband, it was clear that Keizer was the driving force behind this, while Smit has tried to convince him to continue. This was reported in De Telegraaf.

Initially Smit indicated she would continue singing, and would form a band with BZN-keyboard player Dick Plat and guitarist Jan Stroek as Carola Smit & Friends. On 4 April 2008 Smit released her first solo-single titled With you (I'm in Heaven). The song entered the Download Top 10 of Radio Station 538 at number 1. She released an album on 24 April 2008 titled Carola Smit, which initially did well in the charts, but plummeted quickly.

In December 2008 she performed several Christmas concerts together with Danny Malando.

In 2009 she reposted via her website that she was ending her solo career with Carola Smit & Friends. She also announced she would only continue singing in an amateur band called Get Back Live.

In October 2012 Smit took part in the 15-jaar jubileumsconcerten for Jan Smit (singer) in Rotterdam Ahoy. Jan Smit started his career by singing a duet for BZN with Carola Smit in 1996 called Mama, which they performed together during these concerts.

In Spring 2014 Smit started performing again with Dick Plat in theaters. They presented a nostalgic song program, which is accompanied by historic images pertaining to world news from the 50s, 60s and 70s.

In 2018 Smit performed six concerts in theaters in the Dutch province Drenthe together with Dick Plat and René Karst. The concert is titled Letter voor Letter, and it focuses on learning how to read and write. In 2019/2020 they continued this show, this time in the Dutch province Overijssel.

== Link ==
- – The Official BZN Site
