= Monique Smit =

Dutch singer and television presenter

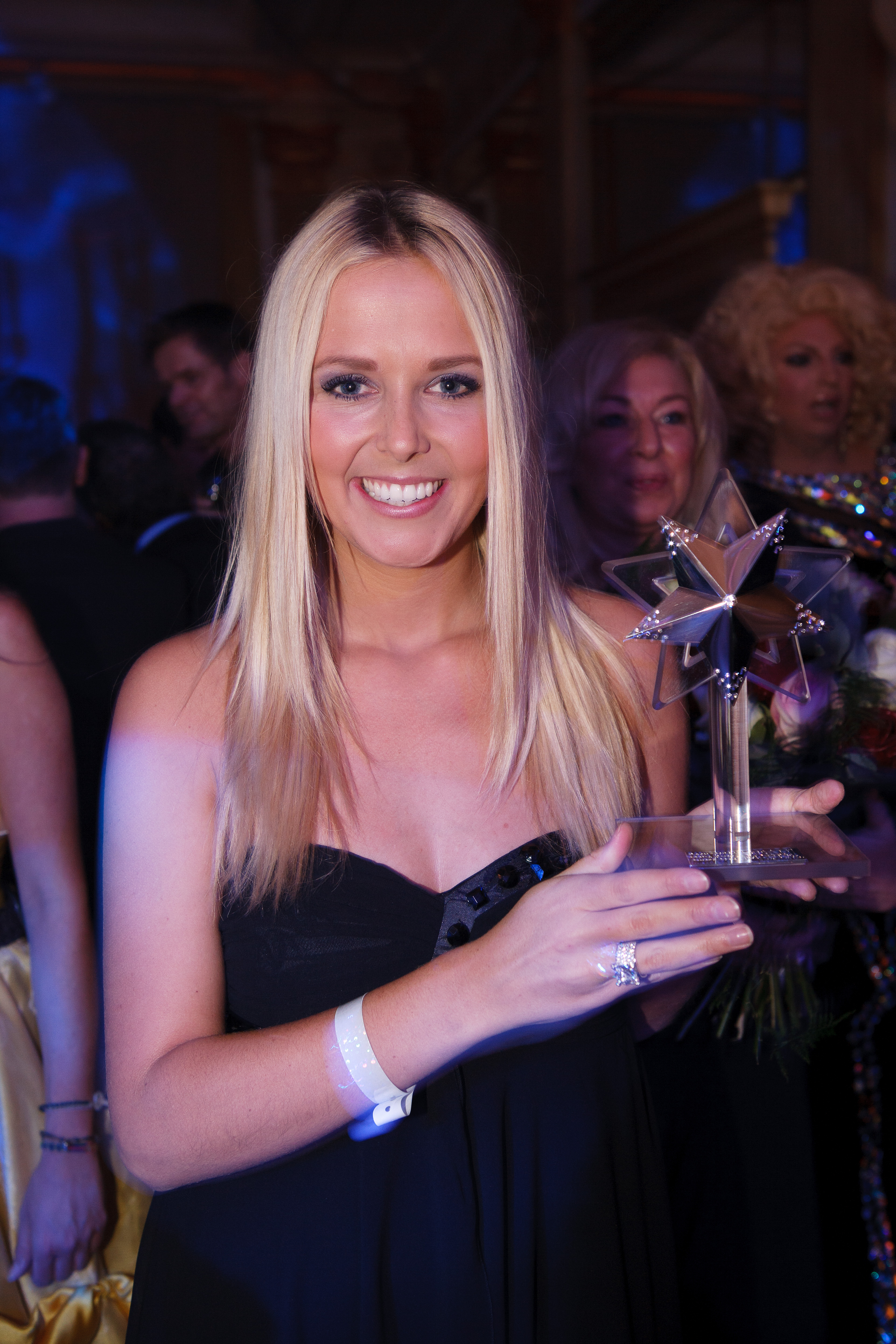
- Smit in 2010
- Born: Margaret Gertrude Mary Smit; April 9, 1989 (age 36); Volendam, Netherlands
- Occupations: Singer, television presenter

Margaret Gertrude Mary (Monique) Smit (born 9 April 1989) is a Dutch singer and television presenter.

== Early life ==
Monique grew up in Volendam as the younger sister of Jan Smit. After finishing school, she attended Don Bosco College, and later became a hairdresser.

== Career ==
Smit participated in her brother's reality series Gewoon Jan Smit. She presented the show Zapp Kids Top 20 for TROS and Wild van Muziek broadcast on Sterren 24.

She also appeared in the reality show Just the Two of Us in 2007 where she came in second and performed in a duet with Xander de Buisonjé. Smit debuted with her solo "Wild", which was in top five in 2007. One year later she released her first solo album Stel Je Voor, which contains singles like ""Vrouwenalfabet" and "Stel Je Voor".

Smit has released four music albums and several music singles. In 2023, she made headlines by inspiring a hate-campaign against Dutch poet Pim Lammers.

Smit was a contestant in the 2017 season of the show Het Perfecte Plaatje. She was a contestant in the 2018 cooking television show Superstar Chef in which duos composed of a celebrity and a chef compete against other duos to prepare the best dishes. In April 2023, she appeared in an episode of the television game show Alles is Muziek.

== Albums ==
- Stel je voor [limited edition] (2008)
- Verder [14 tracks] (2010)
- Grenzeloos (in partnership with Tim Douwsma) (2013)
- 2 kleine kleutertjes (2015)
- Sinterklaas is in het land (2016)
- Kerstliedjes (2017)
