= Klubbb3 =

Schlager music vocal trio

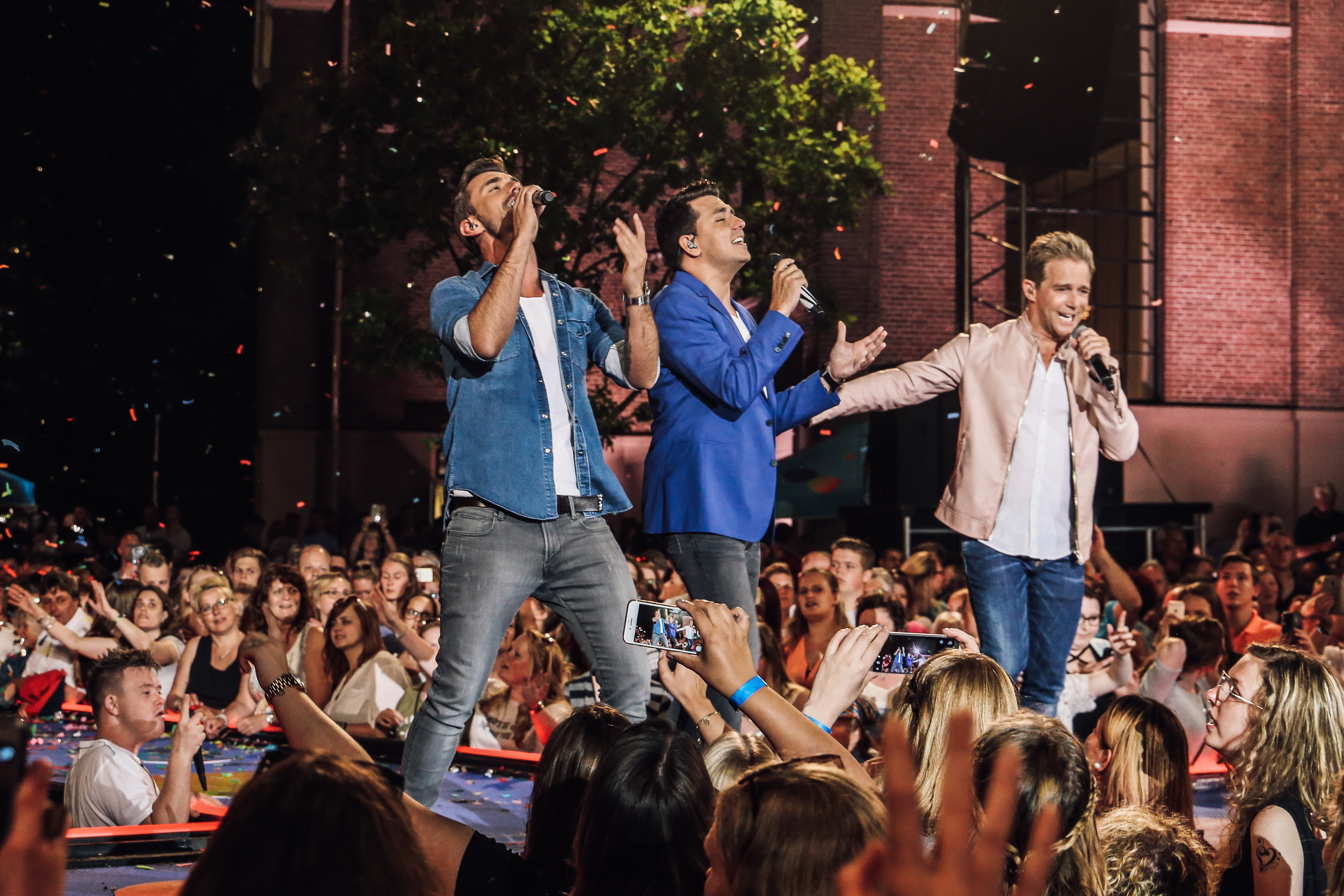

Background information
- Genres: Schlager
- Years active: 2015–2018
- Members: Florian Silbereisen (vocals); Jan Smit (vocals); Christoff De Bolle (vocals)
- Website: www.universal-music.de/klubbb3

Klubbb3 is an international Schlagerband, with the members being Schlager singers Florian Silbereisen (Germany), Jan Smit (Netherlands) and Christoff De Bolle (Belgium).

== Band History ==
In autumn 2015, Florian Silbereisen announced a band. According to their own information, the initiative came from the three singers themselves and without pressure from the record companies. Producer Tobias Reitz and songwriter Uwe Busse were hired. Their first single, Du schaffst das schon, reached #66 on the German singles chart. Finally, on 8 January 2016, their debut album Vorsicht unzensiert! was released, which ranked 4th in the German, 33rd in the Dutch and 6th in the Flemish album charts

== Members ==
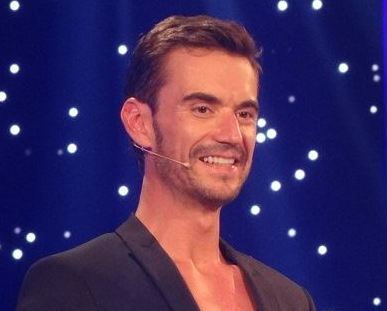
Florian Silbereisen

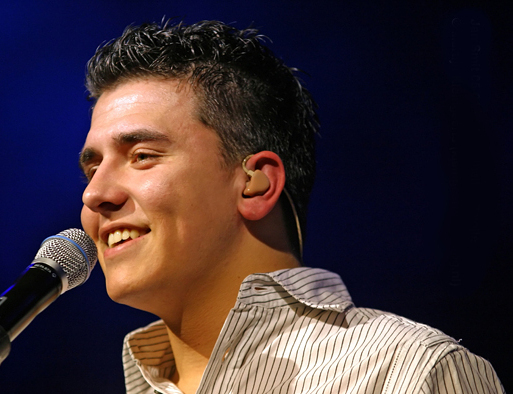
Jan Smit

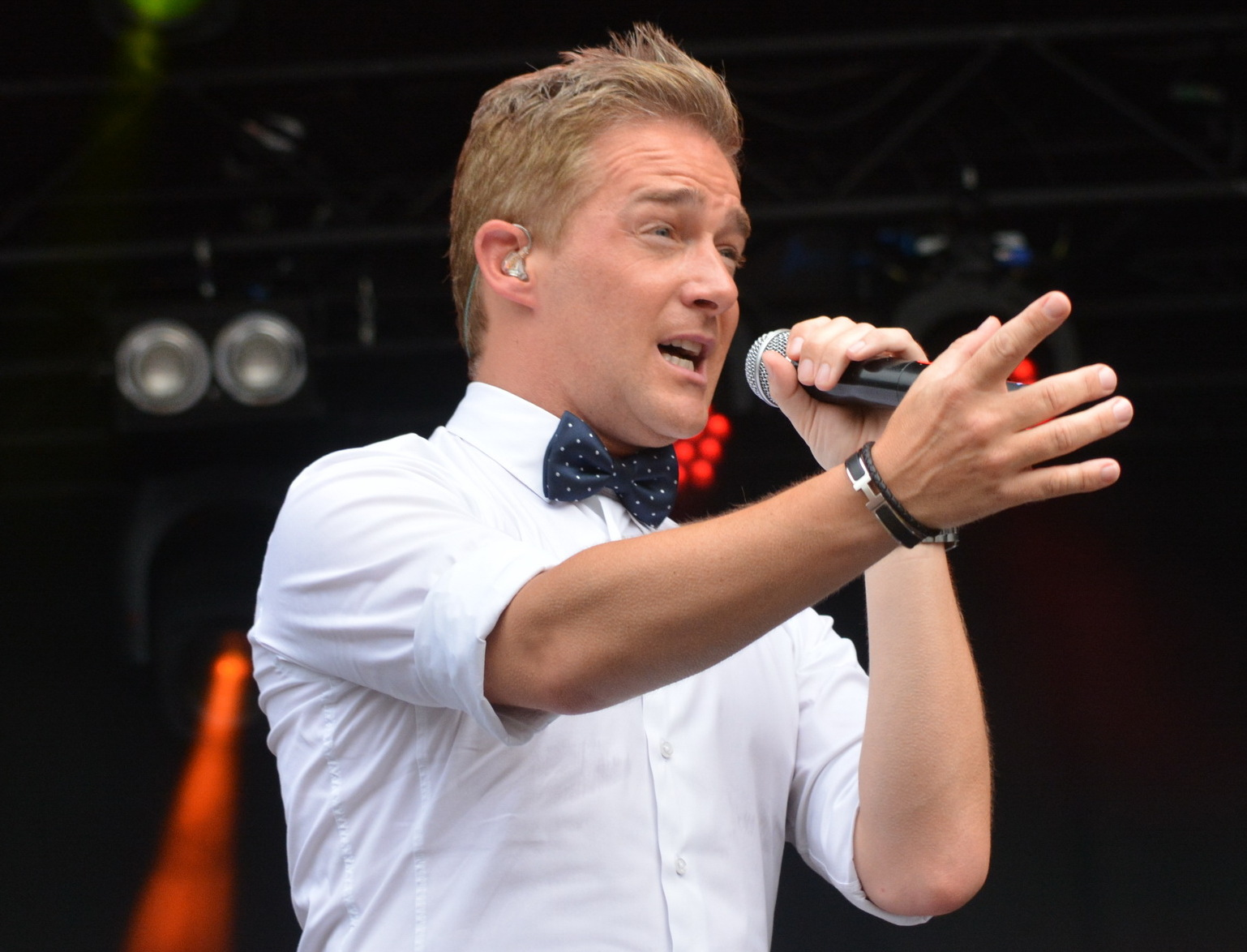
Christoff De Bolle

== Discography ==
| Album | German Chart Pos. | Austrian Chart Pos. | Swiss Chart Pos. | Dutch Chart pos. | Belgian Chart Pos. |
|---|---|---|---|---|---|
| Vorsicht unzensiert! | 4 (15/01/16) | 5 (22/01/16) | 15 (17/01/16) | 33 (16/01/16) | 6 (16/01/16) |
| Jetzt geht's richtig los! | 1 (13/01/17) | 2 (20/01/17) | 3 (15/01/17) | 24 (14/01/17) | 3 (14/01/17) |
| Wir werden immer mehr | 1 (19/01/18) | 2 (26/01/18) | 2 (21/01/18) | 14 (20/01/18) | 2 (20/01/18) |

Albums

- 2016: Vorsicht unzensiert! (Universal Music)
- 2017: Jetzt geht's richtig los! (Universal Music)
- 2018: Wir werden immer mehr! (Universal Music)

Singles

- 2016: Du schaffst das schon
- 2017: Jetzt erst recht!
- 2017: Märchenprinzen (with Gloria von Thurn und Taxis)

== Awards ==
- Die Eins der Besten (One of the Best)
  - 2017: in the category Band of the year
- smago! Award
  - 2016: in the Category Hit-Tip 2016 (Du schaffst das schon)
  - 2017: in the category most successful Schlager band in Europe.
  - 2017: Golden Ticket for "The Great Schlagerfest - The Party of the Year"
