= De Toppers =

Dutch musical group

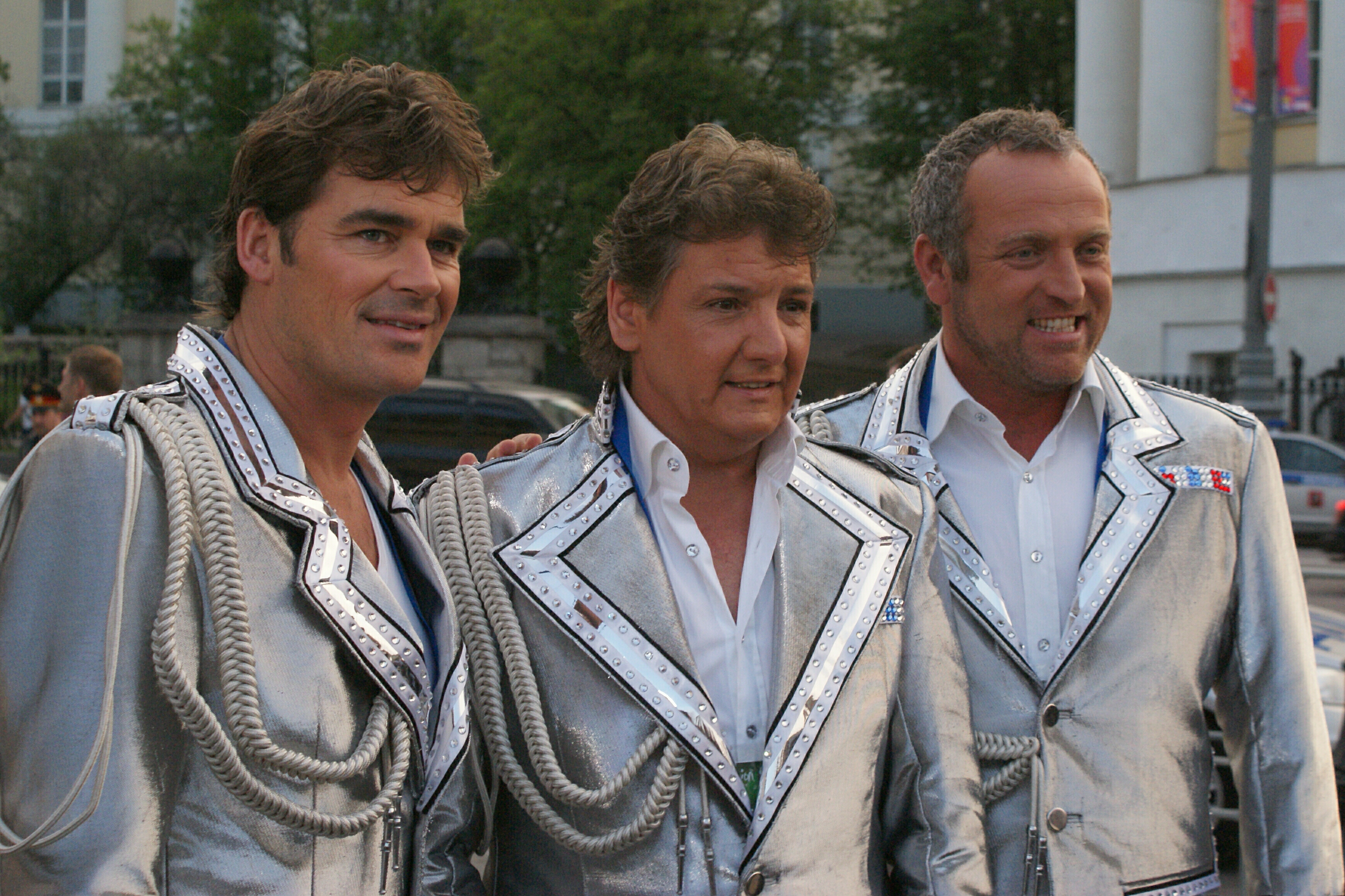
- Jeroen van der Boom, René Froger and Gordon Heuckeroth in 2009

Background information
- Also known as: The Toppers
- Origin: Netherlands
- Genres: Europop; disco; schlager
- Years active: 2005–present
- Label: EMI
- Members: Jeroen van der Boom; Gerard Joling; René Froger; Jan Smit
- Past members: Gordon Heuckeroth
- Website: www.toppersinconcert.nl

De Toppers (Dutch pronunciation: [də ˈtɔpərs]), also known internationally as the Toppers, is a Dutch supergroup, consisting of René Froger, Gerard Joling, Jeroen van der Boom and Jan Smit. Gordon Heuckeroth, one of the founding members, left the group in 2011. The group has performed a series of concerts every year since 2005 in the Johan Cruyff Arena. Their repertoire consists mainly of a mix of covers and original material. Toppers in Concert, with more than 40 sold-out shows, is the longest running concert series in the Benelux. In 2008, the Toppers were selected to represent the Netherlands in the Eurovision Song Contest 2009 held in Moscow, Russia, with the song "Shine". They failed to qualify for the final.

== History ==
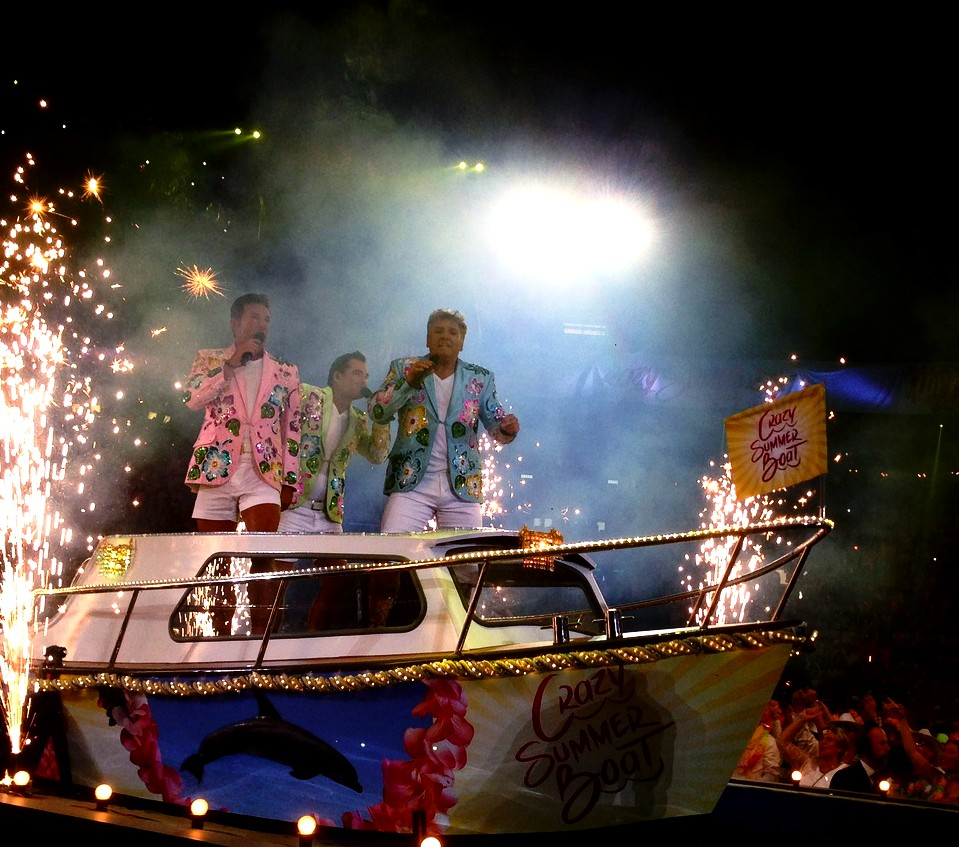
Opening Toppers in Concert 2015

Gerard Joling and Gordon Heuckeroth formed as a guest band in a Rene Froger concert, which turned into a successful concert series. In 2005, the first two concerts were held at the Johan Cruyff Arena. In 2008, Joling left the Toppers and was replaced by Jeroen van der Boom. In 2010, Joling re-joined the group. They performed as a quartet before Heuckeroth departed in 2011.

In September 2016, Jan Smit stated he was interested in joining the group. A few hours later, van der Boom posted a video on Facebook of himself and Joling "auditioning" to join the band. Smit's addition was formally announced on February 21, 2017.

In 2017, the Toppers received a Special Achievement Award, selling more than 1.5 million copies of Toppers in Concert (CD + DVD). During the 2018 edition, they broke the world record in Canon Singing with 198.000 spectators during three concerts.

=== Toppers in Concert ===
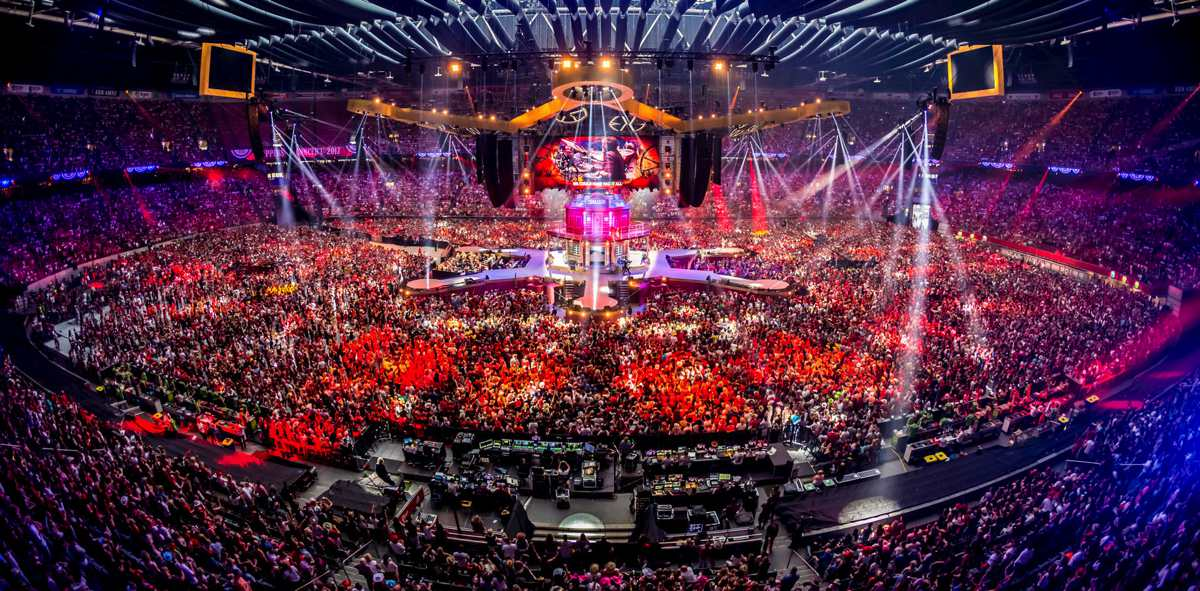
Johan Cruyff Arena

Toppers in Concert is an annual Dutch concert series by the Toppers, held in the Johan Cruyff Arena since 2005. Toppers in Concert is the longest running concert series in the Benelux. At the tenth edition in 2014, De Toppers welcomed their two millionth concert visitor. In 2016, the Toppers presented their first Christmas edition of Toppers in Concert in Rotterdam Ahoy.

== Members ==
René Froger
Gordon
Gordon
Gerard Joling
Gerard Joling
Jeroen van der Boom
Jan Smit
│
2005
│
2006
│
2007
│
2008
│
2009
│
2010
│
2011
│
2012
│
2013
│
2014
│
2015
│
2016
│
2017
│
2018
│
2019
│
2020
│
2021
│
2022
│
2023
│
2024
Timeline

== Concerts ==
Season	Formation				Date	Theme	Visitors	Location
2005	René	Gerard	Gordon		13 & 14 May	Live In The Round	120,000	Johan Cruyff Arena
2006	René	Gerard	Gordon		26, 27 & 28 May	The Largest Friendstemple	180,000	Johan Cruyff Arena
2007	René	Gerard	Gordon		1, 2, 3, 6, 7 & 8 June	Disco & Future	360,000	Johan Cruyff Arena
2008	René	Gerard	Gordon		23, 24 & 27 May	Glitter And Glamour	160,000	Johan Cruyff Arena
2009	René		Gordon	Jeroen	12 & 13 June	Toppers Anniversary 2009	120,000	Johan Cruyff Arena
2010	René	Gerard	Gordon	Jeroen	20, 21 & 22 May	Welcome To Heaven	180,000	Johan Cruyff Arena
2011	René	Gerard	Gordon	Jeroen	27, 28 & 29 May	The Royal Party For Kings And Queens	200,000	Johan Cruyff Arena
2012	René	Gerard		Jeroen	17, 18 & 19 May	The Love Boat Edition	200,000	Johan Cruyff Arena
2013	René	Gerard		Jeroen	24, 25 & 26 May	1001 Night Edition	204,698	Johan Cruyff Arena
2014	René	Gerard		Jeroen	24, 29, 30 & 31 May	10 Years Toppers Made in Holland	270,000	Johan Cruyff Arena
2015	René	Gerard		Jeroen	23, 24, 29, 30 & 31 May	Crazy Summer Edition	340,000	Johan Cruyff Arena
2016	René	Gerard		Jeroen	13, 14 & 15 May	Royal Night of Disco	210,000	Johan Cruyff Arena
2016	René	Gerard		Jeroen	10, 20, 21, 22, 23 & 24 December	Christmas Party of the Year - 12.5 anniversary	85,000	Rotterdam Ahoy
2017	René	Gerard		Jeroen	26 & 27 May	Wild West, Home Best	132,000	Johan Cruyff Arena
2018	René	Gerard	Jan	Jeroen	25, 26 & 27 May	Pretty in Pink, The Circus Edition	198,000	Johan Cruyff Arena
2019	René	Gerard	Jan	Jeroen	31 May & 1 June	Happy Birthday Party - 'The Best of' Jubileum Editie	130,000	Johan Cruyff Arena
2022	René	Gerard	Jan	Jeroen	18, 19 & 20 November	Happy Together - The Flower Power Edition	-	Johan Cruyff Arena
Total: 17 editions						Total: 56 concerts		Total: 2,614,698 visitors

== Work ==
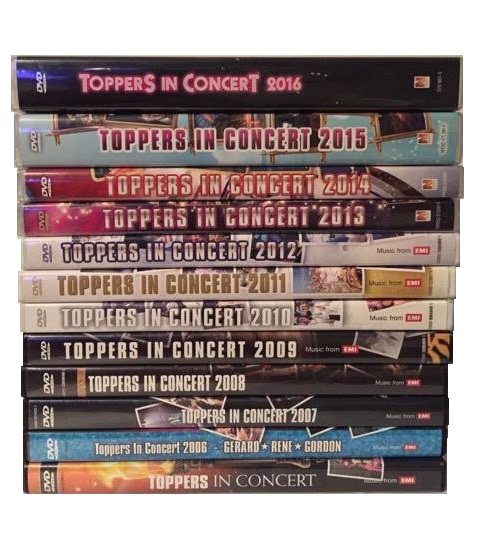
Toppers in Concert DVDs

=== Albums ===
Album title	Release date	Charting in the Dutch Album Top 100			Comments
Album title	Release date	Date of entry	Highest	Weeks	Comments
Toppers in concert	02-07-2005	09-07-2005	3	39	Platinum
Toppers in concert 2006	30-06-2006	08-07-2006	2	26	Platinum
Kerst met De Toppers	2006	-			10× Platinum
Toppers in concert 2007	11-07-2007	21-07-2007	1(1wk)	19	Platinum
Toppers in concert 2008	01-08-2008	09-08-2008	2	17	Platinum
Toppers in concert 2009	28-08-2009	05-09-2009	4	10	Platinum
Toppers in concert 2010	20-08-2010	21-08-2010	2	17	Platinum
Mega party mix - Volume 1	20-05-2011	28-05-2011	7	13	
Toppers in concert 2011	02-09-2011	10-09-2011	1(1wk)	23	Platinum
Mega party mix - Volume 2	09-03-2012	17-03-2012	19	9	
Toppers in concert 2012	07-09-2012	15-09-2012	2	24	3-CD, Platinum
Toppers in concert 2013	05-10-2013	12-10-2013	19	14	Platinum
Toppers in concert 2014	22-08-2014	30-08-2014	2	25	3-CD, Gold
Toppers in concert 2015	28-08-2015	05-09-2015	1(2wk)	20	3-CD, Gold
Toppers in concert 2016	26-08-2016	03-09-2016	3	10*	3-CD

=== Singles ===
Single title	Release date	Charting in the Dutch Top 40			Comments
Single title	Release date	Date of entry	Highest	Weeks	Comments
Live at the ArenA	2004	04-12-2004	5	8	No. 3 in the Single Top 100
Over de top!	12-04-2005	30-04-2005	22	5	No. 6 in the Single Top 100
Toppers party!	2005	16-07-2005	tip5	-	No. 32 in the Single Top 100
Wir sind die Holländer	2006	03-06-2006	18	5	as "Toppers voor Oranje" / No. 7 in the Single Top 100
Can you feel it?	11-06-2007	16-06-2007	8	5	with John Marks / No. 10 in the Single Top 100
Shine	16-02-2009	07-03-2009	15	8	No. 2 in the Single Top 100
1001 Nacht	05-04-2013	20-04-2013	tip9	-	No. 13 in the Single Top 100

Other singles	Date of appearance	Date of entry	Highest position	Number of weeks	Comments
Toppers Meezing Kerstmedley	2006	-	-	-	Album: Kerst met De Toppers
Sleigh Ride	2006	-	-	-	Album: Kerst met De Toppers
Have Yourself A Merry Little Christmas	2006	-	-	-	Album: Kerst met De Toppers
It May Be Winter Outside	2006	-	-	-	Album: Kerst met De Toppers
All I Want For Christmas Is You	2006	-	-	-	Album: Kerst met De Toppers
Do They Know It's Christmas	2006	-	-	-	Album: Kerst met De Toppers
Our Night	2009	-	-	-	Nationaal Songfestival / 6th place NSF
No One Loves Me Like You	2009	-	-	-	Nationaal Songfestival / 3rd place NSF
Angel Of The Night	2009	-	-	-	Nationaal Songfestival / 2nd place NSF
Everybody Can Be A Star	2009	-	-	-	Nationaal Songfestival / 5th place NSF
Three Is The Magic Number	2009	-	-	-	Nationaal Songfestival / 4th place NSF
Higher	2011	-	-	-	Toppers in concert 2011
Topper Van Je Eigen Leven	2012	-	-	-	Toppers in concert 2012
Moves Like Toppers	2012	-	-	-	Toppers in concert 2012
Wat Ben Je Zonder Vrienden	2015	-	-	-	Toppers in concert 2015
Een heel gelukkig kerstfeest	2016	-	-	-	Toppers in concert - Christmas party of the year

=== DVDs ===
- Toppers In Concert 2005 - Gold / Platinum
- Toppers In Concert 2006 - Gold / Platinum
- Toppers In Concert 2007 - Gold / Platinum
- Toppers In Concert 2008 - Gold / Platinum
- Toppers In Concert 2009 - Gold / Platinum
- Toppers In Concert 2010 - Gold / Platinum
- Toppers In Concert 2011 - Gold / Platinum
- Toppers In Concert 2012 - Gold / Platinum
- Toppers In Concert 2013 - Gold / Platinum
- Toppers In Concert 2014 - Gold
- Toppers In Concert 2015 - Gold
- Toppers In Concert 2016 - Platinum

=== Filmography ===
- Froger, Joling & Gordon: Over de Toppers - Reality television
- Toppers in de Sneeuw - Reality television
- Kerst met De Toppers in Disneyland - TV Special
- Toppers: De weg naar de ArenA - Reality television
- Toppers: De weg naar de ArenA 2007 - Reality television
- Toppers op weg naar Moskou - Reality television
- Goede tijden, slechte tijden - Cameo appearance
- Nationaal Songfestival (2009)
- Eurovision Song Contest 2009
- Wie wordt de 5e Topper? - Talentshow
- Toppers Halftimeshow - Talentshow
- Toppers Meezingmarathon - Toppers Marathon Series
- 12,5 Jaar De Toppers - Reality television
- De Toppers: Wild West, Thuis Best - Reality television
- Topper Gezocht! - Talentshow

Awards and achievements
Preceded by Hind with "Your Heart Belongs to Me"	Netherlands in the Eurovision Song Contest; 2009	Succeeded by Sieneke with "Ik ben verliefd (Sha-la-lie)"
