= Christoff De Bolle =

Belgian Flemish schlager singer

Christoff (Christoff De Bolle)
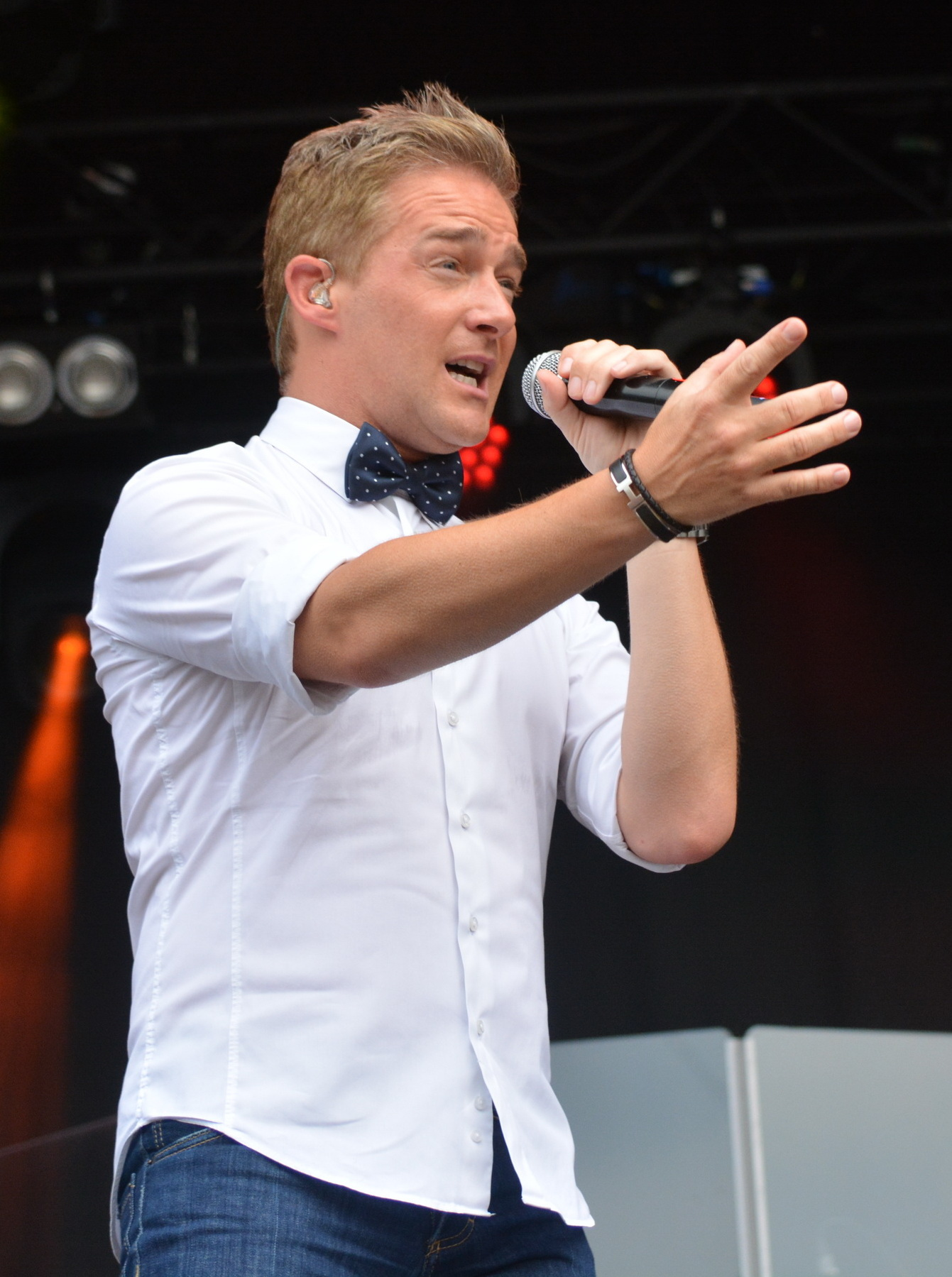
- Christoff (2009)

Background information
- Also known as: Christoffke
- Born: Christoff De Bolle; 18 June 1976 (age 50); Ninove, Belgium
- Genres: Belgian Pop and schlager music
- Occupation: Singer
- Years active: 1991–present
- Website: www.christoff.be

Christoff De Bolle (born in Ninove, Belgium on 18 June 1976), better known by the mononym Christoff is a Belgian Flemish schlager singer. He is also a radio presenter, and appeared in a number of television series. Since 2015, he has been part of the schlager boyband Klubbb3, together with Florian Silbereisen and Jan Smit.

== Awards ==
- 2010: Career Award for 20 years in music
- 2011, 2013, 2016: Music Industry Awards (MIA), Best Flemish language Artist
- 2012, 2013: Anne Vlaamse Muziek Award for Best Male Schlager Artist
- 2013, 2014: Radio 2 Zomerhit for "Best Male Artist"
- 2015: Radio 2 Zomerhit for "Best Ambiance"

== Discography ==
=== Albums ===
Year	Album	Peak positions	Certification
Year	Album	BEL (Fl)	Certification
1996	Intro	13	
1997	In volle vlucht	31	
1999	Millennium	24	
2007	Blauwe ogen	3	Gold
2008	Zeven zonden	2	Platinum
2009	Blaue augen	93	
2009	1001 nachten	1	Platinum
2010	Das geht klar	—	
2011	Christoff & vrienden	1	Platinum
2012	Christoff & vrienden – Live in concert	3	Platinum
2013	Christoff & vrienden 2	1	Gold
2013	Christoff & vrienden XL deluxe edition live CD+DVD	5	Gold
2014	Altijd onderweg	1	Platinum
2014	Back to Back (with Will Tura)	1	Platinum
2015	Kerstmis met jou	3	Gold
2016	Hou me vast	1	Gold
2018	Duetten	5	
2023	Dit ben ik	3	

Compilation albums

Year	Album	Peak positions	Certification
Year	Album	BEL (Fl)	Certification
2001	10 Jaar	—	
2009	Goud van hier	—	
2009	Luv mi long tim	—	
2010	Alle hits	1	Platinum
2017	De Hits	5	

=== Singles ===
Year	Singles	Peak positions
Year	Singles	BEL (Fl)
1993	"Liefde is meer dan een woord" (with Lindsay)	50
1995	"Ik beleef het allemaal opnieuw"	38
1996	"De levensgenieter"	36
1996	"Verdrinken in je ogen"	28
1996	"We nemen elkaar zoals we zijn" (with Lindsay)	13
1996	"Dat kleine stukje straat"	42
1997	"Koning clown"	6 (Ultratip)
1997	"Kopje onder"	31
1997	"Samen dromen"	14 (Ultratip)
1998	"Gevoelens"	16 (Ultratip)
1998	"Een optimist"	44
1998	"Dans le jardin de Sainte Cathérine"	8 (Ultratip)
1999	"M'n engelbewaarder"	10 (Ultratip)
1999	"Verslaafd aan jou"	9 (Ultratip)
1999	"Ik geef je wat ik geven kan" (with Lindsay)	11 (Ultratip)
2001	"Zoveel vrouw als jij"	16 (Ultratip)
2002	"Op naar de top"	13 (Ultratip)
2006	"Eenmaal komt voor jou die dag"	18
2007	"Ja jij!"	48
2007	"Als ik in je blauwe ogen kijk"	2
2008	"Een ster"	1
2008	"Zeven zonden"	2
2008	"Witte Kerstmis / White Christmas" (with Bing Crosby)	4
2009	"In 100.000 jaren"	5
2009	"Miljonair"	9
2009	"Zaterdagavond" (with Dennie, Mieke & Lindsay)	5
2010	"Je maakt me zo gek!"	5
2010	"'t Is weer tijd voor de polonaise"	7
2011	"Niemand laat zijn eigen kind alleen" (with Willeke Alberti)	5
2011	"Mijn nr. 1" (with The Sunsets)	18
2011	"Sweet Caroline"	30
2012	"1000 sterren hotel"	43
2012	"Omdat ie zo mooi is"	7 (Ultratip)
2013	"Sierra madre del sur" (live) (with Jo Vally)	55 (Ultratip)
2013	"Zeg maar niets meer" (with André Hazes jr.)	33
2013	"Alles kan een mens gelukkig maken" (with René Froger)	7 (Ultratip)
2013	"Kom in mijn armen" (with Lindsay)	44
2013	"Ik hoor bij jou/el ritmo de la passion" (with Belle Perez)	5 (Ultratip)
2014	"M'n beste vriend"	36
2014	"Voor jou"	4
2014	"Onze vader"	22
2015	"In de zevende hemel"	12 (Ultratip)
2015	"Ik ben toch geen bank" (live)	17
2015	"Vaarwel" (live)	6
2015	"Vergeven kan, vergeten niet"	35
2016	"Ogen weer geopend"	27 (Ultratip)
2016	"Een dag vol liefde"	20 (Ultratip)
2017	"Dronken van liefde"	34 (Ultratip)
2018	"Stapel op jou"	12 (Ultratip)
2021	"Als je bij me bent"	13 (Ultratip)

*Those indicated as Ultratip did not appear in the official Belgian Ultratop 50 charts, but rather in the bubbling under Ultratip charts.
