= BZN =

Dutch pop music group (1966–2007)

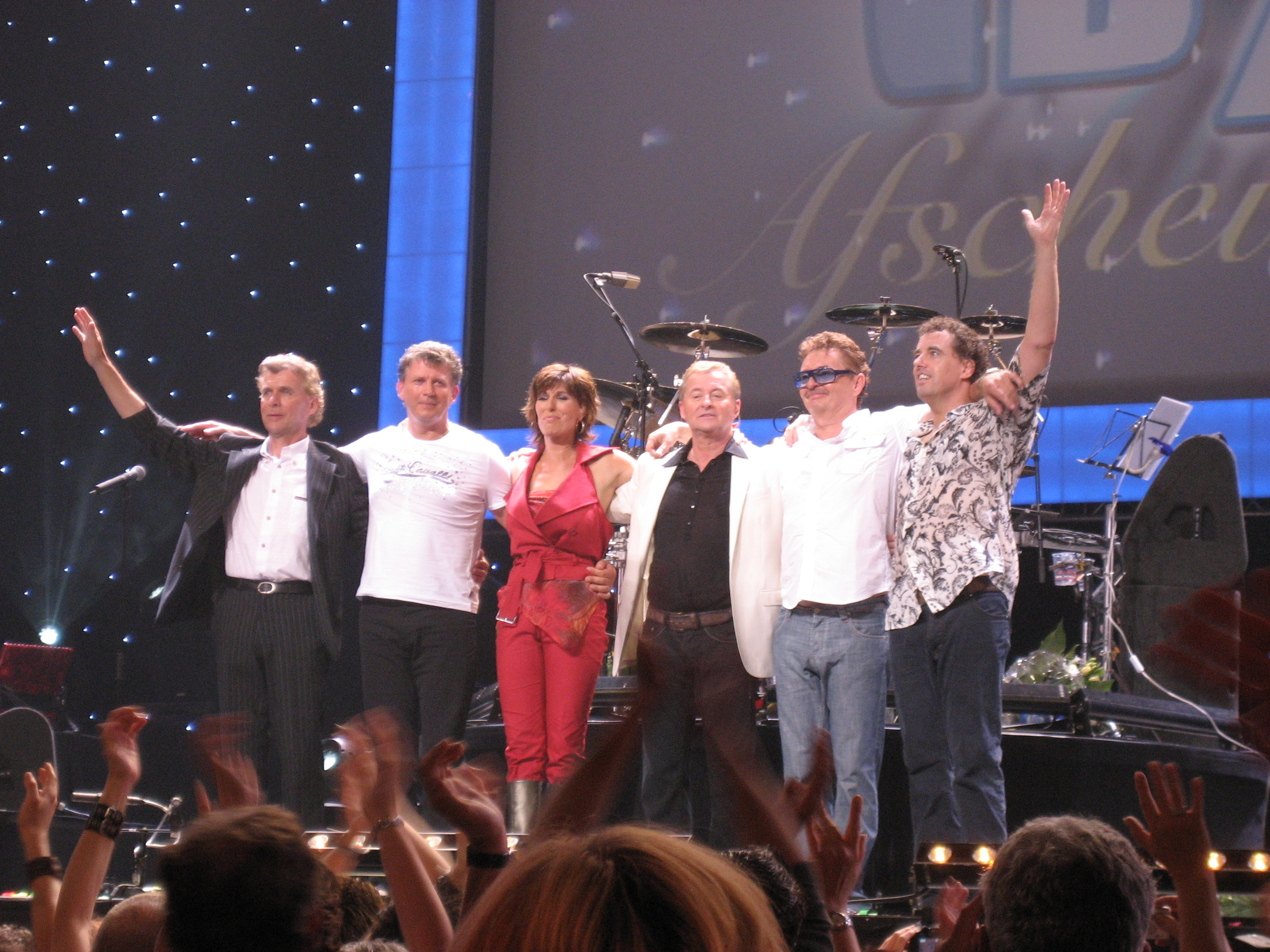
- BZN at the end of their final concert in Ahoy Rotterdam, 16 June 2007

Background information
- Origin: Volendam, Netherlands
- Genres: Pop, chanson, schlager, Pop rock, Palingsound
- Years active: 1966–2007
- Labels: Negram; Phonogram; Mercury; Universal
- Past members: Jan Keizer; Carola Smit; Jan Veerman; Jan Tuijp; John Meijer; Dick Plat; Anny Schilder
- Website: www.bzn-online.com

BZN discography
- Studio albums: 33
- Live albums: 2
- Compilation albums: 8
- Singles: 73
- Video albums: 21

BZN (Band Zonder Naam; Dutch for "Band Without Name") was a Dutch pop group that had a string of hits from 1966 to 2007 on. BZN recorded mostly in English and French, but also had success with material in Dutch and German.

== History ==
BZN started out as a pop-rock band in their native Volendam in 1966, playing early-Bee Gees-like harmony pop. The initial line-up consisted of Jan Veerman (vocals), Cees Tol (guitar), Evert Woestenburg (guitar) Jan Tuijp (bass guitar) and Gerrit Woestenburg (drums).

In the early 1970s, the band switched to hard rock and had its first successes, including a brace of Top 40 hits. After original lead singer Veerman left the band, and drummer Jan Keizer took his place, the band made a musical U-turn and opted for commercial middle-of-the-road pop, adding female co-vocalist Anny Schilder and laying the foundation for their status as the most popular Dutch band ever (in terms of hit singles and albums). BZN has had 55 hits in the Dutch hit charts to date, and are the only music act to have had top 40 hit singles for 26 consecutive years (1973-1998). Album chart presence was even stronger, without interruption from 1977 to 2008.

BZN's big breakthrough started with the song "Mon Amour" (1976), which held the #1 hit parade ranking for over 5 weeks. Outside of the Netherlands the band has had some success as well, amongst which several hits in South Africa (such as "Yeppa" in 1990), and minor successes with their French-language songs in Canada.

The most important line-up change was the departure of Schilder in 1984; she was replaced by Carola Smit. Then, in 1988, the brothers Cees (guitar) and Thomas Tol (keyboards) left; they had been responsible for most of the music and lyrics. The band still remained successful, making their last major change in strategy when they decided to write Dutch lyrics, in 2003.

BZN are also responsible for the initial success of singer Jan Smit, who was discovered by BZN at the age of 10 and went on to have pop and schlager successes in the Netherlands, Germany, and Belgium.

On 14 November 2005, four members of BZN were recognized with an Order of Orange-Nassau for their contributions to Dutch music history. They went on a farewell tour in 2006 and 2007.

== Amassing gold and platinum records ==
Their 1982 album Pictures of Moments went gold and sold over 80,000 units, the first local group in the history of Phonogram Holland to have done so.

== Final lineup until 16 June 2007 ==
- Carola Smit – vocals (joined on 25 March 1984)
- Jan Keizer – vocals (joined on 17 October 1969)
- John Meijer – guitar (joined on 23 January 2003)
- Dick Plat – keyboards (joined on 27 March 1988)
- Jan Tuijp – bass guitar (joined on 1 July 1966)
- Jack Veerman – drums (joined on 1 May 1974)

== Discography ==
=== Studio albums ===
- The Bastard (1971)
- Making a Name (1977)
- You're Welcome (1978)
- Summer Fantasy (1979)
- Grootste Hits (1980)
- Green Valleys (1980)
- Friends (1981)
- We Wish You a Merry Christmas (1981)
- Pictures of Moments (1982)
- The Best of BZN (1982)
- 28 Golden Hits (1983)
- Desire (1983)
- Falling in Love (1984)
- Reflections (1984)
- Maid of the Mist (1985)
- Christmas with BZN (1985)
- Heartbreaker (1986)
- BZN Live - 20 Jaar (1987)
- Visions (1987)
- Endless Dream (1988)
- Crystal Gazer (1989)
- Bells of Christmas (1989)
- Horizon (1990)
- Congratulations (1991)
- Rhythm of My Heart (1992)
- Gold (1993)
- Sweet Dreams (1993)
- Serenade (1994)
- Summer Holiday (1995)
- 'Round the Fire (1995)
- A Symphonic Night (1996)
- Pearls (1997)
- A Symphonic Night II (1998)
- The Best Days of My Life (1999)
- Gold & More (2000)
- More Gold (2000)
- Out in the Blue (2001)
- Tequila Sunset (2002)
- Leef je leven (2003)
- Die mooie tijd (2005)
- The Singles Collection (2005)
- Adieu BZN - The Final Concert (2007)
- BZN Top 100 (2008)

=== Singles ===
- Maybe Someday (1968)
- Waiting for You (1968) #24
- Everyday I Have to Cry (15 February 1969) #17
- Gonna Take My Mind Off Maria (1969)
- Mother Can You See Me (1969)
- This Is What I Feel (1970)
- Rock and Roll Woman (1971)
- Bad Bad Woman (1971) #16
- I Can't See (1972)
- Riding On (1972)
- Rolling Around the Band (10 March 1973) #20
- Sweet Silver Anny (6 October 1973)
- Barber's Rock (2 March 1974)
- Love Me Like a Lion (10 August 1974)
- Goodbye Sue (31 May 1975)
- Djadja (1976)
- Mon Amour (18 September 1976) #1
- Don't Say Goodbye (12 February 1977) #2
- Sevilla (9 September 1977) #4
- The Clown (3 December 1977) #5
- Lady McCorey (6 June 1978) #2
- Felicidad (2 December 1978) #7
- Oh Me Oh My (28 April 1979) #12
- Marching On (8 September 1979) #8
- Pearly Dumm (16 February 1980) #1
- Rockin' the Trolls (23 August 1980) #4
- Chanson d'Amour (11 April 1981) #3
- The Old Calahan (15 August 1981) #4
- Blue Eyes (15 May 1982) #5
- Twilight (11 September 1982) #5
- Put on Your Make-Up (1982)
- Just an Illusion (12 March 1983) #3
- Le Legionnaire (17 September 1983) #6
- If I Say the Words (7 April 1984) #4
- La Saison Francaise (22 September 1984)
- The Summertime (27 April 1985) #6
- Run Away Home (21 September 1985) #15
- Waltzing Maria (19 April 1986) #27
- La France (30 August 1986)
- Amore (26 September 1987) #6
- La Difference (30 April 1988)
- La Primavere (10 September 1988)
- Wheels on Fire (19 November 1988) #23
- El Cordobes (20 May 1989)
- If I Had Only a Chance (9 September 1989)
- Help Me (5 May 1990)
- Yeppa (1 September 1990)
- Over the Hills (10 November 1990)
- It Happened 25 Years ago (31 August 1991)
- Che Sara (1992)
- My Number One (1993)
- Desanya (1993)
- Quiereme Mucho (1994) #36
- Banjo Man (1994) #06
- Santo Domingo (1995)
- Sing of Love and Faith (1996)
- Mama (1996)
- "La Spagnola" (1997) #31
- Wedding bells (1997)
- Mother (1997)
- The Gypsy Music (1998) #29
- Mexican Night (1998)
- Don't Give Up, Don't Give In (1998)
- Baby Voulez-Vous? (1999)
- Isles of Atlantis (1999)
- Keep Smiling (2001)
- Where the Nightingales Sing (2001)
- Will There Be a Time? (2002)
- De zon, de zee (2003)
- The Hitmedley (2005) Tipparade
- Goodbye (2007)
- Thanks (2025)
