= Anny Schilder =

Dutch singer (born 1959)

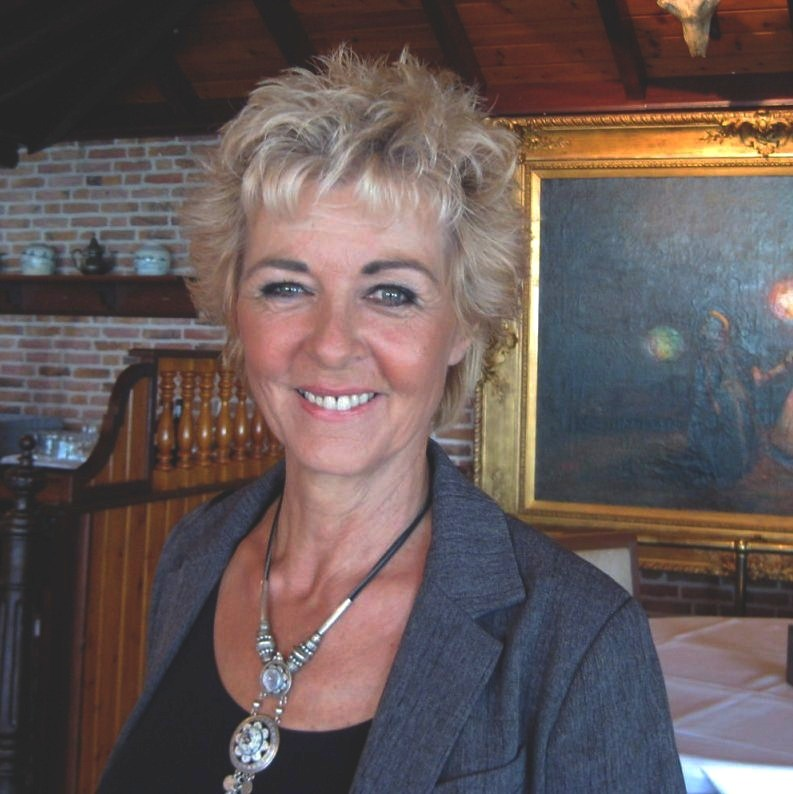
- Schilder in 2011

Background information
- Born: Anny Schilder; 1959 (age 66–67)
- Occupation: Singer

Anny Schilder (b. 14 February 1959) is a Dutch pop singer, and was the lead singer of BZN from 1976 to 1984.

== Biography ==
=== BZN-Singer ===
Jack Veerman, the drummer of BZN met Schilder when she was working as a salesgirl at an eel-stand in Volendam, and when his band was looking for a female singer, he remembered she had a great voice. They had her audition, but she initially was too timid to become a performer. It took some time, but Veerman was able to convince her. She became, together with Jan Keizer the face of BZN from 1976 until 1984. The first single the band released with the two lead-singers was Mon Amour, which was an immediate success. A long string of top-10 hits followed.

In 1984 Schilder decided to leave BZN, citing that she needed more time to spend with her family. Later on she admitted that the continuous touring and performing was getting too much for her. She had her sister babysit her daughter, who started calling her Mama instead of Schilder. Carola Smit replaced her as lead-singer of BZN.

=== Solo ===
After leaving BZN, Schilder had a reasonably successful solo career, although never as successful as with BZN. She released her first solo single in December 1984 for the holidays called Eeuwige Kerst (Eternal Christmas). The song was written by Henk Temming of Het Goede Doel, and accompanied by the children's choir of Kinderen voor Kinderen, as well as the Amsterdam Choir De Stem Des Volks.

She did release several other hits, like Love is...(1985), Adieu Cherie (1988) and You are my Hero (1989), which entered the charts in the top 10. Her most successful album was You are my Hero, which just fell short of obtaining a gold-record.

=== Ending Her Solo-Career ===
After 1997 Schilder stopped recording new music. She met a Spanish Discotheque Owner, and in 2004 she left Volendam to move to Spain with her children. She did not return to The Netherlands until 2006, after which she re-energized her singing career.

=== BNZ'66-Singer ===
The only singing engagements Schilder did between 2000 and 2006 was with a BZN-reunion band, made up of former BZN members, called BZN'66. This band played mostly songs from the early years of BZN, during which period beat and rock music were their genre.

=== Book ===
On 21 March 2007 Schilder released her autobiography Anny en Ik (Anny and I). In this book she describes her divorce in 1986 and her postpartum depression. The book sold 10,000 copies in the first three months after its release. At the same time she released a new album with the same title. The CD contains covers of BZN songs, as well as covers of other artist's hits, like The Way Old Friends Do from ABBA. This song is a duet with Schilder's daughter Anja. The song Rockin' the Trolls, a BZN-cover, was released as a single, which includes vocals by former-BZN member Jan Veerman.

=== Number 1 hit in South Africa ===
In 2007 Schilder released a song titled First Kiss Goodnight, a duet with South-African singer Gerrie Pretorius. The song reached the number 1 spot in the charts in South Africa, and received platinum status. The song was released in September 2007 in The Netherlands, but did not chart.

=== Anny & José ===
In May 2009 Schilder released a new single titled Be My Baby, which was a duet with Luv' singer José Hoebee. The song was somewhat successful in Belgium, and Schilder and Hoebee continued to appear together on occasion.

=== Jan & Anny ===
25 years after leaving BZN, Schilder performed for the first time with co-singer Jan Keizer. They sang Mon Amour at the 80th birthday celebration of famous TV host Mies Bouwman. This was broadcast by the AVRO TV station on 30 December 2009.

The reaction to their performance was so positive, they decided to continue working together. Their management revealed they would record an album and a single, as well as a TV music special. On 2 July 2010 they released the single Take me to Ibiza as Jan en Anny. The song reached number 3 in the charts, making it the most successful song released by BZN-related artists in 10 years. The album Together Again was released on 10 September 2010, and Mies Bouwman presented the duo with the first copy during her show. During the same show, a few minutes later, they received a Golden Record. The second song released as a single was C'est La Vie, which reached the top 5 of the Single Top 100. The third song released as a single was Amor Amor Amor. On 28 October 2012 they performed at the Sala Palatului in Bucharest for 7,000 fans, as a start to their theater tour through The Netherlands. On 24 September 2018 they announced they would stop performing as a duo, and in the end of 2019 a farewell concert was broadcast on TV.

== Discography ==
=== Albums ===
Album title	Release date	Charting in the Dutch Album Top 100			Comments
Album title	Release date	Date of entry	Highest	Weeks	Comments
Here I am	1985	20-04-1985	21	9	
Anny Schilder	11-1988	03-12-1988	30	14	
You are my hero	11-1989	09-12-1989	34	11	
All of me	12-1990	-			
The best of Anny Schilder	1991	-			Greatest Hits
This is Anny Schilder	12-1991	04-01-1992	65	5	
Spiegel	10-1993	06-11-1993	63	6	
High noon	03-1995	01-04-1995	38	12	
Sentimientos	07-1997	-			
Anny en ik	03-2007	21-03-2007	90	2	
Together again	10-09-2010	18-09-2010	5	17	with Jan Keizer / Gold
The Two of us	14-02-2013	23-02-2013	11	1*	with Jan Keizer
Unforgettable Duets	10-10-2014				with Jan Keizer
Greatest hits	10-11-2017				with Jan Keizer (CD & DVD)
Grande Finale	18-10-2019				with Jan Keizer (CD & DVD)

=== Singles ===
Single title	Release date	Charting in the Dutch Top 40			Comments
Single title	Release date	Date of entry	Highest	Weeks	Comments
Eeuwige kerst	1984	15-12-1984	12	5	with Het Goede Doel, Kinderen voor Kinderen en De Stem des Volks / #5 in the Single Top 100
Love is...	1985	23-02-1985	28	4	#20 in the Single Top 100
Hold on	1985	-			
Mama's dinky darling	1985	31-08-1985	tip10	-	#48 in the Single Top 100
Mandola mandoline	1986	22-03-1986	tip16	-	
Think about love	1986	-			
Valley of pain	1987	-			
Darling	1987	-			
Adieu cherie	1988	05-11-1988	19	5	#15 in the Single Top 100
Happy Xmas (War is over) / Gelukkig kerstfeest	1988	10-12-1988	35	3	Artiesten voor het Ronald McDonaldhuis / #15 in the Single Top 100
Goodbye farewell	1989	14-01-1989	tip11	-	#46 in the Single Top 100
La bambola	1989	-			
You are my hero	1989	28-10-1989	9	7	#7 in the Single Top 100 / Alarmschijf
Le soleil	1990	13-01-1990	tip12	-	#47 in the Single Top 100
Sailorboy	1990	-			
De eerste keer	1990	08-09-1990	tip8	-	with Dave / #40 in de Single Top 100
Where would I be without you	1990	-			
I take it back	1990	-			
Samen leven	12-1990	-			Artiesten voor Droezbal / #62 in the Single Top 100
Love is all I wanna give	1991	21-12-1991	tip11	-	#42 in the Single Top 100
Gladly belong to you	1991	-			
Working girl	1992	25-04-1992	tip3	-	#42 in the Single Top 100
If you go	1992	-			
When you walk in the room	1993	24-07-1993	tip4	-	with Piet Veerman / #32 in the Single Top 100
Er is één ding dat altijd blijft	1993	09-10-1993	tip8	-	#38 in the Single Top 100
Moeder	1993	-			
Meisje van 16	1993	-			
High noon	1995	-			
Sweet Suzanne	1995	-			
Mon amour	05-1995	-			with Demis Roussos
Yo te quiero mi amor	1996	-			
A perfect day	11-1996	-			with Roger Whittaker
Junto a mi	1997	-			
Yours/Quiereme Mucho	1997	-			
Por Un Amor	1997	-			
Toen kwam jij	14-10-2006	-			with John de Bever / #80 in the Single Top 100
Rockin' the trolls	04-2007	-			with Jan Veerman
The first kiss goodnight	09-2007	-			with Gerrie Pretorius
Be my baby	18-05-2009	-			with José Hoebee as Anny & José / #92 in the Single Top 100
Take me to Ibiza...	02-07-2010	-			with Jan Keizer / #3 in the Single Top 100
C'est la vie	27-11-2010	-			with Jan Keizer
Amor amor	06-05-2011	*	*	*	with Jan Keizer
Afraid to fall in love again	11-01-2013	*	*	*	with Jan Keizer
Felicita	12-09-2014				with Jan Keizer
I love the summertime	26-06-2015				with Jan Keizer
Mon amour je t'aime	12-11-2016				with Jan Keizer
Don't try to change me	17-06-2017				with Jan Keizer
Chanson d'amour	10-11-2017	-			with Jan Keizer
The time of my life	2019	-			with Jan Keizer
