= Sterren 24 =

Sterren 24 (formerly Sterren.nl) was Nederland 24's Dutch music channel. Programmed by TROS, it broadcast programmes from TROS's archives, as well as original content. It closed in 2012.

== History ==
The channel started in October 2006, when Publieke Omroep expanded Nederland 4's offer to seventeen channels. On 15 February 2008, Sterren.nl started its weekly chart show, Sterren Top 25. The criteria was based entirely on users of the channel's website.

With the rename of Nederland 4 to Nederland 24, the channel was renamed accordingly. With the rename, its viewership increased in 33%. TROS launched a tie-in web radio station on 2 April 2010.

On 12 August 2012, Sterren 24's closure was announced by NPO, effective 31 August. The channel's content continued under the Sterren.nl website operated by TROS.
