= Stefan Christoff =

Canadian journalist, musician and activist

Stefan Christoff is a Canadian journalist of Macedonian origin, community organizer and musician based in Montreal, Quebec.

== Arts ==
As a social activist and artist Christoff has been involved in numerous efforts to build links between grassroots activism and the creative arts. Between 2000 and 2002 Christoff coordinated the Howl! Festival of Art and Revolution. After launching in Montreal in 2000 the festival titled after the Allen Ginsberg poem Howl also took place in Toronto, Halifax and New York City in 2002.

Christoff is also involved in the Artists Against Apartheid concert series in Montreal, a cultural event series that featuring celebrated artists from across the musical spectrum performing in solidarity with Palestine. Past performers include Lhasa De Sela, the Palestinian hip-hop ensemble DAM and the celebrated Montreal hip-hop ensemble Nomadic Massive.

== Activism ==
As an activist Christoff has been deeply involved in numerous grassroots organizing initiatives in Montreal. Specifically Christoff has been involved in various migrant justice campaigns in Montreal, organizing with communities, families and individuals struggling against deportation from Canada and for full citizenship rights for non-status people.

Also Christoff has been active with the International Solidarity Movement (ISM), a Palestinian-led movement of activists working to oppose the daily workings of the Israeli occupation in Palestinian lands. In 2003 Christoff traveled to Palestine to work with Palestinian civil society groups and the ISM but was detained and deported to Jordan.

== Photography ==
As a visual artist and photographer Christoff has exhibited throughout Canada, including a first exhibition as a visual artist at Casa del Popolo in Montreal in April 2001.

In 2007 Christoff's photo exhibition Lebanon: Open Skies of Struggle on Lebanon featuring photographs from numerous trips to the Middle East, exhibited in Montreal, Winnipeg at the Rudolf Rocker Cultural Centre and Saskatoon.

After traveling to the Philippines in 2007, to participate in a grassroots election observation mission in Manila for the mid-term elections, Christoff produced a second photo exhibition documenting urban landscapes and social movements in the Philippines. Christoff's photographs on the Philippines opened in Montreal in the fall of 2009, showing at local cafes and Université du Québec à Montréal (UQAM). Christoff's exhibition on movements in Manila features artistic photography from the Philippines and was sponsored by Montreal-based Filipino community organizations, such as the Centre for Philippine Concerns contributing to local efforts in Montreal to raise awareness on the political killings in the Philippines in recent years. In February 2010 Christoff exhibited the photos to positive reviews and opened the exhibition with a reading from Filipino author Miguel Syjuco.

== Discography ==
Studio albums

- Temps Libre (2013)
- Pодина (2013) (with Sam Shalabi)
