= René Froger =

Dutch singer

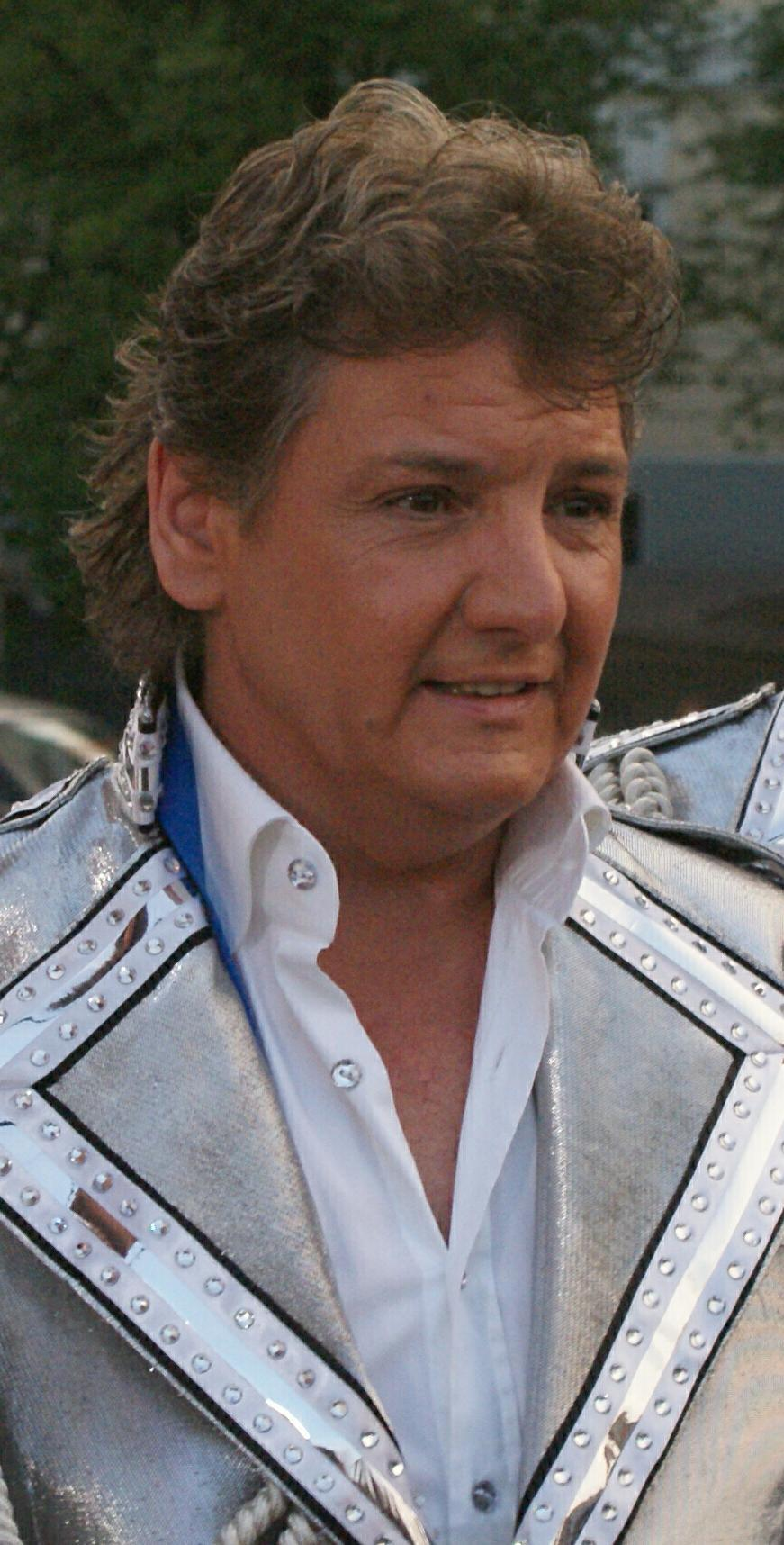
- René Froger in 2009

Background information
- Also known as: Froog
- Born: 5 November 1960 (age 65)
- Origin: Amsterdam, Netherlands
- Genres: Pop, AOR, Europop, Dutch Pop
- Occupation: Singer
- Instrument: Vocals
- Years active: 1984–present
- Label: CNR Records Dino Music EMI Music NRGY Music
- Website: www.renefroger.nl

René Froger (born 5 November 1960 in Amsterdam), is a Dutch singer.

Froger was born, and spent his first years in the Jordaan, a neighbourhood in Amsterdam. His father, Bolle Jan, had a café where Froger started performing. He started his career working with Ted de Braak and Mini en Maxi and in 1987 he released his first single, Love Leave Me.

Major success eluded him until his song Winter in America entered the Dutch Top 40 in 1988 (10 years after Australian folk Musician Doug Ashdown's original had done so). Later that year, he teamed up with the popular Dutch band Het Goede Doel to top the Dutch charts (#1 for three weeks in 1989) with Alles kan een mens gelukkig maken (Everything can make a man happy). A song for which in particular the refrain starting with Een eigen huis, een plek onder de zon (your own home, a place under the sun) morphed into a community sing-a-long evergreen.

Since 1989 he has released more singles, with mixed results.

He started the tour "Pure & More" in Amsterdam Arena, the stadium occupied by his favourite football team Ajax.

In 1997 he recorded a song with female singer Anita Doth who was part of the world-famous group 2 Unlimited. The song's title was "That's when I stop loving you"

In 2005, he was diagnosed with prostate cancer, which resulted in several complications. In the same year, he stated collaborating with Gerard Joling and Gordon in the opportunity formation De Toppers. Rene represented the Netherlands at the Eurovision Song Contest 2009 in Moscow as part of De Toppers.

His daughter Natascha was married in 2006, and gave birth to his first grandchild later that year.

== Discography ==
=== Albums ===
On CNR Music:

- Who dares wins, 1988 (gold & platinum, 100,000 units sold)
- Who dares wins, 1988 (limited edition picture disc CD)
- Who dares wins, 1989 (limited edition with free cd-single "Alles kan een mens......)
- You're my everything, 1989 (gold, 50.000 units sold)
- Are you ready for loving me, 1994 (gold & platinum 100.000 units sold)

On Dino Music:

- Midnight man, 1990 (gold & platinum 100.000 units sold)
- Matters of the heart, 1991 (gold & platinum 100.000 units sold)
- Sweet hello's and sad goodbyes, 1992 (gold & five times platinum, 500,000 units sold)(Gold Belgium sales for 25,000 units)
- The power of passion, 1993 (gold & two times platinum, 200,000 units sold)
- Walls of emotion, 1994 (gold & two times platinum, 200,000 units sold)
- The ballads, 1995
- Live in concert, 1995 (gold & platinum, 100, 000 units sold)
- Illegal Romeo part 1, 1996 (gold & platinum, 100, 000 units sold)
- Illegal Romeo part 1, 1996 (New version with "In Dreams" as bonus track
- Home again, 1998 (gold on pre-release sale & platinum, 100,000 units sold)
- I don't break easy, 1999 (gold & platinum, 80,000 units sold)
- All the hits, 2001 (gold, 30,000 units sold)
- All the hits, 2001 (limited edition with free cd containing live tracks)
- The passion tracks, 2000
- Internal affairs, 2002
- Internal affairs, 2002 (re-release with bonustrack "She")
- Sweet hello's and sad goodbyes II (incl. DVD) , 2003

On EMI:

- Pure, 2004 (only on hybrid Super audio CD)
- The platinum edition|, 2004 (gold)
- Live at the Arena, 2005
- Pure, 2005 (regular cd version)
- Pure Christmas, 2005 (super de boer supermarkets only)(gold & platinum, 80,000 units sold)
- Christmas with the toppers, 2006 (Free at C1000 supermarkets with €30 worth of groceries)
- Doe maar gewoon, (gold & platinum, 80,000 units sold) 2007
- Doe maar gewoon 2008 (limited edition with Eurocup bonus track)
- Happy Christmas, 2009 (re-release of Pure Christmas for the regular music market)
- "k heb je lief (2 cd), 2010 (Greatest hits collection to celebrate Rene's 50th birthday (gold & 25,000 units sold)
- FROGER, 2011 (gold & 25,000 units sold)

With The Toppers:

- Toppers in concert, 2005 (gold and platinum)
- Toppers in concert 2006, 2006 (gold)
- Toppers in concert 2007, 2007 (gold)
- Toppers in concert 2008, 2008 (gold)
- Toppers in concert 2009, 2009 (gold)
- Toppers in concert 2010, 2010 (gold)
- Toppers in concert 2011, 2011 (gold)
- Toppers in concert 2012, 2012 (gold)

On NRGY Music:

- "Liefde voor muziek", 2013
- "Dit is hoe het voelt", 2016

=== Singles ===
- Disco a la carte/Voor jou, 1979 (Lion Sound)
- My Hitparade/Homesick, 1984 (on the mercury label)
- My Hitparade/Mijn Hitparade (Dutch), 11 July 1987 (re-release on big life records)

On CNR Music:

- Ik zie het wel zitten/Let;s think about living, 11 July 1987
- Love leave me, 11 July 1987
- Winter in America, 12 March 1988
- Who dares wins, 25 June 1988
- See you on Sunday, 24 September 1988 (first single also to be released as cd-single)
- You're a lady,24-12-1988
- Alles kan een mens gelukkig maken, 11 March 1989 (gold & 3 times platinum, 300,000 units sold) Number 1 hit Dutch Top 40.
- Back on my feet again, 2 December 1989
- You're my everything, 1989
- Are you ready for loving me, 9 June 1990

On Empire:

- Just say hello, 6 October 1990
- Nobody else, 23 March 1990
- The love of the year, 1990

On Dino Music:

- You're a lady, 1988 (German debut single)
- Still on your side, 30 November 1991
- Woman, woman,7-3-1992
- Man with a mission,9-5-1992
- Kaylee, 18 July 1992
- Your place or mine,3-10-1992
- This is the moment, 19 December 1992
- Calling out your name (Ruby), 9 October 1993
- Why are you so beautiful, 25 December 1993
- Hollywood Nights, 1993 (also released in Germany)
- Here in my heart, 12 November 1994
- For a date with you,7-1-1995
- Why goodbye, 11 March 1995
- You've got a friend (feat Ruth Jacott and Marco Borsato), 9 September 1995 (gold, 50,000 units sold)
- Wild rhythm, 4 May 1996
- If you don't know, 10 August 1996
- In dreams, 26 October 1996
- That's when I'll stop loving you with singer Anita Doth, 1 March 1997
- The number one, 24 May 1997
- I'm coming home again, 1997 (recalled)
- Never fall in love, 27 December 1997
- Lovin' you, 28 November 1998
- Crazy way about you, 1 May 1999
- I can't stop myself, 28 August 1999
- Somebody's else's dream, 2000
- (Strip yourself) Naked for me, 2000
- "How do i win your heart", 2000 (for Dutch TV version of Who wants to marry a millionaire)
- Why you follow me, 11 August 2001
- Love me good, 2001
- The world i threw away 2002
- The world i threw away (Ahoy edition) 2002 (only available at the Ahoy concerts)
- She (A song for Maxima), 2 February 2002

On EMI:

- Live at the Arena medley, 2004
- Over de top, 2005
- Toppers party!, 2005
- Wir sind die Holländer (Toppers), 2006
- Kon het elke dag maar Kerstmis zijn (Rene Froger as guest performer), 2006
- Can you feel it, 2007
- Doe maar gewoon 2007
- Jij moet verder 2008
- Bloed, zweet en tranen 2008
- De zon schijnt voor iedereen 2008
- Sledgehammer (John Marks project feat:Rene Froger) 2009
- Zo Heppie 2009
- Zo Heppie (Christmas edition) 2009
- "k Heb je lief 2010 (only as download)
- "Ogen weer geopend 2011 (only as download)
- "Het verleden kruist het heden 2012 (only as download)
- "Samen 2012 (only as download)
- "Elke Zomer 2012 (only as download)

=== Budget Albums ===
- The very best of Rene Froger, 1993 (Diamond star collection)(Arcade)
- Are you ready for loving me, 1994 (CNR Music)(gold and platinum)
- René Froger, 1994 (Only for Kruidvat drugstores on Roman disc)
- René Froger First classic vol 1, 1994 (re-release of debut album)(CNR)
- René Froger First classic vol 2, 1994 (re-reales of 2nd album)(CNR)
- The Ballads, 1995 (CNR)
- The Ballads, 1996 (re issue with other sleeve) (CNR)
- She's a lady, 1997 (Only for Kruidvat drugstores) (CNR)
- Winter in America, 1998 (CNR)
- A mothers love, 1999 (special mother's day edition for Blokker department stores) (CNR)
- Hollands Glorie (Dutch Glory)|, 2001 (CNR)
- Hollands Goud (Dutch Gold)|, 2004 (CNR)
- Zijn mooiste nummer (His most beautiful songs)|, 2006 (CNR)
- Hollands Goud|, 2008 (repacked) (CNR)
- Hollands Gouds|, 2010 (new release in a budget series) (CNR)

=== Released Outside the Netherlands ===
- You're a lady, 1988 (Germany)(on Dino Music)
- Are you ready for loving me, 1990 (Germany) (ZYX)(on cd-single and 12" vinyl)
- Are you ready for loving me, 1990 (USA) (ZYX) (Only on 12" vinyl)
- Are you ready for loving me, 1990 (Philippines) (Only as 7" vinyl)
- Are you ready for loving me, 1991 (Japan) (Alabianca) (Only as 3" cd-single)
- Nobody Else 1993 dance mix, 1993 (Belgium only) (Dino Music)(cd-single and 7" vinyl)
- Woman, Woman, 1996 (Germany) (Hansa) cd-single
- Can u feel it, 1996 (Germany only) cd-single
- If i don't have you, 1993 (Belgium only) (Dino Music)(promoting concert in Antwerp)
- Crazy way about you, 1999(USA)(Rampage) cd-single and 12" vinyl)
- The best of my love, 2000 (Belgium only) (Dino Music)
- We all need a miracle, 2000 (Belgium only) (Dino Music)
- Home again (album), 2000 (South Korea) (BMG)
- Essential Rene Froger, 2001 (Belgium only) (Dino Music)

=== Video/DVD ===
- The video, 1994 (Gold & Platinum video award)
- The video, 1994 (VCD version on PHILIPS/CD-I)(Gold cd–i award for 10.000 sold copies)
- The show of the year, 2001 (DVD part from 2 cd set)
- A lifetime in music, 2002
- Pure Live, 2000
- The Platinum edition, 2004 (DVD part from 2 cd set)(Gold)
- Live at the Arena, 2005
- Toppers in concert, 2005 (Gold & Platinum)
- Toppers in concert, 2006 (Gold & Platinum)
- Toppers in concert, 2007 (Gold & Platinum)
- Toppers in concert, 2007 (Gold & Platinum)
- Toppers in concert, 2009 (Gold & Platinum)
- Toppers in concert, 2010 (Gold & Platinum)
- Toppers in concert, 2011 (Gold & Platinum)
- Heb je lief, 2010 (special edition 2 cd and 2 DVD in collectors box)

=== Guest appearances ===
- 1989 *Iedereen is anders, Artist: Het Goede Doel Song:Alles kan een mens gelukkig maken.
- 1991 *Lady & the tramp (DUTCH), Artist: Disney soundtracks Song: New York City.
- 1993 *Movie Songs, Artist: Chess Song: Beauty and the beast.
- 1994 *Nice to meet ya, Artist: Sandy Kandau Song: Make it real.
- 1997 *Friends for life, Artist: Montserat Caballe Song: Out of the blue.
- 2008 *The Winding road, Artist: Engelbert Humperdinck Song: Whiter shade of pale.

== Filmography ==
- De Grote Sinterklaasfilm en de Strijd om Pakjesavond (2023)
