= Gerard Joling =

Dutch singer and television presenter

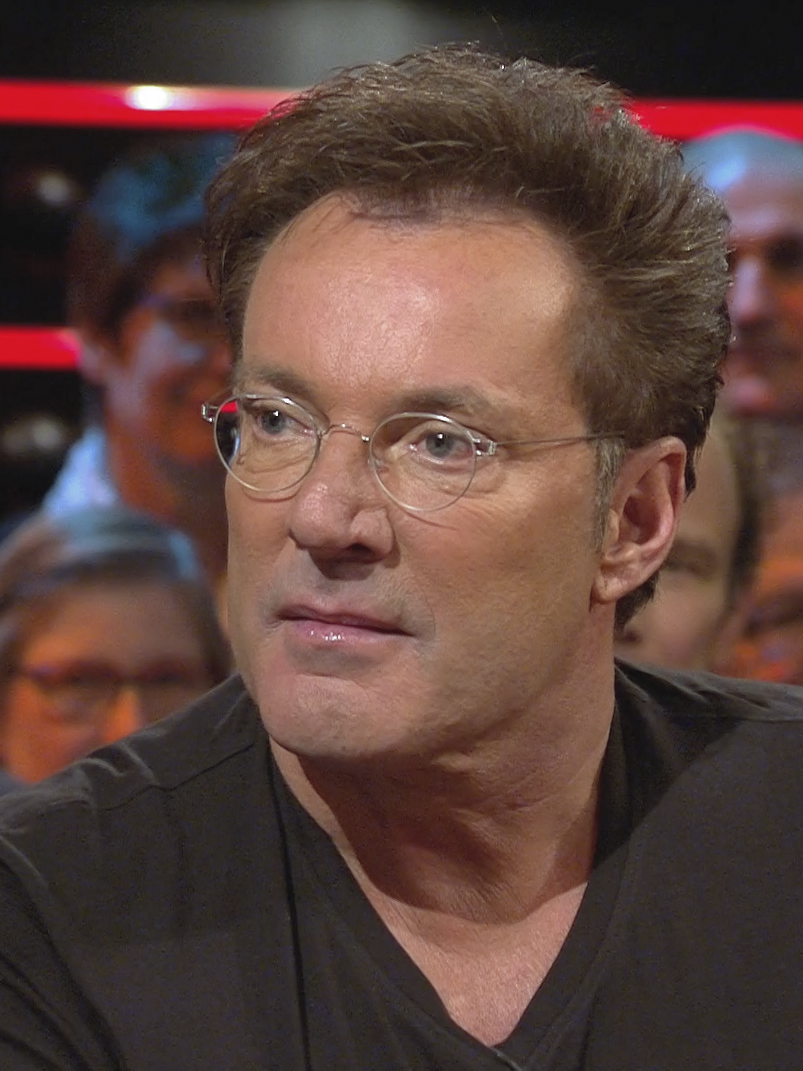
- Joling in 2018

Background information
- Also known as: Geer
- Born: Gerard Jan Joling; 29 April 1960 (age 66)
- Origin: Schagen, Netherlands
- Genres: Pop
- Occupations: Singer, television presenter
- Instrument: Vocals
- Years active: 1985–present
- Label: NRGY Music

Gerard Jan (Geer) Joling (born 29 April 1960) is a Dutch singer and television presenter. Known for his high tenor voice, he rose to fame in the late 1980s and released a string of singles including "Ticket to the Tropics" and "Love Is in Your Eyes". He also achieved success in Asia and received more than 20 gold and platinum records.

In 1988, he was the Dutch participant in the Eurovision Song Contest 1988, with the song "Shangri-La".

His biggest hit was "No More Boleros" (1989) that reached the top 10 in several countries in mainland Europe. The song was recorded by different artists such as Clemente (Portugal), Sula Mazurenga and As Marcianas (both in Brazil), Karel Gott (in German and Czech), Demis Roussos, Semino Rossi, Oliver Thomas and George Meiring (in 2011 in South Africa). In May 1990, Joling performed at the World Music Awards in Monaco, where he received an award for World's Best-Selling Dutch Artist.

Joling & Gordon Over de Vloer is a television program Gerard Joling made with singer Gordon in 2005. There were 3 seasons of the series which featured the duo during work and having a laugh.

In 2007, he was the host of Sterren dansen op het ijs and So You Wanna Be a Popstar for the television channel SBS6. 2007 was also the year that sparked Joling's renewed success, with two number 1 songs, a number 1 album, and 11 gold and platinum awards.

In 2008, Joling became team captain on the Dutch TV show Wie ben ik? ("Who am I?"), in which the team captains, together with both two guests, have to guess who they are, based on hints and questions they can ask. The other team captain was Patty Brard.

Joling was scheduled to represent The Netherlands at the Eurovision Song Contest 2009 in Moscow as a member of De Toppers, but temporarily left the group after a conflict with Gordon. Joling was replaced in The Toppers with Jeroen van der Boom. In December 2009, De Toppers manager Benno de Leeuw announced in Dutch newspaper De Telegraaf that Gerard Joling and Gordon were to rejoin the group, turning the trio into a foursome once more.

Joling can also regularly be seen as a member of juries on a myriad of Dutch television programs. In 2018, he was seen in The Voice Senior and since 2019 in the Dutch version of the program The Masked Singer.

In April 2026 Joling was the main aggressor in a physical fight on his own stage. During his show in Boerhaar a teenager in the crowd threw a beer cup at the performer after which Joling confronted the boy by inviting him on stage which eventually resulted in physical assault at the hands of Joling.

== Discography ==
=== Albums ===
==== Solo ====
Year	Title	Peak		
Year	Title	NL	BEL (FL)	GER
1985	Love Is in Your Eyes	1	—	—
1986	Sea Of Love	5	—	—
1987	Heart To Heart	32	—	—
1989	No More Boleros	1	—	—
1990	Carazon	28	—	—
1991	Memory Lane	22	—	—
1992	Eye To Eye	34	—	—
1994	Eternal Love	33	—	—
1995	Heel Even Anders	33	—	—
1997	Nightlife	76	—	—
2004	Nostalgia	71	—	—
2007	Maak Me Gek	1	21	—
2008	Bloedheet	5	—	—
2011	Gewoon Gerard	4	—	—
2013	Ik Ook Van Jou	1	161	—
2014	Christmas, The Birth of Love	11	—	—
2016	Lieveling	5	117	—
2023	Dit ben ik	21	73	—

==== Solo: Compilation ====
Year	Title	Peak		
Year	Title	NL	BEL (FL)	GER
1995	The Collection: 1985–1995	38	—	—
2010	Goud: 25 Jaar Gerard Joling	2	—	—

==== Collaboration ====
Year	Title	Peak		
Year	Title	NL	BEL (FL)	GER
1989	Kinderen Zingen Voor Dieren (ft. Julian Hartman)	57	—	—
2005	Toppers in Concert (Gerard, Rene & Gordon)	3	—	—
2006	Toppers in Concert 2006 (Gerard, Rene & Gordon)	2	—	—
2007	Toppers in Concert 2007 (Gerard, Rene & Gordon)	1	—	—
2008	Toppers in Concert 2008 (Gerard, Rene & Gordon)	2	—	—
2010	Toppers in Concert 2010 (Gerard, Rene, Gordon & Jeroen)	2	—	—
2011	Toppers in Concert 2011 (Gordon, Rene, Gerard & Jeroen)	1	51	—
2012	Toppers in Concert 2012 (Rene, Gerard & Jeroen)	2	31	—
2013	Toppers in Concert 2013 (Rene, Gerard & Jeroen)	19	34	—
2014	Toppers in Concert 2014 (Rene, Gerard & Jeroen)	2	38	—
2015	Toppers in Concert 2015: Crazy Summer (Rene, Gerard & Jeroen)	1	14	—
2016	Toppers in Concert 2016: Royal Night Of Disco (Rene, Gerard & Jeroen)	3	11	—
2017	Toppers in Concert 2017: Wild West, Thuis Best (Rene, Gerard & Jeroen)	10	14	—
2018	Toppers in Concert 2018: Pretty in Pink (The Circus Edition) (Rene, Gerard, Jeroen & Jan)	10	6	—

==== Collaboration: Compilation ====
Year	Title	Peak		
Year	Title	NL	BEL (FL)	GER
2011	Toppers in Concert 2005–2010: Mega Party Mix, Volume 1 (Greatest Hits in the Mix) (Gordon, Rene, Gerard & Jeroen)	7	—	—
2011	Toppers in Concert 2005–2010: Mega Party Mix, Volume 1 (Greatest Hits in the Mix) (Gordon, Rene, Gerard & Jeroen)	19	—	—

=== Singles ===
List of singles, with selected Top 1000 chart positions
Title	Year	Peak chart positions			
Title	Year	NL 40	NL 100	BEL (FL)	GER
"Love Is in Your Eyes"	1985	4	2	2	—
"Ticket to the Tropics"	1985	1	1	3	—
"Reach"	1986	8	10	8	—
"Spanish Heart"	1986	28	22	—	—
"Midnight To Midnight"	1987	32	28	—	—
"In This World"	1987	47	58	—	—
"Chain Of Love"	1987	48	66	—	—
"Shangri-La"	1988	20	14	15	—
"Read My Lips"	1988	35	33	39	—
"No More Bolero's"	1989	1	1	1	5
"Stay in My Life"	1989	23	21	18	—
"Carazon"	1990	17	17	—	—
"Seasons" (ft. Julian Hartman)	1990	15	63	—	—
"The Drums Are Everywhere"	1991	51	50	—	—
"Tu Solo Tu"	1991	16	12	39	—
"Doo-Whop Days"	1991	46	48	38	—
"A Prayer (Christmas in the Fifties)" (ft. The Jordanaires)	1991	43	39	—	—
"Come Back My Love"	1992	44	48	—	—
"Fandango (In The Name Of Love)"	1992	49	50	—	—
"Liefde Op Het Eerste Gezicht"	1994	25	17	—	—
"Together Again"	1994	38	29	—	—
"Everlasting Love"	1994	44	39	—	—
"Zing Met Me Mee"	1995	22	25	—	—
"Wat Ging Er Mis Tussen Ons"	1996	43	46	—	—
"Without Your Love"	1997	56	74	—	—
"Broadway Nights"	1997	—	92	—	—
"Cry Baby"	1998	53	82	—	—
"Als Ik Met Je Vrij"	1999	—	53	—	—
"Numero Uno"	2000	—	28	—	—
"Op Zoek Naar De Waarheid"	2002	—	46	—	—
"Don't Leave Me This Way"	2004	—	45	—	—
"Somewhere Over The Rainbow"	2005	—	9	—	—
"Maak Me Gek"	2007	2	1	17	—
"Maar Vanavond"	2007	11	5	—	—
"24 Uur Verliefd"	2008	12	4	—	—
"Het Is Nog Niet Voorbij"	2008	10	4	—	—
"Ik Hou D'r Zo Van"	2008	7	1	—	—
"Engel Van Mijn Hart"	2009	31	1	—	—
"Ik Leef Mijn Droom"	2010	20	1	—	—
"Alweer Een Goal"	2010	—	6	—	—
"Hou Je Morgen Nog Steeds Van Mij"	2011	47	3	—	—
"Er Hangt Liefde in De Lucht"	2011	48	3	—	—
"Dan Voel Je Me Beter (Ai Se Eu Te Pego)"	2012	45	—	122	—
"De Nacht Voorbij"	2013	27	1	122	—
"Ik Proost Met Jou"	2014	59	26	—	—
"Rio"	2014	45	1	139	—
"Iedereen Doet 'T"	2015	—	—	127	—
"Lieveling"	2016	60	—	— (Note: "Lieveling" did not enter the Tipparade of Flanders, but did enter the Bubbling Under)	—
"Liefje"	2016	—	—	—	—
"Als De Liefde Niet Bestond"	2016	—	—	—	—
"Vol Gas"	2017	—	—	— (Note: "Vol Gas" did not enter the Tipparade of Flanders, but did enter the Bubbling Under)	—
"The Border"	2018	—	—	— (Note: "The Border" did not enter the Tipparade of Flanders, but did enter the Bubbling Under)	—
"Lekker"	2018	—	—	—	—
"Vakantie"	2018	—	—	—	—
"Christmas on the Dancefloor"	2018	43	—	—	—

=== Featuring ===
Title	Year	Peak chart positions			
Title	Year	NL 40	NL 100	BEL (FL)	GER
"Reach Out And Touch" (Henny Huisman En Soundmixers Voor Zonnebloem)	1985	27	29	—	—
"Everybody Needs A Little Rain" (Gerard Joling & Randy Crawford)	1986	49	44	—	—
"S.O.S. Mozambique" (Dutch Artists Sing For Mozambique)	1987	16	18	—	—
"Can't Take My Eyes Off You" (Gerard Joling & Tatjana Simic)	1992	5	6	26	—
"Heel Even" (Gerard Joling & Shirley Zwerus)	1996	49	40	—	—
"At Your Service" (Gerard Joling & Jan Rietman)	2002	23	15	—	—
"The Lion Sleeps Tonight" (The Cooldown Cafe ft. Gerard Joling)	2003	29	23	—	—
"Live in De Arena" (Gerard, Rene & Gordon)	2004	5	3	—	—
"Over De Top!" (Gerard, Rene & Gordon)	2005	22	6	—	—
"Topper's Party!" (Gerard, Rene & Gordon)	2005	45	32	—	—
"Als Je Alles Hebt Gehad" (Joling & Gordon)	2005	—	34	—	—
"Wir Sind Die Hollander" (Toppers Voor Oranje: Gerard, Rene & Gordon)	2006	18	7	—	—
"Live in the Arena" (Gerard, Rene & Gordon)	2004	45	3	—	—
"Blijf Bij Mij" (Andre Hazes & Gerard Joling)	2007	1	1	64	—
"Can You Feel It?" (Gerard, Rene & Gordon ft. John Marks)	2007	8	10	—	—
"Het Geheim/Ik Kan Niet Wachten" (Diego & Gerard Joling)	2008	35	4	—	—
"Laat Me Alleen" (Gerard Joling & Rita Hovink)	2008	19	1	—	—
"Morgen Wordt Alles Anders" (Bonnie & Gerard)	2010	—	2	—	—
"Echte Vrienden" (Jan Smit & Gerard Joling)	2012	10	1	—	—
"1001 Nacht" (Jeroen, Gerard & Rene)	2013	49	13	—	—
"Mijn Liefde" (Gerard Joling & Jandino)	2013	29	1	—	—
"Een Vriend" (Gerard Joling & Toon Hermans)	2014	—	33	—	—
"Mijn Allergrootste Held" (Gerard Joling & Toon Hermans)	2014	—	—	—	—
"Kijk Goed Uit" (Missie Max Stars)	2014	—	—	—	—
"Niemand Mag Alleen Zijn" (Gordon & Gerard Joling)	2016	—	—	—	—
"Een Heel Gelukkig Kerstfest" (Jeroen, Gerard & Rene)	2016	—	—	— (Note: "Een Heel Gelukkig Kerstfeest" did not enter the Tipparade of Flanders, but did enter the Bubbling Under)	—
"Laat Me Leven" (Gerard Joling & Tino Martin)	2017	—	—	—	—
"De Dochter Van De Groenteboer" (Gebroeders Ko ft. Gerard Joling)	2018	61	129	—	—
"Total Loss" (Snollebolleke ft. Gerard Joling)	2019	55	121	—	—

== Gallery ==
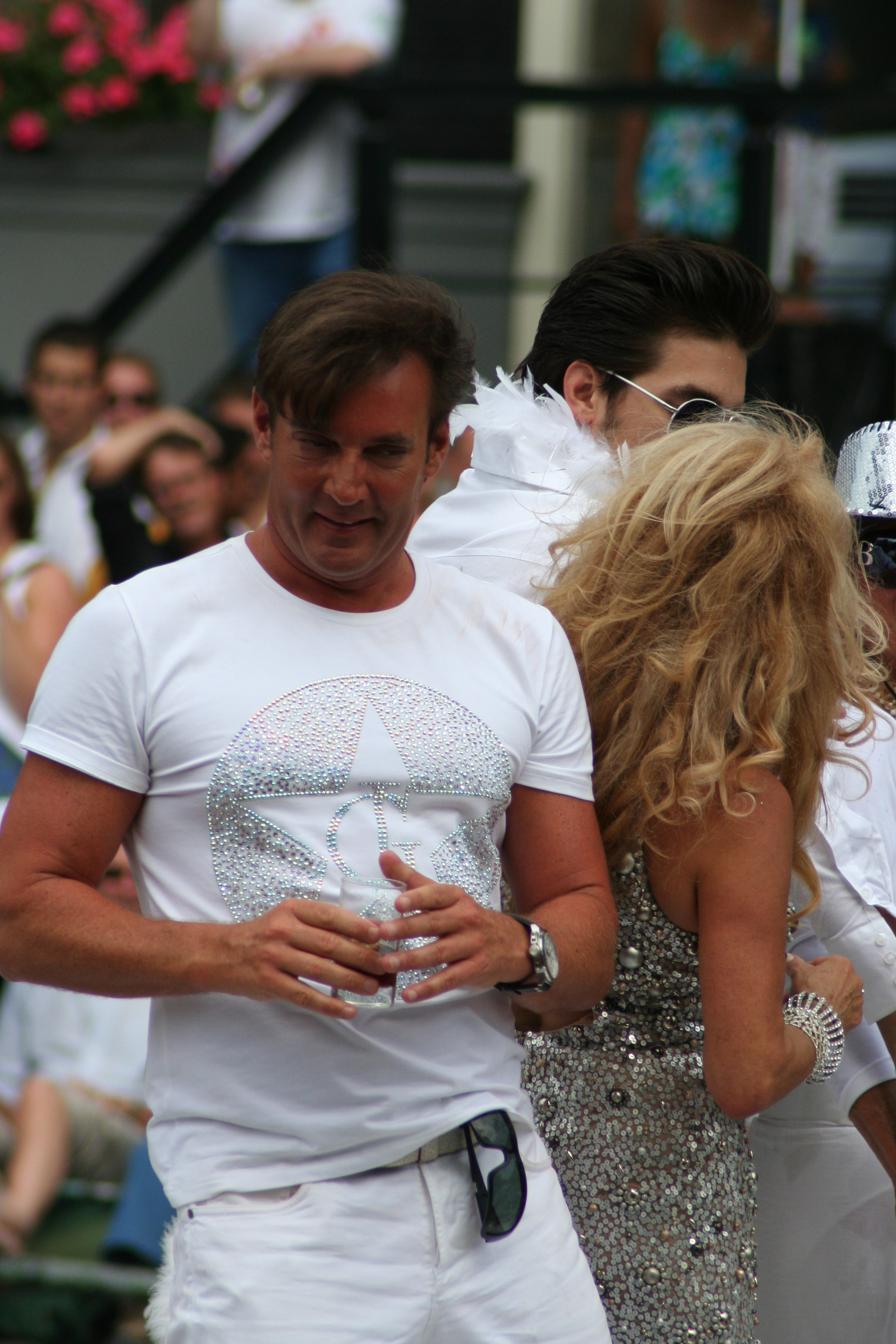
Gerard Joling during the Amsterdam Gay Pride 2009

Awards and achievements
Preceded by Marcha with "Rechtop in de wind"	Netherlands in the Eurovision Song Contest; 1988	Succeeded by Justine Pelmelay with "Blijf zoals je bent"
