= Jan Keizer (singer) =

Dutch singer and composer (born 1949)

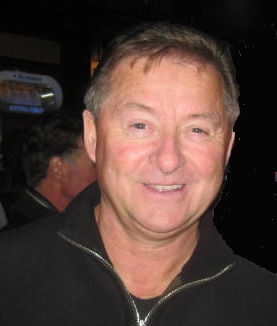
- Keizer in 2008

Background information
- Born: 3 April 1949 (age 77)
- Occupations: Singer, composer

Jan Keizer (born 3 April 1949 in Volendam) is a Dutch singer and composer, best known as one of the singers of the popband BZN.

== Career ==
Keizer began his career in music as a drummer with the band Empty Hearts, which he renamed the Q-tips two years later, after the main guitar player left, and turned it into a close-harmony band. By the late 1960s Keizer joined BZN to replace their drummer, Jaap Sombroek. When the band's lead singer, Jan Veerman, left in 1974 Keizer replaced him.

In 2007, he disbanded BZN. In 2008, he released another solo album Give me your smile. His sixth solo album Chords of Life was released in 2009.

In January 2010, he was on the jury for the TROS singing competition Sterren.nl Academy.

Since then, Keizer has reunited with BZN's singer Anny Schilder.
