= To the Bone (The Kinks album) =

Live album by the Kinks
- Released: 3 October 1994 (original); 15 October 1996 (updated)
- Recorded: August 1993 – April 1994 (original); August 1993 – April 1996 (update)
- Venues: Philadelphia, August 1993; Portsmouth, March 1994
- Studio: Konk Studios
- Genre: Rock
- Length: 101:27 (1996 updated version)
- Label: Konk
- Producers: Ray Davies and Dave Davies

The Kinks chronology
Phobia (1993)	To the Bone (1994)	BBC Sessions: 1964–1977 (2001)

To the Bone is a 1994 live album by the Kinks. Recorded partly at Konk Studios with a small audience, and partly during their 1993 American tour and the 1994 UK tour, it was reissued in an expanded edition in 1996 with two new studio tracks added. To the Bone was the band's final release before their breakup in 1996.

== Production ==
Some tracks were recorded at Konk Studios during April 1994 with a small audience in an Unplugged style, other tracks were recorded live in Portsmouth in March 1994, and "You Really Got Me" was recorded live in Philadelphia in August 1993. All the songs had been previously released as studio recordings.

== Release ==
Released 3 October 1994 in the UK on the band's own Konk label. An EP-single was released off the album to promote its release, "Waterloo Sunset '94", which in addition to a live take of "You Really Got Me" featured the unreleased demos "Elevator Man" and "On the Outside", both recorded in 1976.

In 1996, an expanded double CD-version with 29 tracks was released in the US on Guardian/Konk. Two new studio tracks – "To The Bone" and "Animal" – were included on the double-disc US version, while two tracks on the shorter UK issue – "Waterloo Sunset" and "Autumn Almanac" – were omitted. The US version was released in the UK in 1997.

== Reception ==
Professional ratings
Review scores
Source	Rating
Uncut	4/5 stars

Stephen Thomas Erlewine, in a review for AllMusic, felt that the songs suited the stripped back "Unplugged" style, but the album as a whole was little more than a "pleasant diversion".

== Track listing ==
=== 1994 1-CD UK release ===
All tracks by Ray Davies, except where noted.

1. "All Day and All of the Night" – 4:26
2. "Apeman" – 4:06
3. "Tired of Waiting for You" – 1:49
4. "See My Friends" – 3:24
5. "Death of a Clown" (Ray Davies, Dave Davies) – 2:35
6. "Waterloo Sunset" – 3:20
7. "Muswell Hillbilly" – 3:06
8. "Better Things" – 4:50
9. "Don't Forget to Dance" – 2:38
10. "Autumn Almanac" – 1:54
11. "Sunny Afternoon" – 1:46
12. "Dedicated Follower of Fashion" – 3:54
13. "You Really Got Me" – 3:49

=== 1996 2-CD US release ===
All tracks by Ray Davies, except where noted.

==== Disc one ====
1. "All Day and All of the Night" – 4:26
2. "Apeman" – 4:06
3. "Tired of Waiting for You" – 1:49
4. "See My Friends" – 3:24
5. "Death of a Clown" (Dave Davies) – 2:35
6. "Muswell Hillbilly" – 3:06
7. "Better Things" – 4:50
8. "Don't Forget to Dance" – 2:38
9. "Sunny Afternoon" – 1:46
10. "Dedicated Follower of Fashion" – 3:54
11. "Do It Again" (Acoustic) – 1:46
12. "Do It Again" – 3:55

==== Disc two ====
1. "Celluloid Heroes" – 5:21
2. "Picture Book" – 2:34
3. "The Village Green Preservation Society" – 2:26
4. "Do You Remember Walter?" – 3:44
5. "Set Me Free" – 2:37
6. "Lola" – 4:29
7. "Come Dancing" – 3:53
8. "I'm Not Like Everybody Else" – 5:28
9. "Till the End of the Day" – 2:37
10. "Give the People What They Want" – 3:57
11. "State of Confusion" – 3:24
12. "Dead End Street" – 2:36
13. "A Gallon of Gas" – 5:21
14. "Days" – 3:17
15. "You Really Got Me" – 3:41
16. "Animal" – 3:37
17. "To the Bone" – 4:30

== Personnel ==
- Ray Davies – vocals, acoustic guitar, keyboards
- Dave Davies – lead guitar, vocals, lead vocal on Death of a Clown
- Jim Rodford – bass, backing vocals
- Ian Gibbons – keyboards, backing vocals
- Bob Henrit – drums, percussion
