= State of Confusion (song) =

1983 single by the Kinks

Single by The Kinks

from the album State of Confusion
- B-side: "Labour of Love"
- Released: December 1983
- Recorded: March 1983 at Konk Studios, Hornsey, London
- Genre: Pop rock
- Length: 3:41
- Label: Arista
- Songwriter: Ray Davies
- Producer: Ray Davies

The Kinks singles chronology
"Don't Forget to Dance" (1983)	"State of Confusion" (1983)	"Good Day" (1984)

"State of Confusion" is a song written by Ray Davies and first released by the Kinks as the title track of their 1983 album State of Confusion. Although it was not released as a single in the United States, it reached No. 26 on Billboard's Hot Mainstream Rock Tracks chart. It was released as a single in Continental Europe.

== Lyrics and music ==
The lyrics of "State of Confusion" depict numerous sources of frustration to the singer. Among these are technological failures, such as a television that's "on the blink", a clothes dryer that doesn't work and a video machine that breaks down. In addition, there are more domestic problems as the basement is flooded, the attic has woodworm and the ceiling has collapsed. To make matters worse, when the video machine breaks, the singer's girlfriend gets bored and leaves him. Later in the song, the singer is frustrated by trying to cross the street amidst traffic. The song ends with the singer unable to sleep due to financial worries and concluding that there is "no escape" from the world's "state of confusion". If anything, things get worse as you age.

Ray Davies commented on the song's meaning, "It was a difficult time: '83, '84. Songs like 'Definite Maybe', 'State of Confusion', it's all got this concern about it".

Musically, the music opens with Dave Davies playing guitar chords, onto which Ian Gibbons layers on keyboard part which Ray Davies's biographer Thomas Kitts describes as "thin" and "haunting". Dave Davies then starts playing the guitar riff, described by Kitts as "belligerent", after which Ray Davies lets out a "tormented" scream, before beginning to sing the lyrics of the song. The song's guitar riff is an extension of the riffs played by Dave Davies back to the earliest Kinks' hits, "You Really Got Me" and "All Day and All of the Night".

One theme of the song is the way technology can overwhelm human emotion. Kitts suggests that the word "state" in the song and in the title represents multiple meanings – a psychic state of confusion, as well as the state as the government promoting consumer consumption, as well as the state of popular music which traps the singer, particularly in the video. Music critic Johnny Rogan finds the song a continuation of Davies' "misfit persona" from earlier songs.

== Recording ==
"State of Confusion" was recorded at Konk Studios in Hornsey in March 1983, late in the recording process for the album. The song replaced the original intended title track of the album, "Entertainment".

== Music video ==
The Kinks shot a music video for MTV to support the song. The video depicts Ray Davies facing sources of frustration both at home and in the recording studio. Some of the sources of frustration in the video are different than those depicted in the song lyrics, such as difficulty using a computer and a razor at home, and difficulties with cue cards and a guitar strap in the studio. The video does not depict the girlfriend who moves out, but does show Davies struggling to cross the street. The video ends on a more triumphant note than the song lyrics: after Davies emerges from his dressing room for a performance, he leaps on stage with legs outstretched and the video ends with a freeze frame at the top of the leap. The energetic ending suggests transcending the earlier frustrations, perhaps as a result of the creative act of artistic performance.

== Release ==
"State of Confusion" was released as a single in Europe and as an EP in the UK with "Heart Of Gold" from the State of Confusion album, "Lola" and "20th Century Man" from One for the Road. Although it was not released as a single in the United States, it reached No. 26 on Billboard's Hot Mainstream Rock Tracks chart.

== Critical reception ==
Music critic Johnny Rogan considers "State of Confusion" a "fist-thrusting anthem", finding the singer's mishaps and the chaos he faces "amusing". Music critic Pete Bishop considers the song "solid rock with some dance beat". Author Rob Jovanic claims that it "dashes along with the best pop-rockers of the era, such as "Footloose".

== Other appearances ==
After its initial release on State of Confusion, "State of Confusion" has appeared on a few Kinks compilation albums. It appeared on the 1996 US version of To the Bone, but not on the 1994 UK version.
