= The Ultimate Collection (The Kinks album) =

Greatest hits album by The Kinks
- Released: 27 May 2002
- Recorded: 1964–1984
- Length: 140:49
- Label: Castle

The Kinks chronology
BBC Sessions: 1964–1977 (2001)	The Ultimate Collection (2002)	Picture Book (2008)

Professional ratings
Review scores
Source	Rating
AllMusic	3/5 stars
The Encyclopedia of Popular Music	5/5 stars
Select	4/5

The Ultimate Collection is a compilation of singles by British rock band the Kinks. It was released on Sanctuary Records on 27 May 2002 in the UK and 23 September 2003 in the United States. In June 2002, it reached No. 32 on the UK Albums Chart, and in August 2007, No. 1 on the UK Indie albums chart. It has been certified double platinum by the British Phonographic Industry.

The first disc contains every charting British single from 1964 to 1983 in chronological order. (Singles which did not chart are omitted.) Of the 24 tracks, 14 were top-ten hits in the UK. The second disc contains songs that either were released as B-sides or singles that did not chart in the UK but charted as singles in the North American and/or European markets. As well, the following tracks are included: "Stop Your Sobbing" from the band's debut album and covered in 1979 as the debut single by the Pretenders; "Celluloid Heroes", taken from the album Everybody's in Show-Biz and released as a single three months later, failing to chart; and "Living on a Thin Line" from the album Word of Mouth.

The singles "Death of a Clown" and "Susannah's Still Alive" were credited to Dave Davies rather than the Kinks. The band plays on those records, however.

== Track listing ==
All tracks are written by Ray Davies except "Death of a Clown", "Susannah's Still Alive", "Love Me Till the Sun Shines", and "Living on a Thin Line" by Dave Davies.

Disc one
No.	Title	Original release	Length
1.	"You Really Got Me"	Kinks, 1964	2:13
2.	"All Day and All of the Night"	single, 1964	2:20
3.	"Tired of Waiting for You"	Kinda Kinks, 1965	2:30
4.	"Ev'rybody's Gonna Be Happy"	single, 1965	2:14
5.	"Set Me Free"	single, 1965	2:10
6.	"See My Friends"	single, 1965	2:44
7.	"Till the End of the Day"	The Kink Kontroversy, 1965	2:18
8.	"Dedicated Follower of Fashion"	single, 1966	2:59
9.	"Sunny Afternoon"	Face to Face, 1966	3:31
10.	"Dead End Street"	single, 1966	3:20
11.	"Waterloo Sunset"	Something Else by the Kinks, 1967	3:14
12.	"Death of a Clown"	Something Else by the Kinks	3:01
13.	"Autumn Almanac"	single, 1967	3:10
14.	"Susannah's Still Alive"	single, 1967	2:21
15.	"Wonderboy"	single, 1968	2:48
16.	"Days"	single, 1968	2:52
17.	"Plastic Man"	single, 1969	3:00
18.	"Victoria"	Arthur (Or the Decline and Fall of the British Empire), 1969	3:38
19.	"Lola"	Lola Versus Powerman and the Moneygoround, Part One, 1970	4:05
20.	"Apeman"	Lola Versus Powerman and the Moneygoround, Part One	3:50
21.	"Supersonic Rocket Ship"	Everybody's in Show-Biz, 1972	3:30
22.	"Better Things"	Give the People What They Want, 1981	2:59
23.	"Come Dancing"	State of Confusion, 1983	3:59
24.	"Don't Forget to Dance"	State of Confusion	4:34
Total length:			74:31

Disc two
No.	Title	Original release	Length
1.	"David Watts"	Something Else by the Kinks	2:29
2.	"Stop Your Sobbing"	Kinks	2:06
3.	"Dandy"	Face to Face	2:08
4.	"Mr. Pleasant"	B-side to "Autumn Almanac"	3:00
5.	"I Gotta Move"	Kinks	2:24
6.	"Who'll Be the Next in Line"	B-side to "Ev'rybody's Gonna Be Happy"	2:00
7.	"I Need You"	B-side to "Set Me Free"	2:24
8.	"Where Have All the Good Times Gone"	The Kink Kontroversy	2:48
9.	"Sittin' on My Sofa"	B-side to "Dedicated Follower of Fashion"	3:03
10.	"A Well Respected Man"	Kwyet Kinks, 1965	2:38
11.	"I'm Not Like Everybody Else"	B-side to "Sunny Afternoon"	3:29
12.	"Love Me Till the Sun Shines"	Something Else by the Kinks	3:15
13.	"She's Got Everything"	B-side to "Days"	3:08
14.	"Starstruck"	The Kinks Are the Village Green Preservation Society, 1968	2:25
15.	"Shangri-La"	Arthur (Or the Decline and Fall of the British Empire)	5:18
16.	"God's Children"	Percy, 1971	3:12
17.	"Celluloid Heroes"	Everybody's in Show-Biz	6:20
18.	"(Wish I Could Fly Like) Superman" (12" extended version)	single, 1979	3:50
19.	"Do It Again"	Word of Mouth, 1984	3:58
20.	"Living on a Thin Line"	Word of Mouth	4:16
Total length:			67:18

== Charts ==
Chart performance for The Ultimate Collection
Chart (2002)	Peak position
Australian Albums (ARIA)	37
Danish Albums (Hitlisten)	9
New Zealand Albums (RMNZ)	46
Norwegian Albums (VG-lista)	5
UK Albums (OCC)	32
UK Independent Albums (OCC)	7

2007 chart performance for The Ultimate Collection
Chart (2007)	Peak position
UK Independent Albums (OCC)	1

2020 chart performance for The Ultimate Collection
Chart (2020)	Peak position
Swiss Albums (Schweizer Hitparade)	71

== Certifications ==
Region	Certification	Certified units/sales
United Kingdom (BPI)	2× Platinum	600,000^{‡}
^{‡} Sales+streaming figures based on certification alone.
