= Julien Temple =

British film and music video director

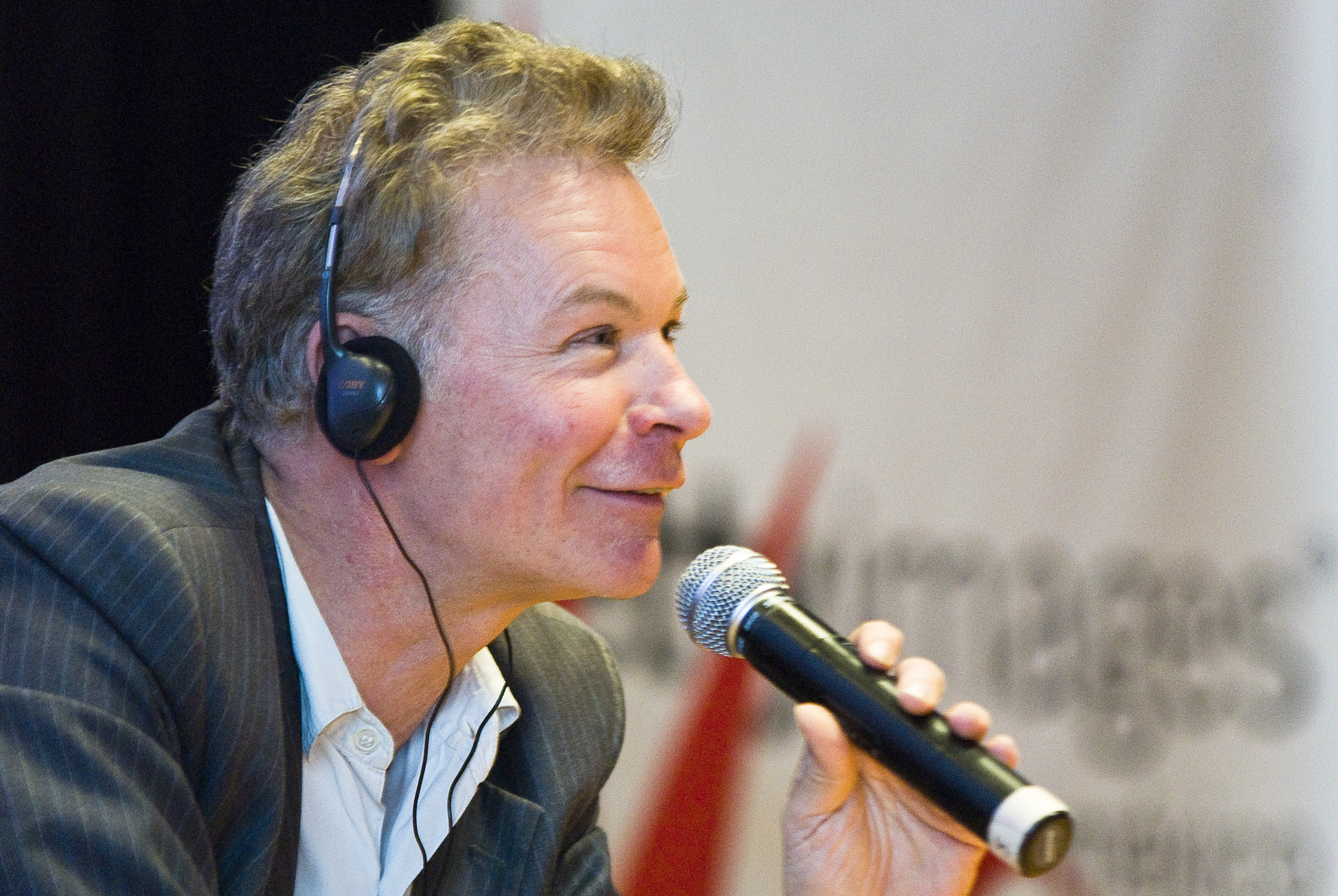
- Temple at a film festival in Mexico in March 2010
- Born: Julien Temple; 26 November 1953 (age 72); Kensington, London, England
- Occupation: Director
- Spouse: Amanda Temple
- Children: 3, including Juno Temple
- Relatives: Nina Temple (sister)

Julien Temple (born 26 November 1953) is a British film, documentary and music video director. He began his career with short films featuring the Sex Pistols, and has continued with various off-beat projects, including The Great Rock 'n' Roll Swindle, Absolute Beginners and a documentary film about Glastonbury.

== Early life ==
Temple was born in Kensington, London, the son of Landon Temple, who organised the travel company Progressive Tours. He was educated at St Marylebone Grammar School (from which he was expelled), William Ellis School, and King's College, Cambridge. He grew up with little interest in film until, when a student at Cambridge, he discovered the works of French anarchist director Jean Vigo. This, along with his interest in the early punk scene in London in 1976, led to his friendship with The Sex Pistols, leading him to document many of their early gigs.

== Career ==
=== 1970s ===
Temple's first film was a short documentary called Sex Pistols Number 1, which set out to show the rise of the band from 1976 to 1977, in a series of short clips from television interviews and gigs. This led to Temple making The Great Rock And Roll Swindle, another documentary. As band members Johnny Rotten and Sid Vicious had left the band by this time, the story of the group is told from the viewpoint of their manager, Malcolm McLaren.

The Great Rock And Roll Swindle tells of the rise of The Sex Pistols, apparently as manipulated by McLaren, and how he had shaped the band throughout their short career. Many of the 'facts' given by McLaren were disputed by John Lydon (who had dropped the Johnny Rotten name after leaving the band), who accused McLaren of using the film to attack him personally. This helped split opinion on the film as, although it was praised for attempting to capture some of the punk scene of the time, it was seen as too skewed towards McLaren's vision. Controversy aside, Temple was praised for his mix of animated scenes, documentary footage, and specially shot footage which he used to tell McLaren's story. This helped launch Temple into a career making music videos, something for which he would be best known for much of his career.

=== 1980s and 1990s ===
In 1983, Temple directed a film for the BBC Arena series called It's All True, named after the 1942 unfinished Orson Welles film. Compered by Welles himself, the film comprised many short segments about the state of the video industry, both real and imagined, many featuring cameos by celebrities including Mel Brooks, Grace Jones, Ray Davies, and Koo Stark. This was followed by Temple's next theatrical release, the short film Jazzin' for Blue Jean featuring David Bowie which was released as a support feature to The Company of Wolves. By 1985, Temple was now well known for being a director of successful music videos by the Kinks, The Rolling Stones, David Bowie and other British artists, several of which were early, groundbreaking, videos for the new MTV channel, but he was yet to direct a major film.

In 1986, Temple directed the film version of Colin MacInnes' book Absolute Beginners. One of the most expensive films in British history, the fate of the studios involved (as well as several careers) were dependent on the success of the film. The film was critically panned in the UK. As it was a musical, rather than a straight adaptation of the book, it was attacked for a lack of narrative; it was also called "a series of badly-linked music videos". Absolute Beginners was financially unsuccessful and was partly responsible for the Goldcrest company going bankrupt. Temple found himself being blamed personally for the failure. He moved to the United States, where he directed Earth Girls Are Easy, as well as a series of music videos for such artists as Duran Duran, Janet Jackson, Neil Young and Tom Petty. He set up the Nitrate Film production company in 1986 with his wife, producer Amanda Temple.

Temple returned to the UK in the late 1990s, where he continued to make films and music videos. Vigo: Passion for Life (1998) recounts the passionate relationship between French film maker Jean Vigo (1905–34) and his wife Lydou, who both suffered from tuberculosis. The film was not well received. A reviewer in Sight & Sound commented that the film "although absolutely faithful to the facts, is absolutely dreadful".

=== 2000s ===
Films which followed included Pandæmonium (2001), a critically acclaimed film about the friendship between Romantic poets Samuel Taylor Coleridge and William Wordsworth, and The Filth and the Fury (2000), another documentary about The Sex Pistols. This time the film was made with the full cooperation of the surviving members of the band and told the story of the band from their viewpoint. This film mixed newly shot footage and interviews with footage culled from The Great Rock and Roll Swindle and previously unseen interviews. The film was a critical success and was seen as setting the record straight in regard to the history of The Sex Pistols.

Between 2002 and 2005, Temple completed a feature-length documentary about the Glastonbury Festival. This involved him shooting footage at the festival as well as drawing on the vast amount of archival footage, as well as footage sent in by fans of the festival. It was released in the UK in April 2006.

In 2006, Temple made a film of the life of his friend, in Joe Strummer: The Future Is Unwritten. It premiered in January 2007.

In November 2007, Temple filmed several of the Sex Pistols' comeback shows at the Brixton Academy in London. This was followed by several filming sessions with each member of the band as they re-visited their old London haunts. The footage was assembled into a new documentary film released on DVD in 2008 as The Sex Pistols: There'll Always Be An England, bringing Temple's association with the Sex Pistols up to date.

In June 2008, Temple filmed three concerts by Madness at the Hackney Empire. These concerts were previews of the band's forthcoming album, The Liberty of Norton Folgate.

In 2009, Temple directed the third film in his punk trilogy, Oil City Confidential, which celebrated the Canvey Island legends Dr. Feelgood, and a hymn to the Motor City entitled Requiem For Detroit? (2010).

=== 2010s ===
In 2010, Temple directed the biography Ray Davies: Imaginary Man. Previously, he had directed several Kinks videos. Also, he was referred to by name in The Kinks song Too Hot from their Word of Mouth album: "Julien's on the street today/ Scouting out locations..."

In 2011, Temple returned to Glastonbury to further document the legendary festival. The resulting 75-minute film, titled "Glastonbury After Hours: Glastopia", was shot on location in the Shangri-La, Arcadia, the Unfair Ground, Strummerville, Block 9 and the Common areas. It was premiered on BBC4 on 15 June 2012.

On 4 March 2013, it was announced that Jesse L. Martin would replace Lenny Kravitz as Marvin Gaye in Sexual Healing, directed by Temple, and produced by Vassal Benton and Fred Bestall. With approximately 70% of the film completed and only three weeks to go on a planned nine-and-a-half-week shoot, production was stopped on the biopic, primarily due to financial problems. (Crew members were said to have not been paid fully for their work on the film.)

== Personal life ==
With his wife, Amanda (Pirie) Temple, Temple has a daughter, the actress Juno, and two sons.

His sister, Nina Temple, was the last General Secretary of the Communist Party of Great Britain.

== Filmography ==
- UK Subs: Punk Can Take It (1979)
- Biceps of Steel (1980)
- The Great Rock 'n' Roll Swindle (1980)
- The Secret Policeman's Other Ball (1982)
- It's All True (1983)
- Mantrap (1983)
- Running out of Luck (1985)
- Absolute Beginners (1986)
- Aria (segment Rigoletto) (1987)
- Earth Girls Are Easy (1988)
- Stones at the Max (1991)
- Bullet (1996)
- Vigo: Passion for Life (1998)
- The Filth and the Fury (2000)
- Pandæmonium (2001)
- Glastonbury (2006)
- Joe Strummer: The Future Is Unwritten (2007)
- The Sex Pistols: There'll Always Be An England (2008)
- The Eternity Man (2008)
- Oil City Confidential (2009)
- ¿Requiem For Detroit? (2009)
- Ray Davies - Imaginary Man (2010)
- Paul Weller: Find the Torch (2011)
- Dave Davies - Kinkdom Come (2011)
- London: The Modern Babylon (2012)
- Glastonbury After Hours: Glastopia (2012)
- You Really Got Me (forthcoming)
- Christmas with the Sex Pistols (2013)
- Rio 50 Degrees: Carry On CaRIOca (2014)
- The Clash: New Year's Day '77 (2015), largely at the official gala opening of The Roxy club on 1 January 1977
- The Ecstasy of Wilko Johnson (2015)
- The Strypes: Best Thing Since Cavan (2015)
- The Origin of the Species (2016)
- Habaneros (2017)
- Ibiza: The Silent Movie (2019)
- Crock of Gold: A Few Rounds with Shane MacGowan (2020)
- Sexual Healing (post-production)

=== Music videos ===
Year	Song	Artist	Notes	Ref.
1977	"God Save the Queen"	Sex Pistols		
1978	"My Way"	Sid Vicious		
1979	"Hey Hey, My My (Into the Black)"	Neil Young		
1980	"Breaking the Law"	Judas Priest		
1980	"Living After Midnight"	Judas Priest		
1980	"Argent trop cher"	Téléphone		
1980	"My Perfect Cousin"	The Undertones		
1981	"She's Got Claws"	Gary Numan		
1981	"Magnetic Fields Part 2"	Jean Michel Jarre		
1981	"Don't Go"	Judas Priest		
1981	"Heading Out to the Highway"	Judas Priest		
1981	"Hot Rockin'"	Judas Priest		
1981	"Rock This Town"	Stray Cats		
1981	"Stray Cat Strut"	Stray Cats		
1981	"Predictable"	The Kinks		
1981	"It's Going to Happen!"	The Undertones		
1982	"Save It for Later"	The Beat		
1982	"Poison Arrow"	ABC		
1982	"Do You Really Want to Hurt Me"	Culture Club		
1982	"See You"	Depeche Mode		
1982	"The Meaning of Love"	Depeche Mode		
1982	"Leave in Silence"	Depeche Mode		
1982	"Come on Eileen"	Dexys Midnight Runners		
1982	"You've Got Another Thing Comin'"	Judas Priest		
1982	"Come Dancing"	The Kinks		
1983	"Freewheel Burning"	Judas Priest		
1983	"Don't Forget to Dance"	The Kinks		
1983	"State of Confusion"	The Kinks		
1983	"Too Much Blood"	The Rolling Stones		
1983	"Undercover of the Night"	The Rolling Stones		
1984	Jazzin' for Blue Jean	David Bowie	Short promo film for "Blue Jean"	
1984	"Do It Again"	The Kinks		
1984	"She Was Hot"	The Rolling Stones		
1984	"Smooth Operator"	Sade		
1985	"The Oak Tree"	Morris Day		
1986	"Absolute Beginners"	David Bowie		
1986	"Don't Need a Gun"	Billy Idol		
1986	"Cry for Love"	Iggy Pop		
1986	"When I Think of You"	Janet Jackson		
1987	"Day-In Day-Out"	David Bowie		
1988	"This Note's for You"	Neil Young		
1989	"Planet Texas"	Kenny Rogers		
1989	"No More"	Neil Young		
1989	"Rockin' in the Free World"	Neil Young		
1989	"Tin Machine"	Tin Machine	Short promo video shown in cinemas before the 1989 film Lenny Live and Unleashed	
1989	"Free Fallin'"	Tom Petty		
1989	"Yer So Bad"	Tom Petty		
1989	"Forever Blue"	Swing Out Sister		
1990	"World on Fire"	Jane Wiedlin	24 May 1990	
1990	"Alright"	Janet Jackson		
1990	"F*!#in' Up"	Neil Young		
1990	"Over and Over"	Neil Young		
1990	"I'm Your Baby Tonight"	Whitney Houston		
1990	"Hold On"	Wilson Phillips		
1990	"Let the Rhythm Hit 'Em"	Eric B. & Rakim		
1990	"Jerk Out"	The Time	2 July 1990	
1991	"Don't Rock the Jukebox"	Alan Jackson		
1991	"(Everything I Do) I Do It For You"	Bryan Adams		
1991	"Highwire"	The Rolling Stones		
1991	"King of the Hill" (feat. Tom Petty)	Roger McGuinn		
1991	"Into the Great Wide Open"	Tom Petty and the Heartbreakers		
1991	"Learning to Fly"	Tom Petty and the Heartbreakers		
1992	"Black Sunshine"	Me Phi Me		
1992	"Pu' Sho Hands 2Getha"	Me Phi Me		
1992	"Sad New Day"	Me Phi Me		
1992	"Harvest Moon"	Neil Young		
1992	"Elvis on Velvet"	Stray Cats		
1993	"Adam in Chains"	Billy Idol		
1993	"For Tomorrow"	Blur		
1993	"Come Undone"	Duran Duran		
1993	"Too Much Information"	Duran Duran		
1993	"I'm Gonna Soothe You"	Maria McKee		
1994	"The Eyes of Truth"	Enigma		
1994	"Return to Innocence"	Enigma		
1994	"Pincushion"	ZZ Top		
1996	"Beyond the Invisible"	Enigma		
1997	"Beautiful Night"	Paul McCartney		
2001	"Have You Ever"	S Club 7		
2002	"You"	S Club 7		
2002	"One Step Closer"	S Club Juniors		
2004	"Mary"	Scissor Sisters		
2006	"Love You But You're Green"	Babyshambles		
2006	"The Blinding"	Babyshambles		
2009	"Postcard From London"	Ray Davies		
