= Heart of Gold (The Kinks song) =

Song by The Kinks

from the album State of Confusion
- Released: 10 June 1983
- Recorded: January 1983 at Konk Studios, London
- Genre: Rock
- Length: 4:02
- Label: Arista
- Songwriter: Ray Davies
- Producer: Ray Davies

"Heart of Gold" is a song by the British rock band the Kinks. Written by Ray Davies, the song appeared on the band's 1983 album State of Confusion.

== Background ==
"Heart of Gold" is an acoustic ballad in half-time. Music critic John Mendelsohn describes it as being country music-ish. Musician magazine finds the guitar work reminiscent of the Kinks earlier album Muswell Hillbillies. It was, according to Ray Davies, written about the birth of his and Pretenders front woman Chrissie Hynde's daughter, Natalie, in 1983. According to Davies, it was also inspired by a comment by Anne, Princess Royal in which she told intrusive photographers to "naff off". Davies had stated "I wrote about it imagining I was a photographer, but really it was about Chrissie having her first baby. Both she and Princess Anne seem to be quite anonymous people at times." However, Mendelsohn does not find the claim that the song was inspired by Princess Anne to be very credible. Musician describes the song's protagonist as being "tough but tender". Mendelsohn describes her as having "an abrasive exterior and a new baby daughter". The song was recorded in early 1983, at the same time as "Young Conservatives" (which precedes the song in State of Confusion's running order).

== Release and reception ==
"Heart of Gold" was first released as the ninth track on State of Confusion (eighth on non-cassette versions of the album). It has since appeared on compilation albums such as Come Dancing with The Kinks and Picture Book, as well as the box set The Arista Years.

The song was cited as a highlight from State of Confusion by AllMusic critic Stephen Thomas Erlewine, who also described it as "charming". Musician also found it to be one of the "best moments" from the album. Music critic John Mendelsohn claimed that "in a better world, 'Heart of Gold'...would have been an even bigger hit than 'Come Dancing.'" Mendelsohn particularly praised the "bright acoustic guitars and grin-inducing Davies brothers harmonies on the choruses".
