= BBC Sessions: 1964–1977 =

Live album compilation by The Kinks
- Released: 12 March 2001
- Recorded: 1964–1974
- Genre: Rock
- Length: 103:08
- Label: Sanctuary

The Kinks chronology
To the Bone (1994)	BBC Sessions: 1964–1977 (2001)	The Ultimate Collection (2002)

BBC Sessions: 1964–1977 is a compilation album by English rock group the Kinks collecting live tracks recorded for the BBC, released on 12 March 2001. Despite the title, the latest tracks on this compilation were recorded in 1974.

== Reception ==
Editors at AllMusic rated this album 4 out of 5 stars, with critic Jack Rabid writing that "the early Kinks could be even rawer and more exciting in BBC halls than on their known Pye Records recordings" and emphasizing the early recordings by stating that "the first 19 tracks are indispensable". In The Austin Chronicle, Kent H. Benjamin gave this compilation the same score, stating that "many of the tracks substantially exceed their tinny-sounding studio counterparts, and most of the Kinks' early hits appear in sizzling, sloppy live takes that are British Invasion pop at its best".

Cincinnati CityBeat's Brad Quinn also states that certain tracks are superior to the album versions and points out highlights on the second disc, which he considers inferior to the first. Ryan Kearney of Pitchfork rated this album a 6.5 out of 10, praising many early tracks, but criticizing several of the latter ones and also omissions of key Kinks songs, summing up that this is "mildly interesting" and "must be deemed worthwhile for completists only".

Writing in Rolling Stone, Marc Weingarten scored this release 4 out of 5 stars, and called it "an embarrassment of riches" and recommends it for new listeners to the band. That publication also issued an overview of the band's work in 2019 and characterized this album as a "going deeper" album to listen to, stating that "BBC Sessions is the place to experience their prime live power" and recommended it over other live recordings.

== Track listing ==
All songs written by Ray Davies, except where noted

Disc one

1. interview – 0:09
2. "You Really Got Me" (30 October 1964 at Playhouse Theatre, London) – 2:16
3. interview – 1:10
4. "Cadillac" (Ellas McDaniel, 7 September 1964 at Playhouse Theatre, London) – 2:36
5. "All Day and All of the Night" (30 October 1964 at Playhouse Theatre, London) – 2:22
6. "Tired of Waiting For You" (20 April 1965 at BBC Maida Vale Studios, London) – 2:22
7. "Ev'rybody's Gonna Be Happy" (20 April 1965 at BBC Maida Vale Studios, London) – 2:13
8. "See My Friends" (6 August 1965 at BBC Aeolian Hall, Studio 1, London) – 2:52
9. "This Strange Effect" (6 August 1965 at BBC Aeolian Hall, Studio 1, London) – 2:32
10. "Milk Cow Blues" (Sleepy John Estes, 10 August 1965 at Playhouse Theatre, London) – 2:37
11. "Wonder Where My Baby Is Tonight" (10 August 1965 at Playhouse Theatre, London) – 1:51
12. "Till the End of the Day" (13 December 1965 at Playhouse Theatre, London) – 2:19
13. "Where Have All the Good Times Gone" (13 December 1965 at Playhouse Theatre, London) – 3:25
14. "Death of a Clown" (Dave Davies and R. Davies, 4 August 1967 at Playhouse Theatre, London) – 3:33
15. "Love Me Till the Sun Shines" (D. Davies, 1 July 1968 at BBC Piccadilly Studio 1, London) – 2:56
16. "Harry Rag" (25 October 1967 at BBC Maida Vale Studio 4, London) – 2:18
17. "Good Luck Charm" (D. Davies and John Koerner 4 August 1967 at Playhouse Theatre, London) – 1:21
18. "Waterloo Sunset" (1 July 1968 at BBC Piccadilly Studio 1, London) – 2:16
19. "Monica" (9 July 1968 at Playhouse Theatre, London) – 2:09
20. "Days" (1 July 1968 at BBC Piccadilly Studio 1, London) – 3:38
21. "The Village Green Preservation Society" (26 November 1968 at Playhouse Theatre, London) – 2:53

Disc two

1. "Mindless Child of Motherhood" (D. Davies, 18 May 1970 at Aeolian Hall, Studio 2, London) – 2:57
2. "Holiday" (5 May 1972 at Studio T1, Transcription Service, Kensington House, London) – 3:12
3. "Demolition" (6 June 1974 at Langham Studios, Studio 1, London) – 4:28
4. "Victoria" (14 July 1974 at Hippodrome Theatre, Golders Green, London) – 3:30
5. "Here Comes Yet Another Day" (14 July 1974 at Hippodrome Theatre, Golders Green, London) – 4:46
6. "Money Talks" (14 July 1974 at Hippodrome Theatre, Golders Green, London) – 4:17
7. "Mirror of Love" (14 July 1974 at Hippodrome Theatre, Golders Green, London) – 4:19
8. "Celluloid Heroes" (14 July 1974 at Hippodrome Theatre, Golders Green, London) – 5:39
9. "Skin and Bone"/"Dry Bones" (R. Davies/traditional 14 July 1974 at Hippodrome Theatre, Golders Green, London) – 5:10
10. "Get Back in Line" (14 July 1974 at Hippodrome Theatre, Golders Green, London) – 4:10
11. "Did You See His Name?" (March 1968 at Pye Studios [No. 2], London) – 1:59
12. "When I Turn Off the Living Room Light" (4 February 1969 at BBC's Riverside Sound Studios, Hammersmith, London) – 2:21
13. "Skin and Bone" (5 May 1972 at Studio T1, Transcription Service, Kensington House, London) – 2:38
14. "Money Talks" (6 June 1974 at Langham Studios, Studio 1, London) – 3:55

== Personnel ==
The Kinks

- Mick Avory – drums
- Dave Davies – lead guitar; backing vocals; lead vocals on "Wonder Where My Baby Is Tonight", "Death of a Clown", "Good Luck Charm", and "Mindless Child of Motherhood"; co-lead vocals on "Milk Cow Blues"; piano on "Get Back in the Line"
- Ray Davies – rhythm guitar; lead vocals; piano on "Ev'rybody's Gonna Be Happy", "This Strange Effect", "Wonder Where My Baby Is Tonight", "The Village Green Preservation Society", and "When I Turn Off the Living Room Lights"; organ on "The Village Green Preservation Society" and "Did You See His Name?"; harmonica on "Cadillac" and "Victoria"; production on "Did You See His Name?"
- John Dalton – bass guitar (November 1968 recording onward)
- John Gosling – electric piano, piano, organ (1970s recordings)
- Pete Quaife – bass guitar and backing vocals (through July 1968 recordings)

Additional performers

- John Beecham – trombone on "Here Comes Yet Another Day", "Money Talks", and "Skin and Bone"; tuba on "Mirror of Love"
- Alan Black – introduction on "Victoria"
- Laurie Brown – trumpet on "Here Comes Yet Another Day" and "Money Talks"
- Rasa Davies – backing vocals on "Death of a Clown"
- Claire Hamill – backing vocals on "Victoria", "Money Talks"
- Alan Holmes – tenor saxophone on "Here Comes Yet Another Day" and "Money Talks", and "Skin and Bone"; clarinet on "Mirror of Love" and "Holiday"
- Nicky Hopkins – piano on "Death of a Clown", "Harry Rag", "Good Luck Charm", and "Waterloo Sunset"; Mellotron on "Days"; organ on "Love Me Till the Sun Shines"
- Maryann Price – backing vocals on "Here Comes Yet Another Day", "Money Talks"
- Michael Rosen – trumpet on "Skin and Bone"
- Pam Travis – backing vocals on "Here Comes Yet Another Day", "Victoria", "Money Talks"

Technical personnel

- Bill Aitken – engineering on "Here Comes Yet Another Day", "Money Talks", "Mirror of Love", "Celluloid Heroes", and "Skin and Bone" / "Dry Bones"
- Bernie Andrews – production on "Cadillac", "Love Me Till the Sun Shines", "Harry Rag", "Waterloo Sunset", and "Days"
- Keith Bateson – production on "See My Friend", "This Strange Effect", and "Monica"
- Bill Bebb – production on "Death of a Clown", "Good Luck Charm", and "The Village Green Preservation Society"
- Bob Conduct – engineering on "Skin and Bone" and "Money Talks"
- John Edgehill – engineering on "Demolition", production on "Victoria"
- Hugh Gilmour – artwork, design
- Jimmy Grant – production on "Milk Cow Blues", "Wonder Where My Baby Is Tonight", "Till the End of the Day", and "Where Have All the Good Times Gone"
- Jeff Griffin – production on "Demolition", "Victoria", and "Get Back in the Line"
- Steve Hammonds – release coordination
- Doug Hinman – annotation, research
- Andrew Pearce – remastering at Masterpiece
- Andrew Sandoval – research
- Russell Smith – liner notes, research
- David Symonds – engineering
- John Walters – production on "Skin and Bone" and "Money Talks"
- Brian Wiley – production on "Milk Cow Blues", "Wonder Where My Baby Is Tonight", "Till the End of the Day", and "Where Have All the Good Times Gone"
- Paul Williams – production on "Mindless Child of Motherhood"
- Tony Wilson – production on "Here Comes Yet Another Day", "Money Talks", "Mirror of Love", "Celluloid Heroes", "Skin and Bone" / "Dry Bones", and "Get Back in the Line"
