= There'll Always Be an England (film) =

There'll Always Be an England is a 2008 concert film and documentary featuring the Sex Pistols.

== Information ==
There'll Always Be an England was directed by Julien Temple, who directed the band's previous documentaries The Great Rock and Roll Swindle and The Filth and the Fury. It is a live concert film of the Sex Pistols' November 2007 Brixton Academy shows celebrating the 30th Anniversary of Never Mind the Bollocks, Here's the Sex Pistols.

== Track listing ==
1. "There'll Always Be an England" (intro)
2. "Pretty Vacant"
3. "Seventeen"
4. "No Feelings"
5. "New York"
6. "Did You No Wrong"
7. "Liar"
8. "Beside the Seaside"
9. "Holidays in the Sun"
10. "Submission"
11. "(I'm Not Your) Stepping Stone"
12. "No Fun"
13. "Problems"
14. "God Save the Queen"
15. "EMI"
16. "Bodies"
17. "Anarchy in the UK"
18. "Road Runner" (bonus track)

== Special features ==
- The Knowledge - The Pistols guide to London
- John Lydon's open-top bus ride
