= State of Confusion =

Studio album by the Kinks
- Released: 24 May 1983
- Recorded: September 1982 – March 1983
- Studios: Konk Studios, London (except "Bernadette": mid-1981)
- Genres: Pop; hard rock
- Length: 41:20 (LP); 51:21 (cassette)
- Label: Arista
- Producer: Ray Davies

The Kinks chronology
Give the People What They Want (1981)	State of Confusion (1983)	Word of Mouth (1984)

Singles from State of Confusion
- 1. "Come Dancing" Released: 19 November 1982; 2. "Don't Forget to Dance" Released: 1 August 1983; 3. "State of Confusion" Released: December 1983 (Germany)

State of Confusion is the twentieth studio album by the English rock group the Kinks, released in 1983. The record features the single "Come Dancing", which hit number 6 on the Billboard Hot 100 and was one of the band's biggest hit singles in the United States, equaling the 1965 peak of "Tired of Waiting for You". The album itself was a major success, peaking at number 12 on the Billboard albums chart. The album was certified gold in Canada by August 1983. It was the last Kinks album on which drummer Mick Avory appeared as a full member of the band.

== Production ==
The album was recorded between September 1982 and March 1983 at Konk Studios, London, and was produced by Ray Davies. It was recorded during another period of turmoil for the band, as Ray recalled:

It was a difficult time: '83, '84. Songs like 'Definite Maybe', 'State of Confusion', it's all got this concern about it. If you look at the album cover, everybody's going in different directions. And that was the last of ... that band's records. And it had our biggest single on it. So there you go.

== Release ==
The cassette versions of the album included two additional tracks at the end of both sides: "Long Distance" and "Noise". The former was also released as one of the two B-sides on the "Do It Again" single in Germany (the other being "Guilty"), while the latter was the B-side to "Come Dancing" single.

State of Confusion was reissued on CD in 1999. It featured shorter version of "Bernadette" than the original LP release and included four bonus tracks, two of which were previously unreleased: "Don't Forget to Dance" (Original extended edit) and "Once a Thief".

== Reception ==
Professional ratings
Review scores
Source	Rating
AllMusic	3/5 stars
Blender	5/5 stars
The Encyclopedia of Popular Music	4/5 stars
Rolling Stone	4/5 stars
Uncut	4/5 stars

State of Confusion saw acclaim from American critics. Rolling Stone commented, "Nobody but the Kinks could have made such a record in 1983, and no band deserves more to be at the very top, which is where this LP ought to place them".

The track "Long Distance", which only appeared on the cassette version of the album, has generally received positive reviews from critics. Stephen Thomas Erlewine of AllMusic retrospectively praised the track as "wistful pop", and went on to call it a "terrific obscurity". Rolling Stone critic Parke Puterbaugh hailed the song as "astonishingly Dylanesque", and went on to say that "there's no excuse for omitting ['Long Distance' from the LP version of State of Confusion]".

== Track listing ==
All tracks are written by Ray Davies.

Side one
No.	Title	Length
1.	"State of Confusion"	3:41
2.	"Definite Maybe"	4:27
3.	"Labour of Love"	3:54
4.	"Come Dancing"	3:54
5.	"Property"	4:19

Side two
No.	Title	Length
1.	"Don't Forget to Dance"	4:34
2.	"Young Conservatives"	3:58
3.	"Heart of Gold"	4:02
4.	"Clichés of the World (B Movie)"	4:51
5.	"Bernadette"	3:41

=== Additional tracks on the end of both sides on the Cassette edition ===
Side one
No.	Title	Length
6.	"Noise"	4:38

Side two
No.	Title	Length
6.	"Long Distance"	5:23

CD reissue bonus tracks
No.	Title	Length
11.	"Don't Forget to Dance" (Original extended edit)	5:09
12.	"Once a Thief"	4:06
13.	"Long Distance"	5:23
14.	"Noise"	4:38

== Personnel ==
The Kinks

- Ray Davies – lead vocals, rhythm guitar, synthesizer, piano
- Dave Davies – lead guitar, vocals (lead vocals on "Bernadette")
- Mick Avory – drums
- Jim Rodford – bass guitar
- Ian Gibbons – keyboards

Technical

- Written and Produced by Raymond Douglas Davies
- John Rollo – engineer
- Damian Korner – engineer
- Bob Ludwig – mastering engineer
- Howard Fritzson – album design
- Robert Ellis – photography
