= Come Dancing (song) =

1982 single by the Kinks

- US 7-inch 45 cover

Single by the Kinks

from the album State of Confusion
- B-side: "Noise"
- Released: 19 November 1982
- Recorded: October 1982
- Studio: Konk, Hornsey, London
- Genre: Pop rock; new wave
- Length: 3:54
- Label: Arista
- Songwriter: Ray Davies
- Producer: Ray Davies

The Kinks UK singles chronology
"Predictable" (1981)	"Come Dancing" (1982)	"Don't Forget to Dance" (1983)

The Kinks US singles chronology
"Better Things" (1981)	"Come Dancing" (1983)	"Don't Forget to Dance" (1983)

Music video
- "Come Dancing" on YouTube

Audio sample
- file; help

"Come Dancing" is a 1982 song written by Ray Davies and performed by British rock group the Kinks on their 1983 album State of Confusion. The song was inspired by Davies' memories of his older sister, Rene, who died of a heart attack while dancing at a dance hall. The lyrics, sung from the perspective of an "East End barrow boy", are about the boy's sister going on dates at a local Palais dance hall.

When first released as a single in the United Kingdom in November 1982, "Come Dancing" failed to chart. Although Arista Records founder Clive Davis had reservations about releasing the single in the United States due to the English subject matter of dance halls, the track saw an American single release in April 1983. "Come Dancing" reached number six on the Hot 100, becoming the band's highest-charting US single in over a decade and tying with "Tired of Waiting for You" as the band's highest-charting single ever. This success was achieved largely with the help of a promotional music video directed by Julien Temple that received frequent airplay on MTV. As a result of its American success, the single was re-released in Britain. Unlike its first release, the single became a top 20 British hit, reaching number 12.

In addition to its presence on State of Confusion, "Come Dancing" has appeared on numerous compilations albums since its release. It spawned a successful follow-up single, "Don't Forget to Dance", which became a top 40 hit in the United States. Come Dancing, a musical written by Ray Davies that premiered in 2008, was named after the song.

== Background ==
"Come Dancing" is a tribute to Davies' older sister Rene. Living in Canada with her reportedly abusive husband, the 31-year-old Rene was visiting her childhood home in Fortis Green in London at the time of Ray Davies' 13th birthday—21 June 1957—on which she surprised him with a gift of the Spanish guitar he had tried to persuade his parents to buy him. That evening, Rene, who had a weak heart as a result of a childhood bout of rheumatic fever, suffered a fatal heart attack while dancing at the Lyceum ballroom.

[Rene] had died dancing in a ballroom in London in the arms of a stranger. ... Coming back from Canada where she'd emigrated [from the U.K.] to die, really, and again, being a source of inspiration. ... She gave me my first guitar, which was quite a great parting gift.

— Ray Davies

Ray later said that the song was an attempt to return to the "warmer" style they had prior to their transformation to an arena rock act, explaining, "I wanted to regain some of the warmth I thought we'd lost, doing those stadium tours. 'Come Dancing' was an attempt to get back to roots, about my sisters' memories of dancing in the '50s."

Davies later said that the song was about a type of petty criminal known as a spiv, saying, "it was about an East End spiv, sung in a London voice. If anybody had lost any faith in us being real people, that record ['Come Dancing'] would restore it." Davies also said that the song was sung from a street peddler or "barrow boy's" point of view, saying, "['Come Dancing'] is sung by an East End barrow boy—I think there's cockney rhyming slang in it!"

== Writing and recording ==
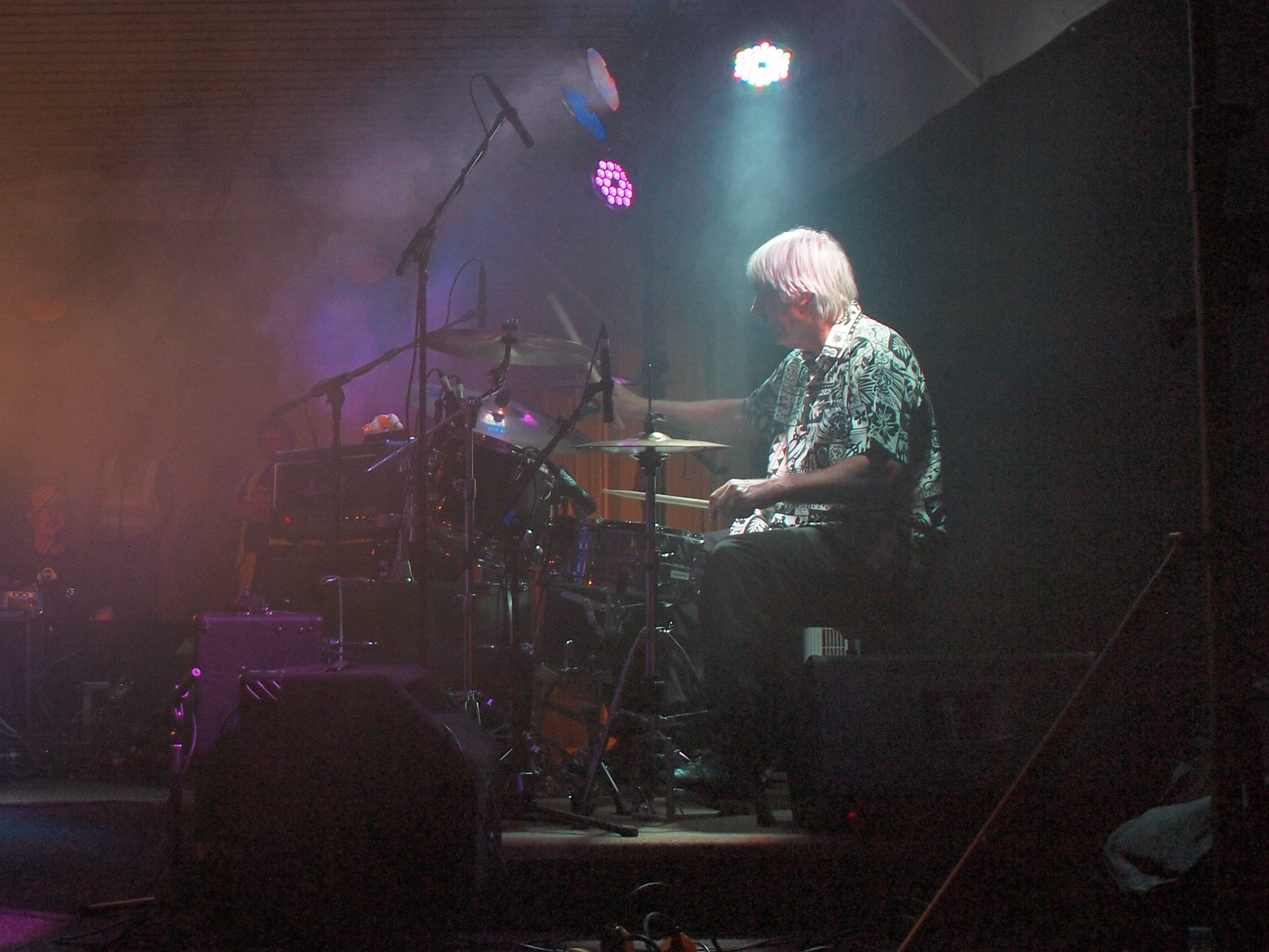
Mick Avory's drum performance on "Come Dancing" has since received praise from Ray Davies.

In a 1983 interview, Ray Davies said that writing the song was an "easy" and quick process, but the idea for the song had been in his head for a long time. He reportedly began writing the song in March 1982 on a flight home from Tokyo using a newly purchased Casio keyboard. The song was completed in London that October. Author Nick Hasted claimed that the song was also written "to reach out to the Kinks' lost British audience." The opening verse appears to be a development of the first line of Lionel Bart's Fings Ain't Wot They Used T'Be: "They changed our local Palais into a bowling alley."

A demo for the song was created at Konk Studios, the recording facility in Hornsey that Ray Davies owned, in October 1982. A master backing track with bass, acoustic guitar, and drums was made during that same month, with overdubs following. Dave Davies later claimed that the recording was completed on the day after an intense argument with brother Ray. Also completed that month was "Don't Forget to Dance", which later competed with "Come Dancing" for the A-side of the first single from State of Confusion.

In the song, Ray Davies sang in a strong British accent, later claiming that he "tried to retain the Englishness." While recording "Come Dancing", he was asked to sing in an American accent, a request he denied: "Back when the Kinks were recording 'Come Dancing,' which was a big hit in the States, the record company actually asked me to sing it in more of an American accent. I just refused." Ray has singled out Mick Avory's drum performance on the song, saying, "Just keep Mick Avory nervous, and you'll get great performances from him. He's responsible for some of the great comedy drum parts. His drum roll into 'Come Dancing,' ... it's totally a beat late. It's totally unplanned, and that's what was so magical, when we were rolling."

== Release ==
Clive Davis didn't want to put it out, because he thought it was too vaudevillian, too English. It was only the video that convinced him. It went on MTV when it first started, and they couldn't stop rotating it.

— Ray Davies

When deciding the band's next single, Ray Davies pushed for "Come Dancing" to be released rather than "Don't Forget to Dance", which had been suggested by the record company as the first single from State of Confusion. The UK branch of Arista Records approved this decision, releasing 7-inch and 12-inch versions of the new single on 19 November 1982 with "Noise" as the B-side (12-inch included extended versions of the songs). However, Clive Davis initially had reservations; Davies recalls that Davis "didn't want to put it [Come Dancing] out because it was too much of an English subject matter." Davis also thought it was just a "ditty" and did not have enough substance to be a single.

The US single of the song was finally released on 21 April 1983 after Davis was convinced by the success of the track's music video and the impressive US sales of import copies of the single. The track's promotional video became a staple of the fledgling MTV network, which gave the single sufficient momentum to enter the Billboard Hot 100 that May, ascending to the Top 40 in June 1983 and peaking at number six on 11 July. "Come Dancing" became the highest charting US single of the band's career, tying "Tired of Waiting for You" from 1965.

"Come Dancing" was re-released during July 1983 in Britain due to its immense popularity in America, thus delaying the UK release of follow-up "Don't Forget to Dance" in the process. The track entered the chart at 92 on 24 July, and crept to 65, 43 and 29, before peaking at number 12 on the UK singles chart on 27 August 1983. A Top of the Pops broadcast on 24 September 1983 featured videos of several current US hits including a lip-sync performance of "Come Dancing" by the band and a three-piece horn section, the Kinks' first appearance on the show since 1972. Of the appearance, Ray reflected, "We were vindicated, because we showed we were still making good records." On 27 October 1983, Ray was given the "One of the Most Played Songs of 1983" award by ASCAP for the song. "Don't Forget to Dance" was later released as a follow-up single, charting at number 29 in the United States.

Despite the success the single reached, it would be one of the Kinks' final hits in either Britain or America, ending the comeback the band had during the late 1970s and early 1980s. Ray said in 1996, "[I] wanted to quit in 1984, after 'Come Dancing.' I felt that that was the end of an era for the Kinks, and I wanted to stop the treadmill and step back and reappraise the whole thing, but we had another album to deliver. It seemed like we always had another album to deliver." Mick Avory left the band in 1984, a year after "Come Dancing" peaked in the USA. He later said, "I think leaving after a world wide hit with 'Come Dancing' was a good note to leave on."

Following its release, the song became a mainstay in the band's live set-list until the band's break-up. Live versions of the song appeared on both 1988's Live: The Road and the 1996 US double-album version of To the Bone. The studio version of the song has also appeared on multiple compilations, being used as the namesake for the 1986 greatest-hits package Come Dancing With the Kinks: The Best of the Kinks 1977–1986.

== Critical reception ==
"Come Dancing" has generally received positive reviews from music critics. In his review of State of Confusion, Rolling Stone critic Parke Puterbaugh said that the song "sums up the bittersweet mood that wafts through [State of Confusion] in calming counterpoint to its more turbulent moments". George Kalogerakis, also of Rolling Stone, said in his review of the album Live: The Road that the song was an "undeniable winner", and that "hearing [the song] in th[is] crackling live version is like running into [an] old friend".

Cash Box said that " while the story may have a touch of sadness, the upbeat presentation makes the song a more joyous experience." AllMusic writer Stephen Thomas Erlewine described the song as one of the "quieter moments" on State of Confusion where the album "came to life", praising its "buoyant nostalgia". On the band's Rolling Stone biography, the song was called "delightfully nostalgic". Author Rob Jovanovic called the song "incredibly catchy" and said that, as the song's title suggested, it "made [him] want to move his feet". Thomas M. Kitts praised its "big band sound" in his book, Ray Davies: Not Like Everybody Else.

== Music video ==
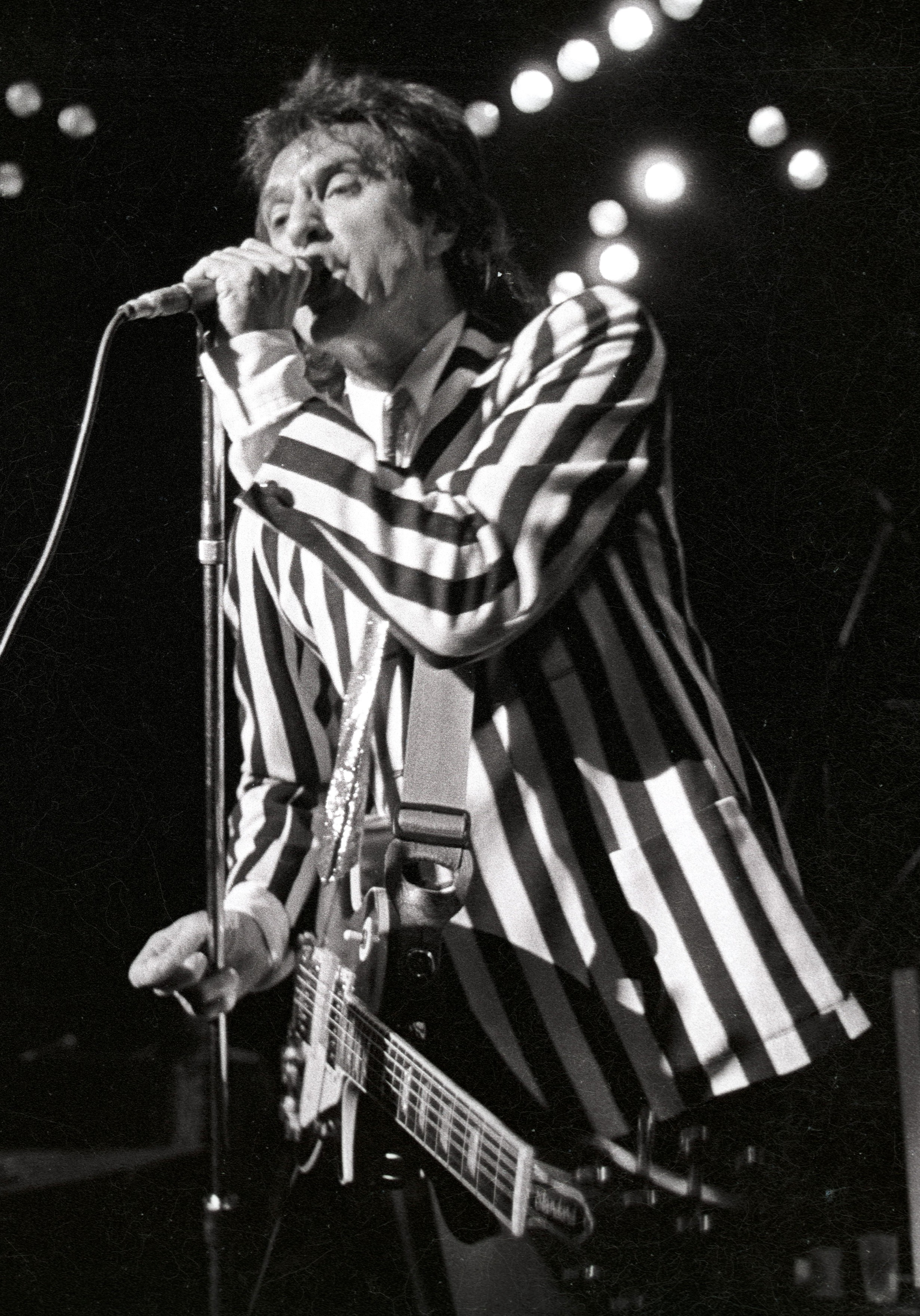
Ray Davies starred as the "spiv" in the music video for "Come Dancing".

The promotional music video for "Come Dancing" was shot in November 1982 at Ilford Palais in Essex. The video was produced by Michael Hamlyn and directed by Julien Temple, with choreography done by Jim Cameron. Dave Davies later said of Temple, "Julien was such a posey sod, walking around in a fur coat like he was Orson Welles, even though he was only doing a promo video." Local fans of the band appeared as the audience. The video was first broadcast in Britain in December 1982 on The Tube, a show on Channel 4, making its American debut on MTV on 25 March 1983.

In the video, the lyrics of "Come Dancing" are used as the storyline. Calling back to his youth, Ray starred as the "spiv" character who took the sister out to dance, and as his younger 13-year old self watching the two, circa the 1950s. Ray's character, according to author Johnny Rogan, was inspired by the Davies brothers' uncle, Frank Willmore, who Dave Davies described as "an old school kind of cockney." The members of the Kinks were featured as the band performing at the palais at the end of the video, with the older now catatonic spiv character solemnly watching the performance. Temple said of this scene, "I was standing behind [Martin] Scorsese at a bar, and he was going on about that shot, saying it was one of his favorites ever. There's a [Luis] Buñuel film, Simon of the Desert, where this guy who's been suffering on his pillar in the desert in BC whatever ends up in some weird club in Mexico City in '65. It's a bit like that. [Ray] did it beautifully, the fact he's so still and they're all heaving around him. I think Ray could have been more of an actor. He has a great, deep sense of film."

The band would revisit the spiv character Ray played in the video multiple times, such as in the music videos for "Don’t Forget to Dance" and "Do It Again". According to Ray, the band's 1986 album Think Visual was originally going to be a concept album centered on taking the character and putting him in the "environment of a video shop." Ilford Palais was demolished in 2007 to make room for luxury flats, meeting a similar fate to the palais described in the lyrics of "Come Dancing".

== Musical ==
"Come Dancing" served as the title number for a stage musical of the same name that Ray Davies had created. Set in a 1950s music hall, Come Dancing premiered at the Theatre Royal Stratford East on 13 September 2008. Ray Davies had written the original version of the play in 1997, although he had begun work on it since not long after he had written the original song. The final version of Come Dancing featured a book co-written by Davies and Paul Sirett and a score written by Davies that included three Kinks hits (including the title song) and a number of original songs. Davies also appeared as the narrator in the production, which ran until 25 October 2008. Come Dancing was to be revived by director Bill Kenwright in January 2010, but this, to Ray Davies's disappointment, was cancelled.

Come Dancing received mixed reviews from critics. The Daily Telegraph spoke positively of the production, calling it "a winning show that deserves a bright future." The Times, however, criticized it for lacking a story-line, saying it was "a ragged and sentimental montage of scenes sorely in need of narrative." Davies would later premiere another musical, Sunny Afternoon (named after the 1966 Kinks song of the same name), in 2014, which he had written in 2005 after finding out that Come Dancing would not be staged.

== Personnel ==
Personnel per Doug Hinman.

The Kinks

- Ray Davies – lead vocal, acoustic guitar
- Dave Davies – electric guitar, backing vocal
- Mick Avory – drums
- Jim Rodford – bass guitar, backing vocal
- Ian Gibbons – keyboard

Other musicians

- John Beecham – trombone
- Noel Morris – trumpet
- Andy Hamilton – tenor saxophone
- Alan Holmes – baritone saxophone
- Kate Williams – spoken voice

== Charts ==
=== Weekly charts ===
Chart (1982–1983)	Peak position
Australia (ARIA)	36
Belgium (Ultratop 50 Flanders)	18
Canada Top Singles (RPM)	6
Canada Adult Contemporary (RPM)	3
Ireland (IRMA)	4
Netherlands (Dutch Top 40)	25
Netherlands (Single Top 100)	29
Sweden (Sverigetopplistan)	18
Switzerland (Schweizer Hitparade)	13
UK Singles (Official Charts Company)	12
US Billboard Hot 100	6
US Mainstream Rock (Billboard)	17
US Cash Box Top 100	11

=== Year-end charts ===
Chart (1983)	Rank
Canada Top Singles (RPM)	38
US Billboard Hot 100	63
US Cash Box	77
