= Don't Forget to Dance =

1983 single by The Kinks

- US 7" 45 Cover

Single by The Kinks

from the album State of Confusion
- B-side: "Bernadette" (Ray Davies)
- Released: 1 August 1983 (US); 30 September 1983 (UK)
- Recorded: September/October 1982 at Grand Slam Studios, East Orange, New Jersey & Konk Studios, Hornsey, London
- Genre: Pop, soft rock
- Length: 4:39 (album version); 4:15 (single version); 5:09 (12" version)
- Label: Arista
- Songwriter: Ray Davies
- Producer: Ray Davies

The Kinks singles chronology
| "Come Dancing" (1982) | "Don't Forget to Dance" (1983) | "State of Confusion" (1983) |

Music video
- "Don't Forget to Dance" on YouTube

"Don't Forget to Dance" is a song performed by British rock group the Kinks, released as a single in 1983 and included on their album State of Confusion.

== Background and release ==
"Don't Forget to Dance" was initially recorded at Grand Slam Studios in New Jersey and Konk Studios in London in September and October 1982. Mixing and editing continued through late 1982 and into early 1983. Although the ballad was ultimately released as the follow-up single to "Come Dancing", also from State of Confusion, the Kinks' label, Arista Records, originally wanted to release it as the first single off the album. Ray Davies convinced Arista to release "Come Dancing" first and ultimately prevailed. "Don't Forget to Dance" was eventually released as a single in August 1983 in the US and the following month in the UK b/w "Bernadette". The 12" version of the single included extended versions of the songs.

Davies commented on the song, "Even a pompous love ballad like 'Don't Forget to Dance' had one of my favorite moments: a line, 'nice bit of old'. There's some nice writing in there".

== Reception ==
The song charted at No. 58 in the UK. In the US, it reached No. 29 on the Billboard Hot 100 (their last top 40 song on that chart), No. 16 on the Billboard Mainstream Rock chart, and No. 23 on the Billboard Adult Contemporary chart. It also reached No. 20 in Canada's The Record and No. 26 in RPM, and No. 38 in New Zealand.

Music critic Pete Bishop praised the song for its "beautiful melody and arrangement".

== Lyrics ==
The lyrics are bittersweet, as they are about observing a lonely middle age woman. Although the subject's friends have all "either married, vanished, or just left alone" and she has a "broken heart", the singer states that "I bet you danced a good one in your time/And if this were a party/I'd really make sure the next one would be mine." The chorus exhorts the woman "Don't forget to dance, no, no, no/Don't forget to smile." Allmusic described the song as "elegiac", and Johnny Rogan called it one of Davies' stronger melodies. Critic Don McLeese of the Chicago Sun Times noted that "'Don't Forget to Dance' is gracefully melodic in the 'Waterloo Sunset' tradition."

== Video ==
The video for "Don't Forget to Dance" was produced by Michael Hamlyn and directed by Julien Temple, who had the same roles for the prior "Come Dancing" video. The video was shot in July 1983 and was first aired in Germany on 1 August. The first airing in the US was on 3 September on MTV and the first airing in the UK was in November. The video repeats elements from the "Come Dancing" video, including the Kinks playing themselves on the ballroom stage and Ray Davies pursuing the girl. The video also includes a dream sequence based on the band's early days and including a costume ball in a mansion. The scenes of the band playing in the ballroom may have been inspired by a concert the Ray Davies Quartet performed at the Lyceum Ballroom on New Year's Eve 31 December 1962.

== Compilations ==
Since its initial release, "Don't Forget to Dance" has been included on a number of Kinks compilation albums, including Come Dancing with the Kinks, You Really Got Me: The Very Best of the Kinks, The Kinks Greatest: 1970-1986 and The Ultimate Collection.

== Cover version ==
In 1985, Austrian musician Sigi Maron covered "Don't Forget to Dance" with Viennese lyrics titled "Geh no net furt" on his album Unterm Regenbogen.
