= The Kinks =

English rock band (1962–1997)

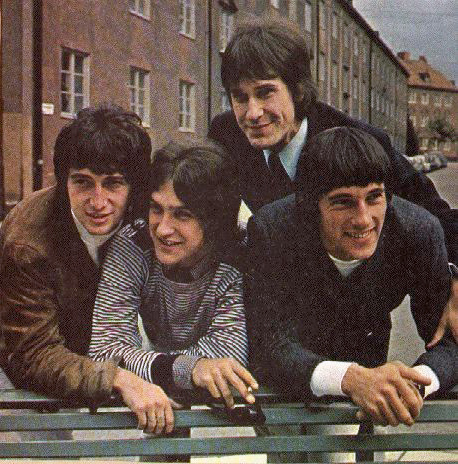
- Original line-up in 1965; From left: Pete Quaife, Dave Davies, Ray Davies, and Mick Avory

Background information
- Also known as: The Ray Davies Quartet (1962–1963); The Ramrods (1963); The Pete Quaife Band (1963); The Ravens (1963–1964); The Bo-Weevils (1964)
- Origin: London, England
- Genres: Rock; pop; R&B; proto-punk
- Years active: 1962–1997
- Labels: Pye; Cameo; Reprise; RCA; Arista; London; MCA; Columbia; Koch; Guardian; Universal
- Past members: Ray Davies; Dave Davies; Mick Avory; Pete Quaife; John Dalton; John Gosling; Andy Pyle; Gordon John Edwards; Jim Rodford; Ian Gibbons; Bob Henrit; Mark Haley
- Website: thekinks.info

The Kinks were an English rock band formed in London in 1962. The band's original line-up comprised brothers Ray (lead vocals, rhythm guitar) and Dave Davies (lead guitar, vocals), Pete Quaife (bass), and Mick Avory (drums, percussion). Emerging during the height of British rhythm and blues and Merseybeat, their breakthrough third single, the Ray Davies-penned "You Really Got Me" (1964), became an international hit, topping the charts in the United Kingdom and reaching the Top 10 in the United States. Other early hits included "All Day and All of the Night" (1964), "Tired of Waiting for You", "Set Me Free", "See My Friends", and "Till the End of the Day" (all 1965). They were part of the British Invasion of America until several problems during their 1965 American tour led to them being banned from touring there for several years.

The Kinks' music drew from a wide range of influences, including American R&B and rock and roll initially, and later adopting British music hall, folk, and country. Beginning with the late 1965 Kwyet Kinks EP, the band gained a reputation for reflecting English culture and lifestyle, fuelled by Ray Davies's observational and satirical lyricism, and made apparent in albums such as Face to Face (1966), Something Else by the Kinks (1967), The Kinks Are the Village Green Preservation Society (1968), Arthur (Or the Decline and Fall of the British Empire) (1969), Lola Versus Powerman and the Moneygoround, Part One (1970), and Muswell Hillbillies (1971), along with their hit singles during this period, including "Dedicated Follower of Fashion", "Sunny Afternoon", "Dead End Street" (all 1966), "Waterloo Sunset", "Autumn Almanac" (both 1967), "Days" (1968), and "Lola" (1970). After a fallow period in the mid-1970s, the band experienced a revival with their albums Sleepwalker (1977), Misfits (1978), Low Budget (1979), Give the People What They Want (1981), and State of Confusion (1983), the last of which produced one of the band's most successful US hits, "Come Dancing".

The Davies brothers remained with the band throughout its history. Quaife briefly left the band in 1966 and was replaced by John Dalton, though Quaife returned by the end of that year before leaving permanently in 1969, once again being replaced by Dalton. Keyboardist John Gosling was added in 1970, with this line-up remaining in place until 1976. After several changes during the late 1970s, the line-up stabilised in 1979 with the Davies brothers, Avory, bassist Jim Rodford, and keyboardist Ian Gibbons. Avory left in 1984, after which the band underwent a few more personnel changes before giving their last public performance in 1996 and breaking up in 1997 due to creative tension between the Davies brothers.

The Kinks are regarded as one of the most influential rock bands of the 1960s. They have had seventeen Top 20 singles and five Top 10 albums in the UK, and five of their singles reached the Top 10 on the US Billboard Hot 100 chart. Additionally, nine of their albums charted in the Top 40 of the US Billboard 200. Four Kinks albums have been certified Gold by the Recording Industry Association of America (RIAA), and the band has sold over 50 million records worldwide. Among numerous honours, they received the Ivor Novello Award for "Outstanding Service to British Music". In 1990, the original four members of the Kinks were inducted into the Rock and Roll Hall of Fame, as well as the UK Music Hall of Fame in 2005. Groups such as Van Halen, the Jam, the Knack, the Pretenders, Green Day, Queens of the Stone Age, and the Romantics have covered their songs, helping to boost the Kinks' record sales. In the 1990s, Britpop acts such as Blur and Oasis cited the band as a major influence.

== History ==
=== Formation (1962–1964) ===
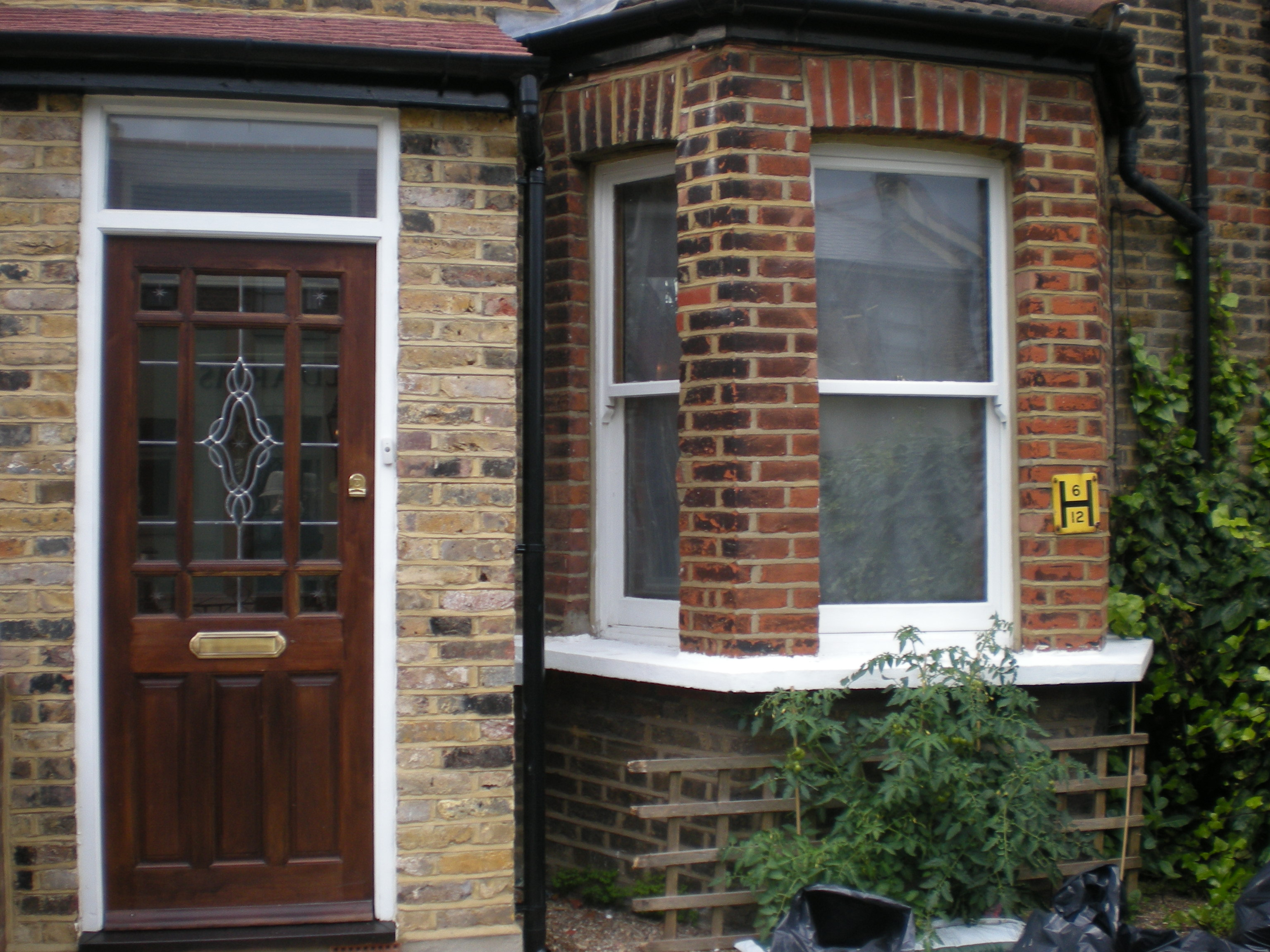
6 Denmark Terrace, the childhood home of the Davies brothers. The front room is where the family's frequent Saturday night parties were held.

The Davies brothers, Ray and Dave, were born in suburban North London on Huntingdon Road, East Finchley, the youngest and the only boys among their family's eight children. Their parents, Frederick and Annie Davies, moved the family to 6 Denmark Terrace, Fortis Green, in the neighbouring suburb of Muswell Hill. At home, the brothers were immersed in a world of varied musical styles, from the music hall of their parents' generation to the jazz and early rock and roll their older sisters enjoyed. Both Ray and his brother Dave, younger by almost three years, learnt to play guitar, and they played skiffle and rock and roll together.

The brothers attended William Grimshaw Secondary Modern School (later merged with Tollington Grammar School to become Fortismere School), where they formed a band, the Ray Davies Quartet, with Ray's friend and classmate Pete Quaife and Quaife's friend John Start (although they would also be known as the Pete Quaife Quartet if the bass player landed a gig for them instead). Their debut at a school dance was well received, which encouraged the group to play at local pubs and bars. The band went through a series of lead vocalists, including Rod Stewart, another student at William Grimshaw, who performed with the group at least once in early 1962. He then formed his own group, Rod Stewart and the Moonrakers, who became a local rival to the Ray Davies Quartet.

In late 1962, Ray Davies left home to study at Hornsey College of Art. He pursued interests in subjects such as film, sketching, theatre, and music, including jazz and blues. When Alexis Korner's Blues Incorporated played at the college in December, he asked advice from Alexis Korner, who recommended Giorgio Gomelsky, the future Yardbirds manager, who put Davies in touch with the Soho-based Dave Hunt Band, a professional group of musicians who played jazz and R&B. A few days after the Ray Davies Quartet supported Cyril Stapleton at the Lyceum Ballroom on New Year's Eve, Davies, while still remaining in the quartet, joined the Dave Hunt Band, which briefly included Charlie Watts on drums. In February 1963, Davies left Dave Hunt to join the Hamilton King Band (also known as the Blues Messengers), which had Peter Bardens as a pianist. At the end of the spring term, he left Hornsey College with a view to studying film at the Central School of Art and Design. Around this time, the Quartet changed their name to the Ramrods. Davies has referred to a show the fledgling Kinks played (again as the Ray Davies Quartet) at Hornsey Town Hall on Valentine's Day 1963 as their first important gig. In June, the Hamilton King Band broke up. However, the Ramrods kept going, performing under several other names, including the Pete Quaife Band and the Bo-Weevils, before (temporarily) settling on the Ravens. The fledgling group hired two managers, Grenville Collins and Robert Wace. In late 1963, former pop singer Larry Page became their third manager. American record producer Shel Talmy began working with the band, and the Beatles' promoter, Arthur Howes, was retained to schedule the Ravens' live shows. The group unsuccessfully auditioned for various record labels until early 1964, when Talmy secured them a contract with Pye Records. During this period, they had acquired a new drummer, Mickey Willet; however, Willet left the band shortly before they signed to Pye. The Ravens invited Mick Avory to replace him after seeing an advertisement Avory had placed in Melody Maker. Avory had a background in jazz drumming and had played one gig with the fledgling Rolling Stones.

Around this period, the Ravens decided on a new, permanent name: the Kinks. Numerous explanations of the name's genesis have been offered. In Jon Savage's analysis, they "needed a gimmick, some edge to get them attention. Here it was: 'Kinkiness'—something newsy, naughty but just on the borderline of acceptability. In adopting the 'Kinks' as their name at that time, they were participating in a time-honoured pop ritual—fame through outrage." Manager Robert Wace related his side of the story: "I had a friend [...] He thought the group was rather fun. If my memory is correct, he came up with the name just as an idea, as a good way of getting publicity [...] When we went to [the band members] with the name, they were [...] absolutely horrified. They said, 'We're not going to be called kinky!'" Ray Davies' account conflicts with Wace's—he recalled that the name was coined by Larry Page and referenced their "kinky" fashion sense. Davies quoted him as saying, "The way you look, and the clothes you wear, you ought to be called the Kinks." "I've never really liked the name", Ray stated.

=== Early years (1964–1966) ===
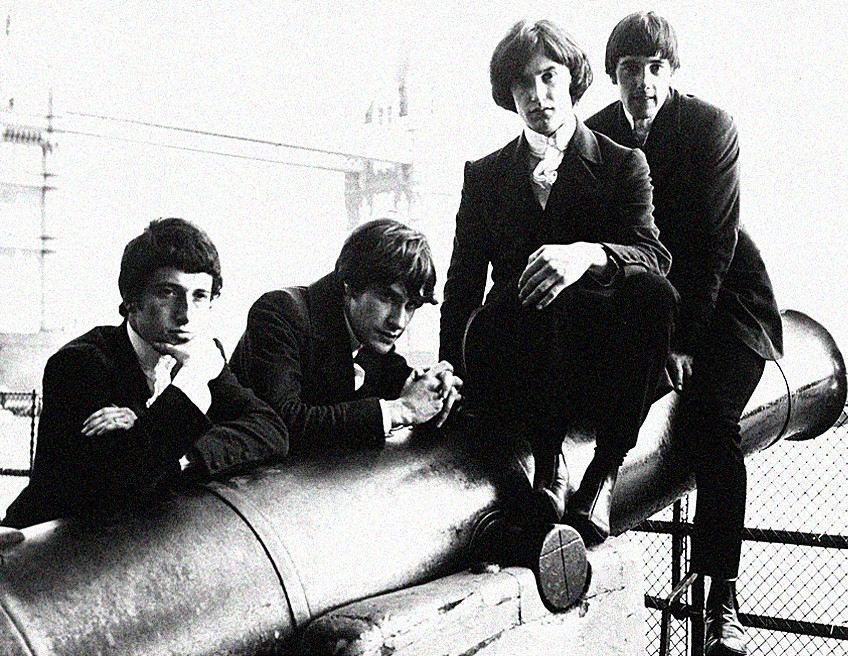
The Kinks in their red jackets, near Tower Bridge, London, August 1964

The Kinks' first single was a cover of the Little Richard song "Long Tall Sally". A friend of the band, Bobby Graham, was recruited to play the drums on the recording. Graham would continue to occasionally substitute for Avory in the studio, and he played on several of the Kinks' early singles, including the hits "You Really Got Me", "All Day and All of the Night" and "Tired of Waiting for You". Released in February 1964, "Long Tall Sally" was almost completely ignored, despite the publicity efforts of the band's managers. The group's second single, Ray Davies' original "You Still Want Me", was also passed over by the public.

"You Really Got Me"
"You Really Got Me" (1964) features a jagged, distorted guitar riff created by Dave Davies' cutting the speaker cone in an amplifier. The Kinks' first hit, it topped the British charts and reached number seven in the United States.

The Ray Davies song "You Really Got Me", influenced by American blues and the Kingsmen's version of "Louie Louie", was recorded on 15 June 1964 at Pye Studios with a slower and more produced feel than the final single. Davies, who hated the recording, feeling that the guitar was too buried and the echo too prominent, wanted to re-record the song, but Pye refused to fund another session; Davies was adamant, so Collins and Wace broke the stalemate by underwriting the session themselves. The band used an independent recording studio, IBC, and completed the recording in two takes on 15 July. The single was released in August 1964; supported by a performance on the television show Ready Steady Go! and extensive pirate radio coverage, it entered the UK charts on 15 August, reaching number one on 19 September. Hastily imported by the American label Reprise Records, where the band was signed by executive Mo Ostin, "You Really Got Me" also made the Top 10 in the United States.

The loud, distorted guitar riff and solo—played by Dave Davies and achieved by a slice he made in the speaker cone of his Elpico amplifier (referred to by the band as the "little green amp")—helped with the song's signature, gritty guitar sound. "You Really Got Me" has been described as "a blueprint song in the hard rock and heavy metal arsenal" and as an influence on the approach of some American garage rock bands. After its release, the Kinks recorded most of the tracks for their debut LP, simply titled Kinks. Consisting largely of covers and revamped traditional songs, it was released on 2 October 1964, reaching number four on the UK chart. "All Day and All of the Night", another Ray Davies hard rock tune, was released three weeks later as the group's fourth single, reaching number two in the UK and number seven in the US. The group's first EP, Kinksize Session, and their next three singles, "Tired of Waiting for You", "Ev'rybody's Gonna Be Happy", and "Set Me Free", were also commercially successful, with "Tired of Waiting for You" topping the UK singles chart.

The group opened 1965 with their first tour of Australia and New Zealand, with Manfred Mann and the Honeycombs. An intensive performing schedule saw them headline other package tours throughout the year with acts such as the Yardbirds and Mickey Finn. Tensions began to emerge within the band, expressed in incidents such as the on-stage fight between Avory and Dave Davies at the Capitol Theatre in Cardiff, Wales, on 19 May. After finishing the first song, "You Really Got Me", Davies insulted Avory and kicked over his drum set. Avory responded by hitting Davies with his hi-hat stand, rendering him unconscious, before fleeing from the scene, fearing that he had killed his bandmate. Davies was taken to Cardiff Royal Infirmary, where he received 16 stitches to his head. To placate the police, Avory later claimed that it was part of a new act in which the band members would hurl their instruments at one another.

Following a mid-year tour of the US, the American Federation of Musicians refused permits for the group to appear in concerts there for the next four years, effectively cutting them off from the main market for rock music at the height of the British Invasion. Although neither the Kinks nor the union revealed a specific reason for the ban, it was widely attributed to their rowdy on-stage behaviour at the time. It has been reported that the ban was sparked by an incident that happened when the band were taping Dick Clark's TV show Where the Action Is in 1965. Ray Davies recalls in his autobiography, "Some guy who said he worked for the TV company walked up and accused us of being late. Then he started making anti-British comments. Things like 'Just because the Beatles did it, every mop-topped, spotty-faced limey juvenile thinks he can come over here and make a career for himself.'". Subsequently, a punch was thrown, and the AFM banned them.

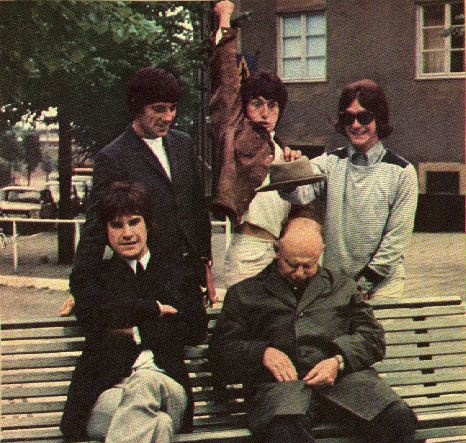
Publicity photo taken during a Swedish tour in 1965

A stopover in Bombay, India, during the band's Australian and Asian tour led to Davies writing the song "See My Friends", which was released as a single in July 1965. This was an early example of crossover music and one of the first pop songs of the period to display the direct influence of traditional music from the Indian subcontinent. Davies had written the song with a raga feel after hearing the early morning chants of local fishermen. Music historian Jonathan Bellman argues that the song was "extremely influential" on Ray Davies's musical peers: "And while much has been made of the Beatles' 'Norwegian Wood' because it was the first pop record to use a sitar, it was recorded well after the Kinks' clearly Indian 'See My Friends' was released." The Who's Pete Townshend was particularly affected by the song: "'See My Friends' was the next time I pricked up my ears and thought, 'God, he's done it again. He's invented something new.' That was the first reasonable use of the drone—far, far better than anything The Beatles did and far, far earlier. It was a European sound rather than an Eastern sound but with a strong, legitimate Eastern influence which had its roots in European folk music." In a widely quoted statement by Barry Fantoni, himself a 1960s celebrity and friend of the Kinks, the Beatles and the Who, he recalled that it was also an influence on the Beatles: "I remember it vividly and still think it's a remarkable pop song. I was with the Beatles the evening that they actually sat around listening to it on a gramophone, saying 'You know this guitar thing sounds like a sitar. We must get one of those.'" The song's radical departure from popular music conventions proved unpopular with the band's American following—it hit number 10 in the UK but stalled at number 111 in the US.

There were only a few bands that had this sorta really rough-sounding, what we used to call "R&B" style in the Sixties. There were the Yardbirds, there was us, there was the Pretty Things, as well.

— Dave Davies, interview with the Austin Chronicle

The day after the band's return from the Asian tour, recording began promptly on their next project, Kinda Kinks. The LP was completed and released within two weeks, even though 10 of its 12 songs were originals. According to Ray Davies, the band was not completely satisfied with the final cuts, but pressure from the record company meant that no time was available to correct flaws in the mix. Davies later expressed his dissatisfaction with the production, saying, "A bit more care should have been taken with it. I think [producer] Shel Talmy went too far in trying to keep in the rough edges. Some of the double tracking on that is appalling. It had better songs on it than the first album, but it wasn't executed in the right way. It was just far too rushed."

A significant stylistic shift in the Kinks' music became evident in late 1965/early 1966, with the appearance of songs like "A Well Respected Man" on the Kwyet Kinks EP and the single "Dedicated Follower of Fashion", as well as some tracks on the band's third album The Kink Kontroversy, on which Nicky Hopkins made his first appearance as a session musician with the group on keyboards. These recordings exemplified the development of Davies's songwriting style, from hard-driving rock numbers toward songs rich in social commentary, observation and idiosyncratic character study, all with a uniquely English flavour.

=== Critical success (1966–1972) ===
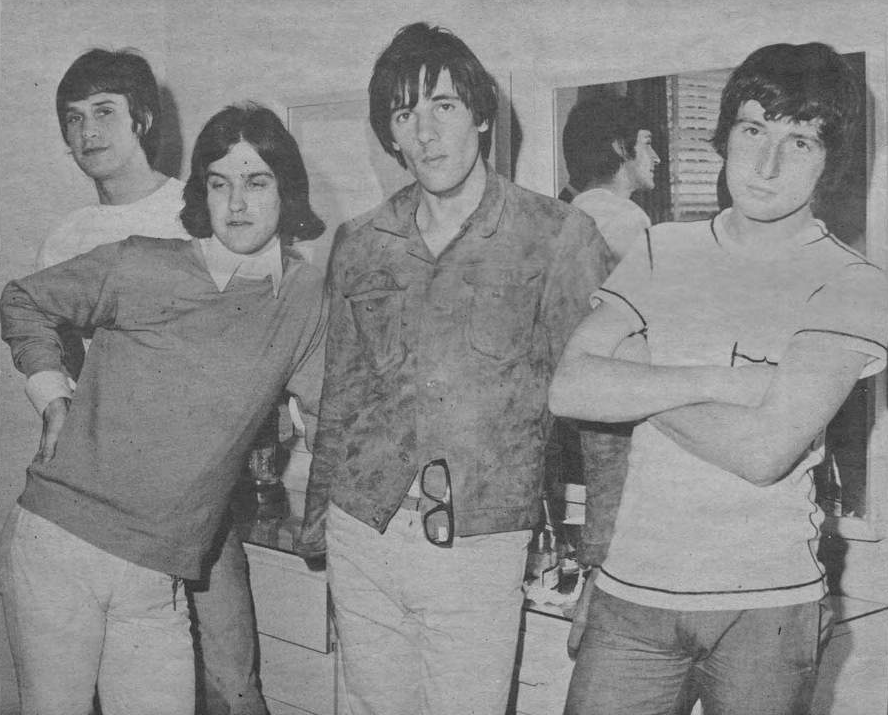
Promotional photograph taken in June 1965 during the band's first US tour

The satirical single "Sunny Afternoon" was the biggest UK hit of summer 1966, topping the charts and displacing the Beatles' "Paperback Writer". Before the release of The Kink Kontroversy, Ray Davies suffered a nervous and physical breakdown, caused by the pressures of touring, writing and ongoing legal squabbles. During his months of recuperation, he wrote several new songs and pondered the band's direction. In June 1966, Quaife was involved in an automobile accident, and after his recovery, he decided to leave the band. Bassist John Dalton, who was initially hired to fill in for the injured Quaife, subsequently became his official replacement. However, Quaife soon had a change of heart and rejoined the band in November 1966, with Dalton returning to his previous job as a coalman.

"Sunny Afternoon" was a dry run for the band's next album, Face to Face, which displayed Davies's growing ability to craft musically gentle yet lyrically cutting narrative songs about everyday life and people. Hopkins returned for the sessions to play various keyboard instruments, including piano and harpsichord. He played on the band's next two studio albums as well and was involved in a number of their live BBC recordings before joining the Jeff Beck Group in 1968. Face to Face was released in October 1966 in the UK, where it was well received and peaked at number eight. When it was released in the US in December, the album was tipped as a potential "chart winner" by Billboard magazine. Despite this, it managed only a meagre chart peak of 135, a sign of the band's flagging popularity in the American market.

Released in November 1966, the Kinks' next single was a social commentary piece entitled "Dead End Street". It became another UK Top 10 hit but reached only number 73 in the US. Bob Dawbarn from Melody Maker praised Ray Davies's ability to create a song with "some fabulous lyrics and a marvellous melody [...] combined with a great production", and music scholar Johnny Rogan described it as "a kitchen sink drama without the drama, a static vision of working-class stoicism". One of the group's first promotional music videos was produced for the song. It was filmed on Little Green Street, a small 18th-century lane in north London, located off Highgate Road in Kentish Town.

"Waterloo Sunset"
"Waterloo Sunset" (1967), one of the Kinks' most famous songs, was recorded very quickly. Backing vocals by Dave Davies, Pete Quaife and Ray's wife, Rasa, were laid down first, followed by Ray's lead vocal track. Dave Davies commented on the guitar effects: "We used a tape-delay echo [...] it sounded new because nobody had done it since the 1950s."

The Kinks' next single, "Waterloo Sunset", was released in May 1967. The lyrics describe two lovers passing over a bridge, with a melancholic observer reflecting on the couple, the Thames, and Waterloo station. The song was rumoured to have been inspired by the romance between actors Terence Stamp and Julie Christie. Ray Davies denied this in his autobiography and claimed in a 2008 interview, "It was a fantasy about my sister going off with her boyfriend to a new world and they were going to emigrate and go to another country." Despite its complex arrangement, the sessions for "Waterloo Sunset" lasted a mere ten hours. Dave Davies later commented on the recording: "We spent a lot of time trying to get a different guitar sound, to get a more unique feel for the record. In the end, we used a tape-delay echo, but it sounded new because nobody had done it since the 1950s. I remember Steve Marriott of the Small Faces came up and asked me how we'd got that sound. We were almost trendy for a while." The single was one of the Kinks' biggest UK successes, hitting number two on Melody Maker's chart, and became one of their most popular and best-known songs. Critic Robert Christgau called it "the most beautiful song in the English language", and AllMusic senior editor Stephen Thomas Erlewine cited it as "possibly the most beautiful song of the rock and roll era". In August 1967, the Kinks' first live album, The Live Kinks, was issued in the US, though it would not appear in the UK until the next year under the title Live at Kelvin Hall.

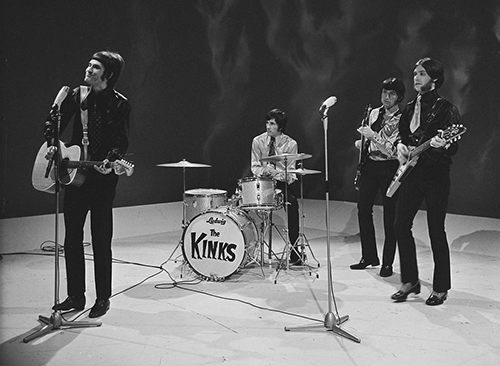
Ray Davies playing a Fender acoustic and Dave Davies a prototype Gibson Flying V on the Dutch TV programme Fenklup, 29 April 1967

The songs on the 1967 album, Something Else by the Kinks, developed the musical progressions of Face to Face, adding English music hall influences to the band's sound. Dave Davies scored a major UK chart success with the album's "Death of a Clown". While co-written by Ray Davies and recorded by the Kinks, the song was also released as a Dave Davies solo single. Overall, the album's commercial performance was disappointing, prompting the Kinks to rush out a new single, "Autumn Almanac", in early October. Backed with "Mister Pleasant", the single became another top-5 success for the group. At this point, in a string of 13 singles, 12 of them reached the top 10 in the UK chart. Andy Miller suggests that, despite its success, the single marks a turning point in the band's career—it would be their last entry into the UK top ten for three years: "In retrospect, 'Autumn Almanac' marked the first hint of trouble for the Kinks. This glorious single, one of the greatest achievements of British 60s pop, was widely criticised at the time for being too similar to previous [Ray] Davies efforts." Nick Jones of Melody Maker asked, "Is it time that Ray stopped writing about grey suburbanites going about their fairly unemotional daily business? [...] Ray works to a formula, not a feeling, and it's becoming rather boring." Disc jockey Mike Ahern called the song "a load of old rubbish". Dave's second solo single, "Susannah's Still Alive", was released in the UK on 24 November. It sold 59,000 copies, failing to reach the top 10. Miller states that "by the end of the year, the Kinks were rapidly sliding out of fashion".

Everyone was panicking because "Wonderboy" wasn't sounding like a hit record. Among the management and the agent, Danny Detesh, there was definitely a sense that the band wouldn't go on for much longer [...] Danny came backstage when the record flopped and said, "Well, you've had a good run. You've enjoyed it." As if it was all over for us.

— Ray Davies, on the decline of the band's 1960s incarnation, "Wonderboy", and cabaret touring

Beginning early in 1968, the group largely retired from touring, instead focusing on studio work. As the band was not available to promote their material, subsequent releases met with little success. The Kinks' next single, "Wonderboy", released in the spring of 1968, stalled at number 36 and became the band's first single not to make the UK top 20 since their early covers. In the face of the band's declining popularity, Davies continued to pursue his personal songwriting style while rebelling against the heavy demands placed on him to keep producing commercial hits, and the group continued to devote time to the studio, centring on a slowly developing project of Ray's called Village Green. In an attempt to revive the group's commercial standing, the Kinks' management booked them on a month-long package tour for April, drawing the group away from the studio. The venues were largely cabarets and clubs; headlining was Peter Frampton's group, the Herd. "In general, the teenyboppers were not there to see the boring old Kinks, who occasionally had to endure chants of 'We Want The Herd!' during their brief appearances", commented Andy Miller. The tour proved taxing and stressful—Pete Quaife recalled, "It was a chore, very dull, boring and straightforward [...] We only did twenty minutes, but it used to drive me absolutely frantic, standing on stage and playing three notes over and over again." At the end of June, the Kinks released the single "Days", which provided a minor, but only momentary, comeback for the group. "I remember playing it when I was at Fortis Green the first time I had a tape of it", Ray said. "I played it to Brian, who used to be our roadie, and his wife and two daughters. They were crying at the end of it. Really wonderful—like going to Waterloo and seeing the sunset. [...] It's like saying goodbye to somebody, then afterwards feeling the fear that you actually are alone." "Days" reached number 12 in the UK and was a top-20 hit in several other countries, but it did not chart in the US.

Village Green eventually morphed into their next album, The Kinks Are the Village Green Preservation Society, released in late 1968 in the UK. A collection of thematic vignettes of English town and hamlet life, it was assembled from songs written and recorded over the previous two years. It was greeted with almost unanimously positive reviews from both UK and US rock critics, yet failed to attract strong sales. One factor in the album's initial commercial failure was the lack of a popular single; it did not include the moderately successful "Days", and the album track "Starstruck" was released as a single in North America and continental Europe but was unsuccessful. Although a commercial disappointment, Village Green (the project's original name was adopted as a shorthand for the long album title) was embraced by the new underground rock press when it was released in January 1969 in the US, where the Kinks began to acquire a reputation as a cult band. In The Village Voice, a newly hired Robert Christgau called it "the best album of the year so far". The underground Boston paper Fusion published a review stating, "the Kinks continue, despite the odds, the bad press and their demonstrated lot, to come across. [...] Their persistence is dignified; their virtues are stoic. The Kinks are forever, only for now in modern dress." The record did not escape criticism, however. In the student paper California Tech, one writer commented that it was "schmaltz rock [...] without imagination, poorly arranged and a poor copy of The Beatles". Although Davies later estimated that it had sold only around 100,000 copies worldwide on its initial release, Village Green has since become the Kinks' best-selling original record. The album remains popular; in 2004, it was re-released in a 3CD "Deluxe" edition, and the track "Picture Book" was featured in a popular Hewlett-Packard television commercial, helping considerably to boost the album's popularity.

In early 1969, Quaife again announced that he was leaving the band. The other members did not take his statement seriously until an article appeared in New Musical Express on 4 April featuring Quaife's new band, Maple Oak, which he had formed without telling the rest of the Kinks. Ray Davies pleaded with him to return for the sessions for their upcoming album, but Quaife refused. His last recording with the Kinks was the non-album single "Plastic Man" and its B-side "King Kong", released in March 1969. Immediately after Quaife had confirmed he was not returning, Ray Davies called up John Dalton, who had replaced Quaife three years prior, and asked him to rejoin. Dalton remained with the group until the recording of the album Sleepwalker in 1976.

Ray Davies travelled to Los Angeles in April 1969 to help negotiate an end to the American Federation of Musicians' ban on the group, opening up an opportunity for them to return to touring in the US. The group's management quickly made plans for a North American tour to help restore their standing in the US pop music scene. Before their return to the US, the Kinks recorded another album, Arthur (Or the Decline and Fall of the British Empire). As with the previous two albums, Arthur was grounded in characteristically English lyrical and musical hooks. A modest commercial success, it was well received by American music critics. Conceived as the score for a proposed but unrealised television drama, much of the album revolved around themes from the Davies brothers' childhood; their sister Rosie, who had migrated to Australia in the early 1960s with her husband Arthur Anning, the album's namesake; and life growing up during the Second World War. The Kinks embarked on their tour of the US in October 1969. The tour was generally unsuccessful, as the group struggled to find cooperative promoters and interested audiences; many of the scheduled concert dates were cancelled. The band did, however, manage to play a few major venues, such as the Fillmore East and Whisky a Go Go.

"Lola"
Ray Davies created the "clang" at the beginning of "Lola" (1970) by combining the sounds of a resonator and a Martin guitar.

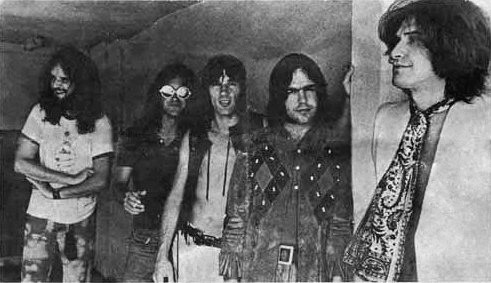
The Kinks, c. 1971. From left: John Gosling, Dave Davies, Mick Avory, John Dalton, and Ray Davies (the band's line-up from 1970 to 1976).

The band added keyboardist John Gosling to their line-up in early 1970; before which, Nicky Hopkins and Ray Davies had done most of the session work on keyboards. In May 1970, Gosling debuted with the Kinks on "Lola", an account of a confused romantic encounter with a transvestite, which became both a UK and a US top-10 hit, helping return the Kinks to the public eye. The lyrics originally contained the word "Coca-Cola", and the BBC refused to broadcast the song, considering it to be in violation of their policy against product placement. Part of the song was hastily re-recorded by Ray Davies, with the offending line changed to the generic "cherry cola", although in concert the Kinks still used "Coca-Cola". Recordings of both versions of "Lola" exist. Released in November 1970, the accompanying album Lola Versus Powerman and the Moneygoround, Part One was a critical and commercial success, charting in the top 40 in the US, making it their most successful album since the mid-1960s. After the success of "Lola", the band released Percy in 1971, a soundtrack album to a film of the same name about a penis transplant. The album, which consisted largely of instrumentals, did not receive positive reviews. The band's US label, Reprise, declined to release it in the US, precipitating a major dispute that contributed to the band's departure from the label. Directly after the release of the album, the band's contracts with Pye and Reprise expired.

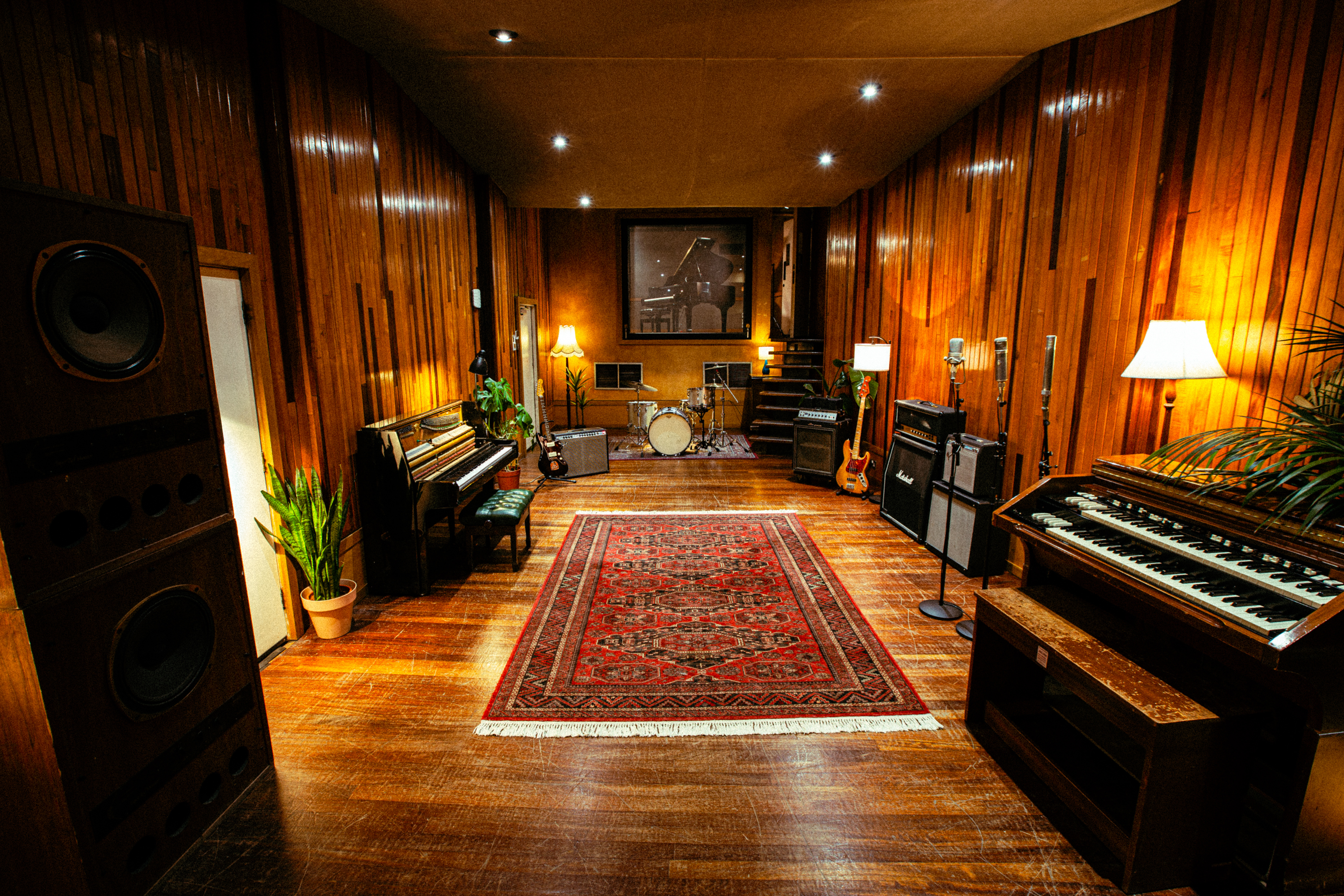
A picture of Konk Studios Live Room in Studio 1

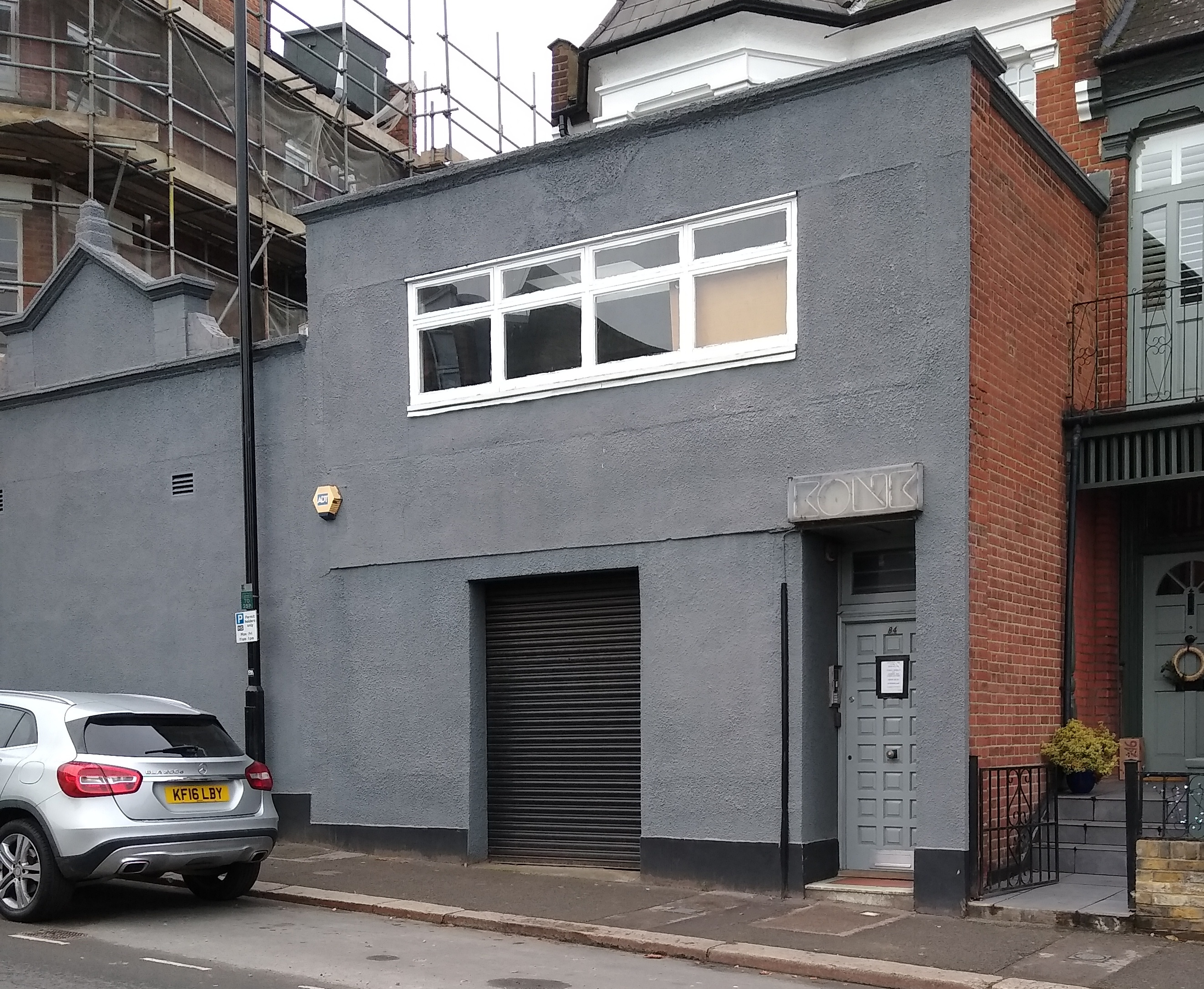
Front entrance of Konk Studios at 84–86 Tottenham Lane, London

Before the end of 1971, the Kinks signed a five-album deal with RCA Records and received a million-dollar advance, which helped fund the construction of their own recording studio, Konk. Their debut for RCA, Muswell Hillbillies, was replete with the influence of music hall and traditional American musical styles, including country and bluegrass. Though not as successful as its predecessors, it is often hailed as their last great record. It was named after Muswell Hill, where Ray and Dave grew up, and contained songs focusing on working-class life and, again, the Davies brothers' childhood. Despite positive reviews and high expectations, Muswell Hillbillies peaked at number 48 on the Record World chart and number 100 on the Billboard chart. It was followed in 1972 by a double album, Everybody's in Show-Biz, consisting of both studio tracks and live numbers recorded during a two-night stand at Carnegie Hall. The record featured the ballad "Celluloid Heroes" and the Caribbean-themed "Supersonic Rocket Ship", their last UK top-20 hit for more than a decade. "Celluloid Heroes" is a bittersweet rumination on dead and fading Hollywood stars (Mickey Rooney was still alive), in which the narrator declares that he wishes his life were like a movie "because celluloid heroes never feel any pain [...] and celluloid heroes never really die." The album was moderately successful in the US, peaking at number 47 in Record World and number 70 in Billboard. It marks the transition between the band's early 1970s rock material and the theatrical incarnation in which they immersed themselves for the next four years.

=== Theatrical incarnation (1973–1975) ===
In 1973, Ray Davies dived headlong into the theatrical style, beginning with the rock opera Preservation, a sprawling chronicle of social revolution and a more ambitious outgrowth of the earlier Village Green Preservation Society ethos. In conjunction with the Preservation project, the Kinks' line-up was expanded to include a horn section and female backup singers, essentially reconfiguring the group as a theatrical troupe.

Ray Davies's marital problems during this period began to affect the band adversely, particularly after his wife, Rasa, took their children and left him in June 1973. Davies became depressed; during a July gig at White City Stadium, he told the audience he was " sick of the whole thing" and was retiring. He subsequently collapsed after a drug overdose and was taken to hospital. With Ray Davies in a seemingly critical condition, plans were discussed for Dave to continue as frontman in a worst-case scenario. Ray recovered from his illness as well as his depression, but throughout the remainder of the Kinks' theatrical incarnation, the band's output remained uneven, and their already fading popularity declined even more. John Dalton later commented that when Davies "decided to work again [...] I don't think he was totally better, and he's been a different person ever since."

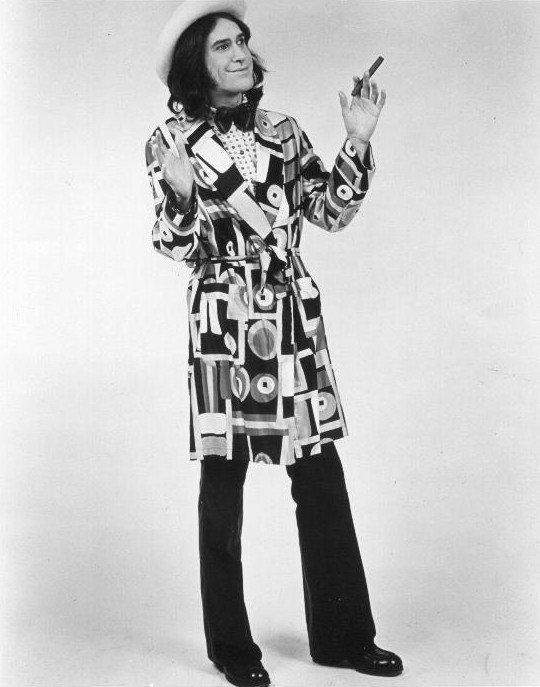
Ray Davies in character as Mr Flash, the anti-hero of the Preservation series

Preservation Act 1 (1973) and Preservation Act 2 (1974) received generally poor reviews. The story on the albums involved an anti-hero called Mr Flash and his rival and enemy, Mr Black (played by Dave Davies during live shows), an ultra-purist and corporatist. Preservation Act 2 was the first album recorded at Konk Studio; from this point forward, virtually every Kinks studio recording was produced by Ray Davies at Konk. The band embarked on an ambitious US tour throughout late 1974, adapting the Preservation story for the stage. Author Robert Polito: "[Ray] Davies expanded the Kinks into a road troupe of perhaps a dozen costumed actors, singers and horn players. [...] Smoother and tighter than on record, Preservation live proved funnier as well."

"Mirror Of Love"
"Mirror Of Love" (1974), incorporating aspects of Dixieland and New Orleans jazz, is typical of the Kinks' theatrical period.

Davies began another project for Granada Television, a musical called Starmaker. After a broadcast with Ray Davies in the starring role and the Kinks as both backup band and ancillary characters, the project eventually morphed into the concept album The Kinks Present a Soap Opera, released in May 1975, in which Ray Davies fantasised about what would happen if a rock star traded places with a "normal Norman" and took a 9–5 job. In August 1975, the Kinks recorded their final theatrical work, Schoolboys in Disgrace, a backstory biography of Preservation's Mr Flash. The record was a modest success, peaking at number 45 on the Billboard charts.

=== Return to commercial success (1976–1985) ===
Following the termination of their contract with RCA, the Kinks signed with Arista Records in 1976. With the encouragement of Arista's management, they stripped back down to a five-man core group and were reborn as an arena rock band. John Dalton left the band before finishing the sessions for the debut Arista album. Andy Pyle was brought in to complete the sessions and to play on the subsequent tour. Sleepwalker, released in 1977, marked a return to success for the group as it peaked at number 21 on the Billboard chart. After its release and the recording of the follow-up, Misfits, Andy Pyle and keyboardist John Gosling left the group to work together on a separate project. In May 1978, Misfits, the Kinks' second Arista album, was released. It included the US top-40 hit "A Rock 'n' Roll Fantasy", which helped make the record another success for the band. The non-album single "Father Christmas" has remained a popular track; driven by session drummer Henry Spinetti's drumming and Dave Davies' heavy guitar, it has become a classic seasonal favourite on mainstream radio. For the following tour, the band recruited ex-Argent bassist Jim Rodford and ex-Pretty Things keyboardist Gordon John Edwards. Edwards soon left, and the band recorded Low Budget (1979) as a quartet. Keyboardist Ian Gibbons was recruited for the subsequent tour.

Beginning in the late 1970s, bands such as the Jam ("David Watts"), the Pretenders ("Stop Your Sobbing", "I Go to Sleep"), the Romantics ("She's Got Everything"), and the Knack ("The Hard Way") recorded covers of Kinks songs, which helped bring attention to the group's new releases. In 1978, Van Halen covered "You Really Got Me" for their debut single, a top-40 US hit, boosting the Kinks' comeback. They later covered "Where Have All the Good Times Gone", another early Kinks song which had been covered by David Bowie on his 1973 album Pin Ups. The hard rock sound of Low Budget, released in 1979, helped make it the Kinks' second gold album and highest-charting original album in the US, where it peaked at number 11. The live album One for the Road was produced in 1980 along with a video of the same title, bringing the group's concert-drawing power to a peak that would last into 1983. Dave Davies also took advantage of the group's improved commercial standing to fulfil his decade-long ambitions to release albums of his solo work. The first was the eponymous Dave Davies in 1980. It was also known by its catalogue number AFL1-3603 because of its cover art, which depicted Dave Davies as a leather-jacketed piece of price-scanning barcode. He produced another, less successful, solo album in 1981, Glamour.

"Come Dancing"
"Come Dancing" (1982), the Kinks' last major hit single, incorporated nostalgic music hall and big band styles. The song reached number six in the US and number 12 in the UK.

Give the People What They Want was released in late 1981 and reached number 15 in the US. The record attained gold status and featured the UK hit single "Better Things" as well as "Destroyer", a major Mainstream Rock hit. To promote the album, the Kinks spent the end of 1981 and most of 1982 touring relentlessly and played multiple sell-out concerts throughout Australia, Japan, England and the US. The tour culminated with a performance at the US Festival in San Bernardino, California, for a crowd of 205,000. In spring 1983, "Come Dancing" became their biggest American hit since "Tired of Waiting for You", peaking at number six. It also became the group's first top-20 hit in the UK since 1972, peaking at number 12. The accompanying album, State of Confusion, was another commercial success, reaching number 12 in the US, but, like all the group's albums since 1967, it failed to chart in the UK. Another single released from the record, "Don't Forget to Dance", became a US top-30 hit and a minor UK chart entry.

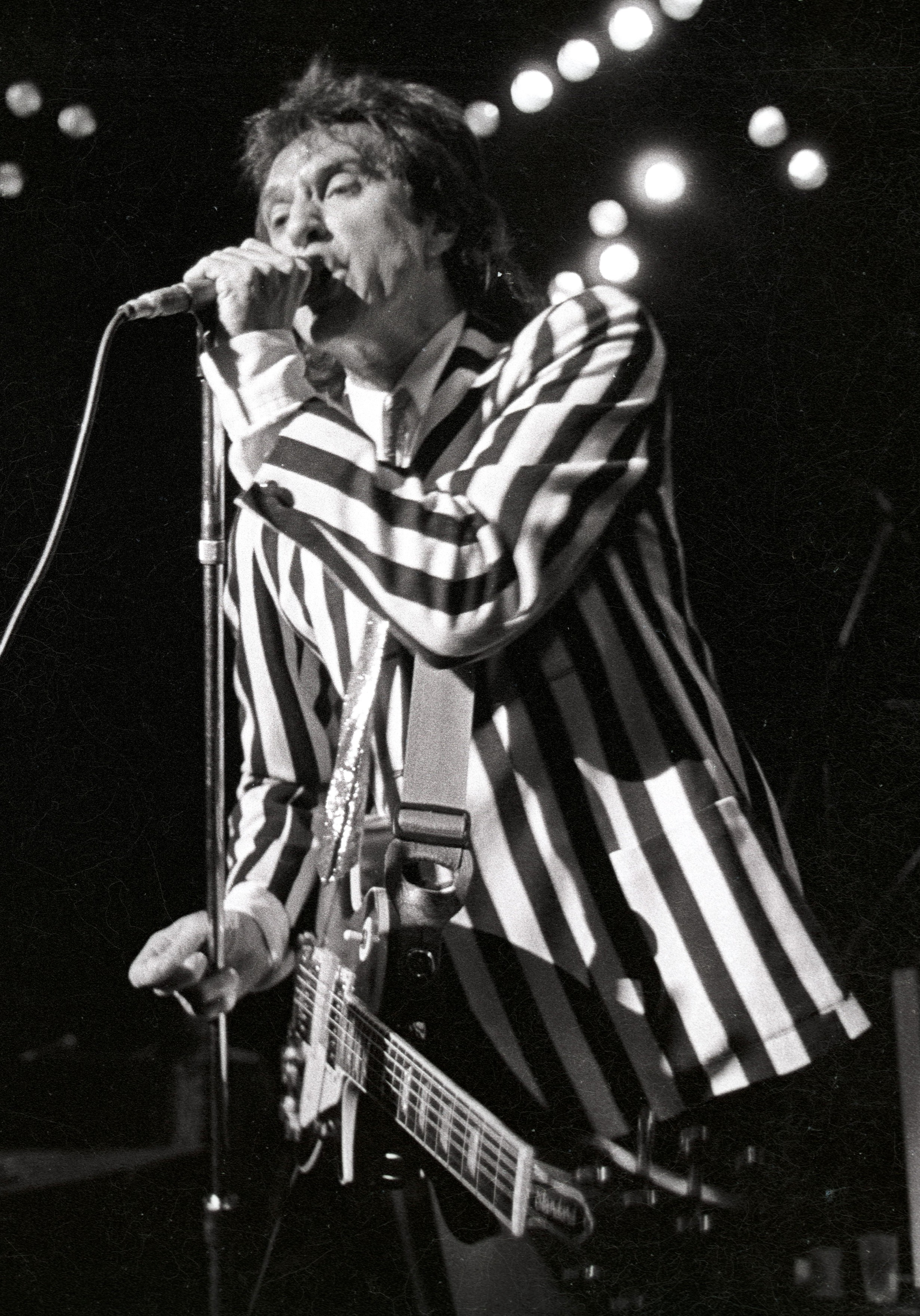
Ray Davies in Brussels, 1985, as the group's popularity began to dwindle

The Kinks' second wave of popularity remained at a peak with State of Confusion, but that success began to fade, a trend that also affected their contemporaries the Rolling Stones and the Who. During the second half of 1983, Ray Davies started work on an ambitious solo film project, Return to Waterloo, about a London commuter who daydreams that he is a serial murderer. The film gave Tim Roth a significant early role. Davies's commitment to writing, directing, and scoring the new work caused tension in his relationship with his brother. Another problem was the stormy end of the relationship between Ray Davies and Chrissie Hynde. The old feud between Dave Davies and drummer Mick Avory also re-ignited. Davies eventually refused to work with Avory and called for him to be replaced by Bob Henrit, former drummer of Argent (of which Jim Rodford had also been a member). Avory left the band, and Henrit was brought in to take his place. Ray Davies, who was still on amiable terms with Avory, invited him to manage Konk Studios. Avory accepted and continued to serve as a producer and occasional contributor on later Kinks albums.

Between the completion of Return to Waterloo and Avory's departure, the band had begun work on Word of Mouth, their final Arista album, released in November 1984. As a result, it includes Avory on three tracks, with Henrit and a drum machine on the rest. Many of the songs also appeared as solo recordings on Ray Davies' Return to Waterloo soundtrack album. Word of Mouth's lead track, "Do It Again", was released as a single in April 1985. It reached number 41 in the US, the band's last entry into the Billboard Hot 100. Coinciding with the album's release, the first three books on the Kinks were published: The Kinks: The Official Biography, by Jon Savage; The Kinks Kronikles, by rock critic John Mendelsohn, who had overseen the 1972 The Kink Kronikles compilation album; and The Kinks – The Sound and the Fury (The Kinks – A Mental Institution in the US), by Johnny Rogan.

=== Decline in popularity and split (1986–1997) ===
In early 1986, the Kinks signed with MCA Records in the US and London Records in the UK. Their first album for the new labels, Think Visual, was released later that year with moderate success, peaking at number 81 on the Billboard albums chart. Songs like the ballad "Lost and Found" and "Working at the Factory" concerned blue-collar life on an assembly line, while the title track was an attack on the very MTV video culture from which the band had profited earlier in the decade. Think Visual was followed in 1987 with The Road, which was a mediocre commercial and critical performer. In 1989, the Kinks released UK Jive, a commercial failure that made only a momentary entry into the US album chart at number 122. MCA Records ultimately dropped them, leaving the Kinks without a label deal for the first time in over 25 years. Long-time keyboardist Ian Gibbons left the group and was replaced by Mark Haley.

The Kinks were inducted into the Rock and Roll Hall of Fame in 1990, their first year of eligibility. Mick Avory and Pete Quaife were present for the award. The induction did not lead to a revival of the group's stalled career. A compilation from the MCA Records period, Lost & Found (1986–1989), was released in 1991 to fulfil contractual obligations, marking the official end of the group's relationship with the label.

The Kinks then signed with Columbia Records and released the five-song EP Did Ya in 1991, the title track of which charted at number 48 on the US Mainstream Rock chart. The Kinks reverted to a four-piece band for the recording of their first Columbia album, Phobia, in 1993. After a sellout performance at the Royal Albert Hall in London, Mark Haley departed the band, and Gibbons rejoined them for a US tour. Phobia managed only one week in the US Billboard chart at number 166; as had by then become usual for the band, it made no impression in the UK. The single "Only a Dream" narrowly failed to reach the British chart. The album's final candidate for release as a single, "Scattered", was announced and followed up with TV and radio promotion. However, the record was unavailable in stores—several months later, a small number appeared on the collector market. The group was dropped by Columbia in 1994.

The band continued without the support of the major record label and released the first version of the album To the Bone on their own Konk label in the UK in 1994. This live acoustic album was partly recorded on the highly successful UK tours of 1993 and 1994 and partly in the Konk studio in front of a small, invited audience. Two years later, the band released a new, improved, live double-CD set in the US, which retained the same name and contained two new studio tracks, "Animal" and "To the Bone". The CD set also featured new treatments of many old Kinks hits. The record drew respectable press but failed to chart in either the US or the UK.

The band's profile rose considerably in the mid-1990s, primarily as a result of the "Britpop" boom. Several of the most prominent bands of the decade cited the Kinks as a major influence. Despite this recognition, the group's commercial viability continued to decline. They gradually became less active, leading Ray and Dave Davies to pursue their own interests. Each released an autobiography; Ray's X-Ray: The Unauthorized Autobiography was published in early 1995, and Dave responded with his memoir Kink, published a year later. The Kinks gave their last public performance in mid-1996, and the group assembled for what turned out to be their last time together at a party for Dave's 50th birthday. Kinks chronicler and historian Doug Hinman stated, "The symbolism of the event was impossible to overlook. The party was held at the site of the brothers' very first musical endeavour, the Clissold Arms pub, across the street from their childhood home on Fortis Green in North London."

=== Solo work and recognition (1998–2017) ===
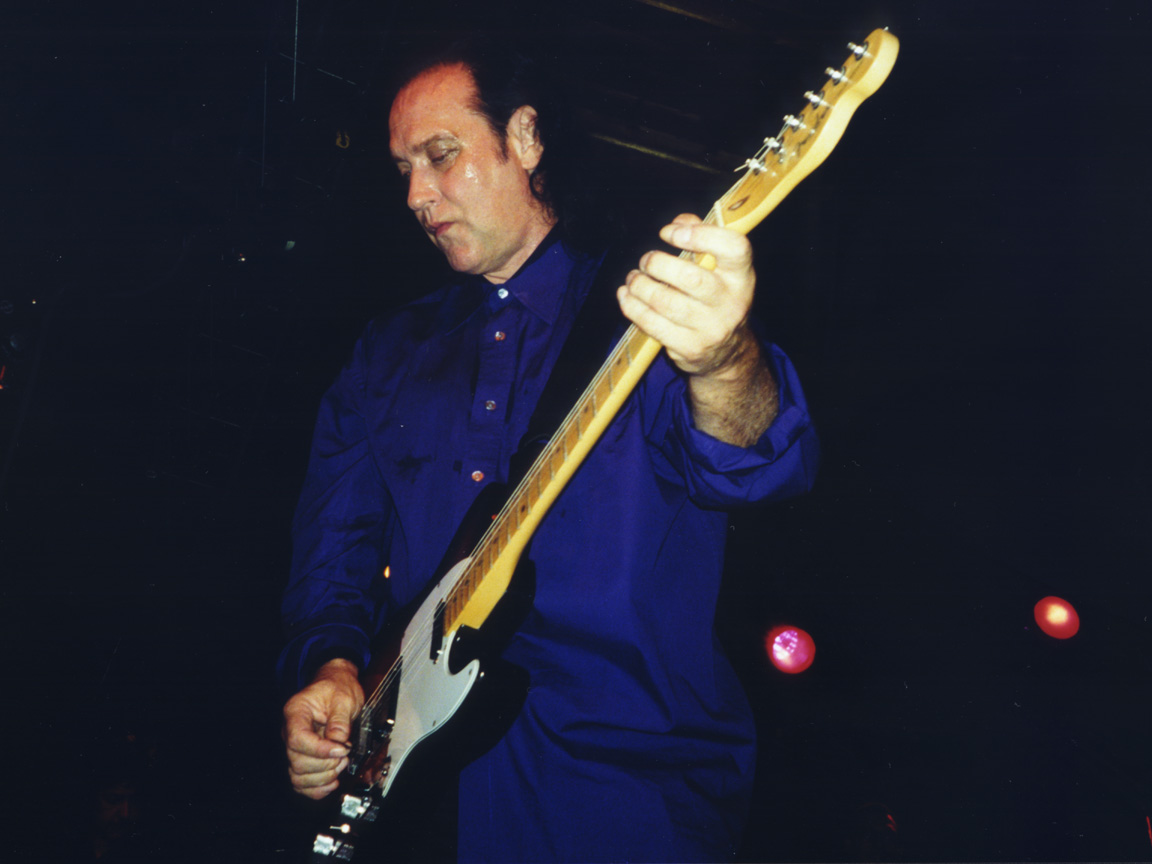
Dave Davies at the Dakota Creek Roadhouse, 2002

The band members subsequently focused on solo projects, and the Davies brothers both released their own studio albums. Talk of a Kinks reunion circulated (including an aborted studio reunion of the original band members in 1999), but neither Ray nor Dave Davies showed much interest in playing together again. Meanwhile, former members John Gosling, John Dalton and Mick Avory had regrouped in 1994 and started performing on the oldies circuit along with Dave Clarke as the Kast Off Kinks.

In 1998, Ray Davies released the solo album The Storyteller as a companion piece to X-Ray. Originally written two years earlier as a cabaret-style show, the album celebrated his old band and estranged brother. Seeing the programming potential of his music/dialogue/reminiscence format, the American music television network VH1 launched VH1 Storytellers. Dave Davies spoke favourably of a Kinks reunion in early 2003. As the 40th anniversary of the group's breakthrough neared, both the Davies brothers expressed interest in working together again. However, hopes for a reunion were dashed in June 2004 when Dave suffered a stroke that temporarily impaired his ability to speak and play guitar. Following his recovery, the Kinks were inducted into the UK Music Hall of Fame in November 2005, with all four of the original band members in attendance. The induction helped fuel sales for the group; in August 2007, a re-entry of The Ultimate Collection, a compilation of material spanning the band's career, reached number 32 on the UK Top 100 album chart and number one on the UK Indie album chart. Quaife, who had been receiving kidney dialysis for more than ten years, died on 23 June 2010, aged 66. On 20 January 2018, long-time bassist Jim Rodford died at the age of 76. Keyboardist Ian Gibbons died of cancer on 1 August 2019. aged 67. Gosling died on 4 August 2023, at the age of 75.

=== Aborted reunion (2018–present) ===
In June 2018, the Davies brothers said they were working on a new Kinks studio album with Avory. In July 2019, the band again said they were working on new music. However, in a December 2020 interview with The New York Times, Ray Davies gave no indication that much, or indeed any, work had been done, saying, "I'd like to work with Dave again—if he'll work with me." When asked about a reunion in an interview published in January 2021, Dave Davies said, "We've been talking about it. I mean there's a lot of material and, you know, it could still happen."

In March 2023, Avory laid to rest rumours of a reunion, citing differences between the Davies brothers: "I don't think it's possible now – one thing, health-wise. And I don't think we could ever work it out because Dave wanted to do it one way, and Ray wanted to do it the other – which was quite normal thinking for them. [...] Ray thought [of] doing it as an 'evolution tour' – you have different people who came into the band and what songs they recorded on and what songs affected them. I thought that would be more interesting. But I think Dave just wanted 'a band' – not particularly with me in it. Just reform something like they had when I left – just a band with him and Ray in it, really."

== Live performances ==
The first live performance of the Ray Davies Quartet, the band that would become the Kinks, was at a dance for their school, William Grimshaw, in 1962. The band performed under several names between 1962 and 1963—the Pete Quaife Band, the Bo-Weevils, the Ramrods, and the Ravens—before settling on the Kinks in early 1964.

The Kinks made their first tour of Australia and New Zealand in January 1965 as part of a "package" bill that included Manfred Mann and the Honeycombs. They performed and toured relentlessly, headlining package tours throughout 1965 with performers such as the Yardbirds and Mickey Finn. Tensions began to emerge within the band, expressed in incidents such as the on-stage fight between drummer Mick Avory and Dave Davies at The Capitol Theatre, Cardiff, Wales, on 19 May. After finishing the first song, "You Really Got Me", Davies insulted Avory and kicked over his drum set. Avory responded by hitting Davies with his hi-hat stand, rendering him unconscious, before fleeing from the scene, fearing that he had killed his bandmate. Davies was taken to Cardiff Royal Infirmary, where he received 16 stitches to his head. To placate police, Avory later claimed that it was part of a new act in which the band members would hurl their instruments at each other. Following their summer 1965 American tour, the American Federation of Musicians refused permits for the group to appear in concerts in the US for the next four years, possibly due to their rowdy on-stage behaviour.

In April 1969, Davies helped negotiate an end to the American Federation of Musicians ban on the group, which allowed plans for a North American tour. However, over the next few years, Davies went into a state of depression, not helped by his collapsing marriage, culminating in his onstage announcement that he was "sick of it all" at a gig in White City Stadium, London, in 1973. A review of the concert published in Melody Maker stated: "Davies swore on stage. He stood at The White City and swore that he was 'F...... [sic] sick of the whole thing' [...] He was 'Sick up to here with it' [...] and those that heard shook their heads. Mick just ventured a disbelieving smile, and drummer [sic] on through 'Waterloo Sunset.'" Davies proceeded to try to announce that the Kinks were breaking up as the band were leaving the stage, but this attempt was foiled by the group's publicity management, who pulled the plug on the microphone system.

== Style ==
According to Jeff Mezydlo of Yardbarker, the Kinks combined the "pop-rock feel of the British invasion with a bluesy tint". The band started out playing the then popular R&B and blues styles; then, under the influence of the Kingsmen's "Louie Louie", developed louder and harder rock sounds. They have been labelled "the original punks". Dave Davies was "really bored with this guitar sound—or lack of an interesting sound", so he purchased "a little green amplifier [...] an Elpico" from a radio spares shop in Muswell Hill, and "twiddled around with it", including "taking the wires going to the speaker and putting a jack plug on there and plugging it straight into my AC30" (a larger amplifier), but did not get the sound he wanted until he got frustrated and "got a single-sided Gillette razorblade and cut round the cone [from the centre to the edge] [...] so it was all shredded but still on there, still intact. I played and I thought it was amazing, really freaky." The jagged sound of the amplifier was replicated in the studio; the Elpico was plugged into the Vox AC30, and the resulting effect became a mainstay in the Kinks' early recordings—most notably on "You Really Got Me" and "All Day and All of the Night".

From 1966 onwards, the Kinks came to be known for their adherence to traditions of English music and culture during a period when many other British bands dismissed their heritage in favour of American blues, R&B and pop styles. Ray Davies recalled that at a distinct moment in 1965, he decided to break away from the American scene and write more introspective and intelligent songs. "I decided I was going to use words more, and say things. I wrote 'A Well Respected Man'. That was the first real word-oriented song I wrote [...] [I also] abandoned any attempt to Americanise my accent." The Kinks' allegiance to English styles was strengthened by the ban placed on them by the American Federation of Musicians. The ban cut them off from the American record-buying public, the world's largest musical market, forcing them to focus on Britain and mainland Europe. The Kinks expanded on their English sound throughout the remainder of the 1960s, incorporating elements of music hall, folk, and baroque music through the use of harpsichord, acoustic guitar, Mellotron, and horns on albums such as Face to Face, Something Else by the Kinks, The Kinks Are the Village Green Preservation Society, and Arthur (Or the Decline and Fall of the British Empire), creating some of the most influential and important music of the period.

Beginning with Everybody's in Show-biz (1972), Ray Davies began exploring theatrical concepts on the group's albums; these themes became manifest on the 1973 album Preservation Act 1 and continued through Schoolboys in Disgrace (1976). The Kinks were less commercially successful with these conceptual works and were dropped by RCA, which had signed them in 1971. In 1977, they moved to Arista Records, which insisted on a more traditional rock format. Sleepwalker (1977), which heralded their return to commercial success, featured a mainstream, relatively slick production style that would become their norm. The band returned to hard rock for Low Budget (1979) and continued to record within the genre throughout the remainder of their career, combining this with pop music in the 1980s with albums such as Give the People What They Want and songs such as "Better Things".

== Legacy ==
The Kinks are regarded as one of the most influential rock acts of the 1960s and early 1970s. Stephen Thomas Erlewine called them "one of the most influential bands of the British Invasion". They were ranked 65th on Rolling Stone's 100 Greatest Artists of All Time. Peter Buck wrote in appreciation:

Ray wrote 'You Really Got Me' on piano. Then he gives it to his brother Dave, this teenage maniac, who turns it into a demented guitar part. I read that an interviewer once asked Dave if he thought the Kinks had gone heavy metal in the Eighties. He said, "It wasn't called heavy metal when I invented it." When R.E.M. started out, Dave's solo on that song was the only solo I knew how to play. So whenever I had to do a solo, I would just play that. The Kinks slipped into rock history through the back door. All of those great albums that we talk about now, like Face to Face, Something Else by the Kinks and Village Green — nobody bought those records in the Sixties. But those of us who love those records — and a lot of us are musicians — have loved them for decades.

The Who's Pete Townshend credited Ray Davies with inventing "a new kind of poetry and a new kind of language for pop writing that influenced me from the very, very, very beginning". Jon Savage wrote that the Kinks were an influence on American psychedelic rock groups "like the Doors, Love and Jefferson Airplane".

Artists influenced by the Kinks include punk rockers like the Ramones, the Clash, Blondie, and the Jam; heavy metal acts including Van Halen and Britpop groups such as Oasis and Blur. Craig Nicholls, singer and guitarist of the Vines, described the Kinks as "great songwriters, so underrated". Billy Corgan of the Smashing Pumpkins listed the Kinks as one of the best bands: "Ray is one of the greatest songwriters of all time. . . . If you're an alternative fan and you don't know the Kinks' influence on alternative music, you've kinda missed the boat on that."

They have two albums on Rolling Stones 2020 500 Greatest Albums of All Time list: The Kinks Are the Village Green Preservation Society (No. 384) and Something Else by the Kinks (No. 478). They have three songs on their 500 Greatest Songs of All Time list as updated in September 2021: "Waterloo Sunset" (No. 14), "You Really Got Me" (No. 176), and "Lola" (No. 386).

In 2015, it was reported that Julien Temple would direct a biographical film of the Kinks, You Really Got Me, but as of 2021, nothing had come of the project. Temple previously released a documentary about Ray Davies, Imaginary Man.

Sunny Afternoon, a musical based on the early life of Ray Davies and the formation of the Kinks, opened at the Hampstead Theatre in April 2014. The musical's title came from the band's 1966 hit single of the same name and features songs from the band's back catalogue.

Ray Davies played "Waterloo Sunset" at the closing of the 2012 London Olympic Games, 45 years after the song's release.

== Members ==
Past members

- Ray Davies – lead and backing vocals, rhythm guitar, keyboards, harmonica (1962–1997)
- Dave Davies – lead guitar, backing and lead vocals, occasional keyboards (1962–1997)
- Mick Avory – drums, percussion (1964–1984)
- Pete Quaife – bass, backing vocals (1962–1966, 1966–1969; died 2010)
- John Dalton – bass, backing vocals (1966, 1969–1976)
- John Gosling – keyboards, piano, backing vocals (1970–1978; died 2023)
- Andy Pyle – bass (1976–1978)
- Jim Rodford – bass, backing vocals (1978–1997; died 2018)
- Gordon John Edwards – keyboards, piano, backing vocals (1978–1979; died 2003)
- Ian Gibbons – keyboards, piano, backing vocals (1979–1989, 1993–1997; died 2019)
- Bob Henrit – drums, percussion (1984–1997)
- Mark Haley – keyboards, piano, backing vocals (1989–1993)

== Discography ==
The Kinks were active for more than three decades, between 1963 and 1996, releasing twenty-four studio albums and four live albums. The first two albums were released in different formats in the UK and US, partly because of the contrast in popularity of the extended play format—the UK market liked EPs, the US market did not, so US albums had the EP releases bundled onto them—and also because the US albums included the hit singles, while the UK albums did not; after The Kink Kontroversy in 1965, the UK/US album releases were the same. There have been somewhere between 100 and 200 compilation albums released worldwide.

The Kinks had five top 10 singles on the US Billboard chart and nine top 40 albums. In the UK, the group had seventeen top 20 singles and five top 10 albums. The RIAA has certified four of the Kinks' albums as gold records. Released in 1965, The Kinks Greatest Hits! was certified gold for sales of 1,000,000 on 28 November 1968—this was six days after the release of The Kinks Are the Village Green Preservation Society, which failed to chart worldwide. The group did not receive another gold record award until 1979's Low Budget. The 1980 live album One for the Road was certified gold on 8 December 1980. Give the People What They Want, released in 1981, received its certification on 25 January 1982 for sales of 500,000 copies. Despite not selling at the time of its release, Village Green was awarded a gold disc in the UK in 2018 for selling more than 100,000 copies. For the hit single "Come Dancing", the performing rights organisation ASCAP presented the Kinks with an award for "One of the Most Played Songs of 1983".

Studio albums

- Kinks (1964)
- Kinda Kinks (1965)
- The Kink Kontroversy (1965)
- Face to Face (1966)
- Something Else by the Kinks (1967)
- The Kinks Are the Village Green Preservation Society (1968)
- Arthur (Or the Decline and Fall of the British Empire) (1969)
- Lola Versus Powerman and the Moneygoround, Part One (1970)
- Percy (1971)
- Muswell Hillbillies (1971)
- Everybody's in Show-Biz (1972)
- Preservation Act 1 (1973)
- Preservation Act 2 (1974)
- Soap Opera (1975)
- Schoolboys in Disgrace (1975)
- Sleepwalker (1977)
- Misfits (1978)
- Low Budget (1979)
- Give the People What They Want (1981)
- State of Confusion (1983)
- Word of Mouth (1984)
- Think Visual (1986)
- UK Jive (1989)
- Phobia (1993)

Live albums

- Live at Kelvin Hall (1967)
- One for the Road (1980)
- Live: The Road (1988)
- To the Bone (1994)
- BBC Sessions: 1964–1977 (2001)

== See also ==
- Do It Again, 2009 documentary film
- Freakbeat
- Swinging London
