= Ian Gibbons (musician) =

English keyboardist (1952–2019)

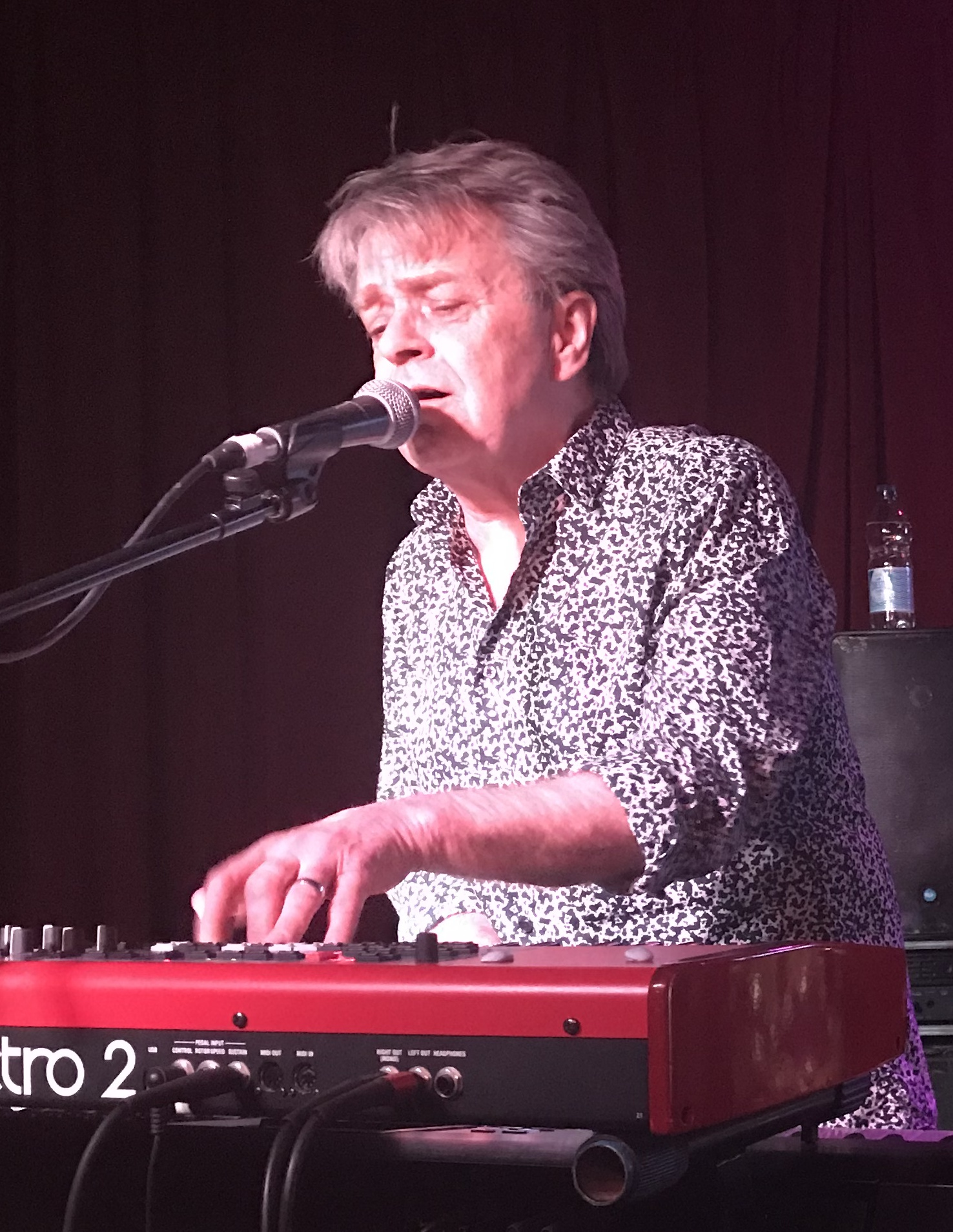

Background information
- Born: 18 July 1952
- Died: 1 August 2019 (aged 67)
- Occupation: Musician
- Instrument: Keyboards
- Years active: 1960s–2019
- Formerly of: The Kinks

Ian Gibbons (18 July 1952 – 1 August 2019) was an English keyboardist, most notable for playing with the Kinks.

Gibbons began playing the accordion at the age of nine, playing in the school band, and solo at music festivals, competitions and charity events. At the age of 14, he started a school rock band, playing guitar and singing. He changed to organ after leaving school and played in local and resident bands until 1972, when he joined Moonstone, which released three singles. Gibbons also worked with Love Affair and the Nashville Teens.

Punk and new wave came along and Gibbons worked with rock based and new wave bands until an audition for the Kinks in 1979. He was asked to join, and stayed with them until 1989, whilst also working with Dr. Feelgood, the Kursaal Flyers, Ken Hensley, Mike Vernon, Samson, Randy California and others, mainly recording. He rejoined the Kinks again in 1993, staying with them until their break-up in 1997.

Gibbons worked with Roger Chapman, the Sweet, Suzi Quatro and Ian Hunter (from 1989 onwards), before returning to the Kinks in 1993. He continued to record and perform with Chapman and Hunter, along with Chris Farlowe, Maggie Bell, Andy Scott, the Chicago Blues Brothers and on Ray Davies choir and other projects. In 2008, he joined the Kast Off Kinks, a line-up which includes or has included former Kinks members.

Ian Gibbons died from bladder cancer at home, on 1 August 2019, at the age of 67.

== Discography ==
=== The Kinks ===
- One For The Road keyboard, vocals (background)
- Give the People What They Want keyboard
- State of Confusion keyboard
- Word of Mouth keyboard, vocals (background)
- Think Visual keyboard, vocals (background)
- Live: The Road keyboard, vocals (background)
- UK Jive keyboard, vocals (background)
