= Come Dancing with The Kinks =

Come Dancing with The Kinks: The Best of 1977–1986

Compilation album by the Kinks
- Released: 2 June 1986
- Genre: Rock
- Length: 80:48 (1986 vinyl and cassette) 69:53 (1986 CD); 77:59 (2000 CD, 2004 SACD)
- Label: Arista
- Producer: Dave Nives

The Kinks chronology
Word of Mouth (1984)	Come Dancing with The Kinks: The Best of 1977–1986 (1986)	Think Visual (1986)

Professional ratings
Review scores
Source	Rating
AllMusic	4.5/5 stars
Christgau's Consumer Guide	B–

Come Dancing with The Kinks: The Best of 1977–1986 is a double album compilation by the Kinks, released on Arista Records in 1986.

Every one of the band's seven albums released by Arista during the time period indicated is represented here. Designed specifically for the American market, it peaked at No. 159 on the Billboard 200 and failed to chart in the United Kingdom.

== Content ==
This album comprises a survey of the band's output during their second period of commercial success after their early hits of the mid-1960s, this success predominantly in the United States. After four moderately successful concept albums for their previous label, RCA Records, their contract was not renewed. In 1976 they signed with a company recently launched by ex-Columbia Records head Clive Davis, Arista, making one live and six studio albums for the label during a stay of a decade. In an effort to reverse diminishing cash flow, the band jettisoned the horn players, back-up singers, and the theatricality of the mid-1970s work and embraced the arena rock styles of the period. Ray Davies decamped to New York and worked to write songs with the commercial American market in mind:

I started working with Clive. I think Sleepwalker was an attempt to make it more palatable to radio and that's why Clive wanted to get involved. I was working with him very closely in those days. I rented an apartment in New York, and I would take my demo tapes into his office, he'd play the songs and make comments, and I would go back and work on them.

Of the songs on the album, "A Rock 'N' Roll Fantasy", "Come Dancing", and "Don't Forget to Dance" made the top 40 on the Billboard Hot 100, with two just missing at number 41: "(Wish I Could Fly Like) Superman" and "Do It Again". Six consecutive albums covered by this compilation—Sleepwalker, Misfits, Low Budget, One for the Road, Give the People What They Want, and State of Confusion—all placed in the top 15 on the Billboard 200. Their final studio album for the label, Word of Mouth is also represented in this collection. The band left the label by 1986 for their next album, Think Visual.

== Release ==
The compilation contains thirteen tracks released as singles, including one non-album single, and six album tracks.

The original 1986 CD version varies from the original LP release, removing "Sleepwalker", "Catch Me Now I'm Falling", and "Misfits" entirely. The CD also has the longer 4:40 album version of "Don't Forget to Dance". Aside from the removal of those three tracks, the running order is maintained. These changes result in a shorter runtime of 69:53.

The album was reissued on CD in 2000 with a number of changes. It replaces the single versions of "Catch Me Now I'm Falling", "Sleepwalker", "Misfits", and "Don't Forget to Dance" with the longer album versions, and replaces the album version of "(Wish I Could Fly Like) Superman" with the 12" disco mix. The songs "Celluloid Heroes" (live version), "Juke Box Music", "Long Distance", "Heart of Gold" and the live intro to "Lola" were removed and "A Gallon of Gas", "Full Moon", and "Good Day" were added.

== Critical reception ==
In a contemporary review for Billboard, published on June 21, 1986, the compilation was highlighted as a "Pop Pick." The review described it as a "solid double set" that effectively reviewed the British quintet's last decade of work. The publication praised the inclusion of three live versions of earlier hits and the seasonal single "Father Christmas," noting that they were "added for good measure." The reviewer also commended Ray Davies' songwriting and artistic stance, stating that his tracks skillfully addressed "both jaunty and wistful slices of life," concluding that the release served as a "fitting 20th birthday salute" to the veteran band.

== Track listing ==
All songs are written by Ray Davies, except for "Living on a Thin Line" by Dave Davies.

=== Side one ===
No.	Title	Original release	Length
1.	"You Really Got Me" (live)	One for the Road, 1980	3:40
2.	"Destroyer"	Give the People What They Want, 1981	3:44
3.	"(Wish I Could Fly Like) Superman"	Low Budget, 1979	3:38
4.	"Juke Box Music"	Sleepwalker, 1977	3:42
5.	"A Rock 'N' Roll Fantasy"	Misfits, 1978	4:58

=== Side two ===
No.	Title	Original release	Length
1.	"Come Dancing"	State of Confusion, 1983	3:54
2.	"Sleepwalker"	Sleepwalker	3:27
3.	"Catch Me Now I'm Falling"	Low Budget	4:02
4.	"Do It Again"	Word of Mouth, 1984	4:09
5.	"Better Things"	Give the People What They Want	2:58

=== Side three ===
No.	Title	Original release	Length
1.	"Lola" (live)	One for the Road	5:42
2.	"Low Budget"	Low Budget	3:46
3.	"Long Distance"	State of Confusion	5:20
4.	"Heart of Gold"	State of Confusion	4:02
5.	"Don't Forget to Dance"	State of Confusion	4:15

=== Side four ===
No.	Title	Original release	Length
1.	"Misfits"	Misfits	4:19
2.	"Living on a Thin Line"	Word of Mouth	4:12
3.	"Father Christmas"	Non-album single	3:39
4.	"Celluloid Heroes" (live)	One for the Road	7:21

=== 2000 CD reissue ===
No.	Title	Original release	Length
1.	"Come Dancing"	State of Confusion, 1983	3:56
2.	"Low Budget"	Low Budget, 1979	3:49
3.	"Catch Me Now I'm Falling"	Low Budget	5:59
4.	"A Gallon of Gas"	Low Budget	3:50
5.	"(Wish I Could Fly Like) Superman" (12" extended)	Low Budget	6:00
6.	"Sleepwalker"	Sleepwalker, 1977	4:04
7.	"Full Moon"	Sleepwalker	3:52
8.	"Misfits"	Misfits, 1978	4:42
9.	"A Rock 'N' Roll Fantasy"	Misfits	5:01
10.	"Do It Again"	Word of Mouth, 1984	4:11
11.	"Better Things"	Give the People What They Want, 1981	2:59
12.	"Lola" (live)	One for the Road, 1980	4:47
13.	"You Really Got Me" (live)	One for the Road	3:40
14.	"Good Day"	Word of Mouth	4:35
15.	"Living on a Thin Line"	Word of Mouth	4:16
16.	"Destroyer"	Give the People What They Want	3:47
17.	"Don't Forget to Dance"	State of Confusion	4:39
18.	"Father Christmas"	Non-album single	3:42
