= Low Budget (song) =

Single by The Kinks

from the album Low Budget
- A-side: "(Wish I Could Fly Like) Superman"
- Released: January 1979
- Recorded: January 1979
- Genre: Rock
- Length: 3:36
- Label: Arista
- Songwriter: Ray Davies
- Producer: Ray Davies

The Kinks UK singles chronology
"Black Messiah" (1978)	"Low Budget" (1979)	"Moving Pictures" (1979)

The Kinks US singles chronology
"Live Life" (1978)	"(Wish I Could Fly Like) Superman"/ "Low Budget" (1979)	"Catch Me Now I'm Falling" (1979)

Low Budget track listing
- 11 tracks Side one: 1. "Attitude"; 2. "Catch Me Now I'm Falling"; 3. "Pressure"; 4. "National Health"; 5. "(Wish I Could Fly Like) Superman"; Side two: 6. "Low Budget"; 7. "In a Space"; 8. "Little Bit of Emotion"; 9. "A Gallon of Gas"; 10. "Misery"; 11. "Moving Pictures"

"Low Budget" is the sixth track from the Kinks' album of the same name. It was written, produced and sung by Ray Davies.

== Background ==
"Low Budget" was recorded in January 1979. It describes a man giving up his "expensive tastes" in order to save money. Like many of the tracks on Low Budget, it applies to the economic troubles occurring during the time that the album was released, such as strikes in Great Britain. However, AllMusic's Richard Gilliam claimed that the track's theme could "easily apply to just about any modern recession".

Although "Low Budget" refers to economic problems of the times in general, it also refers to some of Ray Davies' own personal concerns. In the song, Davies mocks his own fear of not having money and his frugality. The song also references Davies' vanity. The singer describes himself as once being well dressed and able to afford cigars, but now has to buy discount clothes and chew mints. He describes himself as "a cut-price person in a low-budget land." But despite being reduced to poverty, the singer expresses pride in his hair and his teeth. Author Thomas Kitts notes that even the title, used in the refrain "I'm on a low budget" could refer to Davies keeping himself on a tight budget.

When asked which guitar performance he was most proud of, the Kinks' guitarist Dave Davies noted "Low Budget", as well as "You Really Got Me", as a favorite. He said of this:

I like “Low Budget” [1979]. It’s wild. I like that kind of, almost country-style playing. It’s like a shape; I don’t even worry about what notes I play as I’m doing it. And if you catch a few open strings, you might get lucky with a weird clunk or a harmonic or something. I think all the best stuff is the stuff that happens before you’ve even realized what you’ve done. So “Low Budget” and, obviously, “You Really Got Me.”

— Dave Davies, Guitar World, 2014

== Release and reception ==
The song was originally released as the B-side of "(Wish I Could Fly Like) Superman". Trouser Press described "Low Budget" as being "raunchier" than its A-side, going on to comment on the rawness of Ray Davies' vocal and stating that "Ray's never been funnier nor Dave's guitar tougher sounding." Music critic Robert Christgau describes the song as a "sloppy burlesque." Critic Johnny Rogan praises its self-deprecating humor, calling the line "Don't think I'm tight if I don't buy a round" one of the best of Davies' career.

According to Davies, hearing the song on the radio in early 1979 helped inspire him to finish writing the rest of the songs for the Low Budget album.

== Live version ==
"Low Budget" became a popular song for the Kinks to play live in concert. Of a performance in Binghamton, New York on February 18, 1979, the Binghamton University newspaper Pipe Dream noted that "'Low Budget' became an audience effort when Davies ceded his microphone to members of the front row during the chorus." In 1980, a live version of "Low Budget" (recorded at Providence Civic Center, Providence, Rhode Island, on 23 September 1979) was released on the album One for the Road.
