= Attitude (The Kinks song) =

Song by The Kinks

from the album Low Budget
- Released: 10 July 1979 (US); 7 September 1979 (UK)
- Recorded: January 1979 – June 1979 at the Power Station and Blue Rock Studios, New York
- Genre: Rock
- Length: 3:47
- Label: Arista Records
- Songwriter: Ray Davies
- Producer: Ray Davies

Low Budget track listing
- 11 tracks Side one: 1. "Attitude"; 2. "Catch Me Now I'm Falling"; 3. "Pressure"; 4. "National Health"; 5. "(Wish I Could Fly Like) Superman"; Side two: 6. "Low Budget"; 7. "In a Space"; 8. "Little Bit of Emotion"; 9. "A Gallon of Gas"; 10. "Misery"; 11. "Moving Pictures"

"Attitude" is a song by the British rock band the Kinks, released on their album Low Budget. It was written by Ray Davies.

== Background ==
"Attitude" was a late addition to the Low Budget album, as it was not featured in early running orders of the album (songs such as "Destroyer", "Massive Reductions", and "Give the People What They Want" were used instead in early versions.)

== Release ==
"Attitude" was first released on the Low Budget album in 1979 as the opening track of said LP. The next year, a live version of the track appeared on the One for the Road album. This version would appear afterwards as the B-side of the live "You Really Got Me" single that same year. The song has also appeared on compilation albums such as The Kinks Greatest 1970-1986 and Picture Book.

== Critical opinion ==
"Attitude" was called "possibly [The Kinks'] best hard rocker of the era" by AllMusic critic Stephen Thomas Erlewine, who also referred to the song as a highlight from Low Budget. Richard Gilliam (also of AllMusic) said, "Favorably reminiscent of the best songs of their British Invasion days, 'Attitude' is a straight-forward, hard-rock effort, laced, of course, with front man Ray Davies’s energetically satirical vocals. The lead track on their 1979 Low Budget album, the song mocks the superficiality of the emerging image-obsessed 1980s. There’s a welcome maturity to the effort – as if Davies is more than willing to adopt the motifs of the era to enhance the substance of his message. Sociological considerations aside, this is a solidly good song musically, and one of the Kinks best mid-career hard-rock efforts." Rolling Stone said, "[Ray Davies's] muse takes a short vacation for 'Attitude,' which is humorlessly accusatory almost to the point of being reactionary."

On his Facebook account, Dave Davies praised the song as "one of my fave Kinks tracks."
