= Summer's Gone =

Single by The Kinks

from the album Word of Mouth
- B-side: "Going Solo"
- Released: 18 March 1985
- Recorded: June 1983 – September 1984 at Konk Studios, London
- Genre: Rock
- Length: 3:52; 3:33 (single edit)
- Label: Arista
- Songwriter: Ray Davies
- Producer: Ray Davies

The Kinks singles chronology
"Living on a Thin Line" (1985)	"Summer's Gone" (1985)	"How Are You" (1986)

"Summer's Gone" is a song by the British rock band the Kinks. Released on their 1984 album Word of Mouth, the song was written by the band's core songwriter, Ray Davies.

== Release ==
"Summer's Gone" was first released on Word of Mouth (the band's final album on Arista Records) in 1984, where it was the tenth and penultimate track on the album. Word of Mouth was a moderate success, but not as popular as the band's earlier albums for Arista. After which, the track was issued the next year as a single in America, rather than the Dave Davies written "Living on a Thin Line", which had been released as a promo single for radio stations, and had reached No. 24 on the Mainstream Rock Chart. However, unlike "Living on a Thin Line", the song did not chart on any charts. "Summer's Gone" also appeared on the 12-inch version of the "Do It Again" single, as well as the compilation album Picture Book.

== Critical opinion ==
Nick Hasted, author of You Really Got Me: The Story of The Kinks, said that "the song digs out lines which could be left over from 'Drivin'' in 1969." Writer Doug Hinman said in his book The Kinks: All Day and All of the Night that the song "is less strong as a single" and "weaker" than the previous promo, "Living on a Thin Line".
