= Give the People What They Want =

Give the People What They Want may refer to:

- "Give the People What They Want" (The O'Jays song), 1975
- Give the People What They Want (The Kinks album), 1981
  - "Give the People What They Want" (The Kinks song)
- Give the People What They Want (Sharon Jones & the Dap-Kings album), 2014
- Give the People What We Want: Songs of The Kinks, a 2001 tribute album to music of The Kinks
