= Life Goes On (The Kinks song) =

Single by The Kinks

from the album Sleepwalker
- A-side: "Juke Box Music" (U.S.)
- Released: May 18, 1977
- Recorded: September 1976
- Genre: Rock
- Length: 5:03
- Label: Arista
- Songwriter: Ray Davies
- Producer: Ray Davies

The Kinks singles chronology
"Sleepwalker" (1977)	"Life Goes On" (1977)	"Father Christmas" (1977)

"Life Goes On" is a song by the British rock band the Kinks. Appearing on their album Sleepwalker, it was written by the band's main songwriter, Ray Davies.

== Background ==
At a concert, Ray Davies described the song as being about "a man who tries to commit suicide and fails", jokingly calling it "a nice, happy sort of song".

The Kinks' guitarist, Dave Davies, said of the song's guitar solo, "Ideally, if I'm emotionally stimulated, I feel like I can play anything. With 'Life Goes On', we sat down and Ray just started playing it. It was the song that was really important: the emotion it created, the hollowness of it, but the fullness, as well. Those kinds of things really get me going. It just came out, because it was still that period where you could go into a studio and make a decent recording in a couple of days; you didn't have to spend three weeks just trying to get a sound on a drum computer. You could actually go in and do a song and the solos at the same time. I play off Ray's vocals, the way he expresses himself. Although I love guitar, it's still only an instrument that should help the song. That's my musical role, in a way."

== Release ==
"Life Goes On" was released as the ninth and final track on the Kinks' 1977 album Sleepwalker. Following the album release, the song was released as the B-side to the American version of Sleepwalker's second single, "Juke Box Music", in May of that year (in the UK and Germany, the song "Sleepless Night" was used instead). The single failed to chart. The song has since appeared on the box set The Arista Years.

== Critical opinion ==
AllMusic critic Denise Sullivan said, "A gentle acoustic guitar riff and organ lead into the touching story of 'Life Goes On' from the Kinks' 1977 album, Sleepwalker. As Ray Davies tells the story about a friend's suicide in an admonishing voice full of yearning, whining, and disbelief, brother Dave plays along empathetically with his layered rhythm guitar lead. It's an epic song filled with beautiful harmonies and musical touches that match the lyric. Plus, it closes out the album – as was the habit with the Kinks – with a song that sums up the action preceding it, musically and lyrically. Yet, it also stands entirely on its own and serves as the perfect segue to the follow-up album, in this case, Misfits. It's a feat worth noting when one song serves such multi-purposes."

Rolling Stone writer Billy Altman said that "in 'Life Goes On', we are warned that 'life'll hit you when you least expect it.' Yet in the end, there always remains a faint glimmer of hope: 'Take that frown off your head/'cause you're a long time dead.'"
