= Rock 'n' Roll Cities =

Single by The Kinks

from the album Think Visual
- B-side: "Welcome to Sleazy Town" (US)
- Released: 17 November 1986
- Recorded: January 1986 and June–August 1986 at Konk Studios, London
- Genre: Rock
- Length: 3:43
- Label: MCA
- Songwriter: Dave Davies
- Producer: Dave Davies

The Kinks singles chronology
"Do It Again" (1984)	"Rock 'n' Roll Cities" (1986)	"How Are You" (1986)

"Rock 'n' Roll Cities" is a song by the British rock group, the Kinks. The song appeared on the band's 1986 album, Think Visual, and, unlike most other Kinks songs, it was written by Dave Davies rather than his brother, Ray.

The track featured former Kinks drummer Mick Avory, despite his being kicked out of the band in 1984 during the Word of Mouth sessions due to conflicts with Dave Davies. This was the last Kinks track Avory performed on. Dave Davies has since praised Avory's drumming on the song, saying, "I really liked Mick's drumming on Rock 'n' Roll Cities."

== Release ==
"Rock 'n' Roll Cities" was released in November 1986 on the Think Visual LP, where it was the sixth track on the album. On the same day of the album's UK release, "Rock 'n' Roll Cities" was issued as a single in America, backed with another Think Visual track, "Welcome to Sleazy Town".

== Music video ==
In order to advertise, the song was featured in a music video. In the video, Ray Davies goes missing, so the rest of the band (including Dave Davies, who is busy with a wife and kids) attempt to find either Ray or a replacement. Ray is found in the end, and after a concert, a groupie is rejected by the "family man" Dave. Among the many auditioning to replace Ray were people dressed as musicians such as Freddie Mercury and Rick Astley. Also notable is the appearance of the then-departed Mick Avory, who assists the band in their search for Ray. Marina Sirtis, who played Deanna Troi on the television show Star Trek: The Next Generation, made an appearance in the video as Dave Davies's wife.

== Reception ==
"Rock 'n' Roll Cities" has received mixed reviews from critics. Stephen Thomas Erlewine in a retrospective review on AllMusic felt the song made the biggest impression. David Wild of Rolling Stone, however, was critical of the song, and wrote:

"Rock 'n' Roll Cities", the first single from Think Visual, is anything but a gutsy statement. This utterly uninspired tour song — written by Dave Davies around a woefully tired riff — engages in the worst sort of rock hucksterism. He even resorts to spitting out the names of a few cities, "from Buffalo to the Gulf of Mexico." This is the sort of desperate, airplay-seeking number that only a radio programmer could love.

Cash Box said that "This anthem is a tribute to the cities that are American rock and roll centers and is a genuinely effuive sentiment." Billboard called it a "loud, jangly bit of life-in-the-fast-lane stadium rock".

Author Thomas Kitts said that the song "is a delightful spoof not only of touring but of touring songs as well".

Ray Davies also had mixed feelings on the song, once stating, "When I first heard that song it made me sick. But then the next day I saw the humor in it."
