= Live: The Road =

Live album by the Kinks
- Released: 9 December 1987
- Recorded: 29 June – 1 July 1987, recorded by Fanta Sound mobile studio. September – overdubs at Konk Studios, London; 2–12 October mixing session at Puk Recording Studios, Denmark. 17–27 October mixing session at Konk Studios, London. 2–9 November – mastering at Masterdisk, New York City.
- Genre: Rock
- Length: 54:23
- Label: London
- Producer: Ray Davies

The Kinks chronology
Think Visual (1986)	Live: The Road (1987)	UK Jive (1989)

Singles from Live: The Road
- 1. "The Road" Released: 16 May 1988 (UK)

Professional ratings
Review scores
Source	Rating
AllMusic	1.5/5 stars
Rolling Stone	3/5 stars

Live: The Road is the third live album recorded by the British rock band, the Kinks. It was recorded at Merriweather Post Pavilion, Columbia, Maryland, on 29 June 1987, and at Mann Music Center, Philadelphia, Pennsylvania, on 1 July; the second date provided most of the material on the album. One new song, "The Road", was recorded in the Kinks' own studio in September. Most of the concert songs were previously released on other Kinks albums except for "The Road" and "It (I Want It)". The album was first released on 9 December 1987 in Germany, before being released on 11 January 1988 in the US and on 23 May 1988 in the UK.

Upon release, the album, like many other albums the band made at the time, was a flop, both commercially and critically. It reached number 110 on the US Billboard 200. AllMusic's Stephen Thomas Erlewine described the album as "a tepid document of their workmanlike arena rock shows from 1987" and said the album "wasn't anything special". Rolling Stone was more kind to the album, saying that "it's less predictable and more textured than the tiresome arena-rock performances of the early-Eighties Kinks."

== Track listing ==
All tracks are written by Ray Davies except "Living on a Thin Line", which was written by Dave Davies.

Side one
No.	Title	Length
1.	"The Road"	6:13
2.	"Destroyer"	3:46
3.	"Apeman"	3:50
4.	"Come Dancing"	3:55
5.	"Art Lover"	3:22
6.	"Cliches of the World (B Movie)"	4:49

Side two
No.	Title	Length
1.	"Think Visual"	3:13
2.	"Living on a Thin Line"	4:09
3.	"Lost and Found"	5:19
4.	"It (I Want It)"	6:55
5.	"Around the Dial"	4:45
6.	"Give the People What They Want"	4:07

== Personnel ==
The Kinks

- Ray Davies – lead vocals, guitar
- Dave Davies – guitar, backing vocals, lead vocals on "Living on a Thin Line"
- Jim Rodford – bass, backing vocals
- Bob Henrit – drums
- Ian Gibbons – keyboards, backing vocals

Production

- Ray Davies – producer
- Johnie Rosen – live recording engineer
- Dave Powell – overdub engineer
- George Holt – overdub assistant engineer
- Jeremy Allom – mix engineer
- Peter Iverson – mix assistant engineer
- Bob Ludwig – mastering engineer
