= Good Day (The Kinks song) =

Single by The Kinks

from the album Word of Mouth
- B-side: "Too Hot"
- Released: 10 August 1984
- Recorded: June 1983 – September 1984 at Konk Studios, London
- Genre: Rock
- Length: 4:35
- Label: Arista
- Songwriter: Ray Davies
- Producer: Ray Davies

The Kinks singles chronology
"State of Confusion" (1983)	"Good Day" (1984)	"Do It Again" (1984)

"Good Day" is a song released and performed by the British rock band the Kinks. The song, written by Ray Davies, appeared on the band's album Word of Mouth.

== Background ==
During the sessions for "Good Day", a drum machine was used instead of drummer Mick Avory, due to the conflicts between Avory and Dave Davies. Ray Davies said of this:

Dave and Mick just couldn't get along. There were terrible fights, and I got to the point where I couldn't cope with it any more. Push came to shove, and to avoid an argument I couldn't face....we were doing a track called "Good Day" and I couldn't face having Mick and Dave in the studio, so I did it with a drum machine.

== Release ==
"Good Day" was first released as a single in Britain (as well as Denmark, the Netherlands, Norway, and Sweden) in August 1984, backed with "Too Hot" (both songs would appear on Word of Mouth). A maxi-single, with "Don't Forget to Dance" added to the two tracks already on the 7 inch single, was also released in the UK. "Good Day", however, was unsuccessful, as it did not chart in any country. In November of that year, "Good Day" appeared as the third track on the first side of the Kinks' album Word of Mouth. Word of Mouth was a modest success in America (hitting No. 57), but the album did not achieve the Top 20 success that its predecessors State of Confusion, Give the People What They Want, and Low Budget had.

An extended edit of "Good Day" appears as a bonus track on some CD reissues of Word of Mouth.

== Reception ==
"Good Day", despite its commercial failures, has received generally positive feedback from critics. AllMusic's Stephen Thomas Erlewine cited the track as a highlight from the Word of Mouth disc of the compilation album, The Arista Years (which is a box set of all Kinks albums released on the Arista label) despite not doing so in his review of Word of Mouth. Rolling Stone writer David Fricke said that, "for 'Good Day,' Ray dusts off his old 'Sunny Afternoon' ennui with a languid melody and a fragile, winning chorus."

Ray Davies noted that in later years, some listeners thought the line "somebody told me that Diana was dead" referred to Diana, Princess of Wales. She died 13 years after the song was released; Davies reaffirmed the line referred to actress Diana Dors who died in 1984.
