= Black Messiah =

Black Messiah may refer to:

- The Black Messiah, a 1972 album by Cannonball Adderley
- Black Messiah (album), a 2014 album by D'Angelo and The Vanguard
- "Black Messiah" (song), a 1978 song by The Kinks
- Black Messiah (band), a German Viking/symphonic black metal band
- Fred Hampton an American activist and revolutionary socialist, dubbed "The Black Messiah" by J. Edgar Hoover
  - Judas and the Black Messiah, a 2021 American biographical historical drama film about the death of Fred Hampton
    - "Black Messiah", a 2021 song by Rakim from the Judas and the Black Messiah soundtrack
- Malcolm X, an African American revolutionary, Muslim minister and human rights activist dubbed "The Black Messiah" by J. Edgar Hoover
- Stokely Carmichael, an American activist, dubbed "The Next Black Messiah" by J. Edgar Hoover

== See also ==
- Race and appearance of Jesus, for theories on the subject of Jesus' race
- COINTELPRO, American covert and illegal projects from 1956 to disrupt political organizations
