= (Wish I Could Fly Like) Superman =

Single by The Kinks

from the album Low Budget
- B-side: "Low Budget"
- Released: December 1978
- Recorded: December 1978
- Studio: Konk
- Genre: Rock, disco
- Length: 3:36 (album version); 5:58 (12" extended edit)
- Label: Arista
- Songwriter: Ray Davies
- Producer: Ray Davies

The Kinks UK singles chronology
"Black Messiah" (1978)	"(Wish I Could Fly Like) Superman" (1978)	"Moving Pictures" (1979)

The Kinks US singles chronology
"Live Life" (1978)	"(Wish I Could Fly Like) Superman" (1979)	"A Gallon of Gas" (1979)

Low Budget track listing
- 11 tracks Side one: 1. "Attitude"; 2. "Catch Me Now I'm Falling"; 3. "Pressure"; 4. "National Health"; 5. "(Wish I Could Fly Like) Superman"; Side two: 6. "Low Budget"; 7. "In a Space"; 8. "Little Bit of Emotion"; 9. "A Gallon of Gas"; 10. "Misery"; 11. "Moving Pictures"

"(Wish I Could Fly Like) Superman" is a song written by Ray Davies that was first released on the Kinks' 1979 album, Low Budget. The song, inspired by Superman: The Movie, employs a disco beat and lyrics that describe the singer's wish to be like the fictional character Superman. The song's disco style was created as a response to Arista Records founder Clive Davis's request for "a club-friendly record", despite Ray Davies' hatred of disco.

The song was released as the lead single from Low Budget, becoming a moderate hit in North America. It has since appeared on numerous compilation and live albums.

== Background ==
"(Wish I Could Fly Like) Superman" was inspired by Ray Davies watching Superman: The Movie in late 1978. Ray Davies has said that the song was written as a joke in response to a request by music producer Clive Davis, who was then running Arista Records, for a record to appeal to clubs. Davies said of this: "It was kind of a joke, taking the piss out of Clive [Davis] wanting us to do a club-friendly record."

I've always admired Superman comics. I went to see the film when it came out at Christmas - that Christmas was three years ago - I was overwhelmed ... I thought it was so true to the comic books and I wanted to write kind of a rock disco cause I hate disco music as a rule ... but now we've got a sort of mix with a rock and roll backbeat and it works real well.

— Ray Davies, 1981

"(Wish I Could Fly Like) Superman", as well as its B-side, "Low Budget", were the first songs recorded for the Low Budget album, although, unlike the rest of the album, recorded in New York, the tracks were cut in Konk Studios. The band's recently hired studio engineer, John Rollo, said of the sessions for the two songs, "The album before Low Budget, Misfits was beautifully recorded, but not that rock and roll. I think the first two songs I did went extremely well, and the band wanted to spend some time in New York to get away from distractions, so they kept it as a raw band recording."

Dave Davies, initially unimpressed with the song, added guitar parts. Dave Davies also said of the song's release, "I think that one 'Superman' was, not the biggest mistake, but it could've been one of the biggest mistakes we made. I remember I had quite a difficult time with Ray while we were making the record, because I didn't like the direction it was going. It was a strange time for music in general, anyway. The fact that it's funny, that it was a humorous song, saved it. I don't feel bad about that song at all, but it could have been a big mistake."

During the recording of Low Budget, many alternate versions of "(Wish I Could Fly Like) Superman" were created. Studio engineer John Rollo said of the many versions: "On 'Superman' we must have mixed that song at Konk [studios] twenty times - and it was quite a long song - and to get it down for a 7-inch single version we had to do twenty edits. Then we were running out of days and [Ray] had to be out of the country. Clive Davis was always known as a totalitarian hands-on guy but Ray was having none of that, he was going to make the album he wanted."

== Lyrics and music ==
The song also evokes another movie from the era, Saturday Night Fever, and the 1960s Animals hit "We Got to Get Out of This Place". The lyrics describe an average person dreaming of being Superman in order to get through social issues. The lyrics combine "fantasy" and "mundanity", two of Davies' favorite themes. Author Thomas Kitts notes the irony in the lyrics sung by a weakling wishing he were Superman which, as with other songs Davies wrote, leads to the singer feeling resigned. Author Nick Hasted makes a similar point, that despite dreaming of being Superman, the singer remains Clark Kent and can't get over his fear of the bad news he keeps hearing. According to AllMusic critic Richard Gilliam, its lyrics are among "Ray Davies' most sharp-edged".

"(Wish I Could Fly Like) Superman" has a disco-like sound, though a hard rock version is sometimes performed in concert. The song features a four on the floor drum part as well as a prominent guitar riff played by Dave Davies. Critic Johnny Rogan describes the lyrics as "witty" and the music as "upbeat". Music critic Robert Christgau describes it as a "fusion of syndrum and macho-flash guitar".

== Release and reception ==
"(Wish I Could Fly Like) Superman", backed with "Low Budget", was released as the lead single from Low Budget. Although it was a chart failure in Europe, the song found moderate success in North America, reaching number 41 on the American Billboard charts and number 43 on the Canadian RPM charts. Charles Aaron of Spin attributed this success to the national sentiment in the United States at the time, saying, "'Superman' caught a mood — frankly, a lot of people felt like shit at the time, and Davies' wit was more broadly accessible than on some of his earlier, conceptual set pieces". Although multiple follow-up singles were issued, "(Wish I Could Fly Like) Superman" is the only single from the album to be released in both Britain and America. The 12" single included an approximately six-minute long extended edit of the song.

In addition to its appearance on Low Budget, the song is present on many of the band's compilation albums, including Come Dancing with The Kinks and The Ultimate Collection.

Billboard rated "(Wish I Could Fly Like) Superman" one of the top tracks from Low Budget. It described the song as a "strong pop and rock offering with outstanding vocals and instrumentation and biting lyrics. Cash Box said it "is a solid rocker with a steady beat, 'heavy metal' chording, nice phrasing and an analysis of the current British 'situation.'" Record World said that the Kinks "try out their disco shoes here without losing any of Ray Davies' esoterica". Producer Clive Davis described the song as tapping "the malaise at the tail end of the decade". In its review of the single, Trouser Press praised the band for "tackl[ing] disco and com[ing] away with more than a shred of dignity".

It also appeared in live form on the album One for the Road. Allmusic critic Bret Adams called this live version a "raw, stripped-down" rendition.

== Personnel ==
- Ray Davies – lead vocals, synthesizer
- Dave Davies – lead guitar, backing vocals
- Mick Avory – drums
- Jim Rodford – bass guitar, backing vocals

== Chart performance ==
Chart performance for "(Wish I Could Fly Like) Superman"
Chart (1979–1980)	Peak position
Australian Singles Chart	71
Canadian RPM Singles Chart	43
US Billboard Hot 100	41
