= Low Budget (album) =

Studio album by the Kinks
- Released: 10 July 1979 (US); 7 September 1979 (UK)
- Recorded: January – June 1979
- Studio: Power Station and Blue Rock, New York
- Genre: Hard rock
- Length: 43:16
- Label: Arista
- Producer: Ray Davies

The Kinks chronology
Misfits (1978)	Low Budget (1979)	One for the Road (1980)

Singles from Low Budget
- 1. "(Wish I Could Fly Like) Superman" Released: 26 January 1979; 2. "A Gallon of Gas" Released: 7 August 1979 (US); 3. "Catch Me Now I'm Falling" Released: 5 September 1979 (US); 4. "Moving Pictures" Released: 28 September 1979 (UK); 5. "Pressure" Released: 30 November 1979 (UK)

Low Budget is the eighteenth studio album by the English rock band the Kinks, released in 1979. It was their first to feature bassist Jim Rodford who would remain with the group until their disbandment in 1996. Following the minor success of their 1978 album Misfits, the band recorded the majority of the album in New York rather than London. Unlike the nostalgic themes of many of the Kinks' previous albums, several of Low Budget's songs allude to contemporaneous events. Musically, the album is a continuation of the band's "arena rock" phase, resulting in a more rock-based sound and more modern production techniques.

Despite being a relative failure in the UK, Low Budget was a critical and commercial success in the United States, becoming the Kinks' best-selling studio album and peaking at number 11 on the Billboard Top LPs & Tape chart. The lead single, "(Wish I Could Fly Like) Superman", was a minor hit in the US, reaching number 41.

== Background ==
After spending the majority of the 1970s focusing on ambitious concept albums, such as the two-part Preservation album, the Kinks began to lose the commercial success they had regained with their 1970 hit single "Lola". However, upon switching from RCA Records to Arista Records in the summer of 1976, the band gradually began to regain commercial success in the United States. Abandoning the conceptual work they had created during their RCA years, the band's 1977 album Sleepwalker and 1978 album Misfits were both modest hits in the United States, as were their respective lead singles, "Sleepwalker" and "A Rock 'n' Roll Fantasy".

However, throughout this period, the band's lineup began to fluctuate; bassist John Dalton, his short-term replacement Andy Pyle, and keyboardist John Gosling all departed the band, while founding drummer Mick Avory also considered leaving. Avory eventually agreed to stay, while ex-Argent bass player Jim Rodford, and keyboardist Gordon John Edwards were recruited, the latter having played with the Pretty Things on their album Silk Torpedo. Edwards was shortly afterwards fired from the group for failing to show up to sessions for Low Budget (although he recorded piano on at least one of the album's tracks), being replaced with Ian Gibbons following the album's release.

== Recording ==
Recording for Low Budget began in early 1979 at the band's own Konk Studios in London, where "(Wish I Could Fly Like) Superman", the result of Arista founder Clive Davis's request for a radio-friendly hit, and the album's title track were cut. After these sessions, the rest of the album was recorded at the Power Station and Blue Rock Studios in New York City. Studio engineer John Rollo said of these initial sessions, "The album before Low Budget, [Misfits] was beautifully recorded, but not that rock and roll. I think the first two songs I did, ["(Wish I Could Fly Like) Superman" and "Low Budget"] went extremely well and the band wanted to spend some time in New York, to get away from distractions and kept it as a raw band recording."

Recording in New York began in April 1979. After recently hiring and firing several keyboard players in quick succession, Ray Davies decided to play all of the keyboard parts for the tracks himself. Along with the tracks that appeared in the final running order of Low Budget, versions of songs that would appear on the album's 1981 follow-up Give the People What They Want, such as "Destroyer" and "Give the People What They Want" (and possibly "Yo-Yo" and "Better Things") were attempted. Also tried during the sessions were "Massive Reductions" (the B-side in the UK of "Better Things"), which was later re-recorded for the band's 1984 album Word of Mouth, and outtakes "Hidden Qualities" and "Laugh at the World". Final mixes and the running order for the album were worked on during June of that year.

== Music and lyrics ==
After a decade of concept albums and songs that recalled simpler times, Low Budget marked a new direction for the Kinks by addressing contemporary issues such as inflation, labour disputes (which were especially severe in the UK during the 1978-79 Winter of Discontent), and the 1979 energy crisis. Songs such as "Catch Me Now I'm Falling", which was Davies' take on the US's declining influence in the world, "(Wish I Could Fly Like) Superman", "Low Budget", and "A Gallon of Gas", epitomised these themes.

Mick Avory said of the album's lyrics, "Ray's writing was [previously] too subtle. When we did the big arenas in the late seventies he was writing harder stuff that would come across. When we signed with Arista, Clive Davis would always talk about getting us into the bigger venues and the music changed so we could get them across in the large places. When we made Low Budget, that was a turning point really."

Musically, the album drew on the punk scene in the UK as well as the arena rock culture in the US. Ray Davies explained, "Low Budget was overtly in the London vernacular. It was a curious time because we were starting to make it in America, which was still Styx and big hair and perfect guitar phrases. It was a fine balancing act between something that was affected by punk and being British and doing something suitable for US stadium shows".

== Release and reception ==
Professional ratings
Review scores
Source	Rating
AllMusic	4/5 stars
Blender	3/5 stars
Christgau's Record Guide	B−
MusicHound Rock: The Essential Album Guide	3/5 stars
Music Week	4/4 stars

Prior to the release of Low Budget, "(Wish I Could Fly Like) Superman" was released as a single in early 1979, backed with "Low Budget". Although the single failed to make an impact in Britain, it became a modest hit in the United States, reaching No. 41. Low Budget was then released on 10 July 1979 in the US and on 7 September 1979 in Britain. The album proved to be a major success in the United States, reaching No. 11 on the Billboard Top LPs & Tape chart (the band's highest charting studio album to date). Despite the commercial success the album achieved in the US, the album, like every Kinks album since 1967's Something Else by the Kinks, was unable to chart in their native Britain. Follow-up singles to "Superman" were issued ("A Gallon of Gas" and "Catch Me Now I'm Falling" in the US, "Moving Pictures" and "Pressure" in Britain) but they failed to chart.

Low Budget generally received positive reception from music critics, despite most feeling the album was not perfect. Melody Maker spoke positively of the album, saying, "Low Budget is actually worth spending money on." Rolling Stone also praised the album, saying, "the Kinks haven't mounted this kind of rock & roll attack since 'Lola.'" They concluded, "Low Budget may not be the best of their twenty-odd albums released in America, but it's not bad either." Philip Bashe of Good Times wrote, "Strangely, Low Budget is an encouraging album. ... Their playing on this record is heartier than ever, and Ray himself is no longer coy in his delivery[.]" Trouser Press critic Mark Fleischmann said of Low Budget, "Flaws aside, it's still a great album." Cash Box mentioned the album's grittiness and topical lyrics, and thought that the song "Little Bit of Emotion" should become a classic. The Globe and Mail noted that, "as if spurred on and awakened by the new energy of both disco and the new wave, Ray Davies and company have incorporated elements of both into their still witty and incisive lyrics."

In the US, a version of "Low Budget" was issued on the 12" single of "Superman" that had the addition of two more verses; this version runs 4:48. This version, like the extended "Come Dancing" four years later, has never been issued as a bonus track, despite many reissues of the album, and can only be found on vinyl.

The Kinks launched an extensive concert tour in the US to support the album. Six of the eleven songs from the album are included on the double-live album One for the Road which was recorded in 1979 and 1980 during the Low Budget tour.

Low Budget was reissued on CD in 1999 with extended versions of album songs as bonus tracks, including the previously unreleased version of "Catch Me Now I'm Falling".

== Track listing ==
All tracks are written by Ray Davies.

Side 1
No.	Title	Length
1.	"Attitude"	3:47
2.	"Catch Me Now I'm Falling"	5:58
3.	"Pressure"	2:27
4.	"National Health"	4:02
5.	"(Wish I Could Fly Like) Superman"	3:36

Side 2
No.	Title	Length
1.	"Low Budget"	3:50
2.	"In a Space"	3:44
3.	"Little Bit of Emotion"	4:51
4.	"A Gallon of Gas"	2:41
5.	"Misery"	2:57
6.	"Moving Pictures"	3:47

CD reissue bonus tracks
No.	Title	Length
12.	"A Gallon of Gas" (U.S. Single Extended Edit)	3:49
13.	"Catch Me Now I'm Falling" (Original Extended Edit)	6:49
14.	"(Wish I Could Fly Like) Superman" (Disco Mix Extended Edit)	5:58

== Personnel ==
The Kinks

- Ray Davies – guitar, keyboards, vocals
- Dave Davies – guitar, background vocals
- Jim Rodford – bass, background vocals
- Mick Avory – drums
- Gordon Edwards – piano on "Low Budget"

Additional personnel

- Nick Newall – saxophone

Technical

- John Rollo – engineer
- "Special thanks to" Scott Litt and Raymond Willhard
- Bob Ludwig - mastering engineer
- Gary Gross – photography
- Ron Kellum – design and art direction
- Cover concept by Ray Davies
