= Pressure (The Kinks song) =

Single by the Kinks

from the album Low Budget
- B-side: "National Health" (UK); "A Gallon of Gas" (France)
- Released: 30 November 1979 (UK)
- Recorded: January–June 1979
- Genre: Punk rock
- Length: 2:27
- Label: Arista
- Songwriter: Ray Davies
- Producer: Ray Davies

The Kinks singles chronology
"Moving Pictures" (1979)	"Pressure" (1979)	"Better Things" (1981)

Low Budget track listing
- 11 tracks Side one: 1. "Attitude"; 2. "Catch Me Now I'm Falling"; 3. "Pressure"; 4. "National Health"; 5. "(Wish I Could Fly Like) Superman"; Side two: 6. "Low Budget"; 7. "In a Space"; 8. "Little Bit of Emotion"; 9. "A Gallon of Gas"; 10. "Misery"; 11. "Moving Pictures"

"Pressure" is the third track and third British single from the Kinks' 1979 album, Low Budget. It was written by Ray Davies.

== Lyrics and music ==
In "Pressure", the singer has "got pressure" that is "really contagious". He goes on to say that "you can pick it up anywhere and it can be quite dangerous" and that "you can spread it mouth to mouth" and you "can even get it when you're alone". The singer complains that he gets pressure "driving in [his] motor car", "when [he's] drinking in a bar", when he's "riding on the subway", and that he gets "it regular every day". However, the singer can forget the pressure whenever he is close to his lover.

== Release and reception ==
"Pressure", as well as appearing on Low Budget, was released as a single in Britain and France in late 1979. Backed with "National Health" (but with "A Gallon of Gas" in France), the single was the final one to be taken from Low Budget. The single, however, failed to chart. One year later, "Pressure" was released on the live album One for the Road; this version was recorded at Providence Civic Center, Providence, Rhode Island, on 23 September 1979.

AllMusic's Richard Gilliam said that "'Pressure' wants to be an anthem but never really develops any sort of compelling continuity. The song kicks off well with a brief rockabilly riff, but Ray Davies’ showy vocals seem to be more interested in conveying a sense of speed than in developing an interesting melody. Nonetheless, it's a fun, fast, song, though it's nothing a Kinks’ fan would be likely to list as one of their favorites. At just over two minutes in length, 'Pressure' has the good sense to get over with quickly before wearing out it's [sic] welcome." David Fricke of Rolling Stone said that in "Pressure" Davies "acknowledges that his Everyman is beset by catastrophes not of his own making".
