= One for the Road (The Kinks album) =

Live album by the Kinks
- Released: 4 June 1980
- Recorded: 3 March 1979 – 4 March 1980
- Genre: Rock
- Length: 77:21
- Label: Arista
- Producer: Ray Davies

The Kinks chronology
Low Budget (1979)	One for the Road (1980)	Give the People What They Want (1981)

Singles from One for the Road
- 1. "Lola" Released: July 1980 (US); 2. "You Really Got Me" Released: 29 October 1980 (US)

One for the Road is a 1980 live album and video by the Kinks. It was released on 4 June 1980 on LP and cassette in the US, on video on 25 June 1980 in the US, and on 1 August 1980 in the UK.

== Overview ==
Most of the recordings date from a portion of the 1979–1980 American tour in support of the band's Low Budget album, hence the inclusion of six songs from that LP. Those songs were augmented by a selection of hits dating back to the band's formation in 1964.

== Release ==
The 4-track EP titled The Kinks Live EP with songs "David Watts", "Where Have All The Good Times Gone", "Attitude" and "Victoria" was released along with the album.

The song "20th Century Man" was omitted from original CD released but was reinstated on later CD editions.

== Reception ==
Professional ratings
Review scores
Source	Rating
AllMusic	2.5/5 stars
Rolling Stone	positive
Smash Hits	4/10 stars

In his 1980 review of the album for Smash Hits, David Hepworth said that the album was "as convincing an argument for banning live albums as you'll find". In their brief review, AllMusic wrote that "One for the Road is a fascinating document of trailblazing elder statesmen who paved the way for heavy metal and punk, but never felt a glorious pop song was out of their grasp."

== Track listing ==
All tracks written by Ray Davies.

Side one

1. "Opening" – 1:43 recorded at Landmark Theatre, Syracuse, New York, 4 March 1980
2. "The Hard Way" – 2:42 recorded at The Barn, Rutgers University, New Brunswick, New Jersey, 3 March 1979
3. "Catch Me Now I'm Falling" – 4:49 recorded at Providence Civic Center, Providence, Rhode Island, 23 September 1979
4. "Where Have All the Good Times Gone" – 2:16 recorded at Lowell Memorial Auditorium, Lowell, Massachusetts, 6 March 1979
5. Intro: Lola – 0:54 recorded at Providence Civic Center, Providence, Rhode Island, 23 September 1979
6. "Lola" – 4:47 recorded at Providence Civic Center, Providence, Rhode Island, 23 September 1979
7. "Pressure" – 1:31 recorded at Providence Civic Center, Providence, Rhode Island, 23 September 1979

Side two

1. "All Day and All of the Night" – 3:45 recorded at The Barn, Rutgers University, New Brunswick, New Jersey, 3 March 1979
2. "20th Century Man" – 6:19 recorded at The Barn, Rutgers University, New Brunswick, New Jersey, 3 March 1979
3. "Misfits" – 3:57 recorded at Providence Civic Center, Providence, Rhode Island, 23 September 1979
4. "Prince of the Punks" – 3:52 recorded at Landmark Theatre, Syracuse, New York, 4 March 1980
5. "Stop Your Sobbing" – 2:38 recorded at Landmark Theatre, Syracuse, New York, 4 March 1980

Side three

1. "Low Budget" – 5:57 recorded at Providence Civic Center, Providence, Rhode Island, 23 September 1979
2. "Attitude" – 3:52 recorded at The Volkshaus, Zürich, Switzerland, 11 November 1979
3. "(Wish I Could Fly Like) Superman" – 6:29 recorded at The Volkshaus, Zürich, Switzerland, 11 November 1979
4. "National Health" – 4:08 recorded at Landmark Theatre, Syracuse, New York, 4 March 1980

Side four

1. "Till the End of the Day" – 2:42 recorded at Landmark Theatre, Syracuse, New York, 4 March 1980
2. "Celluloid Heroes" – 7:22 recorded at The Volkshaus, Zürich, Switzerland, 11 November 1979
3. "You Really Got Me" – 3:35 recorded at Lowell Memorial Auditorium, Lowell, Massachusetts, 6 March 1979
4. "Victoria" – 2:34 recorded at The Volkshaus, Zürich, Switzerland, 11 November 1979
5. "David Watts" – 2:05 recorded at Landmark Theatre, Syracuse, New York, 4 March 1980

=== Video ===
1. "Opening"
2. "All Day and All of the Night"
3. Intro: Lola
4. "Lola"
5. "Low Budget"
6. "(Wish I Could Fly Like) Superman"
7. "Attitude"
8. "Celluloid Heroes"
9. "The Hard Way"
10. "Where Have All the Good Times Gone"
11. "You Really Got Me"
12. "Pressure"
13. "Catch Me Now I'm Falling"
14. "Victoria"
15. "Day-O" (snippet sung)

== Personnel ==
The Kinks

- Ray Davies – guitar, harmonica, keyboards, vocals
- Dave Davies – lead guitar, backing vocals
- Ian Gibbons – keyboards, backing vocals
- Mick Avory – drums
- Jim Rodford – bass, backing vocals

Additional personnel

- Nick Newall – additional keyboards

Technical

- Barry Ainsworth / Mobile I – recording
- Mike Moran / RCA Mobile Truck – recording
- Arnie Rosenberg / Roadmaster II – recording
- Brooks Taylor / Showco, Inc. – recording
- Michael Ewasko – mixing engineer
- Bob Ludwig – mastering engineer
- Howard Fritzson – art direction
- Lauren Recht – photography

== Charts ==
Album

Year	Chart	Position
1980	Billboard Pop Albums	14

== Certifications and sales ==
Region	Certification	Certified units/sales
Belgium	—	35,000
United States (RIAA)	Gold	500,000^{^}
^{^} Shipments figures based on certification alone.
