= The Road (The Kinks song) =

Single by The Kinks

from the album Live: The Road
- B-side: "Art Lover" (live)
- Released: 11 January 1988 (US); 16 May 1988 (UK)
- Recorded: September 1987
- Genre: Rock
- Length: 6:13
- Label: MCA
- Songwriter: Ray Davies
- Producer: Ray Davies

The Kinks singles chronology
"Lost and Found" (1987)	"The Road" (1988)	"Down All the Days (Till 1992)" (1989)

"The Road" is a song by the English rock band the Kinks, written by frontman Ray Davies, and serves as the opening track of their 1988 live album Live: The Road.

== Lyrics ==
Described as "a chronicle of the band's typical touring experiences" by AllMusic's Stephen Thomas Erlewine, "The Road" mentions the singer's experiences in with "bed and breakfasts and the greasy spoons ... loser bars and the noisy rooms ... [and] the casualties who did too many lines." This topic of touring has been addressed by Ray Davies multiple times prior to the writing of this song, from "This Time Tomorrow" from Lola Versus Powerman and the Moneygoround, Part One to "Life on the Road" from the album Sleepwalker.

== Release and reception ==
"The Road" was released on the 1988 album, Live: The Road, where it was the song recorded in the studio (and one of the two songs on the album never before released). However, prior to the release of Live: The Road, "The Road" saw single release in Britain (but not America). Backed with a version of "Art Lover" from Live: The Road, the single failed to chart, being the first of three consecutive singles not to chart in the United Kingdom. It has since appeared on the compilation albums Lost & Found (1986–1989) and Picture Book.

Despite citing the song as a highlight from both Live: The Road and Lost & Found (1986–1989), Stephen Thomas Erlewine said that "like the rest of [Live: The Road], the song wasn't anything special."
