= This Is Where I Belong – The Songs of Ray Davies & The Kinks =

Compilation album by various artists
- Released: 2002
- Length: 50:03
- Label: Praxis, Rykodisc

This Is Where I Belong – The Songs of Ray Davies & The Kinks is a compilation album, a tribute to the Kinks by various artists, released in 2002 by Praxis Recordings and manufactured and marketed by Rykodisc (Rykodisc RCD 10621). The executive producer is Jim Pitt; the associate producers include Jack Emerson, Andy McLenon, and Brad Hunt.

Fountains of Wayne performed their Kinks cover, "Better Things", on Late Night with Conan O'Brien ten days after the 9/11 terrorist attacks.

== Track listing ==
1. "Better Things" by Fountains of Wayne – 3:08
2. "Starstruck" by Steve Forbert – 3:29
3. "Stop Your Sobbing" by Jonathan Richman – 2:17
4. "No Return" by Bebel Gilberto – 4:08
5. "A Well Respected Man" by Josh Rouse – 3:13
6. "Victoria" by Cracker – 3:32
7. "Who'll Be the Next in Line" by Queens of the Stone Age – 2:28
8. "Big Sky" by Matthew Sweet – 2:50
9. "Art Lover" by Lambchop – 5:04
10. "Picture Book" by Bill Lloyd and Tommy Womack – 2:46
11. "Muswell Hillbilly" by Tim O'Brien – 3:54
12. "Get Back in Line" by The Minus 5 – 3:05
13. "'Till the End of the Day" by Fastball – 2:21
14. "This Is Where I Belong" by Ron Sexsmith – 2:19
15. "Fancy" by Yo La Tengo – 2:50
16. "Waterloo Sunset" by Ray Davies and Damon Albarn – 2:39
