= Predictable (The Kinks song) =

Single by The Kinks

from the album Give the People What They Want
- B-side: "Back to Front" (UK); "Art Lover" (Netherlands)
- Released: 30 October 1981
- Recorded: May 1979 – June 1981 at Konk Studios, London
- Length: 3:31
- Label: Arista ARIST 426 (UK)
- Songwriter: Ray Davies
- Producer: Ray Davies

The Kinks singles chronology
"Better Things" (1981)	"Predictable" (1981)	"Come Dancing" (1983)

Music video
- "Predictable" on YouTube

"Predictable" is the fourth track from the Kinks' 1981 album, Give the People What They Want. It was written by Ray Davies.

== Lyrics ==
The lyrics of "Predictable" describe the monotony of the average person's life. "Yeah, ain't life a bore", the singer complains, saying that he doesn't "know why I'm even bothering". However, the singer has hope, claiming that "one day it's gonna get better some way", but would even settle to "wish it would get worse any way". He goes as far to say that it "feels like a good time to die". The song, like many written by Davies, comments on the life of the middle class in a sarcastic fashion.

== Release and reception ==
"Predictable" was first released in the UK as a single, backed with "Back to Front". The single was unsuccessful, despite the popularity of its predecessor, "Better Things". However, in America, it was only released on the Give the People What They Want album (and not as a single).

Robert Christgau said that "Predictable" was "self-fulfilling", implying that the track was not unique.

=== Music video ===
In order to promote the track, Ray Davies performed in a video for "Predictable" in London. Davies is the sole performer, dressing up in several different styles from the 1930s to the 1980s. Produced by Michael Hamlyn, as well as directed by Julien Temple of midnight Films, the video first appeared on the American television channel MTV in December 1981 (as well as Jacques Martin, a French show, on the 13th of said month). The video was one of many that the Kinks filmed, with other promotional clips being filmed for "Come Dancing", "Don't Forget to Dance", "State of Confusion", and "Do It Again", among others.
