= Better Things (The Kinks song) =

Single by The Kinks

from the album Give the People What They Want
- B-side: "Massive Reductions" (UK); "Yo-yo" (US)
- Released: 19 June 1981 (UK); 28 November 1981 (US)
- Recorded: April 1981 at Konk Studios, Hornsey, London
- Genre: Pop
- Length: 2:59 (single version); 2:44 (LP version)
- Label: Arista ARIST 415 (UK); Arista AS 0649 (US)
- Songwriter: Ray Davies
- Producer: Ray Davies

The Kinks UK singles chronology
"Pressure" (1979)	"Better Things" (1981)	"Predictable" (1981)

The Kinks US singles chronology
"Destroyer" (1981)	"Better Things" (1981)	"Come Dancing" (1983)

"Better Things" is a song by the Kinks, released as a single in June 1981 in the UK and November 1981 in the US. A slightly shorter version was later released on their album Give the People What They Want.

Written about Ray Davies's failing marriage, the song originated during the Low Budget sessions. The song was completed in 1981 and released as a single, reaching number 46 in the UK and number 92 in America. The single marked the band's first appearance in the UK charts since 1972.

In 2011, American Songwriter named "Better Things" their Favorite Breakup Song.

== Background ==
"Better Things" was penned by Ray Davies in New York City about the "impending split" from his second wife, Yvonne. Davies told Jeff Tamarkin of The Aquarian Weekly that the time when the song was written was a "depressing" time for him. Musically, Davies characterized the song as prototypically Kinks-style, explaining, "It's got a musical phrase in it that makes it a song like 'Days'. It's just going up the scale, but when I reach F sharp, instead of going to a B seven, I go to an F sharp major. It's just a change, a musical trick".

The song dates back to the sessions of the Low Budget album, during which an early version of the song was attempted. Davies explained, "That song was written in 1979, and it was turned down for Low Budget because the band couldn't get it together". The song was later recorded for Give the People What They Want in April 1981, with the recording session dubbed by Ray Davies as "a total send-up".

In 1981, Davies named it one of the best tracks on the album and stated, "I really like the song, 'Better Things'. It gives me hope. And after a song like 'A Little Bit Of Abuse' [the previous song on the album], you need some hope".

== Release and reception ==
The track was released as the lead single for the album in the UK. Initial copies came with a bonus 7" containing live versions of "Lola" and "David Watts" recorded on American tours in 1979 and 1980. The UK B-side was a non-LP song "Massive Reductions" (a different, shorter version of "Massive Reductions" was released on the band's 1984 album Word of Mouth). Although "Better Things" missed the top 40, it did reach No. 46 and was their first charting single since "Supersonic Rocket Ship" in 1972.

In the US, "Destroyer" was released in September as the album's lead single with "Better Things" as the second single in November. "Better Things" reached No. 12 on the Billboard Rock Top Tracks chart and No. 92 on the Billboard Hot 100, slightly lower than "Destroyer".

In September 2010, Ray Davies released See My Friends, an album of reworked classic Kinks songs, which contains a duet of "Better Things" with Bruce Springsteen.

== Chart performance ==
Chart (1981)	Peak position
UK Singles (The Official Charts Company)	46
US Billboard Hot 100	92

== Covers ==
- Pearl Jam recorded a version of the song and released it on side A of their 2011 fan club single.
- The American punk rock band Bouncing Souls covered the song in their album The Gold Record.
- Dar Williams covered the song on her album End of the Summer.
- Fountains of Wayne covered the song on Late Night with Conan O'Brien ten days after the 9/11 terrorist attacks. Their version of the song later appeared on This Is Where I Belong - The Songs of Ray Davies & The Kinks, a tribute CD released on 2 April 2002. It was used in the soundtrack of The Manchurian Candidate (2004).
- Members of Counting Crows covered the song on their live "Devil and the Bunny Show" at New Orleans' Shim Sham club on 5 May 2003. The recording exists on various bootlegs but was never publicly released.
- Frank Black recorded a cover version in 1996 as a B side from "The Marsist" 7" (from his album The Cult of Ray)
- Marky Ramone and The Intruders included their own version in their 1996 debut album of the same name.
- North Carolina honky-tonk band John Howie Jr. & The Rosewood Bluff released a cover version as a single in 2020.

== Other Media ==
"Better Things" was featured in the soundtrack of Adam Sandler's film Grown Ups (2010). Sandler wrote and starred in the film. It was directed by Dennis Dugan.
