= Sleepwalker (The Kinks album) =

Studio album by the Kinks
- Released: February 1977
- Recorded: 1 July – 20 December 1976
- Studios: Konk, London
- Genre: Rock
- Length: 40:10
- Label: Arista
- Producer: Ray Davies

The Kinks chronology
Schoolboys in Disgrace (1975)	Sleepwalker (1977)	Misfits (1978)

Singles from Sleepwalker
- 1. "Sleepwalker" Released: 18 March 1977; 2. "Juke Box Music" Released: 10 June 1977

Sleepwalker is the sixteenth studio album by the English rock group, the Kinks, released in 1977, and their first album for the Arista label.

Sleepwalker marked a return to straight-ahead, self-contained rock songs after several years of concept albums. It is the first album in what critics usually call the "arena rock" phase of the group, in which more commercial and mainstream production techniques would be employed. The lineup of the Kinks also was trimmed down as the brass section and backup singers were removed and the band returned to a standard rock band outfit.

The album also marks the last appearance of bassist John Dalton, who worked with the band since 1969 and left the band during the album's recording sessions.

== Background ==
Despite their success with the hit singles "Lola" and "Apeman" in 1970, the Kinks had less and less commercial success throughout the 1970s, largely attributed to bandleader Ray Davies's shift toward concept albums and a theatrical sound for the band. After the release of the band's more rock-oriented 1975 album, Schoolboys in Disgrace, the Kinks switched labels from RCA Records to Clive Davis' Arista Records, signaling a transition toward less theatrical material.

Following the band's signing to Arista, plans for a new album began to emerge. Just prior to the album's recording, the band's Konk Studios was equipped with a new 24-track recorder. Davies said to Melody Maker in 1976 of the upcoming recording sessions for a new Kinks album, "Yes, I am looking forward to it, because the situation is right. It's a great studio; I'm proud of it."

== Recording ==
Beginning in May 1976, the band began rehearsing new material (up to thirty new tracks) Ray Davies had penned, with twenty songs attempted by the band. Rejected song titles included "Power of Gold", "Stagefright", "Restless", and "Elevator Man". Throughout July 1976, multiple songs were recorded (though most were rejected), including the album's "Juke Box Music", "Life on the Road", and "Brother", future follow-up album Misfits' "Hay Fever" and "In a Foreign Land", future B-sides "Prince of the Punks" and "Artificial Light" (flipsides to "Father Christmas" and "A Rock 'n' Roll Fantasy", respectively), and the rejected "Back to 64 / Decade", "Lazy Day", and "The Poseur".

In September, more songs for the album were recorded, including "Full Moon", "Sleepwalker", "Sleepless Night", and "Life Goes On". Rejects "Child Bride", "Everything Is Alright", "One Woman Man", and "On the Outside" were also made. In October, new versions of "Juke Box Music" and "Life on the Road" were recorded, as well as the new "Stormy Sky". Another Misfits song, "Black Messiah", was also attempted, but was held off the album. During this time, longtime bassist John Dalton left the band, citing his lack of family time, the stresses of the road, and low pay as reasons. Overdubs by the remaining four-piece were added throughout the rest of October and November.

To replace Dalton, ex-Blodwyn Pig bassist Andy Pyle was added to the group. The band then recorded "Mr. Big Man" in December, which, when added to the album's running order, replaced "In a Foreign Land".

== Release and reception ==
Professional ratings
Review scores
Source	Rating
AllMusic	3.5/5 stars
Blender	2/5 stars
Christgau's Record Guide	B−

Sleepwalker was released during February 1977 in both the US and UK. Although the album, like all Kinks albums since 1967's Something Else by The Kinks, failed to chart in the UK, the album proved to be a success in the US, reaching No. 21 on the Billboard 200. That following March, the title track of the album, backed with "Full Moon", reached No. 48 in the US, becoming the first Kinks single to reach the Billboard Hot 100 since "Apeman" in 1970. Its follow-up single, "Juke Box Music", failed to make an impact. Although Clive Davis had originally pushed for "Brother" to be released as a single, comparing its appeal to that of Simon and Garfunkel's "Bridge over Troubled Water", it never saw an official single release.

Critical reaction to the album was generally positive, an improvement on the band's previous reception during their theatrical incarnation. Sleepwalker was lauded by Billy Altman of Rolling Stone, who said, "The Kinks' playing on Sleepwalker is easily their most powerful since 'Lola'." In the UK, Allan Jones in Melody Maker praised the album, saying, that Sleepwalker "emphatically testifies to the dramatic artistic revival of Raymond Douglas Davies, whose supreme talents as a writer have been so distressingly overlooked during the first half of [the 1970s]. [Sleepwalker] really is the group's strongest and most organised album in years." Giovanni Dadomo of Sounds was less approving, saying, "it's not the great new album one always hopes for."

Two of the previously unreleased songs from Sleepwalker sessions were later included on the 1994 EP Waterloo Sunset '94: "Elevator Man" and "On the Outside".

Sleepwalker was remastered and reissued on CD in 1998 with bonus tracks: the B-sides "Prince of the Punks" and "Artificial Light", the version of "On the Outside" from Waterloo Sunset '94 EP and previously unreleased "The Poseur" and original mix of "On the Outside".

== Track listing ==
All tracks are written by Ray Davies.

Side one
No.	Title	Length
1.	"Life on the Road"	5:02
2.	"Mr. Big Man"	3:49
3.	"Sleepwalker"	4:04
4.	"Brother"	5:28

Side two
No.	Title	Length
1.	"Juke Box Music"	5:32
2.	"Sleepless Night"	3:18
3.	"Stormy Sky"	3:58
4.	"Full Moon"	3:52
5.	"Life Goes On"	5:03

CD reissue bonus tracks
No.	Title	Length
10.	"Artificial Light"	3:27
11.	"Prince of the Punks"	3:18
12.	"The Poseur"	2:53
13.	"On the Outside" (1977 Mix)	5:07
14.	"On the Outside" (1994 Mix)	5:20

== Personnel ==
The Kinks

- Ray Davies – lead and backing vocals, guitar and keyboards
- Dave Davies – lead guitar, backing and harmony vocals, lead vocals on "Sleepless Night", co-lead vocals on "Juke Box Music"
- John Dalton – bass guitar (except "Mr. Big Man".)
- John Gosling – keyboards and backing vocals
- Mick Avory – drums, percussion

Additional musicians

- Andy Pyle – bass on "Mr. Big Man"

Technical

- Roger Wake – engineer
- James Wedge – photography
- Bob Heimall – design
- John Dyer – art direction
- Hal Fiedler – calligraphy
