= Living on a Thin Line =

Single by The Kinks

from the album Word of Mouth
- B-side: "Sold Me Out"
- Released: January 1985
- Recorded: 1984
- Studio: Konk Studios, London
- Genre: New wave
- Length: 4:16
- Label: Arista
- Songwriter: Dave Davies
- Producer: Ray Davies

The Kinks singles chronology
"Do It Again" (1984)	"Living on a Thin Line" (1985)	"How Are You" (1986)

"Living on a Thin Line" is a track written by Dave Davies and performed by the Kinks on their 1984 album, Word of Mouth.

== Background ==
"Living on a Thin Line" is one of two songs on Word of Mouth written by Dave Davies (the other being "Guilty"). In his biography Kink, Dave Davies said that the track was influenced by the Kinks' long and difficult career, along with his hatred of politicians. The song was also influenced by the deterioration of English identity in the 20th century and Davies' longing for a return to "days of old".

Dave Davies originally intended for his brother and Kinks frontman Ray to sing the song, but he declined.

== Release ==
"Living on a Thin Line" was first released on Word Of Mouth, but has since been released as a 12-inch promotional radio single (backed with "Sold Me Out") in America, and on numerous compilation albums, such as Come Dancing with the Kinks, Lost & Found (1986–1989), The Ultimate Collection, and Picture Book. The song has also been played live by both The Kinks and Dave Davies.

== Reception ==
"Living on a Thin Line" has been praised as one of Dave Davies's greatest songs. David Fricke of Rolling Stone said that "in 'Living on a Thin Line' – a dark variation on Ray's own death-of-England's-glory songs – brooding, goose-stepping chords and moping Pink Floyd synths underscore the desperate effectiveness of Dave's nervous croon." Robert Christgau said, in his review of Come Dancing with The Kinks, that the track is the "second-best" on the album (to "Come Dancing"), and "'There's no England now,' he opines, which explains a lot."

The track is featured three times in a 2001 episode of The Sopranos, titled "University". Sopranos producer Terence Winter has said that it is the series' most asked-about song. The song was also used during the credits in the series finale of the HBO series Vice Principals.
