= Moving Pictures (The Kinks song) =

Single by The Kinks

from the album Low Budget
- B-side: "In a Space"
- Released: 28 September 1979 (UK)
- Recorded: January – June 1979
- Genre: Pop rock, disco
- Length: 3:47
- Label: Arista
- Songwriter: Ray Davies
- Producer: Ray Davies

The Kinks singles chronology
"(Wish I Could Fly Like) Superman" (1979)	"Moving Pictures" (1979)	"Pressure" (1979)

Low Budget track listing
- 11 tracks Side one: 1. "Attitude"; 2. "Catch Me Now I'm Falling"; 3. "Pressure"; 4. "National Health"; 5. "(Wish I Could Fly Like) Superman"; Side two: 6. "Low Budget"; 7. "In a Space"; 8. "Little Bit of Emotion"; 9. "A Gallon of Gas"; 10. "Misery"; 11. "Moving Pictures"

"Moving Pictures" is the final track on the Kinks' 1979 album Low Budget. Like the other ten tracks on the album, it was written by Ray Davies.

== Lyrics and music ==
The lyrics of "Moving Pictures" focus on how life passes people by. It laments on how life is "always moving" and that "nothing in life is a permanent fixture". It then goes on to analyze life in general, with lines such as "we live, we die, no one knows why" and " life can sometimes not be very nice, but then you make your choice so you must pay the price." It then warns that "Life is only what you make out so make the verses rhyme and all the pieces fit, there isn't any time to make much sense of it, it soon fades away." It also makes mention of racial problems, with the line "black girls, white girls oh what a mixture, looking as pretty as a picture."

The track, like "(Wish I Could Fly Like) Superman" (the lead single from Low Budget), attempts a disco feel, with a steady drum beat opening the song. Also, like most Kinks tracks, Ray Davies handles the lead vocal, which is double tracked at certain points during the track. Like the bulk of the album, Moving Pictures was recorded at the Power Station, a studio located in New York City.

== Personnel ==
As per the credits given on Low Budget.

- Ray Davies - lead vocals, synthesizer, piano
- Dave Davies - lead guitar, backing vocals
- Jim Rodford - bass guitar, backing vocals
- Mick Avory - drums

== Release and reception ==
"Moving Pictures" was released as the second UK single from Low Budget, backed with "In a Space", a track also from Low Budget. It was not considered commercially successful, as it did not make a dent in the charts. The single was not released in either the United States or Continental Europe.

The track was considered "blandly reflective" by Rolling Stone. According to author Johnny Rogan, he described the track as a perspective of life seen through the eyes of an “impermanent film”. When released, Melody Maker described the track as "an amiable, proficient shuffle, but the lyrics hardly approach the timeless elliptical acuity of 1960s material like 'Fancy' or 'Wonder Boy'".
