= Lost and Found (The Kinks song) =

Single by The Kinks

from the album Think Visual
- B-side: "Killing Time"
- Released: 3 April 1987
- Recorded: January 1986 and June–August 1986 at Konk Studios, London
- Genre: Rock
- Length: 5:19
- Label: MCA
- Songwriter: Ray Davies
- Producer: Ray Davies

The Kinks singles chronology
"How Are You" (1986)	"Lost and Found" (1987)	"The Road" (1988)

"Lost and Found" is a song by the Kinks, released as the second single (third in the US) from their 1986 album Think Visual. It was written by the Kinks' primary songwriter, Ray Davies.

== Lyrics ==
The lyrics of "Lost and Found" were inspired by the recent Hurricane Gloria, which describe a New York City couple who lost each other when the hurricane was about to hit the area. "We're near the eye of the storm," the singer sings. "This is really heavy weather." However, just as "the hurricane [was] crossing the coast line," the couple "were lost and found, in the nick of time." The lovers say, "we beat the fear, we came through the storm [and] now it all seems clear. We were lost and found, standing here looking at the new frontier".

== Release and reception ==
"Lost and Found" was first released as the second track on the Think Visual album. It was released as a standalone single in both Britain (the second single from Think Visual) and America (the third single from Think Visual). Although it did not chart on the Billboard Hot 100 or UK Singles Chart, it did reach No. 37 on the US Mainstream Rock chart, matching the peak of "Rock 'n' Roll Cities" (also from Think Visual) on the same chart.

"Lost and Found", aside from its appearance on Think Visual, was featured on other albums as well. A live version of the song appeared on Live: The Road, and the studio version was featured as the title track of the 1991 compilation album Lost & Found (1986-1989) (an album which covered the highlights of the Kinks' tenure with MCA).

"Lost and Found" has generally received positive reviews from music critics. Rolling Stone's David Wild described the track as "a gorgeous ballad about a couple in New York City weathering their own storm as a hurricane sweeps across the coastline." Stephen Thomas Erlewine of AllMusic noted "Lost and Found" as a highlight from the Think Visual LP. Cash Box praised its melodicism.

=== Music video ===
A music video (starring the Kinks) was filmed to promote "Lost and Found". In the video, an orchestra performs the track with the members of the Kinks, as a film is displayed in the background. This video features Ray Davies in antique clothing. One of the instrument players catches the eye of Davies in this display, and enters the film to unite with him. Francine Brody is the woman cellist.
