= Sleepwalker (The Kinks song) =

Single by the Kinks

from the album Sleepwalker
- B-side: "Full Moon"
- Released: 18 March 1977
- Recorded: September–October 1976
- Studio: Konk, London
- Genre: Rock
- Length: 4:04
- Label: Arista
- Songwriter: Ray Davies
- Producer: Ray Davies

The Kinks singles chronology
"No More Looking Back" (1976)	"Sleepwalker" (1977)	"Juke Box Music" (1977)

"Sleepwalker" is a song by the Kinks, released in 1977 as the first single from their album Sleepwalker, on which it appears as the third track. It was written by Ray Davies.

== Background and recording ==
"Sleepwalker" was reportedly written about Ray Davies's move from London to New York City at the time. The insomniac Davies was then adapting to the 24-hour schedule of the busy city.

Recording for "Sleepwalker" began sometime between 22 and 30 September 1976, cut during the same week as "Sleepless Night" and "Life Goes On" (all three of which would later appear on the final Sleepwalker album). Both "Sleepwalker" and "Sleepless Night" had been recorded in lengthy, seven-minute versions, eventually resulting in the tracks being cut down for their final releases. Backing vocals for the song were added by Ray Davies, Dave Davies, and John Gosling on 11 October of that year.

== Lyrics and music ==
As the title suggests, "Sleepwalker" is sung from the perspective of a sleepwalker. In the lyrics, the singer claims that "when midnight comes around, [he'll] start to lose [his] mind," calling himself a "sleepwalker", "night stalker", "street walker", and a "night hawker". A break appears midway through the song, described as "Dylanesque" by Denise Sullivan of AllMusic.

== Release and reception ==
"Sleepwalker" was released as the first single from album of the same name. It charted in the American Hot 100 (peaking at #48), the first single from the Kinks to do so since "Apeman". It also hit #54 in Canada. NME stated, "Set to a backdrop highly reminiscent of the hallowed back-'em-up-shut-'em-down riffing of Phase 1 Kinks .. the main squeeze is that The Kinks are making good records again." Melody Maker's opinion of the song was mixed, stating "Kinks fans/lovers of 'Waterloo Sunset' won't find 'Sleepwalker' very satisfactory. Respect The Right Honorable Davies though one must, this isn't quite the leap back to form which was hoped for. Not for the chart." Cash Box said that its "classic rock guitar chords, and an infectious chorus are the pop hooks, and the execution is impeccable throughout." Record World said that it "should rekindle some of the singles action they were accustomed to during their mid -sixties chart reign." More recently, Denise Sullivan claimed that, in her review of "Sleepwalker", "it's the kitchen sink of rock & roll songs. With all the earmarks of a classic, it's amazing 'Sleepwalker' didn't chart Top 40."

"Sleepwalker" also appeared on the compilation album Come Dancing with The Kinks.

== Performances ==
To advertise the track, the Kinks performed "Sleepwalker" multiple times on television shows. The band lip-synched the track on an episode of The Mike Douglas Show (followed by an interview and live performance of "Celluloid Heroes") that aired on 8 February 1977. It was also performed on Saturday Night Live on 26 February 1977, following a medley of "You Really Got Me", "All Day and All of the Night", "A Well Respected Man", and "Lola".
