= A Gallon of Gas =

Single by The Kinks

from the album Low Budget
- B-side: "Low Budget"
- Released: 7 August 1979 (US)
- Recorded: January – June 1979
- Genre: Rock; hard rock; novelty
- Length: 3:49 (single version); 2:41 (album version)
- Label: Arista
- Songwriter: Ray Davies
- Producer: Ray Davies

The Kinks US singles chronology
"(Wish I Could Fly Like) Superman" (1979)	"A Gallon of Gas" (1979)	"Catch Me Now I'm Falling" (1979)

Low Budget track listing
- 11 tracks Side one: 1. "Attitude"; 2. "Catch Me Now I'm Falling"; 3. "Pressure"; 4. "National Health"; 5. "(Wish I Could Fly Like) Superman"; Side two: 6. "Low Budget"; 7. "In a Space"; 8. "Little Bit of Emotion"; 9. "A Gallon of Gas"; 10. "Misery"; 11. "Moving Pictures"

Alternative cover
- Japanese single sleeve

"A Gallon of Gas" is the ninth track from the Kinks' album, Low Budget. It was written by Ray Davies.

== Background ==
"A Gallon of Gas", like many songs by the Kinks from this period, tells of economic problems of the time, in this case the gas shortage. The singer laments about how he "can't buy a gallon of gas", even "for any amount of cash". Author Nick Hasted describes it as "a heavy electric blues."

== Release ==
The song was the second single released from Low Budget, and is one of two singles from the album to be released in America but not in Britain (the other being "Catch Me Now I'm Falling"). The single version was longer than the album version with extra verse. In addition to its release as a single in America, the single was also released in Japan that same year.

"A Gallon of Gas" also appears on the greatest hits albums Come Dancing with The Kinks and the live album To the Bone. An alternate edition of the song appears on Picture Book.

== Reception ==
Record World said it has "cool, cocky, British vocals observing an American crisis with plenty of wit and rocking rhythm." The track was praised by AllMusic as well as Rolling Stone, who said that "A Gallon of Gas" is "no great poetic achievement, but its slow, bluesy arrangement—meant, no doubt, to re-create the effect of a snail's pace gas line — heightens the good-natured irony of a situation in which drugs are easier to come by than gasoline." Hasted also refers to the song's humor in that it is easier to buy drugs than gas. Hasted further notes that Davies, who years earlier wrote "Apeman," a song about abandoning the city to live in the jungle, "can't disguise his pleasure" in the fact that without gas there are no planes in the sky or cars on the road so that "the air smells unnaturally clean." Rolling Stone Album Guide critic Rob Sheffield calls it an "embarrassing novelty." Critic Johnny Rogan commented on the song's comedy and wryness.
