= Juke Box Music =

Single by The Kinks

from the album Sleepwalker
- B-side: "Sleepless Night" (U.K.); "Life Goes On" (U.S.)
- Released: 3 June 1977
- Recorded: Begun 1976
- Genre: Rock
- Length: 5:32
- Label: Arista
- Songwriter: Ray Davies
- Producer: Ray Davies

The Kinks singles chronology
"Sleepwalker" (1977)	"Juke Box Music" (1977)	"Father Christmas" (1977)

"Juke Box Music" is a track from the Kinks' 1977 album, Sleepwalker. It was one of the first tracks recorded in the Kinks' Konk recording complex. The song was also performed for The Old Grey Whistle Test in 1977.

== Background ==
Kinks frontman and songwriter Ray Davies described the song as being about "a girl who listens to the juke box all day and really believes all the lyrics. People like me write lots of lyrics and she really believes it." "Juke Box Music" is about a music fan who believes in the lyrics of the songs that she plays repeatedly on the juke box. David Levesley of GQ called the song a "fresh take" on the female archetype in American rock 'n' roll culture, writing, "While this woman is obsessed with the romance and heightened emotions of music, it leads to everyone else wondering why she distances herself from reality." Rolling Stone says that the topic "should be a pathetic song, yet Davies has us tapping our feet, singing along."

== Release ==
"Juke Box Music" was released as the second single from the band's 1976 Sleepwalker album, backed with "Sleepless Night" in the UK and Germany and with "Life Goes On" in the US. Despite the moderate commercial success of the band's previous single, it did not chart. "Juke Box Music" has since appeared on the Arista compilation album Come Dancing with The Kinks. It also gets the rare airplay on SiriusXM's Classic Rewind channel as well.

== Reception ==
"Juke Box Music" has been positively reviewed by many critics. Robert Christgau recommended the track in his review of the Sleepwalker album, and Rolling Stone claimed that it "is the best song [on Sleepwalker]." AllMusic called the track "exceptional", and said it was "yet another impressionistic portrait by the Kinks' Ray Davies".

GQ's Levesley named the song on his list of "sixteen The Kinks songs that soundtracked England perfectly," writing, "Even here, in a song that feels like very old-school Kinks, they manage to do something fresh thanks to Davies' idiosyncratic look at the world."
