= Catch Me Now I'm Falling =

Single by the Kinks

from the album Low Budget
- B-side: "Low Budget"
- Released: 5 September 1979 (US)
- Recorded: January – June 1979
- Genre: Rock; hard rock
- Length: 5:58 (album version); 4:02 (single version)
- Label: Arista
- Songwriter: Ray Davies
- Producer: Ray Davies

The Kinks US singles chronology
"A Gallon of Gas" (1979)	"Catch Me Now I'm Falling" (1979)	"Lola (live)" (1980)

Low Budget track listing
- 11 tracks Side one: 1. "Attitude"; 2. "Catch Me Now I'm Falling"; 3. "Pressure"; 4. "National Health"; 5. "(Wish I Could Fly Like) Superman"; Side two: 6. "Low Budget"; 7. "In a Space"; 8. "Little Bit of Emotion"; 9. "A Gallon of Gas"; 10. "Misery"; 11. "Moving Pictures"

Alternative cover
- American single label

"Catch Me Now I'm Falling" is a song written by Ray Davies and first released by the Kinks as the second track on their 1979 album Low Budget. Written as a criticism of America's allies, the song depicts the fall of Captain America as a symbol of the United States' dire circumstances at the time. The song features multiple solos on different instruments as well as a riff similar to "Jumpin' Jack Flash".

The song saw single release in the United States and in the Netherlands. In the US it had "Low Budget" on the B-side, while in the Netherlands the B-side was 'In a Space'. The song has since made appearances on compilations and live albums.

== Background ==
Like many of the other tracks on "Low Budget", "Catch Me Now I'm Falling" addresses then-current events. In this case the song shows lead singer Ray Davies portraying America in its time of need, with the lyrics criticizing both the US and its allies that refuse to help it. Author Nick Hasted describes it as sounding as if "it could be a distress call from the last embattled radio station in an occupied land." Hasted also notes that it invoked memories of the United States' aid to Europe via the Marshall Plan to criticize countries that were not helping the country in its time of need. While another song on Low Budget invokes DC Comics hero Superman, "Catch Me Now I'm Falling" calls to Marvel Comics hero Captain America.

The riff is similar to those on the Rolling Stones' "Jumpin' Jack Flash". The song includes a saxophone solo that Billboard described as "hot", as well as a guitar solo by Dave Davies. Cash Box said the song was "topical" with "a hypnotic blues-rock beat", summarizing the song as "good natured pop with a message". Record World called it "a vintage Kinks rocker complete with raging guitar lines and a bulldozer rhythm."

== Release and reception ==
The song was one of two U.S. only singles taken from Low Budget (the other being "A Gallon of Gas") to be released. Despite being an FM radio hit, the song failed to chart on the Billboard Hot 100. It also appeared on the compilation album Come Dancing with the Kinks and in live form on the album One for the Road.

Hasted praises "Catch Me Now I'm Falling" for perfectly summing up the mood in the United States at the time "with a brilliant broad stroke". Clive Davis, head of the Kinks' label at the time Arista Records, described the song as tapping "the malaise at the tail end of the decade." Music critic Johnny Rogan described the song as being "perfect" for live stadium shows. Billboard described the song as "sweeping" and "destined to become a favorite with fans" and rated it one of the top tracks from Low Budget. It also described the song as a "standout", praising its "strong vocals and lyrics" and "neat saxophone work" while describing the guitar riff as being influenced by the Rolling Stones. Author Bob Cianci described it as an "FM radio hit". But music critic Robert Christgau criticizes the song for lacking irony. Rolling Stone Album Guide critic Rob Sheffield calls it an "embarrassing novelty".

== Personnel ==
The Kinks

- Ray Davies – lead vocals
- Dave Davies – lead guitar
- Mick Avory – drums
- Jim Rodford – bass guitar

Additional personnel

- Nick Newall – saxophone
