= Francine Brody =

British actress, photographer and book editor

Francine Brody is an actress, voiceover artist, photographer and book editor.

Brody has performed in UK performances of plays such as The Lion, the Witch and the Wardrobe, The Importance of Being Earnest and The Glass Menagerie. Her film and television acting work has included I Dreamed of Africa, Maigret ("The Hotel Majestic") and a video for the Kinks' song "Lost and Found".

She has recorded a number of audio books including The Lottery and Other Stories, Belle de Jour, Bridget Jones's Diary, Eden Close, The Weight of Water and Italian Fever: A Novel, which was nominated for an award by the Spoken Word Publishing Association (SWPA).

Francine Brody won RADA's Flora Robson Prize.

Brody is a contributor to Online Review London and the author of a number of short stories. Currently working as a freelance photographer, editor and voiceover artist, she was for six years an editorial manager and editor at Weidenfeld & Nicolson, part of the Orion Publishing Group, where she commissioned many award-winning books.

She is also a cellist, giving performances of chamber music and orchestral works. She lives in London with the author Cris Freddi and their son.
