= Misfits (The Kinks song) =

- American E.P.

Single by The Kinks

from the album Misfits
- A-side: "Black Messiah"
- Released: May 19, 1978
- Recorded: July 1977 – January 1978 at Konk Studios, London
- Genre: Soft rock
- Length: 4:41
- Label: Arista 210
- Songwriter: Ray Davies
- Producer: Ray Davies

The Kinks singles chronology
"Live Life" (1978)	"Black Messiah" / "Misfits" (1978)	"(Wish I Could Fly Like) Superman" (1979)

"Misfits" is the title track for the Kinks' 1978 album, Misfits. It was written by Ray Davies.

== Lyrics ==
The lyrics of "Misfits" detail the many so-called "losers" and "failures" who are "lost without a crowd yet [they] go [their] own way." It goes on to say that "You're a misfit, afraid of yourself, so you run away and hide" and that "you've been a misfit all your life." The lyrics, however, embrace these misfits, with lyrics such as "misfits are everywhere" and "why don't you join the crowd and come inside." "Yes it's true what they say, every dog has his day," Davies sings, suggesting that these misfits will have their time.

== Release and reception ==
Ray Davies said of the song's appeal, "I was trying not to be a hit machine - and we've certainly achieved that with a few albums. But we wanted to expand and find a new fan-base - and hopefully, we'd still be excited by the music. Things like "Misfits" and "A Rock 'n' Roll Fantasy" a bit later were attempts to do both; music we got a kick out of, and also improve the fan-base."

"Misfits" was first released on the album of the same name on May 19, 1978. Although it was not released as a single, it was used as the B-side to the Black Messiah single. It also served as the title track of an EP named "The Kinks Misfit Record".

"Misfits" has been often praised as one of the best songs on the album of the same name. Stephen Thomas Erlewine of AllMusic called the track "a classic outsider rallying cry" and labelled it as one of the two "touchstones" of the album. Rolling Stone's Ken Emerson said that "Misfits" is "a fitting introduction to the Kinks' most intimate album".

== American EP ==
"The Kinks Misfit Record" was the first American Kinks EP created, despite the unpopularity of EPs in the US. The EP features "Misfits" as well as "A Rock 'N' Roll Fantasy", "Black Messiah", and "Permanent Waves" (all from Misfits). Although "A Rock 'N' Roll Fantasy" was released as a single in the United States, the other three tracks made their non-album debut in America on the EP.

=== Track listing ===
All tracks written by Ray Davies.

Side one
No.	Title	Length
1.	"A Rock 'N' Roll Fantasy"	4:58
2.	"Black Messiah"	3:24

Side two
No.	Title	Length
3.	"Misfits"	4:19
4.	"Permanent Waves"	3:37
