= Give the People What They Want (The Kinks album) =

Studio album by the Kinks
- Released: 15 August 1981
- Recorded: May 1979–June 1981
- Studio: Konk (London)
- Genre: Power pop; hard rock
- Length: 41:09
- Label: Arista
- Producer: Ray Davies

The Kinks chronology
One for the Road (1980)	Give the People What They Want (1981)	State of Confusion (1983)

Singles from Give the People What They Want
- 1. "Better Things" Released: 19 June 1981 (UK) 28 November 1981 (US); 2. "Destroyer" Released: 28 September 1981 (US); 3. "Predictable" Released: 30 October 1981 (UK)

Professional ratings
Review scores
Source	Rating
AllMusic	3/5 stars
Blender	4/5 stars
Robert Christgau	C+
Rolling Stone	4/5 stars

Give the People What They Want is the nineteenth studio album by the English rock band the Kinks. It was released on 15 August 1981, through Arista Records. Produced by Ray Davies, the album followed up the successful Low Budget (1979) and expanded on that record's hard rock style.

== Release ==
The initial release of the album in the UK was delayed because lead singer Ray Davies wanted to produce a full-length video for the album but financing fell through. Also scrapped were plans to remix the album for the European market.

Upon the reissue of the album on CD with the rest of the Kinks' six Arista studio albums, Give the People What They Want was the only one that did not contain bonus tracks, despite the existence of non-album tracks: the single version of "Better Things" was slightly longer than the album version (previously included on the Come Dancing with The Kinks compilation) and the British b-side of "Better Things" was a non-album track, "Massive Reductions", which was different from the version from the band's 1984 album Word of Mouth.

== Track listing ==
All tracks are written by Ray Davies.

Side one
No.	Title	Length
1.	"Around the Dial"	4:45
2.	"Give the People What They Want"	3:45
3.	"Killer's Eyes"	4:40
4.	"Predictable"	3:21
5.	"Add It Up"	3:14
Total length:		19:45

Side two
No.	Title	Length
1.	"Destroyer"	3:47
2.	"Yo-Yo"	4:10
3.	"Back to Front"	3:15
4.	"Art Lover"	3:22
5.	"A Little Bit of Abuse"	3:45
6.	"Better Things"	2:45
Total length:		21:18

== Personnel ==
The Kinks

- Ray Davies – guitar, keyboards, vocals
- Dave Davies – guitar, vocals
- Jim Rodford – bass
- Mick Avory – drums
- Ian Gibbons – keyboards

Additional personnel

- Chrissie Hynde – vocals on "Predictable", "Add It Up", "Art Lover" and "A Little Bit of Abuse" (uncredited)

Technical

- Ben Fenner – engineer
- Bob Ludwig – mastering engineer
- Robert Ellis – photography
