= Think Visual =

Studio album by the Kinks
- Released: 17 November 1986
- Recorded: January 1986 and June–August 1986
- Studios: Konk, London
- Genre: Rock
- Length: 44:22
- Labels: MCA (US); London (UK); Metronome (Germany)
- Producer: Ray Davies

The Kinks chronology
Word of Mouth (1984)	Think Visual (1986)	Live: The Road (1987)

Singles from Think Visual
- 1. "Rock 'n' Roll Cities" Released: 17 November 1986 (US); 2. "How Are You" Released: 22 December 1986 (UK); 3. "Lost and Found" Released: 9 February 1987

Professional ratings
Review scores
Source	Rating
AllMusic	2/5 stars
Blender	1/5 stars
Rolling Stone	(mixed)

Think Visual is the twenty-second studio album by the English rock band the Kinks, released in 1986. It peaked at No. 81 on the Billboard chart.

According to Ray Davies, the album was originally going to be a concept album where his "spiv" character from the "Come Dancing" music video was put in the "environment of a video shop".

== Track listing ==
All tracks are written by Ray Davies, except where noted.

Side one
No.	Title	Length
1.	"Working at the Factory"	2:58
2.	"Lost and Found"	5:19
3.	"Repetition"	4:06
4.	"Welcome to Sleazy Town"	3:50
5.	"The Video Shop"	5:15
Total length:		21:31

Side two
No.	Title	Writer(s)	Length
1.	"Rock 'n' Roll Cities"	Dave Davies	3:43
2.	"How Are You"		4:27
3.	"Think Visual"		3:12
4.	"Natural Gift"		3:44
5.	"Killing Time"		4:02
6.	"When You Were a Child"	D. Davies	3:40
Total length:			22:53

== Personnel ==
The Kinks

- Ray Davies – rhythm guitar, vocals, keyboards, harmonica
- Dave Davies – lead guitar, vocals, keyboards; lead vocals on "Rock 'n' Roll Cities" and "When You Were a Child"
- Ian Gibbons – keyboards, backing vocals
- Jim Rodford – bass guitar, backing vocals
- Bob Henrit – drums, percussion

Additional personnel

- Kim Goody – backing vocals on "Think Visual"
- Mick Avory – drums on "Rock 'n' Roll Cities"

Technical

- Ben Fenner – engineer
- Dave Powell – engineer
- David Baker – engineer
- Damian Korner – engineer

Cover design Design and photography by Icon: Richard Evans and Andrew Ellis
