= Misfits (The Kinks album) =

Studio album by the Kinks
- Released: 19 May 1978
- Recorded: July 1977 – January 1978
- Studio: Konk, London
- Genre: Rock; hard rock
- Length: 40:29
- Label: Arista
- Producer: Ray Davies

The Kinks chronology
Sleepwalker (1977)	Misfits (1978)	Low Budget (1979)

Singles from Misfits
- 1. "A Rock 'N' Roll Fantasy" Released: 5 May 1978; 2. "Live Life" Released: 14 July 1978; 3. "Black Messiah" Released: 29 September 1978 (UK)

Misfits is the seventeenth studio album by the English rock band the Kinks, released in 1978. Following the minor success of Sleepwalker in the United States, Misfits featured a more rock-oriented style than many other Kinks records of the 1970s. It was their last album to feature pianist John Gosling and the only one to feature bassist Andy Pyle as a member, both of whom quit the band following internal conflicts. Despite this, the album made the Top 40 in America. The album also contained the minor hit single "A Rock 'n' Roll Fantasy", as well as less successful releases "Live Life" and "Black Messiah".

== Background ==
Misfits was the second album by the Kinks recorded for Arista Records, the record company the band switched to from RCA Records in 1976, and continued the band's commercial comeback in the US.

For Misfits Andy Pyle replaced longtime bassist John Dalton who quit the band during the recording of Sleepwalker.

== Recording ==
The album was recorded at Konk Studios in London following the band's tumultuous 1977 tour. Several of the album's songs, such as "Hay Fever", "In a Foreign Land", and "Black Messiah", were leftovers from the band's previous 1977 album, Sleepwalker. "In a Foreign Land" (which featured Dalton on bass), specifically, was in the planned running order until late in recording. Instead it was replaced with the late addition "Mr. Big Man".

Due to conflicts between Ray Davies and Andy Pyle, the latter began contemplating leaving the band. Gosling, also wanting to leave the band since Dalton's resignation, began to work with Pyle over plans to form another band. However, when Ray Davies caught wind of the project, he began to intervene. Gosling remembered, "We [me and Pyle] rehearsed and held auditions at the Bridge House pub in Canning Town. It was exhilarating, like starting over. But Ray somehow found out and started giving me a hard time during my last overdub sessions for Misfits." Per Dave Davies, the band had practically disbanded:

At the time of Misfits the band, as it was, had broken up. ... Music isn't glamorous. For most of the time, you are faced with horrible people. You do meet some beautiful, creative, talented people but there’s also a lot of shit there. In the period of Misfits, we thought, 'Why the hell are we doing this now?'

After recording was done both Pyle and Gosling departed for good. Zaine Griff and Ron Lawrence did bass overdubs for some songs. In addition, founding drummer Mick Avory also considered leaving, and became a less active participant, leaving Dave Davies's friend Nick Trevisick to drum on three songs and session drummer Clem Cattini to do overdubs. However, Avory stayed with the band until 1984.

== Release and reception ==
Professional ratings
Review scores
Source	Rating
AllMusic	4.5/5 stars
Blender	3/5 stars
Christgau's Record Guide	B
The Encyclopedia of Popular Music	4/5 stars

Although it was unable to chart in Britain, Misfits reached No. 40 in America. The debut single from the album, "A Rock 'n' Roll Fantasy", was also a minor hit in the US, reaching No. 30. Follow-up singles "Live Life" and "Black Messiah" (the latter a British-only release), however, failed to make an impact.

Rolling Stone wrote: "Thanks to Ray Davies, Misfits is very nearly a masterpiece because it anatomizes rather than glorifies Davies' role as 'One of the Survivors', as the Kinks sang five years ago."

== Track listing ==
All tracks are written by Ray Davies, except "Trust Your Heart" by Dave Davies.

Side one
No.	Title	Length
1.	"Misfits"	4:41
2.	"Hay Fever"	3:32
3.	"Black Messiah"	4:08
4.	"A Rock 'n' Roll Fantasy"	4:58
5.	"In a Foreign Land"	3:03

Side two
No.	Title	Length
1.	"Permanent Waves"	3:47
2.	"Live Life"	4:47
3.	"Out of the Wardrobe"	3:35
4.	"Trust Your Heart"	4:11
5.	"Get Up"	3:22

Bonus tracks (CD reissues)
No.	Title	Length
11.	"Black Messiah" (single remix)	3:37
12.	"Father Christmas"	3:42
13.	"A Rock & Roll Fantasy" (US single edit)	4:01
14.	"Live Life" (US single remix)	3:47

Note: Many non-UK pressings of the album swap the positions of "Live Life" and "Black Messiah", as well as using an edited version of "Live Life" running 3:12. However, the 1998 CD reissue, among other select pressings, uses the UK track listing.

== Personnel ==
The Kinks

- Ray Davies – vocals, guitar, piano, synthesizer
- Dave Davies – backing vocals, lead guitar, lead vocals on "Trust Your Heart"
- Mick Avory – drums and percussion (except "A Rock & Roll Fantasy", "Trust Your Heart", and "Get Up")
- John Gosling – piano, organ, synthesizer
- Andy Pyle – bass guitar (except "Rock and Roll Fantasy", "In A Foreign Land", "Live Life" and "Get Up")
- John Dalton – bass guitar on "In A Foreign Land"

Other musicians

- Nick Trevisik – drums on "A Rock & Roll Fantasy", "Trust Your Heart", and "Get Up"
- Ron Lawrence – bass guitar on "Rock and Roll Fantasy", "Live Life" and "Get Up"
- Zaine Griff – bass guitar overdubs
- Clem Cattini – drum overdubs
- John Beecham – trombone on "Black Messiah"
- Nick Newall – clarinet on "Black Messiah"
- Mike Cotton – trumpet on "Black Messiah"

Production

- Written and Produced by Raymond Douglas Davies
- Engineered by Steve Waldman
- Photography – James Wedge
