= How Are You =

Single by The Kinks

from the album Think Visual
- B-side: "Killing Time" (UK); "Working at the Factory" (US)
- Released: 22 December 1986
- Recorded: January 1986 and June–August 1986 at Konk Studios, London
- Genre: Rock
- Length: 4:27
- Label: MCA / Davray Music Ltd.
- Songwriter: Ray Davies
- Producer: Ray Davies

The Kinks singles chronology
"Rock 'n' Roll Cities" (1986)	"How Are You" (1986)	"Lost and Found" (1987)

"How Are You" is the seventh track on the album, Think Visual, released by the Kinks in 1986. It was written by Ray Davies.

== Recording ==
The initial demo of "How Are You" was recorded in January 1986 at Konk Studios. Ray Davies liked his vocals on the demo so much that he transferred the vocals from the demo to Konk Studios' 24-track machine. He then worked on the instrumental to center around the demo's vocal.

== Lyrics and music ==
In "How Are You", the singer reminisces with an old friend he has run into. "It's been a while, I haven't seen you for at least a year or more, or is it less? I can't be sure," the singer says. He then asks, "How are you?" The singer continues to question his friend, asking "Are you still dreaming and making big plans? How are the nights are they still lonely? Are you still struggling the way that I am?" However, the meeting begins to turn sour, with the singer saying, "I know you're making all the same mistakes", but then adds, "Still no offence, no more hard feelings left on silly sentiment. No harm was ever felt or ever meant." He then realizes that he has to leave, as he's "gotta thousand little things I better do. Ah, but it was really good to talk to you. Be on my way, I'm bound to see you on the street again someday, and when I do I'll say How are you?" The reuniting theme of "How Are You" is also apparent in its follow-up single, "Lost and Found". "How Are You", like most Kinks tracks, is sung by Ray Davies. The track also, like many others on Think Visual, makes use of synthesizers.

== Release and reception ==
"How Are You" was first released in November 1986 on the Think Visual LP. However, one month later, "How Are You" was released as the first UK single from the album, backed with "Killing Time". It was a minor success, peaking at No. 86 on the UK Singles Chart. This would be the last time that a Kinks single charted in Britain. Although the Dave Davies-penned "Rock 'n' Roll Cities" was chosen to be the lead Think Visual single in America, "How Are You" was eventually released as its follow-up, this time backed with "Working at the Factory". In the U.S., AOR disc jockeys flipped the single over and played "Working at the Factory" as though it was the second single. It reached No. 16 on Billboard's Album Rock Tracks chart.

In his review of Think Visual, David Wild of Rolling Stone wrote, "the melancholy 'How Are You' is another of Ray's well-crafted songs of love and loss."

The track also appeared on the compilation album, Picture Book.

=== Music video ===
Like many other Kinks singles of the 1980s, a promotional video for "How Are You" was filmed, featuring Ray Davies. Unusually, the video "How Are You" (as well as those for the two other singles from Think Visual) was not directed by Julien Temple, who had directed all of their music videos since "Predictable".
