= A Rock 'n' Roll Fantasy =

Single by The Kinks

from the album Misfits
- B-side: "Artificial Light" (U.K.); "Live Life" (U.S.); "Get Up" (Canada)
- Released: 5 May 1978
- Recorded: July 1977 – January 1978 at Konk Studios, London
- Genre: Rock
- Length: 4:58
- Label: Arista 189 (U.K.); Arista AS 0342 (U.S.)
- Songwriter: Ray Davies
- Producer: Ray Davies

The Kinks singles chronology
"Father Christmas" (1977)	"A Rock 'n' Roll Fantasy" (1978)	"Live Life" (1978)

"A Rock 'n' Roll Fantasy" is the lead single and fourth track from the Kinks' 1978 album Misfits. Written by Ray Davies, the song was inspired by the band's then-tumultuous state at the time, with two members leaving the band during the recording of Misfits. Released as the first single from the album, the track was the band's most successful single in years, reaching number 30 on the Billboard Hot 100 in the U.S.

== Background ==
During the recording of the Misfits album, bassist Andy Pyle and pianist John Gosling quit the band, and drummer Mick Avory also considered leaving. Following the departures, Ray and Dave Davies got together and spent time with each other, which resulted in the writing of both "A Rock 'n' Roll Fantasy" (Ray) and "Trust Your Heart" (Dave).

It took nearly a year to put [Misfits] together, a couple of band members left, and Mick [Avory] didn't really want to do it. And [Ray and I] got together like we had so many times before, playing Chuck Berry records, having a laugh. And two songs came out of it, '[A] Rock 'n' Roll Fantasy' and 'Trust Your Heart,' which pulled the record together. That could very easily have been the end of [the band]. But there was something not yet resolved.

— Dave Davies

Ray Davies has since said, "'A Rock 'n' Roll Fantasy' [is] a very personal song about Dave and I." He has also claimed that the song was inspired by both a Peter Frampton concert he'd attended and the death of rock 'n' roll legend Elvis Presley in August of 1977. He said, "It's a Method acting songwriting job. I use personal things to get something else out of me... Elvis Presley died last week and it all just added up." Dave said of the song, "It challenged the fact that the music business was in any way glamourous. [Ray] asked if we should carry on amongst the bullshit."

== Lyrics ==
The lyrics of "A Rock 'n' Roll Fantasy" describe a man named Dan who is a huge fan of the Kinks. He engulfs himself in their music whenever he feels unhappy, "living in a rock 'n' roll fantasy". The song also details when Ray Davies and his brother Dave were thinking of breaking up the Kinks. This is evident in lyrics such as "break up the band, start a new life be a new man."

== Release and reception ==
I was trying not to be a hit machine - and we've certainly achieved that with a few albums. But we wanted to expand and find a new fan-base - and hopefully, we'd still be excited by the music. Things like "Misfits" and "A Rock 'n' Roll Fantasy" a bit later were attempts to do both; music we got a kick out of, and also improve the fan-base.

— Ray Davies

The track was chosen as the first single release from Misfits, and was backed with "Artificial Light" in Britain, and "Live Life" in the US. It peaked at No. 30 on the Billboard Hot 100 in America, the band's best charting American single since "Lola" in 1970. It also reached No. 30 on the charts in Canada.

The track is generally cited by critics as one of the highlights of Misfits. Stephen Thomas Erlewine of AllMusic called it one of two "touchstones" on the album. Ken Emerson of Rolling Stone called the song "ruthless", and went on to say:

It's a twofold fantasy: that of Davies, who'll "break up the band, start a new life, be a new man," and that of a diehard Kinks fan, Dan, who's wrapped up in their records. At its lovely beginning, the song suggests a breathy ballad by the Bee Gees, another veteran group but one that, unlike the Kinks, is now enjoying greater commercial success than ever before. As the lyrics describe Dan's rapt devotion, billowing harmonies deliberately evoke the Beach Boys, a band that seems to have soldiered on only for the sake of nostalgia. Then, as this description reaches its climax, the Kinks burst into an approximation of the sound of Boston's dense, swirling guitars. (If Boston can scarcely get it together to record a second LP, imagine how the Kinks, whose success was equally over-night, feel as they approach their twenty-second or so!)

Cash Box noted the song's "excellent melodic line, strong guitar work and fine lead vocals." Record World said, "The production is sensational and Davies' vocals perfectly suit the somewhat jaded message in the lyrics."

As one of the band's significant late-'70s hits, the song would later appear on the compilation album Come Dancing with The Kinks.
