= You Really Got Me =

1964 single by the Kinks

- Dutch single sleeve

Single by the Kinks

from the album Kinks
- B-side: "It's All Right"
- Released: 4 August 1964
- Recorded: 13 July 1964
- Studio: IBC, London
- Genre: Garage rock; proto-punk; hard rock; proto-metal
- Length: 2:20
- Label: Pye (UK); Reprise (US)
- Songwriter: Ray Davies
- Producer: Shel Talmy

The Kinks UK singles chronology
"You Still Want Me" (1964)	"You Really Got Me" (1964)	"All Day and All of the Night" (1964)

Official audio
- "You Really Got Me" on YouTube

The Kinks US singles chronology
"Long Tall Sally" (1964)	"You Really Got Me" (1964)	"All Day and All of the Night" (1964)

"You Really Got Me" is a song by the English rock band the Kinks, written by frontman Ray Davies and released as their third single in 1964. The song was the Kinks' breakthrough hit, establishing them as one of the top British Invasion acts in the United States. The song's novel use of power chords and distortion heavily influenced later rock musicians, particularly in the heavy metal and punk rock genres.

Built around a guitar riff played by Dave Davies in perfect fifths and octaves, the song was originally performed in a more blues-oriented style inspired by artists such as Lead Belly and Big Bill Broonzy. Davies described its lyrics as "a love song for street kids". Two versions were recorded, with the second performance used for the final single. Dave Davies performs the song's guitar solo; a debunked rumour held that it was performed by future Led Zeppelin guitarist Jimmy Page.

The song was released in the UK on 4 August 1964 by Pye Records as the group's third single, and reached number one on the Record Retailer chart the following month, remaining there for two weeks. It was released in the US on 2 September by Reprise Records, reaching number seven. The following month, the song appeared on the Kinks' debut album, Kinks. American rock band Van Halen covered the song on their 1978 eponymous debut album; it was released as their first single and peaked at No. 36 on the Billboard Hot 100.

== Background ==
[The original demo version of 'You Really Got Me'] had very way-out words and a funny sort of ending that didn't. We did it differently on the record because [this original version] was really rather uncommercial.

— Ray Davies

"You Really Got Me" was written by Ray Davies, the Kinks' vocalist and main songwriter, sometime between 9 and 12 March 1964. Created on the piano in the front room of the Davies' home, the song was stylistically very different from the finished product, being much lighter and somewhat jazz-oriented. Ray said of the song's writing, "When I came up with ['You Really Got Me'] I hadn't been writing songs very long at all. It was one of the first five I ever came up with."

Davies said that he had been inspired to write the song one night during his college days playing with the Dave Hunt Band, when he saw an attractive girl on the dance floor. He said: "When we finished, I went off to find her, but she was gone and never returned to the club. She really got me going."

During the spring of 1964, Ray Davies played an early version of "You Really Got Me" on the piano to rock photographer Allan Ballard during a photo shoot. Ballard later remembered, "It was quite a small, pokey, Victorian Terrace, a bit scruffy, and in the hallway they had an upright piano. Ray sat down and plonked out, 'Der-der, der, Der-der!' He said, 'What do you reckon to this?' It meant nothing to me at the time, but it ended up as 'You Really Got Me'."

Ray, initially planning for the song to be a "more laid-back number", later played the chords of the song to brother Dave Davies, the Kinks' lead guitarist. However, upon hearing the track, Dave decided that the riff would be much more powerful on a guitar. Ray said of the track's change to a guitar-centred track, "I wanted it to be a jazz-type tune, because that's what I liked at the time. It's written originally around a sax line ... Dave ended up playing the sax line in fuzz guitar and it took the song a step further." The band began performing the new track in some of their live shows, where it was well received.

In 1998, Ray said, "I'd written 'You Really Got Me' as tribute to all those great blues people I love: Lead Belly and Big Bill Broonzy." Dave cited Gerry Mulligan as an inspiration, saying, "Ray was a great fan of Gerry Mulligan, who was in [the Jazz on a Summer's Day movie], and as he sat at the piano at home, he sort of messed around in a vein similar to Mulligan and came up with this figure based on a 12-bar blues". Dave has also said that song had been inspired by Jimmy Giuffre's song "The Train and the River". According to the band's manager, Larry Page, the song's characteristic riff came about while working out the chords of the Kingsmen's "Louie Louie". Lyrically, the song was said to be influenced by an encounter with one of the band's "first serious female fans".

== Recording ==
When I first heard ["You Really Got Me"], I said, "Shit, it doesn't matter what you do with this, it's a number one song". It could have been done in waltz time and it would have been a hit.

— Shel Talmy, producer of "You Really Got Me"

The Kinks recorded "You Really Got Me" at least twice in mid-1964, on 24 June and 13 July. The band's demo was in a "bluesy" style, while a full studio version recorded in June was slower and less emphatic than the final single. Shel Talmy had, according to Davies, covered the track in reverb, all but burying the lead guitar. The band wanted to rerecord the song, but their record company Pye refused to fund another session on the grounds that the band's first two singles had failed to chart. Ray Davies, however, threatened that he would refuse to perform or promote the single unless it was re-recorded. Manager Larry Page also refused to publish the original recording. When Pye stood its ground, the band's own management broke the stalemate by funding the session themselves. Ray Davies' adamant attitude on behalf of the career-making song effectively established him as the leader and chief songwriter of the Kinks. Davies later said, "I was floundering around trying to find an identity. It was in 1964 that I managed to do that, to be able to justify myself and say, 'I exist, I'm here.' I was literally born when that song hit."

The influential distortion sound of the guitar track was created after guitarist Dave Davies sliced the speaker cone of his guitar amplifier with a razor blade and poked it with a pin. The amplifier was affectionately called "little green", after the name of the amplifier made by the Elpico company, and purchased in Davies' neighbourhood music shop, linked to a Vox AC-30. In 2014, Dave Davies accused brother Ray of lying about participating in Dave's guitar distortion sound. Dave wrote on his Facebook page, "My brother is lying. I don't know why he does this but it was my Elpico amp that I bought and out of frustration I cut the speaker cone up with a razor blade and I was so shocked and surprised and excited that it worked that I demonstrated the sound to Ray and [Kinks bassist] Pete [Quaife] ... Ray liked the sound and he had written a riff on the piano which formed the basis of the song 'You Really Got Me' and I played the riff on my guitar with my new sound. I alone created this sound."

According to recent Kinks' releases that give full official performance credits of the track, group members Ray Davies (vocals and rhythm guitar), Dave Davies (lead guitar), Pete Quaife (bass) are joined by session men Bobby Graham (drums), and Arthur Greenslade (piano). Regular Kinks drummer Mick Avory plays the tambourine.

== Guitar solo ==
The guitar solo on the recording has been the subject of the persistent myth that it was not played by the Kinks' lead guitarist Dave Davies, but by then-session player Jimmy Page, who later joined the Yardbirds and Led Zeppelin. Among those claiming Page played lead guitar was Jon Lord of Deep Purple, who also claimed to play piano on the track. Page has always denied playing the song's guitar solo, going so far as to say in a 1970s interview cited in Sound on Sound magazine, "I didn't play on 'You Really Got Me' and that's what pisses him [Ray Davies] off." Rock historian and author Doug Hinman makes a case that the rumour was begun and fostered by the established British rhythm and blues community, many of whose members were resentful that an upstart band of teenagers such as the Kinks could produce such a powerful and influential blues-based recording seemingly out of nowhere.

Shel Talmy, the producer on the track, put the controversy to rest in an interview with The Guardian, saying, "contrary to myth, Jimmy didn't play on 'You Really Got Me'." In a 7 November 2014 interview with SiriusXM's Town Hall series, Page confirmed again that he did not play on the song, saying "Oh, Crikey! I wasn't on 'You Really Got Me,' but I did play on the Kinks' records. That's all I'm going to say about it. But every time I do an interview, people ask me about 'You Really Got Me.' So maybe somebody can correct Wikipedia so people won't keep asking me." Drummer Mick Avory also confirmed that the guitar solo was played by Dave Davies and not Jimmy Page in an interview with AllMusic in 2023.

In his 1998 autobiographical release The Storyteller, Ray Davies discusses the guitar solo. He confirms that his brother Dave played the solo and it was preceded by some bantering between the two:

Halfway through the song it was time for Dave's guitar solo. This moment had to be right. So I shouted across the studio to Dave, give him encouragement. But I seemed to spoil his concentration. He looked at me with a dazed expression. 'Fuck off.' If you doubt me, if you doubt what I'm saying, I challenge you to listen to the original Kinks recording of 'You Really Got Me'. Halfway through the song, after the second chorus, before the guitar solo, there's a drum break. Boo ka, boo boo ka, boo ka, boo boo. And in the background you can hear 'fuck off'. You can, you can. When I did the vocal I tried to cover it up by going 'Oh no', but in the background you still hear it 'fuck off'. And it's even clearer on CD, it's really embarrassing.

== Music and lyrics ==
Every aspect of the song's construction is governed by the riff, a rapid alteration of bass notes a whole tone apart ... this element probably accounts almost single-handedly for the song's popularity.

— Matthew Gelbart, musicologist

Commentators have described "You Really Got Me" as garage rock, hard rock, rock and roll, and proto-punk. While Ray Davies had been instructed at the time to write "Beatle-type" material for commercial reasons, "You Really Got Me" was written as a more R&B-based composition. The song is centred on a guitar riff that has been called "instantly identifiable". American musicologist Robert Walser described "You Really Got Me" as "the first hit song built around power chords."

The song has been labeled an early influence of the heavy metal genre, with critic Denise Sullivan of AllMusic writing, "'You Really Got Me' remains a blueprint song in the hard rock and heavy metal arsenal." Dave Davies has rejected the idea that the song is heavy metal, saying: "I've never really like that term, heavy metal. I think, in all humility, it was the first heavy guitar riff rock record. Just because of the sound—if you played it on a ukulele, it might not have been so powerful."

The lyrics of the song are about lust and sex. Dave Davies said of the song's lyrics, "'You Really Got Me' [is] such a pure record, really. It's a love song for street kids. They're not going to wine and dine you, even if they knew how to chat you up. [They say] 'I want you—come here.'"

Audio sample

== Release and reception ==
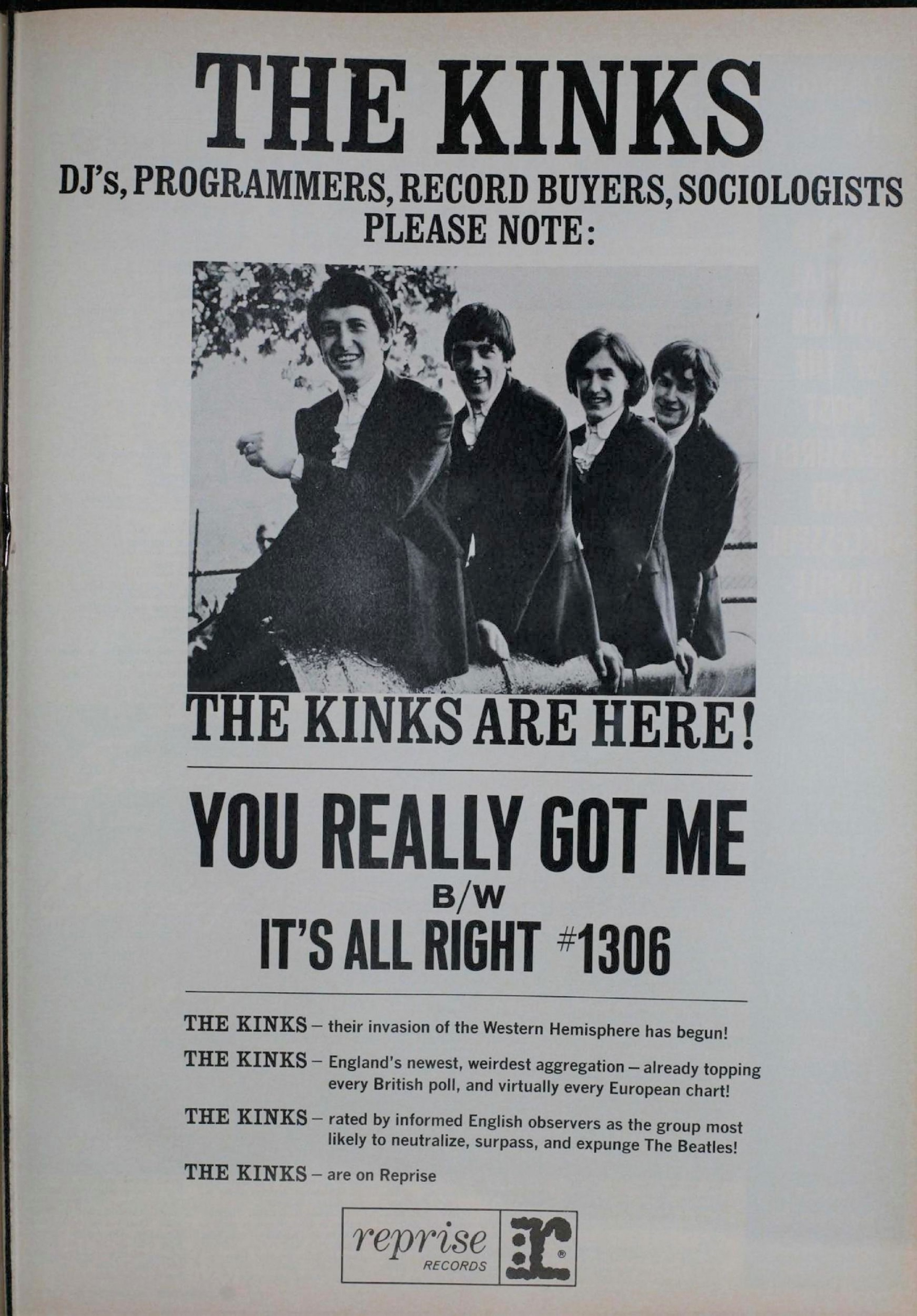
Billboard advertisement, September 5, 1964

"You Really Got Me" was released as the band's third single on 4 August 1964, backed with "It's All Right" (also spelled "It's Alright"). Within three days of the single's release, "You Really Got Me" began to appear on local charts. Eventually, the song climbed to the top of the British charts, the band's first single to do so. Ray Davies later claimed that, due to the single's high demand, Pye Records put all their other records on hold to solely produce copies of "You Really Got Me". Due to the high level of success the single achieved in the UK, a rush-release of "You Really Got Me" was put out in the US on 2 September 1964, despite being delayed from its initial release date of 26 August. Although it did not enter the charts until 26 September, the record rose to number seven on the Billboard Hot 100.

The song later appeared on the band's debut album, Kinks, with the title of the American release of the album changed to You Really Got Me. Plans for Ray to sing versions of the song in French, German, Spanish, and Japanese for their respective markets were proposed by Shel Talmy but never materialised. The single B-side, "It's All Right", was included on the UK EP Kinksize Hits (1964). It was first issued on an album in the US, where it was included on the Kinks' third album Kinkdom (1965). Music writers have called the song "shockingly different" from the Kinks' recorded work up to this point, and a "frenetic lost gem". The song is included on a 1998 CD reissue of the group's debut album.

We were really surprised when 'You Really Got Me' was a hit. Why wasn't our last disc, 'You Still Want Me'? Because it wasn't any good. We didn't like it much ... We write for ourselves now.

— Ray Davies

Upon release, the single received a positive review from Record Mirror, which said, "Highly promising group with strong guitar sound and a compact sort of vocal performance. Mid-tempo but bustling song should sell well." In Melody Maker, singer Dave Berry was featured in a blindfold test of the song, with Berry at first guessing the song was by the Kingsmen. He said, "It's fabulous, this one. I like these records that sound as if they've gone into a recording studio and done what they wanted to on the spot. It's a good chance of being a big hit." The Melody Maker review had a lasting impact on Ray Davies, who said that Berry "had a few hits—so he mattered" and that Berry's belief that the band had "done what they wanted" had "said it all" for him. In the U.S., Cash Box called the single "a pulsating, blues-flavored rock-a-rhythmic...that builds along the way."

The Kinks' use of distorted guitar riffs continued with songs like "All Day and All of the Night", "Tired of Waiting for You", and "Set Me Free", among others. Pete Townshend of the Who, a band also produced by Talmy at that time, has stated that their first single, "I Can't Explain", was influenced by the Kinks' work at the time. Other artists influenced by "You Really Got Me" include Tom Petty, John Lydon, Joe Jackson, Chris Bell of Big Star, and Jimi Hendrix, who, according to Dave Davies, described the song as "a landmark record".

In 1999, "You Really Got Me" was inducted into the Grammy Hall of Fame. Rolling Stone magazine placed the song at number 82 on their list of the 500 greatest songs of all time and at number four on their list of the 100 Greatest Guitar Songs of All Time. In early 2005, the song was voted the best British song of the 1955–1965 decade in a BBC radio poll. In March 2005, Q magazine placed it at number nine in its list of the 100 Greatest Guitar Tracks. In 2009, it was named the 57th Greatest Hard Rock Song by VH1.

== Live history ==
"You Really Got Me (live)"

Single by the Kinks

from the album One for the Road
- B-side: "Attitude"
- Released: 29 October 1980
- Recorded: 6 March 1979
- Venue: Lowell Memorial Auditorium, Massachusetts
- Length: 3:35
- Label: Arista
- Songwriter: Ray Davies
- Producer: Ray Davies

The Kinks US singles chronology
"Lola (live)" (1980)	"You Really Got Me (live)" (1980)	"Destroyer" (1981)

Before its release, the Kinks performed "You Really Got Me" in some of their early concerts. It was a crowd favourite, with Ray Davies later claiming to feel a connection with the crowd as he performed the song. Ray later said, "Our success came from playing [the song] live. When we played 'You Really Got Me' people actually took notice. They realised we had something original."

The Kinks continued to perform successfully for over 30 years through many musical styles, but "You Really Got Me" remained a mainstay in concert. During some shows, the song was played in a medley with its follow-up single "All Day and All of the Night", while in 1977, a performance on Saturday Night Live featured a four-song medley of "You Really Got Me", "All Day and All of the Night", "A Well Respected Man", and "Lola". In a live performance on the Don Lane Show in 1982, "You Really Got Me" was featured in a medley with the band's 1981 song, "Destroyer". In 1984, Dave Davies claimed that, even after twenty years of performing "You Really Got Me", the track was "still fun to play live".

A live version of "You Really Got Me" was released on the band's 1980 live album, One for the Road. This version, following the minor success of the same album's live version of "Lola", was released as a single in America, backed with the live take of Low Budget's "Attitude". It failed to chart. This version was later included on the 1986 compilation album Come Dancing with the Kinks: The Best of the Kinks 1977–1986.

Other live renditions of "You Really Got Me" have also been released. A version on Live at Kelvin Hall recorded at Kelvin Hall in Glasgow, Scotland, was released in 1967, while a performance at the Mann Music Center in Philadelphia, Pennsylvania, appeared on 1994's To the Bone. The Davies brothers also performed a live version in Boston, Massachusetts with the Smithereens in November 1991, which later appeared on the latter band's 1995 compilation album Attack of the Smithereens.

In December 2015, Ray Davies joined Dave onstage at one of his concerts to perform "You Really Got Me". The event marked the first time the brothers performed on stage together in nearly 20 years, sparking rumours of a Kinks reunion.

== Personnel ==
According to Doug Hinman:

The Kinks

- Ray Davies – lead vocal, rhythm guitar
- Dave Davies – backing vocal, lead guitar
- Pete Quaife – backing vocal, bass guitar
- Mick Avory – tambourine

Additional musicians

- Bobby Graham – drums
- Arthur Greenslade – piano
- Harry Frayer – electric rhythm guitar

== Charts ==
=== Weekly charts ===
Chart (1964–1965)	Peak position
Australia	2
Belgium (Ultratop 50 Wallonia)	42
Canada Top Singles (RPM)	4
Finland (Suomen virallinen lista)	40
France (IFOP)	16
Germany (GfK)	39
New Zealand (Lever Hit Parade)	2
Sweden (Kvällstoppen)	11
Sweden (Tio i Topp)	8
Ireland (IRMA)	6
UK (Melody Maker)	1
UK (Record Retailer)	1
US Billboard Hot 100	7
US Cash Box Top 100	5

=== Year-end charts ===
Chart (1964)	Position
US Billboard Year-End	79

== Certifications ==
Region	Certification	Certified units/sales
Italy (FIMI)	Gold	50,000^{‡}
New Zealand (RMNZ)	Platinum	30,000^{‡}
Spain (Promusicae)	Gold	30,000^{‡}
United Kingdom (BPI)	Platinum	600,000^{‡}
^{‡} Sales+streaming figures based on certification alone.

== Van Halen version ==
"You Really Got Me"

Single by Van Halen

from the album Van Halen
- B-side: "Atomic Punk"
- Released: January 1978
- Recorded: September–October 1977
- Studio: Sunset Sound Recorders, Hollywood
- Genre: Hard rock; heavy metal
- Length: 2:35
- Label: Warner Bros.
- Songwriter: Ray Davies
- Producer: Ted Templeman

Van Halen singles chronology
"You Really Got Me" (1978)	"Runnin' with the Devil" (1978)

Audio sample
- file; help

Music videos
- "You Really Got Me" on YouTube

The American hard rock band Van Halen released a cover of "You Really Got Me" on its self-titled 1978 debut album. As the band's first single, it was a popular radio hit that helped jump-start the band's career. This version, which Eddie Van Halen called an "updated" version of the original, featured "histrionic" guitar playing by himself and "vocal shenanigans" by David Lee Roth. The song had been played by the band live for years before its studio release. On the radio, it is often featured with "Eruption", the instrumental that precedes it on the album, as an intro.

The song was released as a single as a result of an encounter between Van Halen and members of the band Angel. Van Halen and Angel drummer Barry Brandt had both been bragging about their new material to one another, resulting in Van Halen showing Brandt a demo of "You Really Got Me". The next day, the band's producer, Ted Templeman, told Van Halen that Angel was recording its own cover of "You Really Got Me" to release before Van Halen's version. As a result, the song was rush-released as a single before Angel could do so.

Record World said that it's a "supercharged, heavier version" than the Kinks' version and that "it's still a fine, primal rocker."

Eddie Van Halen later expressed dissatisfaction with the use of "You Really Got Me" as the band's debut single. He said, "It kind of bummed me out that Ted [Templeman] wanted our first single to be someone else's tune. I would have maybe picked "Jamie's Cryin'", just because it was our own."

The Kinks' Dave Davies has claimed to dislike Van Halen's rendition of the song, saying "There's the thing: good art isn't always about having the comfiest technique. I shouldn't encourage him, but I'm sure Eddie Van Halen played better when he was drunk." He also told of how a concert-goer approached him after a live show and congratulated him on performing a "great cover of the Van Halen song". Ray Davies, on the other hand, claimed to like the track because it made him laugh.

=== Charts ===
Chart (1978)	Peak position
Australia (Kent Music Report)	12
Canadian RPM Top Singles	49
US Billboard Hot 100	36

Chart (2020)	Peak position
US Hot Rock & Alternative Songs (Billboard)	21

=== Certifications ===
Region	Certification	Certified units/sales
New Zealand (RMNZ)	Gold	15,000^{‡}
^{‡} Sales+streaming figures based on certification alone.

== See also ==
- List of UK Singles Chart number ones of the 1960s

== Bibliography ==
- Creswell, Toby (2007). 1001 Songs. Hardie Grant. ISBN 978-1-74066-458-5.
- Fleiner, Carey (2017). The Kinks: A Thoroughly English Phenomenon. Lanham, Maryland: Rowman & Littlefield. ISBN 978-1-4422-3542-7 – via Google Books.
- Gelbart, Matthew (2003). "Persona and Voice in the Kinks' Songs of the Late 1960s". Journal of the Royal Musical Association. 128 (2): 200–241. doi:10.1093/jrma/128.2.200. ISSN 0269-0403.
- Hasted, Nick (2011). You Really Got Me: The Story of the Kinks. Omnibus Press. ISBN 978-1849386609.
- Hinman, Doug (2004). The Kinks: All Day and All of the Night: Day by Day Concerts, Recordings, and Broadcasts, 1961-1996. Backbeat Books. ISBN 978-0879307653.
- Hinman, Doug; Sandoval, Andrew (2026). The Kinks: All Day and All of the Night: The Day-by-Day Story Pt. 1: 1940–1971. Beatland Books.
- Jackson, Joe (2000). A Cure for Gravity. Anchor Books. ISBN 978-1862300842.
- Jovanovic, Rob (2014). God Save The Kinks: A Biography. Aurum Press. ISBN 978-1781311646.
- Tolinsky, Brad (2010). Guitar World Presents Van Halen. Backbeat Books. ISBN 978-0879309695.
- Unterberger, Richie (2002). "Kinks". In Bogdanov, Vladimir; Woodstra, Chris; Erlewine, Stephen Thomas (eds.). All Music Guide to Rock: The Definitive Guide to Rock, Pop, and Soul. San Francisco: Backbeat Books. ISBN 0-87930-653-X.
- Walser, Robert (1993). Running with the Devil: Power, Gender, and Madness in Heavy Metal Music. Wesleyan University Press. ISBN 0-8195-6260-2.
