= Give the People What They Want (The Kinks song) =

Song by The Kinks

from the album Give the People What They Want
- Released: 15 August 1981 (US); January 1982 (UK)
- Recorded: May 1979 – June 1981 at Konk Studios, London
- Genre: Rock
- Length: 3:45
- Label: Arista Records
- Songwriter: Ray Davies
- Producer: Ray Davies

"Give the People What They Want" is a song by the British rock band the Kinks. Released on their 1981 album Give the People What They Want, the song was written by the band's main singer and core songwriter, Ray Davies.

== Background ==
The origins of "Give the People What They Want" are found during the sessions from Low Budget, where it was included in early running orders of the album. "Give the People What They Want", however, would be held from the final line-up of Low Budget.

== Release ==
"Give the People What They Want" was released as the second track on the Kinks' 1981 album Give the People What They Want. It wasn't released as a single in any countries. The song appeared in live form on two of the band's live albums, Live: The Road in 1988 (this rendition of the song appeared on the compilation album Lost & Found (1986-1989) and the American release of To the Bone in 1996. It has since appeared on multiple compilation albums, including You Really Got Me: The Very Best of the Kinks and the box set The Arista Years.

== Reception ==
AllMusic critic Stephen Thomas Erlewine said that "there's a certain charm in ... his pure cynicism on ['Give the People What They Want']" and went on to cite the track as a highlight from the Give the People What They Want album. Music critic Robert Christgau called "Give the People What They Want" misanthropic.
