= Father Christmas (song) =

Single by the Kinks
- B-side: "Prince of the Punks"
- Released: 25 November 1977
- Recorded: Begun 1976, completed October 1977 at Konk Studios, Hornsey, London
- Genre: Punk rock; Christmas; Comedy rock
- Length: 3:45
- Label: Arista 153 (UK); Arista AS 0296 (US)
- Songwriter: Ray Davies
- Producer: Ray Davies

The Kinks singles chronology
"Juke Box Music" (1977)	"Father Christmas" (1977)	"A Rock 'n' Roll Fantasy" (1978)

Music video
- "Father Christmas" on YouTube

"Father Christmas" is a song by English rock band the Kinks, released in 1977.

It tells of a department store Father Christmas who is beaten up by a gang of poor kids who tell him to give them money instead of toys, as toys are impractical, and asks that the toys be given "to the little rich boys".

== Background ==
"Father Christmas" is sung from the perspective of a Mall Santa who is mugged by working class kids, who tell him to leave his presents for "the little rich boys" and request for money and jobs for their parents instead. Guitarist Dave Davies commented on the song, "I love the humour of it, and the aggression and bitterness. I could see the faces of my parents when Christmas came around. They had to struggle to make ends meet. We kind of got what we needed, but there was something fake about the holiday." In live performances, singer Ray Davies would dress up in full Father Christmas attire.

The song features a punk rock arrangement with prominent distorted guitar riffs. Dave Davies commented, "'Father Christmas' is very special to me, 'cause [it was] an opportunity to put interesting guitar parts in there...guitar riffs that [I think] sound great." The track also features Christmas bells to add to the holiday theme.

== Release ==
The "Father Christmas" single was released in November 1977. It was accompanied by a music video featuring Ray Davies dressed as the titular character.

The track was included on the Arista compilation Come Dancing with The Kinks and is also available as a bonus track on the CD reissue of the Kinks' 1978 album Misfits.

In 2023 the new mix of the song was released as a single.

=== "Prince of the Punks" ===
The B-side to the single was another Ray Davies composition, "Prince of the Punks". It was written in the bitter aftermath of Davies' troubled stint as the co-producer for Café Society's debut album, which was issued in 1975. Davies wrote as part of the lyrics, "Tried to be gay/But it didn’t pay/So he bought a motorbike instead", in direct reference to Tom Robinson, one of the band members of the short-lived Café Society.

== Legacy ==
The song has been covered a number of times by bands including the Gigolo Aunts, Dispatch, Green Day, Man Overboard, Bad Religion, Warrant, Lit, Bowling For Soup, Save Ferris, Letters to Cleo, Smash Mouth, Cary Brothers, Action Action, Everything, Deer Tick, OK Go, the Unlikely Candidates, Cheap Trick, Matt Nathanson, Chris Jericho, the Riverboat Gamblers, and Lauran Hibberd.

Jazz vocalist Jacqui Naylor included the song on her 2007 album Smashed for the Holidays.

Warrant's cover was featured on a hair metal Christmas tribute record called We Wish You a Hairy Christmas, where it was the opening track.

The track appeared in a TV spot for Unaccompanied Minors and in episodes of the TV series That '70s Show and Bob's Burgers. The song also appeared in the 2008 comedy film Step Brothers.
