= Destroyer (The Kinks song) =

Single by The Kinks

from the album Give the People What They Want
- B-side: "Back to Front"
- Released: 28 September 1981 (US)
- Recorded: May 1979 – June 1981
- Studio: Power Station, New York City
- Genre: Hard rock; new wave
- Length: 3:47
- Label: Arista AS 0619
- Songwriter: Ray Davies
- Producer: Ray Davies

The Kinks US singles chronology
"You Really Got Me (live)" (1980)	"Destroyer" (1981)	"Better Things" (1981)

Music video
- "Destroyer" on YouTube

"Destroyer" is a song by English rock band the Kinks, written by Ray Davies. It was released as a track on the group's nineteenth album, Give the People What They Want, in August 1981, and was the album's lead single in the US. It was not released as a single in the UK.

The song features references to the band's earlier hits, including the riff from 1964's "All Day and All of the Night" and lyrics inspired by 1970's "Lola". Like other Kinks songs of the period, "Destroyer" features a heavier, rock-based sound. After being abandoned during the Low Budget sessions, the song was finally released on Give the People What They Want.

== Background ==
"Destroyer" was initially planned to appear on the band's previous album, Low Budget, appearing in early track listings of the in-progress album. However, the song was dropped from Low Budget because the band could not create a satisfactory mix.

"Destroyer" was ultimately recorded at the Power Station studio. Drummer Mick Avory attributed the song's dense sound to the studio's audio dynamics; he said, "We recorded that at the Power Station in New York in the ambient room, which had a great drum sound. The sound of the room can really affect what you’re doing. When you hear that sound slapping around that big room, you want to cut loose. That’s what I did."

== Music and lyrics ==
"Destroyer" features callbacks to previous Kinks songs, both lyrically and musically. The track borrows the main riff from the Kinks' 1964 song, "All Day and All of the Night", which was one of the band's first hits. The lyrics feature the return of the transvestite title character from the Kinks' 1970 hit song, "Lola"; in "Destroyer", the singer brings Lola to his place where he becomes increasingly paranoid.

According to Modern Drummer's Patrick Berkery, the song features a "metallic" sound that reflects the band's "louder and more riff oriented" sound during the late 1970s and early 1980s. Berkery notes Mick Avory's "trashier fills" and "bigger [drum] sound that was miles removed from the lighter touch of his early days."

Record World said that it's "perhaps the first heavy metal rap song" and uses "the basic riff from 'All Day and All of the Night.'"

== Release and reception ==
The track was chosen as the lead single from the album in the US ("Better Things" was the lead single in the UK), although it was released after the album in September. In 1982, the single reached No. 3 on the Billboard Rock Top Tracks chart and No. 85 on the Billboard Hot 100.

In the UK, the track was available only when the album was released there in January 1982.
