= Live Life =

Single by The Kinks

from the album Misfits
- B-side: "In a Foreign Land" (UK); "Black Messiah" (US)
- Released: 19 May 1978
- Recorded: July 1977 – January 1978 at Konk Studios, London
- Genre: Rock
- Length: 3:49; 4:47 (U.K. LP Version)
- Label: Arista 199 (U.K.); Arista 0372 (U.S.)
- Songwriter: Ray Davies
- Producer: Ray Davies

The Kinks singles chronology
"A Rock 'n' Roll Fantasy" (1978)	"Live Life" (1978)	"Black Messiah" (1978)

"Live Life" is a track from the Kinks' 1978 album, Misfits. The track was written by the Kinks' primary songwriter, Ray Davies.

== About ==
The lyrics of the song, in a similar theme to many other tracks written by Ray Davies, say that, no matter what's happening in the world, you must pick yourself up (since no one else is going to help you). The track also makes references to "the fascists and the left wing militants", "crooked politicians and the unemployment queues", and the Irish Republican Army, who, at the time, used illegal methods to attempt breaking away from Britain.

The track also features Ron Lawrence playing bass guitar instead of Andy Pyle or John Dalton (the bassists that were members of the band at one point of the album's recording). Session drummer Clem Cattini performs drums.

=== Dave Davies's opinion ===
Dave Davies has since praised the song on his Facebook account saying, "I love it - its one of my favorite tracks." He also praised Cattini's drums, saying, "Clem Cattini did a great job playing drums on this."

== Release ==
"Live Life" had multiple appearances on the Kinks' records. It first appeared on Misfits, where it was the third track (except in Britain, where a longer version of the track was instead seventh in the running order). On the Remastered CD version of the album, however, the U.K. version of the album became the listing that was used, with the non-U.K. version of "Live Life" being added as a bonus track. To add, "Live Life" replaced "Artificial Light" as the B-side of the "A Rock 'n' Roll Fantasy" single in America. Then, on 14 July 1978, it was released as the second single from Misfits, backed with "In a Foreign Land" in Britain and "Black Messiah" in America. It didn't chart.
