= Black Messiah (song) =

Single by The Kinks

from the album Misfits
- B-side: "Misfits"
- Released: 19 May 1978
- Recorded: July 1977 – January 1978 at Konk Studios, London
- Genre: Rock
- Length: 4:08
- Label: Arista 210
- Songwriter: Ray Davies
- Producer: Ray Davies

The Kinks singles chronology
| "Live Life" (1978) | "Black Messiah" (1978) | "(Wish I Could Fly Like) Superman" (1979) |

"Black Messiah" is the third single from the Kinks' 1978 album Misfits. It was written by Ray Davies.

== Lyrics ==
The lyrics of "Black Messiah" cite racial and civil differences and unrest. The lead singer is a white man who lives in an all black neighborhood. This causes unrest, with the singer claiming that "they knock me down 'cos they brown and I white". Meanwhile, a "self-made prophet" in the house next door to the singer's claims that a "Black Messiah" "is gonna set the world on fire" and "set the whole world free". At first, the white man is skeptical, but he soon changes his opinion and believes the prophet. The song criticizes the so-called "racial equality" that blacks and whites say they strive for, saying that neither race really believes in this goal wholeheartedly.

== Release and reception ==
"Black Messiah" was released on the Misfits album, but was also released in single form. On the US version of the "Live Life" single, "Black Messiah" replaced "In a Foreign Land" as the B-side. However, in Britain, "Black Messiah" became the third single from Misfits, backed with "Misfits". The single was unsuccessful, and did not chart. However, this slightly different single edit was released as a bonus track on the reissue of Misfits. Also, on the UK version of the Misfits album, "Black Messiah" was switched with "Live Life" in the running order, making it the third track on the UK album.

"Black Messiah" has received mixed to negative reviews, mostly because of its lyrical content. Robert Christgau called the track "dismaying", and sarcastically remarked that "Enoch Powell would be proud." Rolling Stone's Ken Emerson said that although "'Black Messiah' rightly ridicules the naive enthusiasm of white audiences for the Rastafari references of reggae (which it travesties musically by adulterating it with Dixieland), the song raises without resolving the issue of Davies' own racism."
