= Do It Again (The Kinks song) =

Single by the Kinks

from the album Word of Mouth
- B-side: "Guilty"
- Released: 4 December 1984
- Recorded: June 1983 – September 1984
- Studio: Konk, London
- Genre: Rock, Power pop
- Length: 4:14
- Label: Arista
- Songwriter: Ray Davies
- Producer: Ray Davies

The Kinks singles chronology
"Good Day" (1984)	"Do It Again" (1984)	"How Are You" (1986)

Music video
- "Do It Again" on YouTube

"Do It Again" is a song by British rock band the Kinks. Written by lead singer Ray Davies, the song was released as the first track on the Kinks' album Word of Mouth. Written as an observation on stressful working schedules, the song features an opening guitar chord and echoed vocals.

Released as a single in both America and Britain, the song found moderate success on the American charts. The single was accompanied by a Julien Temple-directed video, featuring the band as well as former Kinks drummer Mick Avory. The song was positively received by critics and has since appeared on compilation albums and other media.

== Background and recording ==
"Do It Again" was written by Kinks front-man Ray Davies about his strenuous touring schedule and anyone who has a busy schedule. Davies later said of the song,

I think it applies to everybody who gets up in the morning and has to go out and do their job. Sometimes it’s not great being on tour. It’s a cliché now, but everyone knows what happens on the road. You have very little sleep, I usually go to sleep about four or five o’clock, then I have to get up at eight or nine o’clock, get a plane and go somewhere else and play. When the knock comes on the door, I know I have got to get up. It’s not just in my job, people who are electricians and work in Woolworth’s have to do it.

"Do It Again" had been recorded between June 1983 and September 1984, with mixes of the song being completed from 9 to 11 October of the same year. A promotional single was mastered on 15 October and sent to radio stations in November.

== Music and lyrics ==
"Do It Again", unlike the previous Kinks singles released from 1983 to 1984, is a hard rock track, very much in line with the musical qualities of the rest of the tracks on Word of Mouth. It is sung by Ray Davies, similarly to many other Kinks tracks. It opens with a single guitar chord, which many found reminiscent of the opening chord on A Hard Day's Night, and Davies voice is often echoed throughout the track. On the album To the Bone, two versions of the track appeared, one being an acoustic styled version of the track.

The lyrics of "Do It Again" have a simple theme of "get up and do it again".

== Release and reception ==
"Do It Again" was the lead-off track from Word of Mouth as well as the second UK (and first US) single from that album. The song peaked at number 41 in America (and number 4 on the US Mainstream Rock Tracks chart) and number 91 in Canada. Prior to this release, however, the track was issued as a 12-inch single for promotional purposes on 1 November 1984. Sixteen days later, the track was performed on Saturday Night Live, along with "Word of Mouth". A promotional video, directed by Julien Temple for Nitrate Films, was filmed for the song, starring Ray Davies with appearances by the rest of the band. Recently departed Kinks drummer Mick Avory also made a guest appearance in the video as a "hapless busker that Ray has to part ways with". The song also appeared on the compilation albums Come Dancing with The Kinks and To the Bone.

"Do It Again" was described as a "circular, synth-spiked minor hit", and praised as one of the few distinctive tracks from Word of Mouth by AllMusic's Stephen Thomas Erlewine. Rolling Stone said that the track "has a recognizable kick, with Dave's brisk uppercut fuzz chords counting off a spry 'Victoria' rhythm".

== Chart performance ==
Chart performance for "Do It Again"
Chart (1984–1985)	Peak position
Canada	91
US Billboard Hot 100	41
US Billboard Mainstream Rock Tracks	4

== Other appearances ==
Aside from appearing in the film Click and advertisements for the 2013 edition of the Tour de France, the song was also the namesake for the film Do It Again, which was about reporter Geoff Edgers attempting to reunite the Kinks.
