= Richard Gilliam =

American writer

Richard Gilliam is a short story author and the editor of such theme anthologies as Confederacy of the Dead (1993), Phobias (1994) and the Grails series (1992–94). He has contributed fantasy short stories to numerous books and magazines, and his non-fiction includes Joltin' Joe DiMaggio (1999).

Gilliam began as a sportswriter and worked as a publicist to Coach Bear Bryant at the University of Alabama. A veteran anthologist, he worked from his home in Green Bay, Wisconsin.

He devised the Movie Links online game in 1990, and it was played extensively on GEnie four years before the quite similar Six Degrees of Kevin Bacon game was promoted in 1994. Gilliam's game is much more difficult in that a player is required to find the shortest number of movies linking actors as diverse as, say, Gloria Swanson and Chris Farley rather than links to the same specific actor (a feat which can be memorized).

== Awards ==
His story "Caroline and Caleb" was a Best Novella nominee in the 1993 Bram Stoker Awards, given annually by the Horror Writers Association.

His book "Grails: Quests, Visitations and Other Occurrences" was nominated for the World Fantasy Award—Anthology award in 1993.

== Read ==
- Gilliam, Richard. "Crone Woman Gandy" 100 Wicked Little Witch Stories (Sterling, 1995)
