= Word of Mouth (The Kinks album) =

Studio album by the Kinks
- Released: 15 November 1984
- Recorded: June 1983–September 1984
- Studio: Konk Studios, London
- Genre: Power pop; hard rock
- Length: 43:04
- Label: Arista
- Producer: Ray Davies

The Kinks chronology
State of Confusion (1983)	Word of Mouth (1984)	Think Visual (1986)

Singles from Word of Mouth
- 1. "Good Day" Released: 1984 (UK); 2. "Do It Again" Released: 1984; 3. "Living on a Thin Line" Released: 1985 (US, Radio Promo); 4. "Summer's Gone" Released: 1985 (US)

Professional ratings
Review scores
Source	Rating
AllMusic	2.5/5 stars
Blender	3/5 stars
Rolling Stone	4/5 stars

Word of Mouth is the twenty-first studio album by the English rock group the Kinks released in November 1984.

== Background ==
The song "Good Day" includes an allusion to the death of actress Diana Dors.

Three tracks ("Going Solo", "Missing Persons", and "Sold Me Out") were repurposed for Kinks leader Ray Davies' solo debut album, the soundtrack to his concurrently produced, self-directed film, Return to Waterloo.

== Uses in media ==
The track "Living on a Thin Line" by Dave Davies was played three times in the 2001 episode "University" of the American TV show The Sopranos. According to producer Terence Winter on the DVD extras, it is the series' most asked-about song. The song was also played in the final episode of the HBO series Vice Principals.

The song "Do It Again" was featured in the film Click (released in 2006), and in trailers that were promoting the film. It was also used in TV ad promotions for the 2013 edition of the Tour de France.

== Commercial performance ==
The album spent twenty weeks on the US Billboard album charts and reached its peak position of No. 57 in February 1985.

== Track listing ==
All tracks are written by Ray Davies, except where noted.

Side one
No.	Title	Writer(s)	Length
1.	"Do It Again"		4:14
2.	"Word of Mouth"		3:51
3.	"Good Day"		4:35
4.	"Living on a Thin Line"	Dave Davies	4:16
5.	"Sold Me Out"		3:44

Side two
No.	Title	Writer(s)	Length
1.	"Massive Reductions"		3:15
2.	"Guilty"	D. Davies	4:12
3.	"Too Hot"		4:08
4.	"Missing Persons"		2:53
5.	"Summer's Gone"		3:52
6.	"Going Solo"		3:58

1999 CD reissue bonus tracks
No.	Title	Length
12.	"Good Day" (extended edit)	5:31
13.	"Summer's Gone" (extended edit)	4:54

== Personnel ==
The Kinks

- Ray Davies – guitar, keyboards, harmonica, vocals, drum machine on "Good Day", "Do It Again" and "Living on a Thin Line"
- Dave Davies – guitar, background vocals, lead vocals on "Guilty" and "Living on a Thin Line"
- Jim Rodford – bass, background vocals
- Bob Henrit – drums, percussion except on "Missing Persons", "Sold Me Out" and "Going Solo"
- Mick Avory – drums, percussion on "Missing Persons", "Sold Me Out" and "Going Solo"
- Ian Gibbons – keyboards, background vocals

Additional personnel

- David Baker – engineer
- Donn Davenport – art direction
- Chris Morton – concept
- Maude Gilman, Howard Fritzson – design
- Renate Stürmer – illustration
