= A Hole in the Sock of (Dave Davies) =

Unreleased album by Dave Davies

A Hole in the Sock of Dave Davies refers to an unreleased album of solo material by Dave Davies, lead guitarist and co-founder of British rock band the Kinks. Apparently the album was, at least for a time, intended to be released under the name Lincoln County, however, numerous names have been applied to it, including The Album That Never Was.

== Background ==
In July 1967, Dave Davies readied his first solo single, credited entirely under his name (although co-written by his brother and fellow Kinks member Ray Davies), entitled "Death of a Clown". In the past, as a member of the Kinks, Dave Davies had only released his own compositions on B-sides and as part of larger LPs. The Kinks' record label sensed potential sales in a solo release from the overlooked Davies, and issued "Death of a Clown" as his debut. Although credited to Davies, it was technically a Kinks recording, as his backing band was, in fact, the Kinks.

Upon release, "Death of a Clown" unexpectedly rose to number three on the UK singles chart. Wanting to profit off the new buzz that was suddenly surrounding Davies, a solo LP was scheduled for release some time in 1968 or 1969.

A follow-up single, "Susannah's Still Alive", was released in November 1967. However, it only reached number 20 on Melody Maker. The release of the solo album was held back, and it was decided to wait and see how another single would fare. As anticipation grew for the release of the new LP, fans nicknamed it A Hole in the Sock Of. The name was based on a remark Ray Davies had made to a reporter during an interview about the title of Dave's forthcoming solo album and was, although meant ironically, taken seriously. The title was a send up possibly of the Beatles ambitious "A Day in the Life" or Traffic's "Hole in My Shoe".

"Lincoln County" was chosen as the next single but failed to chart. With subsequent singles meeting the same result, a combination of Davies' own lack of interest in continuing and Pye's decision to stop killed off any hopes of an album.

In a 1999 interview, Davies stated that:

I was quite surprised when management and the record company wanted me to make an album. I thought it was quite daunting. There were a couple of tunes I liked – 'Suzannah's Still Alive,' 'Lincoln County' – but it had to feel right, and it didn't feel right. I did a few songs in a demo studio and I knocked out three or four songs, and one of them was 'Creeping Jean,' and I started to get very depressed about the whole idea. One of the last songs I recorded then was 'I'm Crying,' so you can tell what frame of mind I was in.

== Recording and tracks ==
Work began on the album project after the unexpected success of "Death of a Clown". Initially, proposed material included blues songs by Lead Belly and Big Bill Broonzy in addition to original material; ultimately, lack of both interest and original material delayed further work on an LP until the very end of 1968, when four new songs were recorded at Polydor Studios in London. Work was to have completed early in 1969 but was delayed at least partly when Dave Davies fractured a finger. Much of the unissued material seems to have been recorded in June 1969, just after completion of recordings for Arthur (with John Dalton, not Pete Quaife, on bass). Two tracks ("This Man He Weeps Tonight" and "Mindless Child of Motherhood"), both released as B-sides of Kinks singles, were recorded as part of the Arthur sessions.

Reprise files imply that Reprise received tapes of this album, under the title Lincoln County, in July 1969 while it was still considered for release by the band. By September of that year, the decision was made not to release the album. Throughout 1970, reports of a reworked version with new material were discussed; the possibility of issuing Dave's LP as the second half of a 2-LP set was raised, but by the close of that year all talk of the LP's release had ceased. Oddly, tapes of this LP were not officially logged into Reprise's official master tape log until 1972, as part of their contractual settlement after the Kinks moved to RCA. Short of the existence of this acetate in their vaults, there is no other indication that Reprise ever seriously considered this LP for release in its entirety. All songs were mixed (in the case of "Susannah's Still Alive", remixed) in stereo for this release. The track listing given here is per Doug Hinman.

1. "Susannah's Still Alive" (released as a single in 1967, remixed stereo version released on Kink Kronikles)
2. "There Is No Life Without Love" (released as a B-side of "Lincoln Country", mono version released on The Album That Never Was and bonus tracks for Something Else, mono version released on the 2011 Deluxe Mono version of "Arthur"
3. "This Man He Weeps Tonight" (released as a B-side of "Shangri-La", mono version released on the 2011 Deluxe Mono version of "Arthur"
4. "Mindless Child of Motherhood" (released as a B-side of "Drivin'", both mono and stereo version released on Arthur CD re-release)
5. "Hold My Hand" (released as a single in 1969, mono version released on The Album That Never Was; stereo version released on 2011 Arthur deluxe edition)
6. "Do You Wish to Be a Man?" (stereo version released on Hidden Treasures)
7. "Are You Ready?" (stereo version released on Hidden Treasures)
8. "Creeping Jean" (released as a B-side of "Hold My Hand", stereo version released on the 2004 Deluxe Edition of Village Green Preservation Society, mono version released on 2011 Arthur deluxe edition)
9. "I'm Crying" (stereo version released on Hidden Treasures)
10. "Lincoln County" (released as a single in 1968, mono version released on The Album That Never Was and bonus tracks for Something Else CD re-release) (longer stereo version released on 2011 Arthur deluxe edition)
11. "Mr. Shoemaker's Daughter" (stereo version released on Arthur CD re-release)
12. "Mr. Reporter" (stereo version released on Face to Face and remixed stereo version released on 2011 Arthur deluxe edition)
13. "Groovy Movies" (stereo version released on the 2004 Deluxe Edition of Village Green Preservation Society)

== The Album That Never Was ==
Although the unreleased album is sometimes called The Album That Never Was, several other unreleased Kinks projects were called this over time. A compilation of Dave Davies' solo singles and B-sides was released under this title in 1987, and included "This Man He Weeps Tonight". In the version released in Japan, "Mr. Shoemakers Daughter" can also be found.

=== Tracks (UK) ===
Side 1

1. "Death of a Clown"
2. "Love Me Till the Sun Shines"
3. "Susannah's Still Alive"
4. "Funny Face"
5. "Lincoln County"

Side 2

1. "There Is No Life Without Love"
2. "Hold My Hand"
3. "Creeping Jean"
4. "Mindless Child of Motherhood"
5. "This Man He Weeps Tonight"

=== Tracks (Japan CD) ===
1. "Death of a Clown"
2. "Love Me Till the Sun Shines"
3. "Suzannah's Still Alive"
4. "Funny Face"
5. "Lincoln County"
6. "There Is No Life Without Love"
7. "Hold My Hand"
8. "Creeping Jean"
9. "Mindless Child of Motherhood"
10. "This Man He Weeps Tonight"
11. "Come on Now"
12. "Wonder Where My Baby Is Tonight"
13. "I Am Free"
14. "What's in Store for Me"
15. "I'm Not Like Everybody Else"
16. "Party Line"
17. "You're Lookin' Fine"
18. "Mr. Reporter"
19. "Wicked Annabella"
20. "Mr. Shoemaker's Daughter"
21. "Strangers"
22. "Rats"

== Hidden Treasures ==
All tracks are written by Dave Davies.

No.	Title	Length
1.	"Susannah's Still Alive"	2:19
2.	"This Man He Weeps Tonight"	2:39
3.	"Mindless Child of Motherhood"	3:10
4.	"Hold My Hand"	3:13
5.	"Do You Wish to Be a Man?"	2:43
6.	"Are You Ready?"	4:03
7.	"Creeping Jean"	3:11
8.	"Crying"	2:40
9.	"Lincoln County"	3:21
10.	"Mr. Shoemaker's Daughter"	3:08
11.	"Mr. Reporter"	3:37
12.	"Groovy Movies"	2:33
13.	"There's No Life Without Love"	2:00
14.	"I Am Free" (Mono Mix)	2:32
15.	"Death of a Clown" (Mono Mix)	3:01
16.	"Love Me Till the Sun Shines" (Mono Mix)	3:17
17.	"Susannah's Still Alive" (Mono Mix)	2:20
18.	"Funny Face" (Mono Mix)	2:17
19.	"Lincoln County" (Mono Mix)	3:09
20.	"There's No Life Without Love" (Mono Mix)	2:05
21.	"Hold My Hand" (Mono Mix)	3:18
22.	"Creeping Jean" (Mono Mix)	3:14
23.	"This Man He Weeps Tonight" (Mono Mix)	2:42
24.	"Mindless Child of Motherhood" (Mono Mix)	3:16
25.	"Mr. Reporter" (Alternative Mix)	4:04
26.	"Hold My Hand" (1968 Stereo Demo)	2:59
27.	"Good Luck Charm" (Rare Studio Version)	1:39

Compiled and researched by Russell Smith and mastered by Andrew Sandoval and released 31 October 2011, the first 13 tracks of Hidden Treasures represent Dave's unreleased album based on the tapes that were submitted to Reprise in 1969. Tracks 15–24 represent a mono version of the unreleased album.

== See also ==
- The Great Lost Kinks Album
- Four More Respected Gentlemen
- The Kinks Are The Village Green Preservation Society
