= Lincoln County (song) =

- Dutch picture sleeve

Single by Dave Davies
- B-side: "There Is No Life Without Love"
- Released: 30 August 1968
- Recorded: March 1968
- Studio: Pye, London
- Genre: Folk rock; country
- Length: 3:12
- Label: Pye
- Songwriter: Dave Davies
- Producer: Ray Davies

Dave Davies singles chronology
"Susannah's Still Alive" (1967)	"Lincoln County" (1968)	"Hold My Hand" (1969)

Official audio
- "Lincoln County" on YouTube

"Lincoln County" is a 1968 song by British musician Dave Davies, who is best known as a guitarist for the rock band the Kinks. It was his third single.

== Recording ==
"Lincoln County" was recorded around the sessions of The Kinks Are the Village Green Preservation Society, and, like his previous two singles, "Death of a Clown" and "Susannah's Still Alive", featured all of the members of the Kinks participating.

== Release ==
Dave Davies' third solo 45 had a checkered history: two release dates came and went before it was released. Contrary to popular belief, the single was not released and withdrawn, although a handful of promo copies were date stamped with the previous release dates. The delays were partly down to the record label, Pye Records, not wanting competing Kinks product and the Kinks' uncertainty of what their next single would be. As a result, the single was delayed until an appropriate gap in the release schedule became available. "Lincoln County" was eventually released in June 1968, backed with "There Is No Life Without Love". Unlike the previous two Dave Davies singles, "Lincoln Country" flopped internationally and at home, only hitting No. 15 on the Dutch Singles Chart and missing the charts elsewhere. There was only modest promotion of the single by Pye, but surprisingly it did get good airplay on the fledgling BBC Radio 1 station as well a promotional film recorded to support its release. After this, Davies would only release one more single ("Hold My Hand") before putting his solo career on hold until the 1980 album AFL1-3603 (other than some solo dabblings in the mid '70s after the Kinks' own recording studios Konk opened in 1973).

"Lincoln County", along with Davies' other solo singles from the time, was originally intended to be released on a studio album. However, the singles' lack of success, and Davies' disaffection with the material, caused him to abandon the project. (The album did not yet have a name when Davies stopped working on it, although Davies, in one interview, stated ironically that it would be titled A Hole in the Sock of (Dave Davies), which has led some fans to refer to it by that name.) The recorded material, including "Lincoln County", was eventually released on the 1987 Dave Davies compilation album The Album That Never Was, then again, in remastered form, on the 2011 compilation album Hidden Treasures. It was also included, along with "Susannah's Still Alive", on the 1998 and 2004 reissues of the album Something Else by the Kinks.

== Reception ==
"Lincoln County" has generally received positive reviews from critics. Stephen Thomas Erlewine of AllMusic cited the song as a highlight from the Dave Davies compilation album Hidden Treasures. Richie Unterberger, also of AllMusic, called the track a highlight from The Album That Never Was. Author Andy Miller called the single "fabulous".

== Personnel ==
According to band researcher Doug Hinman:

The Kinks

- Dave Davies – lead vocal
- Ray Davies – organ
- Pete Quaife – bass
- Mick Avory – drums, tambourine

Additional musicians

- David Whitaker – string arrangement
- Unidentified session musicians – string section
