= The Great Lost Kinks Album =

1973 compilation album by the Kinks

Compilation album by the Kinks
- Released: 25 January 1973
- Recorded: 1966–1970
- Studios: Pye, Riverside and Morgan, London
- Genre: Pop
- Length: 36:08
- Label: Reprise
- Producers: Ray Davies; Shel Talmy

The Kinks US chronology
Everybody's in Show-Biz (1972)	The Great Lost Kinks Album (1973)	Preservation Act 1 (1973)

The Great Lost Kinks Album is a compilation album by the English rock band the Kinks. Released in the United States in January 1973, it features material recorded by the group between 1966 and 1970 that had mostly gone unreleased. The compilation served to satisfy Reprise Records after executives determined that the Kinks contractually owed them one more album, despite the band's departure from the label in 1971.

The Great Lost Kinks Album offered the debut of many previously unreleased tracks, while others had only been released as non-album singles. Most of its songs date to the sessions for the 1968 album The Kinks Are the Village Green Preservation Society and were delivered by Ray Davies to Reprise in July 1969 out of a contractual obligation. Musician John Mendelsohn wrote liner notes for the album which extensively derided Davies' contemporary songwriting in comparison to his late 1960s work. Both contemporary and retrospective critics have generally described the compilation as uneven. Several suggested that its joining of strong and weak tracks meant it would only appeal to devoted Kinks fans.

The album's sales were driven by fans of the band's late 1960s work, peaking at No. 145 on Billboard's Top LP's & Tape chart, additionally reaching No. 78 and No. 74 on Cash Box and Record World's charts, respectively. The Kinks had no involvement in the album's preparation and Davies only learned of its existence after its release. He initiated legal action against Reprise over the album, resulting in its 1975 deletion from the label's catalogue, though it remained popular among Kinks fans into the 2000s for its inclusion of rare and otherwise unobtainable tracks. Several of its songs were later made available as bonus tracks on the 2004 CD reissue of Village Green.

== Background ==
On 2 July 1969, Ray Davies and manager Robert Wace delivered numerous tracks to Reprise Records's offices. Most of them were for the Kinks' 1969 studio album, Arthur, as well as a potential Dave Davies solo album. They delivered an extra reel of twelve songs, marked as "spare tracks" and not assigned a master tape number, indicating they were likely not planned for an immediate release. (Note: The twelve were "Til Death Us Do Part", "This Is Where I Belong", "Lavender Hill", "Plastic Man", "King Kong", "Berkeley Mews", "Rosemary Rose", "Easy Come There You Went", "Pictures in the Sand", "Mr. Songbird", "Where Did My Spring Go?" and "When I Turn Out the Living Room Light".) Author Doug Hinman suggests the additional songs' delivery was likely due to a contractual obligation that the Kinks provide the label a set number of songs over a scheduled period. Ray Davies later expressed he was hesitant to deliver them because he did not feel they were up to standard and wanted to include a note explaining, "please, we're just fulfilling our contract, just put it in a vault somewhere."

In 1971, the Kinks' seven-year contract with Reprise was set to expire. Disappointed with several clauses in the band's contract, Davies opted to instead sign the band with RCA Records. The same year, Reprise rejected the Percy soundtrack album for US release, finding it lacked commercial potential in the American market. Because they did not release Percy, executives at Reprise determined that the Kinks contractually owed the label one more album.

== Song selection ==
The Kinks recently began recording on RCA Records. How is it possible for them to have a "new" album on Reprise? Well ... Reprise apparently has a number of old songs the Kinks recorded and never released. ... [T]he recordings weren't good enough before, but now that that's all Reprise has, they're suddenly all right.

— Critic Chuck Lowery on The Great Lost Kinks Album, 1973

In 1972, without Davies' knowledge or approval, Reprise began assembling a compilation album of mostly unreleased Kinks material. The label's working title for the project was Son of Kink Kronikles, a reference to the company's March 1972 compilation The Kink Kronikles. In the early 1970s, compilation albums collecting previously unreleased material had become increasingly common among record labels seeking to undermine bootleg recordings. Reprise later re-titled the project The Great Lost Kinks Album, a reference to the Kinks' unreleased 1968 album, Four More Respected Gentlemen, though the content of the two was mostly unrelated.

Of the twelve "spare tracks" delivered to Reprise in 1969, three – "This Is Where I Belong", "King Kong" and "Berkeley Mews" – were dropped after having been already included on The Kink Kronikles. The instrumental "Easy Come, There You Went" was also dropped. Songs added included "Misty Water", recorded in May 1968 and originally planned for release on Four More Respected Gentlemen; "I'm Not Like Everybody Else", the non-album B-side to the 1966 single "Sunny Afternoon"; "The Way Love Used to Be", a ballad from the Percy soundtrack album; and "There Is No Life Without Love", "Groovy Movies" and "This Man He Weeps Tonight" from the unreleased Dave Davies solo album. The album's fourteen tracks range chronologically from "I'm Not Like Everybody Else" to "The Way Love Used to Be", recorded in May 1966 and October 1970, respectively. Most of the songs were recording during the sessions for the 1968 album The Kinks Are the Village Green Preservation Society. Almost all of the songs were recorded in the basement studios at Pye Records's London offices; "When I Turn Out the Living Room Light" was recorded at Riverside Studios, West London, and "The Way Love Used to Be" at Morgan Studios, North West London. Ray Davies produced every track, except for "I'm Not Like Everybody Else", which is credited to Shel Talmy.

== Release and commercial performance ==
Reprise released The Great Lost Kinks Album in the US on 25 January 1973. The album's cover features the painting Proliferation by Belgian artist Jean-Michel Folon, while the rear sleeve includes a picture of Davies taken by American photographer Bob Gruen. Musician John Mendelsohn, who had assembled the track listing to The Kink Kronikles, wrote liner notes for The Great Lost Kinks Album which extensively derided Davies' contemporary songwriting when compared his 1966–69 period. For example, Mendelsohn writes that the Kinks' 1972 album Everybody's in Show-Biz features "a bitchy, egocentric Davies ... whose primary interest is making clear to his listener the agony he must endure to stay on the road entertaining us." The album's liner notes do not include writing credits for several songs, something Kitts ascribes to sloppiness in the LP's manufacturing. There are additionally discrepancies between song titles, which sometimes vary between the album's sleeve and central label, the lyrics as sung and the spelling used by later authors. (Note: "Til Death Do Us Part" is spelled as such on the album sleeve and on the LP's central label, but the film for which it was written is titled Till Death Us Do Part. Authors Andy Miller, Rogan and Hinman use the film's spelling in discussing the song.; "When I Turn Off the Living Room Light" is titled as such in Reprise's tape log and this is the lyric Davies sings in the song. The album instead lists the song as "When I Turn Out the Living Room Light", which Miller suggests was likely a clerical error on Reprise's part.; "Where Did the Spring Go?" is written on the album's rear sleeve, while the LP's label omits the question mark. Mendelsohn titles the song "Where Did My Spring Go?" in his liner notes, and this title is also used by Miller. Hinman and Kinks author Johnny Rogan use the "My" titling but alternate between including and omitting the question mark.)

The Great Lost Kinks Album, a US-only release, may not qualify as the rarest [Kinks release], but it remains one of the most sought-after Kinks Kollectables for the right reason – the music.

— Author Andy Neill, 2000

The album's sales were driven by fans of the Kinks' 1960s work who were excited over the rarity of its contents. It debuted at No. 165 on Billboard's Top LP's & Tape chart on 24 February 1973. It remained on the chart for five weeks, peaking at No. 145, and additionally reached No. 78 and No. 74 on Cash Box and Record World's charts, respectively. Davies remained unaware of the album until after its release; Hinman writes Davies first read about it in Billboard magazine, while author Thomas M. Kitts writes an American fan brought it to his attention after mailing him a copy of the LP. Davies initiated legal action against Reprise over its release, resulting in its 1975 deletion from the label's catalogue.

Despite the album's 1975 deletion and lack of a subsequent official CD release, it has remained popular among Kinks fans for its inclusion of rare and otherwise unobtainable tracks. The album received multiple bootleg releases in Japan in the 1990s. Into the early 2000s, the LP remained the only way of hearing several of its songs without resorting to bootlegging, before many were made available as bonus tracks on the 2004 CD reissue of The Kinks Are the Village Green Preservation Society.

== Critical reception ==
=== Contemporary reviews ===
Contemporary reviewers generally found the compilation uneven. A reviewer in Crawdaddy! magazine wrote it consisted of both "barrel-scraping" material and songs that would make the album a worthwhile purchase for Kinks fans. The reviewer negatively compared it to Reprise's 1972 compilation, The Kink Kronikles, writing that while both albums seemed similarly intentioned, The Great Lost Kinks Album "lacks both the bountifulness and dramatic highlights [of Kronikles]". Another magazine's reviewer wrote that the album's main value was for Kink fans who "don't mind wading through second-rate material to get to the occasional highspots". Writing for Rolling Stone magazine, Jim Miller says the album "basically represents dregs", while providing "a surprising number of undeservedly esoteric Kinks classics" that would satisfy fans unhappy with Davies and the Kinks' recent work. In Circus magazine, Ed Naha wrote that the album captures the band during their mid- to late 1960s peak, and that while it is generally not on the level of the band's best work, such as "Waterloo Sunset" (1967) or "Lola" (1970), its contents provides great insight into Davies. The Los Angeles Times's critic Terry Atkinson mentioned the same songs and "Victoria" (1969), writing that where The Kink Kronikles contained classics, the songs on The Great Lost Kinks Album are instead "trifling", while still better than the Kinks' most recent releases on RCA.

Several reviewers took notice of the Mendelsohn's liner notes and his criticism of the Kinks' contemporary work. Chuck Lowery of the newspaper The San Diego Door writes that The Great Lost Kinks Album is "really good", but considers it lesser than the band's 1972 album, Everybody's in Show-Biz, writing that Mendelsohn's attack on that album discredits his own writing. In his review of the album for Creem magazine, Ken Emerson characterised Mendelsohn's liner notes as querulous. In contrast to other reviewers, Emerson found the album a "marvelously" coherent package, evoking the same sadness heard on most of the Kinks' albums since 1966, with the happy songs instead "wistful thinking, pathetically evanescent fantasies". In a May 1974 interview with Circus, musician Lou Reed declared his love for the album and said he listened it any chance he could.

=== Retrospective assessment ===
Retrospective ratings
Review scores
Source	Rating
AllMusic	4.5/5 stars
Christgau's Record Guide	A–
The Encyclopedia of Popular Music	3/5 stars
MusicHound Rock	4/5
The New Rolling Stone Album Guide	3.5/5 stars

Among retrospective reviewers, Robert Christgau declared that though the album consists mostly of B-sides and outtakes, it is the Kinks' best album to be released in the 1970s, something he thinks speaks to "the limitations of the Kinks' professional renaissance". He writes the album's "[f]ragile, unkempt, [and] whimsical" content focuses on the "harmless eccentrics" which made up Davies' best songwriting. Richie Unterberger of AllMusic opines that much of album would have fit well on The Kinks Are the Village Green Preservation Society. He finds The Great Lost Kinks Album lyrically weaker than the band's other late 1960s work, but counts "Rosemary Rose" "Misty Water" and "Mr. Songbird" as the highlights. Unterberger concludes that the album would prove "quite worthwhile" to Kinks fans, as does Rob Sheffield in The New Rolling Stone Album Guide (2004), who describes several of its tracks as "essential cult items", including "The Way Love Used to Be", "Rosemary Rose" and "When I Turn Out the Living Room Light". In a Rolling Stone piece ranking the band's albums, Sheffield categorises it as for "further listening", just below the level of "must-have".

== Track listing ==
All tracks are written by Ray Davies, except where noted. (Note: Writing credits are per Doug Hinman. When "There Is No Life Without Love" was first released as the B-side to "Lincoln County", it was credited to Dave and Ray Davies. On the 2011 compilation album Hidden Treasures, it is instead credited to only Dave Davies.)

=== Side one ===
No.	Title	Current Availability	Length
1.	"Til Death Do Us Part"	The Kinks Are the Village Green Preservation Society (50th Anniversary Edition)	3:12
2.	"There is No Life Without Love" (Dave Davies, R. Davies)	B side to "Lincoln County"; Arthur (Or the Decline and Fall of the British Empire) (50th Anniversary Edition)	1:55
3.	"Lavender Hill"	The Kinks Are the Village Green Preservation Society (50th Anniversary Edition)	2:53
4.	"Groovy Movies"	Arthur (Or the Decline and Fall of the British Empire) (50th Anniversary Edition)	2:30
5.	"Rosemary Rose"	The Kinks Are the Village Green Preservation Society (50th Anniversary Edition)	1:43
6.	"Misty Water"	The Kinks Are the Village Green Preservation Society (50th Anniversary Edition)	3:01
7.	"Mr. Songbird"	The Kinks Are the Village Green Preservation Society (50th Anniversary Edition)	2:24

=== Side two ===
No.	Title	Current Availability	Length
1.	"When I Turn Out the Living Room Light"	The Kinks Are the Village Green Preservation Society (50th Anniversary Edition)	2:17
2.	"The Way Love Used to Be"	Percy	2:11
3.	"I'm Not Like Everybody Else"	B side to "Sunny Afternoon"; The Journey, Pt. 1 (CD and Digital Versions)	3:29
4.	"Plastic Man"	Non album single; Arthur (Or the Decline and Fall of the British Empire) (50th Anniversary Edition)	3:00
5.	"This Man He Weeps Tonight" (D. Davies)	B side to "Shangri-La"; Arthur (Or the Decline and Fall of the British Empire) (50th Anniversary Edition)	2:38
6.	"Pictures in the Sand"	The Kinks Are the Village Green Preservation Society (50th Anniversary Edition)	2:45
7.	"Where Did the Spring Go?"	The Kinks Are the Village Green Preservation Society (50th Anniversary Edition)	2:10

Notes

- Song titles vary between the album sleeve, the LP's central label, the lyrics as sung and the spelling used by later authors. The titles are listed above as they were on the rear of the album's sleeve.

== Personnel ==
According to band researcher Doug Hinman, except where noted:

The Kinks

- Ray Davies – lead vocal; acoustic and electric guitars; keyboards; producer (except "I'm Not Like Everybody Else")
- Dave Davies – backing vocal; electric guitar; lead vocal ("There Is No Life Without Love", "Groovy Movies", "I'm Not Like Everybody Else", "This Man He Weeps Tonight")
- Pete Quaife – bass (except "The Way Love Used to Be"); backing vocal, co-lead vocal ("There Is No Life Without Love")
- John Dalton – bass ("The Way Love Used to Be")
- John Gosling – piano ("The Way Love Used to Be")
- Mick Avory – drums; backing vocal ("Plastic Man"); tambourine ("Groovy Movies", "This Man He Weeps Tonight")
- Unidentified (played by the Kinks) – banjo ("Til Death Do Us Part"); harmonica ("Pictures in the Sand")

Additional musicians

- Rasa Davies – backing vocal ("Til Death Do Us Part")
- Nicky Hopkins – piano ("Misty Water", "Mr. Songbird", "Pictures in the Sand"); Mellotron ("Mr. Songbird"); harpsichord ("There Is No Life Without Love", "Rosemary Rose"); organ ("Misty Water") (Note: Hinman writes Hopkins "possibly" played organ on "Misty Waters", but raises the possibility Ray Davies played it. Miller writes both "Misty Water" and "Pictures in the Sand" include organ but he does not specify who played the instrument in either case.)
- Stanley Myers – string arrangement ("The Way Love Used to Be")
- Lew Warburton – horn arrangement ("Groovy Movies")
- Unidentified session musicians – trombone ("Til Death Do Us Part"); horn section ("Groovy Movies"); string section ("The Way Love Used to Be")

Additional production

- Mike Bobak – engineer ("When I Turn Out the Living Room Light")
- Andrew Hendriksen – engineer ("Groovy Movies", "This Man He Weeps Tonight")
- Brian Humphries – engineer
- Vic Maile – engineer
- Alan MacKenzie – engineer ("There's No Life Without Love")
- Shel Talmy – producer ("I'm Not Like Everybody Else")
- Unidentified engineer – engineer ("When I Turn Out the Living Room Light", "Where Did the Spring Go?")

Additional personnel

- John Cabalka – design
- Jean-Michel Folon – illustration
- Bob Gruen – photography
- John Mendelsohn – liner notes

== Charts ==
Weekly chart performance
Chart (1973)	Peak position
US Billboard Top LP's & Tape	145
US Cash Box Top 100 Albums	78
US Record World Album Chart	74
