= Assault on Precinct 13 =

Assault on Precinct 13 may refer to:

- Assault on Precinct 13 (1976 film), an American action thriller by John Carpenter
- Assault on Precinct 13 (2005 film), American/French remake by Jean-François Richet
- Assault on Precinct 13 (soundtrack), the soundtrack to the 1976 film
