= The Hard Way (The Kinks song) =

Single by The Kinks

from the album Schoolboys in Disgrace
- A-side: "No More Looking Back" (UK); "I'm in Disgrace" (US)
- Released: January 23, 1976 (UK)
- Recorded: September 22, 1975 at Konk Studios, London
- Genre: Hard rock
- Length: 2:35
- Label: RCA
- Songwriter: Ray Davies
- Producer: Ray Davies

The Kinks singles chronology
"You Can't Stop the Music" (1975)	"The Hard Way" (1976)	"Sleepwalker" (1977)

"The Hard Way" is a song written by Ray Davies and first released by the Kinks on their 1975 album Schoolboys in Disgrace. It was also released on the Kinks live album One for the Road and on several greatest hits collections. The Knack covered the song on their 1980 album ...But the Little Girls Understand.

== Lyrics and music ==
The lyrics of "The Hard Way" were inspired by a real life incident that happened to Dave Davies, Ray's brother and the Kinks' guitarist. In the incident, Dave Davies was caned and expelled from William Grimshaw Secondary Modern School after cutting class and having sex with a classmate. On Schoolboys in Disgrace, a three song sequence beginning with "I'm in Disgrace", continuing through "Headmaster" and concluding with "The Hard Way" covers a similar event in the life of the song's narrator Flash. "I'm in Disgrace" covers Flash's feelings about getting his girlfriend pregnant and in "Headmaster" Flash confesses his misdeeds to the headmaster and asks for mercy.

In "The Hard Way", the headmaster responds to the plea in the previous song. He berates and browbeats Flash. He starts by singing that "Boys like you were born to waste", later singing that he is not fit to be anything more than a street sweeper. Allmusic critic Richard Gilliam sees the headmaster as a bigot who "believes that punishment and destruction of self-image are important elements in learning". Author Thomas Kitts perceives a "psychosexual enjoyment" in the headmaster's words. Some of the lyrics, including the title, can be taken as double entendres.

The music of the song is driven by a Dave Davies' power chord guitar riff, reminiscent of older Kinks songs such as "All Day and All of the Night" and "You Really Got Me". Kitts believes that Davies' guitar part "mirrors the headmaster's sexual aggression". Gilliam describes the percussion beat as "harsh". Gilliam believes that opening riffs of "The Hard Way" were an influence on the sound of Devo.

== Recording ==
"The Hard Way" was recorded on September 22, 1975, at Konk Studios in London. Trombone overdubs were added on October 2, with John Beecham playing the trombone.

== Live performances ==
During the Schoolboys in Disgrace tour, the band performed in costume. For "The Hard Way", lead singer Ray Davies wore a black gown and a grotesque mask, which had a long nose which Kitts compares to a phallus. Kinks drummer Mick Avory was "whipped" on stage at some performances of the song. At other performances, women on stage danced with canes. A live performance of "The Hard Way" was included on One for the Road.

== The Knack version ==
"The Hard Way"

Song by The Knack

from the album ...But the Little Girls Understand
- Released: February 15, 1980
- Recorded: December 1979
- Studio: MCA-Whitney Studios, Glendale, California
- Length: 2:45
- Label: Capitol Records
- Songwriter: Ray Davies
- Producer: Mike Chapman

In 1980, the Knack covered "The Hard Way" for their second album, ...But the Little Girls Understand, in 1980. High Fidelity called it the best song on the album and an "honest homage to the Kinks", but claimed that it is "still a pale replica of the original" that doesn't add anything new. In his scathing review of ...But the Little Girls Understand, Jim Sullivan of the Bangor Daily News found it unsurprising that the Knack would play this song, given that the song is "concerned with dominance and submission".
