= I'm in Disgrace =

Single by The Kinks

from the album Schoolboys in Disgrace
- B-side: "The Hard Way"
- Released: 21 January 1976 (US)
- Recorded: 19 August 1975 – 24 September 1975 at Konk Studios, London
- Genre: Hard rock; rock and roll
- Length: 3:21
- Label: RCA
- Songwriter: Ray Davies
- Producer: Ray Davies

The Kinks singles chronology
"You Can't Stop the Music" (1975)	"I'm in Disgrace" (1976)	"No More Looking Back" (1976)

"I'm in Disgrace" is the opening track on the second side of the Kinks' 1975 concept album, Schoolboys in Disgrace. It was written by Ray Davies.

== Background ==
"I'm in Disgrace" plays an important role in the plot line of Schoolboys in Disgrace lyrically, as it describes the main character, Jack (a young Mr. Flash), being publicly disgraced for his inappropriate behavior with his former girlfriend. According to Jack, the first two times that he saw her, he was in love with the girl, but because he was treated "with such distaste" the third time, he now wishes he'd "never seen [her] face." Now, because he "fell for [her] pretty face", he's "in disgrace" and his "name's dirt." However, he claims that "it wasn't lust, it wasn't rape, it was just a mistake" and says to his girlfriend that "There's no use blaming me and saying I was your ruination Because it was you equally That got us into this situation." In the next track on the album, "Headmaster", he refers to the incident as he confesses to the headmaster that "I've been with those naughty little girls again, now those naughty little girls are going to put me to shame."

The lyrics in this track reference a moment in Ray Davies's brother and bandmate, Dave’s, youth. Davies was very rebellious, (the polar opposite of his introspective brother, Ray), and he often got into trouble. One time, as a fifteen-year-old, Davies was expelled from school after he was discovered having intercourse with Sue Sheehan, his girlfriend at the time, on Hampstead Heath. The two were promptly separated by their families when Sue discovered she was pregnant. This event heavily influenced Dave's later songwriting, in songs such as "Funny Face", "Susannah's Still Alive", and "Mindless Child of Motherhood".

== Release and reception ==
"I'm in Disgrace" was the debut single from Schoolboys in Disgrace in America, where it was backed with "The Hard Way", a popular live track from the same album. It was, like many Kinks singles of this time period, unpopular, as it did not make a mark in the charts.

Despite its poor commercial showing, the track is often mentioned as one of the best tracks from Schoolboys in Disgrace. Paul Nelson of Rolling Stone said that "'I'm in Disgrace' is a terrific rock & roll song about erotic confusion and shame." AllMusic's Stephen Thomas Erlewine cited the track as a highlight from the album.

Cash Box said that "the tune starts out gently, the vocal warmly played out over a seemingly classical piano figure. Suddenly, falling into disgrace, the band slips into hard rock, with great backing vocals."
