= Village Green (song) =

1968 song by the Kinks

- 1969 Japanese single picture sleeve

Song by the Kinks

from the album The Kinks Are the Village Green Preservation Society
- Released: 22 November 1968
- Recorded: February 1967 (Note: Most sources write that the Kinks re-recorded the song entirely in February 1967. Miller raises the possibility the original recording from 24–25 November 1966 served as the basic track onto which the band overdubbed additions in February 1967.)
- Studio: Pye, London
- Genre: Pop; rock
- Length: 2:08
- Label: Pye
- Songwriter: Ray Davies
- Producer: Ray Davies (Note: Shel Talmy produced the song, but the liner notes of Village Green credit Ray Davies, who produced all of the album's other tracks. Mister Pleasant, an EP released in France in May 1967, credits Talmy.)

Official audio
- "Village Green" on YouTube

"Village Green" is a song by the English rock band the Kinks from their 1968 album The Kinks Are the Village Green Preservation Society. Written and sung by the band's principal songwriter, Ray Davies, the song was first recorded in November 1966 during the sessions for Something Else by the Kinks (1967) but was re-recorded in February 1967. Both the composition and instrumentation of "Village Green" evoke Baroque music, especially its prominently featured harpsichord played by the session keyboardist Nicky Hopkins. Unlike most of the band's late 1960s recordings, it employs real orchestral instruments, including oboe, cello, viola and piccolo, as arranged by the English composer David Whitaker.

Davies composed "Village Green" in August 1966 after an experience at a pub in Devon, a rural part of England. The song laments the decline of a fictional English community's traditional village green. Retrospective commentators place the song in the tradition of English pastoral poetry, particularly its themes of rural living and a declining English culture. After the song's recording, Davies withheld it from release while deciding whether to include it on a solo album or as part of a Kinks project. It served as one of the central inspirations for The Kinks Are the Village Green Preservation Society and was the album's title track until only a few months before its release. The song was first issued in the United Kingdom on that album in November 1968, but it saw earlier release on a French EP in May 1967 as well as on a similar Spanish EP. The song was not played live until a Ray Davies solo show in 1995, though the Kinks had performed an instrumental version in 1973.

== Background and inspiration ==
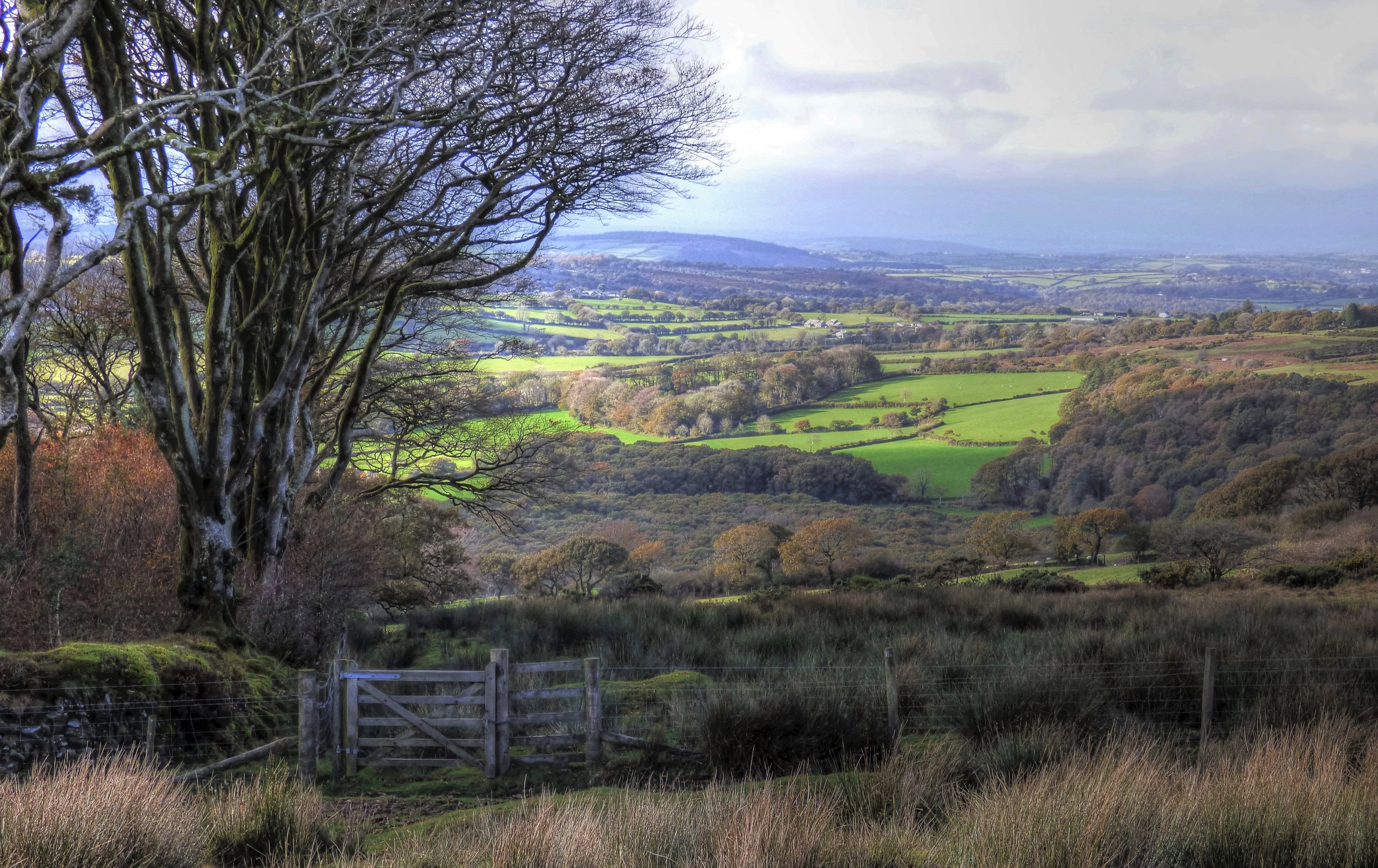
A 1966 visit to the rural English county of Devon (pictured in 2020) inspired Ray Davies to compose "Village Green".

In July 1965, the Kinks were informally blacklisted from performing in the United States by the American Federation of Musicians. The circumstances that led to the ban are unclear but likely stemmed from several incidents during the band's 1965 US tour; Ray Davies, the Kinks' bandleader, later attributed it to a combination of "bad luck, bad management, [and] bad behaviour". (Note: On 2 July 1965, while backstage of Dick Clark's show Where the Action Is, Davies fought a member of the American Federation of Television and Radio Artists. Two days later, the Kinks refused to perform a concert in San Francisco after the promoter declined Davies's request that the band be paid in cash. The ban persisted until Davies negotiated its resolution in mid-April 1969.) Music critic Ian MacDonald suggests the ban left the group comparatively isolated from American influence, guiding them away from their earlier blues-based riffing towards a distinctly English songwriting style. In early 1966, Davies grew obsessed with aspects of English aristocracy and the country's dying traditions. He expressed his pride of Britain in an April 1966 interview with Melody Maker magazine, wishing its culture could remain distinct from that of America and Europe, as well as a desire to keep writing "very English songs".

Davies likely composed "Village Green" around 16 August 1966, the same day the Kinks played at Torquay Town Hall in Devon, a rural part of England. He later recalled the song spawning from his disappointment after finding out the beer at a Devon pub was stored in a pressurised metal keg rather than in a traditional wooden barrel. Davies explained in a 1974 interview: "I notice the difference. Some wouldn't. But it doesn't get you in the legs anymore ..." (Note: In the same 1974 interview with Rolling Stone, Ray connected the pub story to the album's "original song, 'Village Green Preservation Society'", which he said was written "about eight years ago". Hinman and Hasted each write Ray meant "Village Green".) He also observed an encroachment of Devon's country landscape by more modern buildings. Davies may have been further inspired by the small town of Oakham, where the Kinks played a benefit four days later. He was also inspired by Under Milk Wood, a radio drama about a small Welsh town completed by the poet Dylan Thomas just before his death in 1953.

== Recording ==
External videos
- "Village Green" (Alternate Vocal)
- "Village Green" (Orchestral Overdub)

The Kinks first recorded "Village Green" on 24–25 November 1966, at the beginning of the sessions for their next album, Something Else by the Kinks (1967). Recording took place in Pye Studio 2, one of two basement studios at Pye Records's London offices. The tracks for Something Else done in late 1966 went unused, and the band reconvened at Pye in early 1967 to re-record several songs. It is unclear if any parts of the released version of "Village Green" use the November 1966 recordings; author Rob Jovanovic writes that all the November 1966 recordings, including "Village Green", were "early versions" and demos. In his 1994 autobiography, Davies writes that the song was re-recorded entirely in February 1967. After acknowledging Davies's account, band biographer Andy Miller raises the possibility that the November 1966 recording served as the basic track onto which the band overdubbed additions in February 1967.

The Kinks' long-time producer, Shel Talmy, produced the sessions for "Village Green", which occurred before the breakdown of his relationship with Davies in April 1967. Session keyboardist Nicky Hopkins, who had contributed to each of the Kinks' studio albums since The Kink Kontroversy in 1965, played the song's prominently featured harpsichord. "Village Green" is one of two tracks on The Kinks Are the Village Green Preservation Society to feature real strings, a rarity on the Kinks' late 1960s recordings since Pye executives generally saw the hiring of an arranger and session players as too expensive to warrant. Davies dictated his ideas for the strings to English composer David Whitaker, who arranged the orchestral accompaniment. It features oboe, cello, viola and piccolo, all played by session musicians.

As was typical for Davies at that time, he remained secretive with his bandmates about the song during the rehearsal and recording process. While recording the basic track, he advised drummer Mick Avory that it was a soul song and that he should play like Al Jackson Jr., drummer of R&B singer Otis Redding. He later recalled that it was only after they overdubbed the orchestral arrangement and vocals that Avory realised "he'd been totally conned". Davies reflected that the event marked "how dysfunctional we'd become". Avory later suggested that Davies's reluctance to share lyrics and melodies with his bandmates stemmed from a paranoia that his songs would be stolen. Both Avory and bassist Pete Quaife recalled being annoyed by the method, since it prevented them from easily adding fills and embellishments that fitted the song.

== Composition ==
=== Music ===
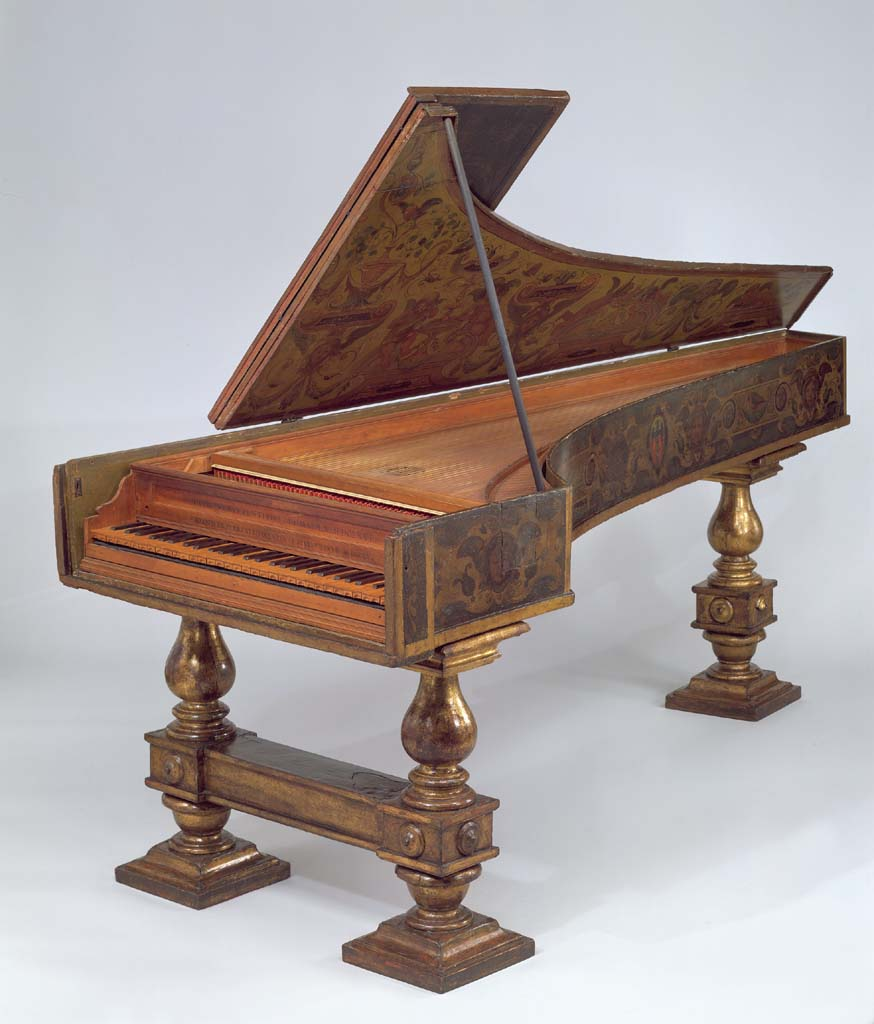
The recording prominently features a harpsichord, giving the song a Baroque-feel.

"Village Green" is in the key of C minor. The song employs a fifth-cyclic sequence and a descending chromatic chorus, elements which musicologist Allan F. Moore writes evoke the music of Baroque composer George Frideric Handel. Moore thinks the relationship to Handel is further emphasised by the presence of a harpsichord, an instrument which band biographer Johnny Rogan writes helps develop the song's drama. Musicologist Matthew Prichard writes that the song's composition and instrumentation combine to make it "perhaps the nearest a pop song ever got to becoming a Baroque obbligato aria".

Like many of the Kinks' songs, its chorus features wordless backing vocals, an element which cultural researcher Raphael Costambeys-Kempczynski writes evokes "carefree childhood". Academic Ken Rayes thinks the orchestral instruments are suggestive of a distant time and place, while band biographer Thomas M. Kitts writes the song's abrupt ending suggests a loss of the past.

=== Lyrics ===
The song's lyrics lament the decline of a fictional English community's traditional village green. The singer remembers the green in his memory as somewhere he misses but expects to have changed since he left it, mourning the town's invasion by American tourists and the community's cheapening atmosphere. He recalls leaving the village green to seek out fame and life in the city. He further remembers it as the place he left his romantic love, Daisy, who has since married Tom, a former grocer's boy who now runs a larger grocery. He declares that he will return to Daisy so they can reminisce over tea about the village green as it was.

Rogan sees "Village Green" and the album's title track, "The Village Green Preservation Society", as the most prominent example of a device Davies uses on the album, where pairs of songs explore similar themes but use different moods and contrasting musical arrangements to do so. (Note: "Village Green" opened side two on the original twelve-track edition of the album, which musicologist Matthew Gelbart writes would have further emphasised its contrast with the opening track.) He writes that while "Village Green" covers similar thematic elements in its "simplistic glorification of daisies, clocks and steeples", it instead satirises the more optimistic sentiments expressed in the title track. He characterises "Village Green" as comparatively solemn, Davies singing in a defeated tone to generate a sense of pathos.

Like other songs on the album, "Village Green" relates to both escapism and the supremacy of rural living. Historian Andrew Kellett describes it as one of several rock songs of the period fitting in a tradition of "British rock pastoralism", expressing a desire to escape urban and suburban life. The song suggests that this traditional way of English life has slowly died off, anticipating what Kitts terms the "bleak years of the 1970s". The community's value no longer consists in its original purpose but is instead photographed by American tourists as a symbol of a past England. (Note: Costambeys-Kempczynski writes that the song furthers the album's theme of photography. Other songs on the album dealing with photography are "Picture Book" and "People Take Pictures of Each Other", the latter of which references the oak tree in "Village Green".) Costambeys-Kempczynski sees the song as expressing the "nature of Englishness", the culture of which "[marches] backwards into the future" by always seeing change as for the worse.

Miller connects the song to the tradition of English pastoral poetry, particularly in its story of a disappearing rural idyll. He describes it as typical of the genre, especially in its evocation of literal imagery like oak trees and church steeples to suggest a loss of innocence. He compares it to other examples of the genre, like William Blake's poem "The Echoing Green" from his Songs of Innocence (1789), William Wordsworth's "Michael" (1800) and Oliver Goldsmith's "The Deserted Village" (1770). He suggests the closing lyric about Daisy represents a self-delusion that the singer can return to things as they were, while author Joseph G. Marotta instead writes the idea of returning to see Daisy only remains the singer's hope or fantasy. Rayes thinks the song and its album are comparable to F. Scott Fitzgerald's 1925 novel The Great Gatsby, a relationship he suggests is hinted at in "Village Green" by the presence of the characters Tom and Daisy, who have the same names as the novel's characters Tom and Daisy Buchanan. Rayes writes that Davies's notion of "an encroaching modern English culture" parallels the novel's motifs of "mythic America and the changing American dream".

== Release ==
After recording "Village Green", Davies withheld it from immediate release. He remained uncertain whether to include it on a solo album or Kinks project, a reluctance which may have stemmed from the song's personal content. On 6 March 1967, a press release announcing a Kinks EP for the following month included "Village Green" among its tracks, but the EP was ultimately not issued. (Note: The EP's proposed track listing was "Two Sisters", "Mr. Reporter", "Village Green", "And I Will Love You" and "This is Where I Belong".) An acetate disc from around April 1967 paired the song with "Waterloo Sunset" for a potential single, but Davies replaced "Village Green" with a different B-side before "Waterloo Sunset" was released as a single the following month. Pye first issued "Village Green" on the French EP Mister Pleasant in May 1967 and also featured it on a similar Spanish EP released before Village Green. (Note: The Kinks' song "Mister Pleasant" was briefly planned for a single release in the UK, but was passed over for "Waterloo Sunset". "Mister Pleasant" was still issued as a single in the Netherlands however, backed with "This is Where I Belong". As EPs were the dominant music format in France at that time, Pye added "Village Green" and "Two Sisters" to the Dutch single to make it a four song EP.)

Though "Village Green" was recorded during the sessions for Something Else by the Kinks, Davies did not release it on that album in September 1967. Additionally, when the Kinks' American recording contract required them to submit songs in June 1968 for a new album (the later-aborted Four More Respected Gentlemen), Davies did not include it among the fifteen tracks he sent to Reprise Records. Band researcher Doug Hinman writes that around the same time, in early June 1968, Davies's plans for a solo LP and the Kinks' next album had "[slowly] mutated into one" under the expected title Village Green. The song served as one of the album's central inspirations, and Village Green remained its working title until August 1968, at which time Davies composed a new title track, "The Village Green Preservation Society".

Davies included "Village Green" on his original twelve-track edition of The Kinks Are the Village Green Preservation Society as the opening track of side two. In the United Kingdom, Pye initially planned for a 27 September 1968 release of the album, though Davies opted to halt its release in mid-September to expand its track listing. (Note: Release of the twelve-track LP went ahead in Sweden and Norway on 9 October 1968, with subsequent releases of that edition following in France, Italy and New Zealand.) Pye released the fifteen-track edition of the album in the UK on 22 November 1968. "Village Green" is the second track on side two, between "Animal Farm" and "Starstruck".

== Reception and legacy ==
In his September 1968 preview of Village Green for New Musical Express magazine, critic Keith Altham wrote that "Village Green" is "full of the sound of country fetes, maypoles and garden parties"; the song's string section is written for music enthusiasts, while its sad story is for those who prefer lyrics. The reviewer for Disc and Music Echo counted "Village Green" as one of the most memorable songs on the album. In a retrospective assessment, J. H. Tompkins of Pitchfork suggests the song displayed the increasing disconnect between the Kinks and the broader rock world, contrasting its understated style against the "bombastic, urban" sound of the Rolling Stones' "Sympathy for the Devil". In his ranking of the album's tracks, Morgan Enos of Billboard magazine placed the song fourth, describing it as the "beating heart of the album" and "a beautiful tension between the future and the past". He writes that the song's joining of romance for rural life works well with its use of classical instruments. Among band biographers, Kitts writes that it is both one the album's highlights and "one of Davies's quiet masterpieces", joining "deceptively simple lyrics and a simple inescapable melody to reveal great emotional depth". By contrast, Miller thinks the song lacks the depth of "The Village Green Preservation Society" while also featuring a cluttered arrangement.

The Kinks performed an instrumental rendition of "Village Green" in concert on 14 January 1973 at Theatre Royal, Drury Lane, augmented by additional singers and a brass section. The show marked the earliest iteration of Davies's attempt at a theatrical presentation of Village Green, a project he titled Preservation. Davies first played the song live on 12 April 1995 during a solo show, and he included it in the set list of his August 1995 UK tour.

Edgar Wright and Simon Pegg included the song in their 2007 film Hot Fuzz. The song plays over a scene which helps establish a superficially charming village, the residents of which murder anyone who threatens to ruin its beauty. Historian Carey Fleiner comments that the song's use in the film captures the cynicism Davies originally intended to convey.

== Personnel ==
According to Doug Hinman and Andrew Sandoval:

The Kinks

- Ray Davies – vocals, acoustic guitar
- Dave Davies – backing vocals, electric guitar
- Pete Quaife – backing vocals, bass guitar
- Mick Avory – drums

Additional musicians

- Nicky Hopkins – harpsichord
- Unidentified session musicians – bassoon, oboe, strings
