= Two Sisters (The Kinks song) =

- B-side label of US single

Single by the Kinks

from the album Something Else by The Kinks
- A-side: "Waterloo Sunset"
- Released: 26 July 1967
- Recorded: February 1967
- Studio: Pye, London
- Genre: English folk
- Length: 2:01
- Label: Reprise
- Songwriter: Ray Davies
- Producer: Ray Davies

The Kinks US singles chronology
"Dead End Street" (1966)	"Waterloo Sunset" / "Two Sisters" (1967)	"Autumn Almanac" (1967)

"Two Sisters" is the third track from the Kinks' 1967 album, Something Else by the Kinks. The song was written by Ray Davies.

== Lyrics ==
In "Two Sisters", the singer compares sisters Sybilla and Priscilla. Sybilla is a swinging, single "wayward lass", while Priscilla is a married housewife who, while initially jealous of her sister's more exciting life, comes to appreciate her domestic life. The two characters in the lyrics of "Two Sisters" (Sybilla and Priscilla) were inspired by Ray Davies and his brother, Dave Davies. Ray was more introverted (and was the only one of the two married) while Dave was a party animal who was very outgoing. This clash of personalities was often the cause of many band in-fights, which would come out in their songs (ex. "Dandy", which is often thought to be about Dave).

Dave made up for both of us, he was the youthful, fun-loving one. 'Two Sisters' is quite accurate, in the sense that one had all the freedoms - one brother stays in, and the other goes out and has fun. And one resents the other for the ability to do it. But in the end, look what I've got...

— Ray Davies

== Music ==
"Two Sisters", sung by Ray Davies, is notable for its use of harpsichord (which was also used in the song "Village Green", a song recorded around the same time, but saved for The Kinks Are the Village Green Preservation Society). It was also the first time strings were used in a Kinks track.

== Release and reception ==
"Two Sisters" saw release in May 1967, on both the French EP, "Mister Pleasant", and as the American B-side of "Waterloo Sunset". Later that year, it appeared on the album Something Else by the Kinks. The track has since appeared on Picture Book.

AllMusic's Stephen Thomas Erlewine said that the track was "allegorical" and a "stunner".

Although never a regular part of their live set, the group did perform the song (live vocals over backing track) on the BBC2 TV show Colour Me Pop in July 1968.

== Personnel ==
According to band researcher Doug Hinman, except where noted:

The Kinks

- Ray Davies – lead and backing vocals
- Dave Davies – backing vocal, electric guitar
- Pete Quaife – backing vocal, bass
- Mick Avory – drums

Additional musicians

- Nicky Hopkins – harpsichord
- David Whitaker – string arrangement
- Unnamed session musicians – cello and viola
