= In the Mouth of Madness (soundtrack) =

1995 film soundtrack album

Film score by John Carpenter & Jim Lang
- Released: 1995
- Genres: Ambient, dark ambient, Film score
- Length: 59:34
- Label: DRG Records
- Producers: John Carpenter, Jim Lang

John Carpenter chronology
Body Bags (1993)	In the Mouth of Madness (1995)	Village of the Damned (1995)

Jim Lang chronology
Body Bags (1993)	In the Mouth of Madness (1995)	Hey Arnold! (1996)

In the Mouth of Madness is a soundtrack by John Carpenter and Jim Lang for the film In the Mouth of Madness (1995).

== Development and release ==
The film's main theme, heard during the opening credits, was inspired by the Metallica song "Enter Sandman". Carpenter had originally wanted to use the song, but was unable to secure the rights and instead composed his own theme, with the help of composer Jim Lang and guitarist Dave Davies of The Kinks. It was released in 1995, through DRG Records. "In the Mouth of Madness", the first track off the soundtrack is hard rock mixed with ambient music and dark ambient. A remastering of the soundtrack was released on June 26, 2026.

== Track listing ==
All music is composed by John Carpenter & Jim Lang, except as noted.

No.	Title	Length
1.	"In the Mouth of Madness" (writers: Dave Davies, Carpenter, Lang)	5:26
2.	"Robby's Office"	2:28
3.	"Axe Man"	2:03
4.	"Bookstore Creep"	0:50
5.	"The Alley Nightmare"	0:58
6.	"Trent Makes the Map"	2:12
7.	"A Boy and His Bike"	3:05
8.	"Don't Look Down"	1:14
9.	"Hobb's End"	2:16
10.	"Pickman Hotel"	1:10
11.	"The Picture Changes"	2:18
12.	"The Black Church"	4:49
13.	"You're Wrong, Trent"	1:41
14.	"Mommy's Day"	3:04
15.	"Do You Like My Ending?"	2:03
16.	"I'm Losing Me"	3:07
17.	"Main Street"	4:36
18.	"Hobb's End Escape"	2:22
19.	"The Portal Opens"	3:06
20.	"The Old Ones Return"	2:28
21.	"The Book Comes Back"	4:02
22.	"Madness Outside"	0:32
23.	"Just a Bedtime Story"	3:44
Total length:		59:34

== Personnel ==
- John Carpenter – synthesizers, samples, voices, guitar on "Robby's Office", production
- Jim Lang – synthesizers, samples, voices, percussion, synthesizer programming, sound design, production, mixing
- Dave Davies – guitar solos on "In the Mouth of Madness"
- Josh Sklair – guitar on "In the Mouth of Madness"
- Dennis Belfield – bass on "In the Mouth of Madness"
- Mike Baird – drums on "In the Mouth of Madness"
- John Vigran – mixing
