= Schoolboys in Disgrace =

Studio album by the Kinks
- Released: 17 November 1975
- Recorded: 13 August – 2 October 1975
- Studio: Konk, London
- Genre: Rock and roll; hard rock; pop; doo-wop; arena rock
- Length: 36:26
- Label: RCA
- Producer: Ray Davies

The Kinks chronology
Soap Opera (1975)	Schoolboys in Disgrace (1975)	Sleepwalker (1977)

Singles from Schoolboys in Disgrace
- 1. "I'm in Disgrace" Released: 21 January 1976 (US); 2. "No More Looking Back" Released: 23 January 1976 (UK)

Schoolboys in Disgrace, or The Kinks Present Schoolboys in Disgrace, is a 1975 concept album by the Kinks. Their fifteenth studio album, it was considered by critics to be the last album in what they dubbed the group's "theatrical" period, and their final release for RCA Records. The album is rooted in 1950s rock and roll, and also includes elements of hard rock, '50s pop and doo-wop, and arena rock.

The front cover was illustrated by London artist and illustrator, Colin "Mickey" Finn (not of T. Rex), who also created the two removal men characters used in the Dire Straits video "Money for Nothing". It later appeared on NME's list of the '50 worst covers of all time'.

In 1978 the Finnish band Kontra had a number-one hit with the song "Jerry Cotton", which was a cover version of the song "Jack the Idiot Dunce".

== Concept ==
According to the back cover liner notes, the story which the album presents is as follows:

Once upon a time there was a naughty little schoolboy. He and his gang were always playing tricks on the teachers and bullying other children in the school. One day he got himself into very serious trouble with a naughty schoolgirl and he was sent to the Headmaster who decided to disgrace the naughty boy and his gang in front of the whole school.
After this punishment the boy turned into a hard and bitter character. Perhaps it was not the punishment that changed him but the fact that he realised people in authority would always be there to kick him down and the Establishment would always put him in his place. He knew that he could not change the past but he vowed that in the future he would always get what he wanted. The naughty little boy grew up... into Mr Flash.

Mr Flash was the name of the villain from the Kinks' rock opera Preservation (released as Preservation Act 1 and Preservation Act 2).

== Reception ==
Professional ratings
Review scores
Source	Rating
AllMusic	2/5 stars
Blender	3/5 stars
Christgau's Record Guide	C+
Rolling Stone	(mixed)
Sounds	5/5 stars

Reviewing in Christgau's Record Guide: Rock Albums of the Seventies (1981), Robert Christgau regarded the album as "yet another original cast recording" and mocked Davies' indictment of "Education" in the "big production number" of the same name: "Ultimate Cause. Go get 'em, Ray."

Stephen Thomas Erlewine writing for AllMusic criticised the album's combination of '50s rock and roll and contemporary arena rock, and deemed it "one of their least satisfying albums".

In 2015, the band's guitarist Dave Davies spoke positively of the album in a Yahoo interview, saying, "Schoolboys in Disgrace is a great album. At the time, we were so busy doing it and getting it out and touring and playing it. Over a matter of three years it was gone and we were doing something else. But when you draw this into the present, it’s like, 'Oh my God, what the f— is this?!? How did we do that?' We've been very fortunate, Ray and I and the Kinks. We’ve had such a wealth of materials, ideas, and observations. We’ve been very good at following our intuition. That's something you can’t really teach."

== Track listing ==
All tracks are written by Ray Davies.

Side one
No.	Title	Length
1.	"Schooldays"	3:31
2.	"Jack the Idiot Dunce"	3:19
3.	"Education"	7:07
4.	"The First Time We Fall in Love"	4:01

Side two
No.	Title	Length
1.	"I'm in Disgrace"	3:21
2.	"Headmaster"	4:03
3.	"The Hard Way"	2:35
4.	"The Last Assembly"	2:45
5.	"No More Looking Back"	4:27
6.	"Finale"	1:02

== Personnel ==
The Kinks

- Ray Davies – vocals, guitar, piano
- Dave Davies – lead guitar, vocals
- John Dalton – bass guitar
- Mick Avory – drums
- John Gosling – keyboards

Additional personnel

- Alan Holmes – saxophones
- Nick Newell – tenor saxophone
- John Beecham – trombone
- Pamela Travis – background vocals
- Debbie Doss – background vocals
- Shirley Roden – background vocals
- Written, arranged and produced by Raymond Douglas Davies
- Roger Wake – engineer
- Bob Ludwig – mastering
- Mickey Finn – front cover illustration
- Chris Hopper – photography
- Pat Doyle – art direction

== Charts ==
Chart (1975–1976)	Peak position
Dutch Albums (Album Top 100)	18
US Billboard 200	45
