= Ghosts of Mars (soundtrack) =

2001 film soundtrack album

Soundtrack album by John Carpenter
- Released: 2001
- Studios: Cherokee Studios, Hollywood
- Genres: Heavy metal; film score
- Length: 42:59
- Label: Varèse Sarabande
- Producer: Bruce Robb

John Carpenter chronology
Vampires (1998)	Ghosts of Mars (2001)	Assault on Precinct 13 (2003)

Professional ratings
Review scores
Source	Rating
AllMusic	2.5/5 stars
Filmtracks	1.0/5 stars
SoundtrackNet	2.5/5 stars

Ghosts of Mars is a soundtrack by John Carpenter for the film of the same name. It was released in 2001 through Varèse Sarabande.

== Development ==
For the film's soundtrack, John Carpenter recorded a number of synthesizer pieces and assembled an all-star cast of guitarists (including thrash metal band Anthrax, virtuoso Steve Vai, genre spanning Buckethead, and former Guns N' Roses and Nine Inch Nails guitarist Robin Finck) to record an energetic and technically proficient heavy metal score. Reaction to the soundtrack was mixed; many critics praised the high standard of musicianship and the strong pairing of heavy metal riffs with the film's action sequences, but complained about the overlong guitar solos, the drastic differences between the cues used in the film and the full tracks, and the absence of any of the film's ambient synth score from the soundtrack CD.

== Track listing ==
All music is composed by John Carpenter.

No.	Title	Artist(s)	Length
1.	"Ghosts of Mars"	Steve Vai, Bucket Baker	3:42
2.	"Love Siege"	Anthrax, Buckethead, Robin Finck	4:37
3.	"Fight Train"	Anthrax. Robin Finck	3:16
4.	"Visions of Earth"	Elliot Easton	4:08
5.	"Slashing Void"	Elliot Easton	2:46
6.	"Kick Ass"	Anthrax, Buckethead	6:06
7.	"Power Station"	Anthrax, Robin Finck	4:37
8.	"Can't Let You Go"	Stone, Bruce Robb, Joe Robb	2:18
9.	"Dismemberment Blues"	Stone, Elliot Easton	2:53
10.	"Fightin' Mad"	Buckethead	2:41
11.	"Pam Grier's Head"	Anthrax, Elliot Easton	2:35
12.	"Ghost Poppin'"	Anthrax, Steve Vai, Robin Finck	3:20
Total length:			42:59

== Personnel ==
Anthrax

- Scott Ian – guitar
- Paul Crook – guitar
- Frank Bello – bass
- Charlie Benante – drums

Stone

- Brad Wilson – guitar
- Brian James – bass
- J.J. Garcia – drums

Additional personnel

- John Carpenter – composition, keyboards
- Steve Vai – guitar
- Buckethead – guitar
- Elliot Easton – guitar
- Robin Finck – guitar
- Bruce Robb – Fender Rhodes electric piano, production, mixing
- Joe Robb – saxophone
- Bucket Baker – percussion
- Robert Townson – executive producer
- Dee Robb – mixing
- The Great Tiago Becker – assistant engineer and editing
- Joseph Bishara – Pro Tools sound design
- Pat Sullivan-Fourstar – mastering
- Neil Jacobs – photography
