= No More Looking Back =

Single by The Kinks

from the album Schoolboys in Disgrace
- B-side: "Jack the Idiot Dunce", "The Hard Way"
- Released: 23 January 1976 (UK)
- Recorded: 19 August 1975 – 24 September 1975
- Studio: Konk Studios, London
- Genre: Rock
- Length: 4:27
- Label: RCA
- Songwriter: Ray Davies
- Producer: Ray Davies

The Kinks singles chronology
| "I'm in Disgrace" (1976) | "No More Looking Back" (1976) | "Sleepwalker" (1977) |

"No More Looking Back" is the penultimate track on the Kinks' 1975 concept album, Schoolboys in Disgrace. Like all of the other tracks on the album, it was written by Ray Davies.

== Background ==
Like the rest of the tracks on Schoolboys in Disgrace, "No More Looking Back" describes the back story of Mr. Flash, the main character from the Preservation saga. In the song, Flash is seen "walking along a crowded street", where he keeps "seeing the things that remind [him] of [his former lover]". He sees her every day, but she's "not really there 'cause [she belongs] to yesterday." Now, for Flash, there is "no more looking back". On Schoolboys in Disgrace, the track is second-to-last, only followed by the 1:04 long track "Finale", which borrows elements from "Education", another track on the album.

The track was released as a maxi-single in Britain (the only single from Schoolboys in Disgrace) with "Jack the Idiot Dunce" and "The Hard Way" (both album tracks from Schoolboys in Disgrace) on the B-side. The track was unsuccessful. However, it has since appeared as the only song from Schoolboys in Disgrace on the compilation album Picture Book.

Drummer Mick Avory noted the song as one that stylistically matched his drumming, commenting, "It's like something you didn't play full-out. It had nice parts to it and Ray always went into a nice sort of middle part that changed the feel of it and the interesting parts suited my playing at the time. I enjoyed that one."

== Reception ==
"No More Looking Back" has received mixed reviews. Rolling Stone's Paul Nelson spoke negatively of the track, saying that "'No More Looking Back' is no 'Waterloo Sunset'". However, Joe Tangari of Pitchfork Media was more approving of the song, saying in his review of the Picture Book album that "'No More Looking Back', is a cinematic preview of 90s Britpop, from Dave's harmonized lead guitar intro to Ray's perceptive lyrics about the way people who've left us linger in strange ways."

Drummer Mick Avory singled out the song as a favorite that often got overlooked, selecting it for inclusion on the compilation The Journey. Avory commented, "'No More Looking Back' was one of my favorites – I'd never seen it on a compilation. That was one of my choices."
