= I Will Be Me =

Studio album by Dave Davies
- Released: 4 June 2013
- Genre: Hard rock
- Length: 64:17
- Label: Cleopatra

Dave Davies chronology
Fractured Mindz (2007)	I Will Be Me (2013)

Professional ratings
Review scores
Source	Rating
Allmusic	3/5 stars

I Will Be Me is a solo album by Dave Davies, former member of The Kinks. It was released in June 2013.

== Track listing ==
1. "Little Green Amp"
2. "Livin' in the Past"
3. "The Healing Boy"
4. "Midnight in L.A."
5. "In the Mainframe"
6. "Energy Fields"
7. "When I First Saw You"
8. "The Actress"
9. "Erotic Neurotic"
10. "You Can Break My Heart"
11. "Walker Through the Worlds"
12. "Remember the Future"
13. "Cote du Rhone (I Will Be Me)"

== Personnel ==
- Scott Barnes – bass
- Matt Bennett – drums
- Oli Brown – guitar
- Azaria Byrne – vocals
- Jak Coleman – guitar
- Tom Currier – bass, piano
- Dave Davies – guitar, keyboards, vocals, background vocals
- Dennis Davison – maracas, organ
- Wesley Doyle – guitar
- Jürgen Engler – bass, guitar
- James Freemantle – bass
- Teddy Freese – drums
- Geri X – vocals
- Karen Grotberg – harpsichord, piano, vocals
- Chris Head – guitar
- Joey Horgen – guitar
- Simon Jackson – guitar
- Kara Jayne – bass
- Steve Kille – drums
- Jon Lamont – drums
- Mark Laughlin – drums
- Jonathan Lea – guitar, electric sitar
- Chris Lietz – drums
- Gary Louris – guitar, vocals
- Jordan McDonald – drums
- Sarah McLeod – guitar
- Tim O'Reagan – drums, percussion, vocals
- Mark Olson – vocals
- Marc Perlman – bass
- Wayne Proctor – drums
- Justin Sane – guitar, vocals
- Ty Segall – guitar, background vocals
- Jason Simon – guitar
- Chris Spedding – guitar
- Pat Thetic – drums
- Jon Tufnell – vocals
- Bruce Tyner – pedal steel guitar
- John Wesley – guitar
- Yura Zeleznik – violin
