= Village of the Damned (soundtrack) =

Village of The Damned

Film score by John Carpenter & Dave Davies
- Released: May 9, 1995
- Genre: Film score
- Length: 33:05
- Label: Varèse Sarabande
- Producer: The Robb Brothers

John Carpenter chronology
In the Mouth of Madness (1995)	Village of the Damned (1995)	Escape from L.A. (1996)

Dave Davies chronology
To the Bone (1994)	Village of the Damned (1995)	The Definitive Collection (1996)

Professional ratings
Review scores
Source	Rating
AllMusic	2.5/5 stars

Village of the Damned is a soundtrack by John Carpenter and Dave Davies for the 1995 film of the same name. It was released in 1995 through Varèse Sarabande.

== Track listing ==
All music is composed by John Carpenter & Dave Davies.

No.	Title	Length
1.	"March of the Children"	8:03
2.	"Children's Carol"	1:40
3.	"Angel of Death"	1:37
4.	"Daybreak"	1:12
5.	"The Fair"	1:32
6.	"The Children's Theme"	1:15
7.	"Ben's Death"	3:17
8.	"The Funeral"	1:54
9.	"Midwich Shuffle"	2:05
10.	"Baptism"	1:04
11.	"Burning Desire"	4:58
12.	"Welcome Home, Ben"	1:06
13.	"The Brick Wall"	3:22
Total length:		33:05

== Personnel ==
- John Carpenter – synthesizer, bass
- Dave Davies – acoustic guitars, electric guitars
- Bruce Robb – Hammond B-3 organ, music supervisor, production
- Paul Mirkovich – synthesizer, orchestra conductor
- Mark Hamill – voice over on "March of the Children"
- Charles Everett – concert master
- Robert Townson – executive producer
- Matthew Ellard – assistant engineer

Orchestra

- Xiao N. He
- Eun-Mee Ahn
- Michael P. Harrison
- Helaine Wittenber
- Miriam A. Mayer
- Glenn Grab
- Karl Vincent-Wickliff
