= I'm Not Like Everybody Else =

- UK B-side label

Single by the Kinks
- A-side: "Sunny Afternoon"
- Released: 3 June 1966
- Recorded: 12 May 1966
- Studio: Pye, London
- Genre: Rock, proto-punk
- Length: 3:29
- Label: Pye (UK); Reprise (US)
- Songwriter: Ray Davies
- Producer: Shel Talmy

The Kinks singles chronology
"Dedicated Follower of Fashion" (1966)	"Sunny Afternoon" / "I'm Not Like Everybody Else" (1966)	"Dead End Street" (1966)

"I'm Not Like Everybody Else" is a song written by Ray Davies and first recorded by the Kinks in 1966 and released that year as the B-side of "Sunny Afternoon". The lead vocal is sung by Dave Davies, with occasional parts vocalized by his brother Ray, the band's usual lead singer. The song is a defiant anthem of non-conformity, and it has been covered by various artists.

== History ==
Davies had written the song for the Animals, but it was turned down, so the Kinks released their own version with guitarist Dave Davies on lead vocals. This went against the norm where each brother usually sang songs they had written themselves. Later performances of the song were sung by Ray, with Dave providing backing vocals and Eric Clapton-influenced guitar solos. Both the Davies brothers continue to perform the song in their solo concerts.

Dave Davies described the song as "a Kinks fans favourite". He also said, "[I]t was never a hit for the Kinks, but over the years every true Kinks fan relates to that particular song, and it's funny, because that particular version is one of the only songs where Ray and I actually swap lead vocals. Elsewhere, when he sings lead I do the octave harmonies, or where I sing lead he's doing background vocals. Ray and I have very different ranges, fortunately, and our textures are different, which really helps for distinctive harmonies."

== Music and lyrics ==
The song is a defiant anthem of non-conformity, and its lyrics exhibit sentiments of frustration, accompanied by the outsider perception of being different from the rest, while yearning to seek and find, as well as assert, one's own individual identity. The song begins with an opening signature played somewhat menacingly on a twelve-string electric guitar in the key of A minor, punctuated by subtle drum beats, which then shifts into the key of G major when the lyrics begin, highlighting the song's angry stance.

I won't take all that they hand me down
And make out a smile though I wear a frown
And I'm not gonna take this all lying down
Cause once I get started I go to town
Cause I'm not like everybody else

Yet the mood also conveys a sense of sadness, and in the second verse expresses love and a sense of remorse, but with a cautious warning:

But darling, you know that I love you true
Do anything that you want me to
Confess all my sins like you want me to
There's one thing I will say to you
I'm not like everybody else

As the song progresses into its last bars, it builds up to a cathartic finale with intense playing from all of the members of the Kinks and then comes to a crashing close.

== Release and reception ==
The song was first released as the B-side to their single "Sunny Afternoon" but soon became a favourite and was often part of the Kinks live act. Ray Davies continues to play the song regularly and used the song as an opening number in his 2006–2008 solo live appearances. Cash Box said that it is a "rhythmic ode about a highly individual type of guy".

The song has been included on many compilations including Sunny Afternoon in the UK in 1967, The Great Lost Kinks Album in the US in 1973 and the 2002 greatest hits release The Ultimate Collection. It also appears as a bonus track on the 1998 CD reissue of Face to Face, the 2011 deluxe edition of The Kink Kontroversy, and the compilation The Anthology 1964–1971.

== Cover versions ==
Notable covers of the song include renditions by the Chocolate Watchband in 1968, by the Australian band Jimmy and the Boys as their debut single in 1979,by Chris Spedding on his 1980 album I'm Not Like Everybody Else and by the Damned on their covers album Not Like Everybody Else in 2026.

== Personnel ==
According to band researcher Doug Hinman:

- Dave Davies – lead vocal, electric guitar
- Ray Davies – backing vocal, electric guitar
- Pete Quaife – bass
- Mick Avory – drums

An organ part is audible on the recording, although no organist is credited in contemporary documentation.
