= Vampires (soundtrack) =

Vampires (Original Motion Picture Soundtrack)

Soundtrack album by John Carpenter
- Released: October 1998
- Studio: Cherokee Studios, Hollywood
- Genre: Blues rock; film score
- Length: 45:48
- Label: Milan Records
- Producer: The Robb Brothers

John Carpenter chronology
Escape from L.A. (1996)	Vampires (Original Motion Picture Soundtrack) (1998)	Ghosts of Mars (2001)

Professional ratings
Review scores
Source	Rating
Soundtrack.Net	4/5 stars

Vampires is a soundtrack album by John Carpenter for the 1998 film of the same name, released through Milan Records.

== Track listing ==
All music is composed by John Carpenter, except as noted.

No.	Title	Writer(s)	Artist(s)	Length
1.	"Teaser"	Brad Wilson	Stone	3:14
2.	"Slayers"		The Texas Toad Lickers	2:34
3.	"New Mexico"			2:21
4.	"Headless Priest"			2:48
5.	"Motel Sex"		The Texas Toad Lickers	4:27
6.	"Night Attack"			3:19
7.	"Santiago"			2:18
8.	"Stake and Burn"			3:42
9.	"Valek's Vision"			1:16
10.	"Surprise Death"			2:03
11.	"Valek Attacks"			3:32
12.	"Vampire Vision"			1:46
13.	"Farewell Slayer"			2:08
14.	"Cruel Highway"		The Texas Toad Lickers	2:58
15.	"Katrina Bites"			1:47
16.	"Padre's Wood"			5:35
Total length:				45:48

== Personnel ==
The Texas Toad Lickers

- John Carpenter - keyboards, piano, guitar, bass
- Steve Cropper - guitar
- Jeff Baxter - electric guitar, resonator guitar, pedal steel guitar
- Donald "Duck" Dunn - bass
- Rick Shlosser - drums
- Bruce Robb - Hammond B3 organ
- Joe Robb - saxophone

Stone

- Brad Wilson - vocals, guitar
- Brian James - bass
- J.J. Garcia - drums

Additional personnel

- Daniel Davies - guitar
- Cody Carpenter - keyboards
- E. "Bucket" Baker - drums, percussion
- Paul Mirkovich - orchestra conductor

== Reception ==
Carpenter's score won the award for "Best Music" at the 25th Saturn Awards. It was also nominated at the 1998 Bram Stoker Awards for "Best original motion picture sound track".
