= Batman: Mask of the Phantasm (soundtrack) =

Batman: Mask of the Phantasm (Original Motion Picture Soundtrack)

Film score by Shirley Walker
- Released: December 14, 1993
- Recorded: 1993
- Studio: Warner Bros.
- Genre: Superhero
- Length: 34:43
- Label: Reprise
- Producer: Ford A. Thaxton

Shirley Walker chronology
Memoirs of an Invisible Man (1992)	Batman: Mask of the Phantasm (Original Motion Picture Soundtrack) (1993)	Escape from L.A. (1996)

Batman: Mask of the Phantasm (Original Motion Picture Soundtrack) is the soundtrack to the 1993 animated superhero film. Featuring music composed by Shirley Walker, the main composer of Batman: The Animated Series (1992–1995), the film's soundtrack was released by Reprise Records on December 14, 1993. It features 11 tracks, including the original song "I Never Even Told You" written by Siedah Garrett and Glen Ballard and performed by Tia Carrere. A limited edition soundtrack released in over 3,000 copies by La-La Land Records on March 24, 2009. It contains the full score, as well as previously unreleased material from Walker's score being included in the album.

== Development ==
The original themes composed by Danny Elfman for Batman (1989) influenced Walker's score for the animated series as well as the film. In an interview with Cinemusic.com, Walker explained that the "latin" lyrics used in the main title theme were actually names of the music team read backwards. Since the music team had to complete the film before the final dubbing phase being completed. Since the orchestrators were not always given credit, Walker had to fight for getting the credits for the support team. She charted a number of syllables for each musicians name backwards to give the Latin lyrics, and also received contributions from key Warner Bros. staff members. She spent more time on writing the lyrics than the recording of the choral cues and by the time they recorded the choir, two of the staff members had deciphered the lyrics. She felt that the singers might feel difficult to sing the strange words, but had more fun on recording it. During the mixing of the score, Bobby Fernandez recorded the a cappella into a separate data logger for her sample reel, and by recording completed, each person had their own tape of singing of their names. Hans Zimmer, who would later compose the score for The Dark Knight Trilogy, played the synthesizer on the score, also doing the same for the animated series.

== Track listing ==
Batman: Mask of the Phantasm (Original Motion Picture Soundtrack)
No.	Title	Writer(s)	Performer	Length
1.	"Main Title"			1:35
2.	"The Promise"			0:46
3.	"Ski Mask Vigilante"			3:06
4.	"Phantasm's Graveyard Murder"			3:43
5.	"First Love"			1:35
6.	"The Big Chase"			5:32
7.	"A Plea for Help"			1:55
8.	"The Birth of Batman"			4:17
9.	"Phantasm and Joker Fight"			4:05
10.	"Batman's Destiny"			3:50
11.	"I Never Even Told You"	Siedah Garrett and Glen Ballard	Tia Carrere	4:20
Total length:				34:43

Batman: Mask of the Phantasm (Original Motion Picture Soundtrack) [Expanded Edition]
No.	Title	Writer(s)	Performer	Length
1.	"Main Title (Expanded)"			5:01
2.	"The Promise (Expanded)"			1:25
3.	"Ski Mask Vigilante (Expanded)"			4:28
4.	"Fancy Footwork"			0:40
5.	"Phantasm's Graveyard Murder"			3:52
6.	"Bad News / Set Trap / May They Rest In Peace"			1:51
7.	"First Love"			1:59
8.	"City Street Drive / Sal Velestra / Good Samaritan"			2:16
9.	"Birth of Batman (Expanded)"			6:01
10.	"The Joker's Big Entrance"			3:02
11.	"The Big Chase"			5:40
12.	"Nowhere to Run"			2:01
13.	"A Plea For Help"			1:01
14.	"A Tall Man / Arturo and his Pal / Makes You Want To Laugh / What's So Funny?"			4:04
15.	"Andrea Remembers / True Identity"			3:18
16.	"Phantasm and Joker Fight"			6:01
17.	"Batman's Destiny"			1:46
18.	"I Never Even Told You"	Siedah Garrett and Glen Ballard	Tia Carrere	4:23
19.	"Theme from Batman: Mask Of The Phantasm"			2:06
20.	"Welcome to the Future!"			1:01
Total length:				61:56

== Reception ==
The score received critical acclaim and has been cited one of Walker's best compositions, as well as her favorite score.

Writing for Comic Book Resources, Angelo Deros Trinos complimented it as a "uniquely Gothic and haunting music" and further wrote "Shirley Walker's melancholic music was inseparable from Batman: The Animated Series, and she upped the ante for Mask of the Phantasm. Walker's score emphasized Mask of the Phantasm's tragedy, and she turned it into an opera. Even The Batman's foreboding yet empowering music (composed by Michael Giacchino) falls short when put beside Walker's soundtrack." Kenneth Lowe of Paste wrote "Shirley Walker’s score arrives, for the first time, in a full statement with a choral element for good measure. It sets the tone for a story that ranks as some of the smallest stakes for any Batman movie (nobody’s poisoning Gotham’s water or assassinating its mayor), but seldom have the personal stakes for Batman and Bruce Wayne been as high."

Rodolfo Salas of Screen Rant had commented "The droning and pulsating opening score engulfed theaters like a thick tidal wave of molasses. Seeping from that molten drone were soul-piercing operatic voices. The notes escaping from their lips were the theme to Batman: The Animated Series. Having worked on Batman: The Animated Series, Walker understood the series' history and atmosphere through its music. Now she had more devices to convey that. Walker's musical score to the film welcomed audiences to familiar territory but with new bombastic volumes." Evan Krell of Mxdwn also commented "The music in Phantasm plays plenty of homage to Elfman’s original while also creating a sound that feels very unique".

Jason Wiese of CinemaBlend wrote "The music also expertly drives the thrilling action sequences, swells during flashbacks to Bruce Wayne’s romance with Andrea Beaumont (Dana Delany), and represents his torment when struggling to choose between love and vengeance (an essential highlight of the late Kevin Conroy’s performances in the role)." He considered it as "a key element to why Batman: Mask of the Phantasm is considered a masterpiece". Sean Wilson of Den of Geek had listed in his "25 greatest superhero scores of all time", and commented it as a "lavishly engrossing score for this classic nineties animation, a feast of dark-hued emotion that can easily stand ground with the likes of Danny Elfman’s pioneering work (his score for Batman (1989))". Charlie Brigden of Film School Rejects listed it as "one of the greatest film scores by a female composer" and commented "the score has a Bat-trunk full of highlights, from the mysterious Phantasm theme realized through a theremin to the early days of the dark knight’s crusade, culminating in the moment where Bruce puts on the cape and cowl, his transformation complete and Walker’s chorus screaming in contradictory triumph and sorrow."

== Personnel ==
- Composer – Shirley Walker
- Producer – Ford A. Thaxton
- Engineer – Nerida Tyson-Chew, Richard Bronskil
- Mixing – Robert Fernandez
- Mastering – James Nelson
- Editing – Thomas Milano, James Nelson
- Synthesizer – Hans Zimmer
- Auricle operator – Richard Grant
- Orchestration – Harvey R. Cohen, Ian Walker, Larry Rench, Lolita Ritmanis, Michael McCuistion, Peter Tomachek
- Contractor – Patti Zimmitti
- Music librarian – Joseph Maguire
- Copyist – Joel Franklin
- Liner notes – Randall Larson
- Executive in charge of music – Doug Frank, Gary LeMel
- Art direction – Mark Banning
