= Love Me Till the Sun Shines =

- Dutch B-side label

Single by Dave Davies

from the album Something Else by The Kinks
- A-side: "Death of a Clown"
- Released: 7 July 1967
- Studio: Pye, London
- Genre: Garage rock, blues rock
- Length: 3:23
- Label: Pye
- Songwriter: Dave Davies
- Producer: Ray Davies

Dave Davies singles chronology
"Death of a Clown" / "Love Me Till the Sun Shines" (1967)	"Susannah's Still Alive" (1968)

"Love Me Till the Sun Shines" is a 1967 song by the English rock band the Kinks. Appearing on their album Something Else by The Kinks, it was, unlike most of the band's songs, written by guitarist Dave Davies.

== Release ==
It was originally released as the B-side to Dave Davies' debut single, "Death of a Clown", in August 1967. The song made a further two appearances on vinyl, as an album track on the Kinks album Something Else by The Kinks, in September 1967, and as a track on the Dave Davies Hits EP released in April 1968. The latter record was a four track compilation of Davies' first two singles.

== Reception ==
"Love Me Till the Sun Shines" has generally received positive reception from critics.

Rolling Stone writer James Pomeroy said that "Dave is at his brutal and cynical best in 'Love Me Till the Sun Shines.'"

AllMusic critic Stewart Mason said:

One of three Dave Davies compositions on Something Else by the Kinks, 'Love Me Till the Sun Shines' isn't the tremendous creative leap forward that 'Death of a Clown' is, or evidence of a charming whimsicality on a par with his brother's like 'Funny Face,' but it's nonetheless impressive. Basically, it's the culmination of Davies' earlier attempts at songwriting, which were primarily in the blues format of repetitive lines balanced with a refrain that ends every verse. The difference this time is that the style doesn't feel forced and there's much less clichéd imagery in the lyrics; they may not be nearly as imaginative as the phantasmagorical 'Death of a Clown,' but at least they make sense and they get across the main point – which, again in keeping with Davies' earlier songs, is basically 'Hi, I'm really horny, how 'bout it?' – with a minimum of fuss. Although the production is unfortunately askew, with some handclaps on the later verses that are bizarrely over-prominent and a bassline that might as well not exist, the song rocks harder than anything else on the otherwise fairly placid album.

The song was recorded by the Kinks twice for BBC radio, in 1967 and 1968. The 1968 version is widely considered to be the definitive reading of the song, with a much more prominent bass line from Pete Quaife. It was a regular feature of the Kinks' live set from 1967 to 1969, and was later played solo by Dave Davies.

== Personnel ==
According to band researcher Doug Hinman:

The Kinks

- Dave Davies – lead vocal, electric guitar
- Ray Davies – acoustic guitar
- Pete Quaife – bass
- Mick Avory – drums, tambourine
- Unidentified (played by the Kinks) – handclaps

Additional musician

- Nicky Hopkins – organ
