= Bug (Dave Davies album) =

Studio album by Dave Davies
- Released: May 7, 2002
- Genre: Hard rock
- Length: 67:04
- Label: Koch Records
- Producer: Pete Magdaleno, Brian Myers

Dave Davies chronology
Fragile (2001)	Bug (2002)	Bugged... Live! (2002)

Professional ratings
Review scores
Source	Rating
AllMusic	3/5 stars

Bug is the fourth solo studio album by Dave Davies (best known as lead guitarist and co-founder of British rock band The Kinks), released in May 2002. It was released almost 20 years after the release of his third solo studio album Chosen People.

== Track listing ==
All tracks are written by Dave Davies.

No.	Title	Length
1.	"Who's Foolin' Who"	4:38
2.	"It Ain't Over, 'Till It's Done!"	4:00
3.	"The Lie!"	6:02
4.	"Let Me Be"	3:37
5.	"Displaced Person"	4:55
6.	"Rock You, Rock Me"	6:54
7.	"Flowers in the Rain"	3:38
8.	"Fortis Green"	5:46
9.	"Why?!!"	4:37
10.	"True Phenomenon"	4:56
11.	"Bug"	5:14
12.	"De-Bug"	3:59
13.	"Life After Life (Transformation)"	8:48

== Personnel ==
- Dave Davies – guitar, vocals
- Bryan Myers – percussion
- David Nolte – bass
- Kristian Hoffman – piano
- Jim Laspesa – bass, drums, vocals
