= Hold My Hand (Dave Davies song) =

- Dutch picture sleeve

Single by Dave Davies
- B-side: "Creeping Jean"
- Released: 17 January 1969
- Recorded: c. 20 December 1968
- Studio: Polydor, London
- Genre: Pop
- Length: 3:14
- Label: Pye
- Songwriter: Dave Davies
- Producer: Ray Davies

Dave Davies singles chronology
"Lincoln County" (1968)	"Hold My Hand" (1969)	"Imagination's Real" (1980)

"Hold My Hand" is a song and single recorded and written by Dave Davies. The song is Davies' fourth solo single.

== Recording ==
Like the previous three Dave Davies singles, "Hold My Hand" featured Dave Davies' band members from the Kinks providing the backing. It was recorded in 1968 (in and around the Kinks' critically acclaimed LP, The Kinks Are the Village Green Preservation Society). It was also one of the last tracks that featured the Kinks' longtime bassist, Pete Quaife.

== Release and reception ==
Dave Davies said in an interview prior to the song's release, "[I]f 'Hold My Hand' does click, I'll be free to do my own cabaret act if I want. I would use all new material, except maybe, a couple of the Kinks' hit records, but given a different treatment so that it suited a solo voice. Probably work with a small group. I'd love to have a go at this sort of act, but you know how things get talked about, then flop off." The single did indeed flop, receiving scant promotion from Pye and only modest airplay, not helped that the off-shore pirate radio stations had been taken off air by then.

After the disappointment of its predecessor, "Lincoln County", the Kinks management still thought a Dave Davies solo career was viable. Therefore "Hold My Hand" was released in 1969 as a standalone single, backed with "Creeping Jean" (which, although it wasn't released on any Kinks albums, has been a live favourite of Dave Davies' since he started performing solo in the late '90s). "Hold My Hand" did not chart in any country, even in European countries such as Germany and Holland where Kinks sales had historically held up. "Hold My Hand" would have likely appeared on any Dave Davies solo album had it appeared in the second half of the 1960s, but an album was never released. It however has since appeared on numerous compilations including The Album That Never Was and the reissues of Arthur (Or the Decline and Fall of the British Empire) from 1997 onwards. Most notably it appeared on 2011's Hidden Treasures in remastered stereo and demo form, this album finally brought the whole tortured saga of the lost 1960s Dave Davies solo album into full public gaze. Dave Davies put his solo career on hold, not releasing any new material non-related to the Kinks until 1980.

Writer Andy Miller named the "Hold My Hand" single "fabulous".

== Personnel ==
According to band researcher Doug Hinman:

- Dave Davies – lead vocal, electric guitar
- Ray Davies – piano
- Pete Quaife – bass
- Mick Avory – drums
