= Escape from L.A. (film score) =

Escape from L.A.: Original Score Album From the Motion Picture

Film score by John Carpenter & Shirley Walker
- Released: August 27, 1996
- Length: 33:32
- Label: Milan Records
- Producer: Shirley Walker

John Carpenter chronology
Village of the Damned (1995)	Escape from L.A. (1996)	Vampires (1998)

Shirley Walker chronology
Batman: Mask of the Phantasm (1993)	Escape from L.A. (1996)	Turbulence (1997)

Alternative cover
- 2014 expanded edition

Professional ratings
Review scores
Source	Rating
AllMusic	2/5 stars

Escape from L.A.: Original Score Album From the Motion Picture is the score by John Carpenter and Shirley Walker to the film of the same name. It was released on August 27, 1996 through Milan Records. A limited expanded edition was released in February, 2014 through La-La Land Records.

== Track listing ==
No.	Title	Writer(s)	Length
1.	"Escape from New York Main Title"	John Carpenter, Alan Howarth	2:07
2.	"History of Los Angeles"	Carpenter, Shirley Walker	2:09
3.	"Snake's Uniform"	Carpenter	0:58
4.	"Submarine Launch"	Walker	2:36
5.	"Sunset Boulevard Bazaar"	Walker	2:03
6.	"Motorcycle Chase"	Walker	2:23
7.	"Showdown"	Carpenter	1:27
8.	"Beverly Hills Surgeon General"	Carpenter, Walker	4:10
9.	"The Future Is Right Now"	Walker	2:00
10.	"Hang Glider Attack"	Walker	2:30
11.	"The Black Box"	Walker	1:14
12.	"Escape from Coliseum"	Walker	1:53
13.	"Helicopter Arrival"	Walker	2:05
14.	"Fire Fight"	Walker	2:49
15.	"Escape from Happy Kingdom"	Walker	1:30
16.	"Crash Landing"	Walker	1:38
Total length:			33:32

2014 expanded edition
No.	Title	Writer(s)	Length
1.	"Escape From New York - Main Title"	John Carpenter, Alan Howarth	2:09
2.	"History of Los Angeles"	Carpenter, Shirley Walker	3:14
3.	"Fire Base Seven"	Carpenter	1:04
4.	"Snake Arrives / Deportees"	Carpenter, Walker	1:18
5.	"Snake Gets Scratched"	Walker	1:36
6.	"Defense Lab"	Walker	2:42
7.	"Snake's Flashback"	Walker	1:21
8.	"Weapons / Snake's Uniform"	Walker / Carpenter	2:17
9.	"Snake's Escort"	Carpenter	1:28
10.	"Submarine Launch"	Walker	3:11
11.	"Sub Sinks"	Walker	0:45
12.	"Mulholland Drive-By"	Carpenter	1:11
13.	"Acid Rain / Tour Guide Sting / Snake Gets Directions"	Carpenter	1:30
14.	"Sunset Boulevard Bazaar"	Walker	2:04
15.	"Motorcycle Chase"	Walker	2:26
16.	"Showdown"	Carpenter	1:28
17.	"Push on Through / Snake Takes a Breather"	Walker / Carpenter	1:21
18.	"Beverly Hills Surgeon"	Carpenter, Walker	5:34
19.	"I Think We're Lost / Taslima"	Walker	2:23
20.	"The Future Is Right Now / Fun Gun"	Walker / Carpenter	3:58
21.	"The Black Box / Target L.A."	Walker	1:53
22.	"The Broadcast / The Coliseum"	Walker	3:16
23.	"Decapitation / Game time / The Game"	Walker	4:22
24.	"Escape from Coliseum"	Walker	1:55
25.	"Queen Mary / Hang Glider Attack"	Walker	3:35
26.	"Helicopter Arrival"	Walker	2:07
27.	"Texas Switch / Fire Fight"	Carpenter / Walker	3:50
28.	"Escape from Happy Kingdom"	Walker	1:32
29.	"Crash Landing"	Walker	1:40
30.	"Out of Time" (unused)	Carpenter	1:45
31.	"Presidential Decree"	Carpenter, Walker	7:14

Bonus track
No.	Title	Writer(s)	Length
32.	"J.C.'s Blues" (source)	Carpenter	3:05
Total length:			78:58

== Personnel ==
- John Carpenter – composition
- Shirley Walker – synthesizer, composition, arrangement, production
- Jamie Muhoberac – samples
- Nyle Steiner – electronic valve instrument
- Mike Watts – synthesizer
- Mike Fisher – electronic percussion
- Tommy Morgan – harmonicas
- Daniel Greco – hammer dulcimer
- John Goux – guitars
- Nathan East – bass
- John Robinson – rock drums
- Tom Raney – timpani soloist
- Greg Goodall – timpani soloist
- Robert Zimmitti – daiko drum soloist
- Endre Granat – violin soloist, concert master
- Jon Clarke – soprano oboe solo
- Lolita Ritmanis – orchestration
- Michael McCuistion – orchestration
- Robert Fernandez – recording, mixing
- Doug Botnick – recording
