= Assault on Precinct 13 (soundtrack) =

Film score by John Carpenter
- Released: 2003
- Recorded: 1976
- Genres: Electronic; film score; minimalist
- Length: 25:09
- Label: Record Makers

John Carpenter chronology
Ghosts of Mars (2001)	Assault on Precinct 13 (2003)	Lost Themes (2015)

Assault on Precinct 13 is a soundtrack by John Carpenter for the 1976 film of the same name, first released in 2003 through the French label Record Makers and reissued in 2013 by Death Waltz.

== Background ==
One of the film's distinctive features is its score, written in three days by John Carpenter and performed by Carpenter and Tommy Lee Wallace. The combination of synthesizer hooks, electronic drones and drum machines sets it apart from many other scores of the period and creates a distinct style of minimalist electronic soundtrack with which Carpenter, and his films, would become associated. The score consists of two main themes: the main title theme, with its familiar synthesizer melody, and a slower contemplative theme used in the film's more subdued scenes. Besides these two themes the soundtrack also features a series of ominous drones and primal drum patterns which often represent the anonymous gang gathering in the shadows. Carpenter, assisted by Dan Wyman, had several banks of synthesizers that would each have to be reset when another sound had to be created, taking a great deal of time. "When I did my original themes for [Assault] … it was done with very old technology," replied Carpenter. "It was very difficult to get the sounds, and it took very long to get something simple." Carpenter made roughly three to five separate pieces of music and edited them to the film as appropriate.

The main title theme, partially inspired by both Lalo Schifrin's score to Dirty Harry and Led Zeppelin's "Immigrant Song", is composed of a pop synthesizer riff with a drum machine underneath that "builds only in texture, but not thematically," according to David Burnand and Miguel Mera. A held, high synthesizer note, with no other changes except inner frequency modulations, becomes the musical motif of the gang members, and reoccurs during certain violent acts in the film. In the film, synthesizers and drum machines represent the city and the gang.

Carpenter also uses a plaintive electric piano theme when Lt. Bishop first enters the abandoned precinct. It reoccurs in the film during the quiet moments of the siege, becoming in effect a musical articulation of rhythm of the siege itself. Bishop is heard whistling the tune of this particular theme at the beginning and end of the film, making the electric piano theme "a non-diegetic realization of a diegetic source." Burnand and Mera have noted that "there is some attempt to show the common denominators of human behavior regardless of 'tribal' affiliations, and there is a clear attempt to represent this through simple musical devices."

== Critical reception ==
Professional ratings
Review scores
Source	Rating
AllMusic	4.5/5 stars

Many film critics who praised the film also praised the musical score by Carpenter. As John Kenneth Muir noted, "Carpenter wrote the riveting musical score for Assault... The final result was a unique, synthetic sound that is still quite catchy, even after 20 years … Delightfully, it even serves as a counterpoint in one important scene." Dave Goldner of SFX wrote that Assault had "one of the most catchy theme tunes in film history." In early 2004, Piers Martin of NME wrote that Carpenter's minimalist synthesizer score accounted for much of the film's tense and menacing atmosphere and its "impact, 27 years on, is still being felt."

== Legacy ==
A vocal version of the theme, titled "You Can't Fight It", with lyrics and production by Kenny Lynch, was recorded by Trinidad singer Jimmy Chambers and released in the UK as a 45 on the Pye label in April 1978, but it failed to chart and is now a rare item. Beyond its use in the film, the score is often cited as an influence on various electronic and hip hop artists with its main title theme being sampled by artists including Afrika Bambaataa, Tricky, Dead Prez and Bomb the Bass. The main theme was reworked in 1986 as an Italo disco 12" and more famously as the 1990 UK-charting rave-song "Hardcore Uproar".

Despite this influence, except for a few compilation appearances, the film's score remained available only in bootleg form until 2003 when it was given an official release on CD and LP in Europe through the Record Makers label.

In 2012, John Carpenter collaborator Alan Howarth released a newly recorded and slightly expanded version of the score (as well as the score for Carpenter's first film, Dark Star) using modern digital software. Released on BuySoundtrax Records, it was the first time the music had been released in stereo form.

In 2013, the original score was reissued again on CD, LP and cassette in the United Kingdom by the Death Waltz Recording Company. The vinyl LP was pressed on 180-gram vinyl, came house inside a gatefold jacket including eight pages of liner notes and was released with three colored vinyl variations: "Vanilla Twist Edition," limited to 1,000 copies and only available through the Death Waltz online store; brown and white swirl, limited to 300 copies and only available through the Death Waltz subscription service; and vanilla.

== Track listing ==
All music is composed by John Carpenter.

No.	Title	Length
1.	"Assault On Precinct 13 (Main Title)"	3:33
2.	"Napoleon Wilson"	0:53
3.	"Street Thunder"	1:26
4.	"Precinct 9 - Division 13"	1:05
5.	"Targets / Ice Cream Man On Edge"	3:08
6.	"Wrong Flavour"	2:05
7.	"Emergency Stop"	0:59
8.	"Lawson's Revenge"	1:01
9.	"Sanctuary"	1:05
10.	"Second Wave"	0:28
11.	"The Windows!"	2:03
12.	"Julie"	1:54
13.	"Well's Flight"	1:41
14.	"To The Basement"	1:08
15.	"Walking Out"	0:37
16.	"Assault On Precinct 13"	2:03
Total length:		25:09
