= Death of a Clown =

- Danish picture sleeve

Single by Dave Davies

from the album Something Else by the Kinks
- B-side: "Love Me Till the Sun Shines"
- Released: 7 July 1967
- Recorded: c. 5 June 1967
- Genre: Chamber pop
- Length: 3:15
- Label: Pye
- Songwriters: Dave Davies; Ray Davies
- Producer: Shel Talmy

Dave Davies singles chronology
"Death of a Clown" (1967)	"Susannah's Still Alive" (1967)

"Death of a Clown" is a song by Dave Davies, lead guitarist of British rock band the Kinks, which was released as his debut solo single in 1967. The song was co-written with his brother Ray Davies, who contributed the 5-bar "La la la" hook; Ray's first wife, Rasa, sings this phrase as well as descant in the second verse, while Ray himself sings harmony in the refrain. Nicky Hopkins played the distinctive introduction, using fingerpicks on the strings of a piano. The single was credited to Dave Davies but the song, which features all the members of the Kinks, also appeared on the band's album Something Else by the Kinks, released later in 1967.

== Background ==
In an interview with Yahoo!, Dave Davies said that "Death of a Clown" was written about the repetitive performing schedule he and the rest of the Kinks worked through. He said, "One night I nodded off at a party and woke up and saw all these decadent people running around. I had a vision of being a circus clown. I thought, 'What are we doing?' We were going from day to day to day like performing seals. And that's where I got the idea for 'Death of a Clown.' I went back to me mum's house with the same old out-of-tune piano and I plunked out three notes, and it turned into the song."

The single release was met with considerable success in the UK, hitting No. 3, thus prompting Dave Davies to consider embarking on a solo career. When subsequent singles were met with less success, the idea was set aside until 1980, with his debut album being AFL1-3603.

== Personnel ==
According to band researcher Doug Hinman:

The Kinks

- Dave Davies – lead vocal, electric guitar
- Ray Davies – acoustic guitar, backing vocal
- Pete Quaife – bass
- Mick Avory – drums

Additional musicians

- Rasa Davies – backing vocal
- Nicky Hopkins – piano

== Charts ==
Chart (1967)	Peak position
Australia (Go-Set)	37
Belgium (Ultratop 50 Flanders)	5
Belgium (Ultratop 50 Wallonia)	16
Ireland (IRMA)	6
Netherlands (Dutch Top 40)	2
New Zealand (Listener Chart)	10
Norway (VG-lista)	7
UK Singles (OCC)	3
West Germany (GfK)	3
