= Something Else by the Kinks =

Studio album by the Kinks
- Released: 15 September 1967
- Recorded: January–July 1967; (except April and 9 June 1966 for "End of the Season")
- Studios: Pye, London
- Genres: Baroque pop; art pop; rock; psychedelia; folk; music hall
- Length: 36:17
- Labels: Pye, Reprise (U.S.)
- Producers: Shel Talmy (US); uncredited (UK)

The Kinks UK chronology
Face to Face (1966)	Something Else by the Kinks (1967)	Sunny Afternoon (1967)

The Kinks US chronology
The Live Kinks (1967)	Something Else by the Kinks (1968)	The Kinks Are the Village Green Preservation Society (1969)

Singles from Something Else by the Kinks
- 1. "Waterloo Sunset" Released: 5 May 1967; 2. "Death of a Clown" / "Love Me Till the Sun Shines" Released: 7 July 1967

Something Else by the Kinks, often referred to simply as Something Else, is the fifth studio album by the English rock band the Kinks, released on 15 September 1967 by Pye Records. The album continued the Kinks' trend toward an eccentric baroque pop and music hall-influenced style defined by frontman Ray Davies' observational and introspective lyrics. It also marked the final involvement of American producer Shel Talmy in the Kinks' 1960s studio recordings; henceforth Ray Davies would produce the group's recordings. Many of the songs feature the keyboard work of Nicky Hopkins and the backing vocals of Davies's wife, Rasa. The album was preceded by the singles "Waterloo Sunset", one of the group's most acclaimed songs, and the Dave Davies solo record "Death of a Clown", both of which charted in the UK top 3.

Though it contained two major European hits and earned positive notices from the music press in both the UK and US, Something Else sold poorly and became the Kinks' lowest-charting album in both countries at the time. As with the group's other albums from the period, however, it found retrospective praise and became a cult favourite. The album was ranked No. 288 on Rolling Stone magazine's 2003 list of the "500 Greatest Albums of All Time". It was voted number 237 in Colin Larkin's All Time Top 1000 Albums 3rd Edition (2000).

== Recording ==
Ray Davies assumed control over production after the departure of Shel Talmy; hence Something Else marked a change in the sound and production style of the Kinks. Davies felt unsure of his skill in mixing and recording the group's records, and later commented: "I feel that I shouldn't have been allowed to produce Something Else. What went into an album required someone whose approach was a little bit more mundane".

Apart from "End of the Season" (done in April 1966), the album was recorded between the autumn of 1966 and the summer of 1967, when the Kinks had cut back on touring and had begun recording and stockpiling songs for Davies's as-yet poorly defined "village green" project. The song "Village Green" was recorded in November 1966 during the sessions for the album, but was released on a French EP in 1967 and did not appear on a Kinks LP until the next release, The Kinks Are the Village Green Preservation Society.

== Composition ==
Musically, Something Else features multiple different genres and stylistic influences, from the chamber pop of "Death of a Clown" to the bossa nova of "No Return". With the exception of the garage rock-style "Love Me Till the Sun Shines" the album was a departure from the hard-edged rock and roll of the group's earlier material, instead featuring mellower, acoustic baroque pop ballads, English music hall, and "tempered" R&B.

Ray Davies's lyrics on the album deal with English-inspired subject matter, particularly the harpsichord-laden "Two Sisters", the lazy shuffle "End of the Season", and the sardonic "David Watts".

The album includes three songs composed by Dave Davies, including the hit single "Death of a Clown".

== Reception ==
Professional ratings
Review scores
Source	Rating
AllMusic	5/5 stars
Pitchfork	9.3/10
Rolling Stone	(positive)
Encyclopedia of Popular Music	5/5 stars
Uncut	4/5 stars

The album sold poorly in the UK, in part because it competed with budget-priced compilation albums of early Kinks hits from 1964 to 1966; also, Pye Records had released "Waterloo Sunset", "Death of a Clown" and other songs before the album appeared. Something Else also sold poorly in the US upon release there in January 1968, where the group was still the subject of a US ban on live and television performances.

James Pomeroy, in a March 1968 review in Rolling Stone, felt it was the best album the Kinks had made to that point, praising the "humor, cynicism, perception and irony" where he felt the band are at their best. He picked out "David Watts" and "Waterloo Sunset" as the best tracks, and also praised the three contributions of Dave Davies.

In a retrospective review for AllMusic, Stephen Thomas Erlewine felt that the work was characterised by "nostalgic and sentimental" songwriting, and that part of "the album's power lies in its calm music, since it provides an elegant support for Davies' character portraits and vignettes".

In 2003, Something Else was ranked No. 288 on Rolling Stone's list of the 500 greatest albums of all time, No. 289 in a 2012 revised list, and later at No. 478 in the 2020 revised list.

== Track listing ==
All tracks are written by Ray Davies, except where noted. Track lengths per AllMusic.

Side one

1. "David Watts" – 2:40
2. "Death of a Clown" (R. Davies, Dave Davies) – 3:15
3. "Two Sisters" – 2:03
4. "No Return" – 2:03
5. "Harry Rag" – 2:19
6. "Tin Soldier Man" – 2:53
7. "Situation Vacant" – 2:43

Side two

1. "Love Me Till the Sun Shines" (D. Davies) – 3:23
2. "Lazy Old Sun" – 2:49
3. "Afternoon Tea" – 3:25
4. "Funny Face" (D. Davies) – 2:29
5. "End of the Season" – 3:00
6. "Waterloo Sunset" – 3:16

== Personnel ==
According to the band researcher Doug Hinman, except where noted:

The Kinks

- Ray Davies – lead vocals, electric and acoustic guitars, keyboards; Mellotron ("Lazy Old Sun"); (Note: When detailing the song's recording session, Hinman writes "Funny Face" features Mellotron. When listing the song's personnel, he instead writes Davies or Hopkins played either piano or organ.) producer (uncredited)
- Dave Davies – backing vocals, electric guitars; lead vocals ("Death of a Clown", "Love Me Till the Sun Shines" and "Funny Face")
- Pete Quaife – backing vocals, bass guitar
- Mick Avory – drums; tambourine ("Love Me Till the Sun Shines")
- Unidentified (played by the Kinks) – handclaps ("Love Me Till the Sun Shines")

Additional musicians

- The Mike Cotton Sound – flute, saxophone and trumpet ("Tin Soldier Man")
- Rasa Davies – backing vocals
- Nicky Hopkins – piano; harpsichord ("Two Sisters"); organ ("Love Me Till the Sun Shines")
- David Whitaker – string arrangement ("Two Sisters")
- Unnamed session musicians – cello and viola ("Two Sisters")

Additional production

- Shel Talmy – producer (uncredited on UK edition)
- Alan MacKenzie – engineer
- Alan O'Duffy (credited as "Irish") – assistant engineer

Note

- The UK edition of the LP does not list a producer while the US edition credits Shel Talmy Productions. In April 1967, after most of the album had been recorded, Davies became unsatisfied with Talmy's production. The relationship between the two dissolved, leaving Davies to produce the rest of the album alone. Dispute remains over who produced which tracks, though Hinman concludes the LP is "a mixture of Ray Davies-produced and Shel Talmy-produced recordings".

== Charts ==
Weekly chart performance for Something Else by the Kinks
Chart (1967–68)	Peak position
Norwegian Albums (VG-lista)	12
UK Record Retailer LPs Chart	35
US Billboard Top LPs	153
US Cash Box Top 100 Albums	89
West German Musikmarkt LP Hit Parade	31
