= AFL1-3603 =

Studio album by Dave Davies
- Released: 26 September 1980
- Recorded: September – November 1979
- Studio: Konk Studios, London, England
- Genre: Hard rock; power pop
- Length: 38:44
- Label: RCA
- Producer: Dave Davies

Dave Davies chronology
AFL1-3603 (1980)	Glamour (1981)

Professional ratings
Review scores
Source	Rating
Allmusic	3/5 stars

AFL1-3603 (aka Dave Davies) is an album released in 1980 by Dave Davies featuring Davies performing all the instruments. The album (named after its own serial number) peaked at number 42 on the Billboard 200.

The album was favorably reviewed on Allmusic. James Chrispell wrote that "Dave Davies came out swinging with the great AFL1-3603" which "holds lots of power pop treasures, such as the very lovely 'Imaginations Real' and the nice change of pace 'Visionary Dreamer'."

== Track listing ==
All tracks are written by Dave Davies.

No.	Title	Length
1.	"Where Do You Come From"	3:42
2.	"Doing the Best for You"	4:45
3.	"Visionary Dreamer"	4:28
4.	"Nothin' More to Lose"	4:09
5.	"The World Is Changing Hands"	2:55
6.	"Move Over"	3:45
7.	"See the Beast"	3:55
8.	"Imaginations Real"	3:53
9.	"In You I Believe"	3:17
10.	"Run"	3:55

== Personnel ==
- Dave Davies - vocals, keyboards, guitar; bass guitar and drums on tracks 2–5, 8, 9
- Ron Lawrence - bass guitar on tracks 1, 6, 7, 10
- Nick Trevisick - drums on tracks 1, 6, 7, 10

Technical

- Ben Fenner, John Rollo - engineer
- J.J. Stelmach - art direction, design
- Nick Sangiamo - photography
