= Dave Davies =

English guitarist (born 1947)

- Davies in 1971

Background information
- Born: David Russell Gordon Davies; 3 February 1947 (age 79); Fortis Green, London, England
- Origin: Muswell Hill, London, England
- Genres: Rock; pop; hard rock
- Occupations: Guitarist; singer; songwriter
- Instruments: Guitar; vocals
- Years active: 1963–present
- Labels: Angel Air; Koch
- Website: davedavies.com

David Russell Gordon Davies (/ˈdeɪviːz/ DAY-veez; (Note: Dave's brother Ray pronounces the surname differently: /ˈdeɪvɪz/ DAY-viz.) born 3 February 1947) is an English guitarist, singer and songwriter. He was the lead guitarist and backing vocalist for the English rock band the Kinks, led by his elder brother (and principal writer and singer) Ray, and the two of them were the only consistent members during the band's existence. Davies also sometimes undertook writing and/or lead vocals duties within the band, for example on the songs "Death of a Clown", "Party Line", "Strangers" and "Rats". He has also embarked on a solo career, releasing several singles during the late 1960s and has since released eight solo albums.

Davies is known for innovative electric guitar technique, specifically in being one of the first to use electric guitar distortion and exposing the effect to the mainstream. His signature distorted power chord riffs on songs would heavily influence future heavy metal and punk rock acts. He was inducted into the Rock and Roll Hall of Fame in 1990 as a member of the Kinks and, in 2003, was ranked 91st in Rolling Stone's list of the "100 Greatest Guitarists of All Time".

== Early life ==
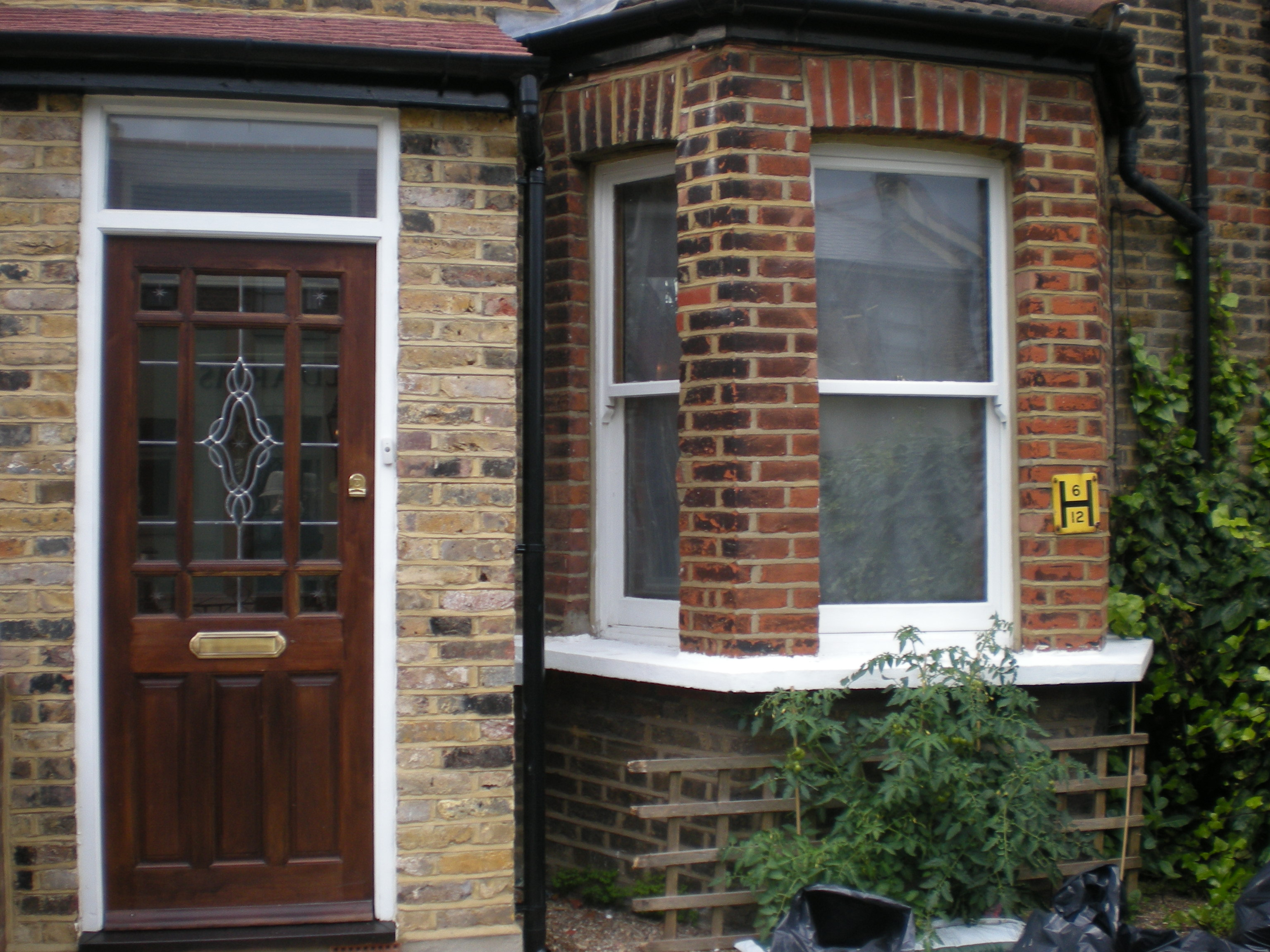
6 Denmark Terrace, birthplace of Dave Davies

David Russell Gordon Davies was born at 6 Denmark Terrace, Muswell Hill, North London. He was born the last of eight children, including six older sisters and an elder brother, later bandmate Ray. Both brothers attended the William Grimshaw Secondary Modern. As children, the Davies brothers were immersed in a world of different musical styles, from the music hall of their parents' generation, to the jazz and early rock n' roll that their older sisters listened to. The siblings developed a rivalry early on, with both brothers competing for their parents' and sisters' attention.

Davies grew up playing skiffle, but soon bought an electric guitar and started experimenting with rock. The Davies brothers and friend Pete Quaife jammed together in the front room of their house. Activities in the Davies household centred around this front room, culminating in large parties, where the parents would sing and play piano together. The front room and these parties were musically nurturing to the Davies brothers, later influencing the Kinks' interpretations of the traditional British music hall style. Dave and his brother worked out the famous two-chord riff of their 1964 hit "You Really Got Me" on the piano in the front room.

== Career ==
Davies founded the Kinks with Pete Quaife in 1963. His brother Ray, who became the best-known member and de facto leader of the band, joined soon after. The quartet was formed when drummer Mick Avory joined. Dave Davies had a turbulent relationship with Avory, one of the reasons behind the latter's departure from the band in the mid-1980s, although the two had been housemates together in the mid-1960s.

Ray and Dave Davies remained the only two steady members of the band. They were accompanied by an oft-changing roster of bassists and keyboardists. Dave played a largely subordinate role to his brother, often staying behind the scenes. Dave would make occasional contributions on Kinks records as lead vocalist and songwriter, with classics such as "Party Line" (the lyrics were written by Ray and the song has been attributed to Ray on many editions of "Face to Face"), "Death of a Clown" and "Strangers".

=== Early years (1963–1966) ===
The Kinks were signed to Pye Records in late 1963, and Dave Davies turned 17 three days before the first Kinks single (a version of "Long Tall Sally") was issued in early 1964. Davies was solely responsible for the signature distorted power chord sound on the Kinks' first hit, "You Really Got Me". He achieved the sound by using a razor blade to slit the speaker cone on his Elpico amplifier, which he then ran through a larger Vox as a "pre-amp". This sound was one of the first mainstream appearances of distortion, which was to have a major influence on many later musicians, especially in heavy metal and punk rock.

"You Really Got Me" was the band's third released single, the two previous recordings having failed to chart. They had a three-single contract with Pye Records, and needed a hit to get another. Pye didn't like the song and refused to pay for studio time. The band arranged other financial support to cut the single, which became a hit, topping the charts in the UK and reaching number 7 in the US.

The Kinks released three albums and several EPs in the next two years. They also performed and toured relentlessly, headlining package tours with the likes of The Yardbirds and The Mickey Finn, which caused tension within the band. Some legendary on-stage fights erupted during this time as well. The most notorious incident was at the Capitol Theatre in Cardiff in May 1965, involving drummer Mick Avory and Dave Davies. The fight broke out during the second number of the set, "Beautiful Delilah". It culminated with Davies insulting Avory and kicking over his drum set after finishing the first song, "You Really Got Me". Avory responded by knocking down Davies with his hi-hat stand, rendering him unconscious. He then fled from the scene and Davies was taken to Cardiff Royal Infirmary, where he received 16 stitches to the head. Avory later claimed that it was part of a new act in which the band members would hurl their instruments at each other.

During the late 1960s the group steadily evolved, as Ray's songwriting skills developed and he began to lead the group in a new direction. The group abandoned the traditional R&B/blues sound and adopted a more nostalgic, reflective style of music, as showcased on songs like "Autumn Almanac" and "Waterloo Sunset", as well as their albums, such as Something Else by the Kinks and The Kinks Are the Village Green Preservation Society.

=== Late 1960s and solo career ===
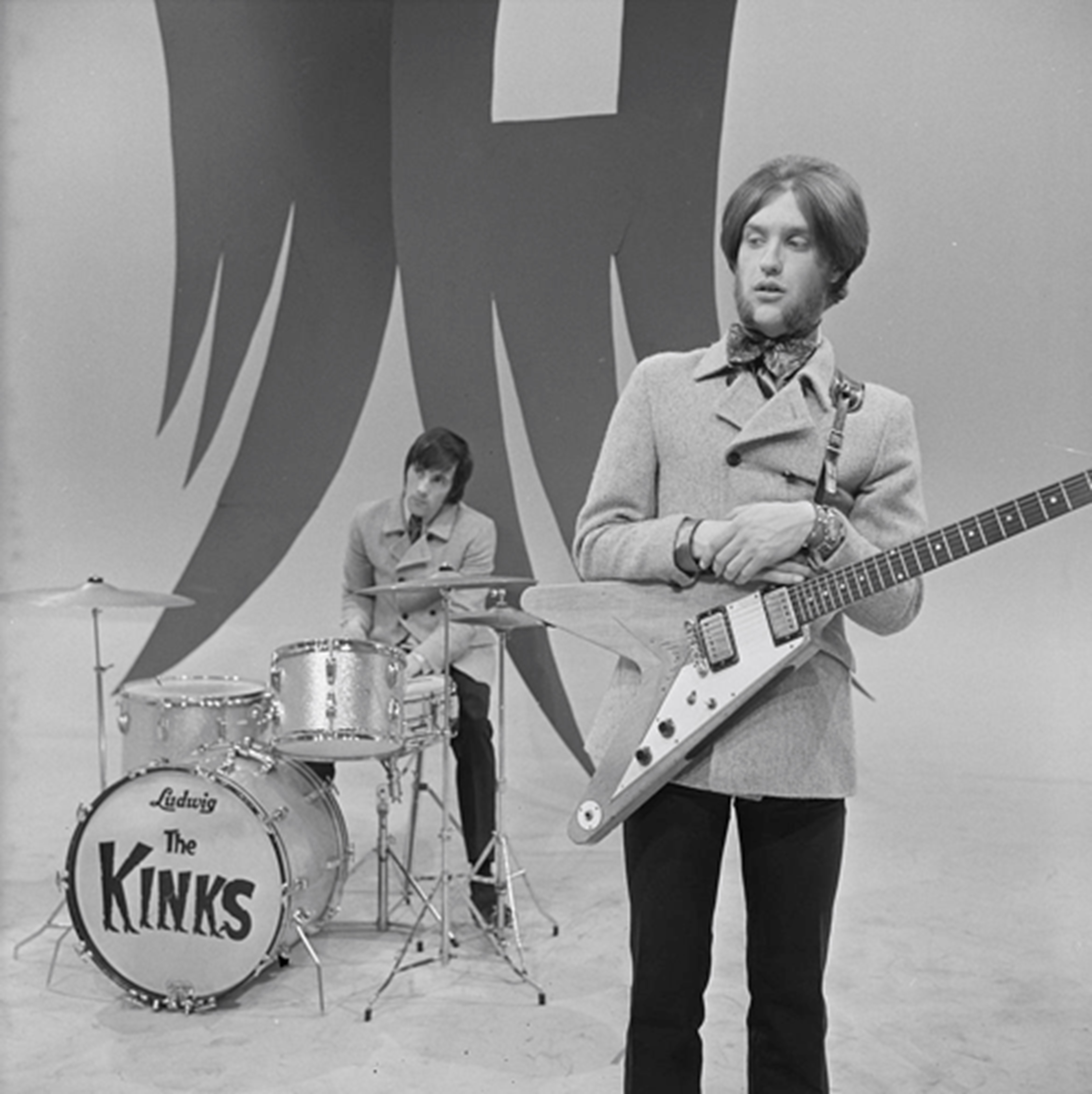
Dave Davies & Mick Avory (Dutch TV, 1967)

In July 1967, Dave Davies released his first solo single, "Death of a Clown", credited entirely under his name as the recording artist, though it was co-written by his brother. Previously, as a member of the Kinks, Dave Davies had only released his own compositions on B-sides and albums. Pye Records, the Kinks' label, sensed potential sales in a solo release from the overlooked Davies and issued "Death of a Clown" as his debut. Although the single was credited to Davies, the backing band was the Kinks, and the track also appeared on Something Else by the Kinks.

"Death of a Clown" rose to number three on the UK Singles Chart. Wanting to profit from the new buzz suddenly surrounding Davies, a solo LP was slated for release sometime in 1968 or 1969. The follow-up single, "Susannah's Still Alive", was released in November 1967; however, it only reached number 20 on the Melody Maker chart. The release of the solo album was held back, and it was decided to wait and see how another single would fare. As anticipation grew for the release of the new LP, it was nicknamed A Hole in the Sock Of. "Lincoln County" was chosen as the next single, but it failed to chart. By the time a fourth single, "Hold My Hand", met with the same result, a combination of his own lack of interest in continuing and Pye's decision to stop killed off any hopes of an album.

Eventually, the tracks intended for his first solo album were assembled for a 2011 compilation by Russell Smith & Andrew Sandoval entitled Hidden Treasures. It combined the singles, B-sides that were released for various Kinks singles and a handful of album tracks that Davies had recorded for Kinks albums. Many of these tracks had been assembled previously for The Album That Never Was, released in 1987.

The Kinks Are the Village Green Preservation Society and Arthur were released in 1968 and 1969, respectively. Although they received unanimous acclaim, Village Green failed to chart internationally, and Arthur was met with a mediocre commercial reception. These records, although praised by critics and the rock press, were commercial failures.

=== "Lola", Muswell Hillbillies, and theatrical incarnation ===
Promotional photo of Davies in 1971

After Arthur, the Kinks made a comeback with their hit single "Lola" and the accompanying concept album Lola versus Powerman and the Moneygoround, Part One in 1970. Dave recorded two songs of his own for this LP, the acoustic "Strangers" and the hard-rocking "Rats". The rootsy Muswell Hillbillies, themed on country-rock and Americana, was released in late 1971 and was well-received with critics, but failed to sell strongly. The band's next five albums, Everybody's in Show-Biz, Preservation: Act 1, Preservation: Act 2, The Kinks Present A Soap Opera and Schoolboys in Disgrace, which added a large theatrical ensemble, were critical and commercial failures.

The Kinks left RCA Records in 1977, switching to Arista. The group shed all of the extra backing vocalists and brass instrumentalists that had accompanied them throughout their theatrical years, and reverted to a five-piece rock group again. Their debut LP for Arista was entitled Sleepwalker, and was a commercial and critical comeback for the group. It was the first album in what critics usually call the "arena rock" phase of the group, in which more commercial and mainstream production techniques would be employed. Dave later commented that he was glad to be back to more guitar-oriented songs, and he has listed Sleepwalker as one of his favourites.

=== 1980s and onward ===
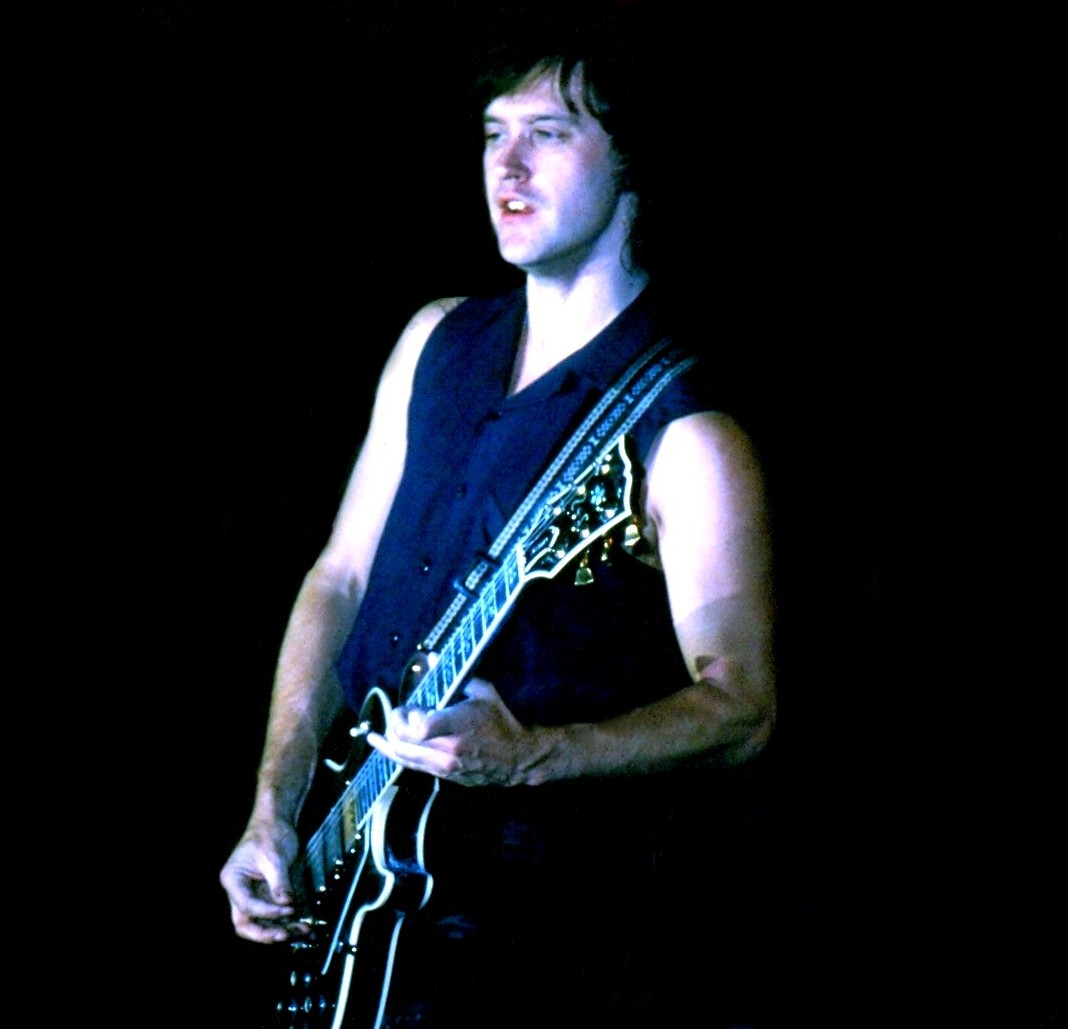
Davies performing in 1979

Davies saw the band through both success and failure, as they reached their commercial peak in the early 1980s. The group began adjusting their commercial methods, embracing the MTV culture that was selling records at the time. The music video for their 1982/83 single "Come Dancing" helped hoist the record to number 12 on the UK chart, and number 6 in the US – their biggest hit since "Tired of Waiting for You" in 1965.

The Kinks' popularity faltered in 1985, and soon their records ceased to chart altogether. Mick Avory left the band after the Kinks' last album for Arista, Word of Mouth, mainly due to the growing animosity between him and Dave Davies. Bob Henrit was brought in to take Avory's place. At the invitation of Ray Davies, Avory agreed to manage Konk Studios, where he also served as a producer and occasional contributor on later Kinks albums.

The group switched to MCA (US) and London (UK) records in late 1985, and began work on their next album, Think Visual. The record was released in 1986, but only reached number 81 on the Billboard charts. Critics were lukewarm towards it, and it did not receive significant radio play. Stephen Thomas Erlewine of Allmusic.com later commented that the album "represented an artistic dead end for the Kinks, as Ray Davies continued to crank out a series of competent, but undistinguished hard rockers." Dave Davies contributed two songs to Think Visual, "Rock 'n' Roll Cities" and "When You were a Child".

The group recorded several more records for MCA, their last studio effort for them being 1989's UK Jive. It was received slightly better than Think Visual, but it failed to enter into the Top 100. Dave Davies contributed the song "Dear Margaret" to the vinyl record – the cassette and CD of the album also contained two further Dave Davies songs, "Bright Lights" and "Perfect Strangers".

The group left MCA and struggled to find a record label that would accept them. All four original members were inducted into the Rock and Roll Hall of Fame in 1990, but this failed to revive their career. Eventually the Kinks signed to Columbia Records, who released their final studio album together, Phobia, on 13 April 1993. Despite publicity and press attention, the record was unsuccessful, peaking at number 166. Singles released failed to chart as well. To Phobia Davies contributed the songs "It's Alright (Don't Think About It)" and "Close to the Wire".

Columbia dropped the group in 1994, forcing them to retreat to their old Konk Records. The group released To The Bone on the small independent Grapevine Records in 1994.

The Kinks took a break from recording and touring in 1996. Ray and Dave reunited onstage to perform "You Really Got Me" at the Islington Assembly Hall in London on 18 December 2015. Rolling Stone magazine called their performance "rousing".

In 2026, Ray and Dave teamed up with English painter Christian Furr, for The Brothers exhibition held at the Gibson Garage in London, from the 24 July. Furr reimagined the 1968 "magic moment" when the brothers crammed into an East Finchley photo booth, for their iconic makeshift photo shoot.

==== Solo work, 1980s–present day ====
After the aborted solo effort, Davies's solo career was not revived until 1980, with the release of Dave Davies (AFL1-3603), which featured Davies performing all the instruments himself. The album, named after its own catalog number, peaked at number 42 on the Billboard 200. He went on to release Glamour (1981), which charted at number 152. Davies brought in a back-up band to play with him on this record. Chosen People was released in 1983, but failed to crack the Billboard 200.

Davies released his first true solo studio album in twenty years, Bug, in 2002. Fractured Mindz followed in January 2007. It was also his first new studio effort since his stroke in the summer of 2004 besides the track "God in my Brain" (which was recorded and released on the compilation album Kinked in January 2006).

Two Worlds was recorded throughout 2010 by The Aschere Project, the production team of Dave Davies and his son Russ. Both members wrote, produced, and recorded all the tracks. About the album's genre, Dave stated "it's a mixture of rock, kinda classical and electronic music." In February 2010, Davies released an autobiographical DVD filmed by his other son, titled Mystical Journey. His planned US tour in support of the release was postponed per doctor's advice. It was announced in February 2013 that on 4 June 2013, Davies would be releasing his sixth studio album entitled I Will Be Me worldwide. Davies undertook a short tour of the US to promote the album. Davies performed his first UK show in thirteen years in February 2014. In October 2014, to celebrate the 50th Anniversary of the Kinks, a new album by Davies, with many tracks looking back to the start of the band, titled Rippin' Up Time was released. Davies appeared on The Tonight Show Starring Jimmy Fallon to promote the album in 2014. This episode was the highest rated Tonight Show episode in 2014.

In 2015, the Dave Davies solo album Rippin Up New York City was released on Red River Entertainment. He embarked on a solo tour to promote the album in the US in October and November. On 18 December, at his concert at the Islington Assembly Hall in London, he was joined onstage by Ray to perform the Kinks' hit "You Really Got Me" together. This marked the first time in nearly 20 years that the brothers had appeared and performed together. Speaking about his 2004 stroke to Evan Davis on the PM (BBC Radio 4) 23 July 2026, broadcast, Dave shared that the episode had brought the "brothers closer together" and are able to spend personal time together.

== Signature instruments ==
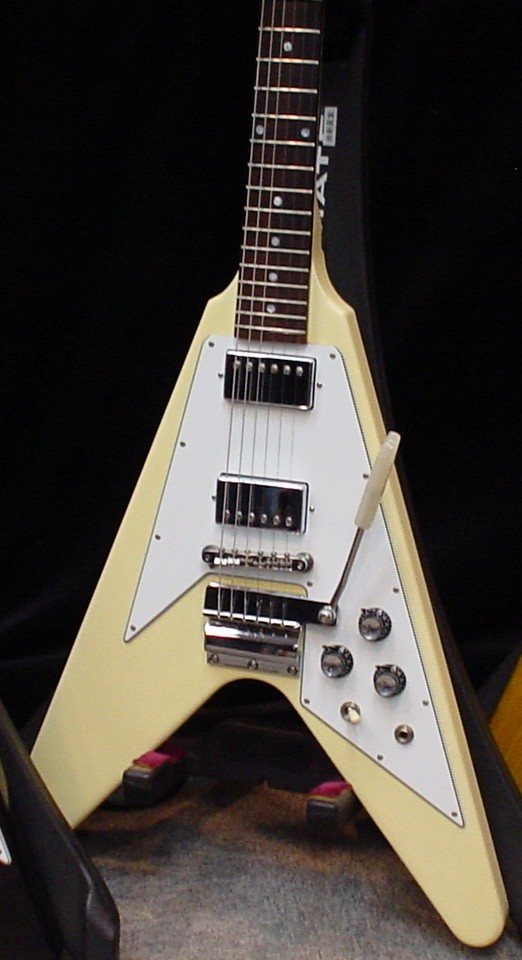
A Gibson Flying V

Davies has played a number of guitars over time, the most recognizable of which is his Gibson Flying V. Davies bought it in 1965, and soon began appearing live and on TV performances with it. Davies was one of the few guitarists who played Flying Vs at the time. It was, in that period, out of issue due to lack of interest upon its 1958 test release, and models were numbered. Guitarists such as Lonnie Mack, Jimi Hendrix, Albert King and Davies himself helped stir interest in the instrument, and it would eventually become one of the signature guitars of the heavy metal era.

Davies commented on his Flying V:

I used to play a Guild custom built guitar and the airline lost it on our first American tour in '64 or '65. ... I had to get a replacement quick. I went into a store and they didn't have anything I liked. I saw this dusty old guitar case and I said "What have you got in there?" he said "Oh, that's just some silly old guitar." He got it out and I bought it for about $60.

Davies has played many other guitars throughout his career. He has played several models of Gibson Les Pauls over time, including a "Goldtop" model with P90 pickups and a black '78 model. On his website he lists the following:

- Gibson Les Paul – Standard, Custom, Deluxe, Artisan and Goldtop models
- Fender Elite Telecaster
- Fender American Standard Telecaster
- '63 Fender Telecaster sunburst (owned by Ray, used as Dave's main guitar between 1967 and 1969)
- '54 Fender Stratocaster
- Gibson Flying V
- Gibson L5-S
- Gibson L6-S
- Guild F-512 NT 12-string acoustic
- Harmony Meteor

== Personal life and health ==
Davies was expelled from school at the age of 15 after being caught having sex with his girlfriend, Sue Sheehan, on Hampstead Heath. Shortly thereafter, they were forced to separate by their respective families after Sheehan found out she was pregnant. Their relationship had a profound impact on Davies, who wrote a number of songs about their separation including "Funny Face", "Susannah's Still Alive", and "Mindless Child of Motherhood". In 1967, Davies married Lisbet (a cousin of Pete Quaife's first wife, Annette) and they divorced in 1990. From that marriage, Davies has four children. Three other children, including Daniel, are from a relationship with Nancy Evans. Davies briefly reunited with Sue Sheehan in the late 1990s.

Davies published an autobiography, entitled Kink in 1996, in which he discussed his bisexuality and brief relationships with Long John Baldry and music producer Michael Aldred in the late 1960s. He also wrote of the tense professional relationship with his brother over the Kinks' career.

Davies has been vegetarian since the late 1960s, and has said that he does not think meat is good for the nervous system.

On 30 June 2004, Davies suffered a stroke while exiting a lift at Broadcasting House, where he had been promoting his album Bug. He was taken to University College Hospital. Davies was released from the hospital on 27 August. By 2006, Davies had recovered enough to be able to walk, talk and play the guitar.

In September 2013 Rolling Stone magazine wrote about Davies and his girlfriend Rebecca G. Wilson. She contributed backing vocals to the songs "Front Room" and "King of Karaoke". Since 2014, Wilson has gone on tour as Davies's backup singer.

A second autobiography, Living on a Thin Line (ISBN 9781472289773), was released in July 2022. The book's name is taken from "Living on a Thin Line", a Kinks track released in 1984. Davies details in the book how in 1982, while on tour in the US, he started hearing voices. He says that those voices were alien in origin and the aliens, whom he named "the intelligences", controlled both his body and mind. Davies also discussed his leaving of wives and children when relationships were outgrown.

== Discography ==
=== Studio albums ===
- AFL1-3603 (1980) US Billboard No. 42
- Glamour (1981) US Billboard No. 152
- Chosen People (1983) US Billboard No. 202
- Bug (2002)
- Fractured Mindz (2007)
- I Will Be Me (2013)
- Rippin' Up Time (2014)
- Open Road (2017) with Russ Davies

Soundtrack album

- Village of the Damned (1995) with John Carpenter

=== Live albums ===
- Rock Bottom - Live at The Bottom Line (2000)
- Transformation - Live at The Alex Theatre (2003)
- Rainy Day in June (2004)
- Rippin' Up New York City - Live at the Winery NYC (2015)

Official bootlegs

- Solo Live - Live Solo Performance at Marian College (2000)
- Bugged... Live! (2002)
- Belly Up (2008) - recorded live at the Belly Up Club in San Diego on 29 April 1997, which was at the start of the first major solo tour of the U.S. by Davies
- Around the Galaxy (2009)

=== Compilation albums ===
- The Album That Never Was (1987) - singles recorded for his unreleased debut solo album
- Unfinished Business (1999)
- Kinked (2006 release on Koch Records)
- Hidden Treasures (2011) - released and unreleased tracks recorded for his unreleased debut solo album
- Decade (2018) - unreleased tracks from the 1970s

=== Singles ===
Release date	Title	Chart positions							
Release date	Title	UK	AUS	BEL	GER	NLD	NZ	SWE	NOR
1967	"Death of a Clown"	3	37	5	3	2	10	—	7
January 1968	"Susannah's Still Alive"	20	—	—	27	10	—	18	3
July 1968	"Lincoln County"	—	—	—	—	15	—	—	—
January 1969	"Hold My Hand"	—	—	—	—	—	—	—	—
"—" denotes releases that did not chart or were not released in that territory

=== Other appearances ===
Year	Song	Album	Notes
2003	"Give Me Love (Give Me Peace on Earth)"	Songs from the Material World: A Tribute to George Harrison	George Harrison cover
2012	"Money Maker"	Black and Blue: A Tribute to the Black Keys	with Huw Lloyd-Langton
2012	"My Generation"	Who Are You: An All Star Tribute to The Who	with Knox and Rat Scabies
2013	"After the Ball (1892)"	The Beautiful Old: Turn-of-the-Century Songs	Traditional

=== Demo recordings (The Meta Media Demo Series) ===
- Fortis Green (1999)
- Fragile (2001)

=== Guest appearances ===
- In the Mouth of Madness soundtrack, lead guitar on track one (1995)

=== Projects with Russ Davies ===
- Purusha and the Spiritual Planet as Crystal Radio (1998)
- Two Worlds as The Aschere Project (2010)
