= David Temple =

British conductor and musical director

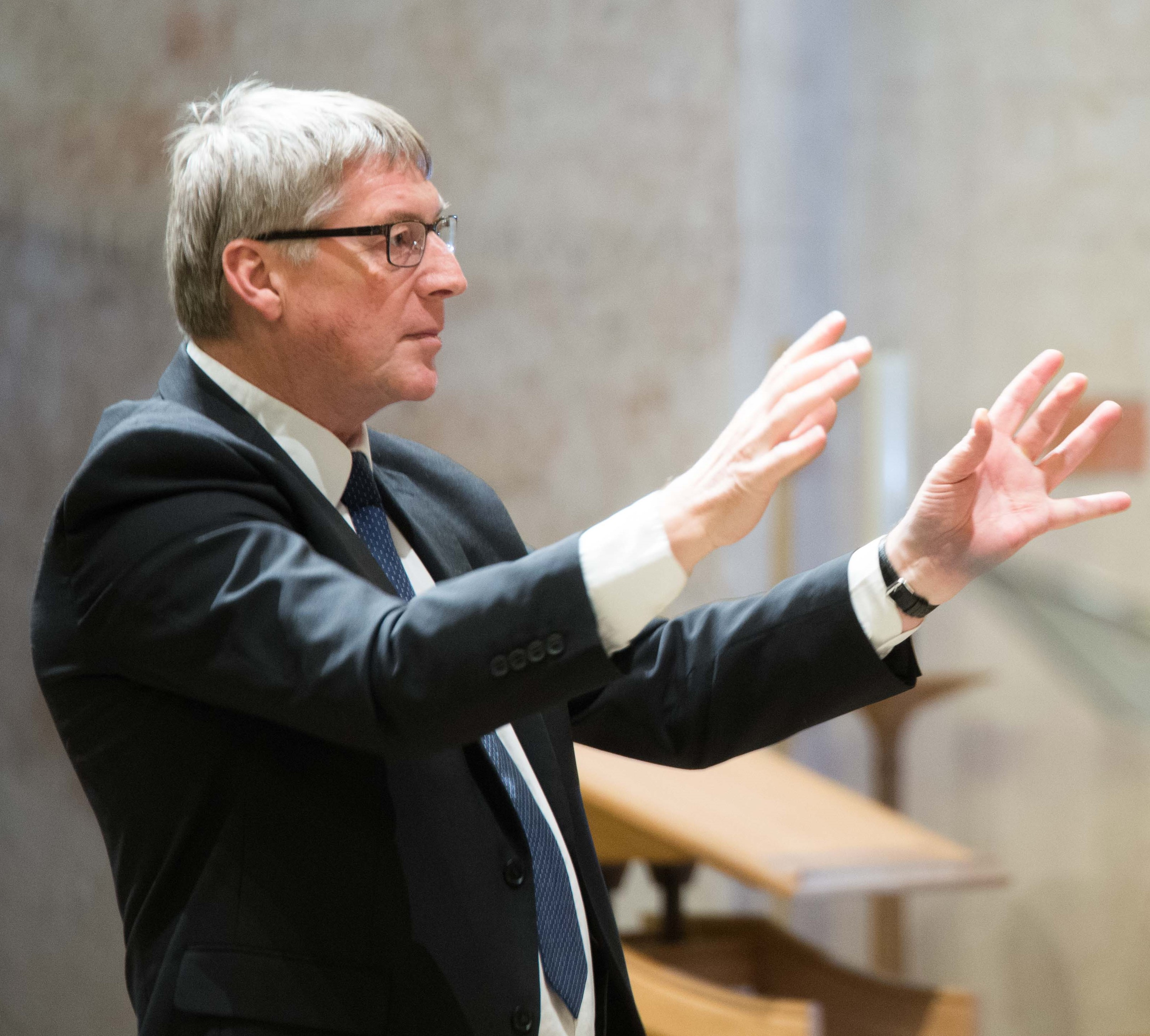
David Temple conducts at St Albans Cathedral (2015)

David Anthony Temple MBE is a British conductor and musical director of Crouch End Festival Chorus and Hertfordshire Chorus. He has conducted at the Barbican Centre, Royal Festival Hall and Symphony Hall, Birmingham, Royal Albert Hall, Sage Gateshead, The Roundhouse, Snape Maltings and St Albans Cathedral.

He came to London in 1972 and joined the London Philharmonic Choir where he sang as a tenor under the chorus master John Alldis, performing with conductors including Boult, Stokowski, Solti, Haitink, Tennstedt, Barenboim, Giulini and Rattle. In 1984 he began his work with the newly formed Crouch End Festival Chorus.

As chorus master of the Norfolk and Norwich Festival, he worked closely with Ray Davies of The Kinks on his choral work The Flatlands, and collaborated with him on live performances from 2007 until 2011, including a performance of The Village Green Preservation Society at the Royal Festival Hall with the London Philharmonic Orchestra, Crouch End Festival Chorus and Ray Davies plus band. He has also toured the US with Ray Davies to promote the CD The Kinks Choral Collection.

Temple has worked with many conductors, including Valery Gergiev, Esa-Pekka Salonen, Semyon Bychkov and Edward Gardner, preparing choirs for major performances. With Crouch End Festival Chorus he recorded Bach's St John Passion (in English) for Chandos Records in 2016, due for release in 2017.

Temple has collaborated closely for many years with Ray Davies, Oasis, and more recently, with Noel Gallagher – as well as Goldfrapp, Procol Harum, Travis, Bombay Bicycle Club, Take That, Robbie Williams and Basement Jaxx. He has appeared at the Glastonbury, Latitude and T-in-the-Park music festivals.

Recording work includes music for the BBC's Doctor Who at Air Studios and soundtracks such as Journey to the Center of the Earth, Prince Caspian and The Awakening. Temple has also prepared both of his choirs for concerts with Ennio Morricone, Andrea Bocelli and Hans Zimmer.

Temple was appointed a Member of the Order of the British Empire (MBE) in the 2018 New Year Honours for services to music.
