= Americana (Ray Davies album) =

2017 album

Studio album by Ray Davies
- Released: 21 April 2017
- Recorded: 2015–2016
- Studio: Konk, London
- Genre: Roots rock
- Length: 58:24
- Label: Legacy
- Producer: Ray Davies; Guy Massey; John Jackson

Ray Davies chronology
See My Friends (2010)	Americana (2017)	Our Country: Americana Act II (2018)

Singles from Americana
- 1. "Poetry" Released: 24 March 2017; 2. "Rock n' Roll Cowboys" Released: 27 March 2017; 3. "The Great Highway" Released: 11 April 2017

Americana is an album by English rock musician Ray Davies, released by Legacy Recordings in April 2017. Like Davies' 2013 book of the same name, it explores his lifelong fascination with the music and culture of the United States, and his experiences of touring and living there. The album features contributions from members of American country rock band the Jayhawks.

== Background ==
Although thought of as a quintessentially British songwriter, Ray Davies grew up fascinated by American music and cinema. The Kinks, the band he formed with his brother Dave, were initially heavily influenced by American musical styles, particularly rhythm and blues. When a permit refusal imposed by the American Federation of Musicians effectively banned the Kinks from touring the United States between 1965 and 1969, Davies began to focus his songwriting on more British themes, resulting in albums such as The Kinks Are the Village Green Preservation Society (1968) and Arthur (Or the Decline and Fall of the British Empire) (1969). Following the lifting of the ban and their return to the US, the Kinks released the country rock-tinged Muswell Hillbillies (1971), with Davies' writing exploring the influences of American culture on his North London upbringing.

Davies' US connections were strengthened when the Kinks successfully reinvented themselves as an arena rock act, extensively touring North America in the late 1970s and early 1980s. He also briefly lived in New York City during that era. Following the Kinks' break-up in the 1990s, Davies settled in New Orleans, where in 2004 he was shot in the leg following an altercation with a mugger. In 2013, he published his memoir Americana: The Kinks, the Road and the Perfect Riff, looking back on these experiences and his complex relationship with America.

== Recording ==
Following the release of the book, Davies decided to expand the Americana project with an accompanying album, his first of new solo material since Working Man's Café in 2007. The album was recorded at the Kinks' Konk studios in Hornsey, London, with American country rock group the Jayhawks as Davies' backing band. Jayhawks keyboard player Karen Grotberg duets with Davies on "Message From the Road" and "A Place in Your Heart". The album was produced and arranged by Davies himself, with co-producers Guy Massey and John Jackson. The album was released in 2017. It reached number 15 on the UK charts and 79 in the US.

In the sessions for Americana, Davies recorded sufficient material for a follow-up album. The album Our Country: Americana Act II was released separately in 2018 and reached number 58 on the UK charts.

== Critical reception ==
Professional ratings
Aggregate scores
Source	Rating
Metacritic	80/100
Review scores
Source	Rating
AllMusic	4.5/5 stars
American Songwriter	4/5 stars
Classic Rock	4/5 stars
The Guardian	2/5 stars

At Metacritic, which assigns a normalised rating out of 100 to reviews from critics, Americana received an average score of 80, indicating "generally favourable reviews", based on 19 critics. In his review for AllMusic, Stephen Thomas Erlewine says, "What makes it last are the songs, which are wry, moving, and truthful, which wasn't always the case in his book". Classic Rock described the album as "a resounding success" with Davies "in terrific, matchless voice", while American Songwriter said it was a "first class offering ... and a worthy entry into Ray Davies’ rightfully esteemed catalog". A negative review in The Guardian described the songs as "weedy" and "naff", referring to a track that does not appear on the album and likening the album to "an Alan Partridge-presented country happy hour".

== Track listing ==
All tracks are written by Ray Davies.

No.	Title	Length
1.	"Americana"	4:02
2.	"The Deal"	5:03
3.	"Poetry"	5:05
4.	"Message From the Road"	2:57
5.	"A Place in Your Heart"	5:03
6.	"The Mystery Room"	3:51
7.	"Silent Movie"	1:11
8.	"Rock 'N' Roll Cowboys"	4:21
9.	"Change for Change"	3:23
10.	"The Man Upstairs"	1:37
11.	"I've Heard That Beat Before"	4:03
12.	"A Long Drive Home to Tarzana"	4:59
13.	"The Great Highway"	4:43
14.	"The Invaders"	3:47
15.	"Wings of Fantasy"	4:19

== Personnel ==
Musicians

- Ray Davies – lead vocals, guitars, piano, backing vocals, percussion, spoken word, dropped beer glasses and broken tea cups
- Bill Shanley – acoustic guitars, electric guitars, backing vocals
- Gary Louris – acoustic guitars, electric guitars, backing vocals
- Marc Perlman – bass, backing vocals
- Tim O'Reagan – drums, backing vocals, percussion
- Karen Grotberg – piano, keyboards, lead vocals, backing vocals
- John Jackson – mandolin, violin, acoustic guitars, electric guitars, 12-string guitar, backing vocals, percussion

Technical personnel

- Ray Davies – producer, arranger
- Guy Massey – co-producer, recording and mixing
- John Jackson – co-producer
- Josh Green – recording and mixing
- Bob Ludwig – mastering
