= CEFC =

CEFC may refer to:

- Clean Energy Finance Corporation
- Covenant Evangelical Free Church
- Crouch End Festival Chorus
- CEFC China Energy – a private Chinese conglomerate
- Christ Evangelical Free Church
