= Other People's Lives =

Studio album by Ray Davies
- Released: 7 February 2006
- Studio: Konk Studios, Hornsey, London
- Genre: Rock
- Length: 61:23
- Label: V2
- Producer: Ray Davies

Ray Davies chronology
The Storyteller (1998)	Other People's Lives (2006)	Working Man's Café (2007)

Professional ratings
Review scores
Source	Rating
Allmusic	4/5 stars
Pitchfork Media	(6.7/10)
Rolling Stone	3.5/5 stars
Encyclopedia of Popular Music	4/5 stars

Other People's Lives is the third studio album by the English singer-songwriter Ray Davies. It reached the top 40 in the UK Albums Chart in February 2006 and 122 in the US Billboard 200. Released on V2 Records, it was Davies' third solo album, but his first straightforward studio release.

== Release and reception ==
Promotional singles were distributed to radio for the tracks "Things Are Gonna Change (The Morning After)" and "Over My Head". No singles were commercially released.

The title song appeared in the radio program This American Life, episode 344: "The Competition".

== Track listing ==
All tracks are written by Ray Davies.

No.	Title	Length
1.	"Things Are Gonna Change (The Morning After)"	4:21
2.	"After the Fall"	4:36
3.	"Next Door Neighbour"	3:52
4.	"All She Wrote"	4:10
5.	"Creatures of Little Faith"	3:13
6.	"Run Away from Time"	3:47
7.	"The Tourist"	4:45
8.	"Is There Life After Breakfast?"	4:31
9.	"The Getaway (Lonesome Train)"	6:31
10.	"Other People's Lives"	4:53
11.	"Stand Up Comic"	4:31
12.	"Over My Head"	5:58
13.	"Thanksgiving Day"	6:15
Total length:		61:23

== Personnel ==
- Ray Davies - guitar, piano, Mellotron, Hammond organ, Vox organ, bass guitar, vocals
- Mark Johns - guitar, dobro, slide guitar, E-bow
- Steve Bolton - guitar
- Dick Nolan, Norman Watt-Roy, Dave Swift - bass guitar
- Dylan Howe, Toby Baron - drums
- John Beecham, Mike Cotton, Nick Payn - horn section on "Next Door Neighbor"
- Phil Veacock - saxophone on "Stand Up Comic"
- Matt Winch - trumpet on "Thanksgiving Day"
- Milton McDonald - guitar on "Thanksgiving Day"
- Serge Krebs - SFX effects and loops on "The Tourist"
- Isabel Fructuoso - vocals on "Other People's Lives"
- Alida Giusti, Dick Nolan, Linda McBride, Martin Davies, Martin Rex, Serge Krebs - Konk choir on "Stand Up Comic"

Technical

- Laurie Latham, Graham Dominy - engineer
