= See My Friends (album) =

Studio album by Ray Davies
- Released: 1 November 2010
- Genre: Rock
- Length: 49:15
- Label: Universal
- Producers: Ray Davies and Martyn Berg

Ray Davies chronology
The Kinks Choral Collection (2009)	See My Friends (2010)	Americana (2017)

Professional ratings
Aggregate scores
Source	Rating
Metacritic	51/100
Review scores
Source	Rating
AllMusic	3/5 stars
American Songwriter	2.5/5 stars
Clash	6/10
Classic Rock	6/10
Consequence of Sound	2/5 stars
Mojo	1/5 stars
Q	2/5 stars

See My Friends is a studio album released by Ray Davies with the collaboration of various other artists on 1 November 2010 in Europe and in early 2011 in the United States. The album features reinterpretations of previously released songs written by Davies and recorded by his band the Kinks, each performed with a different guest artist

The album was recorded in Oslo, New York City, New Jersey, Chicago and London. Davies stated: "This project came about almost by accident, with some tracks I had to appreciate the style of the other artists, otherwise it would have sounded unbalanced. And I wanted the album to work as an entire listening experience but each track had a life of its own".

The album includes the last studio recording by Alex Chilton. See My Friends was released seven months after his death. He previously covered "Till The End of The Day" on Big Star's Third/Sister Lovers.

== Critical reception ==
See My Friends was met with "mixed or average" reviews from critics. At Metacritic, which assigns a weighted average rating out of 100 to reviews from mainstream publications, this release received an average score of 51 based on 13 reviews.

Kinks biographer Rob Jovanovic writes that, following the 2009 album The Kinks Choral Collection and other projects in which Davies revisited his past achievements, See My Friends suggested "he couldn't leave it alone". According to Jovanovic, the majority of critics questioned the reason for the album. Among these reviews, Mojo gave it one star out of five, and dismissed Davies and Metallica's version of "You Really Got Me" as a "travesty".

In a review for AllMusic, Stephen Thomas Erlewine wrote: "A tribute album starring the man of honor himself, who also curated the whole affair, See My Friends is a bit of a curious creature. Certainly, Ray Davies' influence is so pervasive he could rope in a number of heavy hitters from a number of different generations." At American Songwriter, Michael Sandlin said "See My Friends proves, if nothing else, that there's simply no force on Earth malevolent enough to destroy a good Ray Davies ditty. CC Baxter of Clash explained: "See My Friends was a labour of love for head Kink Ray Davies, it feels like a personal journey through the past on his part, and a genuine tribute from those who've contributed.

== Commercial performance ==
In the UK, See My Friends peaked at number 12 on the UK Albums Chart, and number 9 in Scotland.

== Track listing ==
All tracks are written by Ray Davies.

No.	Title	Featured artist	Length
1.	"Better Things"	Bruce Springsteen	3:12
2.	"Celluloid Heroes"	Jon Bon Jovi and Richie Sambora	5:18
3.	"Days / This Time Tomorrow"	Mumford & Sons	4:17
4.	"A Long Way from Home"	Lucinda Williams and The 88	3:06
5.	"You Really Got Me"	Metallica	2:15
6.	"Lola"	Paloma Faith	4:32
7.	"Waterloo Sunset"	Jackson Browne	4:06
8.	"Till the End of the Day"	Alex Chilton and The 88	2:40
9.	"Dead End Street"	Amy Macdonald	3:29
10.	"See My Friends"	Spoon	4:00
11.	"This Is Where I Belong"	Black Francis	3:02
12.	"David Watts"	The 88	2:20
13.	"Tired of Waiting for You"	Gary Lightbody	2:49
14.	"All Day and All of the Night" / "Destroyer"	Billy Corgan	3:54
Total length:			49:15

International release
No.	Title	Featured Artist	Length
15.	"Victoria"	Mando Diao	3:18
Total length:			52:33

== Charts ==
Chart performance for See My Friends
Chart (2010)	Peak position
Austrian Albums (Ö3 Austria)	55
Belgian Albums (Ultratop Flanders)	35
Dutch Albums (Album Top 100)	54
French Albums (SNEP)	154
German Albums (Offizielle Top 100)	50
Scottish Albums (Official Charts)	9
UK Albums (Official Charts)	12
US Heatseekers Albums (Billboard)	3
