= Crouch End Festival Chorus =

English choir

- CEFC with musical director, David Temple

Background information
- Origin: Crouch End, London, England
- Genres: Classical, popular music, soundtrack, film score
- Instrument: choral
- Years active: 1984–present
- Labels: Silva Screen, Chandos Records, Signum Records
- Website: http://www.cefc.org.uk

Crouch End Festival Chorus (CEFC) is a symphonic choir based in north London which performs in a range of musical styles, including traditional choral repertoire, contemporary classical, rock, pop and film music.

Led by musical director David Temple, the choir has appeared in the BBC Proms concert series and has performed under the baton of conductors including Esa Pekka-Salonen, Semyon Bychkov, Edward Gardner and Valery Gergiev. CEFC also features on the sound track of films and TV series such as Disney's Prince Caspian, the BBC's Doctor Who and Amazon Prime Video's Good Omens TV series.

CEFC's patrons include the conductor Sir Mark Elder, bass-baritone Bryn Terfel, film music composer Hans Zimmer, rock artists Ray Davies and Noel Gallagher, with whom the choir has performed live and in the recording studio and its co-founder, John Gregson.

David Temple was appointed MBE in the New Year's Honours List in January 2018 for his services to music.

== History and organisation ==
In 1984 John Gregson, the director of the then Crouch End Arts Festival, invited David Temple to become the Festivals' music director. Gregson suggested that the festival should have its own choir and invited Temple to become its chorus master. A scratch choir of amateur singers was formed to perform Verdi's Requiem and the choir was given the name Crouch End Festival Chorus. Its membership has grown to around 150 singers who rehearse weekly in Muswell Hill and perform at Alexandra Palace Theatre, and at venues across London including the Barbican Hall, Royal Festival Hall, Queen Elizabeth Hall, and Royal Albert Hall.

CEFC is a charitable company run by a board of trustees elected by its members, with the day-to-day functions of the organisation carried out by a management committee of volunteers from the choir's ranks. Members join the choir via a formal audition and all singers are re-auditioned every three years.

== Classical repertoire ==
At its own concerts CEFC performs choral music over a wide chronological range from Thomas Tallis in the sixteenth century to new commissions. Over the course of its existence up to summer 2022 it has performed the work of 113 composers from John Adams to Hans Zimmer. The major British composers, Elgar, Vaughan Williams, Tippett and Britten feature regularly on concert programmes, as do European composers including Bach, Beethoven, Mozart, Felix Mendelssohn, Poulenc and Stravinsky, and Americans including Bernstein, John Adams and Philip Glass. In recent years CEFC has sought to include women composers in its programmes, including Fanny Mendelssohn Hensel, Rani Arbo, and Lillie Harris, and commissions from Jessica Curry and Laura Bowler.

== Commissions ==
CEFC has a long history of commissioning and performing new choral works.

Date	Composer	Title
1985	Ian Lawrence	African Hodie
1990	Howard Haigh	Saeta
1993	John Woolrich	Far From Home
1994	David Bedford	I Am Going Home With Thee
1994	Simon Bainbridge	Herbsttag
1994	Sally Beamish	Love Is Leaping
1997	Joby Talbot	Finding Silence
1998	Robert Hugill	Here Be Angels
1998	Paul Patterson	Hell's Angels
2000	Joby Talbot	The Same Dog
2001	David Bedford	The City And The Stars
2004	Orlando Gough	Shift
2009	Roland Perrin	Heaven On Earth
2009	Matthew Ferraro	The Tension Of Opposites
2012	James McCarthy	17 Days
2014	Murray Gold	...When My Brother Fell Into The River
2014	Will Todd	Rage Against The Dying Of The Light
2014	Bernard Hughes	Salve Regina
2014	James McCarthy	Malala
2015	Roland Perrin	Lansky: The Mob's Money Man
2017	Laura Bowler	navigating the dog watch
2018	Ryan Latimer	Frigates & Folly
2021	Jessica Curry	Echo

== Other classical concerts ==
CEFC have appeared regularly at the BBC Proms since 2001.

Date	Additional information	Work	Other performers and conductor
28 August 2001		Scriabin, Prometheus: The Poem of Fire	Kirov Orchestra, Valery Gergiev
29 August 2002		Sibelius, Kullervo	London Symphony Chorus, BBC Symphony Orchestra, Thomas Adès
11 August 2003		Prokofiev, Alexander Nevsky	London Philharmonic Choir, Royal Philharmonic Orchestra, Daniele Gatti
9 September 2005		Ravel, Daphnis and Chloé	Helsinki Philharmonic Orchestra, Esa-Pekka Salonen
31 August 2008		Verdi, Requiem	BBC Symphony Chorus, BBC Symphony Orchestra, Jiří Bělohlávek
2 August 2009		Berlioz, Te Deum	Bach Choir, Trinity Boys Choir, St Paul’s Cathedral Choir, BBC Symphony Chorus, BBC Symphony Orchestra, Susanna Mälkki
16 July 2010	First Night of the Proms	Mahler, Symphony No. 8	Westminster Cathedral Choristers, St Paul’s Cathedral Choristers, Westminster Abby Choristers, Sydney Philharmonia Choirs, BBC Symphony Chorus, BBC Symphony Orchestra, Jiří Bělohlávek
12 August 2012		Schoenberg, Gurre-lieder	New London Chamber Choir, BBC Singers, BBC Symphony Chorus, BBC Symphony Orchestra, Jukka-Pekka Saraste
20 July 2014	BBC Sport Prom	Orff, Carmina Burana (extracts), Richard Rodgers, ‘You’ll never walk alone’ from Carousel, Freddie Mercury, ‘We are the Champions’	BBC Concert Orchestra, Rebecca Miller
18 August 2014		Rachmaninov, The Bells	BBC Symphony Chorus, BBC Symphony Orchestra, Edward Gardner
9 September 2015		Webster, In the Sweet By and By, Zeuner, Ye Christian Heralds, Marsh, Jesus, Lover of My Soul, Mason, Nearer, My God, to Thee, Ives, Symphony No. 4	BBC Symphony Orchestra, Andrew Litton
31 July 2016		Lera Auerbach, Symphony No. 3: The Infant Minstrel and His Peculiar Menagerie	BBC Symphony Orchestra, Edward Gardner
27 July 2017	London Premiere	Mark Simpson, The Immortal	London Voices, BBC Philharmonic, Juanjo Mena
9 September 2017	Proms in the Park: Hyde Park	Songs of Ray Davies	Ray Davies, BBC Concert Orchestra, Richard Balcombe
8 September 2019	European Premiere	John Luther Adams, In the Name of the Earth	BBC Symphony Chorus, Hackney Empire Community Choir, London International Gospel Choir, London Philharmonic Choir, London Symphony Chorus, LSO Community Choir, Victoria Park Singers
15 July 2022	First Night of the Proms	Verdi, Requiem	BBC Symphony Chorus, BBC Symphony Orchestra, Sakari Oramao

CEFC is also frequently invited to collaborate with major orchestras. Recent performances include Britten's War Requiem with the BBC Symphony Orchestra and Chorus under Semyon Bychkov in November 2013, Berlioz's Grande Messe des Morts with the BBC Symphony Chorus and Orchestra under François-Xavier Roth in November 2016, Prokofiev's Cantata for the 20th Anniversary of the October Revolution with the Philharmonia Orchestra under Vladimir Ashkenazy in May 2018 and Beethoven's Symphony No. 9 with the Philharmonia under Jakub Hrůša in April 2022.

== Popular music ==
In 2010, CEFC singers joined patron and regular collaborator Ray Davies on stage at the Glastonbury Festival performing to an audience of 50,000 people. The following year, the choir appeared again with Ray Davies in the final concert of the Meltdown Festival curated by the artist for the Royal Festival Hall. Also in 2011 came a performance with Basement Jaxx at the Barbican.

CEFC's working relationship with Noel Gallagher began in 2008 with an Oasis gig for the BBC's Electric Proms. After contributing to the debut album by Noel Gallagher's High Flying Birds in 2012, the choir toured with the band throughout the UK, and again in 2015.

== Film and TV ==
CEFC features on a number of original film soundtracks including The Awakening (2011) Prince Caspian (2008), and Rocketman (2019) as well as in music composed for the BBC's classic sci-fi series Dr Who. Composers Hans Zimmer and Ennio Morricone have both booked CEFC to perform in live concerts of their music.

== Recordings ==
The choir has made recordings of Bach's St John Passion and Britten's Saint Nicolas and A Ceremony of Carols, conducted by David Temple. They have also recorded Parry's Judith, conducted by William Vann.

The choir has credits on more than one hundred CDs including albums by Lesley Garrett, Katherine Jenkins, Alfie Boe, and Kate Royal, and by rock and pop artists Travis, The Divine Comedy, Robbie Williams, Ray Davies, and Noel Gallagher's High Flying Birds. Ray Davies' The Kinks Choral Collection featuring CEFC reached the UK top 30 best-selling albums in 2009 and Noel Gallagher's High Flying Birds achieved the top spot on the Official UK Chart in 2011.
