= Celluloid Heroes =

Single by the Kinks

from the album Everybody's in Show-Biz
- B-side: "Hot Potatoes"
- Released: 24 November 1972
- Recorded: May–June 1972
- Studio: Morgan (London)
- Genre: Soft rock
- Length: 6:19 (album/UK single version); 4:39 (US single edit)
- Label: RCA 2299
- Songwriter: Ray Davies
- Producer: Ray Davies

The Kinks singles chronology
"Supersonic Rocket Ship" (1972)	"Celluloid Heroes" (1972)	"Sitting In The Midday Sun" (1973)

Music video
- "Celluloid Heroes" on YouTube

"Celluloid Heroes" is a song performed by the English rock band the Kinks and written by their lead vocalist and principal songwriter, Ray Davies. It debuted on their eleventh studio album Everybody's in Show-Biz (1972).

The song names several famous actors of 20th century film, and also mentions Los Angeles's Hollywood Boulevard, alluding to its Hollywood Walk of Fame. The actors mentioned are Greta Garbo, Rudolph Valentino, Bela Lugosi, Bette Davis, Marilyn Monroe, George Sanders, and Mickey Rooney, although the verse mentioning the latter three is omitted in some recorded versions of the song (e.g. on One for the Road).

== Background ==
An ode to classic Hollywood icons, "Celluloid Heroes" analyses the juxtaposition between success and failure in the context of American show business. Ray Davies, who wrote the song, had spent time in Hollywood and found amusement in "the ironic fact that the stars were on the street and you could walk all over them." He explained the song's meaning:

It's one of those songs that's a very personal song. But it means something to everybody who's been on that strip of, you know, Hollywood. And I wrote it because the duality. You know, once success walks hand in hand with failure, and it's a comment on the world I work in - show business, whatever you call it, entertainment, rock music - it does. I mean, you're as good as your last record. You're lucky if people remember the hits.

The song has since been singled out by Dave Davies as a standout track by the band: "One of my favorite songs ever, by anybody. I remember when we were just starting out down the road with tidying up the lyrics. That really filled me with a lot of emotion because it is quite an incredible idea anyway, all those [movie] stars, names and handprints being on those stars. There are all these great stars immortalized on pavement, in concrete." Kinks keyboardist John Gosling was similarly effusive, recalling, "When Ray put down the vocals to that, I stood in awe of the man!"

== Release and reception ==
The track was released as the second single from the album. In the UK, the single features the full album version which runs to over six minutes, but the US single used a more corporate-radio-friendly edit which is almost two minutes shorter. Although their previous single had been a top 20 hit on the UK Singles Chart, "Celluloid Heroes" failed to chart.

The song appears on the band's live album One for the Road (1980) and was re-recorded for the 2009 album The Kinks Choral Collection. The song was also the title track of a 1976 collection featuring material originally released while recording for the RCA label, The Kinks' Greatest: Celluloid Heroes.

Record World said of the studio single release that "Ray Davies' masterpiece song about glitter and glory along Sunset Strip displays the Kinks at their very best and should be a smash." Reviewing the live single, Record World called it "perhaps one of Ray Davies' finest compositions".

== List of actors mentioned in the lyrics ==
- Greta Garbo
- Rudolph Valentino
- Bela Lugosi
- Bette Davis
- George Sanders
- Marilyn Monroe
- Mickey Rooney

== Cover versions ==
- Joan Jett recorded this song for her all-covers album The Hit List.
- A live performance of this track (featuring Ray Davies) appeared as the B-side to Bon Jovi's 2002 single "Misunderstood".
- Steve Vai recorded a cover of this song on his album The Elusive Light and Sound Vol. 1.
- British actor and singer Tim Curry frequently performed this song during his tours in the late 70s.
- Finnish singer-songwriter Juice Leskinen translated and recorded this song in Finnish as "Paperitähdet".
- Renaissance-inspired folk rock band Blackmore's Night recorded the song for their album Autumn Sky.
- The song appeared on Ray Davies' 2010 album See My Friends, featuring Jon Bon Jovi and Richie Sambora.
- Australian actor Reg Livermore performs the song in his Betty Blokk-Buster Follies show, the song also appears on the soundtrack.
- Australian singer Jeannie Lewis recorded the song on the 1974 album Looking Backwards to Tomorrow. There is YouTube footage of her performing the song on The Norman Gunston Show.
- Pauly Shore covered the song on his YouTube channel in 2020.
