= Our Country: Americana Act II =

Studio album by Ray Davies
- Released: 29 June 2018
- Recorded: 2017–2018
- Studio: Konk Studios and Fluff; Mr. Lambert's Flat; The Attic on the Hill
- Genre: Rock
- Length: 61:06
- Label: Legacy
- Producer: Ray Davies

Ray Davies chronology
| Americana (2017) | Our Country: Americana Act II (2018) |

Our Country: Americana Act II is an album by English rock musician Ray Davies, released by Legacy Recordings in June 2018. Serving as a follow-up and sequel to Davies' 2017 album Americana, the album is made up of material recorded during the sessions for its predecessor, with American country rock band the Jayhawks once again contributing. As with the previous album, Americana Act II explores the themes relating to Davies' experiences of American culture and of living and touring in the United States.

== Track listing ==
All tracks are written by Ray Davies

| No. | Title | Length |
|---|---|---|
| 1. | "Our Country" | 3:15 |
| 2. | "The Invaders" | 2:29 |
| 3. | "Back in the Day" | 2:41 |
| 4. | "Oklahoma U.S.A" | 4:11 |
| 5. | "Bringing Up Baby" | 3:10 |
| 6. | "The Getaway" | 5:24 |
| 7. | "The Take" | 4:59 |
| 8. | "We Will Get There" | 3:47 |
| 9. | "The Real World" | 3:40 |
| 10. | "A Street Called Hope" | 3:22 |
| 11. | "The Empty Room" | 3:20 |
| 12. | "Calling Home" | 2:36 |
| 13. | "Louisiana Sky" | 2:19 |
| 14. | "March of the Zombies" | 2:59 |
| 15. | "The Big Weird" | 3:34 |
| 16. | "Tony And Bob" | 1:10 |
| 17. | "The Big Guy" | 3:33 |
| 18. | "Epilogue" | 1:16 |
| 19. | "Muswell Kills" | 3:21 |

== Personnel ==
Musicians

- Ray Davies – lead vocals, guitars, piano, backing vocals, percussion, harmonica, spoken word, dropped beer glasses and broken tea cups
- Bill Shanley – acoustic guitars, electric guitars, backing vocals
- Gary Louris – acoustic guitars, electric guitars, backing vocals
- Marc Perlman – bass, backing vocals
- Tim O'Reagan – drums, backing vocals, percussion
- Karen Grotberg – piano, keyboards, lead vocals, backing vocals
- John Jackson – mandolin, violin, acoustic guitars, electric guitars, 12-string guitar, backing vocals, percussion

Technical personnel

- Ray Davies – producer, arranger
- Guy Massey – co-producer, recording and mixing
- John Jackson – co-producer
- Josh Green – recording and mixing
- Bob Ludwig – mastering
