= Ray Davies =

English musician (born 1944)

Sir Ray Davies CBE
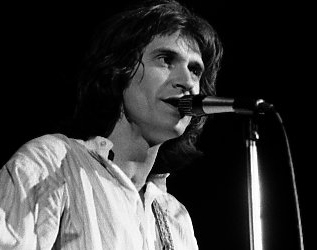
- Davies performing in 1977

Background information
- Also known as: Raymond Douglas, Godfather of Britpop
- Born: Raymond Douglas Davies; 21 June 1944 (age 82); Fortis Green, London, England
- Genres: Rock; pop
- Occupations: Musician; singer; songwriter
- Instruments: Vocals; guitar; harmonica; keyboards
- Years active: 1962–present
- Formerly of: The Kinks

Sir Raymond Douglas Davies (born 21 June 1944) is an English musician. He was the lead vocalist, rhythm guitarist and primary songwriter for the rock band the Kinks, with his younger brother Dave providing lead guitar and backing vocals; the Davies brothers were the band's only consistent members. He has also acted in, directed and produced shows for theatre and television. Known for focusing his lyrics on rock bands, English culture, nostalgia and social satire, he is often referred to as the "Godfather of Britpop", though he disputes this title. He was inducted into the Rock and Roll Hall of Fame as a member of the Kinks in 1990. After the dissolution of the Kinks in 1996, he embarked on a solo career.

== Early years ==
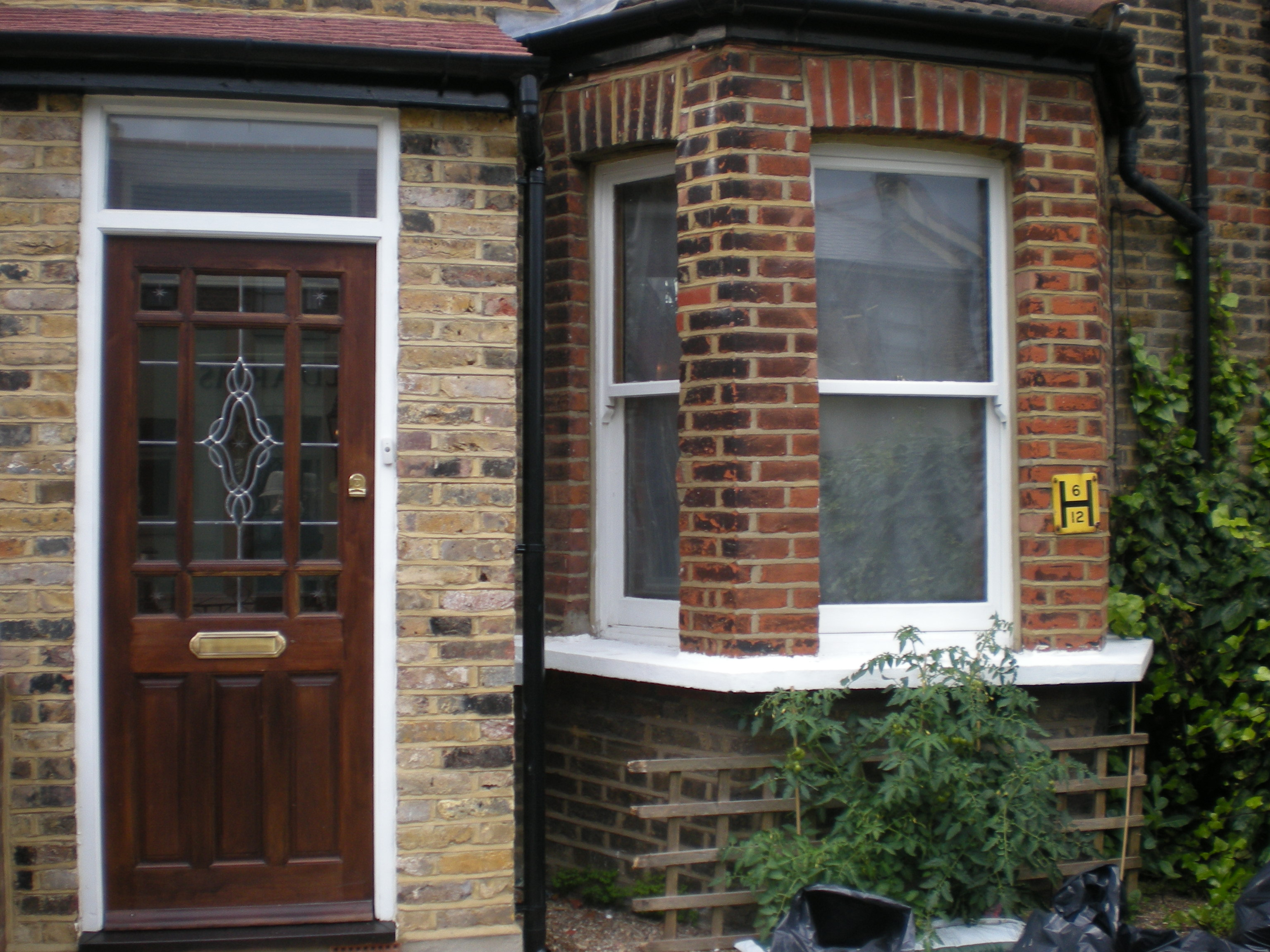
6 Denmark Terrace, birthplace of the Davies brothers

Raymond Douglas Davies was born at 6 Denmark Terrace in the Fortis Green area of London on 21 June 1944. He is the seventh of eight children born to working-class parents, including six elder sisters and younger brother Dave Davies. His father, Frederick George Davies, was a slaughterhouse worker. Frederick liked to hang out in pubs and was considered a ladies' man. He was born in Islington and his registered birth name was Frederick George Kelly.

Frederick's father, Henry Kelly, was a greengrocer who married Amy Elizabeth Smith at St Luke's Church in Kentish Town in 1887, and they had two children, Charles Henry and Frederick George. However, the marriage failed and Amy moved in with Harry Davies, bringing her two small children and her mother. Harry Davies, born in Minsterley in 1878, was an ostler who had moved with his family from Shropshire to Islington. Frederick George had changed his surname to Davies by the time he married Annie Florence Willmore (1905–1987) in Islington in 1924. Annie came from a "sprawling family". She had a sharp tongue and could be crude and forceful.

When Davies was still a small child, one of his older sisters became a star of the dance halls, and soon had a child out of wedlock by an African man, an unauthorised immigrant who subsequently disappeared from her life. The child, a daughter, was ultimately raised by Ray's mother. Ray attended William Grimshaw Secondary Modern School in Muswell Hill (now called Fortismere School) along with Rod Stewart. His first Spanish guitar was a birthday gift from his eldest sister Rene, who died at the age of 31 from a heart attack on the day before Ray's 13th birthday, while she was out dancing at the Lyceum Ballroom in the Strand, London in June 1957.

== 1960s–1980s ==
=== The Kinks' early years ===
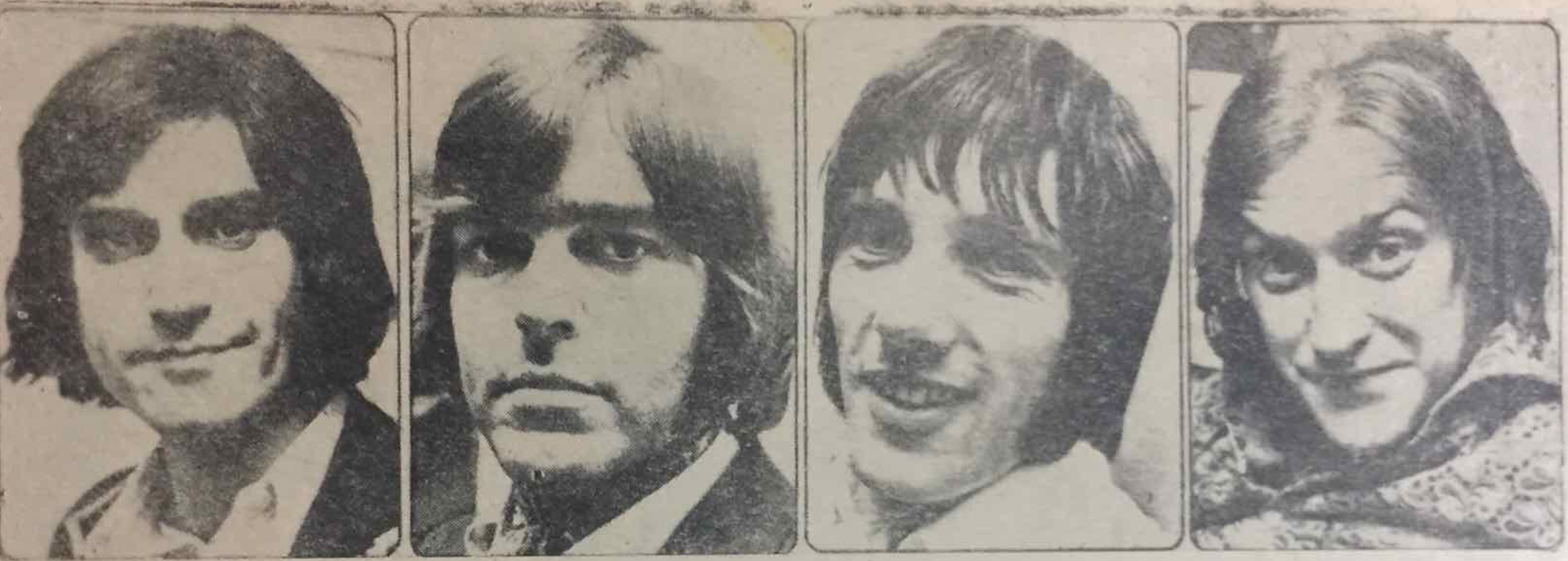
Kinks individual photos in 1970, with Ray on the far left

Davies was an art student at Hornsey College of Art in London in 1962–63. In late 1962 he became increasingly interested in music. At a Hornsey College Christmas dance, he sought advice from Alexis Korner who was playing at the dance with Blues Incorporated, and Korner introduced him to Giorgio Gomelsky, a promoter and future manager of the Yardbirds. Gomelsky arranged for Davies to play at his Piccadilly Club with the Dave Hunt Rhythm & Blues Band, and on New Year's Eve, the Ray Davies Quartet opened for Cyril Stapleton at the Lyceum Ballroom. A few days later he became the permanent guitarist for the Dave Hunt Band, an engagement that would only last about six weeks. The band were the house band at Gomelsky's new venture, the Crawdaddy Club in Richmond-upon-Thames. When the Dave Hunt Band were snowed in during the coldest winter since 1740, Gomelsky offered a gig to a new band called the Rolling Stones, who had previously supported Hunt at the Piccadilly and would take over the residency. Davies then joined the Hamilton King Band until June 1963. The Kinks (then known as the Ramrods) spent the summer supporting Rick Wayne on a tour of US airbases.

After the Kinks obtained a recording contract in early 1964, Davies emerged as the chief songwriter and de facto leader of the band, especially after the band's breakthrough success with his early composition "You Really Got Me", which was released as the band's third single in August of that year. Davies led the Kinks through a period of musical experimentation between 1966 and 1975, with notable artistic achievements and commercial success.

"You Really Got Me" audio file

The Kinks' early recordings of 1964 ranged from covers of R&B standards like "Long Tall Sally" and "Got Love If You Want It" to the chiming, melodic beat music of Ray Davies's earliest original compositions for the band, "You Still Want Me" and "Something Better Beginning", to the more influential proto-metal, protopunk, power chord-based hard rock of the band's first two hit singles, "You Really Got Me" and "All Day and All of the Night".

However, by 1965, this raucous, hard-driving early style had gradually given way to the softer and more introspective sound of "Tired of Waiting for You", "Nothin' in the World Can Stop Me Worryin' 'Bout That Girl", "Set Me Free", "I Go to Sleep" and "Ring the Bells". With the eerie, droning "See My Friends"—inspired by the untimely death of the Davies brothers' older sister Rene in June 1957—the band began to show signs of expanding their musical palette even further. A rare foray into early psychedelic rock, "See My Friends" is credited by Jonathan Bellman as the first Western pop song to integrate Indian raga sounds—released six months before the Beatles' "Norwegian Wood (This Bird Has Flown)".

=== Mid-period (1965–1975) ===
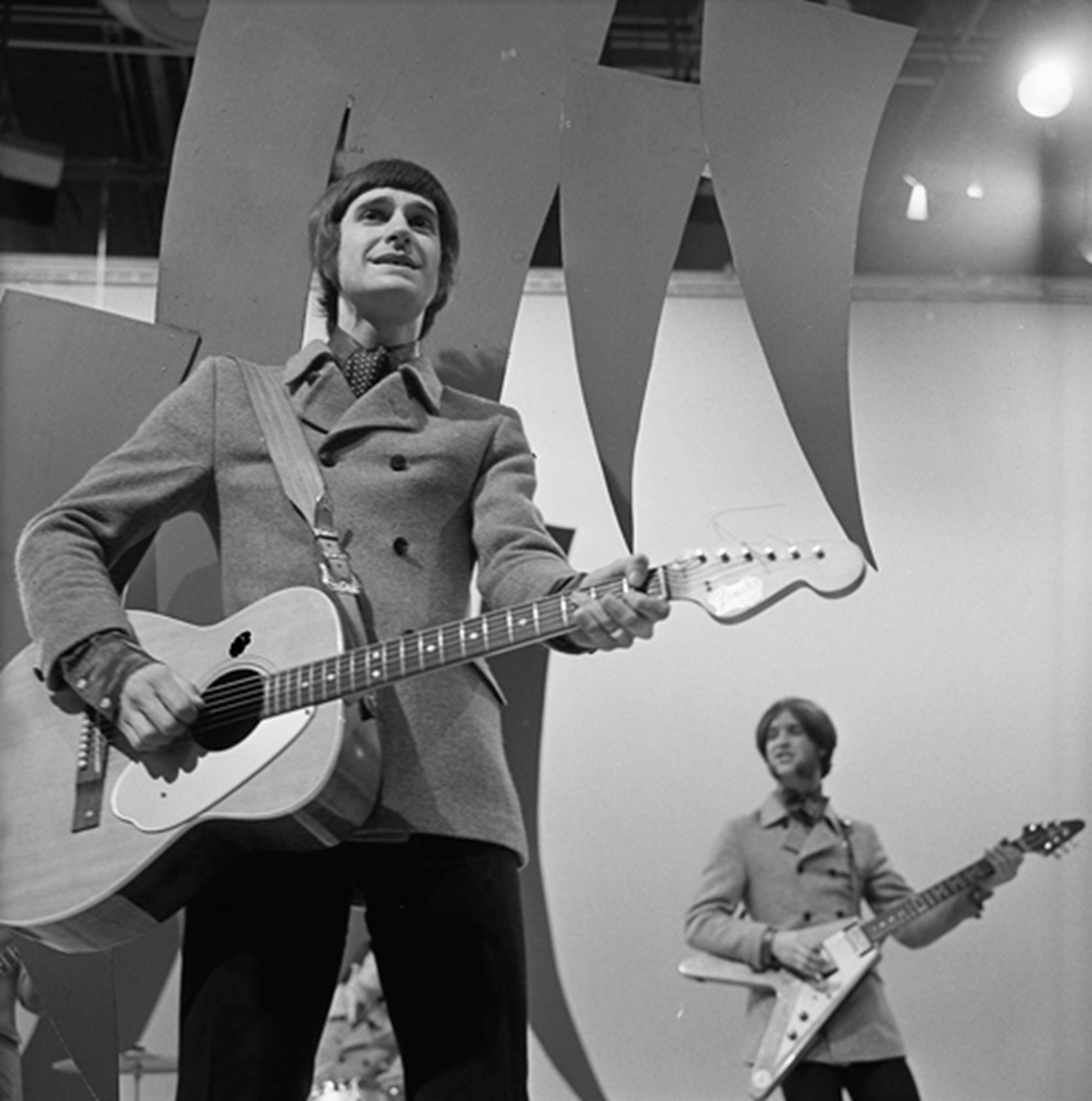
Ray Davies with his brother Dave in background, performing with the Kinks (Dutch TV, 1967)

Beginning with "A Well Respected Man" and "Where Have All the Good Times Gone" (both recorded in the summer of 1965), Davies's lyrics assumed a new sociological character. He began to explore the aspirations and frustrations of common working-class people, with particular emphasis on the psychological effects of the British class system. Face to Face (1966), the first Kinks album composed solely of original material, was a creative breakthrough. As the band began to experiment with theatrical sound effects and baroque musical arrangements (Nicky Hopkins played harpsichord on several tracks), Davies's songwriting fully acquired its distinctive elements of narrative, observation and wry social commentary. His topical songs took aim at the complacency and indolence of wealthy playboys and the upper class ("A House in the Country", "Sunny Afternoon"), the heedless ostentation of a self-indulgent spendthrift nouveau riche ("Most Exclusive Residence For Sale"), and even the mercenary nature of the music business itself ("Session Man").

By late 1966, Davies was addressing the bleakness of life at the lower end of the social spectrum: released together as the complementary A-B sides of a single, "Dead End Street" and "Big Black Smoke" were powerful neo-Dickensian sketches of urban poverty. Other songs like "Situation Vacant" (1967) and "Shangri-La" (1969) hinted at the helpless sense of insecurity and emptiness underlying the materialistic values adopted by the English working class. In a similar vein, "Dedicated Follower of Fashion" (1966) wittily satirized the consumerism and celebrity worship of Carnaby Street and 'Swinging London', while "David Watts" (1967) humorously expressed the wounded feelings of a plain schoolboy who envies the grace and privileges enjoyed by a charismatic upper class student.

The Kinks have been called "the most adamantly British of the Brit Invasion bands" on account of Ray Davies's abiding fascination with England's imperial past and his tender, bittersweet evocations of "a vanishing, romanticized world of village greens, pubs and public schools". During the band's mid-period, he wrote many cheerfully eccentric—and often ironic—celebrations of traditional English culture and living: "Village Green" (1966), "Afternoon Tea" and "Autumn Almanac" (both 1967), "The Last of the Steam-Powered Trains" (1968), "Victoria" (1969), "Have a Cuppa Tea" (1971) and "Cricket" (1973). In other songs, Davies revived the style of British music hall and trad jazz: "Dedicated Follower of Fashion", "Sunny Afternoon", "Dandy" and "Little Miss Queen of Darkness" (all 1966); "Mister Pleasant" and "End of the Season" (both 1967); "Sitting By the Riverside" and "All of My Friends Were There" (both 1968); "She's Bought a Hat Like Princess Marina" (1969); "Acute Schizophrenia Paranoia Blues" and "Alcohol" (both 1971); "Look a Little on the Sunny Side" (1972); and "Holiday Romance" (1975). Occasionally, he varied the group's sound with more disparate musical influences, such as raga ("Fancy", 1966), bossa nova ("No Return", 1967) and calypso ("I'm on an Island", 1965; "Monica", 1968; "Apeman", 1970; "Supersonic Rocket Ship", 1972).

Davies often writes about giving up worldly ambition for the simple rewards of love and domesticity ("This is Where I Belong", 1966; "Two Sisters", 1967; "The Way Love Used to Be", 1971; "Sweet Lady Genevieve", 1973; "You Make It All Worthwhile", 1974), or extols the consolations of friendship and memory ("Waterloo Sunset", 1967; "Days", 1968; "Do You Remember Walter?", 1968; "Picture Book", 1968; "Young and Innocent Days", 1969; "Moments", 1971; "Schooldays", 1975). Yet another perennial Ray Davies theme is the championing of individualistic personalities and lifestyles ("I'm Not Like Everybody Else", 1966; "Johnny Thunder", 1968; "Monica", 1968; "Lola", 1970; "Celluloid Heroes", 1972; "Where Are They Now?", 1973; "Sitting in the Midday Sun", 1973). On his 1967 song "Waterloo Sunset", the singer finds a fleeting sense of contentment in the midst of urban drabness and solitude.

Davies's work for the Kinks later explored a social conscience. For example, "Holiday in Waikiki" (1966) deplored the commercialisation of a once unspoiled indigenous culture. Similarly, "God's Children" and "Apeman" (both 1970), and the songs "20th Century Man", "Complicated Life" and "Here Come the People in Grey" from Muswell Hillbillies (1971), passionately decried industrialization and bureaucracy in favour of simple pastoral living. The band's acclaimed 1968 concept album The Kinks are the Village Green Preservation Society gave an affectionate embrace to "Merry England" nostalgia and advocated the preservation of traditional English country village and hamlet life.

A definitive testament to Davies's reputation as a songwriter of insight, empathy and wit can be heard on the Kinks' landmark 1969 album Arthur (Or the Decline and Fall of the British Empire). Originally conceived as the soundtrack to a television play that was never produced, the band's first rock opera affectionately chronicled the trials and tribulations of a working-class everyman and his family from the very end of the Victorian era through the First World War and Second World War, the postwar austerity years, and up to the 1960s. The overall theme of the record was partly inspired by the life of Ray and Dave Davies's brother-in-law, Arthur Anning, who had married their elder sister Rose—herself the subject of an earlier Kinks song, "Rosie Won't You Please Come Home" (1966)—and had emigrated to Australia after the war. Throughout a dozen evocative songs, Arthur fulfills its ambitious subtitle as Davies embellishes an intimate family chronicle with satirical observations about the shifting mores of the English working class in response to the declining fortunes of the British Empire.

The Kinks followed up Arthur with Lola Versus Powerman and the Moneygoround, Part One (1970), a satirical take on the travails of the recording industry. This album proved to be another critical achievement as well as a commercial hit, spawning "Lola", their first US Top Ten single since "Tired of Waiting for You" in 1965. Lola Versus Powerman and the Moneygoround, Part One would also prove to be the band's final album before signing with RCA Records. This period on the RCA label (1971–75) produced Muswell Hillbillies, Everybody's in Show-Biz, Preservation Act 1 and Act 2, Soap Opera and Schoolboys in Disgrace.

=== Later sound (1976–1984) ===
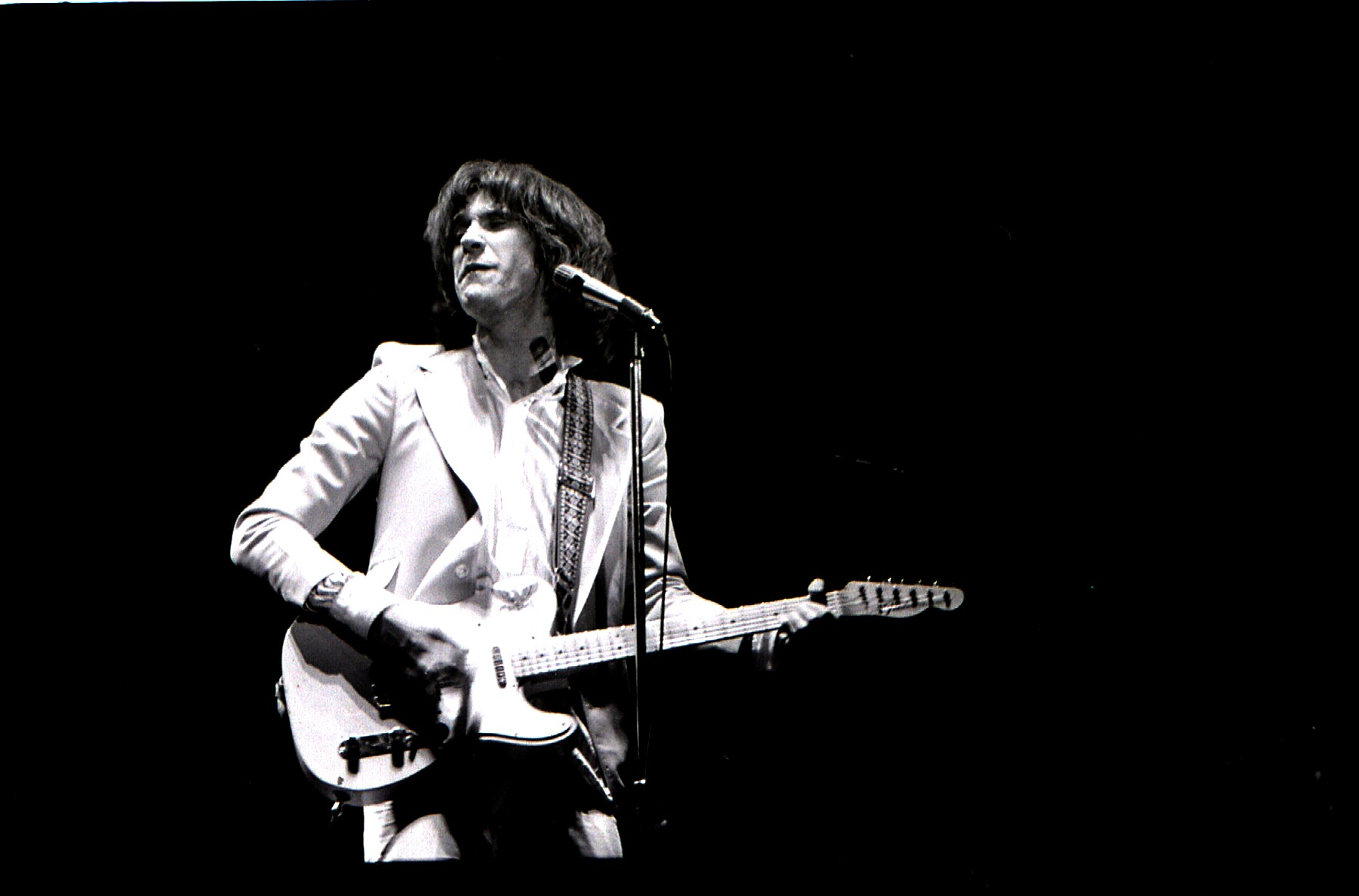
Ray Davies performing in Toronto, 1977

When the Kinks changed record labels from RCA to Arista in 1976, Davies abandoned his recent propensity for ambitious, theatrical concept albums and rock operas (see above) and returned to writing more basic, straightforward songs. During this decade the group founded their own London recording studio "Konk" which employed newer production techniques to achieve a more refined sound on the albums Sleepwalker (1977) and Misfits (1978). Davies's focus shifted to wistful ballads of restless alienation ("Life on the Road", "Misfits"), meditations on the inner lives of obsessed pop fans ("Juke Box Music", "A Rock 'n' Roll Fantasy"), and exhortations of carpe diem ("Life Goes On", "Live Life", "Get Up"). A notable single from late 1977 reflected the contemporary influence of punk rock, "Father Christmas" (A-side) and "Prince of the Punks" (B-side—inspired by Davies's troubled collaboration with Tom Robinson).

By the early 1980s, the Kinks revived their commercial fortunes considerably by adopting a much more mainstream arena rock style; and the band's four remaining studio albums for Arista—Low Budget (1979), Give the People What They Want (1981), State of Confusion (1983) and Word of Mouth (1984)—showcased a decidedly canny and opportunistic approach. On "(Wish I Could Fly Like) Superman", Davies vented his existential angst about the 1979 energy crisis over a thumping disco beat; on "A Gallon of Gas", he addressed the same concern over a traditional acoustic twelve-bar blues shuffle. In contrast, "Better Things" (1981), "Come Dancing" (1982), "Don't Forget to Dance" (1983) and "Good Day" (1984) were sentimental songs of hope and nostalgia for the aging Air Raid Generation. However, with "Catch Me Now I'm Falling" (1979), "Destroyer" (1981), "Clichés of the World (B Movie)" (1983) and "Do It Again" (1984), the Davies brothers created heavy-riffing hard rock that conveyed an attitude of bitter cynicism and world-weary disillusionment.

I write songs because I get angry, and now I'm at the stage where it's not good enough to brush it off with humour.

— NME, June 1978

== 1990s–present ==
Aside from the lengthy Kinks discography, Davies has released seven solo albums: the 1985 release Return to Waterloo (which accompanied a television film he wrote and directed), the 1998 release The Storyteller, Other People's Lives in early 2006, Working Man's Café in October 2007, The Kinks Choral Collection in June 2009, Americana in April 2017, and its sequel, Our Country: Americana Act II in June 2018.

In 1986, Davies contributed the track "Quiet Life" to the soundtrack of the Julien Temple film Absolute Beginners that is a musical film adapted from Colin MacInnes's book of the same name about life in late-1950s London. The song was released as a single. Davies appeared in the film, in which he also sang "Quiet Life".

In 1990, Davies was inducted, with the Kinks, into the Rock and Roll Hall of Fame and, in 2005, into the UK Music Hall of Fame.

Davies published his "unauthorised autobiography", X-Ray, in 1994. In 1997, he published a book of short stories titled Waterloo Sunset. He has made three films, Return to Waterloo in 1985, Weird Nightmare (a documentary about Charles Mingus) in 1991, and Americana.

Davies was appointed Commander of the Order of the British Empire, by Queen Elizabeth II, in the 2004 New Year Honours.

In 2005, Davies released The Tourist, a four-song EP, in the UK; and Thanksgiving Day, a five-song EP, in the US.

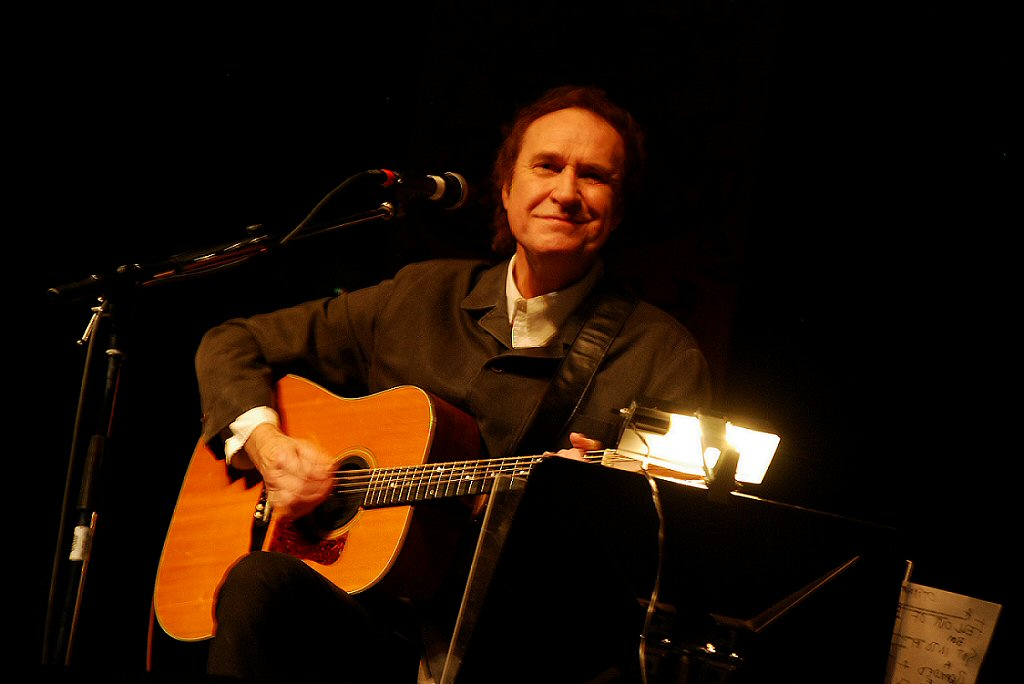
Davies at Bluesfest 2008 in Ottawa

A choral album, The Kinks Choral Collection, on which Davies had been collaborating with the Crouch End Festival Chorus since 2007, was released in the UK in June 2009 and in the US in November 2009. The album was re-released as a special extended edition including Davies's charity Christmas single "Postcard From London" featuring Davies's former girlfriend and leader of the Pretenders, Chrissie Hynde. The video for the single was directed by Julien Temple and features London landmarks including Waterloo Bridge, Carnaby Street, the statue of Eros steps and the Charlie Chaplin statue in Leicester Square. The duet was originally recorded with Kate Nash. His first choice had been Dame Vera Lynn.

In October 2009, Davies performed "All Day and All of the Night" with Metallica at the 25th Anniversary Rock & Roll Hall of Fame Concert.

Davies was a judge for the 3rd (in 2004) and 7th (in 2008) annual Independent Music Awards to support independent artists' careers.

Davies played at Glastonbury Festival in 2010, where he dedicated several songs to the Kinks' bassist Pete Quaife, who died a few days before the festival.

A collaborations album, See My Friends, was released in November 2010 with a US release to follow in early 2011.

2011 also marked Davies's return to New Orleans, Louisiana, to play the Voodoo Experience Music festival. His setlist included material by the Kinks and solo material. That autumn, he toured with the 88 as his backing band. In August 2012, Davies performed "Waterloo Sunset" as part of the closing ceremony of the London 2012 Summer Olympics, watched by over 24 million viewers in the UK; the song was subsequently cut by NBC from the US broadcast, in favour of a preview of its upcoming show Animal Practice.

In 2015 Ray joined his brother Dave for an encore at London's Islington Assembly Hall. The two performed "You Really Got Me", marking the first time in nearly 20 years that the brothers had appeared and performed together.

In 2017 Davies released the album Americana. Based on his experiences in the US it follows on from the short DVD Americana — a work in progress (found on the deluxe CD Working Man's Cafe from 2007), and his biographical book Americana from 2013. A second volume Our Country: Americana Act II was released in June 2018. For his backing band on Americana Davies chose The Jayhawks, an alt-country/country-rock band from Minnesota.

Davies was knighted in the 2017 New Year Honours for services to the arts.

In 2026, Ray and Dave teamed up with painter Christian Furr, for The Brothers exhibition held at the Gibson Garage in London, from 24 July. Furr reimagined the 1968 "magic moment" when the brothers crammed into an East Finchley photo booth, for their iconic makeshift photo shoot.

== Musicals ==
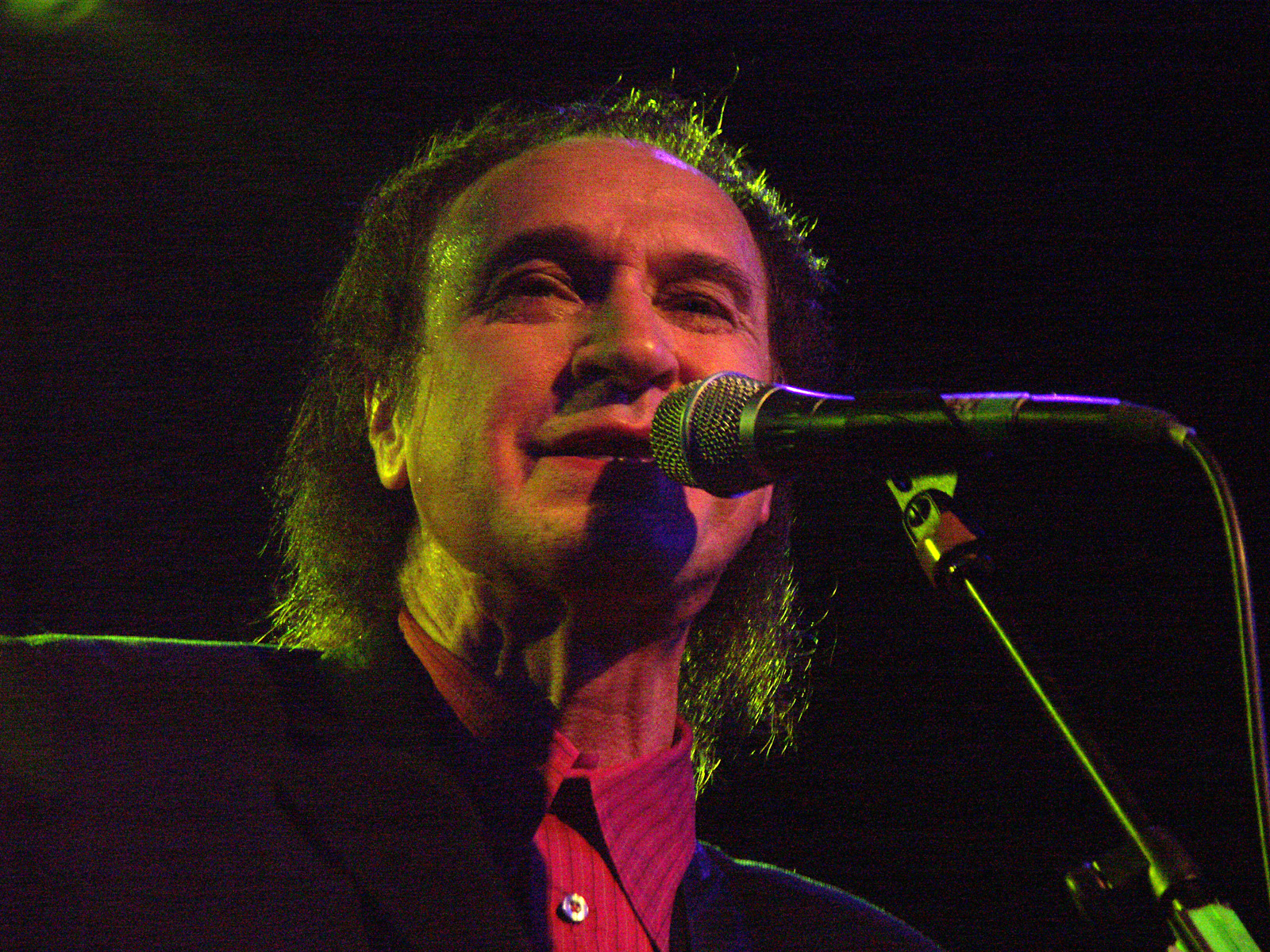
Davies "Other People's Lives" tour Commodore Ballroom, Vancouver, BC 2006

In 1981, Davies collaborated with Barrie Keeffe in writing his first stage musical, Chorus Girls, which opened at the Theatre Royal Stratford East, London, starring Marc Sinden, and had a supporting cast of Michael Elphick, Anita Dobson, Lesley Manville, Kate Williams and Charlotte Cornwell. It was directed by Adrian Shergold, the choreography was by Charles Augins, and Jim Rodford played bass as part of the theatre's "house band".

Davies wrote songs for a musical version of Jules Verne's Around the World in 80 Days; the show, 80 Days, had a book by playwright Snoo Wilson. It was directed by Des McAnuff and ran at the La Jolla Playhouse's Mandell Weiss Theatre in San Diego from 23 August to 9 October 1988. The musical received mixed responses from the critics. Davies's multi-faceted music, McAnuff's directing, and the acting, however, were well received, with the show winning the "Best Musical" award from the San Diego Theatre Critics Circle.

Davies's musical Come Dancing, based partly on his 1983 hit single with 20 new songs, ran at the Theatre Royal Stratford East, London in September–November 2008.

Sunny Afternoon, a musical based on Ray Davies's early life and featuring Kinks songs, opened to critical acclaim at Hampstead Theatre. The musical moved to the Harold Pinter Theatre in London's West End in October 2014. The musical won four awards at the 2015 Olivier Awards, including one for Ray Davies: the Autograph Sound Award for Outstanding Achievement in Music . Sunny Afternoon made its North American debut in March 2025 at Chicago Shakespeare Theater.

== Awards ==
- 1990: the Kinks were the third British band (along with the Who) to be inducted into the Rock and Roll Hall of Fame. At the induction (performed by Pete Townshend), Davies was described as "almost indisputably rock's most literate, witty and insightful songwriter". The members inducted were Avory, the Davies brothers and Quaife.
- 1999: "You Really Got Me" was inducted into the Grammy Hall of Fame.
- 2004: Commander of the Order of the British Empire (CBE) for services to Music in the New Year Honours.
- 2004: Mojo Songwriter Award, which recognises "an artist whose career has been defined by his ability to pen classic material on a consistent basis."
- In 2005, the Kinks were inducted into the UK Music Hall of Fame.
- 2006: BMI Icon Award for his "enduring influence on generations of music makers" at the 2006 annual BMI London Awards.
- 2009: The Mobius Best Off-West End Production in the UK for the musical Come Dancing.
- 2010: Outstanding Achievement Award at the GQ Men of the Year Awards.
- 2010: Lifetime Achievement Award at his AVO Session concert in Basel; the concert was televised internationally.
- 2014: Davies was inducted into the American Songwriters Hall of Fame.
- 2015: Olivier Award for Outstanding Musical Achievement for his West End musical Sunny Afternoon, which garnered 3 additional Olivier's.
- 2015: Davies was voted 27th-greatest songwriter of all time by Rolling Stone magazine in its "100 Greatest Songwriters of All Time" list.
- 2016: BASCA Gold Badge award for his unique contribution to music.
- Davies was knighted in the 2017 New Year Honours for services to the arts.

== Personal life ==
Davies has been married three times and has four daughters. In 1964, he married Rasa Didzpetris. The couple had two daughters. He changed his name by deed poll to Raymond Douglas for five years, which allowed him anonymity for his second marriage in 1974 to Yvonne Gunner. The couple had no children and divorced in 1981. In the early 1980s, Davies had a relationship with Chrissie Hynde of the Pretenders. The couple had a daughter. His third marriage was to Irish ballet dancer Patricia Crosbie, with whom he had a daughter.

In January 2004, Davies was shot in the leg while chasing thieves who had snatched his companion's purse as they walked through the French Quarter of New Orleans. A man was arrested, but the charges were dropped because Davies had already returned to London and did not come back to New Orleans for the trial.

In June 2011, Davies's doctor ordered him to stay at home and rest for six months after blood clots were discovered in his lungs.

== Solo discography ==
=== Studio albums ===
List of studio albums, with chart positions
Year	Title	Peak chart positions					Certification
Year	Title	UK	GER	NED	SWE	US	Certification
1985	Return to Waterloo	—	—	—	—	—	
1998	The Storyteller	105	—	—	—	—	
2006	Other People's Lives	36	48	70	33	122	
2007	Working Man's Café	179	—	—	46	140	
2009	The Kinks Choral Collection (with the Crouch End Festival Chorus)	28	—	96	—	—	
2010	See My Friends	12	50	54	—	—	BPI: Silver
2017	Americana	15	26	18	21	79	
2018	Our Country: Americana Act II	58	56	63	41	—	
"—" denotes album did not chart in that territory.

=== Compilation albums ===
- Collected (2009)
- Waterloo Sunset — The Very Best of The Kinks and Ray Davies (2012) (UK No. 14)

=== Chart singles written by Davies ===
The following is a list of Davies compositions that were chart hits for artists other than the Kinks i.e. covers. Some were originally hits for the Kinks themselves. (See The Kinks discography for hits by the Kinks.)

Year	Title	Artist	Chart positions		
Year	Title	Artist	UK Singles Chart	Canada	US Hot 100
1965	"This Strange Effect"	Dave Berry	37		
1965	"Something Better Beginning"	The Honeycombs	39		
1966	"A House in the Country"	The Pretty Things	50		
1966	"Dandy"	Herman's Hermits		1	5
1978	"You Really Got Me"	Van Halen		49	36
1978	"David Watts"	The Jam	25		
1979	"Stop Your Sobbing"	The Pretenders	34		65
1981	"I Go to Sleep"	The Pretenders	7		
1988	"All Day and All of the Night"	The Stranglers	7		
1988	"Victoria"	The Fall	35		
1989	"Days"	Kirsty MacColl	12		
1997	"Waterloo Sunset"	Cathy Dennis	11		
2007	"The Village Green Preservation Society"	Kate Rusby	102		
