= Working Man's Café =

Studio album by Ray Davies
- Released: 22 October 2007 (UK); 19 February 2008 (USA)
- Studios: Room & Board Recording, Nashville, Tennessee
- Genre: Rock
- Length: 40:58
- Label: V2
- Producers: Ray Davies, Ray Kennedy

Ray Davies chronology
Other People's Lives (2006)	Working Man's Café (2007)	The Kinks Choral Collection (2009)

Working Man's Café is the fourth studio album by English singer-songwriter Ray Davies released on 22 October 2007 in the UK.

The cafe pictured in the artwork is Lane Cafe, located within walking distance of Konk Studios.

== Release ==
The day before the UK release, on 21 October, a ten track promotional copy of the album (without bonus tracks) was "given away" with the Sunday Times newspaper in the UK.

The album was released in the US on New West/Ammal Records on 19 February 2008. The American Limited Edition also contained a separate DVD with a twenty-minute short film named Americana: A Work in Progress, filmed and directed by Ray Davies, featuring footage from the Storyteller tour that took place in the autumn of 2001.

Professional ratings
Review scores
Source	Rating
Allmusic	link
Paste Magazine	link

== Track listing ==
All tracks are written by Ray Davies.

No.	Title	Length
1.	"Vietnam Cowboys"	4:13
2.	"You're Asking Me"	3:22
3.	"Working Man's Café"	3:44
4.	"Morphine Song"	4:18
5.	"In a Moment"	4:29
6.	"Peace In Our Time"	4:37
7.	"No One Listen"	3:11
8.	"Imaginary Man"	4:10
9.	"One More Time"	4:29
10.	"The Voodoo Walk"	4:25
Total length:		40:58

Bonus tracks
No.	Title	Length
11.	"Hymn for a New Age"	3:42
12.	"The Real World"	5:05
Total length:		49:45

Additional bonus tracks on the US edition
No.	Title	Length
13.	"Angola (Wrong Side of the Law)"	4:29
14.	"Vietnam Cowboys" (Demo)	2:52
15.	"The Voodoo Walk" (Demo)	4:25
Total length:		61:31

Additional bonus tracks on the US Limited Edition
No.	Title	Length
13.	"Angola (Wrong Side of the Law)"	4:29
14.	"I, The Victim" (Rough Mix)	4:33
15.	"Vietnam Cowboys" (Demo)	2:52
16.	"The Voodoo Walk" (Demo)	4:25
Total length:		66:04

== Personnel ==
- Ray Davies - lead vocals, acoustic guitar, keyboards, background vocals
- Patrick Buchanan - electric guitar
- Ray Kennedy - additional electric guitar, percussion
- Craig Young - bass
- Tim Lauer - keyboards
- Shannon Otis Forrest - drums
- Karin Forsman, Ray Kennedy - background vocals
- Mick Avory - percussion on "You're Asking Me"
- Nick Payne - tenor and baritone saxophone on "Morphine Song"
- Mike Cotton - trumpet on "Morphine Song"
- Simon Edwards - bass on "One More Time"
- Martyn Baker - drums on "One More Time"
- Bill Lloyd - electric guitar on "The Real World"

Technical

- Rob Crane - design
- Chris Clunn - photography
