= Robert Hugill =

British composer & journalist (born 1955)

Robert Hugill (born 1955) is a British composer, journalist and blogger. He runs classical music blog "Planet Hugill".

== Opera ==
The Genesis of Frankenstein (setting a libretto by the composer based on Mary Shelley's Frankenstein) was premiered by the Helios Collective at the CLF Art Cafe, Peckham on 28 October 2015, directed by Ella Marchment, choreography by Sarah-Louise Kristiansen, musical director Noah Mosley.

When a Man Knows (setting a libretto by the composer based on Alan Richardson's play of the same name) was premiered at the Bridewell Theatre, London on 31 March 2011

== Other compositions ==
Three pieces from the Book of Common Prayer for viola and piano was premiered by Rosalind Ventris (viola) and James Willshire (piano) at Cheltenham Cheltenham Contemporary Concerts in Dean Close School, Cheltenham on 11 Feb 2018.

The motet Dominus Illuminatio mea was premiered on 8 December 2016 at Priory Church of the Order of St John, St John's Square, Clerkenwell Road, London, EC1V 4JJ, by London Concord Singers as part of their 50th-anniversary concert.

The pair of cantatas Out of the Shadows and Et expecto resurrectionem were premiered on 3 February 2023 at Hyde Street Methodist Church in London.

Chapelle du roi premiered the motet Videte Miraculum at St John's Smith Square on 19 December 2009.

== Recordings ==
The album Quickening: Songs by Robert Hugill to English and Welsh poets, released in September 2017 on the Navona Records label, is Hugill's settings of poems by Rowan Williams, Ivor Gurney, A. E. Housman and Christina Rossetti performed by Anna Huntley (mezzo-soprano), Johnny Herford (baritone), Rosalind Ventris (viola) and Will Vann (piano). In reviewing the album for Music-Web International, Rob Barnet referred to Hugill's "candid gift for gracious melody".

Hugill's songs also feature on the disc Sappho, Shropshire and Supertramp, released in 2018 on the Divine Art label. The disc features songs by English composers associated with the English Poetry and Song Society performed by Sarah Leonard (mezzo-soprano), Johnny Herford (baritone) and Nigel Foster (piano). Hugill's songs on the disc include settings of Hart Crane and Rabindranath Tagore.

Hugill's motet, Populos Sion, is on Harmonia Sacra's album Lux Memoriaque on the Nimbus Alliance label.
