= The Kinks Choral Collection =

Studio album by Ray Davies and the Crouch End Festival Chorus
- Released: 15 June 2009
- Genre: Choral music; rock; pop
- Length: 52:56
- Label: Decca
- Producer: Ray Davies

Ray Davies chronology
Working Man's Café (2007)	The Kinks Choral Collection (2009)	See My Friends (2010)

Professional ratings
Review scores
Source	Rating
Allmusic	2.5/5 stars
Rolling Stone	3/5 stars

The Kinks Choral Collection is an album, released 15 June 2009 in the UK and 10 November 2009 in the US, by Ray Davies and the Crouch End Festival Chorus. The album features new studio recordings of Ray Davies' compositions, all but one of which were originally recorded by his band The Kinks.

The collection begins with versions of seven Kinks singles including some of the less well-known singles (including the non-charting "Shangri-La" and "Celluloid Heroes") as well as some of their most successful (including "You Really Got Me" and "Waterloo Sunset"). It then features a version of the title track from Davies' 2007 solo album Working Man's Café, versions of six album tracks from The Kinks' 1968 album The Kinks Are the Village Green Preservation Society and closes with a version of another well-known Kinks single "All Day and All of the Night".

The album entered the UK albums chart at #28 which was its peak position.

It was re-released in the UK on 7 December 2009 as a special edition featuring Ray's Christmas single "Postcard from London", featuring Chrissie Hynde.

== Track listing ==
All tracks are written by Ray Davies.

No.	Title	Length
1.	"Days"	3:43
2.	"Waterloo Sunset"	3:38
3.	"You Really Got Me"	3:03
4.	"Victoria"	3:41
5.	"See My Friends"	3:40
6.	"Celluloid Heroes"	5:21
7.	"Shangri-La"	5:29
8.	"Working Man's Café"	4:00
9.	"Village Green"	3:24
10.	"Picture Book"	2:32
11.	"Big Sky"	3:14
12.	"Do You Remember Walter?"	3:35
13.	"Johnny Thunder"	2:19
14.	"Village Green Preservation Society"	2:33
15.	"All Day and All of the Night"	2:44
Total length:		52:56

Extended Special Edition
No.	Title	Length
1.	"Postcard from London"	3:52
Total length:		56:48
