= List of the Pretenders band members =

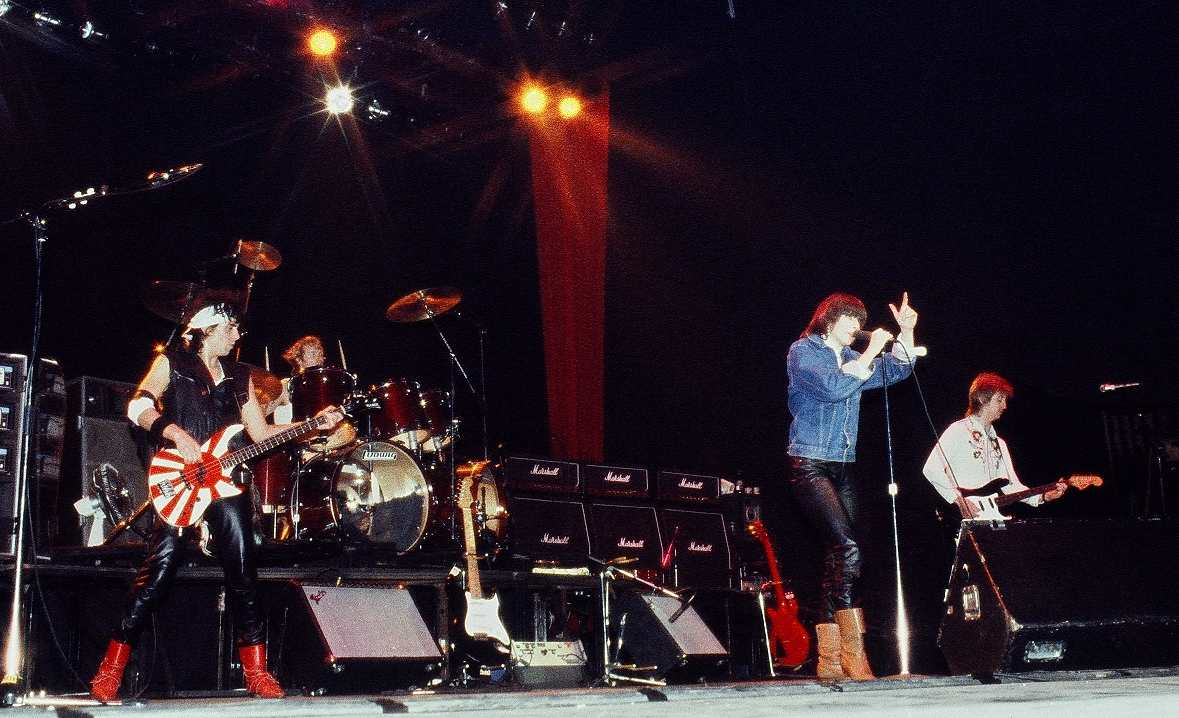
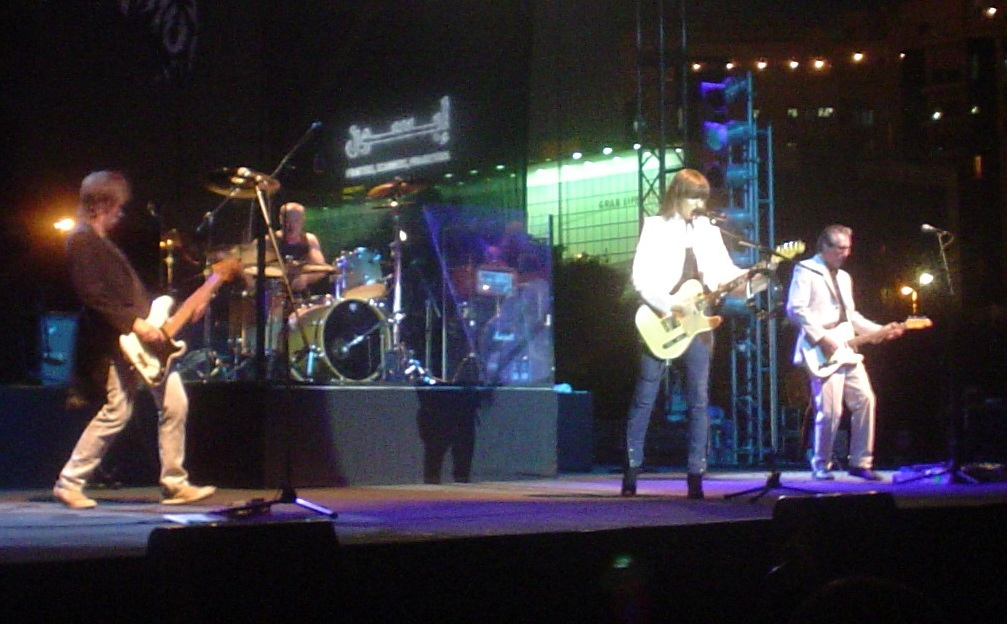
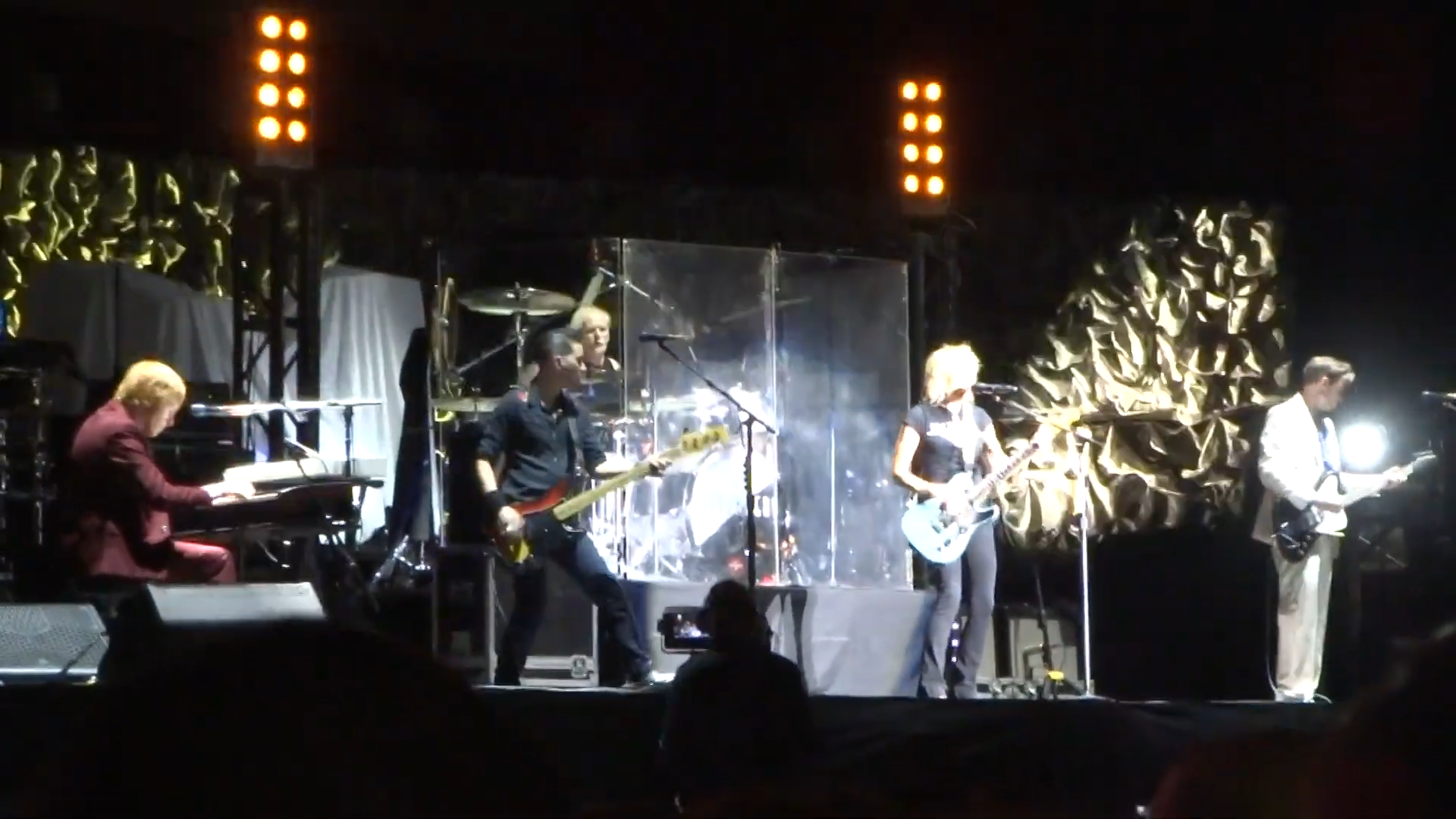
Three line-ups of The Pretenders performing in 1981, 2007 and 2018

The Pretenders are a British-American rock band from Hereford. Formed in 1978, the group originally consisted of vocalist and rhythm guitarist Chrissie Hynde, lead guitarist and keyboardist James Honeyman-Scott, bassist Pete Farndon, and drummer Martin Chambers. The band's current lineup includes Hynde and Chambers alongside bassist Nick Wilkinson (since 2005), lead guitarist James Walbourne, pedal steel guitarist Eric Heywood (both since 2008) and keyboardist Carwyn Ellis (since 2017).

== History ==
The Pretenders were formed in the spring of 1978 by Chrissie Hynde, James Honeyman-Scott, Pete Farndon and Martin Chambers. After the release of Pretenders in 1980 and Pretenders II in 1981, Farndon was fired from the band on 14 June 1982 due to increasing problems with drug abuse, which had led to Honeyman-Scott claiming he would leave if the bassist was not dismissed. Only two days later, however, Honeyman-Scott died as a result of heart failure brought on by a cocaine overdose. Farndon himself would die by drowning in his bathtub after overdosing on heroin a year later. On 20 July, Hynde and Chambers began recording the single "Back on the Chain Gang", written in tribute to Honeyman-Scott, with session musicians Billy Bremner (lead guitar), Robbie McIntosh (rhythm guitar) and Tony Butler (bass). The single was released in October, and later featured on the 1984 album Learning to Crawl.

In February 1983, the Pretenders returned with McIntosh and bassist Malcolm Foster. Learning to Crawl was released in 1984, after which the band remained largely inactive for a year (save for an appearance at Live Aid) as Hynde married Simple Minds frontman Jim Kerr and gave birth to daughter Yasmin. The group returned in early 1986 to record Get Close, but shortly after sessions began Chambers was fired by Hynde due to a deterioration in his drumming ability, which also led to Foster leaving. Chambers and Foster were replaced by Blair Cunningham and T. M. Stevens, respectively, who completed the album's recording and remained for its 1987 tour (keyboardist Bernie Worrell also joined at the same time). Shortly after beginning the tour, however, Hynde dismissed Stevens and Worrell and brought back Rupert Black (who had toured since Learning to Crawl) and Foster, who remained for the rest of the year. Johnny Marr replaced McIntosh in late 1987, before the band went on hiatus.

Hynde returned in 1990 with Packed!, which was credited to the Pretenders only to fulfil a contractual obligation – Hynde was the only credited band member on the album, although Cunningham performed drums on all eleven tracks. In 1993 the band contributed a Jimi Hendrix cover of Bold As Love for the Hendrix tribute album Stone Free. A new full lineup of the band was formed in 1993 when Hynde enlisted guitarist Adam Seymour and, later, bassist Andy Hobson and returning drummer Chambers for Last of the Independents, released in 1994. Zeben Jameson was added as touring keyboardist, and this lineup of the Pretenders remained constant for more than ten years. Hobson was replaced by Nick Wilkinson in 2005, and in 2008 Seymour was replaced by James Walbourne and pedal steel guitarist Eric Heywood, both of whom first featured on Break Up the Concrete.

In 2023, the band toured with a line-up of Hynde, Walbourne, and Drummer Kris Sonne.

== Members ==
=== Current ===
Image	Name	Years active	Instruments	Release contributions
	Chrissie Hynde	1978–present	lead and backing vocals; rhythm guitar; harmonica	all The Pretenders releases
	James Walbourne	2008–present	lead guitar; keyboards; backing vocals	all releases from Break Up the Concrete (2008) onwards except Alone (2016)
	Kris Sonne	2023–present	drums; percussion; backing vocals	Relentless (2023)

=== Former ===
Image	Name	Years active	Instruments	Release contributions
	Martin Chambers	1978–1986; 1993–2023	drums; percussion; backing and occasional lead vocals	all the Pretenders releases except Packed! (1990), Break Up the Concrete (2008), Alone (2016), and Relentless (2023)
	James Honeyman-Scott	1978–1982 (until his death)	lead guitar; keyboards; backing vocals	Pretenders (1980); Extended Play (1981); Pretenders II (1981)
	Pete Farndon	1978–1982 (died 1983)	bass; backing vocals	Pretenders (1980); Extended Play (1981); Pretenders II (1981)
	Robbie McIntosh	1982–1987	lead guitar; backing vocals	Learning to Crawl (1984); Get Close (1986); Last of the Independents (1994) – one track only
	Malcolm Foster	1982–1986; 1987	bass; backing vocals	Learning to Crawl (1984); Get Close (1986) – one track only
	Blair Cunningham	1986–1993	drums; backing vocals; occasional percussion	Get Close (1986); Packed! (1990)
	T. M. Stevens	1986–1987 (died 2024)	bass	Get Close (1986)
	Johnny Marr	1987	lead guitar	"The Windows of the World" (1988)
	Adam Seymour	1993–2008	lead guitar; keyboards; backing vocals	all the Pretenders releases from Last of the Independents (1994) to Loose in L.A. (2003)
	Andy Hobson	1993–2005	bass; backing vocals	all the Pretenders releases from Last of the Independents (1994) to Loose in L.A. (2003)
	Nick Wilkinson	2005–2023	bass; backing vocals	all releases from Break Up the Concrete (2008) to Hate for Sale (2020)
	Eric Heywood	2008–2023	pedal steel guitar; backing vocals	all releases from Break Up the Concrete (2008) to Hate for Sale (2020)
	Carwyn Ellis	2022–2023 (touring 2012, 2017–2021)	keyboards; acoustic guitar; backing vocals	Relentless (2023)

=== Touring ===
Image	Name	Years active	Instruments	Details
	Chris Thomas	1983	keyboards	After producing the band's debut album, Thomas played keyboards at both 1983 Pretenders shows.
	Rupert Black	1984–1986; 1987	keyboards	Black took over from Thomas after the release of Learning to Crawl from 1984, remaining until 1986.
	Bernie Worrell	1987 (died 2016)	keyboards	Worrell performed on Get Close and became a part of the Pretenders touring lineup for subsequent shows.
	Zeben Jameson	1994–2006	keyboards; percussion; backing vocals	Jameson was the Pretenders' touring keyboardist from their reformation in 1994 to his departure in 2006.

=== Session ===
Image	Name	Years active	Instruments	Release contributions
	Geoff Bryant	1978–1979; 1980–1981	French horn	Pretenders (1979); Pretenders II (1981)
	Henry Lowther	1978–1979; 1980–1981	trumpet	Pretenders (1979); Pretenders II (1981)
	Jim Wilson	1978–1979; 1980–1981	trumpet	Pretenders (1979); Pretenders II (1981)
	Chris Mercer	1978–1979; 1980–1981	saxophone	Pretenders (1979); Pretenders II (1981)
	Fred Berk	1978–1979	bass guitar	Pretenders (1979)
	Gerry Mackelduff	1978–1979	drums	Pretenders (1979)
	Nigel Pegrum	1978–1979	drums	Pretenders (1979)
	Billy Bremner	1982–1983; 1990	lead and rhythm guitar; backing vocals	Learning to Crawl (1984); Packed! (1990)
	Tony Butler	1982–1983	bass guitar	Learning to Crawl (1984)
	Paul Carrack	1982–1983	piano; backing vocals	Learning to Crawl (1984)
	Andrew Bodnar	1982–1983	bass guitar; backing vocals	Learning to Crawl (1984)
	John McKenzie	1986; 1990	bass guitar; backing vocals	Get Close (1986); Packed! (1990)
	Chucho Merchán	1986	bass	Get Close (1986)
	Bruce Thomas	1986	bass	Get Close (1986)
	Malcolm Foster	1986	bass	Get Close (1986)
	Carlos Alomar	1986	percussion	Get Close (1986)
	Bruce Brody	1986	organ	Get Close (1986)
	Mel Gaynor	1986	drums	Get Close (1986)
	Simon Phillips	1986	drums	Get Close (1986)
	Steve Jordan	1986	drums; percussion	Get Close (1986)
	Tommy Mandel	1986	synthesizer	Get Close (1986)
	Patrick Seymour	1986	synthesizer	Get Close (1986)
	Paul Wickens	1986	synthesizer; piano	Get Close (1986)
	L. Shankar	1986	violin	Get Close (1986)
	Tchad Blake	1990	guitar	Packed! (1990)
	David Rhodes	1990	guitar	Packed! (1990)
	Mitchell Froom	1990	keyboards	Packed! (1990)
	Dominic Miller	1990	guitar; bass guitar; backing vocals	Packed! (1990)
	Will MacGregor	1990	bass guitar; backing vocals	Packed! (1990)
	Tony "Gad" Robinson	1990	bass guitar; backing vocals	Packed! (1990)
	Duane Delano Verh	1990	bass guitar	Packed! (1990)
	Tim Finn	1990	backing vocals	Packed! (1990)
	Mark Hart	1990	backing vocals	Packed! (1990)
	Teo Miller	1990	backing vocals	Packed! (1990)
	Adey Wilson	1990	backing vocals	Packed! (1990)
	Tom Kelly	1994; 1999; 2001–2002	bass guitar; piano; guitar; backing vocals	Last of the Independents (1994); ¡Viva El Amor! (1999); Loose Screw (2002)
	Ian Stanley	1994	organ; special effects; keyboards	Last of the Independents (1994)
	J.F.T. Hood	1994	drums; special effects	Last of the Independents (1994)
	Jim Copley	1994	drums	Last of the Independents (1994)
	Andy Rourke	1994	bass guitar	Last of the Independents (1994)
	David Paton	1994	bass guitar	Last of the Independents (1994)
	London Gospel Choir	1994	choir	Last of the Independents (1994)
	David Lord	1994	string arrangement	Last of the Independents (1994)
	Jeff Beck	1999	guitar	¡Viva El Amor! (1999)
	David Johansen	1999	vocals	¡Viva El Amor! (1999)
	Andy Duncan	1999	percussion; programming	¡Viva El Amor! (1999)
	Stephen Hague	1999	keyboards; accordion	¡Viva El Amor! (1999)
	Chuck Norman	1999	keyboards; programming; percussion	¡Viva El Amor! (1999)
	Lindsay Edwards	1999	keyboards	¡Viva El Amor! (1999)
	Preston Heyman	1999	percussion	¡Viva El Amor! (1999)
	Jules Shear	1999	backing vocals	¡Viva El Amor! (1999)
	John Metcalfe	1999	string arrangements; viola	¡Viva El Amor! (1999)
	Louisa Fuller	1999	violin	¡Viva El Amor! (1999)
	Richard Koster	1999	violin	¡Viva El Amor! (1999)
	Ivan McCready	1999	cello	¡Viva El Amor! (1999)
	Kevin Bacon	2001–2002	bass	Loose Screw (2002)
	Jonathan Quarmby	2001–2002	keyboards	Loose Screw (2002)
	Colin Elliot	2001–2002	percussion	Loose Screw (2002)
	Mark "Wiff" Smith	2001–2002	percussion	Loose Screw (2002)
	Priscilla Jones	2001–2002	backing vocals	Loose Screw (2002)
	Mark Sheridan	2001–2002	backing vocals	Loose Screw (2002)
	The Duke Quartet	2001–2002	strings; brass	Loose Screw (2002)
	Kick Horns	2001–2002	brass	Loose Screw (2002)
	Jim Keltner	2008	drums; backing vocals	Break Up the Concrete (2008)
	Dan Auerbach	2016	guitar; keyboards; backing vocals	Alone (2016)
	Duane Eddy	2016	guitar	Alone (2016)
	Kenny Vaughan	2016	guitar	Alone (2016)
	Russ Pahl	2016	pedal steel	Alone (2016)
	Dave Roe	2016	upright bass	Alone (2016)
	Leon Michels	2016	keyboards	Alone (2016)
	Richard Swift	2016	drums; guitar; keyboards; backing vocals	Alone (2016)

== Lineups ==
Period	Members	Releases
Spring 1978 – June 1982	Chrissie Hynde – lead vocals, rhythm guitar; James Honeyman-Scott – lead guitar, keyboards, backing vocals; Pete Farndon – bass, backing vocals; Martin Chambers – drums, percussion, backing vocals	Pretenders (1979); Extended Play (1981); Pretenders II (1981)
June 1982 – February 1983	Chrissie Hynde – lead vocals, guitar; Martin Chambers – drums, percussion, backing vocals; Billy Bremner – lead guitar (session member); Robbie McIntosh – rhythm guitar (session member); Tony Butler – bass, backing vocals (session member)	"Back on the Chain Gang" (1982)
February 1983 – summer 1986	Chrissie Hynde – lead vocals, rhythm guitar; Robbie McIntosh – lead guitar, backing vocals; Malcolm Foster – bass, backing vocals; Martin Chambers – drums, percussion, backing vocals; Chris Thomas – keyboards (1983 touring member); Rupert Black – keyboards (1984–1986 touring member)	Learning to Crawl (1984); Get Close (1986) – one track only
Summer 1986 – early 1987	Chrissie Hynde – lead vocals, rhythm guitar; Robbie McIntosh – lead guitar, backing vocals; T. M. Stevens – bass; Blair Cunningham – drums, percussion, backing vocals; Bernie Worrell – keyboards (1987 touring member)	Get Close (1987) – remaining tracks
Early – fall 1987	Chrissie Hynde – lead vocals, rhythm guitar; Robbie McIntosh – lead guitar, backing vocals; Malcolm Foster – bass, backing vocals; Blair Cunningham – drums, percussion, backing vocals; Rupert Black – keyboards (touring member)	none
Late 1987	Chrissie Hynde – lead vocals, rhythm guitar; Johnny Marr – lead guitar; Malcolm Foster – bass, backing vocals; Blair Cunningham – drums, percussion, backing vocals; Rupert Black – keyboards (touring member)	none
Late 1987 – late 1993	Chrissie Hynde – lead vocals, guitar; Blair Cunningham – drums, percussion, backing vocals	Packed! (1990)
Late 1993 – early 2005	Chrissie Hynde – lead vocals, rhythm guitar; Adam Seymour – lead guitar, keyboards, backing vocals; Andy Hobson – bass, backing vocals; Martin Chambers – drums, percussion, backing vocals; Zeben Jameson – keyboards, backing vocals (touring member)	Last of the Independents (1994); The Isle of View (1995); ¡Viva El Amor! (1999); Loose Screw (2002)
Early 2005 – early 2008	Chrissie Hynde – lead vocals, rhythm guitar; Adam Seymour – lead guitar, keyboards, backing vocals; Nick Wilkinson – bass, backing vocals; Martin Chambers – drums, percussion, backing vocals; Zeben Jameson – keyboards, backing vocals (touring member)	none
Early 2008 – present	Chrissie Hynde – lead vocals, rhythm guitar; James Walbourne – lead guitar, keyboards, backing vocals; Nick Wilkinson – bass, backing vocals; Eric Heywood – pedal steel guitar, backing vocals; Martin Chambers – drums, percussion, backing vocals; Carwyn Ellis – keyboards, acoustic guitar (touring member between 2017 and 2021)	Break Up the Concrete (2008); Alone (2016); Hate for Sale (2020); Relentless (2023)
