= The Pretenders discography =

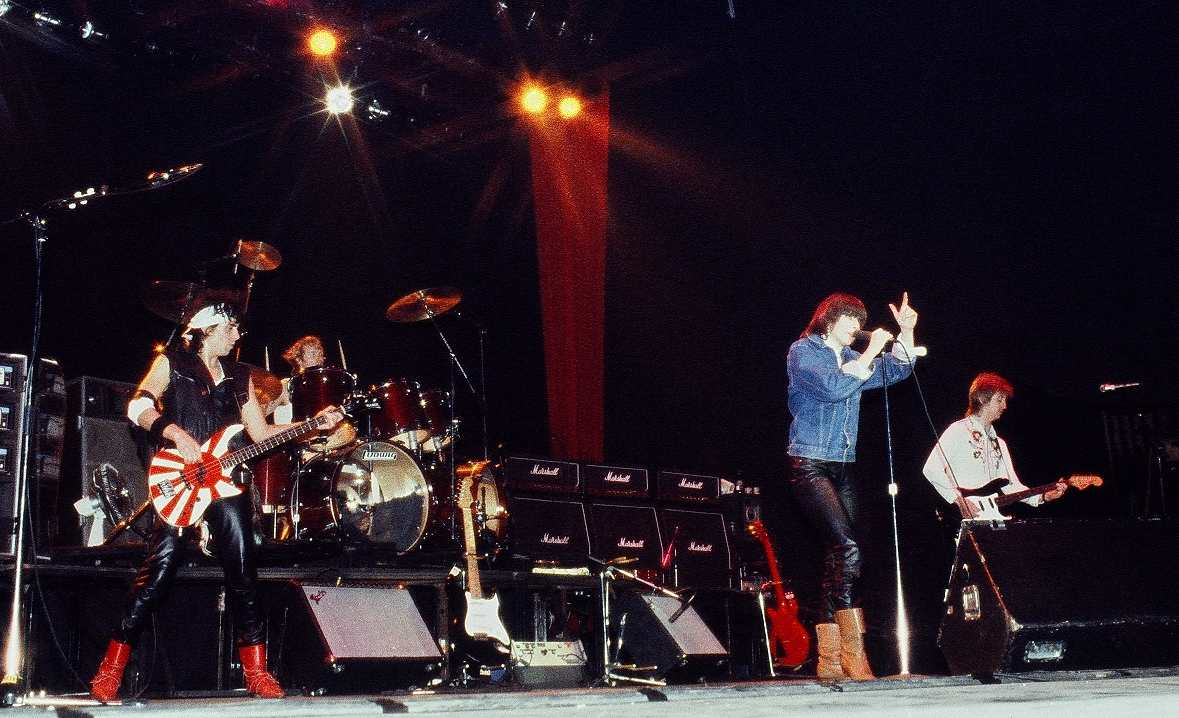
- Pretenders (original line-up), Dominion Theatre, London, December 1981
- Studio albums: 12
- Extended plays: 1
- Live albums: 6
- Compilation albums: 4
- Singles: 55
- Video albums: 6

For over 40 years the discography of The Pretenders, a London, England-based rock band, reflects worldwide charting of 12 studio albums, four compilation albums, one extended play (EP), four live albums, six video albums and 55 singles.

Vocalist/guitarist Chrissie Hynde, guitarist/keyboardist James Honeyman-Scott, bassist Pete Farndon and drummer Martin Chambers formed The Pretenders in 1978. Their chart-topping debut album, Pretenders, is widely regarded as one of the finest debut albums of all time. The Pretenders' hit songs include "Brass in Pocket" (1979), "Talk of the Town" (1980), "Message of Love" (1981), "Back on the Chain Gang" (1982), "Middle of the Road" (1983), "2000 Miles" (1984), "Don't Get Me Wrong" (1986), "My Baby" (1986), and "I'll Stand by You" (1994).

== Albums ==
=== Studio albums ===
Title	Album details	Peak chart positions										Certifications (sales thresholds)
Title	Album details	UK	AUS	CAN	GER	NLD	NOR	NZ	SWE	SWI	US	Certifications (sales thresholds)
Pretenders	Released: 11 January 1980; Label: Sire; Formats: CD, CS, LP	1	6	5	—	14	24	2	2	—	9	BPI: Gold; AUS: Platinum; NVPI: Gold; RIAA: Platinum
Pretenders II	Released: 7 August 1981; Label: Sire; Formats: CD, CS, LP	7	18	9	—	16	—	1	20	—	10	BPI: Silver; RIAA: Gold
Learning to Crawl	Released: 13 January 1984; Label: Sire; Formats: CD, CS, LP	11	18	4	38	11	18	19	3	30	5	BPI: Gold; RIAA: Platinum
Get Close	Released: 20 October 1986; Label: Sire; Formats: CD, LP	6	12	9	33	22	18	13	6	22	25	BPI: Gold; RIAA: Gold
Packed!	Released: 14 May 1990; Label: Sire; Formats: CD, LP	19	55	23	48	43	15	31	7	—	48	BPI: Silver
Last of the Independents	Released: 9 May 1994; Label: Sire; Formats: CD, CS, LP	8	22	25	42	50	16	14	6	26	41	BPI: Gold; RIAA: Gold
¡Viva El Amor!	Released: May 1999; Label: Warner Bros.; Formats: CD, LP	32	—	—	73	—	—	—	36	—	158	
Loose Screw	Released: 12 November 2002; Label: Artemis / Eagle; Formats: CD, LP	55	—	—	—	—	—	—	—	—	179	
Break Up the Concrete	Released: 7 October 2008; Label: Shangri-La Music / Rhino; Formats: CD, LP, digital download	35	—	—	—	—	—	—	58	—	32	BPI: Gold
Alone	Released: 21 October 2016; Label: BMG Rights Management; Formats: CD, LP, digital download	40	—	—	—	—	—	—	—	—	150	
Hate for Sale	Released: 17 July 2020; Label: BMG Rights Management; Formats: CD, LP, digital download, streaming	29	—	—	21	—	—	—	—	11	—	
Relentless	Released: 15 September 2023; Label: Parlophone; Formats: CD, LP, digital download, streaming	25	—	—	43	—	—	—	—	15	—	
"—" denotes releases that did not chart.

Notes;

- Break Up the Concrete was released in Europe only as a double-disc with The Best of Pretenders.

=== Live albums ===
Title	Album details	Peak chart positions				Certifications
Title	Album details	UK	AUS	BEL	US	Certifications
Live at the Santa Monica Civic	Released: 1982; Label: Warner Bros.; Format: LP	—	—	—	—	
Superstar Concert Series	Released: 1988; Label: Westwood One; Format: LP	—	—	—	—	
The Isle of View	Released: 16 October 1995; Label: Warner Bros.; Formats: CD, LP, DVD	23	98	46	100	BPI: Silver
Loose in L.A.	Released: 23 September 2003; Label: Artemis; Format: DVD	—	—	—	—	
Live in London	Released: 16 April 2010; Label: Strobosonic; Formats: CD, DVD, BD	—	—	—	—	
Live in New York City	Released: 2011; Recorded: 1998; Label: Edge J26181; Format: CD, DVD	—	—	—	—	
Kick 'em Where It Hurts	Released: 20 June 2025; Recorded: 2024; Label: Format: vinyl	—	—	—	—	

=== Compilation albums ===
Title	Album details	Peak chart positions						Certifications
Title	Album details	UK	AUS	NZ	SPA	SWE	US	Certifications
The Singles	Released: 26 October 1987; Label: Sire; Formats: CD, CS, LP	6	19	11	48	50	69	BPI: 3× Platinum; RIAA: Gold
Greatest Hits	Released: 18 September 2000; Label: Sire; Formats: CD, LP	21	99	—	—	23	—	BPI: Gold; ARIA: Platinum
Pirate Radio	Released: 14 March 2006; Label: Sire; Formats: CD	—	—	—	—	—	—	
The Best of Pretenders	Released: 1 June 2009; Label: Rhino; Released with Break Up the Concrete; Formats: CD	35	—	—	56	58	—	BPI: Gold
"—" denotes releases that did not chart.

Notes;

- The Best of Pretenders was released as a double disc with Break Up the Concrete in Europe and Brazil in June 2009, titled The Best of / Break Up the Concrete.

== Extended plays ==
Title	EP details	Peak chart positions
Title	EP details	US
Extended Play	Released: 30 March 1981; Label: Sire; Formats: CS, 12-inch	27

== Singles ==
Year	Title	Peak chart positions										Certifications	Album
Year	Title	UK	AUS	CAN	NLD	NZ	SWE	US	US Alt	US Main	US Adult	Certifications	Album
1979	"Stop Your Sobbing"	34	—	—	—	25	—	65	—	—	—		Pretenders
1979	"Kid"	33	90	—	—	—	—	—	—	—	—		Pretenders
1979	"Brass in Pocket"	1	2	5	11	2	1	14	—	—	—	BPI: Gold; RMNZ: 2× Platinum	Pretenders
1980	"Precious"	—	—	—	—	—	—	—	—	—	—		Pretenders
1980	"Talk of the Town"	8	55	—	24	—	—	—	—	—	—		Pretenders II (initially single-only releases)
1981	"Message of Love"	11	15	—	33	—	—	—	—	5	—		Pretenders II (initially single-only releases)
1981	"Day After Day"	45	102	—	—	—	—	—	—	—	—		Pretenders II
1981	"The Adultress" (airplay)	—	—	—	—	—	—	—	—	12	—		Pretenders II
1981	"I Go to Sleep"	7	—	—	9	28	—	—	—	—	—		Pretenders II
1981	"Louie Louie"	—	—	—	—	—	—	110	—	—	—		Pretenders II
1982	"Back on the Chain Gang" b/w "My City Was Gone"	17	11	5	31	14	—	5	—	4; 11	—	RMNZ: Gold	Learning to Crawl
1983	"2000 Miles"	15	30	—	13	36	—	—	—	—	—	BPI: Platinum; RMNZ: Gold	Learning to Crawl
1983	"Middle of the Road"	81	52	12	—	—	—	19	—	2	—		Learning to Crawl
1984	"Time the Avenger" (airplay)	—	—	—	—	—	—	—	—	6	—		Learning to Crawl
1984	"Show Me"	—	—	—	—	—	—	28	—	8	—		Learning to Crawl
1984	"Thumbelina" (airplay)	—	—	—	—	—	—	—	—	57	—		Learning to Crawl
1984	"Thin Line Between Love and Hate"	49	—	—	32	—	—	83	—	—	—		Learning to Crawl
1986	"Don't Get Me Wrong"	10	8	14	25	11	—	10	—	1	28	BPI: Silver; RMNZ: Platinum	Get Close
1986	"Hymn to Her"	8	7	—	38	46	15	—	—	—	—	RMNZ: Gold	Get Close
1987	"My Baby"	84	56	—	—	50	—	64	—	1	—		Get Close
1987	"Room Full of Mirrors" (promo)	—	—	—	—	—	—	—	—	28	—		Get Close
1987	"Where Has Everybody Gone?" (promo)	—	—	—	—	—	—	—	—	26	—		The Living Daylights (soundtrack)
1987	"If There Was a Man"	49	—	—	—	—	—	—	—	—	—		The Living Daylights (soundtrack)
1987	"Kid" (Remix)	—	—	—	—	—	—	—	—	—	—		The Singles
1988	"Windows of the World"	—	117	—	—	—	—	—	21	—	—		1969 (soundtrack)
1990	"Never Do That"	81	107	26	—	—	—	—	4	5	—		Packed!
1990	"Hold a Candle to This" (promo)	—	—	—	—	—	—	—	18	—	—		Packed!
1990	"Sense of Purpose"	—	129	72	—	—	—	—	23	—	—		Packed!
1994	"I'm Not in Love"	—	—	74	—	—	—	—	—	—	—		Indecent Proposal (soundtrack)
1994	"I'll Stand by You"	10	8	12	29	20	21	16	21	—	21	BPI: Gold; RMNZ: Platinum	Last of the Independents
1994	"Night in My Veins"	25	—	9	—	—	—	71	2	13	—		Last of the Independents
1994	"977"	66	—	—	—	—	—	—	—	—	—		Last of the Independents
1994	"Money Talk" (promo)	—	—	—	—	—	—	—	—	—	—		Last of the Independents
1995	"Kid '95" (live)	73	—	—	—	—	—	—	—	—	—		The Isle of View
1995	"2000 Miles" (live)	168	—	—	—	—	—	—	—	—	—		The Isle of View
1997	Fever Pitch The E.P.: "Goin' Back"	65	—	—	—	—	—	—	—	—	—		Fever Pitch (soundtrack)
1999	"Loving You Is All I Know" (promo)	—	—	—	—	—	—	—	—	—	22		The Other Sister (soundtrack)
1999	"Human"	33	—	—	—	17	—	—	—	—	30		¡Viva El Amor!
1999	"Popstar"	97	59	—	—	—	—	—	—	—	—		¡Viva El Amor!
2003	"You Know Who Your Friends Are"	84	—	—	—	—	—	—	—	—	—		Loose Screw
2003	"Time" (Junior Vasquez Remixes)	—	—	—	—	—	—	—	—	—	—		Loose Screw
2003	"Saving Grace"	174	—	—	—	—	—	—	—	—	—		Loose Screw
2003	"The Losing"	—	—	—	—	—	—	—	—	—	—		Loose Screw
2008	"Boots of Chinese Plastic"	—	—	—	—	—	—	—	—	—	6		Break Up the Concrete
2008	"Love's a Mystery"	—	—	—	—	—	—	—	—	—	8		Break Up the Concrete
2008	"Break Up the Concrete"	—	—	—	—	—	—	—	—	—	—		Break Up the Concrete
2016	"Holy Commotion"	—	—	—	—	—	—	—	—	—	5		Alone
2017	"Let's Get Lost"	—	—	—	—	—	—	—	—	—	—		Alone
2017	"Gotta Wait"	—	—	—	—	—	—	—	—	—	—		Alone
2020	"The Buzz"	—	—	—	—	—	—	—	—	—	21		Hate for Sale
2020	"You Can't Hurt a Fool"	—	—	—	—	—	—	—	—	—	—		Hate for Sale
2020	"Hate for Sale"	—	—	—	—	—	—	—	—	—	—		Hate for Sale
2020	"Didn't Want to Be This Lonely"	—	—	—	—	—	—	—	—	—	27		Hate for Sale
2023	"Let the Sun Come In"	—	—	—	—	—	—	—	—	—	—		Relentless
2023	"I Think About You Daily" (featuring Jonny Greenwood)	—	—	—	—	—	—	—	—	—	—		Relentless
2023	"A Love"	—	—	—	—	—	—	—	—	—	—		Relentless
"—" denotes releases that did not chart.

Notes;

- In 1980, "What You Gonna Do About It" (A-side) was released as a single with "Stop Your Sobbing (original demo version)" as the B-side as a special flexipop single in the UK.
- The 1987 "If There Was a Man" UK release was accredited to The Pretenders for 007
- In 1980, "Precious" (A-side) was released as a single in Spain with "Stop Your Sobbing" as the B-side.
- In 1980, "Cuban Slide" (A-side) was released as a single in Japan, backed with "Stop Your Sobbing" as the B-side.
- In 1982 "I Go to Sleep" (A-side) was released in Belgium with "English Roses" (album track) as the B-side.
- In 1987, neither of the two tracks of the promotional single "Kid (Remix) b/w "Stop Your Sobbing (Demo Version)" actually appear on the album in those versions; rather they appear as the original single versions.
- The Pretenders also appear on the UK Singles Chart for their appearance on the 1997 Fever Pitch The EP for which their cover of "Goin' Back" is listed. The EP charted at No. 65 for one week on 10 May 1997.
- The column for US Adult chart positions consists of peak positions from Billboard's Adult Contemporary chart for "Don't Get Me Wrong", "I'll Stand by You" and "Loving You Is All I Know", Billboard's Adult Top 40 chart for "Human" and Adult album alternative (AAA) for "Boots of Chinese Plastic" and "Love's a Mystery". In addition, "I'll Stand by You" also charted on Adult Top 40 chart, but its peak position (#23) was lower than on the Adult Contemporary chart.

== Other appearances ==
Year	Song	Album
1980	"Talk of the Town"	Times Square soundtrack
1981	"The Wait", "Tattooed Love Boys", "Precious"	Concert for Kampuchea soundtrack
1982	"Back on the Chain Gang"	The King of Comedy soundtrack
1982	"In the Sticks"	Attack of the Killer B's compilation album
1984	"Money" (live) (Beatles cover)	Revenge of the Killer B's compilation album
1984	"Show Me" (live)	Greenpeace compilation album
1986	"Don't Get Me Wrong"	Peter's Friends soundtrack
1987	"If There Was a Man", "Where Has Everybody Gone"	The Living Daylights soundtrack
1988	"Windows of the World", "1969" (Bacharach/Osterberg covers)	1969 soundtrack
1991	"Born for a Purpose" (Alimantado cover)	Tame Yourself compilation
1993	"Bold as Love" (Hendrix cover)	Stone Free: A Tribute to Jimi Hendrix
1994	"Forever Young" (Dylan cover)	With Honors soundtrack
1995	"Everyday Is Like Sunday" (Morrissey cover)	Boys on the Side soundtrack
1995	"Forever Young" (Dylan cover)	Free Willy 2: The Adventure Home soundtrack
1997	"Goodbye" (Earle cover), "The Homecoming"	G.I. Jane soundtrack
1999	"I Wish You Love" (cover)	Eye of the Beholder soundtrack
1999	"Message of Love" and various tracks as backing band	Here, There and Everywhere: A Concert for Linda memorial concert
1999	"Loving You Is All I Know" (Diane Warren cover)	The Other Sister soundtrack
2002	"Get Out of London" (Interferon cover)	The Wild Thornberrys soundtrack
2002	"Bless You" (Lennon cover)	Uncut Presents: Instant Karma 2002; a Tribute to John Lennon
2005	"Stop Your Sobbing", "Back on the Chain Gang", "Middle of the Road"	Live Aid Anniversary Box Set. "Time the Avenger" and "Message of Love" also performed but not included.

== DVDs ==
- The Isle of View (1995)
- Loose in L.A. (2003)
- 20 Years Ago Today – Live Aid (2005)
- Live in London (2010)
- Pretenders and Friends (2019)
