= Greatest Hits (Pretenders album) =

Greatest hits album by The Pretenders
- Released: 18 September 2000
- Recorded: 1978–1999
- Genre: New wave; power pop
- Length: 72:52
- Label: Musicrama/Koch

The Pretenders chronology
¡Viva El Amor! (1999)	Greatest Hits (2000)	Loose Screw (2002)

Professional ratings
Review scores
Source	Rating
AllMusic	4/5 stars

Greatest Hits is a greatest hits album by English-American rock band The Pretenders, released in 2000. It was only their second greatest hits album in 22 years, but less successful than its predecessor, The Singles, released in 1987. It contains seven songs not featured on the previous compilation: "Human", "Forever Young", "Night in My Veins", "Spiritual High (State of Independence)", "Breakfast in Bed", "Popstar" and "I'll Stand by You".

The track "Human" is a cover of the 1995 song "Human on the Inside" by Australian rock duo, Divinyls.

== Track listing ==
All tracks are written by Chrissie Hynde, except where noted.

No.	Title	Writer(s)	Original album	Length
1.	"Brass in Pocket"	Hynde; James Honeyman-Scott	Pretenders (1980)	3:06
2.	"Message of Love"		Extended Play and Pretenders II (1981)	3:25
3.	"Don't Get Me Wrong"		Get Close (1986)	3:48
4.	"Kid"		Pretenders	3:04
5.	"Human"	Mark McEntee; Shelly Peiken	¡Viva El Amor! (1999)	3:55
6.	"I Go to Sleep"	Ray Davies	Pretenders II	2:56
7.	"Forever Young"	Bob Dylan	Last of the Independents (1994)	5:04
8.	"I Got You Babe" (UB40 featuring Chrissie Hynde)	Sonny Bono	Baggariddim (1985)	3:11
9.	"Night in My Veins"	Hynde; Tom Kelly; Billy Steinberg	Last of the Independents	3:17
10.	"Spiritual High (State of Independence)" (Moodswings featuring Chrissie Hynde)	Jon Anderson; Vangelis	Moodfood (1992)	4:59
11.	"Talk of the Town" (single version)		Extended Play and Pretenders II	3:13
12.	"Stop Your Sobbing"	Davies	Pretenders	2:38
13.	"Hymn to Her"	Meg Keene	Get Close	4:57
14.	"2000 Miles"		Learning to Crawl (1984)	3:40
15.	"Breakfast in Bed" (UB40 featuring Chrissie Hynde)	Donnie Fritts; Eddie Hinton	UB40 (1988)	3:17
16.	"Popstar"	Hynde; Adam Seymour	¡Viva El Amor!	3:41
17.	"Middle of the Road"		Learning to Crawl	4:13
18.	"Thin Line Between Love and Hate"	Jackie Members; Richard Poindexter; Robert Poindexter	Learning to Crawl	3:41
19.	"Back on the Chain Gang"		Learning to Crawl	3:52
20.	"I'll Stand By You"	Hynde; Kelly; Steinberg	Last of the Independents	3:59

== Charts ==
Chart (2000)	Peak position
Australian Albums (ARIA)	99
Belgian Albums (Ultratop Flanders)	45
Swedish Albums (Sverigetopplistan)	23
UK Albums (Official Charts)	21

== Certifications ==
Region	Certification	Certified units/sales
Argentina (CAPIF)	Gold	30,000^{^}
Australia (ARIA)	Platinum	70,000^{^}
Belgium (BRMA)	Gold	25,000^{*}
New Zealand (RMNZ)	2× Platinum	30,000^{^}
Spain (Promusicae)	Gold	50,000^{^}
United Kingdom (BPI)	Gold	100,000^{^}
^{*} Sales figures based on certification alone.^{^} Shipments figures based on certification alone.
