= The Isle of View =

Live album by the Pretenders
- Released: 16 October 1995
- Recorded: 1 May 1995
- Venue: Jacob Street Studios, London
- Genre: Acoustic
- Length: 58:05
- Label: Warner Bros.; WEA
- Producer: Stephen Street

The Pretenders chronology
Last of the Independents (1994)	The Isle of View (1995)	¡Viva el Amor! (1999)

Professional ratings
Review scores
Source	Rating
AllMusic	2.5/5 stars
Robert Christgau	(neither)
Entertainment Weekly	A
NME	8/10
Rolling Stone	3/5 stars
Trouser Press	(favorable)

The Isle of View is a live acoustic album by rock band the Pretenders, released in 1995. It was recorded in May during a live, televised performance at London's Jacob Street Studios. The Duke Quartet accompanied Chrissie Hynde for much of the performance. The title is a pun (same-sounding phrase or mondegreen) on the words I Love You.

== Track listing ==
All songs written by Chrissie Hynde, except where noted.

1. "Sense of Purpose" – 3:50
2. "Chill Factor" – 4:01
3. "Private Life" – 4:42
4. "Back on the Chain Gang" – 4:17
5. "Kid" – 3:56
6. "I Hurt You" – 4:29
7. "Criminal" – 4:18
8. "Brass in Pocket" (James Honeyman-Scott, Hynde) – 3:23
9. "2000 Miles" – 3:40
10. "Hymn to Her" (Meg Keene) – 3:52
11. "Lovers of Today" – 5:19
12. "The Phone Call" – 2:55
13. "I Go to Sleep" (Ray Davies) – 2:57
14. "Revolution" – 6:28
15. "The Isle of View" – 0:42

== Personnel ==
=== Pretenders ===
- Chrissie Hynde – lead vocals, rhythm guitar
- Adam Seymour – lead guitar, harmonium, backing vocals
- Andy Hobson – bass guitar
- Martin Chambers – drums, backing vocals

=== Additional personnel ===
- Damon Albarn – piano
- The Duke Quartet, whose members at the time were:
  - John Metcalfe – viola
  - Louisa Fuller – violin
  - Richard Koster – violin
  - Ivan McCready – cello
- Mark "Wiff" Smith – percussion

== Charts ==
Chart performance for The Isle of View
Chart (1995)	Peak position
Australian Albums (ARIA)	98
Belgian Albums (Ultratop Flanders)	46
UK Albums (OCC)	23
