= ¡Viva El Amor! =

Studio album by the Pretenders
- Released: May 1999
- Recorded: 1999
- Studio: Townhouse (London); Sarm West (London); RAK (London); Innovation (London); Bearsville (Bearsville, New York)
- Genre: Alternative rock
- Length: 45:05
- Label: Warner Bros.; WEA
- Producer: Stephen Hague; Stephen Street

The Pretenders chronology
The Isle of View (1995)	¡Viva El Amor! (1999)	Greatest Hits (2000)

Professional ratings
Review scores
Source	Rating
AllMusic	3.5/5 stars
BBC	(average)
Los Angeles Times	2.5/4 stars
Melody Maker	4/5 stars
People	(favorable)
Robert Christgau	A−
Rolling Stone	3/5 stars
Trouser Press	(favorable)

¡Viva El Amor! (Spanish for Long Live Love) is the seventh studio album by the rock band the Pretenders, released in 1999. The band's lineup for the album is the same as that credited on 1994's Last of the Independents: Chrissie Hynde (vocals, guitar), Martin Chambers (drums), Andy Hobson (bass) and Adam Seymour (guitar). This time, however, the credited line-up actually plays on most of the album, although Hobson is replaced on bass by session musicians on a few cuts.

The album, featuring a cover photograph of Hynde taken by friend Linda McCartney, saw moderate success in the United States and the United Kingdom. Its two lead singles were "Popstar" and "Human", the latter a Divinyls cover. The Class Mix of "Human" was used as the theme music to the short-lived American TV series Cupid as well as featuring in the soundtrack to the Brenda Blethyn film Saving Grace. The album charted in the UK, US and Sweden.

== Track listing ==
1. "Popstar" (Chrissie Hynde, Adam Seymour) – 3:34
2. "Human" (Shelly Peiken, Mark McEntee) – 3:55
3. "From the Heart Down" (Hynde, Billy Steinberg, Tom Kelly) – 3:31
4. "Nails in the Road" (Hynde, Steinberg, Kelly) – 3:25
5. "Who's Who" (Hynde) – 4:11
6. "Dragway 42" (Hynde) – 5:19
7. "Baby's Breath" (Hynde, Steinberg, Kelly) – 3:15
8. "One More Time" (Hynde) – 3:15
9. "Legalise Me" (Hynde) – 3:51
10. "Samurai" (Hynde) – 4:43
11. "Rabo de Nube" (Silvio Rodríguez) – 1:26
12. "Biker" (Hynde) – 4:40

=== 2015 deluxe special edition ===
The first disc contains the twelve tracks from the original album.

Disc two

B-sides

1. "The Homecoming" (Street Version) (Hynde) – 4:16
2. "Human" (Class Mix) (Peiken, McEntee) – 3:57
3. "The Needle and the Damage Done" (Neil Young) – 3:46
4. "Samurai" (Street Mix) (Hynde) – 5:47

Bonus tracks

5. "Back Down" (Hynde, Bernard Butler) – 4:16
6. "California" (Hynde, Seymour) – 4:32
7. "From the Heart Down" (alternate version) (Hynde, Steinberg, Kelly) – 3:41

Songs for soundtracks

8. "Goin' Back" (from Fever Pitch, 1997) (Gerry Goffin, Carole King) – 4:06
9. "Goodbye" (from G.I. Jane, 1997) (Steve Earle) – 4:34
10. "The Homecoming" (from G.I. Jane) (Hynde) – 4:22

DVD

Promo videos

1. "Human"
2. "Popstar"

BBC TV appearances

3. "From the Heart Down" (Later, May 1999)
4. "Human" (Later, May 1999)
5. "Talk of the Town" (Songwriters' Circle, July 1999)
6. "Kid" (Songwriters' Circle, July 1999)
7. "Back on the Chain Gang" (Songwriters' Circle, July 1999)

== Personnel ==
Adapted from the album's liner notes.

=== The Pretenders ===
- Chrissie Hynde – vocals, guitar (1, 4–10, 12), harmonica (1)
- Adam Seymour – guitar, bass (5), keyboards (10), backing vocals (1)
- Andy Hobson – bass (3, 6, 7, 10, 12)
- Martin Chambers – drums (1–10, 12)

=== Additional personnel ===
- Tom Kelly – bass (1, 2, 4, 8, 9), guitar (11), backing vocals (1, 4)
- Chuck Norman – keyboards (1, 5), programming (5)
- Lindsay Edwards – keyboards (2)
- Stephen Hague – keyboards (9), accordion (11)
- Andy Duncan – percussion (1, 4, 9), programming (5)
- Preston Heyman – percussion (2)
- Jeff Beck – guitar solo (9)
- David Johansen – backing vocals (1), ad libs (1)
- Jules Shear – backing vocals (2, 5)
- The Duke Quartet: (2, 3, 6, 12)
  - Louisa Fuller – violin
  - Richard Koster – violin
  - Ivan McCready – cello
  - John Metcalfe – viola, string arrangements

=== Technical ===
- Stephen Hague – producer (1, 2, 4, 5, 8, 9, 11), mixing (1, 5)
- Stephen Street – producer (3, 6, 7, 10, 12)
- Julie Gardner – engineer
- Richard Norris – engineer, mixing (1, 5)
- David Boucher – engineer
- Doug Wynne – engineer
- Tin Tin Out – remix and additional production for Empire Management (2)
- Rob Dickins – executive producer (2)
- Bob Clearmountain – mixing (4, 6, 8–12)
- Ian Cooper – mastering (at Metropolis Studio, London)
- Linda McCartney – cover photo
- Mary McCartney – inner sleeve photos
- Michael Nash Associates – artwork

=== Deluxe special edition ===
- Stephen Street – producer (1, 3, 4, 8)
- Stephen Hague – producer (2, 7)
- Trevor Horn – producer (9, 10)
- Tim Weidner – engineer, mixing (9, 10)
- Steve Fitzmaurice – engineer (9, 10)
- Tom Elmhirst – engineer (9, 10)

== Charts ==
Chart performance for ¡Viva El Amor!
Chart (1999)	Peak position
German Albums (Offizielle Top 100)	73
Swedish Albums (Sverigetopplistan)	36
UK Albums (OCC)	32
US Billboard 200	158
