= Malcolm Foster =

British musician

Malcolm Foster is a British musician known best for being the bass player for the Pretenders between 1982 and 1987, and a session player for Simple Minds between 1989 and 1995.

== Career ==
=== The Pretenders ===
Foster received an invitation from Chrissie Hynde to join the Pretenders after Hynde dismissed original bassist Pete Farndon. Foster permanently joined in late 1982, and helped the band finish their 1984 album, Learning to Crawl (his only full album with them). Learning to Crawl was the band's commercial rebound after losing James Honeyman-Scott and Pete Farndon, featuring hits such as "Back on the Chain Gang," "Middle of The Road," and their cover of The Persuaders' hit "Thin Line Between Love and Hate".

After the band's 1984–1985 tour, which wrapped up with a show at Live Aid, the Pretenders went in to work on their fourth album, Get Close. Hynde was not satisfied with Martin Chambers' drumming and let him go. During another session, Foster decided to follow Chambers out of the group.

=== Simple Minds ===
Foster joined Simple Minds in 1989, replacing bassist John Giblin. Foster was a session bassist on the albums Street Fighting Years (1989), Real Life (1991), and Good News from the Next World (1995).
