= Brass in Pocket =

1979 single by the Pretenders

- Artwork for vinyl releases in the UK, some European countries, and Australia

Single by The Pretenders

from the album Pretenders
- B-side: "Swinging London"; "Nervous But Shy"
- Released: 9 November 1979
- Genre: New wave; pop
- Length: 3:09
- Label: Real; Sire (US)
- Songwriters: Chrissie Hynde; James Honeyman-Scott
- Producer: Chris Thomas

The Pretenders singles chronology
"Kid" (1979)	"Brass in Pocket" (1979)	"Precious" (1980)

Music video
- "Brass in Pocket" on YouTube

Back cover
- Back sleeve for UK single

"Brass in Pocket", also known as "Brass in Pocket (I'm Special)", is a song by English rock band the Pretenders, released in late 1979 as the third single from their self-titled debut album. It was written by Chrissie Hynde and James Honeyman-Scott, and produced by Chris Thomas. Originating as a guitar lick written by Honeyman-Scott, the song's lyrics were explained by Hynde to be about the cockiness that one needs to effectively perform on stage. The song's title derives from a phrase she overheard after a show.

"Brass in Pocket" became the band's biggest hit in the UK, reaching number one on the UK singles chart (and was the first new number one single of the 1980s) as well as Sweden and Ireland, and reached the top ten in various countries including Australia, Belgium, Canada, South Africa, and New Zealand. It also reached number 14 on the US Billboard Hot 100. Its music video was the seventh video aired on MTV on its launch on 1 August 1981.

== Background ==
"Brass in Pocket" originated as a guitar line that Pretenders guitarist James Honeyman-Scott played for Chrissie Hynde. Hynde then recorded the part and wrote the song's lyrics. Musically, Hynde described "Brass in Pocket" as "trying to be a Motown song, but it didn't quite get it".

Hynde got the idea for the song's title when, during an after-show dinner, she overheard someone enquiring if anyone had "Picked up dry cleaning? Any brass in pocket?" Of the song's reference to "bottle", Hynde explained, "Bottle is Cockney rhyming slang. It means bottle and glass. The way Cockney rhyming slang works is the word you're really saying rhymes with the second word. So bottle and glass rhymes with ass. In England, to say somebody has a lot of ass they have a lot of funk. So you say, 'That guy has a lot of bottle.'" Of the song's meaning, Hynde stated:

The tradition of ["Brass in Pocket"] is that you're supposed to be kind of cocky and sure of yourself. You're not supposed to go on stage and say, "I'm small and I have no confidence and think I'm a shit." Because you just can't do that on stage. You're not supposed to, and probably you don't have much confidence, and you do think you're a little piece of shit or else you wouldn't have gotten a rock band together in the first place.

During an interview with The Observer in 2004, Hynde revealed she was initially reluctant to have the song released: "When we recorded the song I wasn't very happy with it and told my producer that he could release it over my dead body." She later reflected, "Now I like that song because it's one of those songs that served me well. I didn't like my voice on it. I was kind of a new singer, and listening to my voice made me kind of cringe."

== Music and lyrics ==
The lyrics detail the female singer about to have her first sexual encounter with a particular person, with her expressing confidence that the experience will be successful. According to Rolling Stone magazine critic Ken Tucker, the song uses "an iron fist as a metaphor for [Hynde's] sexual clout". The Rolling Stone Album Guide critic J. D. Considine describes the song as "sassy" and credits the band for "putting bounce in each step" of it. Author Simon Reynolds similarly describes Hynde's vocals as "pure sass" and "feline narcissism", noting that she "linger[s] languorously" over the phrase "I'm special".

According to AllMusic critic Steve Huey, the backbeat "meshes very nicely with Hynde's unshakable confidence, and the song never gets aggressive enough to break its charming spell or make her self-assurance seem implausibly idealized." Huey also points out a harmonic shift in the music for the portion of the song where the singer lists the various attractive qualities she will use to make the encounter a success. Ultimate Classic Rock critic Bryan Wawzenek rated it one of drummer Martin Chambers' top 10 Pretenders songs, praising the relaxed groove and saying, "The beat is weighty but soft, and it allows plenty of room for Chrissie Hynde to side-step her way through the single."

Dave Thompson suggests that the song is actually about the Pretenders' first live concert rather than a sexual experience.

Cash Box said the song shows why Hynde was "quickly emerging as one of the bright new singer/stylists of 1980", highlighting "her sly, sexy warbling and tremendous control". Ultimate Classic Rock critic Matt Wardlaw rated it the Pretenders' best song, saying that it is the song "all of the elements really came together – a cool groove and an especially sultry vocal from Hynde."

The lyrics notably mix in both British and American slang of the time. "Brass" is a Northern English expression for money, referring to copper coins. The term "Detroit leaning" refers to a posture when driving a car.

== Release ==
"Brass in Pocket" was released as the band's third single. It was their first big success, reaching number one on the UK Singles Chart for two weeks in January 1980 (making it the first new number-one single of the 1980s), number two in Australia during May 1980 (for three weeks), and number 14 on the Billboard Hot 100 chart in the United States. It was listed at number 389 on Rolling Stone's "500 Greatest Songs of All Time" in 2021.

In the video for the song, Hynde plays a lonely waitress in a backstreet cafe. The rest of the band arrives in a large pink American car driven by Pete Farndon. The three men peruse the menus but are soon joined by their female partners. All six then leave the restaurant. Hynde commented on the ending of the video, "The 'Brass in Pocket' video got hijacked by the director, because the idea of that was that these guys were going to break in on motorcycles and I was going to get on the back and ride out of there. And he had different ideas, and he left me in there crying. That wasn't my script."

The video was filmed in North Kensington. The cafe's location was at the intersection of Middle Row and Southern Row.

== Chart performance ==
=== Weekly charts ===
Weekly chart performance for "Brass in Pocket"
Chart (1979–1980)	Peak position
Australia (Kent Music Report)	2
Belgium (Ultratop 50 Flanders)	5
Canada Top Singles (RPM)	5
Ireland (IRMA)	1
Netherlands (Dutch Top 40)	7
Netherlands (Single Top 100)	11
New Zealand (Recorded Music NZ)	2
South Africa (Springbok Radio)	1
Spain (AFE)	9
Sweden (Sverigetopplistan)	1
UK Singles (Official Charts)	1
US Billboard Hot 100	14
US Billboard Hot Dance Club Play	28
US Cash Box	13
US Record World	15

=== Year-end charts ===
Year-end chart performance for "Brass in Pocket"
Chart (1980)	Rank
Australia (Kent Music Report)	5
Belgium (Ultratop 50 Flanders)	26
Canada Top Singles (RPM)	42
Netherlands (Dutch Top 40)	52
Netherlands (Single Top 100)	54
South Africa (Springbok Radio)	12
UK Singles Chart	35
US Billboard Hot 100	41
US Cash Box	80

== Certifications ==
Certifications for "Brass in Pocket"
Region	Certification	Certified units/sales
New Zealand (RMNZ)	2× Platinum	60,000^{‡}
United Kingdom (BPI)	Gold	500,000^{^}
^{*} Sales figures based on certification alone.^{‡} Sales+streaming figures based on certification alone.

== Covers ==
The song was covered by Suede for NME's charity compilation Ruby Trax. It also features in its expanded debut album edition released in 2018.

== See also ==
- List of number-one singles of 1980 (Ireland)
- List of number-one singles and albums in Sweden
- List of UK Singles Chart number ones of the 1980s
