= Stop Your Sobbing =

1964 song by the Kinks

Song by the Kinks

from the album Kinks
- Released: 2 October 1964
- Recorded: August 1964
- Studio: Pye, London
- Genre: Pop
- Length: 2:06
- Label: Pye
- Songwriter: Ray Davies
- Producer: Shel Talmy

"Stop Your Sobbing" is a song written by Ray Davies for the Kinks' debut album, Kinks. It was later covered by the Pretenders as their first single.

== Background ==
The Kinks recorded "Stop Your Sobbing" on Kinks, which was rushed out in order to capitalize on the success of "You Really Got Me". Kinks biographer Rob Jovanovic writes that "Stop Your Sobbing" was supposedly written by Ray about a former girlfriend who, fearing that fame would change him, broke down in tears upon seeing how popular he had become. Davies biographer Thomas Kitts instead suggests that the song may have been inspired by Davies having recently broken up with an old girlfriend.

The song has the singer upset that his girlfriend cries too much, and he wants her to stop. The singer's pleas fail and by the end of the song he remains frustrated at the unresolved situation.

AllMusic's Tom Maginnis described the track as "grounded more heavily in the classic 50s style of songwriting and playing," and said that "'Stop Your Sobbing' is a far cry from the wild aggression of ”You Really Got Me”." Music critic Johnny Rogan described it as "a hidden gem in the Kinks canon." Rogan praises how Davies' "fragile vocal" works well with the theme. It was not released as a single.

A live version of the song appeared on One for the Road, and the studio version appeared on The Ultimate Collection.

== The Pretenders version ==
"Stop Your Sobbing"

Single by the Pretenders

from the album Pretenders
- B-side: "The Wait"
- Released: 12 January 1979
- Recorded: 1978
- Genre: Pop rock
- Length: 2:38
- Label: Real; Sire (US)
- Songwriter: Ray Davies
- Producer: Nick Lowe

The Pretenders singles chronology
"Stop Your Sobbing" (1979)	"Kid" (1979)

In January 1979, the Pretenders released their version of "Stop Your Sobbing" as their first single. The track would be included on their self-titled debut album, released a year later, which reached no.1 in the UK and the Top Ten in the US. Pretenders frontwoman Chrissie Hynde had been a longtime Kinks fan and suggested the band try the song. She explained, "I pulled it out of the air when we were in rehearsals, surprised that no one had heard it before". Ray Davies and Hynde eventually met at a New York club in 1980, beginning a relationship which eventually resulted in the birth of a child.

The Pretenders' version of "Stop Your Sobbing" was one of three demos given to Nick Lowe and became the A-side for the first single the band released. After this recording, Lowe abandoned the fledgling group claiming that the band was "not going anywhere". Lowe recalled of the experience:

Chrissie and I were friends before that. She asked me to produce her group because her guitar player, Jimmy Honeyman-Scott, was a fan of mine. He liked Rockpile, which I was in by that time. Anyway, it shows what I knew – I didn't really think Chrissie's songs were very good. But she kept going on with me about making a record with her, with her new group. And she sent me a tape. The one song that jumped out at me was this Kinks song, the one cover song that she wanted to do, 'Stop Your Sobbing.' I thought it was so fantastic. So I said, 'I'll definitely do that one.'

Despite Lowe's skepticism, the single made the UK Top 40, reaching number 34 and became the first of more than a dozen UK Top 40 hits for the band. It also afforded the band their first studio appearance on Top of the Pops in February 1979. It didn't perform quite as well in the US, reaching number 65 on the Billboard Hot 100, but was the first of ten Billboard Hot 100 hits for the band.

This was one of many songs initially recorded by the Kinks that were covered by other bands during the late seventies and early eighties. Others include the version of "David Watts" recorded by the Jam, "The Hard Way" by the Knack, and "I Go to Sleep", an unreleased track written by Ray Davies, which, like "Stop Your Sobbing", was covered by the Pretenders.

Rolling Stone critic Ken Tucker calls the Pretenders' "Stop Your Sobbing" "ideal radio fare," describing it as having "Labour of Lust's feathery pop feel" and that "echoed to enhance Davies' wistful melancholy, Hynde sounded like a solo Mamas and the Papas, but her tone surged at the ends of choruses to imply enormous resentment at even having to think about sobbing." Cash Box said that "Lowe's production captures the jangling guitars perfectly and Chrissie Hynde's vocals are confident yet sensual." Record World called it a "a contagious rocker that's...powerful pop."
