= Kid (Pretenders song) =

Single by the Pretenders

from the album Pretenders
- B-side: "Tattooed Love Boys"
- Released: 29 June 1979
- Recorded: 1979
- Genre: Rock and roll; pop rock; new wave
- Length: 3:03
- Label: Real; Sire (US)
- Songwriter: Chrissie Hynde
- Producer: Chris Thomas

The Pretenders singles chronology
"Stop Your Sobbing" (1979)	"Kid" (1979)	"Brass in Pocket" (1979)

Music video
- "Kid" on YouTube

"Kid" is a song written by Chrissie Hynde that was recorded and released by her band the Pretenders in 1979. It was the band's second single and was included on their eponymously titled debut album which was released in early 1980. Hynde wrote the song about a fictional boy discovering that his mother is a prostitute. The song's melodicism was attributed by guitarist James Honeyman-Scott to Hynde's growing interest in pop music. Honeyman-Scott wrote the song's solo, which he had designed over a couple of days.

"Kid" peaked at number 33 in the UK, becoming the band's second British Top 40 hit. It has been covered by several other artists, including Everything but the Girl.

== Background ==
Of the lyrics to "Kid," Hynde stated, "It's about a prostitute whose son finds out what she does for a living and this is her having a conversation with him. Not all songs are autobiographical."

Guitarist James Honeyman-Scott attributed the song's melodic quality to Hynde's shift from punk to pop; he explained, "Chrissie started to like pop music, and that’s why she started writing things like 'Kid.'" Honeyman-Scott also assisted in arranging the song and composed the guitar solo. Drummer Martin Chambers said of Honeyman-Scott's solo:

Jimmy would be the person that said, 'Right, there's eight bars here that I can put a really good stamp on.' He would go back with a guitar, sit on the bed and just work out what sounded really good. I've got the demo of 'Kid' that has a different ending than what's on the record, but the solo is absolutely the same. Jimmy had gone somewhere for a couple of evenings, and he had worked on it so he could play it fluently when it was ready to record.

Johnny Marr of the Smiths, who cited Honeyman-Scott as an influence, often used "Kid" as a warm-up song before gigs.

== Music and lyrics ==
Author Alex Ogg describes "Kid" as a "resonant ballad." The lyrics express the singer's devotion to the listener, who may be her child, but could also be her lover or just a friend. Allmusic critic Stewart Mason calls it "an all-time classic rock and roll love song" and "probably the [Pretenders'] masterpiece." He particularly praises Hynde's "beautiful and emotional" lead vocals, and James Honeyman-Scott's lead guitar playing, which he says sounds like the Byrds at times but also sounds tougher when necessary.

Record World said that "Chrissie bares her heart and soul with a priceless vocal performance" and that "sharp, guitar icing covers the love song with riffs and rhythm rings while the pace maintains a medium rock tempo, but the feel is pure ballad."

Allmusic critic Stephen Thomas Erlewine praised how Honeyman-Scott's "unconventional" playing adds additional dimensions to the "measured pop" of "Kid". Author Jeremy Simmonds said of "Kid" that it "showed the group's complete mastery of sixties hooks with sharp. confident new wave leanings." Rolling Stone Album Guide critic J.D. Considine praises how melody expresses "emotional vulnerability." Considine also praises how the band adds "soul" to the song's "sentimentality." According to Mason, the Pretenders' later single "Show Me" was partially a rewrite of "Kid."

Ultimate Classic Rock critic Bryan Wawzenek rated it one of drummer Martin Chambers' 5th best Pretenders songs, saying that Chambers "just soars to the bridge, where he gets to flash a little muscle. And then he steals a few stutter beats from the Ronettes to let 'Kid' wander down girl-group lane."

== Release ==
"Kid" was released as the Pretenders' second single in 1979, prior to the release of their debut album, following "Stop Your Sobbing." It performed slightly better on the UK charts than "Stop Your Sobbing," reaching number 33 whereas "Stop Your Sobbing" reached number 34. However, the band's follow up single "Brass in Pocket" performed even better, reaching #1.

The song's single release was accompanied by a music video, which featured the band at an amusement park.

Since its original release, "Kid" has appeared on a number of Pretenders' compilation albums. including The Singles and Greatest Hits. It also appears on the Pretenders' 1995 live album The Isle of View, in which Hynde is backed by a string quartet.

== Charts ==
Chart (1990)	Peak position
Australia (Kent Music Report)	90
UK Singles (Official Charts)	33

== Well-known cover versions ==
Everything but the Girl covered "Kid" on the US version of their 1985 album Love Not Money, with Tracey Thorn playing piano and singing solo vocal. Allmusic's Mason praised this as the best cover version of "Kid." However, fellow Allmusic critic William Ruhlmann claimed that adding the song to the US version did not enhance the album's appeal.
