= Pretenders (album) =

Studio album by the Pretenders
- Released: 11 January 1980
- Recorded: 1978–1979
- Studios: Wessex Sound, London; AIR, London
- Genres: New wave; punk rock; rock and roll; college rock; power pop; jangle pop
- Length: 47:12
- Label: Real
- Producers: Chris Thomas; Nick Lowe

The Pretenders chronology
Pretenders (1980)	Extended Play (1981)

Singles from Pretenders
- 1. "Stop Your Sobbing" Released: 12 January 1979; 2. "Kid" Released: 29 June 1979; 3. "Brass in Pocket" Released: 9 November 1979; 4. "Precious" Released: 26 July 1980 (EU)

Pretenders is the debut studio album by British-American band the Pretenders, released on 11 January 1980. A combination of rock and roll, punk and new wave music, it was an immediate success. The album features the singles "Stop Your Sobbing" (a cover of the 1964 Kinks deep cut), "Kid" and "Brass in Pocket". The track "Private Life" would be covered later that same year by Jamaican singer Grace Jones for her fourth studio album Warm Leatherette and was released as a single that June, reaching number 17 on the UK singles chart.

Nick Lowe produced the Pretenders' first single, "Stop Your Sobbing", but decided not to work with them again as he thought the band was "not going anywhere". Chris Thomas took over on the subsequent recording sessions.

== Release ==
Pretenders debuted at number one on the UK Albums Chart in the week of its release and stayed there for four consecutive weeks. It also made the top 10 on the Billboard 200 and was certified platinum during 1982 by the RIAA.

Pretenders was remastered and re-released in 2006 and included a bonus disc of demos, B-sides and live cuts, many previously unreleased. "Cuban Slide" and "Porcelain" originally appeared as B-sides to "Talk of the Town" and "Message of Love", while "Swinging London" and "Nervous But Shy" both appeared on the flip side of "Brass in Pocket". The Regents Park demo of "Stop Your Sobbing" was included initially as a flexi-single in the May 1981 edition of Flexipop magazine. The tracks "Message of Love", "Talk of the Town", "Porcelain" and "Cuban Slide" alongside a live version of the album's opening track, "Precious", were released on a follow-up EP entitled Extended Play soon after.

Pretenders was also reissued in 2009 by Audio Fidelity as a limited-edition audiophile gold CD, using the original master tapes. However, this remaster suffered from unauthorized, heavy limiting supposedly applied after engineer Steve Hoffman's digital master was created and approved for CD manufacturing. The song "The Phone Call" is missing some of the telephone effects on this release because the effects were "flown in" after the master was completed for the song and, as a result, were not on the original master tape. There were no bonus tracks included.

A shortened version of "Tequila" would be performed nearly 15 years later on the Last of the Independents. "Sabre Dance" features Chrissie Hynde singing portions of "Stop Your Sobbing" over solos by James Honeyman-Scott.

A cover version of "Brass in Pocket" and the master version of "Precious" were released as downloadable content for Rock Band.

A cover version of “Tattooed Love Boys” was featured as a playable track in the rhythm video game Guitar Hero II.

Another deluxe edition of the album, curated by Hynde, was released on 5 November 2021 and features the original album remastered by Chris Thomas, alongside demos, rarities, and many live performances. These include BBC sessions on The Kid Jensen Show, and performances at The Paris Theatre in London and Paradise Theater in Boston.

== Critical reception ==
Retrospective reviews
Review scores
Source	Rating
AllMusic	5/5 stars
Blender	5/5 stars
Chicago Tribune	4/4 stars
Mojo	5/5 stars
Rolling Stone	5/5 stars
The Rolling Stone Album Guide	5/5 stars
Spin	5/5 stars
Spin Alternative Record Guide	10/10
Uncut	9/10
The Village Voice	A−

Contemporary reviews for the album were mixed. In Melody Maker, Chris Brazier called the record "the first important album" of the 1980s, and while the second side of the album was better than the first side, overall "the album is irresistible". However, Tony Stewart of NME criticised Melody Maker for hyping the band, and said that "so much about the Pretenders is reminiscent of '60s pop games that any claim they are innovative is completely invalid". Stewart noted influences from the Velvet Underground, the Beatles, the 1960s beat boom, Blondie and the Police, and while he acknowledged Hynde's talents as a frontwoman, he dismissed the band's playing and inability to lift the music to the level of the lyrics, stating that "they seem unable to give it an edge".

Sounds's Robbi Millar said of the album, "Its success, which should be fairly apparent through the next few months, will be valued not through hype and wildly enthusiastic pen-happy journalists but through a number of strong album tracks." Millar also noted several influences, including Sting and Public Image Ltd, and that the album included three singles and two B-sides that had already been released, but that it also included "seven other worthy tracks" which resulted in "one fine first album".

In 1989, Rolling Stone ranked Pretenders the 20th best album of the 1980s. In 2012, Slant Magazine listed Pretenders at number 64 on its list of the best albums of the 1980s.

Pretenders has been named one of the best albums of all time by VH1 (No. 52). In 2003, Rolling Stone ranked the album at number 155 on its list of the 500 greatest albums of all time, with Pretenders maintaining the rating in the 2012 revised list, and moving up to number 152 on the 2020 revision. In 2020, Rolling Stone included the band's debut album in their "80 Greatest albums of 1980" list.

Ultimate Classic Rock critic Bryan Wawzenek rated "Precious", "Kid", "Tattooed Love Boys" and "Brass in Pocket" as being among drummer Martin Chambers' top 10 Pretenders songs.

"This is one of the most astonishing debut albums in the history of music," enthused author Michael Chabon. "On songs like 'Tattooed Love Boys', you're wondering, Who is Chrissie singing about when she says, 'I shot my mouth off and you showed me what that hole was for?' That was just one of those obsessive-listening records for me." In her autobiography, Hynde confirms she is singing about herself and her own personal experience.

In 2016, the album was inducted into the Grammy Hall of Fame.

== Track listing ==
All tracks are written by Chrissie Hynde, except where noted. All tracks on the original album were produced by Chris Thomas, except "Stop Your Sobbing" produced by Nick Lowe.

Side one
No.	Title	Writer(s)	Length
1.	"Precious"		3:36
2.	"The Phone Call"		2:29
3.	"Up the Neck"		4:27
4.	"Tattooed Love Boys"		2:59
5.	"Space Invader"	Pete Farndon; James Honeyman-Scott	3:26
6.	"The Wait"	Hynde; Farndon	3:35
7.	"Stop Your Sobbing"	Ray Davies	2:38

Side two
No.	Title	Writer(s)	Length
1.	"Kid"		3:06
2.	"Private Life"		6:25
3.	"Brass in Pocket"	Hynde; Honeyman-Scott	3:04
4.	"Lovers of Today"		5:51
5.	"Mystery Achievement"		5:22

2006 reissue bonus disc
No.	Title	Writer(s)	Length
1.	"Cuban Slide"	Honeyman-Scott; Hynde	4:33
2.	"Porcelain"		3:54
3.	"The Phone Call" (demo, late 1977)		4:33
4.	"The Wait" (Regents Park demo, 12 April 1978)	Farndon; Hynde	3:08
5.	"I Can't Control Myself" (Regents Park demo, 12 April 1978)	Reg Presley	4:24
6.	"Swinging London" (instrumental)	Farndon; Honeyman-Scott; Hynde; Martin Chambers	1:55
7.	"Brass in Pocket" (AIR Studios demo, 6 February 1978)	Honeyman-Scott; Hynde	3:48
8.	"Kid" (Olympic Studios demo, 6 December 1978)		4:04
9.	"Stop Your Sobbing" (Regents Park demo, 12 April 1978)	Davies	3:48
10.	"Tequila" (Regents Park demo, 12 April 1978)		5:22
11.	"Nervous but Shy" (instrumental)	Farndon; Honeyman-Scott; Hynde; Chambers	3:48
12.	"I Need Somebody" (live on The Kid Jensen Show, BBC Radio 1, 17 July 1979)	Rudy Martinez	3:48
13.	"Mystery Achievement" (live on The Kid Jensen Show, BBC Radio 1, 17 July 1979)		4:54
14.	"Precious" (live at the Paradise Theatre, Boston, 23 March 1980)		3:26
15.	"Tattooed Love Boys" (live at the Paradise Theatre, Boston, 23 March 1980)		3:06
16.	"Sabre Dance" (live at the Marquee Club, London, 2 April 1979) (contains elements of "Stop Your Sobbing")	Aram Khachaturian; Davies	3:50

== Personnel ==
The Pretenders

- Chrissie Hynde – vocals, rhythm guitars
- Martin Chambers – drums, percussion, backing vocals
- Pete Farndon – bass guitar, backing vocals
- James Honeyman-Scott – lead and rhythm guitars, keyboards, backing vocals

Additional musicians

- Chris Thomas – additional keyboards, sound effects, production
- Fred Berk – bass guitar on CD2, track 3
- Geoff Bryant – French horn
- Henry Lowther – trumpet
- Gerry Mackelduff – drums on CD2, tracks 4, 5, 7, 9, 10
- Chris Mercer – saxophone
- Nigel Pegrum – drums on CD2, track 3
- Jim Wilson – trumpet

Technical

- Nick Lowe – production on "Stop Your Sobbing"
- Bill Price – recording and mixing (Wessex)
- Steve Nye – additional recording (AIR)
- Mike Stavrou – mixing on "Brass in Pocket"
- Kevin Hughes – design
- Chalkie Davies – front cover photography

== Charts ==
=== Weekly charts ===
Chart (1980)	Peak position
Australia (Kent Music Report)	6
Dutch Albums (Album Top 100)	14
New Zealand Albums (RMNZ)	2
Norwegian Albums (VG-lista)	24
Swedish Albums (Sverigetopplistan)	2
UK Albums (Official Charts)	1
US Billboard 200	9

Chart (2022)	Peak position
Hungarian Albums (MAHASZ)	27

=== Year-end charts ===
Chart (1980)	Position
Dutch Albums (Album Top 100)	61
New Zealand Albums (RMNZ)	17
US Billboard 200	19

== Certifications ==
Region	Certification	Certified units/sales
Australia (ARIA)	Platinum	50,000^{^}
Belgium (BRMA)	Gold	25,000^{*}
Netherlands (NVPI)	Gold	50,000^{^}
New Zealand (RMNZ)	Gold	7,500^{^}
Spain (Promusicae)	Gold	50,000^{^}
United Kingdom (BPI)	Gold	100,000^{^}
United States (RIAA)	Platinum	1,000,000^{^}
^{*} Sales figures based on certification alone.^{^} Shipments figures based on certification alone.
