= Last of the Independents =

Studio album by the Pretenders
- Released: 9 May 1994
- Recorded: October 1993 – February 1994
- Studios: Townhouse, London; Sarm West, London; The Wool Hall, Bath
- Genre: Alternative rock
- Length: 49:14
- Labels: Sire; WEA
- Producers: Stephen Street; Ian Stanley; Chris Thomas

The Pretenders chronology
Packed! (1990)	Last of the Independents (1994)	The Isle of View (1995)

Singles from Last of the Independents
- 1. "I'll Stand by You" Released: 11 April 1994; 2. "Night in My Veins" Released: 12 April 1994 (US) (Note: Released in the UK on 13 June 1994.); 3. "977" Released: 3 October 1994

Professional ratings
Review scores
Source	Rating
AllMusic	3/5 stars
Chicago Tribune	3/4 stars
Robert Christgau	(2-star Honorable Mention)
Entertainment Weekly	A−
Knoxville News Sentinel	4/5 stars
Music Week	4/5 stars
NME	6/10
Rolling Stone	4/5 stars
The Rolling Stone Album Guide	3.5/5 stars
Select	4/5 medals
Trouser Press	(unfavorable)

Last of the Independents is the sixth studio album by English American rock band the Pretenders, released in 1994. For this album, the band is officially credited as being Chrissie Hynde (vocals, guitar), Adam Seymour (guitar), Andy Hobson (bass) and Martin Chambers (drums). However, this line-up only plays together on one track ("All My Dreams"); the rest of the album is performed by Hynde and Seymour in conjunction with a rotating series of musicians on bass and drums. These musicians include Hobson and Chambers, as well as bassists Andy Rourke, Tom Kelly and David Paton, and drummers Jimmy Copley and J.F.T. Hood. A few other session musicians also appear, including Ian Stanley (formerly of Tears for Fears), and one-time Pretenders guitarist Robbie McIntosh, who plays alongside Hynde and Seymour on "I'm a mother". The album marked the official return of Chambers, who had been fired by Hynde eight years prior.

In addition to a cover of "Forever Young" the band previously recorded for the film With Honors and was also featured in the end credits (which features orca footage shot by Bob Talbot) to Free Willy 2: The Adventure Home, the album featured several songs Hynde co-wrote with the songwriting team of Billy Steinberg and Kelly, who wrote several hits for other musicians. That collaboration resulted in singles "Night in My Veins" and "I'll Stand by You" with the latter becoming a hit.

== Track listing ==
1. "Hollywood Perfume" (Chrissie Hynde, Billy Steinberg, Tom Kelly) – 3:55
2. "Night in My Veins" (Hynde, Steinberg, Kelly) – 3:15
3. "Money Talk" (Hynde) – 3:38
4. "977" (Hynde, Steinberg, Kelly) – 3:54
5. "Revolution" (Hynde) – 4:32
6. "All My Dreams" (Hynde) – 3:12
7. "I'll Stand by You" (Hynde, Steinberg, Kelly) – 3:59
8. "I'm a Mother" (Hynde, J.F.T. Hood) – 5:18
9. "Tequila" (Hynde) – 1:13
10. "Every Mother's Son" (Hynde) – 3:41
11. "Rebel Rock Me" (Hynde) – 3:08
12. "Love Colours" (Hynde, Steinberg, Kelly) – 4:32
13. "Forever Young" (Bob Dylan) – 5:04

Note: The version of "Tequila" presented here is an arrangement of a fragment of the song. Full versions can be heard on the two-CD version of Pretenders and the Pirate Radio box set, as well as the 1995 single release of "2000 Miles" and "Happy Christmas".

== Personnel ==
Adapted from the album's liner notes.

The Pretenders

- Chrissie Hynde – guitar (1–3, 5–12), vocals
- Adam Seymour – guitar (1–13)
- Andy Hobson – bass guitar (1, 6, 13)
- Martin Chambers – drums (3, 4, 6, 12)

Additional musicians

- Robbie McIntosh – guitar (8)
- Andy Rourke – bass guitar (2, 3, 5, 9–12)
- Ian Stanley – organ (5), special effects (2), keyboards (8)
- J.F.T. Hood – drums (1, 7, 13), special effects (8)
- Jim Copley – drums (2, 5, 8–11)
- David Paton – bass guitar (7)
- Tom Kelly – bass guitar (4), piano (4, 7), guitar (7)
- London Community Gospel Choir – choir (7)
- David Lord – string arrangement (7)

Technical

- Ian Stanley – producer (1, 2, 5, 7–11, 13)
- Stephen Street – producer, engineer (3, 4, 6, 12)
- Chris Thomas – producer (8)
- Steve Williams – engineer (1, 2, 5, 7, 9–11, 13)
- Julie Gardener – assistant engineer (3, 4, 6, 12)
- Jon Jacobs – engineer (8)
- Richard Lowe – assistant engineer (8)
- Greig Sangster – assistant engineer (8)
- Jamie Cullum – assistant engineer (8)
- Bob Clearmountain – mixing (3, 4, 6, 12)
- Tony Phillips – mixing (8)
- Stylorouge – artwork
- Simon Fowler – cover photography

== Charts ==
Chart performance for Last of the Independents
Chart (1994)	Peak position
Australian Albums (ARIA)	22
Austrian Albums (Ö3 Austria)	36
Canada Top Albums/CDs (RPM)	26
Dutch Albums (Album Top 100)	50
German Albums (Offizielle Top 100)	42
New Zealand Albums (RMNZ)	14
Norwegian Albums (VG-lista)	16
Swedish Albums (Sverigetopplistan)	6
Swiss Albums (Schweizer Hitparade)	26
UK Albums (Official Charts)	8
US Billboard 200	41

== Certifications and sales ==
Certifications and sales for Last of the Independents
Region	Certification	Certified units/sales
France (SNEP)	Gold	100,000^{*}
United Kingdom (BPI)	Gold	100,000^{^}
United States (RIAA)	Gold	600,000
^{*} Sales figures based on certification alone.^{^} Shipments figures based on certification alone.
