= Katydids (band) =

English band

- Origin: England
- Genres: Jangle pop, alternative rock, college rock
- Years active: 1989–1991, 2014
- Labels: Reprise
- Members: Susie Hug; Adam Seymour
- Past members: Dan James; David Hunter; Shane Young

Katydids were an English band, founded by the vocalist Susie Hug and guitarist Adam Seymour, adding Dan James on guitar, David Hunter on bass guitar, and Shane Young on drums in the late 1980s. In December 1989, NME had commented that Katydids were one of their tips for stardom in the 1990s. NMEs list also included Carter The Unstoppable Sex Machine, The Charlatans, The Mock Turtles, Ride and The Popinjays. However, after two unsuccessful albums, Reprise dropped Katydids and they split up until new Katydids music surfaced in 2014.

After a long hiatus, Hug embarked on a solo career, releasing two EPs and an album. Her husband, Adam Seymour, played with The Pretenders shortly after Katydids broke up.

The band has released two EPs on SoundCloud in 2014.

== Albums ==
Katydids – Reprise 7599-26146-2 (1990)

- Produced by Nick Lowe
- All songs by Hug/Seymour
1. "Heavy Weather Traffic"
2. "Stop Start"
3. "Girl in a Jigsaw Puzzle"
4. "All Above Me"
5. "What Will the Angels Say?"
6. "Lights Out (Read My Lips)"
7. "Miss Misery"
8. "King of the World"
9. "Chains of Devotion"
10. "Dr. Rey"
11. "Growing Old"

Shangri-la – Reprise 7599-26626-2 (1991)

- Produced by Ray Shulman (and * Ian Broudie)
- All songs by Hug/Seymour
1. "The Boy Who's Never Found"
2. "Almost and Nearly"
3. "Slip Away"
4. "Many of My Friends"
5. "Some Mysterious Sigh"
6. "Seesaw" *
7. "Faith to Change"
8. "Always" *
9. "Don't Think Twice"
10. "What's the Matter Here?"

== EPs ==
Meet the Katydids (2014)

- Hug/Seymour
- running time: 17:15
1. "Road to Love & Luck"
2. "Misery Love Company"
3. "Countdown to the Sun"
4. "This One to One"
5. "Tell Me Why"

Presents (2014)

- Produced, mixed & performed by Susie Hug & Adam Seymour
- running time: 13:31
1. "Jingle Shake"
2. "Silver Jingle Bells"
3. "Bad Xmas"
4. "Glistening"
5. "Winter Snow is Falling"
6. "Calling Time"

== Singles ==
All songs by Hug/Seymour except as noted

"Girl in a Jigsaw Puzzle" – Reprise W9758 (1989)

1. "Girl in a Jigsaw Puzzle"
2. "Space Where Love Was"
3. "Girl in a Jigsaw Puzzle" (Japanese)

"Lights Out (Read My Lips)" – Reprise W9852 (1990)

1. "Lights Out (Read My Lips)"
2. "Disappointed"
3. "Another August Night"
4. "Lights Out (Read My Lips)" (Acoustic)

"Seesaw" – Reprise W0051 (1991)

1. "Seesaw"
2. "Colour Me Gone"
3. "Peace Love & Understanding" (Nick Lowe)
4. "Seesaw" (acoustic)

"The Boy Who's Never Found" – Reprise W0065 (1991)

1. "The Boy Who's Never Found"
2. "Charity Power"
3. "Faith to Change" (demo)
4. "Almost and Nearly" (acoustic)

"Some Mysterious Sigh" – Reprise W0082 (1992)

1. "Some Mysterious Sigh" (remix edit)
2. "Forever Untold"
3. "Some Mysterious Sigh" (acoustic)
4. "Some Mysterious Sigh" (remix)
