= Back on the Chain Gang =

1982 single by the Pretenders

Single by the Pretenders

from the album The King of Comedy and Learning to Crawl
- B-side: "My City Was Gone"
- Released: September 17, 1982
- Recorded: July 1982
- Studio: AIR (London, England)
- Genre: Rock; power pop
- Length: 3:51
- Label: Sire
- Songwriter: Chrissie Hynde
- Producer: Chris Thomas

The Pretenders singles chronology
"I Go to Sleep" (1981)	"Back on the Chain Gang" (1982)	"My City Was Gone" (1983)

Music video
- "Back on the Chain Gang" on YouTube

"Back on the Chain Gang" is a song written by American-British musician Chrissie Hynde, originally recorded by her band the Pretenders and released as a single by Sire Records in September 1982. The song was included on The King of Comedy soundtrack album in March 1983 and was later included on the Pretenders' third studio album, Learning to Crawl, in January 1984.

"Back on the Chain Gang" entered the U.S. Billboard Hot 100 chart, reaching No. 5 to become the band's biggest hit in the United States. It also peaked at No. 4 on the Billboard Rock Top Tracks chart and No. 17 on the UK Singles Chart. The single's B-side, "My City Was Gone", later became a substantial hit in the U.S., with lyrics about Ohio.

== Recording ==
"Back on the Chain Gang" was recorded after James Honeyman-Scott, the Pretenders guitarist, died of a drug overdose at the age of 25 on June 16, 1982. This came two days after the Pretenders fired their longtime bassist Pete Farndon because of his drug problem. On July 20, 1982, the band began recording the song at AIR Studios in London. At that time, only two Pretenders were left: singer-songwriter Chrissie Hynde, who was about three months pregnant with her first daughter, and drummer Martin Chambers. In a 1983 interview, Chambers commented: "We had rehearsed it a lot with Jimmy, and thought it would make a pretty good single".

Other musicians were hired to fill out the session: lead guitarist Billy Bremner of Rockpile, guitarist Robbie McIntosh, and bassist Tony Butler who was already at the studio for a Big Country recording project. The producer was Chris Thomas who was familiar to the band from his integral role in making the Pretenders' earlier records, using Bill Price as his engineer, but for this session Steve Churchyard replaced Price because Price was committed to another AIR project at Wessex Sound Studios.

Most of the song was recorded quickly with the band placed close together in the studio, arranged as if performing live, with Chambers' drums up on a riser. Small loudspeakers were aimed at the musicians from behind Chambers to reinforce the sound of selected drums such as the snare. Bremner's featured guitar solo was performed in one take. Later, alone in the studio as was her preference, Hynde performed her main vocal line with three or four overdubs dropped in to fix minor imperfections. She then recorded her own backing vocals. Finally, the rest of the backing vocals were performed by Chambers and Butler, along with the chain-gang chant. The sound of clanging hammers was made by banging various metal pieces together, especially the 25-pound (11 kg) weights that the studio used as ballast for large boom stands. This effect was performed by studio assistant Jeremy Allom. The recording of extra parts for the song and the final mixing process continued for several days after initial recording began.

== Composition ==
Hynde wrote "Back on the Chain Gang" as a memorial to Honeyman-Scott. The song was written during the strained relationship that Chrissie Hynde had with Ray Davies (of the Kinks) and was recorded when she was about three months pregnant with their daughter. Their on-and-off relationship ended half a year later.

In a 2009 interview series In the Studio with Redbeard, Hynde said: "In the early days we were full of enthusiasm and we wanted the same things … and everything was going well … it seemed too easy … I was with someone I was in love with … then I got pregnant."

She described working on "Back on the Chain Gang" with Honeyman-Scott. Just a month before the song was recorded, the Pretenders fired bass player Pete Farndon. Then, within days, lead guitarist Honeyman-Scott died of an accidental drug overdose. Farndon would also die of a drug overdose ten months later. Hynde recounted, "… two days later Jimmy [Honeyman-Scott]’s dead … really suddenly, it went from everything to nothing … I was traumatized at the loss of my two best friends … I had to get on with replacing two members of the band — to replace my best friends …"

"Back on the Chain Gang" took on deeper meaning for Hynde, with the death of her friend and the urgent pressure to find new band members to complete the upcoming album. She stated that "I dedicated [the song] to [James Honeyman-Scott] in some ways … Jimmy was a big admirer of Billy Bremner … when we had to record "Back on the Chain Gang"—well, I knew that Billy and Robbie [McIntosh] were who Jimmy would have wanted to get in, so I didn't need to think about it."

The hammering sounds and the chain-gang chant heard during the chorus of the song echo the earlier production of Sam Cooke's song "Chain Gang", released in 1960.

In an interview with Guitar World in 1992, George Harrison claimed that "Back on the Chain Gang" uses a chord that he had "invented" for the Beatles song "I Want to Tell You": "That's an E7 with an F on top, and I'm really proud of that because I invented that chord... There's only been one other song, to my knowledge, where somebody copped that chord – Chrissie Hynde and the Pretenders on 'Back on the Chain Gang.'"

== Reception ==
Ultimate Classic Rock critic Matt Wardlaw rated it the Pretenders all-time second best song, saying that it "maintains a deceptively upbeat tone, considering the subject matter."

== Music video ==
The music video, their first after Honeyman-Scott's death and Farndon's firing in 1982, featured Hynde and Chambers, the only two remaining Pretenders at that time. The video was directed by Don Letts and begins with shots of people jumping in the sky, before dissolving into a shot of people walking across London Bridge; Chambers is among the crowd, as Hynde watches him from the railing of Waterloo Bridge. She follows him around. Chambers arrives at a building and walks into a supposed office; as soon as he walks off-screen; Hynde enters and as she walks further, the "office" dissolves as a backdrop to a chain gang using pickaxes to excavate chalk cliffs. Hynde walks through the quarry; she sees that Chambers is on the chain gang. More shots of people jumping alternate with more shots of people walking across the bridge.

== Personnel ==
Personnel taken from Learning to Crawl liner notes, and Sound on Sound.

- Chrissie Hynde – lead and harmony vocals, guitar
- Martin Chambers – drums, backing vocals
- Robbie McIntosh – rhythm guitar

Additional musicians

- Billy Bremner – lead guitar
- Tony Butler – bass guitar, backing vocals
- Jeremy Allom – hammer effect

== Charts ==
=== Weekly charts ===
Chart (1983)	Peak position
Australia (Kent Music Report)	11
Belgium (Ultratop 50 Flanders)	34
Canada Top Singles (RPM)	5
Ireland (IRMA)	21
Netherlands (Single Top 100)	31
New Zealand (Recorded Music NZ)	14
UK Singles (Official Charts)	17
U.S. Billboard Hot 100	5
U.S. Rock Top Tracks (Billboard)	4
U.S. Cash Box Top 100	5

=== Year-end charts ===
Chart (1983)	Rank
Australia (Kent Music Report)	90
Canada Top Singles (RPM)	47
U.S. Billboard Hot 100	26
U.S. Cash Box	28

== Certifications ==
Certifications for Back on the Chain Gang
Region	Certification	Certified units/sales
New Zealand (RMNZ)	Gold	15,000^{‡}
^{‡} Sales+streaming figures based on certification alone.

== Cover versions ==
- In January 1995, the American singer Selena released a cover version "Fotos y Recuerdos" for her fourth studio album Amor Prohibido.
- In November 2018, the English singer Morrissey released a video cover version, which was soon followed by a vinyl single release.
