= James Honeyman-Scott =

English guitarist and songwriter (1956–1982)

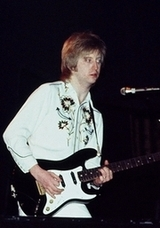
- Honeyman-Scott in December 1981

Background information
- Born: 4 November 1956; Hereford, Herefordshire, England
- Died: 16 June 1982 (aged 25) London, England
- Genres: Rock; new wave
- Occupations: Musician; songwriter
- Instruments: Guitar; keyboards; vocals
- Years active: 1974–1982
- Label: Sire
- Formerly of: The Pretenders

James Honeyman-Scott (4 November 1956 – 16 June 1982) was an English guitarist, songwriter and founding member of the rock band the Pretenders.

Honeyman-Scott established a reputation as "one of the most original and versatile guitarists of the early-'80s new wave movement." In addition to his role as lead guitarist, Honeyman-Scott co-wrote a number of songs for the band, sang backing vocals and played keyboards on a few tracks. Chrissie Hynde wrote "Back on the Chain Gang" as a tribute to him.

== Early years and musical influences ==
Honeyman-Scott, along with Pretenders bandmates Pete Farndon (bass guitar, vocals) and Martin Chambers (drums, vocals, percussion), came from Hereford. Before joining the Pretenders, Honeyman-Scott played in several bands, including a precursor to the Enid with Robert John Godfrey, the Hawks (Kelv Wilson, bass guitar & vocals; Dave Plowman, guitar; Stan Speke, drums), the Hot Band, and the Cheeks.

Honeyman-Scott acknowledged a number of influences on his guitar-playing (Guitar Player, 1981). Early musical influences included Cream and the Allman Brothers Band. Honeyman-Scott also credited Nick Lowe and Elvis Costello with their "big jangly" Rickenbacker-influenced guitar sound. During his tenure with the Pretenders, Dave Edmunds and Billy Bremner from Rockpile were influential, as well as Nils Lofgren and Chris Spedding.

== Pretenders ==
During the mid-1970s, Honeyman-Scott met future Pretenders bandmate Pete Farndon while the bassist was playing with Cold River Lady in Hereford. In 1978, Farndon recruited Honeyman-Scott for a series of Pretenders rehearsals and recording sessions, and he officially joined the group that summer. Chrissie Hynde recalled, "As soon as I heard Jimmy Scott, I knew I was getting close. Jimmy and I turned out to have a genuine musical affinity".

Honeyman-Scott's role in shaping the Pretenders' sound primarily involved adding melodic lead lines to existing songs to help tie them together. He recalled in the early days, "We did lots of rehearsing – seven days a week, all hours of the day and night. At first a lot of the licks were very heavy – like 'Up the Neck' started off as a reggae song. I said, 'Let's speed it up,' and put in that little guitar run. The melodic parts of the numbers really all started coming together by me putting in these little runs and licks. And then Chrissie started to like pop music, and that's why she started writing things like 'Kid'".

Hynde and Honeyman-Scott have both acknowledged the influence their contrasting styles had on each other. According to Honeyman-Scott, Hynde had a unique style he adjusted to in several ways: "She does quite a bit of rhythm guitar, and I don't know anybody who plays like her. It's real distinct, and I can't count her beat half the time. Instead, I just put a little guitar line over it, like the lick in 'Tattooed Love Boys'". He joked about his other strategy: "I've never told them I can't work out their time at all! They are used to me coming in a bar too late; they think that's the way I play. But it's because I've missed where she comes in! I just bluff it and hope for the best."

Hynde later summarized his influence on her playing by saying that Jimmy Scott was her "musical right-hand" and that "He really was the Pretenders sound. I don't sound like that. When I met him, I was this not-very melodic punky angry guitar player and singer and Jimmy was the melodic one. He brought out all the melody in me." Chambers later said, "Despite everything the original band accomplished in only two albums, Jimmy and Chrissie were just starting to figure out what they were capable of as a creative team."

In May and June 1982, Honeyman-Scott was first in Los Angeles and then in Austin, Texas, for a short visit with his wife Peggy Sue Fender whom he had married in April 1981. While in Austin, he became involved in his first co-production effort for an album by Stephen Doster that was never released. During the sessions with Stephen Doster in Austin, Honeyman-Scott was called back to London for a band meeting on 14 June with Chrissie Hynde and Martin Chambers that resulted in the dismissal of Pete Farndon from the Pretenders, due to Farndon's increasing substance dependence.

== Death ==
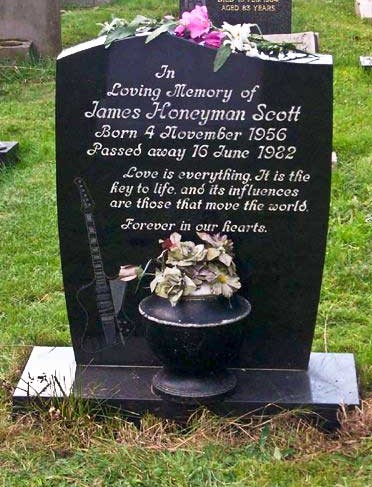
Honeyman-Scott gravesite

Two days after the dismissal of Pete Farndon, Honeyman-Scott was found dead in a girlfriend's apartment of heart failure caused by cocaine intolerance. He was 25 years old and was buried in the churchyard at St Peter's Church, Lyde, Herefordshire.

== Legacy ==
Although Honeyman-Scott died young, he influenced other well-known guitarists such as Johnny Marr, who said that "most of all, the jingle-jangle came from James Honeyman-Scott of the Pretenders. He was the last important influence on my playing before I went out on my own. The first time I played 'Kid' with the Pretenders, I couldn't believe it. I've used that solo to warm up with every day for years."

Honeyman-Scott is also credited with discovering Violent Femmes, who opened for the Pretenders at the Oriental Theatre in Milwaukee, Wisconsin, while the band was on tour.

Honeyman-Scott's death profoundly affected the Pretenders' subsequent direction and longevity. Hynde later said, "One of the things that kept the band alive, ironically, was the death of Jimmy Scott. I felt I couldn't let the music die when he died. We'd worked too hard to get it where it was.... I had to finish what we'd started". At the group meeting on 14 June 1982, Honeyman-Scott suggested bringing Robbie McIntosh into the group in some capacity. After Honeyman-Scott's death, McIntosh became the group's lead guitarist for several years.

In a 2023 interview, Hynde said that she feels guilt over the deaths of Honeyman-Scott and Pete Farndon, stating that she "did not discourage" the drug-taking that resulted in the deaths of the two band members. Farndon died in 1983 at the age of 30.

In 2005, Honeyman-Scott was posthumously inducted into the Rock and Roll Hall of Fame alongside Hynde, Farndon and Chambers as a member of the Pretenders.

== Discography ==
- 1974 – Fall of Hyperion – Robert John Godfrey (as Jim Scott)
- 1979 – Place Your Bets – Tommy Morrison

The Pretenders

- 1979 – Pretenders
- 1981 – Extended Play
- 1981 – Pretenders II

== Sources ==
- Austin Chronicle, Sept 26, 1982, Stephen Doster—Working Class Hero, by Andy Langer, accessed 23 July 2006 at
- Guitar Player, April 1981, The Pretenders James Honeyman-Scott, by Jas Obrecht accessed 3 July 2006, at
- Guitar Player, January 1990, Guitar Hero Johnny Marr: The Smiths and Beyond, by Joe Gore, accessed 3 July 2006, at
- Dantzig Design Group, 2006, "James Honeyman-Scott of the Pretenders." Hamer Unofficial Artist Archives. Accessed 30 July 2006, at
- IO Productions, Inc., undated, Interview with Victor de Lorenzo, by "Gaignaire" as part of MusiCalifornia radio program. Transcript accessed 8 July 2006 at
- Melody Maker, 17 February 1979, Say a Prayer for the Pretenders, by Mark Williams.
- New Musical Express, 26 January 1980, Only a Hobo Only a Star, by Paul Morley.
- Rhino Entertainment Company, 2006, This is Pirate Radio, by Ben Edmonds. Pirate Radio Box Set booklet.
- Uncut, June 1999, Rock and Roll Heart (Pretenders Special), by Allan Jones, pp. 46–65.
- Washington DC City Paper, 3 February 1984, Hynde Sight, by Michazil Yockel, accessed 4 July 2006, at
- Angel Air Records: Verden Allen Interview: Page 7 1999, accessed 6 December 2011 at
