= Martin Chambers =

English musician

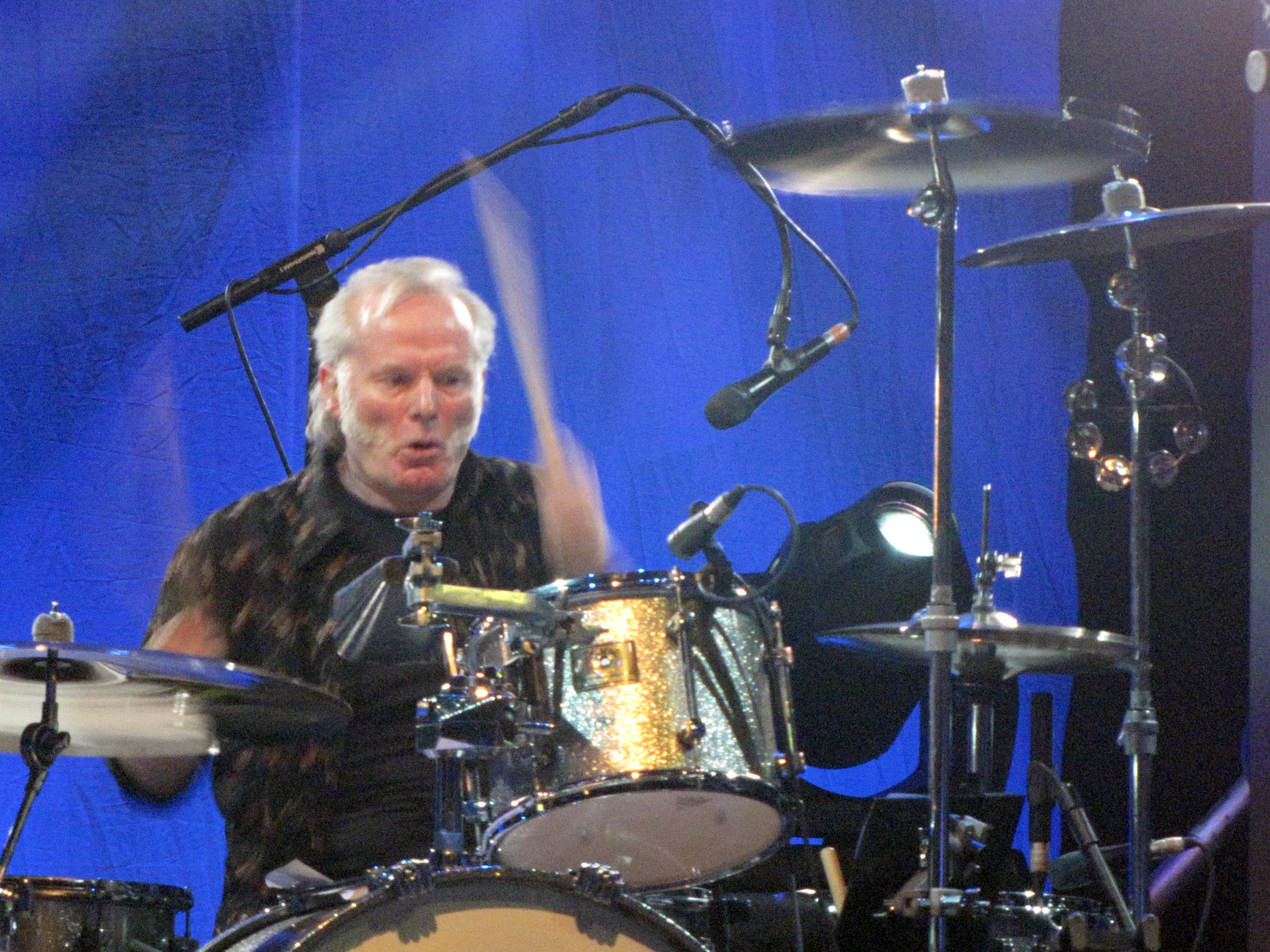

Background information
- Born: Martin Dale Chambers; 4 September 1951 (age 75); Hereford, Herefordshire, England
- Genres: Rock; new wave
- Occupations: Musician; songwriter
- Instruments: Drums; vocals
- Label: Sire
- Member of: The Pretenders

Martin Dale Chambers (born 4 September 1951) is an English musician, best known as a founding member and drummer of the rock band The Pretenders, for whom he has served three separate tenures.

== Career ==
Chambers began playing drums at about age 16 and was self-taught. In the mid-1970s, he played in a band called Cheeks with future Pretenders bandmate James Honeyman-Scott and former Mott the Hoople member Verden Allen. By 1978, Chambers was working as a driving instructor in Tufnell Park, London, where he had a job with the British School of Motoring. He joined The Pretenders later that year.

Chambers remained with The Pretenders during their period of greatest success in the early 1980s. The band cancelled a tour in the United States and Canada in late 1981 when Chambers suffered a serious injury to his hand. The Pretenders experienced turmoil in 1982-83 when guitarist Honeyman-Scott and bassist Pete Farndon both died from drug overdoses, leaving Chambers and group leader Chrissie Hynde as the only two members. Chambers and Hynde carried on with new members, but Chambers had trouble maintaining his enthusiasm for the band. He was fired by Hynde during the recording sessions for the album Get Close in 1986 and only played on one song. Hynde at first claimed that Chambers's playing was unsatisfactory, but later accepted that he was still traumatized by the deaths of Honeyman-Scott and Farndon.

In 1994, Hynde invited Chambers to rejoin the band for the recording of the album Last of the Independents, and he played on the band's two following studio albums. During the sessions for the album Break Up the Concrete in 2008, tensions again arose between Chambers and Hynde, who believed that his playing style was inappropriate for her recent songs. Chambers recommended that the album be recorded with session drummer Jim Keltner, but he played with the band during the ensuing tour.

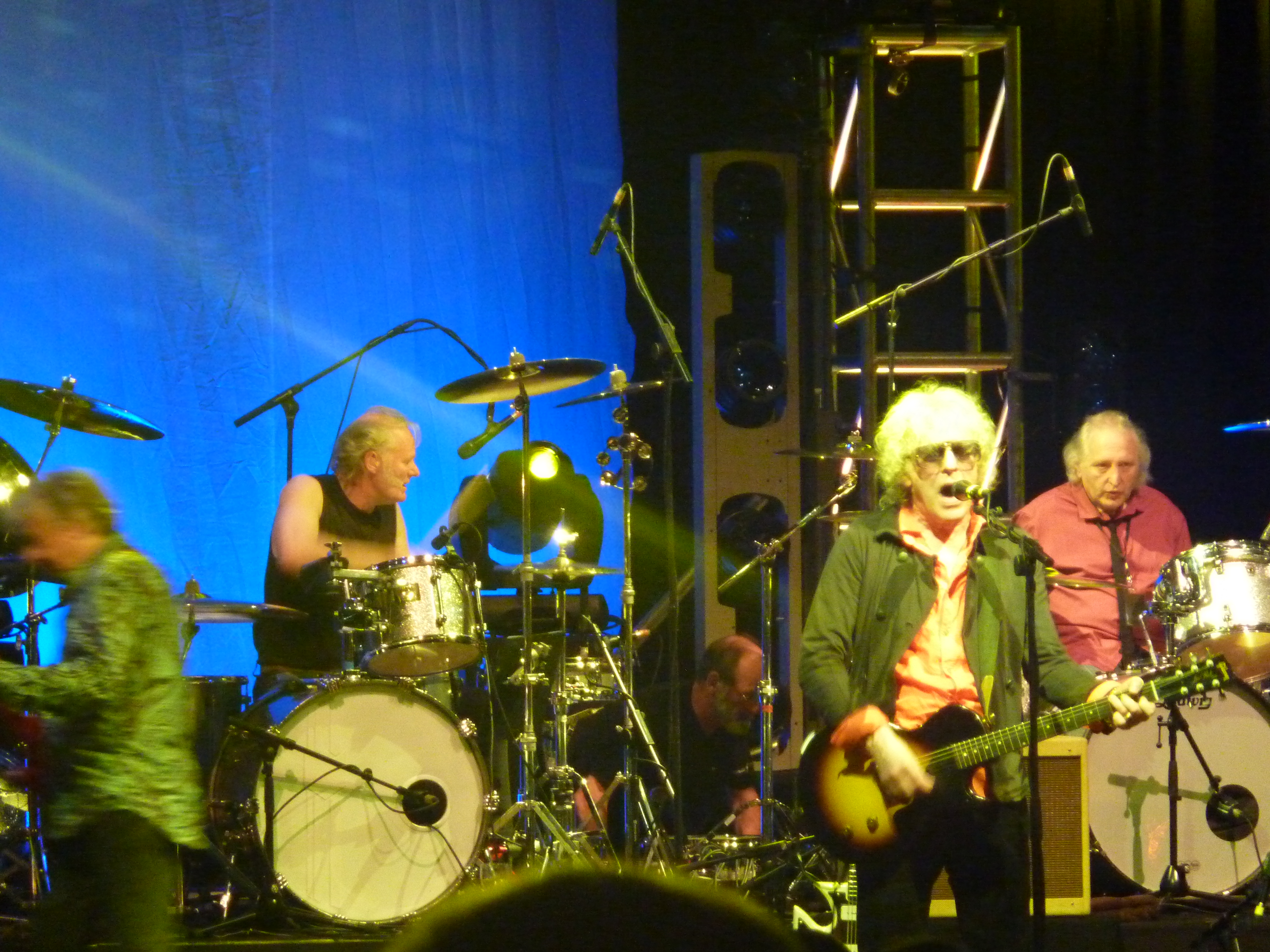
Chambers (second from left) with Mott the Hoople in 2009

In 2009, Chambers played seven shows with Mott the Hoople during their reunion tour, filling in for the band's drummer Dale Griffin, who was ill and loaned Chambers his drum kit. Chambers played drums on the Razorlight album Olympus Sleeping in 2018. He rejoined the Pretenders yet again for the 2020 album Hate for Sale, but has not appeared with the band since.

== Discography ==
- 1979 – Pretenders
- 1980 – “A Swift One”, on the Miniatures (A Sequence Of Fifty-One Tiny Masterpieces Edited By Morgan-Fisher) compilation
- 1981 – Extended Play
- 1981 – Pretenders II
- 1984 – Learning to Crawl
- 1986 – Get Close (track 11)
- 1994 – Last of the Independents (tracks 3, 4, 6 & 12)
- 1999 – Viva el Amor
- 2002 – Loose Screw
- 2009 – Hammersmith Live (with Mott the Hoople)
- 2020 – Hate for Sale
