= The Singles (Pretenders album) =

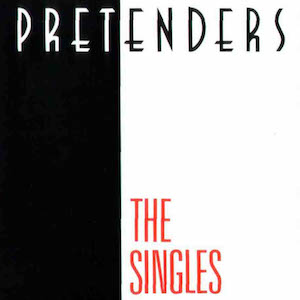

Compilation album by the Pretenders
- Released: 26 October 1987
- Recorded: 1979–1986
- Genre: Rock
- Length: 57:18
- Label: WEA; Sire
- Producer: Bob Clearmountain; Ray Falconer; Jimmy Iovine; Nick Lowe; Chris Thomas; UB40

The Pretenders chronology
Get Close (1986)	The Singles (1987)	Packed! (1990)

Professional ratings
Review scores
Source	Rating
AllMusic	5/5 stars
Chicago Tribune	4/4 stars
Robert Christgau	A
New Musical Express	9/10
The Rolling Stone Album Guide	4.5/5 stars

The Singles is the Pretenders' 1987 compilation album and features all the band's UK single hits to that date, as well as including "I Got You Babe", which Chrissie Hynde had performed with UB40 in 1985. The album reached No. 69 in the US album chart and No. 6 in the UK.

== Track listing ==
All tracks are written by Chrissie Hynde, except where noted.

No.	Title	Writer(s)	Original album	Length
1.	"Stop Your Sobbing"	Ray Davies	Pretenders (1980)	2:37
2.	"Kid"		Pretenders	3:05
3.	"Brass in Pocket"	Hynde; James Honeyman-Scott	Pretenders	3:04
4.	"Talk of the Town" (single version)		Extended Play and Pretenders II (1981)	3:12
5.	"I Go to Sleep"	Davies	Pretenders II	2:55
6.	"Day After Day" (single version)	Hynde; Honeyman-Scott	Pretenders II	4:01
7.	"Message of Love"		Extended Play and Pretenders II	3:24
8.	"Back on the Chain Gang"		Learning to Crawl (1984)	3:50
9.	"Middle of the Road"		Learning to Crawl	4:12
10.	"2000 Miles"		Learning to Crawl	3:38
11.	"Show Me"		Learning to Crawl	4:07
12.	"Thin Line Between Love and Hate"	Jackie Members; Richard Poindexter; Robert Poindexter	Learning to Crawl	3:39
13.	"Don't Get Me Wrong"		Get Close (1986)	3:48
14.	"Hymn to Her" (single edit)	Meg Keene	Get Close	4:28
15.	"My Baby"		Get Close	4:07
16.	"I Got You Babe" (UB40 featuring Chrissie Hynde)	Sonny Bono	Baggariddim (1985)	3:11

== Charts ==
Chart (1987/88)	Peak position
Australia (Kent Music Report)	19
US Billboard Album Chart	69
UK Album Chart	6

2025 weekly chart performance for The Singles
Chart (2025)	Peak position
Hungarian Physical Albums (MAHASZ)	28

== Certifications and sales ==
Region	Certification	Certified units/sales
France (SNEP)	Gold	100,000^{*}
New Zealand (RMNZ)	Platinum	15,000^{^}
Spain (PROMUSICAE)	Platinum	100,000^{^}
United Kingdom (BPI)	3× Platinum	900,000^{^}
United States (RIAA)	Gold	500,000^{^}
^{*} Sales figures based on certification alone.^{^} Shipments figures based on certification alone.
