= Packed! =

Studio album by Pretenders
- Released: 14 May 1990
- Studios: AIR Studios (London); Mayfair Studios (London); Abbey Road Studios (London); Sunset Sound Factory (Los Angeles)
- Genres: Alternative rock; new wave
- Length: 38:38
- Labels: Sire; WEA Records
- Producer: Mitchell Froom

Pretenders chronology
The Singles (1987)	Packed! (1990)	Last of the Independents (1994)

Singles from Packed!
- 1. "Never Do That" Released: May 1990; 2. "Sense of Purpose" Released: October 1990

Packed! is the fifth studio album by rock group Pretenders, released in 1990.

Besides band leader Chrissie Hynde, no other person is pictured anywhere within the album package. At the time the album was recorded, the only other remaining official member from the band's previous album was drummer Blair Cunningham, who plays on all tracks, though he is not credited as part of the band. As all other musicians appearing on the album are session musicians, some observers have characterized the album as a Hynde solo recording using the Pretenders name to satisfy contractual obligations. However, the lineup that recorded the album has some consistency with past studio lineups of the band: guitarist Billy Bremner, who had previously played with the band as a session musician on their "Back on the Chain Gang"/"My City Was Gone" single, appears on most of the tracks, as does bassist John McKenzie, who had played some bass on the band's previous studio album, Get Close (1986).

Professional ratings
Review scores
Source	Rating
AllMusic	2/5 stars
Chicago Tribune	3/4 stars
Robert Christgau	A−
Entertainment Weekly	B−
Los Angeles Times	3/5 stars
Rolling Stone	4/5 stars
Trouser Press	(mixed)

== Track listing ==
All songs by Chrissie Hynde, except where noted.

1. "Never Do That" – 3:20
2. "Let's Make a Pact" – 3:18
3. "Millionaires" – 3:04
4. "May This Be Love" (Jimi Hendrix) – 2:43
5. "No Guarantee" – 3:47
6. "When Will I See You" (Hynde, Johnny Marr) – 4:53
7. "Sense of Purpose" – 3:03
8. "Downtown (Akron)" – 2:43
9. "How Do I Miss You" – 4:21
10. "Hold a Candle to This" – 3:37
11. "Criminal" – 3:49

== Personnel ==
- Chrissie Hynde – guitar (1–3, 5–11), vocals (1–11), backing vocals (6, 7)
- Blair Cunningham – drums (1–11), backing vocals (1, 8)

Additional personnel

- Billy Bremner – guitar (1–6, 8, 9, 11), backing vocals (1, 3, 8)
- John McKenzie – bass guitar (2, 5, 6, 8, 10, 11), backing vocals (8)
- Mitchell Froom – keyboards (2, 4–6, 9, 11)
- Dominic Miller – guitar (7, 10), bass guitar and backing vocals (7)
- Tchad Blake – guitar (4,5)
- David Rhodes – guitar (3, 11)
- Will MacGregor – bass guitar and backing vocals (1)
- Tony "Gad" Robinson – bass guitar and backing vocals (9)
- Duane Delano Verh – bass guitar (4)
- Tim Finn – backing vocals (6)
- Mark Hart – backing vocals (6)
- Teo Miller – backing vocals (3)
- Adey Wilson – backing vocals (3)

Technical

- Mitchell Froom – producer
- Tchad Blake – engineer
- Geoff Foster, Rob Jaczko, Teo Miller – studio assistants
- Jill Furmanovsky – photography

== Charts ==
Chart performance for Packed!
Chart (1990)	Peak position
Australian Albums (ARIA)	55
Dutch Albums (Album Top 100)	43
German Albums (Offizielle Top 100)	48
New Zealand Albums (RMNZ)	31
Norwegian Albums (VG-lista)	15
Swedish Albums (Sverigetopplistan)	7
UK Albums (Official Charts)	19
US Billboard 200	48
