= Charly Arnolt =

American broadcaster and media personality

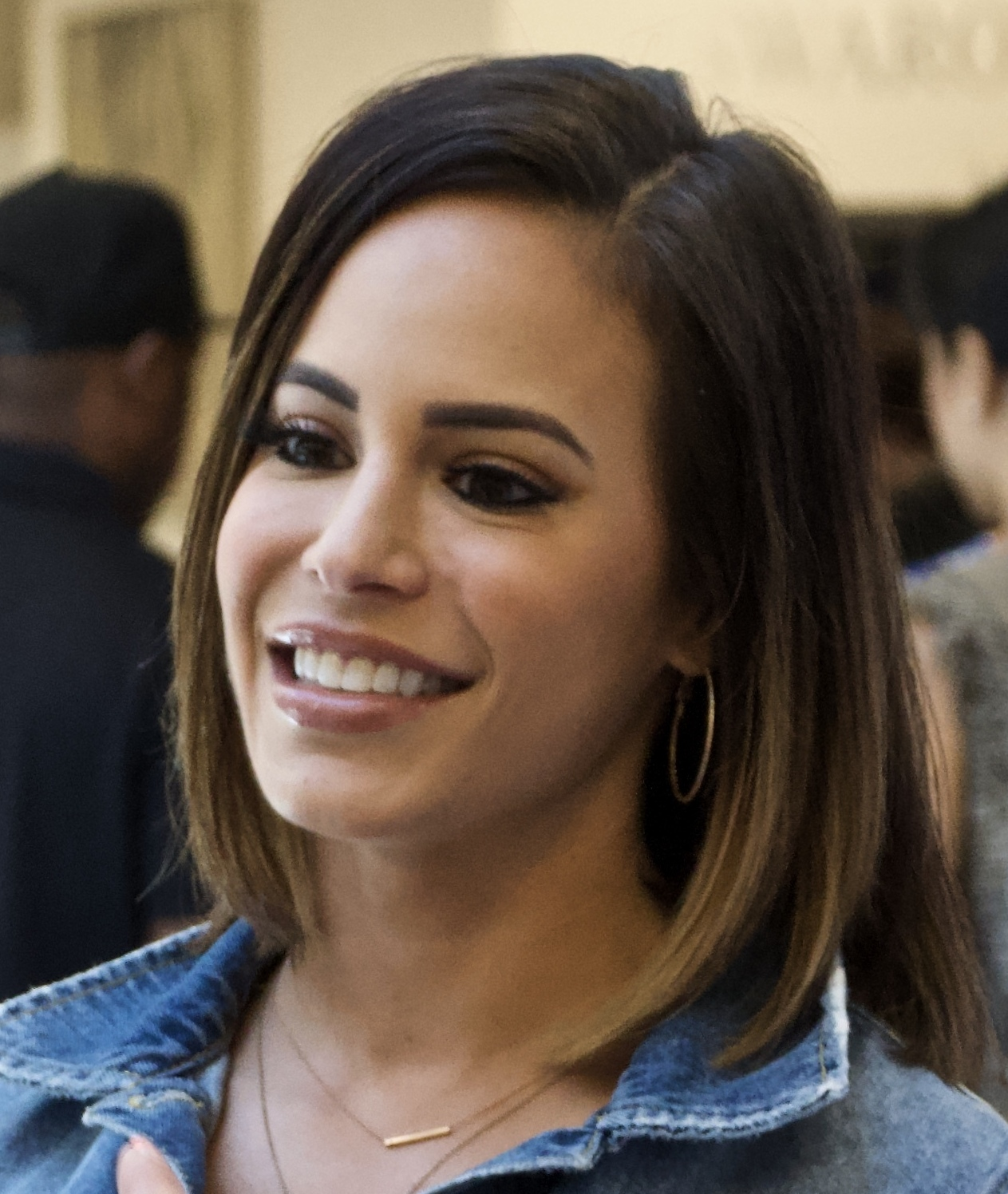
- Arnolt in 2018
- Born: Charly Arnolt; July 14, 1987 (age 39); Indianapolis, Indiana, U.S.
- Education: American University
- Occupations: Sportscaster, television personality
- Years active: 2010–present
- Employer: OutKick
- Professional wrestling career
- Ring name: Charly Caruso
- Billed height: 5 ft 2 in (157 cm)
- Debut: 2016
- Retired: 2021
- Website: charlyarnolt.com

Charly Arnolt (born July 14, 1987) is an American sports broadcaster and television personality for the multimedia platform OutKick. She is a cage side announcer for the UFC, previously known for her tenure as a sportscaster and backstage interviewer with WWE from 2016 to 2021, where she appeared under the ring name Charly Caruso. She was a backup host and moderator on ESPN's First Take with Stephen A. Smith and Molly Qerim, but in April 2023, left ESPN and joined the Clay Travis founded sports, news, and politics platform OutKick.

== Early life and education ==
Arnolt was born in Indianapolis, Indiana. She is Italian American. Arnolt developed a love for sports as a child, and began playing softball, volleyball, and gymnastics. She had hopes of going to the Olympics as a gymnast, but retired from the sport due to injuries. She also had aspirations of playing volleyball at a collegiate level, but was hindered because of her height.

In 2010, Arnolt graduated summa cum laude from American University with a degree in broadcast journalism. She previously attended North Central High School.

== Career ==
=== Early journalism career ===
In 2010, she joined WSAZ-TV as a reporter in Huntington, West Virginia. Arnolt later moved back to Indianapolis to work as a freelance reporter for WXIN "Fox 59". In 2011, she moved to WDAF-TV "Fox 4" in Kansas City, Missouri. where she worked for about two years. In 2014, she returned to WXIN where she became a sports reporter and anchor.

=== WWE (2016–2021) ===
Arnolt was invited by friend, NFL Jacksonville Jaguars and future All Elite Wrestling co-owner Tony Khan to a WWE SmackDown show in Indianapolis in 2016. At that show, Arnolt met WWE Senior Director of Talent Relations Mark Carrano, who connected her with WWE Monday Night Raw play-by-play commentator Michael Cole who is instrumental in hiring TV broadcasters and ring announcers for the company. Cole was very interested, but there were no openings. When Brandi Rhodes opted to leave WWE in May 2016, a door opened, and Arnolt joined WWE. She adopted the name Charly Caruso and debuted as a ring announcer for WWE NXT in 2016, but it didn't take long for her to make the main roster, interviewing WWE superstars and hosting events, segments and shows across WWE's platforms, including USA Network, WWE Network, YouTube and social media. She hosted pre-show panels and conducted backstage interviews on Monday Night RAW and WWE NXT until 2021, when she did not re-sign a new contract with WWE.

=== ESPN ===
Charly joined ESPN in September 2018. She provided updates on SportsCenter and hosted SportsCenter show on Snapchat. A couple of months later, she hosted First Take for the first time after someone in the talent department asked her what she wanted to do at the network if she had her choice. After she made a favorable impression in late December 2018 she received more opportunities to First Take and cemented her role as the primary fill in host.

Arnolt was also part of the First Take, Her Take podcast on ESPN. The weekly show, which also featured Kimberley Martin and Elle Duncan, had the same format as the television show. The podcast allowed all three of them to discuss other topics about their lives and culture.

Arnolt additionally also regularly appeared on SportsNation on ESPN+ as well as other shows on the streaming service, although she acknowledged that it had been difficult to make sure there was no conflict between her WWE and ESPN schedules. She completed her move from the WWE to ESPN.

Arnolt debuted as a fight interviewer at UFC on ESPN: dos Anjos vs. Fiziev on July 9, 2022.

On April 27, 2024, she became the first female ring announcer in UFC history, temporarily replacing Joe Martínez, who was reportedly ill.

=== OutKick ===
In April 2023, Arnolt left ESPN and joined Clay Travis founded sports, news, and right-wing politics multimedia platform OutKick, saying "Cancel culture doesn’t exist here. I speak freely".
