= OutKick =

American sports news website

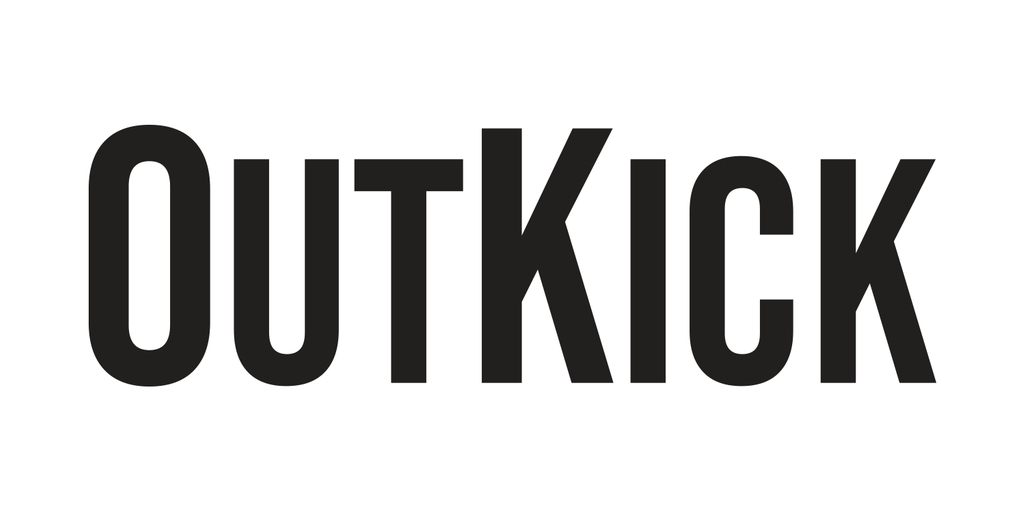
- Type: Sports news
- Format: Online
- Owner: Fox News Media
- Founder: Clay Travis
- Editor: Gary Schreier
- Staff writers: Clay Travis, Tomi Lahren, Dan Dakich,Trey Wallace, Armando Salguero, Bobby Burack, David Hookstead, Joe Kinsey, Alejandro Avila, Geoff Clark, Tyrus
- Founded: 2011; 15 years ago
- Political alignment: Right-wing
- Language: English
- City: Nashville, Tennessee
- Country: United States
- Website: www.foxnews.com/outkick

OutKick is an American sports and commentary website owned by Fox News Media. Founded by Clay Travis in 2011, the site features news, opinion pieces, and podcasts surrounding sports and popular culture from a conservative perspective.

After having already been involved in cross-promotions and syndication deals with its Fox Sports division, Travis sold OutKick Media to Fox Corporation in 2021. Travis remained head of the site until 2026, when he stepped down upon its full integration into the Fox News Digital division.

== History ==
=== Founding ===
The site was founded in 2011 by Clay Travis as OutKick the Coverage (OKTC). In 2013, Travis entered into an agreement to license OKTC to Fox Sports, with its posts being syndicated as part of FoxSports.com content, and the site being cross-promoted as a Fox College Football blog. In 2015, after having joined Fox Sports 1 as a contributor to its college football coverage, Travis signed an overall deal with Fox Sports that included television, radio, and digital roles, and a renewal of its licensing agreement for OutKick the Coverage. On September 6, 2016, Fox Sports Radio premiered OutKick the Coverage with Clay Travis as its new morning drive show.

In June 2020, Jason Whitlock, an ex-Fox Sports host, joined the company. As part of an accompanying rebranding, the site's title was also shortened to simply OutKick. Despite buying a one-third stake in the company when he joined, Whitlock quickly entered a feud with the other two owners, Travis and Sam Savage, as Savage had been with the company at the start, and as such never "purchased" a stake in the company. Whitlock spent $500,000 for his stake. Whitlock argued that Savage was not putting his "sweat" into the company, and issued an ultimatum: either Savage invests $500,000 into the company, or he will leave. This investment never came and Whitlock left OutKick in early 2021.

=== Fox acquisition ===
On May 6, 2021, Fox Sports' parent company Fox Corporation announced that it would acquire OutKick Media for an undisclosed amount; Travis stated that the sale would help to "further [accelerate] the growth of our audience". Variety assessed OutKick as having similarities in content and audience to Barstool Sports, which also saw a massive increase in internet popularity from 2020 to 2021. On May 27, 2021, Travis announced that he would leave the OutKick radio show to host The Clay Travis and Buck Sexton Show, a conservative talk radio show with Premiere Networks being billed as a successor to The Rush Limbaugh Show.

The website hired social media personality Tomi Lahren as a new personality to host its afternoon opinion talk-show in June 2022.

After its acquisition by Fox, OutKick grew from 10 employees prior to the acquisition to over 50, and opened a new larger office in Nashville in March 2023.

On July 31, 2023, Fox News streaming service Fox Nation began to carry OutKick video content, including episodes of its shows OutKick The Show, Tomi Lahren Is Fearless and Gaines For Girls following their premieres on OutKick and YouTube.

On January 25, 2024, it was announced that wrestler Tyrus—a Fox News contributor and regular panelist on its talk show Gutfeld!—would helm a new show for the platform entitled Maintaining with Tyrus. As of 2024, OutKick's annual revenue was estimated at somewhere between $345,000 and $620,000. In September 2025, Travis revealed on the OutKick The Show podcast that an OutKick television series would premiere on Fox Sports 1 "in a couple of weeks". The weekly series—titled Outkick The Show with Clay Travis—premiered on September 17.

In June 2026, Travis announced that he would step down from his role as head of OutKick, as the site began to be brought directly under the Fox News Digital division. Travis will continue to serve as a Fox News contributor under a multi-year contract, and continue to host OutKick the Show on FS1. The integration took effect on August 24, 2026, with the site introducing a new logo, as well as new content verticals such as OutKick Outdoors, and OutKick Dropkick for professional wrestling coverage, On August 18, Fox News Digital announced that it had signed former WFAN morning host Craig Carton to host the podcast The Craig Carton Show, which will air new episodes on Mondays, Wednesdays, and Fridays.

After leaving OutKick, Travis would launch a new, similar outlet known as Sport & State in partnership with iHeartMedia, encompassing The Clay Travis and Buck Sexton Show and other new daily programming.

== Content ==
OutKick features news and opinion articles relating to sports, pop culture, and sports betting.

OutKick describes itself as being a conservative alternative to mainstream sports news outlets that serve the "elite, left-leaning minority instead of the American sports fan", and stated that it aimed to "[expose] the destructive nature of ‘woke’ activism". with Travis having cited an alleged left-wing bias by ESPN in its reporting on Michael Sam (the first openly gay player to be drafted to an NFL team) and U.S. national anthem protests as examples. Media Matters for America has cited examples of OutKick personalities discussing conservative talking points such as the litter boxes in schools hoax, criticism of women's sports leagues such as the WNBA, and anti-LGBTQ rhetoric (including opposition to transgender women in women's sports).
