= Learning to Crawl =

Studio album by the Pretenders
- Released: 13 January 1984
- Recorded: Mid-1982 to late 1983
- Studio: AIR Studios (London)
- Genres: New wave; alternative rock
- Length: 39:21
- Label: Sire
- Producer: Chris Thomas

The Pretenders chronology
Pretenders II (1981)	Learning to Crawl (1984)	Get Close (1986)

Singles from Learning to Crawl
- 1. "Back on the Chain Gang" Released: 17 September 1982; 2. "2000 Miles" Released: 18 November 1983 (UK); 3. "Middle of the Road" Released: November 1983 (US); 4. "Show Me" Released: March 1984 (US); 5. "Thin Line Between Love and Hate" Released: 25 May 1984

Learning to Crawl is the third studio album by the British rock band the Pretenders. It was released on 13 January 1984 by Sire Records after a hiatus during which band members James Honeyman-Scott and Pete Farndon died of drug overdoses. The album's title of "Learning to Crawl" was given in honour of Chrissie Hynde's then-infant daughter, Natalie Rae Hynde. She was learning to crawl at the time that Hynde was trying to determine a title for the album.

Learning to Crawl was a critical and commercial success, reaching number 11 on the UK Albums Chart. In the United States, it peaked at number five on the Billboard 200, making it the band's highest-charting album in the US.

== Production ==
After Pete Farndon's dismissal from the band and James Honeyman-Scott's death, Chrissie Hynde and Martin Chambers initially recruited Rockpile's Billy Bremner and Big Country's Tony Butler to fill in a caretaker line-up of the band in 1982. Bremner played guitar and Butler played bass on the band's September 1982 single "Back on the Chain Gang" and its B-side "My City Was Gone", both songs which were later included on Learning to Crawl. As the album sessions got underway, Bremner, Graham Parker's bassist Andrew Bodnar, and Paul Carrack (formerly of Squeeze, Ace and Roxy Music) played guitar, bass and piano respectively for the track "Thin Line Between Love and Hate".

Finally, Robbie McIntosh (guitar) and Malcolm Foster (bass guitar) were recruited to join Hynde and Chambers, and the band was now officially a quartet. It was this line-up that recorded the rest of the tracks featured on Learning to Crawl.

The November 1983 single "2000 Miles" was the newly reconstituted foursome's first release, followed shortly by the full Learning to Crawl studio album in January 1984.

== Song origins ==
Hynde noted in the booklet for the expanded edition of Learning to Crawl that guitarist Robbie McIntosh came up with the opening guitar riff for "2000 Miles". She stated that she probably should have credited McIntosh as co-writer of the song. "2000 Miles" became a popular Christmas song in the UK. The lyrics are a tale of two lovers apart during Christmastime.

In "I Hurt You", dubbing was used to overlap two lead vocal parts with conflicting melodies and emotional pitches in order to express the narrator's tangled emotions.

"My City Was Gone" is largely an autobiographical song written about the changes that Hynde observed when she went back to her native city of Akron, Ohio. The instrumental introduction of the song would later be adopted as the theme of the EIB Network radio brand, originally Rush Limbaugh and later Clay Travis and Buck Sexton.

"Thumbelina" is a country rock song about a mother and daughter traveling across America, with the last line suggesting that the mother is leaving her husband.

"Watching the Clothes" was an older song written before the band's debut album. Hynde was inspired to write the song after a close friend died.

== Critical reception ==
Professional ratings
Review scores
Source	Rating
AllMusic	5/5 stars
Chicago Tribune	3.5/4 stars
Mojo	4/5 stars
Pitchfork	8.7/10
PopMatters	10/10
Rolling Stone	4/5 stars
The Rolling Stone Album Guide	5/5 stars
Spin Alternative Record Guide	8/10
Uncut	8/10
The Village Voice	A−

In a February 1984 review for Rolling Stone, Kurt Loder hailed Learning to Crawl as "a triumph of art over adversity" which "achieves a professional rebirth that seemed uncertain as recently as a few months ago." Praising Hynde as "the most unaffectedly personal of contemporary singer/songwriters, and surely the most astringently intimate lyricist working within a real rock & roll context", Loder stated that "if this third Pretenders album lacks the sense of revelation, of a new voice being heard, that so distinguished the group's first LP, the insights here are deeper, the wisdom harder won." "Chrissie the fuck-off queen always had these humanistic attitudes in her," The Village Voice's Robert Christgau wrote, "and it's good to hear her make the thin line between love and hate explicit."

Retrospectively, AllMusic critic Mark Deming deemed Learning to Crawl "a masterpiece" distinguished by the emotional resonance and "gravity" of Hynde's lyrics, which "blended with her tough but wiry melodic sense and streetwise intelligence to create a set of truly remarkable tunes." Elizabeth Nelson of Pitchfork described the album as Hynde's attempt to reconcile her "intuitive, if sublimated, strand of compassion" with her "thorough cynicism", likening it to John Lennon's "dissociative classic" Imagine (1971) "with its surfeit of runaway hooks, its working-class rage, its ad-hoc penchant for insult comedy, and its communion with the idea of genuine human understanding".

== Track listing ==
All songs written by Chrissie Hynde, except where noted.

1. "Middle of the Road" – 4:08
2. "Back on the Chain Gang" – 3:44
3. "Time the Avenger" – 4:47
4. "Watching the Clothes" – 2:46
5. "Show Me" – 4:00
6. "Thumbelina" – 3:12
7. "My City Was Gone" – 5:14
8. "Thin Line Between Love and Hate" (Richard Poindexter, Robert Poindexter, Jackie Members) – 3:33
9. "I Hurt You" – 4:27
10. "2000 Miles" – 3:30

2007 re-release

11. "Fast or Slow (The Law's the Law)" (Martin Chambers) – 3:15
12. "Tequila" – 3:35
13. "I Hurt You" (Denmark Street demo, August 1982) – 4:06
14. "When I Change My Life" (Denmark Street demo, August 1982) – 4:43
15. "Ramblin' Rob" (Denmark Street demo, August 1982) (Robbie McIntosh) – 3:32
16. "My City Was Gone" (Live) – 4:53
17. "Money (That's What I Want)" (Live at US Festival, May 1983) (Berry Gordy Jr., Janie Bradford) – 4:39

== Personnel ==
The Pretenders

- Chrissie Hynde – lead vocals (all but "Fast or Slow" and "Ramblin' Rob"), rhythm guitars, harmonica [uncredited], backing vocals
- Robbie McIntosh – lead and rhythm guitars, backing vocals
- Malcolm Foster – bass guitar, backing vocals
- Martin Chambers – drums, backing vocals, lead vocals on "Fast or Slow", percussion

Additional personnel

- Billy Bremner – lead guitars on "Back on the Chain Gang" and "My City Was Gone", rhythm guitar and backing vocals on "Thin Line Between Love and Hate"
- Tony Butler – bass guitar on "Back on the Chain Gang" and "My City Was Gone", backing vocals on "Back on the Chain Gang"
- Andrew Bodnar – bass guitar and backing vocals on "Thin Line Between Love and Hate"
- Paul Carrack – piano and backing vocals on "Thin Line Between Love and Hate"
- Jeremy Allom – percussion (clanging hammer sound) on "Back On The Chain Gang"
- Steve Churchyard – engineer
- Peter Barrett – art direction
- Paul Cox – front cover photography

== Charts ==
Chart performance for Learning to Crawl
Chart (1984)	Peak Position
Australia (Kent Music Report)	18
Canada Top Albums/CDs (RPM)	4
UK Albums chart	11
Billboard 200	5

=== Year-end charts ===
Chart (1984)	Position
Canada RPM Top 100 Albums	17
US Billboard 200	30

== Certifications ==
Certifications for Learning to Crawl
Region	Certification	Certified units/sales
United Kingdom (BPI)	Gold	100,000^{^}
United States (RIAA)	Platinum	1,000,000^{^}
^{^} Shipments figures based on certification alone.
