= James Golden =

James Golden may refer to:

- James S. Golden (1891–1971), American politician
- James Golden (radio personality), a.k.a. Bo Snerdley, call screener and engineer for The Rush Limbaugh Show
