= Hymn to Her =

1987 single by the Pretenders

Single by the Pretenders

from the album Get Close
- B-side: "Room Full of Mirrors"
- Released: 1 December 1986
- Genre: Rock; folk; gospel
- Length: 4:27
- Label: Warner Music Group
- Songwriter: Meg Keene
- Producers: Jimmy Iovine, Bob Clearmountain

The Pretenders singles chronology
"Don't Get Me Wrong" (1986)	"Hymn to Her" (1986)	"My Baby" (1987)

"Hymn to Her" is a song that was first released from British rock band the Pretenders' fourth studio album, Get Close (1986). It was written by Meg Keene, a high school friend of Pretenders' lead singer Chrissie Hynde. "Hymn to Her" was released as a single in the UK and reached number eight on the UK Singles Chart. According to AllMusic critic Matthew Greenwald, the song has remained popular on adult contemporary radio stations.

== Critical reception ==
According to Spin magazine critic Erik Himmelsbach, "Hymn to Her" is one of the songs presenting "traditional pop sentiments" which Hynde and the Pretenders mixed in with their more vitriolic work. Spin critic Brian Cullman described it as a "hymn to the eternal feminine." The Maiden, Mother and Crone that are mentioned in the song are Archetypes of the collective unconscious, specific psychological imaging of the major psychological transitions women undergo over a lifetime. The Encyclopedia of Modern Witchcraft and Neo-Paganism interprets the song as containing pagan themes. Though the Archetypes of the collective unconscious are not limited to religious belief. Vic Garbarini of Musician magazine suggested that a theme of the song is Hynde "trying to listen to that part of [herself] where all [her] songs come from." Greenwald considers it "a timeless love song about a life-long love." According to Greenwald, the melody combines folk music and gospel music elements.

Cash Box said that it's "a poignant tribute to mothers and womanhood and is the rare non-Hynde composition." Spin's Cullman evaluated "Hymn to Her" as "a stunner" which combines "the spirit behind 'The Mists of Avalon' with the beauty of Sandy Denny's best work." Greenwald particularly praised the lyrics, Hynde's delivery, and the refrain. Ira Robbins and Delvin Neugebauer of Trouser Press described "Hymn To Her" as a "haunting ballad" that was one of the few worthy songs on Get Close. Author Barbara O'Dair described it as "glorious" and "spine-tingling" and "the best thing" on Get Close. The Encyclopedia of Modern Witchcraft and Neo-Paganism called it "enchanting."

== Recordings and features ==
"Hymn to Her" was later included on the Pretenders' compilation albums The Singles in 1987 and Greatest Hits in 2000. It was also included on the multi-artist compilation album Diana, Princess of Wales: Tribute in 1997. Sleeper covered the song as the b-side to "Vegas" and on the related EP in 1995.

== Charts ==
=== Weekly charts ===
Chart (1987)	Peak position
Australia (Kent Music Report)	7
Belgium (Ultratop 50 Flanders)	25
Europe (European Hot 100 Singles)	32
Ireland (IRMA)	8
Netherlands (Dutch Top 40)	35
Netherlands (Single Top 100)	38
New Zealand (Recorded Music NZ)	46
South Africa (Springbok Radio)	8
Sweden (Sverigetopplistan)	15
UK Singles (Official Charts)	8

=== Year-end charts ===
Chart (1987)	Position
Australia (Australian Music Report)	63

== Certifications ==
Certifications for Hymn to Her
Region	Certification	Certified units/sales
New Zealand (RMNZ)	Gold	15,000^{‡}
^{‡} Sales+streaming figures based on certification alone.
