= Streamlink =

Streamlink is a subscription-based service of Premiere Radio Networks for various programs such as Coast to Coast AM, The Rush Limbaugh Show, The Jim Rome Show and The Glenn Beck Program.

== Coast to Coast AM ==
The Coast to Coast version of the service allows users to listen to either live audio streams of a program, download each hour of choice of a show, normally four, or stream sampler audio clips of a program, usually three or four, which run from two to fifteen minutes a segment. It also allows listeners to join live chats of about an hour's length once or twice a month with host George Noory and/or a special guest, usually chosen from the show's guest roster, such as in advance of an appearance.

The MP3 segment downloads are available for three years, though select audio clips remain available indefinitely. They can be downloaded through either individually through an operating system's file-download functions (e.g. via right-click in Windows) from links off each program page or downloaded as podcasts through iTunes or for Microsoft Windows users a proprietary download program (available for Windows 98, Windows 2000, Windows ME, Windows XP, Mac OS X, and Windows Vista) called the Coast to Coast Media Center. (The last of these downloads at an apparently arbitrary time within one hour of internet connection following show availability the following day.)

Additional past shows are offered as a pair of weekly "Classic Shows" (accessible for two weeks effective each Monday), and additional replays are currently offered as "Somewhere in Time with Art Bell", Bell being the show's first host when it was known as the Art Bell Show.

The cost varies in increments based on subscription lengths of to encourage longer subscriptions but for at least the Coast to Coast version runs approximately $60 US for one year. Those wishing to purchase subscriptions who do not live in North America are unable make a purchase as their credit card payment will never be successful; interesting to note that any country can be selected, but the province selection is limited to Canada and the USA.

The size of the listening audience has also led to the creation of fan-based index sites such as ctcspotlight.com.

== The Rush Limbaugh Show ==
The service is also offered for The Rush Limbaugh Show as part of the show's online premium service, Rush 24/7. Subscribers to the service receive unlimited access to the show's website archives, the ability to watch Limbaugh host the show live on the "Dittocam," video podcasts of the Morning Update, and audio archives. Limbaugh also hosts, on occasion, a "Fourth Hour," which broadcasts to subscribers only and is completely freeform. Rush 24/7 supports Windows Media Flayer and Adobe Flash; support for RealPlayer was discontinued March 2011.
