= My Baby (Pretenders song) =

Single by the Pretenders

from the album Get Close and The Singles
- B-side: "Tradition of Love (Extended Remix)"
- Released: January 1987 (US); 9 March 1987 (UK)
- Genre: Rock, jangle pop
- Length: 4:07
- Label: Sire
- Songwriter(s): Chrissie Hynde
- Producer(s): Jimmy Iovine, Bob Clearmountain

"My Baby" is a song written by Chrissie Hynde that was originally released on the Pretenders 1986 album Get Close. "My Baby" was included on the Pretenders' 1987 compilation album The Singles.

== Background ==
"My Baby" is a love song to Hynde's baby daughter. Vic Garbarini of Musician magazine also suggested that the song is about the baby within Hynde herself, in the sense of "something being born" into a "new life. Allmusic critic Matthew Greenwald describes the acoustic guitar melody that begins the song as sounding like an Irish folk song. He describes the rest of the melody as having a "folk-rock groove," applying a two-chord pattern that he describes as "ingenious." He describes the lyrics as Hynde expressing her "near-overflowing affection in her literate, conversational style."

== Reception ==
Cash Box said that with this single "Chrissie Hynde exhibits her great growth as a writer and interpretive singer." SPIN Magazine described the song as "gorgeous," and described Hynde's lead vocal as possessing "the goofy tenderness of someone who is too smart to walk around showing baby pictures, but who is too giddy to resist." Elizabeth Wurtzel wrote in New York Magazine that, like "Don't Get Me Wrong," "My Baby" "could have sounded gushy," but instead became a representation of "a life lived hard that at least approximated some precarious version of settledness." Ira Robbins and Delvin Neugebauer of Trouser Press described "My Baby" as a "sentimental love song" that was one of the few worthy songs on Get Close.

== Chart performance ==
"My Baby" was released as a single in the U.S., achieving modest success on the Billboard Hot 100, peaking at #64 and #75 on the Cashbox Top 100. It achieved far greater success on the Mainstream Rock chart, spending two weeks at #1, following up on "Don't Get Me Wrong," an earlier single from Get Close which also reached #1 on the Mainstream Rock chart. "My Baby" however, only reached #84 on the UK charts. It was slightly more successful in Australia and New Zealand, where it peaked at #56 and #50 respectively.
