= Show Me (Pretenders song) =

Single by the Pretenders

from the album Learning to Crawl
- B-side: "Fast or Slow (The Law's the Law)"
- Released: 1984
- Genre: Rock
- Length: 4:08
- Label: Sire
- Songwriter(s): Chrissie Hynde
- Producer(s): Chris Thomas

The Pretenders singles chronology
"Middle of the Road" (1983)	"Show Me" (1984)	"Thin Line Between Love and Hate" (1984)

"Show Me" is a song written by Chrissie Hynde and first recorded by British rock band the Pretenders for their 1984 album Learning to Crawl. It was released in 1984 as the fourth single from the album, reaching No. 28 on the Billboard Hot 100 and No. 8 on the Billboard Top Rock Tracks chart. It was not released as a single in the UK.

== Composition ==
The song is from the perspective of a first-time mother fondly addressing her newborn child, introducing the child to the world while also expressing a desire to find love in their relationship.

== Reception ==
Stewart Mason of AllMusic describes the song as "something of a rewrite of the earlier, better single 'Kid'" and "A heartfelt love song to Chrissie Hynde's then-newborn in the wake of her separation from the child's father, the Kinks' Ray Davies". He praised the song for avoiding sentimentality and cliché in its approach to the subject matter, and for Robbie McIntosh's lengthy and expressive guitar solo at the end.

Mother Jones writer Ariel Swartley felt that the song showed Hynde as being more fiery yet more compassionate in light of her newborn child, with lines like "Welcome to a special place/In a heart of stone that's cold and grey/You with your angel face/Show me the meaning of the word." Swartley explained that Hynde is looking for her baby to show her the meaning of the word "love", and in a way that is "selfless, nonhorny, overpowering" in a way that is atypical of the use of the word love in rock songs.

Washington Post writer Joe Sasfy considered "Show Me" to be a "stunning pop song" and a "somewhat uncharacteristic, at least for Hynde, [expression] of the value of love and hope." Akron Beacon Journal reporter Glenn Gamboa called in a "gorgeous love song" in which Hynde characteristically combines good and bad by incorporating lines such as "Welcome to the human race, with its wars, disease, and brutality". Journal Times critic Len LaCare similarly said that "Hynde's tunes pack layers of meaning and emotion into a hard-edged, bare-bones package of guitar riffs and unadorned drum beats." Hynde biographer Adam Sobsey regarded "Show Me" as one of her most undervalued songs. Ultimate Classic Rock critic Bryan Wawzenek rated it as a "mid-tempo classic." Hynde praised Martin Chambers's "expert handling" of the drumming on the song.

== Charts ==
Chart (1984)	Peak position
US Billboard Hot 100	28
US Top Rock Tracks (Billboard)	8
