= Don't Get Me Wrong =

1986 single by the Pretenders

- Artwork for UK and European vinyl releases

Single by the Pretenders

from the album Get Close
- B-side: "Dance!"
- Released: September 22, 1986
- Genre: Rock
- Length: 3:49
- Label: Real; Sire
- Songwriter: Chrissie Hynde
- Producers: Jimmy Iovine; Bob Clearmountain

The Pretenders singles chronology
"Thin Line Between Love and Hate" (1984)	"Don't Get Me Wrong" (1986)	"Hymn to Her" (1986)

Music video
- "Don't Get Me Wrong" on YouTube

"Don't Get Me Wrong" is a song by British rock band the Pretenders. It was the first single released from the band's fourth studio album, Get Close (1986). It was also included on the band's compilation album, The Singles (1987). Frontwoman Chrissie Hynde said she was inspired to write the song for her friend John McEnroe.

== Critical reception ==
Billboard wrote that although Hynde is the only original Pretender remaining, this song represents "a pretty upbeat, strutting, confident Pretenders." Cashbox praised Hynde's "sultry vocal" and "powerful songwriting." Classic rock review describes "Don't Get Me Wrong" as a "jaunty rock track". Ultimate Classic Rock critic Matt Wardlaw rated it the Pretenders' eighth-greatest song, saying that it "[hammers] home the point rather succinctly that when it comes to love from the female point of view, it's best to expect the unexpected."

== Chart performance ==
In the United States, "Don't Get Me Wrong" became the group's second top-10 hit on the Billboard Hot 100 chart, peaking at No. 10. It also spent three weeks atop the Billboard Album Rock Tracks chart in November 1986. In the United Kingdom, the song also peaked at No. 10 on the UK Singles Chart. In Australia, it became a top-10 hit, reaching No. 8 on the Kent Music Report.

== Music video ==
The music video for the song is a tribute to the British 1960s espionage television series The Avengers, with Chrissie Hynde playing Emma Peel searching for John Steed, while being diverted by body doubles and rival agents. She drives a 1983 Reliant Scimitar SS1. Steed actor Patrick Macnee appears in the original series' footage, with Hynde electronically inserted. Two edits to the video were made, the second edit adds alternate shots (including a scene of one of the body doubles being revealed to be a woman) and inserts footage of the band performing in a studio.

== Personnel ==
The Pretenders

- Chrissie Hynde – lead vocals, rhythm guitar
- Robbie McIntosh – guitars
- T. M. Stevens – bass guitar

Additional personnel

- Chucho Merchán – bass guitar
- Steve Jordan – drums, percussion
- Paul "Wix" Wickens – synthesizer, piano

== Charts ==
=== Weekly charts ===
Weekly chart performance for "Don't Get Me Wrong"
Chart (1986–1987)	Peak position
Australia (Kent Music Report)	8
Belgium (Ultratop 50 Flanders)	8
Canada Top Singles (RPM)	14
Europe (Eurochart Hot 100)	19
Ireland (IRMA)	4
Netherlands (Dutch Top 40)	19
Netherlands (Single Top 100)	25
New Zealand (Recorded Music NZ)	11
UK Singles (Official Charts)	10
US Billboard Hot 100	10
US Adult Contemporary (Billboard)	28
US Album Rock Tracks (Billboard)	1
West Germany (GfK)	45

=== Year-end charts ===
1986 year-end chart performance for "Don't Get Me Wrong"
Chart (1986)	Position
Belgium (Ultratop 50 Flanders)	95

1987 year-end chart performance for "Don't Get Me Wrong"
Chart (1987)	Position
US Billboard Hot 100	92

== Certifications ==
Certifications for "Don't Get Me Wrong"
Region	Certification	Certified units/sales
New Zealand (RMNZ)	Platinum	30,000^{‡}
Spain (Promusicae)	Gold	30,000^{‡}
United Kingdom (BPI)	Silver	200,000^{‡}
^{‡} Sales+streaming figures based on certification alone.
