= 2000 Miles =

Single by Pretenders

from the album Learning to Crawl
- B-side: "Fast or Slow (The Law's the Law)"
- Released: 18 November 1983
- Genre: Christmas; soft rock
- Length: 3:40
- Label: Real; Sire
- Songwriter: Chrissie Hynde
- Producer: Chris Thomas

Pretenders singles chronology
"My City Was Gone" (1982)	"2000 Miles" (1983)	"Middle of the Road" (1983)

Gatefold image
- Cover image of gatefold single release (Real ARE 20F)

Music video
- "2000 Miles" (Official Music Video) on YouTube

"2000 Miles" is a song by the British rock band Pretenders. Written by lead vocalist Chrissie Hynde and produced by Chris Thomas, it was released on 18 November 1983 as the second single from their third studio album, Learning to Crawl (1984). It was most popular in the UK, where it peaked at No. 15 on the UK Singles Chart in December 1983. In the US, it was released as the B-side of both the 7-inch single and 12-inch single remix of the band's hit "Middle of the Road".

Influenced by Otis Redding's "Thousand Miles Away", the song was written a year after the band's guitarist, James Honeyman-Scott, had died of a drug overdose in 1982. Hynde has noted that she thinks "the sense of distance in the lyrics" refers to Honeyman-Scott". Considered a Christmas song, it has been released on various Christmas compilation albums.

== Background ==
According to music critic Jon Pareles, the song is about missing a man at Christmastime. "Robbie McIntosh plays beautifully on '2000 Miles'," Hynde recalled. "Anything to avoid listening to my voice and my stupid words."

The song frequently reappears on the UK Singles Chart around Christmastime, staying in the charts for a few weeks over the Christmas period.

== Critical reception ==
Dave Marsh, in his 1989 book The Heart of Rock & Soul: The 1001 Greatest Singles Ever Made, ranked "2000 Miles"' as the 630th best rock or soul single to that date. It is one of four songs by Pretenders listed in the book. Ultimate Classic Rock critic Matt Wardlaw rated it the Pretenders’ 9th greatest song, calling it "one of the season's most beloved Christmas songs."

According to analysis of PRS for Music figures, it was estimated that the song generates £102,000 of royalties per year.

== Music video ==
The official video features Hynde dressed as a member of The Salvation Army in a snowy location. Chrissie Hynde also recorded a version of the song in 1995 with violins and other stringed instruments for The Isle of View album.

== Charts ==
Weekly chart performance for "2000 Miles"
Chart (1983–1984)	Peak position
Australia (Kent Music Report)	30
Belgium (Ultratop 50 Flanders)	11
Ireland (IRMA)	14
Netherlands (Dutch Top 40)	8
Netherlands (Single Top 100)	13
New Zealand (Recorded Music NZ)	36
UK Singles (Official Charts)	15

== Certifications ==
Certifications and sales for "2000 Miles"
Region	Certification	Certified units/sales
New Zealand (RMNZ)	Gold	15,000^{‡}
United Kingdom (BPI) Digital sales since 2004	Platinum	600,000^{‡}
^{‡} Sales+streaming figures based on certification alone.

== Cover versions ==
Canadian actress and singer Jill Hennessy, in character as Jordan Cavanaugh, performed "2000 Miles" in the last scene of "Blue Christmas," a December 2001 first-season episode of her NBC television series Crossing Jordan.

British rock band Coldplay released a piano cover of the song as a charity single in 2003. The track's digital download was available for £1.50 between 16 December 2003 and 1 January 2004, with all royalties being donated to Stop Handgun Violence and Future Forests.

KT Tunstall covered the song for her 2007 Christmas EP Sounds of the Season: The KT Tunstall Holiday Collection.

Smash Mouth's version appears on the 2012 reissue of their 2005 album The Gift of Rock; and indie rock band C-Clamp's rendition is on a 1998 compilation, The My Pal God Holiday Record.

American pop rock band Train covered the song on their 2015 holiday album Christmas in Tahoe. The same year, Australian singer Kylie Minogue covered the song for her first Christmas album, Kylie Christmas.

English singer Freya Skye released a cover version of the song in 2026 for Spotify Singles.
