= The Rush Limbaugh Show =

American talk radio show (1988–2021)

- Other names: The Rush Limbaugh Program; Rush Limbaugh on the EIB Network; Rush
- Genre: Conservative talk
- Running time: 3 hours (noon – 3 p.m. ET)
- Country of origin: United States
- Language: English
- Home station: KFBK, Sacramento (1984–1988); WABC, New York City (1988–2013); WJNO, West Palm Beach (2000–2021); WOR, New York City (2014–2021)
- Syndicates: Excellence In Broadcasting (EIB) Network (thru Premiere Networks and Westwood One)
- TV adaptations: Rush Limbaugh (1992–1996)
- Hosted by: Rush Limbaugh
- Starring: Rush Limbaugh
- Announcer: Johnny Donovan
- Created by: Rush Limbaugh
- Executive producer: Cookie Gleason
- Recording studio: Palm Beach County, Florida (1996–2021)
- Original release: 1984 (Sacramento); August 1, 1988 (national) – February 2, 2021 (with Limbaugh); June 18, 2021 (in guest host/clip show format)
- Audio format: Radio
- Opening theme: "My City Was Gone" by the Pretenders
- Website: www.rushlimbaugh.com

The Rush Limbaugh Show was an American conservative talk radio show hosted by Rush Limbaugh. Since its nationally syndicated premiere in 1988, The Rush Limbaugh Show became the highest-rated talk radio show in the United States. At its peak, the show aired on over 650 radio stations nationwide.

Unbeknownst at the time, Limbaugh hosted the show for the last time on February 2, 2021. On February 17, 2021, Limbaugh's widow Kathryn announced on that day's broadcast that he had died at the age of 70, one year after being diagnosed with lung cancer.

After Limbaugh's death, clip shows with guest hosts (referred to as "guide hosts") were heard in the Limbaugh time slot for four months, until June 18. The Clay Travis and Buck Sexton Show premiered on Premiere Networks on June 21, 2021, from noon to 3 p.m. ET.

== Show airtime and format ==
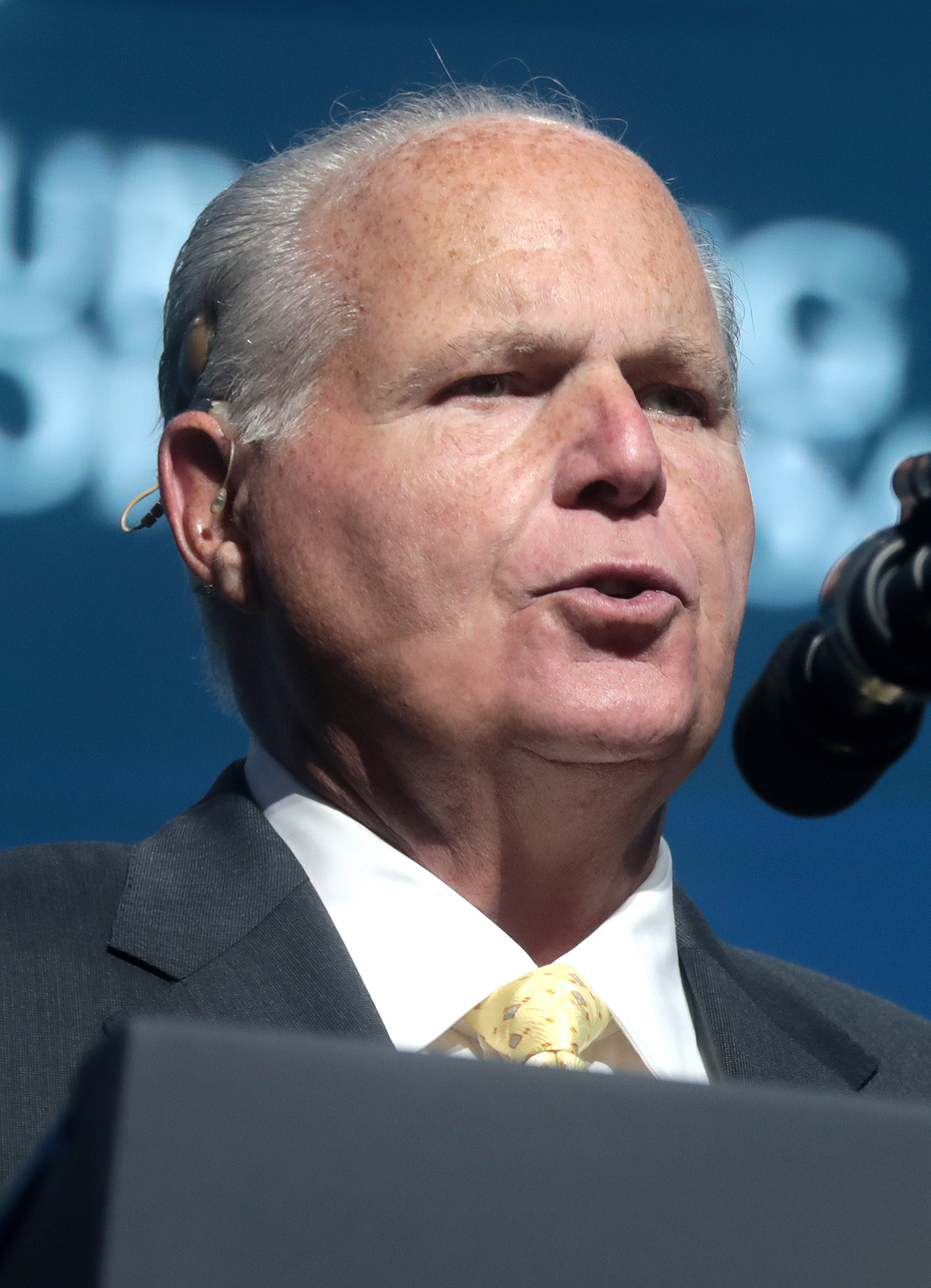
Rush Limbaugh, the show's founder and original host, in 2019

The Rush Limbaugh Show had a format that it retained until Limbaugh's death. The program aired live and consisted primarily of Limbaugh's monologues, based on the news of the day, interspersed with parody ads, phone calls from listeners, and a variety of recurring comedy bits (some live, some taped). Limbaugh also would announce live commercials during the show for sponsors. He would also sometimes promote his own products, such as his political newsletter, The Limbaugh Letter, or his Rush Revere children's history books. Occasionally, Limbaugh featured guests such as politicians or fellow commentators.

An edited instrumental version of the Pretenders' "My City Was Gone" was Limbaugh's theme song at the start of his show's run. Briefly in 1999, Limbaugh stopped playing the song after a "cease and desist" order was issued by EMI. However, after the song's writer, Chrissie Hynde, said in a radio interview she did not mind the use of the song (she and Limbaugh had a mutual opposition to an Environmental Protection Agency plan for animal testing), an agreement was reached with EMI. The show aired live on weekdays from noon to 3 p.m. Eastern time, with a number of stations (such as WHO in Des Moines) airing it on tape delay. From 2006 until his death, the program was normally taped from Limbaugh's studios near his home in Palm Beach County, Florida.

=== Distribution ===
The Rush Limbaugh Show, a production of Limbaugh's company EIB Network (Excellence In Broadcasting Network), aired on a network of approximately 650 AM and FM affiliate stations throughout the United States, almost all of which broadcast the program live. During its existence, WRNO simulcasted the program on shortwave radio. Limbaugh also hosted his own online Internet streaming audio and video broadcast, through Streamlink. This broadcast was restricted to members of Limbaugh's "Rush 24/7" service, but could also be heard on some stations' streaming audio feeds. Premiere Networks, a division of iHeartMedia, the largest U.S. radio station owner, owned distribution rights to the program. The program was not heard on any stations in Canada, although stations along the northern border of the United States gave the show coverage in much of southern Canada. The show was never carried on any satellite radio service, and was one of the few nationally syndicated talk radio programs not to be featured on satellite radio. Limbaugh attributed this decision to his desire to maximize value for his terrestrial radio affiliates.

The Rush Limbaugh Show was unusual among syndicated radio programs in that it was fee-based; radio stations pay iHeartMedia hundreds of thousands of dollars (the exact amount depends on market size) for the rights to carry the show, in addition to giving up 15 minutes of daily ad time for barter advertisements and the Morning Update. The rights fees were dropped following Limbaugh's death.

An official weekend edition of the program, consisting of "best of" clips from the weekday show, entitled The Rush Limbaugh Week in Review, was launched in January 2008.

=== Notable guests ===
In September 1992, then President George H. W. Bush made an appearance on Limbaugh's show. Charlton Heston called in to the show in 1995 to read from Michael Crichton's book Jurassic Park. Secretary of State Colin Powell appeared on the show in November 2003 when Roger Hedgecock was guest-hosting the show.

Former President George W. Bush appeared six times on the program. The first time was during the 2000 presidential campaign. Then, in 2004, he "called in" to a live broadcast during the week of the 2004 Republican National Convention to give a preview of his nomination acceptance speech. He called in again in 2006. The fourth time was April 18, 2008, when Limbaugh asked the White House to speak with Bush to thank him for the ceremony welcoming Pope Benedict XVI, which awed Limbaugh. The fifth call was during the show's 20th anniversary celebration, in which then-President Bush (and George H. W. Bush and Jeb Bush) congratulated Limbaugh. He appeared a sixth time for an interview regarding his autobiography, Decision Points, on November 9, 2010.

Vice President Dick Cheney made multiple appearances.

In 2007, California Governor Arnold Schwarzenegger called in to a live broadcast of the show a day after having called Limbaugh "irrelevant", adding, "I'm not his servant. I'm the people's servant of California," on an appearance on NBC's Today show.

Other notable guests who called in to Limbaugh's show include former Secretary of Defense Donald Rumsfeld, Secretary of State Condoleezza Rice, unsuccessful Supreme Court nominee Robert Bork, economist Thomas Sowell, former Federal Reserve Chairman Alan Greenspan, and television writer Joel Surnow, who took calls about events in his show, 24. In December 2006, Sylvester Stallone made an appearance on the show to discuss his upcoming movie Rocky Balboa. On February 27, 2004, actor Jim Caviezel called in to the program to discuss The Passion of the Christ, in which Caviezel played the role of Jesus Christ. Republican vice presidential nominee Governor Sarah Palin (R–AK) also called into a show before a rally in October 2008 to discuss the election and the economic distortion and impact of Senator Obama's tax policy; Palin returned to the show in November 2009 to discuss her book Going Rogue: An American Life. Phil Gingrey, a congressman who compared shows such as Limbaugh and Sean Hannity to "throwing bricks" in January 2009, gave an interview on Limbaugh's show the following day.

Limbaugh also had author and Washington Times columnist Bill Gertz on his show to discuss Gertz's books as well as national security issues. In 2007, Limbaugh (among numerous other hosts) interviewed Supreme Court Justice Clarence Thomas and was the first to interview Tony Snow after his departure from his post as White House press secretary. He also interviewed NBC News host Tim Russert in 2004. In May 2010, country musician John Rich reported for Limbaugh on the May 2010 Tennessee floods.

Future president Donald Trump appeared on the show April 15, 2011, and donated $100,000 to the Leukemia & Lymphoma Society, for which Limbaugh held an annual radiothon. On December 6, 2012, Limbaugh interviewed outgoing Senator Jim DeMint shortly after he announced his resignation from his seat to head The Heritage Foundation.

== Program staff ==
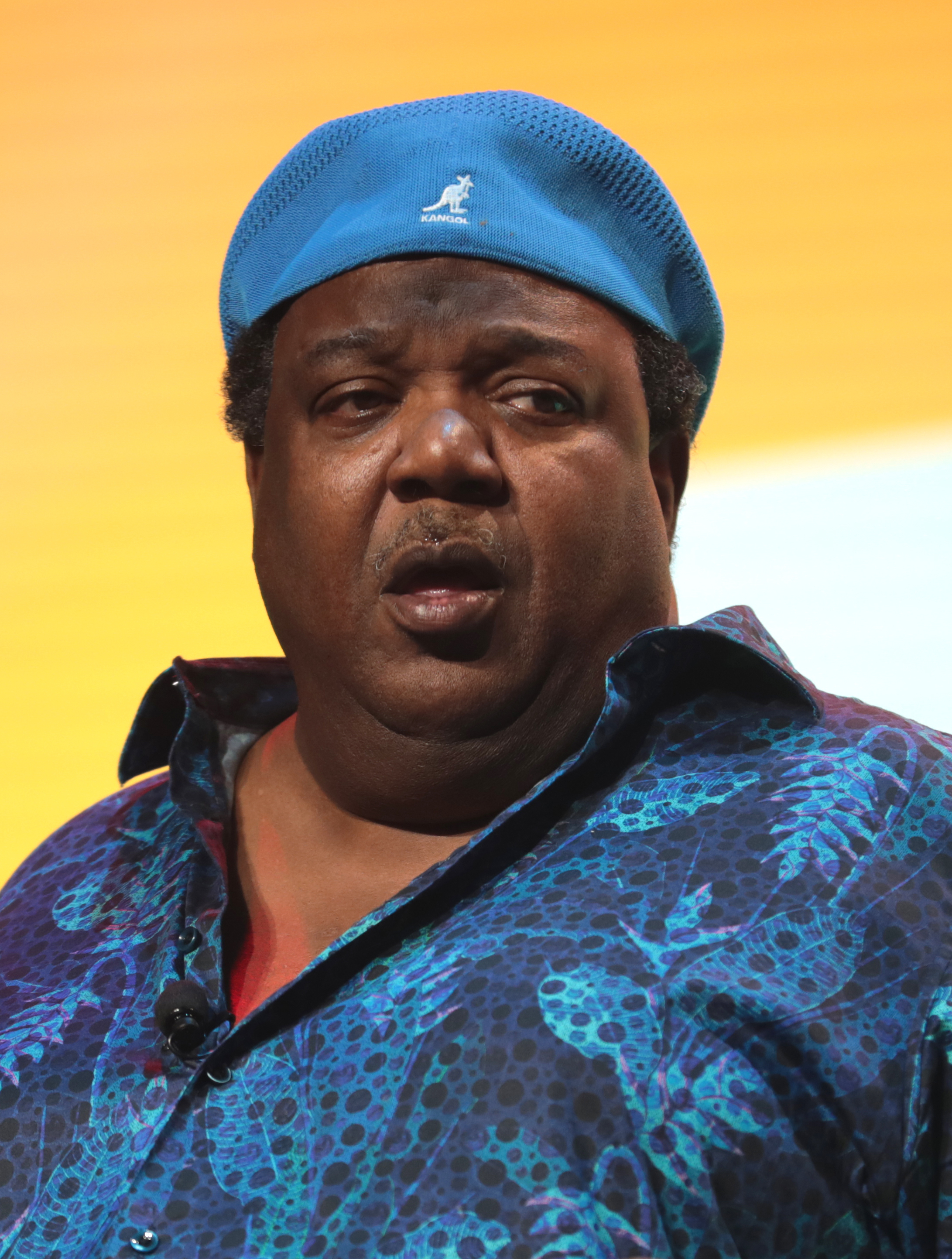
Bo Snerdley

James Golden (as Bo Snerdley)
The official "program-observer" and call screener. With other staff members, he assisted with research as part of preparation for the show and was in the control booth as the show was being broadcast. He co-hosted a Sunday night talk show, James and Joel, on WABC with Joel Santisteban from 1992 to 1998. Snerdley is a pseudonym Limbaugh invented many years earlier when he was a disc jockey on WIXZ (when Limbaugh went by the name Jeff Christy); he would use the name Snerdley for supposed-listeners who would write or call in, usually professing to be big fans and part of the "Christy Nation". Later, the name Snerdley was used for his call screeners, both male and female. The first name "Bo" was added by Golden in homage to Bo Jackson. During a show in 2004, Limbaugh was not at the microphone for the last segment of the second hour (it was only about ten seconds), and Snerdley came on instead: "This is Bo Snerdley, Rush will be right back on the EIB Network (Excellence in Broadcasting)." It was one of the rare times his voice was heard on the program before 2008. "Bo" Snerdley screened callers at the Palm Beach Florida broadcasting location and in New York City. In February 2008, Snerdley, who is black, was appointed by Limbaugh as the show's Official Criticizer of Barack Obama: "certified black enough to criticize". On the July 24, 2009, show, "Bo" was put on the air as the "Official Obama Criticizer", and spoke for roughly five minutes with Rush about the Henry Louis Gates arrest controversy. On October 16, he requested (and received) air time to air a five-minute rant that criticized NFL players, Al Sharpton, Jesse Jackson, and media commentators who opposed Rush Limbaugh's potential bid on the St. Louis Rams. Golden later joined iHeart Media as a producer.
George Prayias (as Koko)
The webmaster for Rush 24/7 (and its successor EIB 24/7) Web site. The nickname was given by Limbaugh when George put a gorilla suit on for a gag on Limbaugh's TV show. He is currently the Vice President of Digital for the EIB Network, which continues to this day managing the Limbaugh archives and the EIB Network's current show.
Kathleen Prayias (as Cookie Gleason)
Executive Producer for the EIB Network. Originally affiliated with the EIB Network since 1992, she was an associate producer on his television program (whose rights are now held by Tegna Media as successor to syndicator Multimedia, Inc.). She did research and produces all of the audio sound bites played on Rush's show. She's most known for her audio montages, such as "Gravitas". She got her nickname from Rush's television show where she played "Cookie Gleason", a take-off on Cokie Roberts.
Brian
EIB network broadcast engineer.
Dawn
Transcribed caller comments onto a computer screen to aid Limbaugh, who heard via a cochlear implant and therefore sometimes had difficulties clearly understanding callers.
Christopher "Kit" Carson
"Chief of staff". Also known as "H.R.", Carson was Limbaugh's first employee and screened calls when Limbaugh broadcast from New York City, among other things. Carson's role was reduced as a result of the show's departure from New York along with his own battle with brain cancer beginning in 2011; Carson died January 26, 2015.
Brett Winterble
A former producer. Winterble, as of 2020, hosts a local program on WBT and a national television program on Newsmax TV. After Limbaugh's death, he hosted the show himself.
Altamont
His duties consisted of call screening and board operations, and serving as backup when the others are out or unavailable. Left the show in spring 2006.
Johnny Donovan
Program announcer who sometimes voiced Paul Shanklin's parodies.

== Stand-ins for Limbaugh ==
Every so often, Limbaugh was absent from his show, whether for various personal reasons or because of extended trips. For instance, in early 2005, Limbaugh took a weeklong trip to Afghanistan to report on postwar conditions; he also participated in various celebrity pro-am golf events, especially when he represented his parent company, iHeartMedia. On those occasions, Limbaugh allowed "EIB certified talk show hosts" (sometimes called "Associate Professors from the Limbaugh Institute for Advanced Conservative Studies") to fill in for him. Typically, these hosts were well-known conservatives, and when Clear Channel (now iHeartMedia since 2014) acquired the network that syndicates the program, they were often hosts of local shows on iHeartMedia's owned-and-operated stations. A number of Limbaugh's former substitute hosts, including Glenn Beck, Sean Hannity, Bob Dornan and Jason Lewis, went on to host nationally syndicated shows of their own.

=== Notable substitute hosts ===
- Sean Hannity
- Glenn Beck
- Michael Medved
- Buck Sexton: Substitute host from 2014 to 2017; named by iHeart Media as the successor co-host for the EIB Network with Clay Travis in May 2021.
- Mark Belling: Host of The Mark Belling Late Afternoon Show on fellow iHeartMedia station WISN in Milwaukee.
- Mark Steyn: A Canadian journalist, columnist, and film and theater critic. Steyn traditionally hosts from his home in New Hampshire, referred to as EIB – Ice Station Zebra.
- Dr. Walter E. Williams: economics professor, strong proponent of laissez-faire capitalism, and former chairman of the economics department at George Mason University in Virginia. Williams began guest hosting in October 1992, initially against Limbaugh's wishes as Limbaugh did not believe that Williams, a non-broadcaster, had "paid his dues" in the broadcasting field enough to earn a national guest-hosting gig; Limbaugh relented after hearing Williams's first episode. He left the rotation before 2018. Williams died December 2, 2020.
- Douglas Urbanski: Award-winning Motion Picture Producer, former Broadway impresario, occasional actor, raconteur, "paying subscriber to Rush 24/7," also known as America's Guest Host, Urbanski first hosted three times in 2010, left the rotation to produce films on location (during which he briefly hosted a competing program on Westwood One) and returned to the substitute host rotation in mid-2012.
- Erick Erickson: Founder and editor of RedState and radio host at WSB. Erickson first served as substitute host in 2014 before he took over Limbaugh's time slot on March 22, 2021.
- Chris Plante: Radio host based at WMAL in Washington, DC.
- Roger Hedgecock: Former mayor of San Diego, California, and a talk radio host at Clear Channel talk station KOGO there. He was, as of 2007, the most used stand-in, and was also a fan favorite. Hedgecock spent several years out of the substitute rotation but later returned.
- Ken Matthews: A host on WHP in Harrisburg, Pennsylvania and WPHT in Philadelphia, subbed for Limbaugh on July 3, July 14, September 1, November 24 and December 26, 2017; on June 22, 2018, and again on March 19, 2020. Matthews was later an interim host before the EIB Network announced Clay Travis and Buck Sexton. Matthews hosted the final episode of the program on June 18, 2021.
- Todd Herman: A host on KTTH in Seattle, Washington, debuted as a guest host for a vacationing Limbaugh on August 24, 2017. He hosted the show on August 25, 2017; on January 2, May 24 and 25, 2018, and again on February 19, 2020. Herman later served as an interim host in 2021.
- Nick Searcy: An actor who stars on the FX show Justified, he debuted as a guest host for a vacationing Limbaugh on December 27, 2017.
- Michael Knowles: He debuted as guest host as Limbaugh was undergoing another round of treatments on November 20, 2020.
- Derek Hunter: The host of The Derek Hunter Podcast and author of the book Outrage Inc., he debuted as guest host on November 27, 2020.
- Kathryn Limbaugh: Limbaugh's widow appeared as a co-host on the February 17, 2021, show and again on February 22.
- Tony Snow: Snow was the primary guest host of Rush Limbaugh's program beginning in the mid-1990s. Snow later served as White House Press Secretary under President George W. Bush.
- Chris Matthews: The host of Hardball with Chris Matthews (then being broadcast on America's Talking and CNBC) appeared as a guest host once in the mid-1990s.

== Show history ==
=== Radio syndication ===
After several years of employment with the Kansas City Royals and in the music radio business, which included hosting a program at KMBZ in Kansas City, in 1984, Limbaugh started as a regular talk show host on AM radio station KFBK in Sacramento, California. He succeeded Morton Downey Jr. in the time slot.

Based on his work in Sacramento, Limbaugh was signed to a contract by EFM Media Management, headed by former ABC Radio executive Edward McLaughlin. Limbaugh became syndicated on August 1, 1988, through EFM and his show was drawing five million listeners after two years of syndication. Lacking a name for the network during the early years, he coined the name "EIB (Excellence In Broadcasting) Network," which has remained associated with the show even after joining an actual radio network (Premiere), and the trademark is currently owned by iHeart Media, which continues to use the name for Clay Travis and Buck Sexton.

In 1997, Jacor Communications, a publicly traded company, acquired EFM. Later that year, Jacor merged with Premiere Radio Networks. In 1999, Jacor merged with Clear Channel Communications, which rebranded as iHeartMedia in 2014; Clear Channel/iHeart have maintained what is now branded as Premiere Networks as their syndication wing since acquiring it.

In 2006, WBAL (1090 AM) in Baltimore, Maryland was the first station to drop Limbaugh's program and replace it with local programming; the current Baltimore affiliate is crosstown rival WCBM (680 AM).

Limbaugh and Clear Channel signed an eight-year, $400 million contract extension on July 2, 2008. He signed a new contract for four additional years in a deal announced August 2, 2016, after Limbaugh publicly contemplated retirement. Limbaugh is believed to have taken a pay cut to remain on the air after advertisers pulled funding in response to boycotts around his criticism of Sandra Fluke and industry-wide advertising declines. Limbaugh renewed his agreement with Premiere through 2024 in a deal announced January 5, 2020.

=== Final year ===
On February 3, 2020, Limbaugh announced on his show that he had been diagnosed with lung cancer, but would continue hosting the show (though with absences to undergo treatment). In anticipation of his death, he used his December 23, 2020, episode to express his thanks and say farewell to his audience; Limbaugh occasionally hosted shows through January and would host his last new episode on February 2, 2021. His death was announced by his widow Kathryn during the February 17 broadcast. Upon the announcement of his death, Premiere Networks released a statement that during Limbaugh's terminal illness, it had organized the archive of Limbaugh's shows by date and topic to allow for at least 90 days of clip shows, selected to correspond to the current news cycle as much as possible, presented by a guest host (referred to on air as a "guide host"). The long-term plan would be to eventually cancel the program once Premiere determined that the audience was ready to move on. Stations owned by Cox Media Group and Saga Communications, along with Pittsburgh affiliate WJAS, began dropping the program in mid-March. Further defections from Audacy, Midwest Communications, and Alpha Media continued in April, with Audacy replacing Limbaugh with Dana Loesch and local programs. Cumulus Media continued to carry Limbaugh's show through the first three months in the "guide host" format, then introduced its own show hosted by Dan Bongino on May 24.

On May 27, 2021, Premiere Radio Networks announced that, as part of a programming shuffle, it would be moving its evening host Buck Sexton into Limbaugh's time slot, with Fox Sports Radio personality Clay Travis joining him as co-host, beginning June 21, 2021, as The Clay Travis and Buck Sexton Show, subsequently announcing that Houston-based host Jesse Kelly would join its lineup to take over for Sexton in the evening slot.

The final episode of the "guide host" format (and the show entirely) aired on Friday, June 18, 2021. Of the show's remaining affiliates—estimated by Premiere to be about 400—most of the carryovers to Sexton and Travis consist of stations owned by Premiere parent company iHeartMedia. Other station ownership groups chose options such as Bongino, Loesch, Salem Radio Network hosts Dennis Prager or Charlie Kirk, Compass Media Networks' Markley, Van Camp and Robbins or Fox News Talk's Fox Across America. Townsquare Media, in particular, declined to make a universal decision on its stations' replacement for Limbaugh, allowing local program directors to decide for their own stations.

Sexton and Travis also inherited the EIB brand and Limbaugh's "Rush 24/7" subscriber base—since rebranded as "EIB 24/7" and later "C&B 24/7"—and includes the archives to both shows. Travis and Sexton also promote their show as being "Inspired by Rush", and continue to use clips from Limbaugh (in segments billed as "Rush's Timeless Wisdom") to reinforce points made on the new show.

== Controversial incidents ==
=== Armed Forces Radio controversy ===
On May 26, 2004, the article "Rush's Forced Conscripts" appeared on the online news and opinion magazine Salon.com. The article discussed the controversy surrounding the fact that American Forces Radio and Television Service (AFRTS) (which describes itself as "[providing] stateside radio and television programming, 'a touch of home', to U.S. service men and women, DoD civilians, and their families serving outside the continental United States") carries the first hour of Limbaugh's show. Melvin Russell, director of AFRTS, defended Limbaugh's presence, by pointing to Limbaugh's high ratings in the US: "We look at the most popular shows broadcast here in the United States and try to mirror that. [Limbaugh] is the No. 1 talk show host in the States; there's no question about that. Because of that we provide him on our service." In addition, AFRTS produced a ballot of radio and television shows asking troops worldwide, "Who do you want that we don't at present carry?" The Rush Limbaugh Show was not listed on the ballot, but won the vote as a write-in by the troops. A later poll by Lund Media Research found that a majority of soldiers preferred that talk show programs be replaced by hip hop and rap stations, bringing into question the future of content such as the Rush Limbaugh Show on AFRTS.

Critics have pointed out that other programs, such as the eight-million listener per week Howard Stern Show, are absent from AFRTS. (This statement was made before Stern left for satellite radio in 2006.) Other claims—for example, that there is no political counterbalance to Limbaugh on AFRTS—have been rebutted by Byron York, a columnist for the predominantly conservative National Review: "American military men and women abroad have access, for example, to the talk show of liberal host Diane Rehm ... Jim Hightower and CBS News anchorman Dan Rather." Another possible political counterbalance to Limbaugh is Harry Shearer, who emphasizes his presence on AFRTS at the end of every episode of his satirical Le Show.

On June 14, 2004, U.S. Senator Tom Harkin (D-IA) introduced an amendment to the 2004 Defense Authorization bill that called for AFRTS to fulfill its stated goal of providing political balance in its news and public affairs programming. The amendment passed unanimously in the Senate. Limbaugh responded by calling the move "censorship". On his June 17 radio show, he commented that: "This is a United States senator [Tom Harkin] amending the Defense appropriations bill with the intent being to get this program—only one hour of which is carried on Armed Forces Radio—stripped from that network." The amendment never became law. As of 2005, the first hour of Limbaugh's show was still on AFRTS. Limbaugh visited US forces in Afghanistan in 2005.

This treatment of The Rush Limbaugh Show proved to set a precedent for Congressional debate on AFRTS content. The Ed Schultz Show, a liberal talk radio show with over one million listeners a week, was originally scheduled to be broadcast on AFRTS on October 17, 2005. It was subsequently pulled, with some alleging political motivation, which was later debated in Congress. A few weeks after this debate, AFRTS added Schultz to the line-up along with other talk show hosts: Al Franken and Sean Hannity.

=== Michael J. Fox controversy ===
On the October 23, 2006, broadcast of his radio show, Limbaugh imitated on the "DittoCam" (the webcam for website subscribers to see him on the air) the physical symptoms actor Michael J. Fox showed in a television commercial raising awareness of Parkinson's disease. He said "[Fox] is exaggerating the effects of the disease. He's moving all around and shaking and it's purely an act ... This is really shameless of Michael J. Fox. Either he didn't take his medication or he's acting." Three days later, on October 26, Limbaugh denied that he was ridiculing Fox, stating that, after seeing Fox without his medication, "I [was] stunned because I [had] never seen Michael J. Fox that way." Limbaugh said that he was "mov[ing] around like [Fox] does, but never once was I making fun of him. I was trying to illustrate for my audience watching on the Dittocam what I had seen."

Fox later appeared on CBS with Katie Couric and said he was actually dyskinesic at the time, a condition that results from overmedication.

However, Fox has admitted that he has, at times, deliberately not taken his medication—such as in an appearance the U.S. Senate—in order, he claimed, to demonstrate the effects of Parkinson's disease. During Limbaugh's October 26, 2006, show he said, in a discussion with a caller, "[I]n his own book [Lucky Man: A Memoir], he has written in chapter eight that before Senate committees he goes off the medication so that people can see the ravages of the disease."

=== "Barack the Magic Negro" parody ===
On March 19, 2007, Limbaugh referred to a Los Angeles Times editorial by David Ehrenstein that claimed that Barack Obama was filling the role of the "magic negro", and that this explained his appeal to voters. Limbaugh then later played a song by Paul Shanklin titled "Barack the Magic Negro," sung to the tune of "Puff the Magic Dragon".

=== Phony soldiers controversy ===
During the September 26, 2007, broadcast of Limbaugh's radio show, Limbaugh used the term "phony soldiers" when speaking to a caller who had questioned if the previous caller was really a soldier.

The caller, saying he was currently serving in the Army for 14 years, said, "They never talk to real soldiers. They like to pull these soldiers that come up out of the blue and spout to the media." Limbaugh interrupted, "The phony soldiers." The caller continued, "The phony soldiers. If you talk to a real soldier, they are proud to serve. They want to be over in Iraq. They understand their sacrifice, and they're willing to sacrifice for their country." Several minutes later, after the caller had hung up, Limbaugh read from the AP story describing the story of Jesse Macbeth. Macbeth joined the Army but did not complete basic training, yet falsely claimed in alternative media interviews that he and his unit routinely committed war crimes in Iraq.

On June 7, 2007, Macbeth pleaded guilty to one count of making false statements to the U.S. Department of Veterans Affairs and was sentenced to five months in jail and three years probation.

Media Matters noted Limbaugh's use of the term "phony soldiers" in an article on their website. The article claimed that Limbaugh was saying that all soldiers who disagree with the Iraq War were "phony soldiers", and this assertion was repeated in speeches by 2008 Democratic presidential candidates John Edwards and Chris Dodd. Limbaugh said that, when he had made the comment about "phony soldiers", he had been speaking only of Macbeth and others like him who claim to be soldiers and are not, and that "Media Matters takes things out of context all the time". Media Matters pointed out that Limbaugh did not mention Jesse Macbeth on his September 26 radio show until one minute and 50 seconds after talking about "phony soldiers" with the caller."

Limbaugh addressed Media Matters' accusations during an interview on Fox News, explaining that the caller, after discussing the phony soldiers, went into a discussion of weapons of mass destruction. Limbaugh said that he allowed the caller to continue down that tangent while, off-mic, he searched for the commentary on Jesse Macbeth to present to his audience, thus accounting for the delay. The unedited transcript of the radio show in question can be found on Rush Limbaugh's website.

=== ESPN controversy ===
In 2003, Rush was hired by ESPN to be a commentator on Sunday NFL Countdown. On September 28, 2003, less than a month after his initial appearance on the show, Limbaugh made comments about Philadelphia Eagles quarterback Donovan McNabb and his perceived less than stellar performance as of late. "I think what we’ve had here is a little social concern in the NFL," Limbaugh said. "The media has been very desirous that a black quarterback do well. … There is a little hope invested in McNabb, and he got a lot of credit for the performance of this team that he didn’t deserve. The defense carried this team."

By Tuesday McNabb responded to the comments, "It's sad that you've got to go to skin color. I thought we were through with that whole deal." On Wednesday, McNabb further elaborated: "It's somewhat shocking to hear that on national TV from him. It's not something that I can sit here and say won't bother me." After an uproar by various journalist and politicians, Limbaugh offered a resignation which was quickly accepted by ESPN.

=== Comments on Obama's policies ===
On January 16, 2009, Limbaugh read a letter on his radio show that he had received a request from a national print outlet: ... "If you could send us 400 words on your hope for the Obama presidency, we need it by Monday night, that would be ideal." He responded, "I don't need 400 words, I need four: I hope he fails." He explained that he didn't want "absorption of as much of the private sector by the US government as possible, from the banking business, to the mortgage industry, the automobile business, to health care. I do not want the government in charge of all of these things. I don't want this to work." He continued, "What is unfair about my saying I hope liberalism fails? Liberalism is our problem. Liberalism is what's gotten us dangerously close to the precipice here."

Limbaugh later said that he wants to see Obama's policies fail, not the man himself. Speaking of Obama, Limbaugh said, "He's my president, he's a human being, and his ideas and policies are what count for me."

=== "Leader of Republican Party" ===
Limbaugh was the keynote speaker at the 2009 Conservative Political Action Conference; his speech attracted widespread attention. On March 1, 2009, CBS's Face the Nation asked White House Chief Of Staff Rahm Emanuel who he thought represented the Republican Party; Emanuel named Limbaugh as his choice.

In remarks aired by CNN on March 1, 2009, Republican Party Chairman Michael Steele said that Limbaugh is "an entertainer" and his rhetoric at the convention was "incendiary" and "ugly". Steele later telephoned Limbaugh and apologized. Limbaugh stated he would not want to run the RNC in its "sad sack state".

On March 2, 2009, Limbaugh responded to Emanuel, and on March 4, 2009, Limbaugh challenged President Barack Obama to a debate on his radio program. Limbaugh offered to pay all of Obama's expenses including travel, food, lodging, and security. On March 6, Limbaugh told Byron York of the Washington Examiner that his ratings for his radio show had significantly increased since he had begun criticizing the Obama Administration.

=== Comments regarding Sandra Fluke ===
On February 29, 2012, Limbaugh said that Sandra Fluke, a Georgetown University law student and women's rights activist, supposedly was a "slut" and a "prostitute" on his radio show, in response to testimony that Fluke gave to Congressional Democrats in favor of requiring contraception to be included in insurance provided by employers, including religiously affiliated organizations that object to its usage. The negative response included boycott campaigns by social media groups pressuring the show's advertisers; as of March 8, up to forty-five advertisers had withdrawn or suspended their advertising on the show, and two radio stations, KPUA in Hilo, Hawaii, and WBEC in Pittsfield, Massachusetts, announced they would no longer broadcast the show.

In March 2012, social media boycott promoters claimed that an additional 96 advertisers had dropped the show, but The Washington Post later reported that this was just a regular quarterly notice, not specific to the controversy. Premiere responded to the boycott campaigns with an aggressive campaign to circumvent the traditional advertising agencies and account executives to solicit new advertisers, not just for Limbaugh but for its other talk properties as well; Premiere declared success with this strategy in June 2013, at which point many of the advertisers had long since returned and those that had not had been replaced. Competing networks Cumulus Media and Dial Global both blamed the controversy for advertising losses at their networks; in Cumulus's case, it was also a factor in the company's decision to drop Limbaugh from all of their stations (including several of Limbaugh's top-10 market affiliates, most of which were former ABC owned-and-operated stations) when the company's bulk carriage contract with Limbaugh expired at the end of 2013. (Cumulus backed down and signed a bulk-carriage contract extension at the end of 2013; all of Limbaugh's Cumulus affiliates except WABC were included.) The show has also been dropped by other stations such as WRKO in Boston and KFI in Los Angeles resulting it in being carried by weaker stations in major markets.

== Operation Chaos ==
In late February 2008, Limbaugh announced "Operation Chaos," a political call to action with the initial plan to have voters of the Republican Party temporarily cross over to vote in the Democratic primary and vote for Hillary Clinton, who at the time was in the midst of losing eleven straight primary contests to Barack Obama.

At the point in which Limbaugh announced his gambit, Obama had seemed on the verge of clinching the Democratic nomination. However, Clinton subsequently won the Ohio primary and the Texas primary (while losing the Texas caucus and the overall delegate split) with large pluralities from rural counties; thus reemerging as a competitive opponent in the race.

On April 29, 2008, Limbaugh declared an "operational pause" in Operation Chaos, saying that Obama's defeat in the 2008 Pennsylvania primary and fallout from statements from Obama ally Reverend Jeremiah Wright could have damaged his campaign to the extent superdelegates would shift to Clinton's side. Determining Obama had weathered that storm, Limbaugh lifted the pause the next day and renewed his call for his listeners to vote for Clinton in the upcoming Indiana and North Carolina primaries. Obama won the North Carolina primary but was narrowly defeated in Indiana, where Clinton won decisively in rural counties that normally vote Republican in presidential elections.

The overall legality of Operation Chaos in several states, including Ohio and Indiana, is disputed. In Ohio, new party members are required to sign a pledge of loyalty to the party they join for a minimum of one year, making participation in "Operation Chaos" a possible felony (election falsification) in that state. However, Ohio Attorney General Marc Dann refused to press charges on anyone, saying that it would be nearly impossible to enforce because of difficulties proving voter intent and concerns that a loyalty oath would violate freedom of association.

By 2020, the name "Operation Chaos" had become associated enough with presidential party raiding that South Carolina Republicans seeking to disrupt that state's Democratic presidential primary recycled the name for their own efforts. Limbaugh did not endorse or address the South Carolina efforts.
