= The Clay Travis and Buck Sexton Show =

American conservative talk radio program

- Other names: Clay and Buck; The Clay & Buck Show
- Genre: Conservative talk
- Running time: Weekdays: 3 hours (ET) (12:00 pm – 3:00 pm)
- Country of origin: United States
- Language: English
- Home station: WLAC (Nashville) and WOR (New York City)
- Syndicates: Premiere Networks
- Hosted by: Clay Travis; Buck Sexton
- Recording studio: Nashville, Tennessee and New York City
- Original release: June 21, 2021
- Opening theme: "My Own Worst Enemy" by Lit (2022–present) "My City Was Gone" by the Pretenders (2021–2022)
- Website: clayandbuck.com

The Clay Travis and Buck Sexton Show (C&B) is an American radio program hosted by former Fox Sports Radio personality Clay Travis and former America Now/The Buck Sexton Show host Buck Sexton. It is broadcast on over 550 talk radio stations nationwide through syndication by Premiere Networks, and is considered the direct successor of The Rush Limbaugh Show.

== History ==
The Rush Limbaugh Show had originally aired nationwide beginning in 1988, first in syndication, then on network radio beginning in 1997 when his syndicator was absorbed into Premiere Networks. Eponymous host Rush Limbaugh died on February 17, 2021, following a one-year bout with advanced lung cancer, hosting his show sporadically in his last year of life (his last broadcast was February 2). At the time of his death, he had three remaining years left on a contract he had signed shortly before his diagnosis.

As transitional programming after Limbaugh's death, The Rush Limbaugh Show aired curated compilations of segments from past episodes, presented by guest hosts. On May 27, 2021, Premiere Networks announced that its evening host Buck Sexton and Fox Sports Radio personality Clay Travis would take over Limbaugh's time slot as The Clay Travis and Buck Sexton Show beginning June 21, 2021.

Along with Limbaugh's longtime time slot, Sexton and Travis also inherited his "EIB" (Excellence in Broadcasting) brand and "Rush 24/7" subscriber base, which was rebranded as "EIB 24/7" and includes the archives to both shows, as well as the show's video simulcast live or archived. To further reinforce the connection to Limbaugh, Travis and Sexton also promote their show as being "Inspired by Rush", and use clips from Limbaugh (in segments billed as "Rush's Timeless Wisdom") to emphasize points made on the show. Limbaugh's opening music "My City Was Gone" by The Pretenders was used as the opening music on Clay & Buck, until May 23, 2022 when it was replaced with "My Own Worst Enemy" by Lit. Bo Snerdley, who was Limbaugh's call screener and producer, also makes frequent appearances. In 2022, the use of the "EIB Network" moniker was retired, and EIB 24/7 was changed to C&B 24/7.

In March 2023, the show launched the "Clay Travis & Buck Sexton Podcast Network" on iHeartPodcasts with the premiere of The Tudor Dixon Podcast.

On September 3, 2026, Travis signed a "long-term" extension keeping the program on Premiere. The extension also grants Premiere parent company iHeartMedia advertising sales rights for Travis's new podcast network Sport & State (which includes Clay & Buck as part of its lineup).

== Distribution ==
The show airs on over 550 stations - most of which are owned by Premiere's parent company iHeartMedia, including WLAC in Nashville and WOR in New York City, locations where Travis and Sexton are based. However, Clay & Buck was not universally picked up to fill Limbaugh's slot throughout his affiliate base. Other stations (mostly non-iHeart) shifted to other programs such as Westwood One/Cumulus Media's Dan Bongino, Radio America and Audacy's Dana Loesch, Salem Radio Network hosts Dennis Prager or Charlie Kirk, Compass Media Networks' Markley, Van Camp and Robbins, and Fox News Talk's Fox Across America. Other stations chose to take back local control of the three hours in full or in part for locally-originated shows or noontime newscasts.

Talkers, a trade publication that periodically issues an estimate of talk radio audiences, estimated that Travis and Sexton's show was, by a small margin, the most-listened-to of the numerous efforts to replace Limbaugh. As of May 2024, it estimated the show's listenership is 9.75 million compared to Bongino's 8.5 million and Loesch's 8 million, with the other shows showing no substantial changes from before Limbaugh's death. This number reflects a substantial decline of several million listeners from what Limbaugh had drawn most of his run.

The show is also distributed as a podcast; as of June 2023, it had an average of 13 million downloads per-month. In March 2023, the show launched the "Clay Travis & Buck Sexton Podcast Network" on iHeartPodcasts to syndicate other podcasts featuring conservative commentators, beginning with The Tudor Dixon Podcast.

== See also ==
- The Jesse Kelly Show, Sexton's former evening program until 2021
