= My City Was Gone =

Single by the Pretenders

from the album Learning to Crawl
- A-side: "Back on the Chain Gang"
- Released: 17 September 1982
- Genre: Rock; funk rock; dance rock
- Length: 5:25 (album version); 4:27 (single version)
- Label: Sire
- Songwriter: Chrissie Hynde
- Producer: Chris Thomas

The Pretenders singles chronology
"Back on the Chain Gang" (1982)	"My City Was Gone" (1982)	"2000 Miles" (1983)

"My City Was Gone" is a song by the British rock group the Pretenders. The song originally appeared in October 1982 as the B-side to the single release of "Back on the Chain Gang"; the single was the first release for the band following the death of founding bandmember James Honeyman-Scott. The song was included on the album Learning to Crawl, which was released in early 1984, and it became a radio favorite in the United States.

The song was written by Pretenders leader Chrissie Hynde, an expatriate American living in London, and reflected her growing interest in environmental and social concerns. The lyrics take the form of an autobiographical lament, with the singer returning to her childhood home in Ohio and discovering that rampant development had destroyed the "pretty countryside" of her youth. The song makes a number of specific references to places in and around Akron, including South Howard Street (line 5), the historic center of Akron that was leveled to make way for an urban plaza with three skyscrapers and two parking decks (line 8).

The opening bass riff from this song "was something that Tony Butler used to play just as a warm-up," said Steve Churchyard, the engineer for the record.

Ultimate Classic Rock critic Matt Wardlaw rated it the Pretenders' all-time fourth-greatest song, saying that it was inspired by "Hynde returning home after first finding success with the Pretenders and lamenting the many changes for the worse in her beloved former hometown." Ultimate Classic Rock critic Bryan Wawzenek rated it as drummer Martin Chambers' fourth-best Pretenders song, saying that the beat is "so simple, so stark, so basic – it’s brilliant."

== Use by the Rush Limbaugh Show ==
The instrumental opening of the song (before Hynde's vocals appear at about 36 seconds) was used as the opening theme of The Rush Limbaugh Show, a hugely popular American conservative talk radio franchise started in 1984 by Rush Limbaugh and hosted by him until shortly before his February 2021 death. The show has been hosted by Clay Travis and Buck Sexton since June 2021.

The roots of the song's use derive from Limbaugh hosting a local radio show at KFBK in Sacramento, California, in 1984, where the show stayed until 1988, when it became nationally syndicated under the EIB Network brand. Limbaugh said in 2011 that he chose it because of the irony of a conservative using such an anticonservative song, though he mainly liked its "unmistakable, totally recognizable bass line."

In 1999, Rolling Stone magazine reported that according to Hynde's manager, neither KFBK (which owned the show prior to national syndication) nor Limbaugh had licensed the song nor asked permission to use it. According to Rolling Stone, EMI took action after Limbaugh told a pair of reporters in 1997 that "it was icing on the cake that it was [written by] an environmentalist, animal-rights wacko and was an anticonservative song. It is antidevelopment, anticapitalist, and here I am going to take a liberal song and make fun of [liberals] at the same time." EMI issued a cease-and-desist request that Limbaugh stop using the song, and he complied.

When Hynde learned about the song's use by Limbaugh during an interview, she responded by saying her parents were fans of his radio show and she did not necessarily object to the usage. Licensing and payment agreements were reached, which Hynde donated to PETA. She later wrote to the organization, saying, "In light of Rush Limbaugh's vocal support of PETA's campaign against the Environmental Protection Agency's foolish plan to test some 3,000 chemicals on animals, I have decided to allow him to keep my song, 'My City Was Gone', as his signature tune..."

After a one-year transition following Limbaugh's death and Travis and Sexton's hosting of the show, they allowed the license agreement on "My City Was Gone" to lapse in May 2022 and began using "My Own Worst Enemy" by Lit as their opening theme song.

== Personnel ==
- Chrissie Hynde – lead vocals, rhythm guitar
- Martin Chambers – drums
- Billy Bremner – lead guitar
- Tony Butler – bass guitar
