= Get Close =

1986 album by the Pretenders

Studio album by the Pretenders
- Released: 20 October 1986
- Studios: AIR (London); Power Station (New York City); Bearsville (Bearsville, New York); Right Track Recording (New York City); Polar (Stockholm)
- Genres: New wave; soft rock
- Length: 47:01
- Labels: Real (UK), Sire (US)
- Producers: Bob Clearmountain; Jimmy Iovine; Steve Lillywhite

The Pretenders chronology
Learning to Crawl (1984)	Get Close (1986)	The Singles (1987)

Singles from Get Close
- 1. "Don't Get Me Wrong" Released: 22 September 1986; 2. "Hymn to Her" Released: 1 December 1986; 3. "My Baby" Released: January 1987

Professional ratings
Review scores
Source	Rating
AllMusic	3.5/5 stars
Chicago Tribune	2/4 stars
Robert Christgau	B
The Music Box	2/5 stars
Rolling Stone	Unfavorable
The Rolling Stone Album Guide	4/5 stars

Get Close is the fourth studio album by rock band the Pretenders, released on 20 October 1986 in the United Kingdom by Real Records and on 4 November 1986 in the United States by Sire Records. The album contains the band's two highest-charting Mainstream Rock Tracks entries, "Don't Get Me Wrong" and "My Baby", both of which reached number one.

The album would be the last Pretenders album with drummer Martin Chambers until Last of the Independents. Hynde fired Chambers because she thought his playing was unsatisfactory, though she would acknowledge in interviews that it was because he was still coping with the deaths of former members Pete Farndon and James Honeyman-Scott and it was affecting him musically.

== Background ==
The Pretenders' previous album, Learning to Crawl (1984), was a critical and commercial success. On the heels of its success the band performed at Live Aid in 1985. The same year Chrissie Hynde appeared with UB40 on their number-one single "I Got You Babe".

Get Close, recorded during a particularly transitional period of the band's career, consisted of a variety of sessions and included multiple personnel. The early recording sessions, produced by Steve Lillywhite, started with the Learning to Crawl lineup put together by Chrissie Hynde and Martin Chambers (following the deaths of fellow founding Pretenders James Honeyman-Scott and Pete Farndon) including guitarist Robbie McIntosh and bass guitarist Malcolm Foster (in addition to the band's touring keyboard player Rupert Black). These first sessions resulted in the recording of a cover version of Jimi Hendrix's "Room Full of Mirrors", which would become the album's closing track. Shortly after the sessions, Hynde decided that Chambers' playing had deteriorated: "Martin was playing crap. Martin just fucking lost it, and to think about it, why shouldn't he have lost it? He'd just lost his two best friends. I was insane. I was traumatised. But you don't know it at the time. I was trying to keep my shit together. To be honest Martin was playing crap and I knew musically I was losing my inspiration. But I'd tried too hard and come too far to let it all go, so Martin went instead."

Having fired Chambers from the band, Hynde was left as the only remaining original member. Foster's departure shortly afterwards left the band without a rhythm section. With Jimmy Iovine and Bob Clearmountain taking over production duties, about half of the album was recorded by Hynde and McIntosh with high-profile session players. Bass guitar was provided by Bruce Thomas (of the Attractions), Chucho Merchán and John McKenzie, and drums by Simon Phillips, Steve Jordan and Mel Gaynor, then of Simple Minds, with assorted keyboards and synthesizers provided by Tommy Mandel, Patrick Seymour, Funkadelic's Bernie Worrell, Bruce Brody (ex-Patti Smith Band) and Wix Wickens. Carlos Alomar made further contributions on percussion and synthesizer programming.

The later album sessions featured contributions from two further musicians: former James Brown bass guitarist T.M. Stevens and ex-Haircut One Hundred drummer Blair Cunningham. Towards the end of the sessions, Stevens and Cunningham were recruited into the band full-time. On release, Get Close was credited to a formal Pretenders lineup of Hynde, McIntosh, Stevens and Cunningham, despite the latter two members only having played on half of the album. All four musicians appeared on the album cover art, as had been the case with previous Pretenders albums. Unlike previous albums, however, this time Hynde was the only member pictured on the front cover, emphasizing her dominance of the band (as would be the case with all subsequent Pretenders album art).

In comparison to the New Wave stylings of the first three Pretenders albums, Get Close had a strong funk element (partially due to the substantial session contributions from American funk, soul and rhythm and blues players). The album also featured Pretenders' first power ballad: "Hymn to Her", a paean to femininity, written by Hynde's former schoolfriend Meg Keene. The band also recorded a Carlos Alomar song, "Light of the Moon".

== Tour and aftermath ==
As the Pretenders embarked on their 1986 tour in support of the album, Bernie Worrell was added to the live band on keyboards. Despite the strength of the musicians in the new lineup, it only took a few gigs for Hynde to realise that what had seemed to work for Pretenders in the studio was not right for live work, and that she was now fronting a slick funk band poorly suited to her ideas. She is quoted saying: "It wasn't an English pop band anymore. It wasn't the Pretenders." Halfway through the tour, on the advice of manager Dave Hill, Hynde sacked Stevens and Worrell in an attempt to salvage the situation (although Cunningham was retained), a decision she would later refer to as ruthless. Malcolm Foster and Rupert Black were rapidly re-hired to complete the band's live commitment. At the end of the tour, Robbie McIntosh also left the band.

Much later, McIntosh and Cunningham would be re-united in 1991 as members of Paul McCartney's backing band (appearing together on McCartney's 1991 album Unplugged, 1993 album Off the Ground and the subsequent live release Paul Is Live). According to Paul McCartney's book, it was Linda McCartney (who was a friend of Hynde's) who recommended McIntosh to him.

== Track listing ==
All tracks are written by Chrissie Hynde, except where noted. All tracks produced by Bob Clearmountain and Jimmy Iovine except "Room Full of Mirrors" produced by Steve Lillywhite.

Get Close track listing
No.	Title	Length
1.	"My Baby"	4:07
2.	"When I Change My Life"	3:38
3.	"Light of the Moon" (Carlos Alomar, Genevieve Gazon, Wayne Ragland)	3:57
4.	"Dance!"	6:46
5.	"Tradition of Love"	5:27
6.	"Don't Get Me Wrong"	3:46
7.	"I Remember You"	2:38
8.	"How Much Did You Get for Your Soul?"	3:48
9.	"Chill Factor"	3:27
10.	"Hymn to Her" (Meg Keene)	4:58
11.	"Room Full of Mirrors" (Jimi Hendrix)	4:44

2007 reissue bonus tracks
No.	Title	Length
12.	"Hold a Candle to This" (alternate version)	3:44
13.	"World Within Worlds"	3:47
14.	"Tradition of Love" (remix)	6:13
15.	"Dance!" (take 1)	5:06
16.	"Don't Get Me Wrong" (live)	3:49
17.	"Thumbelina" (live)	5:01

== Personnel ==
The Pretenders

- Chrissie Hynde – vocals, rhythm guitar
- Robbie McIntosh – guitars
- T. M. Stevens – bass guitar (3, 4, 6–9)
- Blair Cunningham – drums (3, 4, 7–9), percussion (4)

Additional personnel

- Bernie Worrell – organ, synthesizer (tracks 1, 3, 4, 8, 9, 11)
- Martin Chambers – drums (track 11)
- Rupert Black – keyboards
- Carlos Alomar – percussion (track 11)
- Bruce Brody – organ
- Mel Gaynor – drums (track 1)
- Steve Jordan – drums, percussion (track 6)
- Tommy Mandel – synthesizer
- John McKenzie – bass
- Chucho Merchán – bass (tracks 2, 4, 6, 10)
- Simon Phillips – drums (tracks 2, 5, 10)
- Patrick Seymour – synthesizer
- L. Shankar – violin (track 5)
- Bruce Thomas – bass
- Paul Wickens – synthesizer, piano
- Malcolm Foster – bass

Technical

- Bob Clearmountain – production, mixing
- Jimmy Iovine – production
- Steve Lillywhite – production
- Bruce Lampcov – engineering
- Bob Ludwig – mastering
- Helen Backhouse – design
- Richard Haughton – cover photography

== Charts ==
=== Weekly charts ===
Weekly chart performance for Get Close
Chart (1986–1987)	Peak position
Australian Albums (Kent Music Report)	12
Canada Top Albums/CDs (RPM)	9
Dutch Albums (Album Top 100)	22
European Albums (Music & Media)	17
Finnish Albums (Suomen virallinen lista)	7
German Albums (Offizielle Top 100)	33
Icelandic Albums (Tónlist)	2
New Zealand Albums (RMNZ)	13
Norwegian Albums (VG-lista)	18
Swedish Albums (Sverigetopplistan)	6
Swiss Albums (Schweizer Hitparade)	22
UK Albums (Official Charts)	6
US Billboard 200	25

Weekly chart performance for Get Close
Chart (2026)	Peak position
Hungarian Physical Albums (MAHASZ)	27

=== Year-end charts ===
Year-end chart performance for Get Close
Chart (1987)	Position
Australian Albums (Kent Music Report)	17
Canada Top Albums/CDs (RPM)	47
New Zealand Albums (RMNZ)	35

== Certifications ==
Certifications for Get Close
Region	Certification	Certified units/sales
New Zealand (RMNZ)	Gold	7,500^{^}
Spain (Promusicae)	Platinum	100,000^{^}
United Kingdom (BPI)	Gold	100,000^{^}
United States (RIAA)	Gold	500,000^{^}
^{^} Shipments figures based on certification alone.
