= Buck Sexton =

American radio personality

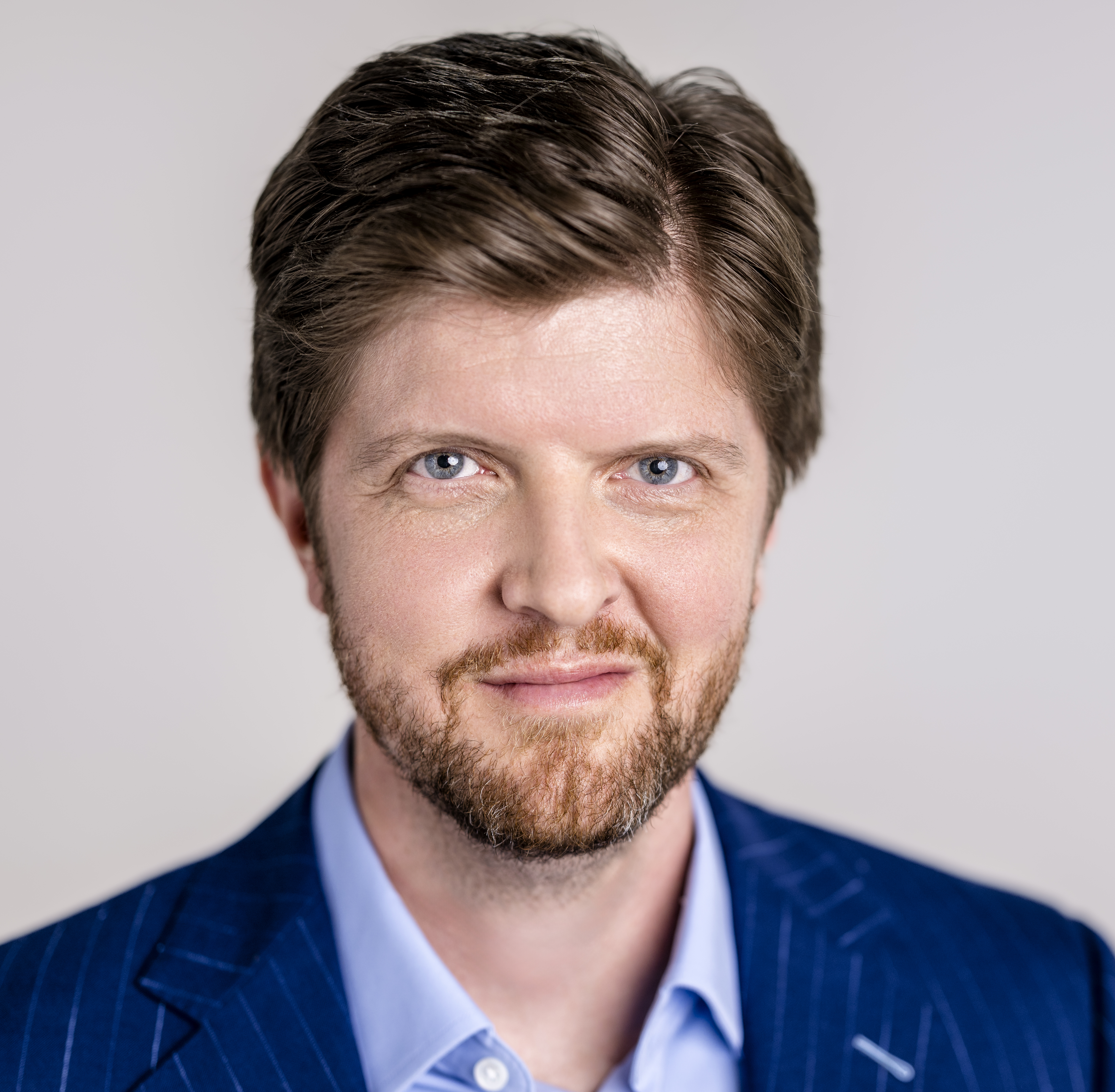
- Sexton in 2025
- Born: James Buckman Sexton; December 28, 1981 (age 44); New York City, U.S.
- Education: Amherst College (BA)
- Occupations: Radio personality; broadcaster; writer
- Employer(s): Premiere Networks iHeartMedia
- Political party: Republican
- Spouse: Carrie Flatley (m. 2023)
- Children: 1
- Relatives: Mason Speed Sexton (father); Lawrence Francis Hickey (grandfather)
- Website: bucksexton.com

James Buckman Sexton (born December 28, 1981), known professionally as Buck Sexton, is an American radio and television talk show host, author, and conservative political commentator. He is the co-host of The Clay Travis and Buck Sexton Show, a nationally syndicated talk radio show he presents with Clay Travis, and the host of The Buck Sexton Show podcast, as well.

== Early life ==
Sexton was born in Manhattan, New York City, on December 28, 1981, to Jane Buckman Hickey and Mason Speed Sexton, a Wall Street financier. Buck attended Saint David's School and graduated from Regis High School, before earning a bachelor's degree in political science from Amherst College.

== Central Intelligence Agency ==
Sexton is a former Central Intelligence Agency officer, first joining as an analyst in 2005. His assignments included the Al Qaeda-focused Counterterrorism Center (CTC) and the Office of Iraqi Analysis. His agency concentrated on threats from Al Qaeda and affiliated jihadist networks in the post-9/11 era. Sexton's analytical duties supported counterterrorism operations, including evaluations of terrorist tactics, recruitment patterns, and operational threats derived from intelligence reporting.

In 2006, Sexton transferred to the Office of Iraq Analysis, where he contributed to assessments of post-invasion security dynamics, insurgent activities, and stability challenges in Iraq. His responsibilities encompassed reviewing debriefings from sources in theater, synthesizing data on terrorist networks exploiting the power vacuum, and informing policy-level threat reporting amid the surge of al-Qaeda in Iraq and Shia militia violence.

Sexton completed multiple tours of duty as an intelligence officer in Iraq and Afghanistan, conducting field-based threat assessments in combat zones. These deployments involved real-time analysis of high-risk environments, such as monitoring foreign fighter inflows and IED campaigns, providing grounded insights into the causal mechanisms of asymmetric warfare that contrasted with domestic analytic assumptions often shaped by incomplete or politicized inputs.

== New York Police Department ==
In 2010, Sexton joined the NYPD Intelligence Division as an Intelligence Research Specialist assisting on counterterrorism cases.

== Broadcasting ==
In 2011, he joined TheBlaze — the news and commentary platform established by Glenn Beck — as a contributor and writer specializing in national security analysis, later rising to national security editor while continuing as a contributor. By 2012, he co-hosted TheBlaze TV's Real News program, providing on-air breakdowns of security threats, drawing on his declassified insights and field experience.

Sexton began co-hosting extensively for Rush Limbaugh, Sean Hannity, and Glenn Beck.

=== The Buck Sexton Show ===
Sexton built his profile through podcasts and columns pre-syndication before launching The Buck Sexton Show on TheBlaze Radio Network in 2012 to fill a weekend slot that expanded to weekdays by 2013. Relying on his CIA background, he provided listeners with structured dissections of threats like ISIS recruitment data and sanctuary city vulnerabilities. He emphasized verifiable metrics—such as casualty figures from Iraq tours and deal compliance timelines—over emotive appeals, fostering a reputation for insider-informed skepticism that led to broader distribution by 2017. In February 2017, Buck Sexton succeeded Meghan McCain as host of the syndicated radio program, America Now. The program’s distribution grew to over 200 radio stations and was renamed The Buck Sexton Show in 2018 and continued until June 2021, when Buck Sexton became cohost of The Clay Travis and Buck Sexton Show.

=== The Clay Travis and Buck Sexton Show ===
On June 21, 2021, Sexton began co-hosting the syndicated conservative talk radio program The Clay Travis and Buck Sexton Show alongside sports journalist Clay Travis, with Sexton moving from an evening show he hosted for Premiere Networks. The program is billed as a successor to The Rush Limbaugh Show, replacing Rush Limbaugh's time slot after his death earlier in the year. The Clay Travis and Buck Sexton Show, launched on Premiere Networks on over 400 affiliate stations nationwide, expanding to 550 affiliates in March 2025. The show features discussions of major news and current events interspersed with political humor and listener interactions. It has sustained strong performance metrics, including over 4 million monthly podcast downloads as of March 2024 and rankings among top U.S. podcasts by weekly downloads in early 2025.

The program extends its reach through iHeartRadio podcasts and the Clay Travis & Buck Sexton Podcast Network, which added programs like The Karol Markowicz Show in 2023 and Nation States with Yates in 2026.

=== Hosting Television Shows ===
Sexton has appeared on multiple cable and FAST channels throughout his media career, serving as a political commentator for TheBlaze TV, The First, Hill.TV, and CNN. In 2012, he was a commentator and anchor on TheBlaze TV, while also serving as national security editor for TheBlaze.com. He later hosted The Buck Sexton Show across both TheBlazeTV and TheBlazeRadio.

From January 2015 through December 2016, Sexton served as a political commentator for CNN. Following his time at CNN, he joined TheHill.com as co-host of Rising on Hill.TV and worked as a contributing columnist for the site from June 2018 until his departure in June 2019. In 2020 and 2021, he joined The First FAST channel, hosting the weeknight program Hold the Line on the channel and its mobile application, while simultaneously hosting his syndicated radio program on more than 200 stations.

== Writing ==
In 2012, his book, Occupy: American Spring – The Making of a Revolution, regarding the Occupy Wall Street movement, was published under ISBN 9781451695618. Manufacturing Delusion: How the Left Uses Brainwashing, Indoctrination, and Propaganda Against You is published by Sentinel, an imprint of the Penguin Group, in hardcover with a release date of February 17, 2026.

== Personal life ==
On February 4, 2023, Sexton married Carrie Flatley, a former television producer for Fox News. Their son, James Speed Sexton, was born in the spring of 2025. The Sextons moved to Florida from New York City in their first year of marriage and now live in Miami Beach.
