= Bo Snerdley =

American radio host and producer (born 1955)

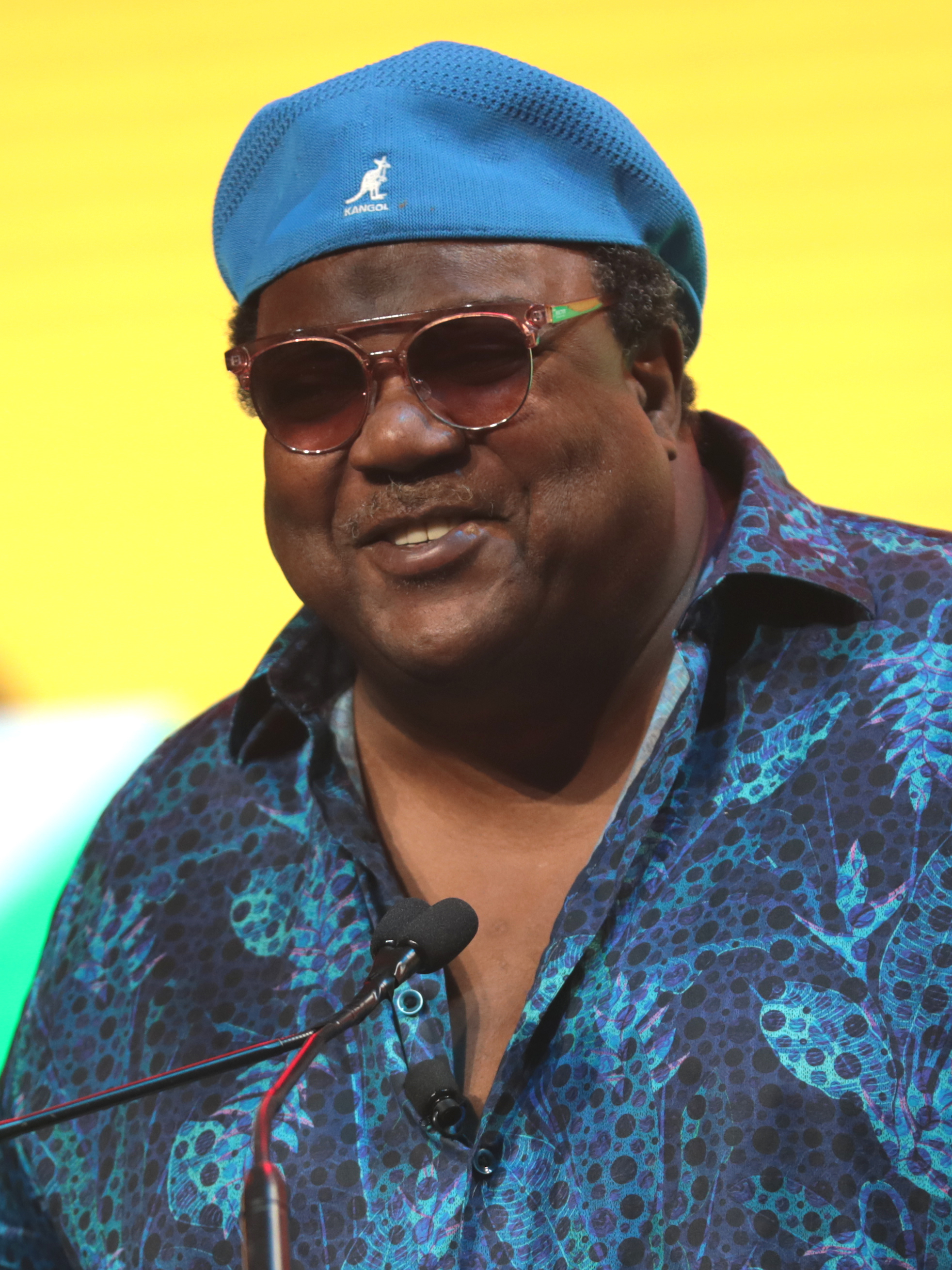
- Snerdley in 2020
- Born: James Golden; July 16, 1955 (age 71); United States
- Education: City University of New York-Queens College
- Occupations: Radio host, author, producer, political commentator, consultant
- Years active: 1992–present
- Political party: Republican
- Website: jamesgolden.com

James Golden, also known by his pseudonym Bo Snerdley, (born July 16, 1955) is a talk radio producer, call screener, and radio host best known for working 30 years with The Rush Limbaugh Show. Since 2001, he has been a producer/executive for Premiere Networks (formerly Premiere Radio Networks). He currently hosts an afternoon drive-time and Saturday morning radio program on WABC, New York.

He is a senior partner of Golden Creative Communications, LLC.

== Biography ==
Golden was born July 16, 1955 while his family lived in Buffalo, New York. His grandfather, Ulysses Golden, born in Augusta, Georgia in 1890, left Georgia early in life and moved to Buffalo, where he got a job with the New York Central Railroad as a dining room cook, advancing to porter, raising seven children on his salary plus tips. Arthur Golden, fifth of seven and James’s father, went to college, pursuing a career as journalist and contemporary writer. After serving in both World War II and the Korean War, he came home to Buffalo and married, moving his family to St. Albans, Queens in 1956.

Golden attended Andrew Jackson High School in Queens, New York, graduating in 1973. He then attended City University of New York-Queens College from 1973 to 1976.

In his early twenties, Golden worked at radio station WWRL as a marketing and research director and later served as the radio station's first music research director. From 1992 to 1998, Golden co-hosted (with Joel Santisteban) a political call-in show, The James and Joel Show, on WABC radio in New York.

== The Rush Limbaugh Show ==
Golden served as call-screener, engineer, and producer for The Rush Limbaugh Show radio program starting in 1988 and running over three decades to Limbaugh's death in 2021. He gained the nickname "Snerdley" as part of tradition with Limbaugh's radio staff (the "Bo" added off athlete Bo Jackson's name). Golden was also part of the production team on the Rush Limbaugh television program, which aired from 1992 through 1996. He worked from a control booth off the air with Limbaugh, bantering with the host "via an internal talk-back circuit" (an IFB). Golden was occasionally accorded airtime on the program.

In February 2008, Golden was assigned (as "Snerdley") a satirical cameo role by Limbaugh as the show's Official Criticizer of Barack Obama. Golden referred to himself as an "African-American-in-good-standing-and-certified-black-enough-to-criticize-Obama guy," and declared that he was speaking, "on behalf of our E.I.B. brothers and sisters in the hood." The role became an occasionally recurring feature during Obama's presidency.

After Limbaugh's death in February 2021, Golden was still credited as the show's producer for the replacement hosts. He remained involved in publication of The Limbaugh Letter, Limbaugh's newsletter, through its final issue in October 2021. In May 2021, he launched a podcast Rush Limbaugh: The Man Behind the Golden EIB Microphone on iHeartRadio.

From 1998 to 2001, Golden served as vice-president for programming at Talkspot.com, where he also hosted two Internet radio programs.

== WABC shows ==
On August 23, 2021, Golden (under his "Bo Snerdley" alias) returned to WABC and sister station WLIR-FM to host a 4:00-5:00 afternoon show, titled The Rush Hour with Bo Snerdley, and Saturdays 7:00-10:00 AM, titled The James Golden Show. Both programs are nationally syndicated by Red Apple Media, which also owns WABC.

== Book ==
- Golden, James (January 1, 2021). Rush on the Radio: A Tribute from His Sidekick for 30 Years. New York, New York: All Seasons Press. ISBN 978-1737478546.

Interviewed on The Clay Travis & Buck Sexton Show about the release of his book, Golden said of his former boss: "Rush was unto himself the most successful radio broadcaster of our time. And not only a successful broadcaster, he changed the entire dynamic for the American media and on top of all that was just an incredible humanitarian and wonderful human being."

== See also ==
- Black conservatism in the United States
- List of African-American Republicans

== Sources ==
- "Late Period Limbaugh," New York Times Magazine, July 6, 2008, including descriptions of Limbaugh's studio interactions with Golden
- Transcript of Golden's on-air commentary (as "Bo Snerdley") in his satirical role as Official Criticizer of Barack Obama, August 26, 2008
- Transcript of Golden's on-air commentary (as "Bo Snerdley") on the controversy involving Limbaugh's involvement with a group seeking ownership of the St. Louis Rams professional football team, October 16, 2009
- "Radio Panel Gets Stuck in Rush Hour". New York Daily News. August 15, 1996.
- "If You Can't Get Enough Talk, Tune Into New Internet Shows," New York Times, November 19, 1998
- "Rush Limbaugh's Right Hand Man is Black," David Love, The Grio, August 31, 2011
