= Clay Travis =

American sports journalist (born 1979)

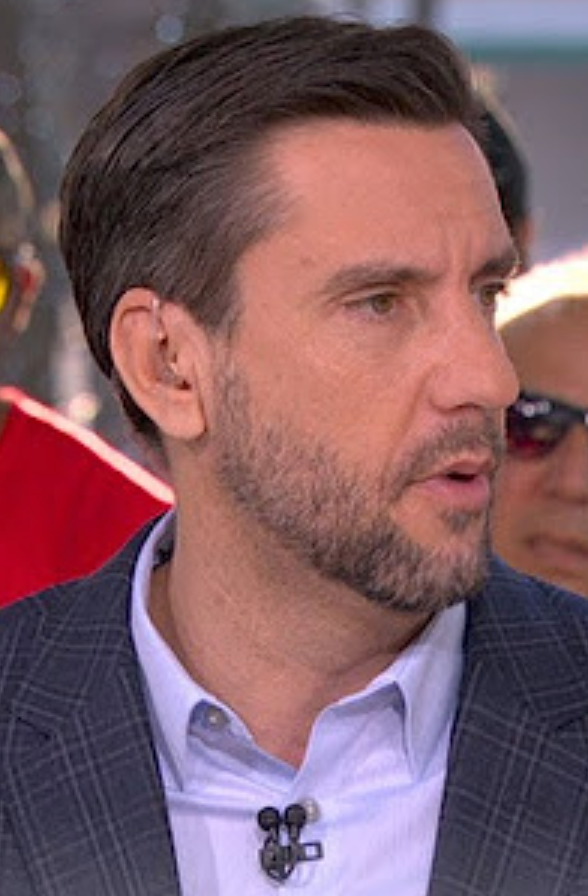
- Travis in 2020
- Born: Richard Clay Travis; April 6, 1979 (age 47); Nashville, Tennessee, U.S.
- Education: George Washington University (BA); Vanderbilt University (JD)
- Occupations: Political commentator; sports journalist; writer; radio host
- Years active: 2005–present
- Spouse: Lara Travis (m. 2004)
- Children: 3

Richard Clay Travis (born April 6, 1979) is an American political commentator, journalist, radio host, and television analyst, and the founder of OutKick.

As a political commentator, he and Buck Sexton host The Clay Travis and Buck Sexton Show, a three-hour weekday conservative talk show which debuted on June 21, 2021 as the replacement of The Rush Limbaugh Show on many radio stations. Travis has stated that he had never voted Republican before the presidential election in 2016.

== Early life ==
In 1997, Travis graduated from Martin Luther King Magnet at Pearl High School in Nashville. He graduated from George Washington University in Washington, D.C., followed by Vanderbilt University Law School in Nashville.

== Career ==
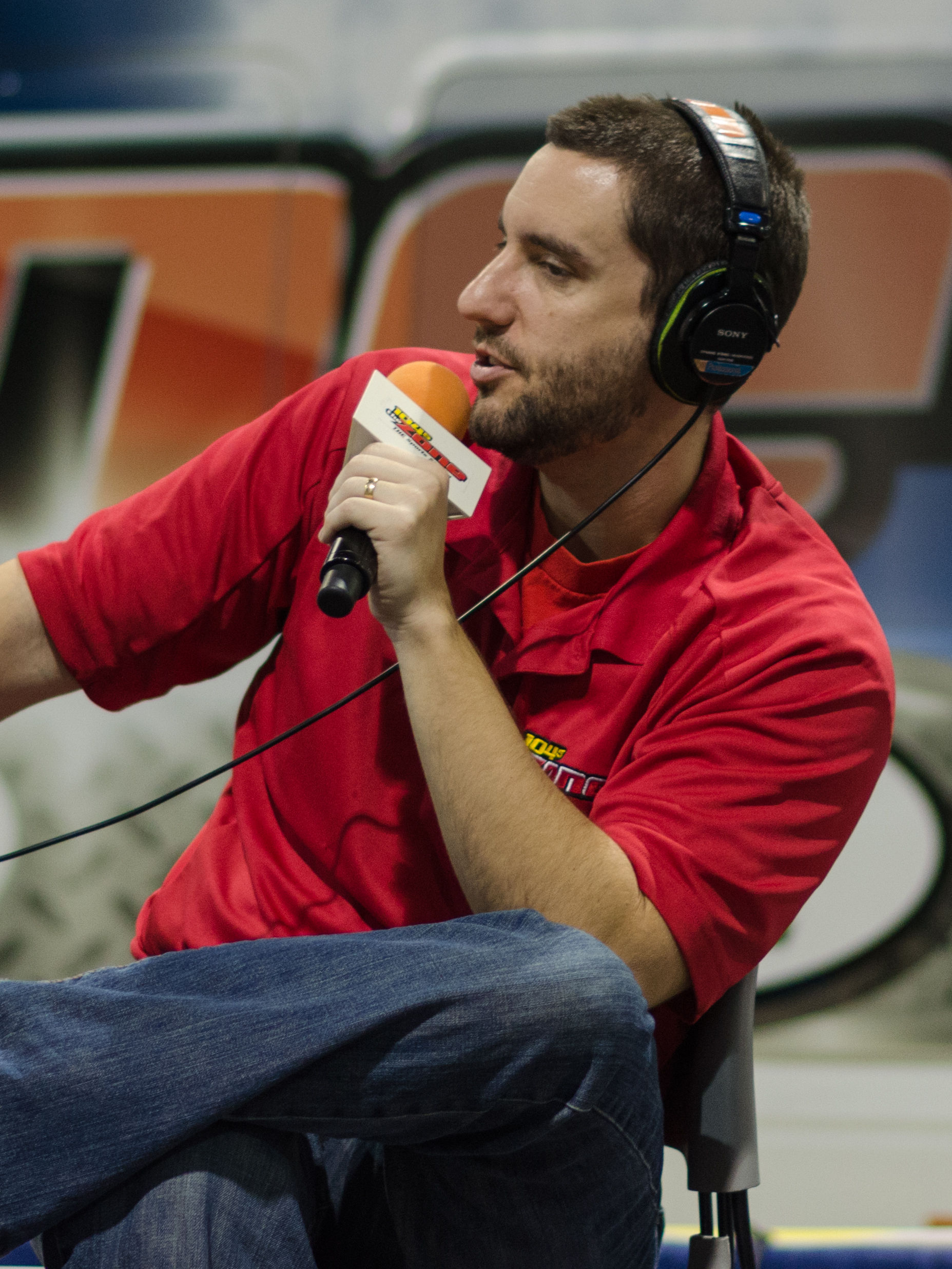
Travis in 2013

Travis originally worked as a lawyer in the U.S. Virgin Islands and Tennessee. He attracted media attention in late 2004 with his personal blog written while he was living in the U.S. Virgin Islands and working for Dudley, Topper and Feuerzeig. A Tennessee Titans fan, Travis was unable to get NFL Sunday Ticket, the satellite TV package to watch National Football League (NFL) games in the islands, and went on a "pudding strike", eating only pudding every day for 50 days, with the goal of forcing DirecTV to carry the package in the Virgin Islands. The effort failed, but he blogged about the experience and received media attention.

Travis began writing online for CBS Sports in September 2005, which for the first year was not paid. In 2006, Travis gave up his law practice for good, and when he returned to Nashville he completed an MFA program in fiction writing at Vanderbilt University. Later, while writing for CBS, Travis began working on a book, Dixieland Delight, where he visited the football stadiums of the 12 then-current members of the Southeastern Conference. (Note: The SEC expanded to 14 members in 2012 and 16 in 2024.) After leaving CBS, Travis became a writer and editor at Deadspin, and then a columnist at FanHouse.

In 2008, Travis worked out at D1 Sports Training with NFL prospects preparing for the NFL draft. He later wrote a ten-part serial about the experience which he titled Rough Draft. He also began a career in radio, initially hosting a sports talk show on Nashville's WGFX with Chad Withrow.

In 2010, Nashville Scene named Travis "Best Sports Radio Host We Love To Hate" in the publication's "Best of Nashville" issue.

=== OutKick and Fox Sports ===
After FanHouse was merged into Sporting News in 2011, Travis founded OutKick the Coverage (OTKC). The website later became one of the most visited college football sites on the web. While there, he continued developing his reputation for occasionally "contrarian" opinions and several stories talking about OnlyFans models and adult movie stars.

In 2013, he partnered with Fox Sports, with OKTC being integrated with and cross-promoted by FoxSports.com, and Travis becoming a studio contributor for Fox Sports 1's college football coverage (including Fox College Saturday).

In July 2015, Travis signed a long-term deal with Fox Sports, with roles across television, digital, and radio platforms (including a morning show, OutKick the Coverage with Clay Travis, on Premiere Networks' Fox Sports Radio, which launched in 2016).

In 2015, Travis was called out by DeMarcus Cousins for a 2010 prediction he had made that Cousins would be arrested within the next five years. In response, Travis offered to donate to a charity of Cousins' choosing.

In August 2018, Travis began hosting Lock it In, a sports betting studio show on FS1.

On May 5, 2021, Travis sold OutKick Media to Fox Corporation.

On May 27, 2021, Travis announced that he would leave Fox Sports Radio and begin hosting a conservative talk radio show for Premiere with Buck Sexton, The Clay Travis and Buck Sexton Show. The show was positioned by Premiere as a spiritual successor to The Rush Limbaugh Show, which concluded earlier in the year after host Rush Limbaugh died of lung cancer.

On September 17, 2025, Travis began hosting the weekly series OutKick the Show, for FS1.

=== Sport & State ===
In June 2026, Travis announced that he would step down as head of OutKick, but would remain a Fox News and Fox Sports contributor. Travis stated that "over the past 15 years, with the help of an incredible team and the support from Fox, that goal has been accomplished." The decision came amid the upcoming integration of OutKick into Fox News Digital.

On August 19, 2026, Travis announced a new venture known as Sport & State, which features a similar focus on intersections between sports and politics, and a weekday lineup of streaming programs incorporating The Clay Travis and Buck Sexton Show and other new shows. Travis explained that "I have a great relationship with Outkick. I just didn’t really want to be an employee, and so this is my new venture." Travis would then renew with Premiere Networks parent company iHeartMedia, with the company handling advertising sales and distribution for Sport & State.

== Political views ==
Travis said he is pro-choice and against the death penalty, voted for former President Barack Obama twice, and had previously never voted Republican. In 2016, Travis voted for Gary Johnson of the Libertarian Party. As an undergrad, Travis interned for U.S. Representative Bob Clement for four years while in college at George Washington University. In 2000, he worked on Al Gore's presidential campaign. Travis was hired to work on U.S. Representative Jim Cooper's 2002 congressional campaign but was fired for wrecking Cooper's wife's car.

In August 2016, Travis criticized his alma mater, Vanderbilt University, for planning to remove the word "Confederate" from its historic Confederate Memorial Hall, comparing the move to actions taken by "Middle Eastern terrorists." Consequently, Travis lost a $3,000 promotion deal he had with Jack Daniel's. Travis said online that a Jack Daniel's representative decided that his Twitter commentary on the statue "brings (the company) into public disrepute."

On September 15, 2017, Travis appeared as a guest on CNN, with anchor Brooke Baldwin, to discuss free speech, specifically whether ESPN personality Jemele Hill should be fired for calling Donald Trump a "white supremacist" and stating that police officers are "modern-day slave catchers" on her personal Twitter page. Travis stated that it would be bad policy on ESPN's part to fire Hill for her private comments, just as it was bad policy when ESPN fired Curt Schilling for comments he made regarding transgender bathrooms on his personal Facebook page. Travis received criticism for using a phrase he commonly used on his radio show when he said "...I'm a First Amendment absolutist – the only two things I 100 percent believe in are the First Amendment and boobs..." Baldwin cut the interview short and later responded, "when I first heard 'boobs' from a grown man on national television (in 2017!!!), my initial thought bubble was: 'Did I hear that correctly??..."

On September 20, 2017, Travis announced he was considering running as an Independent for U.S. Senator of Tennessee in the 2018 election if incumbent Bob Corker decided not to run. Travis also stated that he believed with his name recognition he "could beat anyone in the state" and would make both major parties "incredibly nervous." The following week, Senator Corker announced he would not be running for re-election, but Travis did not enter the race.

In 2018, Travis wrote Republicans Buy Sneakers Too: How the Left Is Ruining Sports based on the Michael Jordan quote, which argued against what he saw as an increasing politicization of sports by liberal voices.

During the U.S. national anthem kneeling protests, Travis was quite vocal in his opposition. When Nike released an advertisement with Colin Kaepernick in 2018, Clay denounced the move and claimed it would destroy Nike's reputation and stock. However, Nike's sales and valuation increased that same year, and the stock price rose continuously over the next three to four years with a peak of over $160 a share in 2021. Nike stock hit a 12 year low in 2026

During the early months of the COVID-19 pandemic, Travis repeatedly downplayed the severity of the disease, calling it "overrated", claiming that it is less severe than the seasonal flu, projecting that fewer than several hundred would die of the disease in the United States, that victims of the disease probably have been "killed a month or two earlier" than they would have been otherwise, and stated that the mortality rate for those under 80 and without pre-existing conditions is "virtually zero". He suggested that some advocates for mitigation measures to slow the spread were "rooting for the virus to triumph".

On October 30, 2020, Travis stated that he would be voting for Donald Trump in that year's presidential election. He said it would be the first time he had ever voted for a Republican for president. Criticizing Zohran Mamdani’s victory in the New York City Democratic primary, Travis has argued that “Democrats are largely the party of left wing white women without kids."

In reference to controversies between Indiana Fever star Caitlin Clark and other WNBA players, Travis has asserted that “black women hate [Clark]" while criticizing Clark for having “apologized for her white privilege and bent the knee to the woke lunatics running the WNBA."

== Personal life ==
Travis married in 2004. His wife, Lara, is a Vanderbilt Law School graduate and practicing attorney as well as a former Tennessee Titans cheerleader. They have three sons and live in Nashville.

== Written works ==
- Dixieland Delight: A Football Season on the Road in the Southeastern Conference. HarperCollins, Inc. 2007. ISBN 978-0-06-143124-1.
- Man: The Book. Citadel. 2008. ISBN 978-0-8065-2871-7.
- On Rocky Top: A Front-Row Seat to the End of an Era. HarperCollins, Inc. 2009. ISBN 978-0-06-171926-4.
- Republicans Buy Sneakers Too: How the Left Is Ruining Sports with Politics. Broadside Books. 2018. ISBN 978-0062878533.
- Balls: How Trump, Young Men, and Sports Saved America. Center Street. 2025. ISBN 978-0316598934.
