= Middle of the Road (song) =

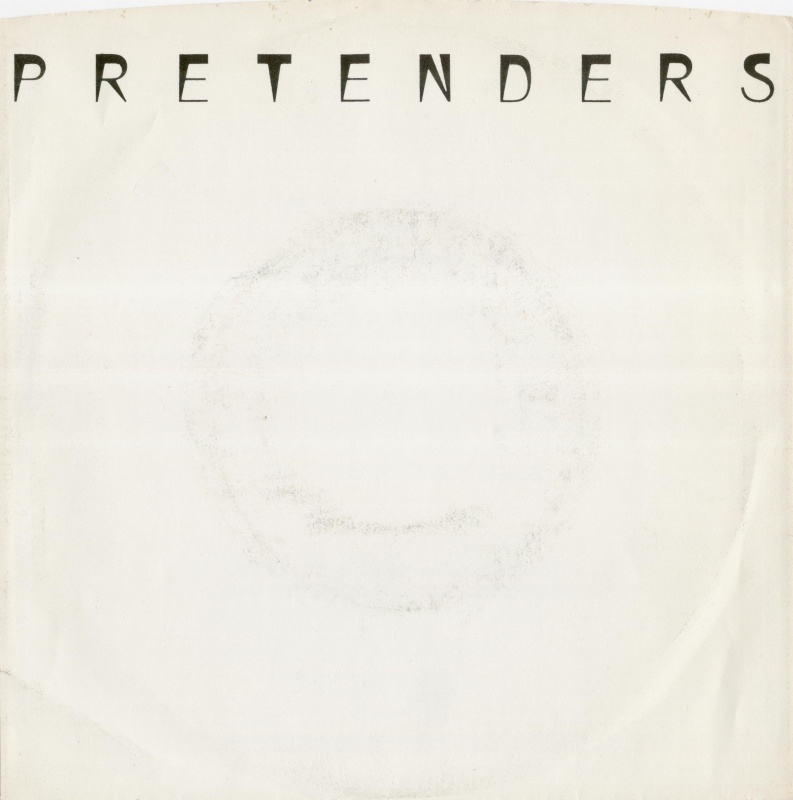
- Front cover of US single

Single by the Pretenders

from the album Learning to Crawl
- B-side: "2000 Miles" (US); "Watching the Clothes" (UK)
- Released: November 1983 (US); February 1984 (UK)
- Genre: Rock; garage rock; new wave
- Length: 4:14
- Label: Sire
- Songwriter: Chrissie Hynde
- Producer: Chris Thomas

The Pretenders singles chronology
"2000 Miles" (1983)	"Middle of the Road" (1983)	"The Thin Line Between Love and Hate / Time the Avenger" (1984)

Audio
- "Middle of the Road" (2007 remaster) on YouTube

Back cover
- Back cover of US single

"Middle of the Road" is a song by the Pretenders, released as the third single from the album Learning to Crawl. The single was released in the US in November 1983, then in the UK in February 1984.

The song peaked at number 19 on the US pop singles chart and number 2 on the US mainstream rock chart in January 1984, where it stayed for four weeks.

== Composition ==
Singer-songwriter Chrissie Hynde has stated that "Middle of the Road" refers to Tao Te Ching, which she interprets as "the middle way." According to Charles M. Young of Musician, the song is about "getting out there and mixing it up with the world." The song's lyrics include observations about the difference between wealth and poverty that Hynde had observed. The lyrics also refer to autobiographical details (i.e., the lyric "I got a kid, I'm thirty-three" although Hynde had just turned 32 when the single was released). The harmonica solo near the end of the song is uncredited. Ultimate Classic Rock attributes the solo to Hynde, who usually plays it during live performances of the song.

"Middle of the Road" uses a 4/4 time signature. Hynde has acknowledged that "Middle of the Road" uses the same chords as the Rolling Stones' song "Empty Heart" and that it does not have much melody. She says that it uses basic chords and that it is like "a regular R&B song," going on to say that "it's like taking a basic format, like the blues, and just giving it new lyrics." She describes Robbie McIntosh's guitar solo as "nifty." Audio Magazine compared the song's structure to that of Dobie Gray's "The 'In' Crowd."

== Reception ==
Billboard highlighted "Hynde's commanding, tough-as-nails vocal". AllMusic critic Liana Jonas called "Middle of the Road" a "classic example of pure, unadulterated rock music." She ascribed this to the fact that the lyrics focus on people's innate desire to "get up and go" and the "driven" music backs up the sentiment. Fellow AllMusic critic Mark Deming called it a "furious rocker."

Ultimate Classic Rock critic Matt Wardlaw rated it the Pretenders 7th greatest song, saying that "The Pretenders kick out the jams in fine fashion, from that famous opening drum break to Chrissie herself wrapping things up with a killer harmonica solo." Ultimate Classic Rock critic Bryan Wawzenek rated it as drummer Martin Chambers' top Pretenders song, saying that "he gets to do a little bit of everything: swing for the fences on the danceable beat, wake Chrissie Hynde from her daydream with a pair of lightning quick snare hits and keep pushing, pulling and racing to the song’s harmonica-drenched conclusion."

In 1989, the song was donated to a double album for Greenpeace along with other songs that had environmental or other earth-sensitive subjects titled Greenpeace: Rainbow Warriors.

== Charts ==
Chart (1984)	Peak position
Australia (Kent Music Report)	52
Belgium (Ultratop 50 Flanders)	28
Canada Top Singles (RPM)	12
UK Singles (Official Charts)	81
US Billboard Hot 100	19
US Dance Club Songs (Billboard	43
US Mainstream Rock (Billboard)	2
