= Pirate Radio (box set) =

Box set by The Pretenders
- Released: 14 March 2006
- Recorded: 1979–2005
- Genres: Rock, punk rock, new wave, alternative rock
- Length: 312:17
- Labels: Warner Bros., Rhino, Sire

The Pretenders chronology
Loose Screw (2002)	Pirate Radio (2006)	Break Up the Concrete (2008)

Professional ratings
Review scores
Source	Rating
AllMusic	4/5 stars

Pirate Radio is a career-spanning box set compilation album by The Pretenders. Released on 14 March 2006, it contains songs from 1979 to 2005, from hit singles, popular album tracks, non-album recordings, soundtrack contributions, live tracks, as well as previously unreleased material. The box set comes in four CDs along with a DVD of selected live performances from 1979 to 1995. A 60-page booklet and a poster is also included.

== Track listing ==
All tracks are written by Chrissie Hynde, except where noted.

Disc one
No.	Title	Writer(s)	Origin	Length
1.	"Precious" (Regent Park Demo) (previously unreleased)		re-recorded for Pretenders (1979)	3:42
2.	"Stop Your Sobbing"	Ray Davies	Pretenders	2:34
3.	"The Wait" (Single Version)	Hynde, Pete Farndon	re-recorded for Pretenders	3:08
4.	"Kid"		Pretenders	3:07
5.	"Tattooed Love Boys"		Pretenders	2:59
6.	"Mystery Achievement"		Pretenders	5:23
7.	"Brass in Pocket"	Hynde, James Honeyman-Scott	Pretenders	3:03
8.	"Porcelain"		Extended Play (1981)	3:52
9.	"Talk of the Town"		Extended Play & Pretenders II (1981)	3:15
10.	"Message of Love"		Extended Play & Pretenders II	3:26
11.	"Cuban Slide"	Hynde, Honeyman-Scott	Extended Play	4:32
12.	"What You Gonna Do About It"	Brian Potter, Ian Samwell	Non-album single (1981)	2:42
13.	"The Adultress"		Pretenders II	3:58
14.	"Bad Boys Get Spanked"		Pretenders II	4:09
15.	"I Go to Sleep"	Davies	Pretenders II	2:56
16.	"Day After Day"	Hynde, Honeyman-Scott	Pretenders II	3:46
17.	"Birds of Paradise"		Pretenders II	4:15
18.	"The English Roses"		Pretenders II	4:29
19.	"Time the Avenger"		Learning to Crawl (1984)	4:55
20.	"Watching the Clothes" (Denmark Street Demo) (previously unreleased)		re-recorded for Learning to Crawl	2:50
21.	"Show Me"		Learning to Crawl	4:14

Disc two
No.	Title	Writer(s)	Origin	Length
1.	"Back on the Chain Gang"		Learning to Crawl	3:53
2.	"Thumbelina"		Learning to Crawl	3:19
3.	"Thin Line Between Love and Hate"	Jackie Members, Richard Poindexter, Robert Poindexter	Learning to Crawl	3:42
4.	"My City Was Gone"		Learning to Crawl	5:26
5.	"Middle of the Road"		Learning to Crawl	4:14
6.	"Tequila"		Previously unreleased full version; re-recorded shortened version first released on Last of the Independents (1994)	3:33
7.	"2000 Miles"		Learning to Crawl	3:40
8.	"When I Change My Life" (Alternate Version) (previously unreleased)		re-recorded for Get Close (1986)	3:58
9.	"My Baby"		Get Close	4:07
10.	"Worlds Within Worlds"		Previously unreleased	3:49
11.	"Don't Get Me Wrong"		Get Close	3:49
12.	"Hymn to Her"	Meg Keene	Get Close	4:57
13.	"Tradition of Love"		Get Close	5:25
14.	"Room Full of Mirrors"	Jimi Hendrix	Get Close	4:36
15.	"Reconsider Me" (Monitor Mix)	Warren Zevon	Previously unreleased	3:18
16.	"Hold a Candle to This" (Alternate Version) (previously unreleased)		re-recorded for Packed! (1990)	3:48
17.	"Windows of the World"	Burt Bacharach, Hal David	1969 soundtrack (1988)	2:59
18.	"Never Do That"		Packed!	3:19
19.	"No Guarantee"		Packed!	3:46
20.	"Not a Second Time"	Lennon–McCartney	B-side of "Never Do That" single (1990)	2:13

Disc three
No.	Title	Writer(s)	Origin	Length
1.	"Sense of Purpose"		Packed!	3:03
2.	"Downtown (Akron)"		Packed!	2:43
3.	"How Do I Miss You"		Packed!	4:22
4.	"Bold as Love"	Hendrix	Stone Free: A Tribute to Jimi Hendrix (1993)	3:25
5.	"When Will I See You"	Hynde, Johnny Marr	Packed!	4:53
6.	"Hollywood Perfume"	Hynde, Tom Kelly, Billy Steinberg	Last of the Independents	3:55
7.	"Night in My Veins"	Hynde, Kelly, Steinberg	Last of the Independents	3:15
8.	"977"	Hynde, Kelly, Steinberg	Last of the Independents	3:54
9.	"All My Dreams"		Last of the Independents	3:12
10.	"Angel of the Morning" (Original Version) (previously unreleased)	Chip Taylor	re-recorded for Friends (Music from the TV Series) (1995)	3:30
11.	"Money Talk"		Last of the Independents	3:39
12.	"Rebel Rock Me"		Last of the Independents	3:10
13.	"I'll Stand by You"	Hynde, Kelly, Steinberg	Last of the Independents	4:00
14.	"Every Mother's Son" (Demo)		re-recorded for Last of the Independents	3:45
15.	"Love Colours"	Hynde, Kelly, Steinberg	Last of the Independents	4:32
16.	"Private Life" (Live)		The Isle of View (1995)	4:55
17.	"Lovers of Today" (Live)		The Isle of View	5:25
18.	"Creep" (Live)	Colin Greenwood, Jonny Greenwood, Ed O'Brien, Philip Selway, Thom Yorke, Albert Hammond, Mike Hazlewood	B-side of "Kid '95" single; also included in The Isle of View (DVD/VHS version)	4:02
19.	"Criminal" (Live)		The Isle of View	4:18
20.	"Revolution" (Live)		The Isle of View	5:32

Disc four
No.	Title	Writer(s)	Origin	Length
1.	"Everyday Is Like Sunday"	Morrissey, Stephen Street	Boys on the Side soundtrack (1995)	3:40
2.	"Human" (Class Mix)	Mark McEntee, Shelly Peiken	original mix on ¡Viva El Amor! (1999)	4:01
3.	"Popstar"	Hynde, Adam Seymour	¡Viva El Amor!	3:33
4.	"Back Down"	Hynde, Bernard Butler	Previously unreleased	4:16
5.	"California"	Hynde, Seymour	Previously unreleased	4:32
6.	"The Needle and the Damage Done"	Neil Young	B-side of "Popstar" single (1999)	3:45
7.	"From the Heart Down" (Alternate Version) (previously unreleased)	Hynde, Kelly, Steinberg	re-recorded for ¡Viva El Amor!	3:41
8.	"Who's Who"		¡Viva El Amor!	4:14
9.	"Biker"		¡Viva El Amor!	4:40
10.	"Nails in the Road"	Hynde, Kelly, Steinberg	¡Viva El Amor!	3:24
11.	"Legalize Me"		¡Viva El Amor!	3:56
12.	"The Homecoming" (Live in San Diego, 24 February 2003)		Previously unreleased	4:19
13.	"Up the Neck" (Live in San Diego, 24 February 2003) (previously unreleased)		original studio version from Pretenders	4:35
14.	"Fools Must Die" (Live in San Diego, 24 February 2003) (previously unreleased)	Hynde, Seymour	original studio version from Loose Screw (2002)	3:03
15.	"Nothing Breaks Like a Heart"	Hynde, Kelly, Steinberg	Loose Screw	3:28
16.	"Lie to Me"	Hynde, Seymour	Loose Screw	2:21
17.	"Complex Person"	Hynde, Seymour	Loose Screw	2:48
18.	"You Know Who Your Friends Are"	Hynde, Seymour	Loose Screw	3:30
19.	"I Should Of"	Hynde, Seymour	Loose Screw	4:02
20.	"The Losing"	Hynde, Seymour	Loose Screw	4:50

Disc five (DVD): Live performances from 1979–1995
No.	Title	Writer(s)	Performance program/location and date	Length
1.	"Talk of the Town"		Top of the Pops, 17 May 1980
2.	"The Adultress"		Fridays, 18 September 1981
3.	"The Wait"		Alright Now, 7 December 1980
4.	"Hollywood Perfume"	Hynde, Kelly, Steinberg	Later... with Jools Holland, 21 May 1994
5.	"Brass in Pocket"	Hynde, Honeyman-Scott	Top of the Pops, 22 November 1979
6.	"977"	Hynde, Kelly, Steinberg	Later... with Jools Holland, 21 May 1994
7.	"Never Do That"		Wogan, 8 June 1990
8.	"Thumbelina"		The New Show, 27 January 1984
9.	"2000 Miles"		Pebble Mill at One, 28 November 1995
10.	"Night in My Veins"	Hynde, Kelly, Steinberg	Top of the Pops, 7 July 1994
11.	"My City Was Gone"		Live in Phoenix, Arizona, 15 June 1994
12.	"Tattooed Love Boys"		Alright Now, 7 December 1980
13.	"Middle of the Road"		Live in Detroit, Michigan, 7 April 1984
14.	"Don't Get Me Wrong"		Top of the Pops, 23 October 1986
15.	"Criminal"		Pebble Mill at One, 28 November 1995
16.	"Room Full of Mirrors"	Hendrix	Music video directed by Derek Burbidge, 1986
17.	"Louie Louie"		Fridays, 18 September 1981
18.	"Stop Your Sobbing"	Davies	Top of the Pops, 15 February 1979
19.	"Tattooed Love Boys/Up the Neck"		Live in London, England, 4 March 1980

iTunes Store bonus tracks
No.	Title	Writer(s)	Origin	Length
1.	"Swinging London"	Hynde, Honeyman-Scott, Pete Farndon, Martin Chambers	B-side of "Brass in Pocket" single (1979)	1:52
2.	"Money" (Live)	Janie Bradford, Berry Gordy	Previously unreleased	4:35
3.	"Louie Louie" (Live) (previously unreleased)		original studio version from Pretenders II	3:41

Note

- Despite the box set stating the video of "Room Full of Mirrors" is from the band's live performance at the 2003 Montreux Jazz Festival, it is actually the music video for the song. Meaning that the live performances on the DVD go up to 1995, not 2003, as stated on the box set.
