= Break Up the Concrete =

Studio album by the Pretenders
- Released: 7 October 2008
- Recorded: April 2008
- Studios: Sage and Sound Studios (Hollywood, California)
- Genre: Alternative rock
- Length: 36:49
- Label: Shangri-La Music
- Producer: The Pretenders

The Pretenders chronology
Pirate Radio (2006)	Break Up the Concrete (2008)	Alone (2016)

Break Up the Concrete is the ninth studio album by rock group the Pretenders. It is their first studio album since Loose Screw in 2002. Several "exclusive" editions of the disc exist (see track listing below); each appends a new countrified version of a vintage Pretenders song, in keeping with the general sound of the album. The title song "Break Up the Concrete" was used in the opening scene of an episode of House M.D. ("5 to 9", season 6, episode 14).

The first edition of Break Up the Concrete also includes a small sheet of "handmade seed paper", which can be planted, and if cared for, promise to sprout within a few weeks. The cover art parodies the sleeve of fellow power-popper Joe Jackson's 1979 debut Look Sharp!

Break Up the Concrete was the first Pretenders album since 1994's Last of the Independents not to feature Martin Chambers on drums. In an interview, Chrissie Hynde said that she was looking for a different style, one she did not believe Chambers was capable of playing to her satisfaction. Session drummer Jim Keltner took his place in the studio, although Chambers would return for the tour in support of the album.

There were conflicting reports about Chambers' temporary ouster. Hynde claims that Keltner was actually recommended by Chambers and that he was fully aware of his replacement. Chambers, however, claimed in an interview that Hynde had not told him about being replaced by Keltner; in fact, he was unaware that an album was even being made until after the sessions were well underway. In a 2016 interview, Chambers said that he gave Hynde his blessing to record the album without him, citing his reluctance to record and Hynde's reluctance to compromise on songwriting and production.

== Reception ==
Professional ratings
Aggregate scores
Source	Rating
Metacritic	74/100
Review scores
Source	Rating
AllMusic	4.5/5 stars
Billboard	(favorable)
Blender	3.5/5 stars
Entertainment Weekly	B
Paste	(8.6/10)
Pitchfork	(6.4/10)
PopMatters	7/10 stars
Robert Christgau	(2-star Honorable Mention)
Rolling Stone	4/5 stars
Spin	(7/10)
Trouser Press	(unfavorable)

The album has a score of 74 out of 100 from Metacritic based on "generally favorable reviews". Mojo gave the album four stars out of five and said that it was "looser and more organic, and a different sonic palette for Hynde." Q also gave it four stars out of five and said, "It's Hynde who steals the show with her lip-curling vibrato, part Elvis, part Dusty, never more intoxicating than on the seductive 'Almost Perfect.'" The Boston Globe gave it a positive review and said that the album "just might be [Hynde's] most congenial, and certainly rootsiest, collection yet."

Other reviews are average or mixed: Under the Radar gave the album six stars out of ten and said it had "a few throwaway tunes", but that it was "probably the best Pretenders album since Get Close." Uncut gave it three stars out of five and said that the album might be "a bargain... but the triumphs of yore tend to expose the new album's low-fi rockabilly and country strums." The Observer also gave it three stars out of five and said that Chrissie Hynde was "reinvestigating her roots with some rockabilly and a Dylan vibe." The Austin Chronicle, however, gave it two-and-a-half stars out of five and asked, "Why not take the five really good tracks... and offer a stellar EP for download?". Trouser Press called the album "unfocused" and "disappointing", and had particular criticism of the musicianship, opining that "on about half the tracks, Hynde’s grasp of pitch is tenuous", and noting "Keltner’s drums sound like cardboard boxes on many of the tracks, and the low end is so lacking that a listener might wonder if Wilkinson even showed up."

== Track listing ==
All tracks are written by Chrissie Hynde, except where noted.

Break Up the Concrete track listing
No.	Title	Writer(s)	Length
1.	"Boots of Chinese Plastic"		2:31
2.	"The Nothing Maker"		3:58
3.	"Don't Lose Faith in Me"		2:45
4.	"Don't Cut Your Hair"		2:14
5.	"Love's a Mystery"		3:03
6.	"The Last Ride"		3:40
7.	"Almost Perfect"		4:48
8.	"You Didn't Have To"		3:09
9.	"Rosalee"	Robert Kidney	4:14
10.	"Break Up the Concrete"		2:39
11.	"One Thing Never Changed"		3:46

Walmart bonus tracks
No.	Title	Writer(s)	Length
12.	"I Go to Sleep" (new version)	Ray Davies	2:55
13.	"Both Sides of Goodbye" (with Willie Nelson)	Jackson Leap; Kim Williams	4:03

iTunes Store bonus tracks
No.	Title	Writer(s)	Length
12.	"Tequila" (new version)		2:34
13.	"Can't Help Falling in Love"	Hugo Peretti; Luigi Creatore; George David Weiss	4:03
14.	"977" (new version; pre-order only track)		4:03

Best Buy bonus tracks
No.	Title	Writer(s)	Length
12.	"Biker" (new version)		2:34
13.	"Nothing Breaks Like a Heart" (new version)	Hynde; Billy Steinberg; Tom Kelly	3:03

== UK and Brazilian versions track listing ==
=== Disc one – The Best of Pretenders ===
All tracks are written by Chrissie Hynde, except where noted.

No.	Title	Writer(s)	Original album	Length
1.	"Talk of the Town"		Extended Play and Pretenders II (1981)	3:16
2.	"Kid"		Pretenders (1980)	3:05
3.	"Back on the Chain Gang"		Learning to Crawl (1984)	3:53
4.	"Brass in Pocket"	Hynde, James Honeyman-Scott	Pretenders	3:04
5.	"Message of Love"		Extended Play and Pretenders II	3:28
6.	"Night in My Veins"	Hynde, Tom Kelly, Billy Steinberg	Last of the Independents (1994)	3:17
7.	"Don't Get Me Wrong"		Get Close (1986)	3:48
8.	"Middle of the Road"		Learning to Crawl	4:15
9.	"I'll Stand by You"	Hynde, Kelly, Steinberg	Last of the Independents	3:58
10.	"Stop Your Sobbing"	Ray Davies	Pretenders	2:37
11.	"Hymn to Her"	Meg Keene	Get Close	4:32
12.	"Precious"		Pretenders	3:37
13.	"Thumbelina"		Learning to Crawl	3:19
14.	"Cuban Slide"		Extended Play	4:33
15.	"My City Was Gone"		Learning to Crawl	4:27
16.	"Day After Day"	Hynde, Honeyman-Scott	Pretenders II	4:03
17.	"I Go to Sleep"	Davies	Pretenders II	2:57
18.	"Thin Line Between Love and Hate"	Jackie Members, Richard Poindexter, Robert Poindexter	Learning to Crawl	3:41
19.	"Fools Must Die"	Hynde, Adam Seymour	Loose Screw (2002)	2:36
20.	"Up the Neck"		Pretenders	4:22
21.	"2000 Miles"		Learning to Crawl	3:40
22.	"Tattooed Love Boys"		Pretenders	3:00

=== Disc two – Break Up the Concrete ===
No.	Title	Writer(s)	Length
1.	"Boots of Chinese Plastic"		2:31
2.	"The Nothing Maker"		3:58
3.	"Don't Lose Faith in Me"		2:45
4.	"Don't Cut Your Hair"		2:14
5.	"Love's a Mystery"		3:03
6.	"The Last Ride"		3:40
7.	"Almost Perfect"		4:48
8.	"You Didn't Have To"		3:09
9.	"Rosalee"	Robert Kidney	4:14
10.	"Break Up the Concrete"		2:39
11.	"One Thing Never Changed"		3:46

== Personnel ==
Adapted from the album's liner notes.

Musicians

- Chrissie Hynde – rhythm guitar, vocals
- James Walbourne – lead guitar, piano (6), accordion (8), background vocals
- Eric Heywood – pedal steel guitar, background vocals
- Nick Wilkinson – bass guitar, background vocals
- Jim Keltner – drums, background vocals

Technical

- The Pretenders – producer
- Don Smith – engineer (2–10), mixing
- Martin Pradler – engineer (1, 11)
- Alex Pavides – assistant mixing engineer
- Stephen Marcussen – mastering
- Jeffrey Kent Ayeroff – art direction
- Lawrence Azerrad – art direction, graphic design
- Getty Images – cover and back cover image

== Charts ==
Break Up the Concrete debuted at number 32 on Billboard's album chart in the issue dated 25 October 2008 and it stayed on the chart for three weeks. The album was issued with a 'best of' in a double-disc edition in the UK and charted at number 35 on the UK Albums Chart.

Chart (2008)	Peak position
US Billboard 200	32
UK Albums Chart	35
US Digital Albums	18
US Alternative Albums	10
US Tastemaker Albums	7
US Top Rock Albums	12
US Independent Albums	2

== Certifications ==
Certifications for The Best Of/Break Up The Concrete
Region	Certification	Certified units/sales
United Kingdom (BPI)	Gold	100,000^{‡}
^{‡} Sales+streaming figures based on certification alone.
