= Relentless (The Pretenders album) =

Studio album by the Pretenders
- Released: 15 September 2023
- Studio: Battery Studios, London; Studio Bruxo, London
- Length: 48:59
- Label: Parlophone
- Producer: David Wrench

The Pretenders chronology
Hate for Sale (2020)	Relentless (2023)

Singles from Relentless
- 1. "Let the Sun Come In" Released: 11 May 2023; 2. "I Think About You Daily" Released: 16 June 2023; 3. "A Love" Released: 27 July 2023

Relentless is the twelfth studio album by the English-American rock band the Pretenders, released on 15 September 2023 through Parlophone. It is the first Pretenders album released through Parlophone and was preceded by the lead single "Let the Sun Come In". The band began their Relentless Tour on 12 May 2023, which included the UK and Ireland as well as various European, US and Canada dates through October 2023.

Three tracks have been released since the album's announcement: "Let the Sun Come In", "I Think About You Daily" and "A Love". The album's release was postponed from 1 September to 15 September due to production delays.

== Background and writing ==
Chrissie Hynde and guitarist James Walbourne wrote the songs together remotely, with Hynde saying they had "developed this method of working remotely and it seemed like we just kept on doing it for this album. This is something that we've honed down to an art in the last few years. He always comes up with something I wouldn't have thought of myself". It is the second album they have written together, after 2020's Hate for Sale.

== Recording ==
Relentless was recorded at Battery Studios and Studio Bruxo in London and produced by David Wrench. It features the Pretenders Collective, which also includes Carwyn Ellis on keyboards and guitar, Kris Sonne on drums, and bassists Chris Hill and Dave Page.

The final track, "I Think About You Daily", includes strings composed and conducted by Jonny Greenwood of Radiohead. Hynde met Greenwood after attending a performance of his score for the 2017 film Phantom Thread, when he expressed an interest in working with her. Greenwood said: "It was a genuine honour to score strings for Chrissie. The arrangement wrote itself because of that voice. She's one of the greatest singers in popular music, and her continuing passion for creation was an inspiring experience from first the email to the last note of the recording."

== Critical reception ==
Professional ratings
Aggregate scores
Source	Rating
Metacritic	85/100
Review scores
Source	Rating
AllMusic	4/5 stars
American Songwriter	4/5 stars
Mojo	4/5 stars
Record Collector	5/5 stars
The Telegraph	5/5 stars
Uncut	8/10

Relentless received a score of 85 out of 100 on review aggregator Metacritic based on 11 critics' reviews, indicating "universal acclaim". Mojo remarked that "surely Relentless is how Chrissie Hynde always wanted the Pretenders to sound", while Uncut stated that Hynde has "crooned before, but the freight of intimate emotion here, letting low notes waver within the ferally alive arrangement, is masterful. Ending an album of looking back, this is the new prime of Chrissie Hynde". Record Collector called it "a masterly achievement, tasting of truth" with a "second half [that] chooses a slow-burn temperature" and "a broader scale" than the band's previous two albums, "embracing both the diamond-hard dynamics and romantic respites of the matchless early albums".

Hal Horowitz of American Songwriter found that while the current "Pretenders lineup [...] is more ballad-oriented than many might presume", Hynde "remains a revered rock and roll veteran, one whose integrity has never been questioned, and, as the appropriately titled Relentless implies, she's not going to stop anytime soon". Timothy Monger of AllMusic described it as "another robust late-career set that exceeds expectations" although felt that closing track "I Think About You Daily" sounds "like it belongs on a different album". James Hall of The Telegraph wrote that he thought Hynde has never "sounded so honest and uncompromising" and "what sticks with you is her sincerity of delivery" across "myriad textures".

== Track listing ==
All tracks are written by Chrissie Hynde and James Walbourne.

Relentless track listing
No.	Title	Length
1.	"Losing My Sense of Taste"	4:13
2.	"A Love"	3:25
3.	"Domestic Silence"	4:03
4.	"The Copa"	4:03
5.	"Promise of Love"	3:10
6.	"Merry Widow"	4:44
7.	"Let the Sun Come In"	3:53
8.	"Look Away"	3:16
9.	"Your House Is on Fire"	3:45
10.	"Just Let It Go"	5:14
11.	"Vainglorious"	2:48
12.	"I Think About You Daily"	6:25
Total length:		48:59

== Personnel ==
Adapted from the album's liner notes.

The Pretenders

- Chrissie Hynde – vocals (all tracks), electric guitar (1, 2, 7, 11), finger snaps (5), backing vocals (6, 10, 11)
- James Walbourne – electric guitar (1–4, 6–11), bass (1, 2, 9–11), backing vocals (1–5, 7, 9, 11), Mellotron (5, 9, 10), piano (5, 12); organ, finger snaps (5); EBow guitar, Rhodes piano, Logan String Melody keyboard (9)
- Carwyn Ellis – acoustic guitar (1, 4, 8, 10), organ (3, 6); Mellotron (6, 12), Ace Tone (6)
- Chris Hill – bass (3–6), upright bass (8, 12)
- Dave Page – bass (7, 11)
- Kris Sonne – drums (1–8, 10–12), tambourine (6, 10), backing vocals (1, 4), finger snaps (5)

Additional musicians

- David Wrench – bongos (4), finger snaps (5), backing vocals (7); Moog One synthesizer, Tempest drum machine, Space Echo effects (9)
- Jonny Greenwood – string arrangement (12)
- 12 Ensemble – strings (12)

Technical

- David Wrench – production, mixing
- Matt Colton – mastering
- Grace Banks – engineering
- Ed Farrell – engineering assistance
- Jamie Sprosen – engineering assistance
- Graeme Stewart – string engineering (12)
- Omri Katan – string engineering assistance (12)
- Stuart Crouch Creative – design, artwork
- Solus – cover graffiti

== Charts ==
Chart performance for Relentless
Chart (2023)	Peak position
Belgian Albums (Ultratop Flanders)	63
Belgian Albums (Ultratop Wallonia)	38
French Albums (SNEP)	86
German Albums (Offizielle Top 100)	43
Hungarian Physical Albums (MAHASZ)	12
Scottish Albums (OCC)	10
Swiss Albums (Schweizer Hitparade)	15
UK Albums (OCC)	25
