= Hate for Sale =

Studio album by the Pretenders
- Released: July 17, 2020
- Studio: RAK Studios (London); The Bunker at 13 Studios (London)
- Genre: Rock
- Length: 30:29
- Label: BMG
- Producer: Stephen Street

The Pretenders chronology
Alone (2016)	Hate for Sale (2020)	Relentless (2023)

Singles from Hate for Sale
- 1. "The Buzz" Released: March 17, 2020; 2. "Hate for Sale" Released: March 24, 2020; 3. "You Can't Hurt a Fool" Released: April 14, 2020; 4. "Turf Accountant Daddy" Released: May 12, 2020; 5. "Don't Want to be This Lonely" Released: May 28, 2020

Hate for Sale is the eleventh studio album by English-American rock band the Pretenders. It was released on July 17, 2020, by BMG Rights Management. It has received positive reception from critics.

== Recording and release ==
Lead single "The Buzz" was released on March 17, 2020, and the album was announced for a May 1 release. A five-month North American tour with Journey, announced in 2019, was originally slated to begin May 15, 2020. On March 24, 2020, Hate for Sale was delayed to July 17 due to the impact of the COVID-19 pandemic on the music industry; the band shared their the Damned tribute "Hate for Sale" the same day. "You Can't Hurt a Fool", was released, as a single, for free on April 14, 2020. On May 12, 2020, they released their third single "Turf Accountant Daddy." "Don't Want to be This Lonely", release May 28, 2020, was the fifth and final single from the album.

It is the first Pretenders album since 2002's Loose Screw to feature original member Martin Chambers, who was absent on Break Up the Concrete and Alone. It also marks the return of producer Stephen Street, who worked on the band's albums in the 1990s.

Keyboardist Carwyn Ellis and pedal steel guitarist Eric Heywood are not featured on the recording or the album artwork.

== Critical reception ==
Professional ratings
Aggregate scores
Source	Rating
AnyDecentMusic?	7.3/10
Metacritic	77/100
Review scores
Source	Rating
AllMusic	4/5 stars
American Songwriter	4/5 stars
The Arts Desk	3/5 stars
Classic Rock	3.5/5 stars
The Guardian	4/5 stars
The Independent	3/5 stars
London Evening Standard	4/5 stars
PopMatters	6/10
The Times	4/5 stars
Uncut	3.5/5 stars

According to the review aggregator Metacritic, Hate for Sale received "generally favorable reviews" based on a weighted average score of 77 out of 100 from 16 critic scores. AnyDecentMusic? gives the release a 7.3 out of 10.

Wayne Perry of Associated Press considers Hate for Sale "among the best this legendary band has ever produced" with special attention to James Walbourne's guitar work and songwriting. For the London Evening Standard, Rachel McGrath rated the album a four out of five stars, calling out several tracks and Walbourne's musicianship as well. American Songwriter's Hal Horowitz gave the same score, writing that Chrissie Hynde is as relevant and talented as ever in her over 40 years as a performer. Writing for The Arts Desk, Asya Draganova also points out Hynde's vitality as a punk musician and sums up the album as "a fun, melodic, and memorable listen".

== Track listing ==
All songs written by Chrissie Hynde and James Walbourne

1. "Hate for Sale" – 2:30
2. "The Buzz" – 3:51
3. "Lightning Man" – 2:57
4. "Turf Accountant Daddy" – 3:05
5. "You Can't Hurt a Fool" – 3:19
6. "I Didn't Know When to Stop" – 2:24
7. "Maybe Love Is in NYC" – 3:25
8. "Junkie Walk" – 2:45
9. "Didn't Want to Be This Lonely" – 2:56
10. "Crying in Public" – 3:17

== Personnel ==
Adapted from the album's liner notes.

The Pretenders

- Chrissie Hynde – guitars, vocals, harmonica
- James Walbourne – guitars, vocals, keyboards
- Nick Wilkinson – bass guitar
- Martin Chambers – drums

Additional personnel

- John Davis – mastering
- Duke Quartet: ("Crying in Public")
  - Louisa Fuller – violin
  - Richard Koster – violin
  - Sophie Harris – cello
  - John Metcalfe – viola, string arrangement
- Matt Holyoak – photography
- Will Purton – recording assistant
- Stephen Street – production, mixing, additional keyboards, percussion
- Stuart Crouch Creative – design, artwork

== Charts ==
Chart performance for Hate for Sale
Chart (2020)	Peak position
Belgian Albums (Ultratop Flanders)	150
Belgian Albums (Ultratop Wallonia)	57
French Albums (SNEP)	93
German Albums (Offizielle Top 100)	21
Scottish Albums (OCC)	11
Spanish Albums (PROMUSICAE)	42
Swiss Albums (Schweizer Hitparade)	11
UK Albums (OCC)	29

== See also ==
- List of 2020 albums
