= Loose Screw =

Studio album by the Pretenders
- Released: 12 November 2002
- Recorded: June 2001 – April 2002
- Studio: RAK (London); Sony Music (London); Axis (New York City)
- Genre: Alternative rock
- Length: 42:40
- Label: Artemis
- Producer: Jonathan Quarmby, Kevin Bacon

The Pretenders chronology
Greatest Hits (2000)	Loose Screw (2002)	Pirate Radio (2006)

Professional ratings
Aggregate scores
Source	Rating
Metacritic	71/100
Review scores
Source	Rating
AllMusic	3/5 stars
Blender	4/5 stars
Entertainment Weekly	B−
PopMatters	7/10 stars
Robert Christgau	A−
Rolling Stone	4/5 stars
Spin	7/10
Stylus Magazine	C+
Uncut	4/5 stars
USA Today	2.5/4 stars
Trouser Press	(favorable)

Loose Screw is the eighth studio album by rock group the Pretenders, and was released in 2002. It was the first time that the Pretenders had the same credited band line-up (Chrissie Hynde, Martin Chambers, Andy Hobson and Adam Seymour) on three consecutive studio albums.

== Track listing ==
All songs written by Chrissie Hynde and Adam Seymour, except where noted.

=== Original album ===
1. "Lie to Me" – 2:23
2. "Time" – 3:58
3. "You Know Who Your Friends Are" – 3:30
4. "Complex Person" – 2:47
5. "Fools Must Die" – 2:36
6. "Kinda Nice, I Like It" – 3:37
7. "Nothing Breaks Like a Heart" (Hynde, Billy Steinberg, Tom Kelly) – 3:28
8. "I Should Of" – 4:03
9. "Clean Up Woman" – 3:25
10. "The Losing" – 4:51
11. "Saving Grace" (Hynde, Steinberg, Kelly) – 3:20
12. "Walk like a Panther" (Jarvis Cocker, Richard Barratt, Dean Honer, Jason Buckle) – 4:42

=== 2003 special edition bonus tracks (Eagle Records) ===
13. "Complicada" ["Complex Person" Spanish version] – 2:57
14. "I Wish You Love" (Charles Trenet, Albert Beach) – 10:32 [from Eye of the Beholder soundtrack, 1999]

=== 2013 CD and DVD edition (Salvo Sound & Visions) ===
The CD contains the twelve tracks from the original album.

DVD – Loose in L.A.

1. "Lie to Me"
2. "Time"
3. "Message of Love" (Hynde)
4. My Baby (Hynde)
5. "Talk of the Town" (Hynde)
6. "You Know Who Your Friends Are"
7. "Time the Avenger" (Hynde)
8. "The Homecoming" (Hynde)
9. "Up the Neck" (Hynde)
10. "Fools Must Die"
11. "My City Was Gone" (Hynde)
12. "The Losing"
13. "Biker" (Hynde)
14. "Complex Person"
15. "Nothing Breaks Like a Heart" (Hynde, Steinberg, Kelly)
16. "Back on the Chain Gang" (Hynde)
17. "Don't Get Me Wrong" (Hynde)
18. "Kid" (Hynde)
19. "Rebel Rock Me" (Hynde)
20. "Night in My Veins" (Hynde, Steinberg, Kelly)
21. "Tattooed Love Boys" (Hynde)
22. "Precious" (Hynde)
23. "I'll Stand by You" (Hynde, Steinberg, Kelly)
24. "Middle of the Road" (Hynde)
25. "Mystery Achievement" (Hynde)
26. "Brass in Pocket" (Hynde, James Honeyman-Scott)
- DVD recorded live at the Wiltern Theatre, Los Angeles, February 2003.

== Personnel ==
The Pretenders

- Chrissie Hynde – rhythm guitar, lead vocals
- Adam Seymour – lead guitar, backing vocals
- Andy Hobson – bass
- Martin Chambers – drums

Additional personnel

- Kevin Bacon – bass, production, mixing
- Jonathan Quarmby – keyboards, production, mixing
- Mark "Wiff" Smith – percussion
- Colin Elliot – percussion (3, 10)
- Tom Kelly – backing vocals (7)
- Priscilla Jones – backing vocals (10)
- Mark Sheridan – backing vocals (3, 7)
- The Kick Horns – brass (6)
- The Duke Quartet – strings (8)
- Raj Gupta – production assistant
- Ian Cooper – mastering
- Simon Fowler – photography
- Stylorouge – design, art direction

Bonus tracks

"Complicada"

- Phil Manzanera – producer (Spanish vocals)
- Lucho Brieva – producer (Spanish vocals)
- Jamie Johnson – engineer
- recorded at Gallery Studio, London, December 2002.

"I Wish You Love"

- Gary O'Toole – drums
- Chris Elliott – piano, string arrangement, string conductor
- Alexis Smith – programming
- Marius De Vries – producer, string conductor
- Mike Nielsen – mixing

Loose in L.A. DVD

- Chrissie Hynde – vocals, guitar
- Adam Seymour – lead guitar, backing vocals
- Andy Hobson – bass, backing vocals
- Martin Chambers – drums, backing vocals
- Zeben Jameson – keyboards, percussion, backing vocals

== Charts ==
Chart performance for Loose Screw
Chart (2002–2003)	Peak position
UK Albums (OCC)	55
US Billboard 200	179
US Independent Albums (Billboard)	8
