= Alone (The Pretenders album) =

Studio album by the Pretenders
- Released: 21 October 2016
- Recorded: October 2015
- Studios: Easy Eye Sound (Nashville, Tennessee)
- Genre: Rock
- Length: 46:19
- Label: BMG Rights Management
- Producer: Dan Auerbach

The Pretenders chronology
Break Up the Concrete (2008)	Alone (2016)	Hate for Sale (2020)

Singles from Alone
- 1. "Holy Commotion" Released: September 8, 2016; 2. "Let's Get Lost" / "Gotta Wait" Released: February 2017

Alone is the tenth studio album by English-American rock band the Pretenders. The album was released on 21 October 2016, by BMG Rights Management. It is the first Pretenders album since 2008's Break Up the Concrete, and follows Chrissie Hynde's solo debut Stockholm from 2014.

Hynde is the only member of the band to appear on the album (which may explain the chosen album title), with the backing band consisting of session musicians; this was also the case with Packed! (1990), the first Pretenders album that used this method. The album is the band's second consecutive album not to include drummer Martin Chambers.

== Background ==
Produced by the Black Keys' Dan Auerbach, Alone was originally planned to be a solo follow-up to Chrissie Hynde's solo album Stockholm. It was recorded in two weeks in October 2015 at Auerbach's Easy Eye Sound studio in Nashville, Tennessee. It features a group of session musicians that Auerbach brought together, including Johnny Cash's former bass player Dave Roe and Kenny Vaughan on guitar, plus members of Auerbach's side project the Arcs. Guitarist Duane Eddy makes a cameo appearance on one track.

Due to a respiratory infection, Hynde was barely able to sing during the sessions and didn't record her vocals until the last two days. According to Auerbach, the vocals were done in just a couple of takes. Hynde sang live with the band most of the time during the sessions and there were songs where Auerbach kept the live vocal. On one song, "Blue Eyed Sky", Hynde feels her hoarseness is clearly heard, "I sound like I'm on death's door, but I got used to it and said, "Oh fuck it." Although not credited for playing guitar on the album, Hynde has stated that she played on "Gotta Wait". Hynde said of the sessions, "We'd play the demos, which I sent to Dan [Auerbach] before the sessions, and Dave [Roe] would write out a chart, pass it out to everyone, we'd do three takes, and move on to the next song. And I might croak out a guide vocal." Hynde has described the album as "very live-sounding because it was recorded that way."

Written during the recording sessions, the album's title track celebrates being alone. "I wrote it real fast," Hynde said. "When I said I did most stuff on my own, Dan said, "Write a song about it." I was waiting for a cab to take me to the airport when I recorded it – it was the last thing we did." "I Hate Myself" was an a cappella track that Hynde sang straight into the microphone with no musical accompaniment. "I added some cool guitar hooks and called it a co-write," she said. The track "Holy Commotion" was originally written by Swedish songwriter and producer Björn Yttling with Primal Scream members Bobby Gillespie and Andrew Innes for the 2016 Primal Scream album Chaosmosis. However, when Hynde, who had previously worked with Yttling, approached him for songs for Alone, he ended up sending her the song for which she wrote new lyrics. The ballad "Death Is Not Enough" is written by British songwriter Marek Rymaszewski – a friend of Hynde's – and was first recorded by Rymaszewski in 2013. Some critics saw it as one of the highlights of the album.

Hynde has stated that when she brought the finished album back from the studio, the people it was played to said how great it was to have the Pretenders back – "that's how they were hearing it," she explained. She then decided to release the album under the Pretenders banner.

The single version of "Let's Get Lost" features Neil Tennant of the Pet Shop Boys on additional vocals.

== Critical reception ==
Professional ratings
Aggregate scores
Source	Rating
Metacritic	77/100
Review scores
Source	Rating
AllMusic	4/5 stars
American Songwriter	3.5/5 stars
Consequence of Sound	B
The Guardian	4/5 stars
The Independent	4/5 stars
The Observer	3/5 stars
Rolling Stone	3.5/5 stars
Uncut	3.5/5 stars

Alone received generally positive reviews from music critics. At Metacritic, which assigns a normalized rating out of 100 to reviews from mainstream critics, the album received an average score of 77 based on 12 reviews, which indicates "generally favorable reviews".

The Los Angeles Daily News called Alone "something of a mixed bag" but opined that Pretenders fans will find plenty to like. "Her occasional attempts to step away from traditional Pretenders core values don't always succeed," they wrote, "but are intriguing nonetheless." They felt that the album's heart lies in a "clutch of elegantly observed romantic ballads."

Uncut felt that Hynde delivers great vocal performances and that the album has the feel of the first three Pretenders albums – "all chiming guitars, Phil Spector drum stomps and creaky vintage studio details." The Observer also praised Hynde's voice, calling it "one of rock's finest voices, still a fist in a velvet glove." They felt that "not every track is a killer, but most snarl (or sweet-talk) their way into the Pretenders' lofty canon."

The album works thanks to "Hynde's willingness to fall into Auerbach's world of vintage blues, soul, and R&B," said Consequence of Sound, and stated that "Auerbach steers Hynde into a lot of new sonic territory, but he's also smart enough not to deviate too far from what's always made the Pretenders' work." The Independent agreed, calling it "a fine album, subtly varied in both musical style and lyrical slant."

American Songwriter wrote that anyone hoping the combination of Hynde and Auerbach collaborating "would result in a raw, rustbelt Black Keys meets Iggy Pop explosion, may be disappointed. That doesn't make this ballad heavy set substandard, but it does seem like a missed opportunity." They concluded that "Alone won't go down as a great Pretenders disc up there with Learning to Crawl or the magnificent debut, but it's no embarrassment either. Despite the lack of rockers, Hynde hasn't mellowed even if her music has." According to AllMusic, the album "marries solid songwriting with a sympathetic, surprising production, all of which amounts to a very satisfying Pretenders album."

== Track listing ==
Songwriting credits adapted from the album's liner notes, except where noted.

All tracks are written by Chrissie Hynde, except where noted.

Alone track listing
No.	Title	Writer(s)	Length
1.	"Alone"	Hynde, Dan Auerbach, Richard Swift	3:49
2.	"Roadie Man"		3:54
3.	"Gotta Wait"		2:58
4.	"Never Be Together"	Hynde, Björn Yttling, Fyfe Dangerfield	4:01
5.	"Let's Get Lost"	Hynde, Amanda Ghost, Dave McCracken	3:03
6.	"Chord Lord"		3:14
7.	"Blue Eyed Sky"		4:51
8.	"The Man You Are"		3:45
9.	"One More Day"		4:15
10.	"I Hate Myself"	Hynde, Auerbach	4:43
11.	"Death Is Not Enough"	Marek Rymaszewski	3:11
12.	"Holy Commotion"	Hynde, Yttling, Bobby Gillespie, Andrew Innes	4:12

- Track 12 is not included on the vinyl version of Alone, and is listed as a bonus track on the CD version.

=== 2017 special edition ===
The first disc of the special edition contains the 12 tracks from the original album. The second disc, Alive, contains live recordings from the Pretenders' 2017 Alone tour.

Disc two

Alive track listing
No.	Title	Writer(s)	Length
1.	"Alone" (23 June 2017, Glastonbury Festival, UK)	Hynde, Auerbach, Swift	3:12
2.	"Gotta Wait" (8 July 2017, Bospop festival, Netherlands)		2:50
3.	"Message of Love" (13 March 2017, Austin City Limits Music Festival, USA)		4:04
4.	"Private Life" (13 March 2017, Austin City Limits Music Festival, USA)		5:19
5.	"Down the Wrong Way" (13 March 2017, Austin City Limits Music Festival, USA)	Hynde, Yttling	3:38
6.	"Don't Get Me Wrong" (23 June 2017, Glastonbury Festival, UK)		3:59
7.	"Night in My Veins" (23 June 2017, Glastonbury Festival, UK)	Hynde, Billy Steinberg, Tom Kelly	4:05
8.	"Let's Get Lost" (26 June 2017, La Salle Pleyel, France)	Hynde, Ghost, McCracken	3:50
9.	"I Hate Myself" (26 June 2017, La Salle Pleyel, France)	Hynde, Auerbach	4:35
10.	"I'll Stand by You" (9 June 2017, Isle of Wight Festival, UK)	Hynde, Steinberg, Kelly	4:15
11.	"Boots of Chinese Plastic" (19 July 2017, EDP Cool Jazz festival, Portugal)		2:44
12.	"Thumbelina" (19 July 2017, EDP Cool Jazz festival, Portugal)		5:07
13.	"Up the Neck" (13 March 2017, Austin City Limits Music Festival, USA)		4:28
14.	"Mystery Achievement" (13 March 2017, Austin City Limits Music Festival, USA)		5:27
15.	"Middle of the Road" (13 March 2017, Austin City Limits Music Festival, USA)		6:23

== Personnel ==
Adapted from the album's liner notes, except where noted.

- Chrissie Hynde – vocals; guitar on "Gotta Wait" (uncredited)

Additional personnel

- Dan Auerbach – guitar, keyboards, backing vocals, production
- Leon Michels – keyboards
- Kenny Vaughan – guitar
- Russ Pahl – pedal steel
- Dave Roe – electric bass, upright bass
- Richard Swift – drums, keyboards, guitar, backing vocals, artwork, photos, layout
- Duane Eddy – guitar on "Never Be Together"
- Collin Dupuis – recording
- Danny Tomczak – recording assistant
- Tchad Blake – mixing
- Brian Lucey – mastering

Alive personnel

- Chrissie Hynde – vocals, guitar
- James Walbourne – guitar
- Carwyn Ellis – keyboards (tracks 1, 2, 6–12)
- Eric Heywood – pedal steel guitar (tracks 3–5, 13–15)
- Nick Wilkinson – bass
- Martin Chambers – drums

== Charts ==
Chart (2016)	Peak position
Belgian Albums (Ultratop Flanders)	107
Belgian Albums (Ultratop Wallonia)	113
French Albums (SNEP)	198
Scottish Albums (Official Charts)	31
UK Albums (Official Charts)	40
US Billboard 200	150
