= Mr. Stress =

William Miller

Background information
- Also known as: Mr. Stress
- Born: January 1, 1943; Cleveland, Ohio, United States
- Died: May 19, 2015 (aged 72) Cleveland, Ohio, United States
- Genres: Blues
- Years active: 1960s-2000s
- Website: mrstress.net (archived)

William (Bill) "Mr. Stress" Miller (January 1, 1943 – May 19, 2015) was the leader of the Mr. Stress Blues Band, and an American blues musician active on the Cleveland music scene.

== Life and career ==
=== Early life ===
Born just after midnight on the morning of January 1, 1943 in Cleveland, Ohio, Miller's parents divorced when he was two years old. Growing up in an integrated neighbourhood, Miller was surrounded by Africa-American influences, and became a fan of jazz and blues music, regularly listening to southern radio stations. Miller attended high school in Parma, Ohio, but did not complete it, instead earning his GED when he was 19 years old.

=== Musical career ===
Miller initially specialised on the clarinet, but in 1962 moved on to playing harmonica. His first band, formed around 1965, was called the River Rats. Around 1966 they changed their name to the Mr. Stress Blues Band, based on a code-name that Miller's eventual ex-wife Wende, a nurse, had told him was used as a paging-code on hospital tannoy-systems for calling for attendants to deal with an unruly patient. The band played regular sets at Cleveland's Euclid Tavern. By virtue of being the band's vocalist and frontman, Miller himself gained the nickname "Mr. Stress" as a result. Their musical style was described as "straight blues with a decidedly Delta/Southern feel to it".

Accompanied by an original line-up of Glenn Schwartz on guitar, Wayne O'Neill on bass, Mike Sands on keyboard, and Pete Sinks on drums, Miller's band was offered a recording deal with Capitol Records in 1969, but turned it down due to what Miller perceived as unfavourable terms. They released a number of albums themselves, of which the most successful was Stress - Live at the Euclid Tavern in 1980. The band opened for numerous prominent bands, including Steppenwolf, Cream, and the MC5. In October 1994, soon after releasing the album Killer Stress, Miller suffered a heart attack. Following the heart attack, Miller suffered long-term macular degeneration which impacted his independence.

In December 2013 Miller suffered a stroke whilst giving a radio interview, with listeners calling an ambulance for him in response to hearing the change in his voice. Miller faced eviction from his place of residence around the same time, having been served with an eviction notice in November of the same year. Cleveland-area musician Colin Dussault arranged a concert in his benefit, as well as releasing an album entitled Stress Relief the proceeds of which would go to Miller.

=== Personal life ===
Miller was first married in 1970, divorcing around 1980. His second marriage happened around 1991, but the couple divorced in 1997 when his wife met someone else at Alcoholics Anonymous meetings that both had been attending. Miller had a daughter by a woman who he had proposed to but who had refused him and given the daughter up for adoption, Miller and his daughter were reunited in the mid-1990s.

== Death and legacy ==
Miller was found dead of a heart attack on May 19, 2015, at the age of 72.

People who played with the Mr. Stress Blues Band over the years included Anton Fier, Jimmy Fox, and Peter Laughner. Ohio native Chrissie Hynde's song Precious from her band's album Pretenders references Mr. Stress alongside Howard the Duck and other Cleveland landmarks. Hynde, who had played briefly with the Mr. Stress Blue Band, was advised by Miller to move to Europe, which she eventually did.
