= Straight Ahead (Tube & Berger song) =

Single by Tube & Berger featuring Chrissie Hynde
- Released: 26 January 2004 (UK)
- Recorded: 2003
- Length: 2:45 (radio edit)
- Label: Artemis Records(US); Direction Records (UK)
- Songwriter(s): Liz Winstanley, Marko Vidovic, Arndt Rörig, King Brain
- Producer(s): King Brain, Marko Vidovic, Arndt Rörig

Tube & Berger singles chronology
"Straight Ahead" (2004)	"Lovebreak" (2012)

Chrissie Hynde single singles chronology
"Love Can Build a Bridge" (1995)	"Straight Ahead" (2004)	"Dark Sunglasses" (2014)

"Straight Ahead" is a song recorded by German electronic music duo Tube & Berger, featuring vocals by American-British singer-songwriter Chrissie Hynde. The track was co-written by Liz Winstanley, Marko Vidovic and Arndt Rörig and produced by King Brain.

== Content ==
"Straight Ahead" is best known for its tweeky synthesizer melodic sound and a computerized female vocal (provided by Winstanley) chanting the chorus "...straight ahead...in one direction..." throughout the entire song. The single also gave Hynde her first ever number one single in Billboard magazine, where it reached the top spot on the magazine's Hot Dance Airplay chart.

Although the track charted in English, the duo also recorded a German-language version.

== Track listings ==
US CD maxi-single

1. "Straight Ahead" (radio edit) (2:45)
2. "Straight Ahead" (Geradeaus mix (radio edit)) (3:31)
3. "Straight Ahead" (extended version) (6:04)
4. "Straight Ahead" (Robbie Rivera Juicy dub) (7:27)
5. "Straight Ahead" (Tom Neville remix) (7:19)
6. "Straight Ahead" (Tom Neville dub) (6:40)
7. "Straight Ahead" (Geradeaus mix (extended version)) (7:25)
8. "Straight Ahead" (Geradeaus mix (instrumental)) (7:25)
9. "Straight Ahead" (Geradeaus mix (padapella)) (5:59)
10. "Straight Ahead" (Chrissie's acapella) (0:42)
11. "Straight Ahead" (Computer Girl acapella) (0:27)
12. "Straight Ahead" (Geradeaus mix (acapella edit)) (0:28)

UK 12" single

A1. "Straight Ahead" (extended vocal mix)
A2. "Straight Ahead" (Geradeaus) (Robbie Rivera's Juicy dub mix)
B1. "Straight Ahead" (Tom Neville remix)
B2. "Straight Ahead" (Geradeaus) (12" English edit)

== Charts ==
Chart performance for "Straight Ahead"
Chart (2004)	Peak position
Australia (ARIA)	56
Belgium (Ultratip Bubbling Under Flanders)	9
Netherlands (Single Top 100)	63
United Kingdom (OCC)	29
US Billboard Hot Dance Airplay	1
