= Precious (Pretenders song) =

- Dutch single artwork

Single by the Pretenders

from the album Pretenders
- B-side: "Stop Your Sobbing"
- Released: 26 July 1980 (EU)
- Recorded: 1979
- Genre: Punk rock; new wave
- Length: 3:36
- Label: Warner Music Group
- Songwriter: Chrissie Hynde
- Producer: Chris Thomas

The Pretenders singles chronology
"Brass in Pocket" (1979)	"Precious" (1980)	"Talk of the Town" (1980)

"Precious" is a song written by Chrissie Hynde and performed by her band the Pretenders. First released on the band's first album Pretenders in late 1979, the song features punk-inspired music and aggressive lyrics.

The song was released as a single in some countries and reached number 28 on the US dance charts as part of a medley. The song has since seen positive critical reception and has been included on compilation albums.

== Background ==
"Precious" was the first song that Hynde, bassist Pete Farndon, and guitarist James Honeyman-Scott played with the newly recruited drummer Martin Chambers at their initial rehearsal.

== Music and lyrics ==
AllMusic critic Stewart Mason described "Precious" as Hynde's "true calling card." Allmusic critic Stephen Thomas Erlewine praised James Honeyman-Scott's "phased, treated guitar" playing for how it supplements the "pounding rhythm." Music critic Simon Reynolds described the lyrics as a "strafing stream of syllables" mixing "speed rap, jive talk, baby babble," and the song as "punk scat, all hiccoughs, vocal tics, gasps and feral growls, weirdly poised between love and hate, oral sensuality and staccato, stabbing aggression."

Mason notes that the music of "Precious" maintains some restraint, but still sounds more threatening than other songs which sound angrier. The climax of "Precious" comes when Hynde sings the line "But not me, baby, I'm too precious/I had to fuck off!" Rolling Stone critic Bud Scoppa noted that Hynde swallowed the words "I had to" during the song's recording, making the phrase somewhat inaudible. Scoppa also notes the "fearlessness" with which Hynde sings this line. Spin critic Charles Aaron noted that Hynde's singing this line "over whipsaw guitars" made it clear that Hynde "was more than a bewitching pout." Rolling Stone critic Ken Tucker noted that he gets "startled and shivery when Hynde rejects a would-be lothario" with this line. According to Mason, the restraint until that point makes this climax "more explosive." Ariel Swartley wrote in Mother Jones about the cathartic effect of this line for women in dance clubs:

Dozens of women, otherwise amicably engaged with partners, would stop short and mouth along with Hynde's switchblade-sharp delivery of her famous "Fuck off" line. (Predictably, there were men on the same dance floor bemoaning Hynde's "macho" stance, so different from the women they knew. Hmmm.)

Mr. Stress, referenced in the line "Now Howard the Duck and Mr. Stress both strayed", is the stage name of the Cleveland blues musician Bill Miller. Hynde briefly became a member of the Mr. Stress Blues Band, but Miller felt that Hynde's interest in original rock music did not fit in with what Miller wanted to do, which was traditional blues. In an interview, Miller claimed that he told Hynde she would "probably have to go to Europe to get anyone to listen to you."

== Release ==
"Precious" was first released on the band's 1979 album Pretenders. It was the opening track of the album. "Precious" was also released as a single in some countries, such as the Netherlands and Spain. A medley of "Precious" with "Brass in Pocket" and "Mystery Achievement" reached number 28 on the Dance Music/Club Play Singles chart.

A live version of "Precious" was included on the 1981 EP Extended Play. Village Voice critic Robert Christgau considered the live version even better than the original. Mason also praised the live version. A demo version from 1978 was included on the 2006 album Pirate Radio. Erlewine stated that this demo version was "nearly as tough" as the officially released version. "Precious" was later included on the 2009 compilation album The Best of Pretenders.

== Reception ==
Author Mike Segretto described "Precious" as being "particularly ferocious." Author Tom Moon called it an "enduring gem." Ultimate Classic Rock critic Matt Wardlaw rated it the Pretenders 6th greatest song, saying that "Chrissie spits out the lyrics with a sexually venomous feel that brings extra punch to what is one of the Pretenders' best barn-burning rockers." Ultimate Classic Rock critic Bryan Wawzenek rated it one of drummer Martin Chambers' top 10 Pretenders songs, saying that "Chambers’ rampant pounding is as strong as Chrissie Hynde's will and as sharp as her tongue. His restrained power lays down the perfect foundation for Hynde to jackhammer."
