= Lovebreak =

Single by Tube & Berger featuring Milan Euringer
- Released: 11 September 2012
- Genre: Deep house
- Length: 6:14
- Label: Kittball

Tube & Berger featuring Milan Euringer singles chronology
"Straight Ahead" (2004)	"Lovebreak" (2012)

"Lovebreak" is a song by German deep house duo Tube & Berger. It features Milan Euringer. The remixes EP was released on 21 April 2014.

== Track listing ==
Singles
No.	Title	Length
1.	"Lovebreak"	6:14

Lovebreak Remixed (Remixes) - EP
No.	Title	Length
1.	"Lovebreak" (Betoko & Sam H3 Remix)	8:46
2.	"Lovebreak" (Wild Culture Remix)	6:02
3.	"Lovebreak" (Simone Vitullo Remix)	7:50
4.	"Lovebreak" (In.Deed Remix)	6:24

== Charts ==
Chart	Peak position
Belgium (Ultratip Flanders)	56
