= Valve Bone Woe =

Studio album by Chrissie Hynde
- Released: September 6, 2019
- Recorded: 2019
- Studio: Air Studios; Sarm Studios; (London)
- Genre: Jazz
- Length: 65:55
- Label: BMG Rights Management
- Producer: Marius de Vries; Eldad Guetta

Chrissie Hynde chronology
| Stockholm (2014) | Valve Bone Woe (2019) | Standing in the Doorway: Chrissie Hynde Sings Bob Dylan (2021) |

Valve Bone Woe is the second solo studio album by American singer-songwriter Chrissie Hynde. The album consists entirely of cover versions, and was released on September 6, 2019, by BMG Rights Management. The jazz-influenced album features 14 renditions from a wide variety of artists, including Frank Sinatra, the Beach Boys, Nick Drake, John Coltrane and more. The album was generally received well by critics.

== Background ==
The genesis of the album began in 1999 when Chrissie Hynde teamed up with composer and producer Marius de Vries to work on music for the film Eye of the Beholder. Hynde writes in the album's liner notes: "After we'd recorded "I Wish You Love" for the Eye of the Beholder soundtrack I'd often expressed a desire to do more along those lines. What eventually emerged was the idea to do what we refer to as our jazz/dub album."

The majority of the album was recorded at London's Air Studios with additional vocals recorded at Sarm Studios in London. Although the album includes two instrumentals: Charles Mingus' "Meditation on a Pair of Wire Cutters" and John Coltrane's "Naima", Hynde features on wordless background vocals on both tracks.

== Album title ==
In the album's liner notes, Hynde writes about the album title: "A few years back when I saw an obit in the paper for the valve trombonist, Bob Brookmeyer, I mailed my jazz sax-playing brother, saying "R. I. P. Bob Brookmeyer." Terry, a man of few words, responded with "Valve Bone Woe," a kind of Haiku beatnik prose. I thought that was a perfect title for the album."

== Critical reception ==
Professional ratings
Aggregate scores
| Source | Rating |
|---|---|
| Metacritic | 77/100 |
Review scores
| Source | Rating |
| AllMusic | 4/5 stars |
| American Songwriter | 4/5 stars |
| The Guardian | 4/5 stars |
| The Independent | 4/5 stars |
| musicOMH | 3/5 stars |
| The Skinny | 3/5 stars |

Valve Bone Woe received generally positive reviews from critics. At Metacritic, which assigns a normalized rating out of 100 to reviews from critics, the album received an average score of 77, which indicates "generally favorable reviews", based on 11 reviews.

Stephen Thomas Erlewine, writing for AllMusic, wrote, "Most of Valve Bone Woe sways to a soft, gentle beat and is dressed in elegant strings, keyboards, and other jazzy accouterments, but beneath this lush exterior lies some modern flair. Hints of studio trickery are peppered throughout the record, most evident in elongated electronic echoes, and far from seeming out of place, they lend the album a certain sense of hipness." Rich Wilhelm of PopMatters said, "It could be a jazz album, or a mood music album, or a covers album, or a wee-small-hours-of-the-morning album ... These descriptions all work, and yet Valve Bone Woe doesn't fit comfortably into any of those categories ... But with its orchestral ambitions, imaginative song selection, and sometimes unexpected sonic architecture, Valve Bone Woe is a supremely odd journey as well."

The Guardian's Rachel Aroesti wrote that Valve Bone Woe "sees Hynde drown out cliche (and, occasionally, any recognisable tune) with her inbuilt insouciant cool and disregard for anything approaching stuffy tradition. Alongside jazz, she calls on dub, psychedelia and faintly disorientating interludes of electronica to enhance the otherworldliness of her alternative American songbook."

Matt Silver, writing for WRTI, wrote that the tracks not originally composed as jazz tunes are given "something close enough to qualify as jazz treatment, but, as a whole, this is as genre-fluid and idiosyncratic a collection of jazz and pop covers as any in recent memory." Silver felt that Hynde "deserves recognition for an audacious approach to her first jazz album. She takes some bold chances; some land, others don't, and still others may prove to be tastes acquired over time."

== Track listing ==
Valve Bone Woe track listing
| No. | Title | Writer(s) | Original artist | Length |
|---|---|---|---|---|
| 1. | "How Glad I Am" | Larry Harrison; Jimmy Williams | Nancy Wilson (1964) | 4:38 |
| 2. | "Caroline, No" | Tony Asher; Brian Wilson | Brian Wilson / The Beach Boys (1966) | 4:53 |
| 3. | "I'm a Fool to Want You" | Joel Herron; Frank Sinatra; Jack Wolf | Frank Sinatra (1951) | 5:57 |
| 4. | "I Get Along Without You Very Well (Except Sometimes)" | Hoagy Carmichael | Red Norvo / Larry Clinton (1939) | 2:59 |
| 5. | "Meditation on a Pair of Wire Cutters" | Charles Mingus | Charles Mingus (1966) | 3:20 |
| 6. | "Once I Loved" | Ray Gilbert (Note: Norman Gimbel is erroneously credited as co-writer in the album liner notes instead of Ray Gilbert.); Antônio Carlos Jobim; Vinícius de Moraes | João Gilberto (1961) | 4:18 |
| 7. | "Wild Is the Wind" | Dimitri Tiomkin; Ned Washington | Johnny Mathis (1957) | 5:46 |
| 8. | "You Don't Know What Love Is" | Gene de Paul; Don Raye | Keep 'Em Flying / Carol Bruce (1941) | 4:49 |
| 9. | "River Man" | Nick Drake | Nick Drake (1969) | 4:37 |
| 10. | "Absent Minded Me" | Bob Merrill; Jule Styne | Barbra Streisand (1964) | 5:51 |
| 11. | "Naima" | John Coltrane | John Coltrane (1960) | 5:20 |
| 12. | "Hello, Young Lovers" | Oscar Hammerstein II; Richard Rodgers | The King and I (1951) | 4:29 |
| 13. | "No Return" | Ray Davies | The Kinks (1967) | 4:17 |
| 14. | "Que reste-t-il de nos amours?" | Charles Trenet; Léo Chauliac; (Note: Credited to just Charles Trenet in the album liner notes, however, some sources list Léo Chauliac as co-writer.) | Lucienne Boyer (1942) | 4:40 |
| Total length: | | | | 65:55 |

== Personnel ==
Adapted from the album's liner notes.

Musicians

- Chrissie Hynde – vocals
- James Walbourne – guitars (all tracks)
- Liran Donin – bass (except on track 13)
- David Hartley – piano, Rhodes (except on tracks 7 and 12)
- Ian Thomas – drums (except on tracks 4, 5, 10, 11 and 13)
- Eldad Guetta – keyboards, guitars, trumpet, bass, percussion, arrangements
- Marius de Vries – synthesizer, piano, arrangements
- Matt Robertson – additional keyboards, programming, additional arrangements
- Peter Roth – nylon string guitar
- Marcel Camargo – nylon string guitar (on track 4)
- Georgi Minassyan – duduk (on track 5)
- Tal Wilkenfeld – bass (on track 13)
- Ben de Vries – additional programming
- with members of the Valve Bone Woe Orchestra (except on track 7)

Technical

- Marius de Vries – production
- Eldad Guetta – production
- Tom Bailey – engineering (Air Studios)
- Dave McCracken – engineering (Sarm Studios)
- Jay Marcovitz – digital editing
- Phil Levine – digital editing
- Nicholai Baxter – mixing
- Eric Boulanger – mastering
- Chrissie Hynde – cover illustration
- Stuart Crouch Creative – design

== Charts ==
Chart performance for Valve Bone Woe
| Chart (2019) | Peak position |
|---|---|
| Belgian Albums (Ultratop Wallonia) | 188 |
| German Albums (Offizielle Top 100) | 79 |
| Portuguese Albums (AFP) | 47 |
| Scottish Albums (OCC) | 12 |
| Spanish Albums (PROMUSICAE) | 57 |
| Swiss Albums (Schweizer Hitparade) | 77 |
| UK Albums (OCC) | 32 |
| UK Jazz & Blues Albums (OCC) | 1 |
| US Independent Albums (Billboard) | 19 |
| US Top Jazz Albums (Billboard) | 2 |
