= Reckless: My Life as a Pretender =

Memoir by Chrissie Hynde

- Author: Chrissie Hynde
- Language: English
- Genre: Memoir
- Publisher: Doubleday
- Publication date: 2015
- Publication place: United States
- Pages: 312
- ISBN: 978-0-385-54061-2

Reckless: My Life as a Pretender is a memoir by the American musician Chrissie Hynde, a member of the rock band The Pretenders. The book was published on September 8, 2015 by Doubleday, New York and London. In it, Hynde documents her childhood and youth in the Midwest, the founding of The Pretenders, life on the road and interactions with other musicians.

== Critical reception ==
Alan Light of The New York Times reviewed the book on November 20, 2015, describing Hynde's journey in the rock world as a rough ride with few regrets. He notes that Reckless was written without a co-author and describes her writing style as clever, humorous and confrontational. The Guardian also reviewed the book, describing Hynde's lifestyle as androgynous, rebellious and fierce. The Washington Post also reviewed the book, stating that it lacks the charm and exquisiteness of other recent musician's memoirs, yet it "out-rocks them all." The book was also reviewed by the Boston Globe, Los Angeles Times, The Independent and others.

Hynde was interviewed about the book by Emily Maitlis on the Andrew Marr Show on December 13, 2015.

== See also ==
- Women in punk rock
