= Tube & Berger =

German musical duo

- Origin: Germany
- Genres: House; tech house
- Members: Arndt Rörig; Marco Vidovic
- Website: tube-berger.com

Tube & Berger is a German electronic music duo consisting of Arndt Rörig and Marko Vidovic, active since 2000.

== Biography ==
Before producing electronic music, Tube & Berger started out as a punk band. The duo achieved their first international breakthrough in 2004 with their song "Straight Ahead" with Chrissie Hynde from the Pretenders. It reached number one on Billboard's Hot Dance Airplay chart. Since 2005, the duo releases music on their own label Kittball Records, which is managed by DJane Juliet Sikora and themselves. From then on, the duo started touring throughout North and South America, Australia, Asia and Europe.

Their 2012 release "Lovebreak" was the ninth highest-selling deep house track on Beatport, while their 2013 track "Imprint of Pleasure" was the ninth highest tech house track on Beatport. The song reached 37 million plays on YouTube and 32 million streams in Spotify.

In 2017, they played at the Tomorrowland Festival in Belgium.

Their second album, We Are All Stars was released on their own label Kittball Records in 2017. A remix edition of the album was released soon after, with contributions from artists such as Amine Edge & D.A.N.C.E, Juliet Sikora, Illyus & Barrientos, Rene Amesz, Dennis Cruz, Teenage Mutants and Format: B. In 2018, the duo had multiple week long tours throughout Australia, the U.S., Canada and South America.

In collaboration with Junior Jack, the duo released the track "E Samba 2018" which was a number one in Germany's Club Charts (DCC). Furthermore, the track was number one in Beatport's house charts for 6 weeks and was Beatport's fourth most sold house track of 2018. Remixes for this track were released soon after, with contributions from Kellerkind and Josh Butler.

In 2019, their remix of Samim's "Heater" was a number one in Germany's Club Charts (DCC) as well as on Beatport's overall Top 100.

== Discography ==
=== Charted singles ===
Title	Year	Peak chart positions					
Title	Year	AUS	BEL	NL	UK	US Airplay	US Club
"Straight Ahead" (featuring Chrissie Hynde)	2003	56	9	63	29	1	4
"Lovebreak" (featuring Milan Euringer)	2012	—	56	—	—	—	—
"Come On Now (Set It Off)" (with Juliet Sikora)	2013	—	39	19	—	—	—
"—" denotes a recording that did not chart or was not released.
