= Logan String Melody =

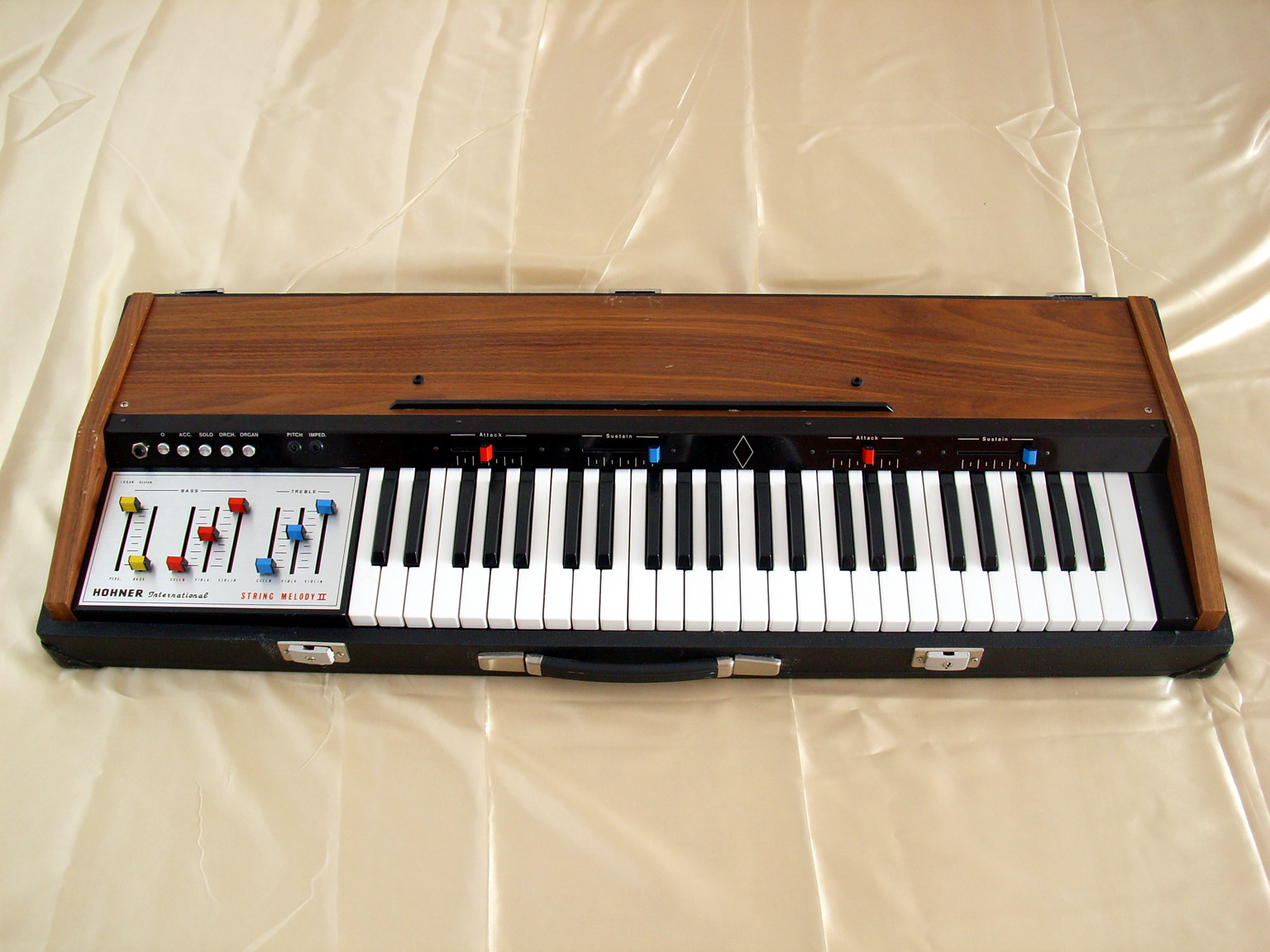
Logan String Melody II

The Logan String Melody was a portable analogue electric keyboard produced by Logan in two versions from 1973 to 1982. Designed by Ing. Giuliano Costantin and manufactured in Italy, it was sold under both the Logan brand name and re-badged as both a Hohner and Vox product. The Vox version was called The String Thing but still featured the Logan brand name on the back of the case.

The keyboard consists of four octaves split into two nearly equal sized ranges. In each of these ranges a combination of three string sounds can be mixed using faders labelled Cello, Viola and Violin. Each string sound is pitched one octave apart. In addition to the separate sets of faders for the string sounds, each range has a sustain and release fader. The lower range also features a simple monophonic synthesiser that is controlled from using faders labelled Bass and Perc.

On the first version, there is a button labelled Orchestra that has hard wired settings and disables the faders for the string sounds. The second version, the String Melody II introduced in 1977, added more buttons for further hard wired settings.

== Technical ==
It came in a heavy wooden case and weighed 23 kilograms. It has full polyphony with a variable-gain amplifier for each key and a BBD (bucket-brigade device) ensemble effect that gives it the distinctive string synthesizer sound. Sound production begins at a high frequency square wave generator, then flows to the frequency divider, a Mostek MK50240N integrated circuit for the highest octave. These top octave frequency dividers were commonly used in electronic organs of the period. The lower octaves are divided by nine 7-stage SAJ210 dividers. The square wave passes the variable-gain amplifier built as a CV/Gate and a pulse conversion. Then the sound travels to the mixer, the ensemble effect, a presence filter and the output stage.

The monophonic bass sound available on the lower half of the keyboard has no variable-gain amplifier but has a low-pass filter.

The percussion bass is low filtered and has an attack of 30ms and a decay of 700ms, with no release. A simple gate variable-gain amplifier is used with a 47 μF capacitor, and the filter is behind it.

The ensemble effect consists of two modules – a dual low-frequency oscillator and the triple delay-line oscillator. The low-frequency oscillator puts out 0.6 Hz and 6 Hz mixed together as a tri-phase of the low-frequency oscillation to the delay-line oscillator. The delay-line oscillator consists of three TCA350 circuits – a chain of 185 MOS double transistor stages, which samples the audio signal, which is then modulated (FM) by the dual LFO so the output samples are shorter or longer.
