= Extended Play (Pretenders EP) =

EP by Pretenders
- Released: 30 March 1981
- Recorded: 1980–81
- Genre: Rock
- Length: 17:45
- Label: Sire
- Producer: Chris Thomas

Pretenders chronology
Pretenders (1980)	Extended Play (1981)	Pretenders II (1981)

Professional ratings
Review scores
Source	Rating
AllMusic	3.5/5 stars
Robert Christgau	B+
The Rolling Stone Album Guide	3.5/5 stars

Extended Play is a 1981 EP released by new wave band The Pretenders. "Message of Love" and "Talk of the Town" featured on this EP were also included on their second album, Pretenders II, released later the same year. "Porcelain" and "Cuban Slide", outtakes from their Pretenders debut album, were included on disc two of the 2006 and 2021 remastered editions of their debut album and on the Pirate Radio box set. The live version of "Precious" on this EP, recorded at their New York Central Park performance on 30 August 1980, was finally released on CD on November 5, 2021. The booklet for disc one of the Pretenders debut album from the 2015 UK Edsel/Rhino Records box set 1979–1999 incorrectly states "Precious" (track 17) is from that Central Park performance. Instead, the box set version is from their Boston performance of 23 March 1980; it is also included on disc two of the 2006 remastered edition of Pretenders.

This EP was released in the US, and also in Australia, but not in the UK. In the UK, the tracks were released as the singles "Message of Love" b/w "Porcelain" and "Talk of the Town" b/w "Cuban Slide". "Precious" is unique to this release.

"Message of Love" contains the line: "We are all of us in the gutter, but some of us are looking at the stars" from the Oscar Wilde play Lady Windermere's Fan.

== Track listing ==
All songs written by Chrissie Hynde, except where noted.

=== Side one ===
1. "Message of Love" – 3:24
2. "Talk of the Town" – 2:42
3. "Porcelain" – 3:53

=== Side two ===
1. "Cuban Slide" (Hynde, Honeyman-Scott) – 4:29
2. "Precious" (Live in Central Park, 30 August 1980) – 3:17

== Personnel ==
The Pretenders

- Chrissie Hynde – rhythm guitar, lead vocals, backing vocals
- Pete Farndon – bass guitar, backing vocals
- Martin Chambers – drums, backing vocals
- James Honeyman-Scott – lead guitar, keyboards, backing vocals

== Charts ==
=== Weekly charts ===
Chart (1981)	Peak position
Australia Albums (Kent Music Report)	29
US Billboard 200	27

=== Year-end charts ===
Chart (1981)	Position
US Billboard 200	93
