= Message of Love =

Single by The Pretenders

from the album Pretenders II
- B-side: "Porcelain"
- Released: 6 February 1981
- Recorded: 1980
- Studio: Pathe Marconi Studios (Paris, France)
- Genre: Rock; new wave
- Length: 3:27
- Label: Real; Sire (US)
- Songwriter(s): Chrissie Hynde
- Producer(s): Chris Thomas

The Pretenders singles chronology
"Talk of the Town" (1980)	"Message of Love" (1981)	"Day After Day" (1981)

Music video
- "Message of Love" on YouTube

"Message of Love" is a song written by Chrissie Hynde and performed by the Pretenders. Released first as a single and then on the Pretenders' 1981 EP Extended Play, it was later re-released on the band's 1981 album Pretenders II.

A band effort largely composed in the studio, the song was a radio hit and reached number 11 in the United Kingdom. It has since been praised by critics as a highlight of Pretenders II.

== Background ==
According to drummer Martin Chambers, the song was largely formed in the studio based on a rough sketch presented by Hynde. Chambers explained, "We never really got into the studio without any rehearsal and record[ed] a song, [but] we have done that once and that was 'Message of Love'. ... [Hynde] likes to come to [the band] when she has [a song] finished in her mind ... but this time she hadn't really finished it and so we just ... rehearsed it already set up in the studio and it was on tape in two hours, basically." The song, as bassist Pete Farndon said, initially featured multiple sound effects (among them were sounds of car accidents recorded by the band on Paris streets) but most of them were removed from the final released version.

"Message of Love", one of the first songs created following Pretenders, was recorded in Paris. At the time of the creation of Pretenders II, Hynde found confidence in the song's radio success, saying "I knew that people still liked us and we were getting airplay with 'Message of Love', 'Talk of the Town', [and] 'I Go to Sleep'".

== Music and lyrics ==
Described by Stewart Mason of Allmusic as a "fairly standard rocker", "Message of Love" features a "a stop-start beat ... with skittering snare fills that give the song a paradoxically driving rhythm." The song was characterized by Allmusic's Stephen Thomas Erlewine as a "tough" rocker. Lyrically, the song features, as described by Mason, "undistinguished 'love power' lyrics". The song quotes Oscar Wilde with the lyric, "We are all of us in the gutter, but some of us are looking at the stars".

== Release and reception ==
"Message of Love" was initially released as a single in February 1981. The B-side of the single was "Porcelain" (another Extended Play track). The single was a top 20 hit in the United Kingdom, entering the charts at number 28 and peaking at number 11 in its second week on the charts. The single also saw some success in the United States, reaching number five on the Mainstream Rock chart and number 44 on the Dance Club chart. The song was also released on the band's Extended Play in March 1981. In late 1981, the song was re-released on the band's second studio album, Pretenders II.

Stewart Mason of Allmusic praised the performances of bassist Pete Farndon and drummer Martin Chambers on the song and described the track as "unfairly overlooked by all but the Pretenders' biggest fans." Sean Murphy of PopMatters said that the song, along with fellow Pretenders II singles "Talk of the Town" and "Day After Day", "richly deserve their rotation on less imaginative DJ's play lists". Greg Kot of the Chicago Tribune called it a "fine single".

Ultimate Classic Rock critic Bryan Wawzenek rated it as drummer Martin Chambers' 3rd best Pretenders songs, saying that "He gets to swing and slam on this monstrous Pretenders song; he might as well be playing a lead instrument."

== Chart history ==
Chart (1981)	Peak position
Australia (Kent Music Report)	15
Ireland (IRMA)	9
Netherlands	33
UK Singles Chart	11
US Billboard Top Rock Tracks	5
US Billboard Dance/Disco	44

== See also ==
- Brigitte Bardot
