= Talk of the Town (Pretenders song) =

Single by The Pretenders

from the album Pretenders II
- B-side: "Cuban Slide"; "Stop Your Sobbing" (US)
- Released: March 1980
- Recorded: 1980
- Studio: Pathe Marconi Studios (Paris, France)
- Genre: New wave; jangle pop
- Length: 3:14
- Label: Real; Sire (US)
- Songwriter: Chrissie Hynde
- Producer: Chris Thomas

The Pretenders singles chronology
"Precious" (1980)	"Talk of the Town" (1980)	"Message of Love" (1981)

Music video
- "Talk of the Town" on YouTube

"Talk of the Town" is a song written by Chrissie Hynde and performed by the Pretenders. Released first as a single and then on the Pretenders' 1981 EP Extended Play, a slightly shortened version of the song was included on the band's 1981 album Pretenders II.

Inspired by a London nightclub and a fan of the band, the song was a radio hit and reached number 8 in the United Kingdom. It has since been praised by critics as a highlight of Pretenders II.

== Background ==
"Talk of the Town" was inspired by a fan Chrissie Hynde had encountered on the band's first tour. She explained in a BBC Songwriters' Circle special, "I had in mind this kid who used to stand outside the soundchecks on our first tour... I never spoke to him. I remember that the last time I saw him I just left him standing in the snow, I never had anything to say to him. I kind of wrote this for him, so, in the unlikely event that you're watching this, I did think about you." It was also rumored that the song was written about Kinks frontman Ray Davies, whom Hynde would date and have a child with. The title itself was inspired by a London nightclub of the same name.

"Talk of the Town", one of the first songs written following the Pretenders album, was recorded in Paris. At the time of the creation of Pretenders II, Hynde found confidence in the song's radio success, saying "I knew that people still liked us and we were getting airplay with 'Message of Love', 'Talk of the Town', [and] 'I Go to Sleep'".

== Release ==
"Talk of the Town" was initially released as a single in March 1980. It was a top 10 hit in the United Kingdom, entering the charts at number 21 and peaking at number 8 in its third week on the charts. The B-side of the single in most territories was "Cuban Slide", but in the United States it was the band's previous single, "Stop Your Sobbing".

The song was also released on the band's US release Extended Play in March 1981—alongside "Cuban Slide"—and later that year was included on the band's second studio album, Pretenders II.

== Reception and legacy ==
"Talk of the Town" has generally received positive reception, often being singled out as a highlight from Pretenders II. Tom Carson of Rolling Stone lauded the song, writing, "What's so wonderful about 'Talk of the Town,' for example, is how beautifully she grasps the rapturousness of success: she's the girl who got left behind, but she's also the boy who's changed his place in the world, and we understand them both". Matthew Greenwald of Allmusic said, "Between the breezy melody and literate, confessional lyrics, this song is head and shoulders above what passed for a pop single at the beginning of the '80s, and remains a classic of Hynde's."

Sean Murphy of Pop Matters said that the song, along with fellow Pretenders II singles "Message of Love" and "Day After Day", "richly deserve their rotation on less imaginative DJ's play lists". Greg Kot of the Chicago Tribune called it a "fine single" while Dennis Lim of Blender praised it as "tender". Ultimate Classic Rock critic Matt Wardlaw rated it the Pretenders 5th greatest song."

== Charts ==
Chart (1980)	Peak position
Australia (Kent Music Report)	55
Ireland (IRMA)	14
Netherlands (Single Top 100)	24
UK Singles (Official Charts)	8
