= Pretenders II =

Studio album by the Pretenders
- Released: 7 August 1981
- Recorded: 1980–81
- Studio: Wessex Sound, London; Pathe Marconi, Paris, France
- Genre: New wave; punk rock; jangle pop
- Length: 46:11
- Label: Sire
- Producer: Chris Thomas

The Pretenders chronology
Extended Play (1981)	Pretenders II (1981)	Learning to Crawl (1984)

Singles from Pretenders II
- 1. "Talk of the Town" Released: March 1980; 2. "Message of Love" Released: February 1981; 3. "Day After Day" Released: August 1981 (UK); 4. "Louie, Louie" Released: August 1981 (US); 5. "I Go to Sleep" Released: November 1981

Professional ratings
Review scores
Source	Rating
AllMusic	4/5 stars
The Austin Chronicle	4/5 stars
Blender	4/5 stars
Chicago Tribune	2.5/4 stars
Christgau's Record Guide	B+
PopMatters	9/10
Rolling Stone	4/5 stars
The Rolling Stone Album Guide	3/5 stars
Spin Alternative Record Guide	6/10
Uncut	8/10

Pretenders II is the second studio album by British rock band the Pretenders, issued on Sire Records in August 1981. It incorporates two songs that had been released as singles in the UK and placed on an EP in the US. It peaked at No. 7 on the UK Albums Chart and No. 10 on the Billboard 200, and has been certified a gold record for sales by the RIAA. It is the final album by the original line-up, as the following year bassist Pete Farndon was dismissed and guitarist James Honeyman-Scott died in the same week. Farndon died in 1983, and a new line-up would make the band's next album, Learning to Crawl.

== History ==
The success of their 1979 debut album created a great demand for more material from the fledgling band; however, a lack of songs precluded the quick release of a follow-up album. In the UK, the band released two hit singles in 1980 and early 1981, "Talk of the Town" followed by "Message of Love". In the US, where standalone singles had become rare, these tracks were combined with three others for a stopgap extended play release in March 1981 simply titled Extended Play. Pretenders II was released two months later to mixed critical reception arguably because many of the songs were viewed as too similar to (though not quite as groundbreaking as) the band's debut. Nevertheless, several of the album's songs became hits and the album has increased in critical stature with time.

As on their previous album, the band includes a song by Ray Davies of The Kinks, although in this case "I Go to Sleep", written by Davies in 1965, was not recorded by the group. Band leader Chrissie Hynde and Davies were in a relationship at the time of the album's recording, and would eventually have a daughter, Natalie Rae Hynde, in 1983. "Talk of the Town", though rumoured to be about her relationship with Davies, was inspired by a fan Hynde had encountered on the band's first tour and whom she regretted not speaking to at the time.

The album also includes the sexually-forward tunes "Bad Boys Get Spanked" and "The Adultress", with perhaps the album's most ambitious track, "Day After Day" spinning a common second-album narrative of unaccustomed celebrity, with the band rushing from gig to gig, hotel to hotel, head-spun from the swiftness of it all. The single version of the song ends with a guitar solo that gradually fades out; the album edit ends suddenly, mid-solo, with the sound of a crashing fighter plane. The album's final track, "Louie, Louie", is an original composition and not a version of the identically titled and often covered song by Richard Berry.

In 2000 it was voted number 403 in Colin Larkin's All Time Top 1000 Albums. The following year, twenty years after its release, it was certified gold in the United States.

== Reissues ==
Rhino released a re-mastered edition of Pretenders II in 2006, including a second disc of live tracks and outtakes. Most of the tracks on the bonus disc originally appeared as a Warner Bros. 1982 promotional live album, Pretenders Live at the Santa Monica Civic. Specialist label Mobile Fidelity Sound Labs (known as MFSL or MoFi) released a re-mastered version in 2010. The track listing, however, reverted to that of the original release, without bonus tracks. A further 2015 reissue repeated the original album plus bonus disc of the 2006 version with two additional bonus tracks, this time including a DVD containing four promotional videos and two appearances by the band on Top of the Pops.

Another deluxe edition of the album, curated by Hynde, was released on 5 November 2021, and featured the original album remastered by Chris Thomas, alongside demos, rarities, and two live performances. One is from a performance in Central Park, New York City, and the other from an electric performance at The Santa Monica Civic.

== Track listing ==
All tracks are written by Chrissie Hynde except where noted. Tracks 1–15 on the reissue bonus disc were recorded at the Santa Monica Civic Auditorium 4 September 1981.

Side one
No.	Title	Writer(s)	Length
1.	"The Adultress"		3:55
2.	"Bad Boys Get Spanked"		4:04
3.	"Message of Love"		3:26
4.	"I Go to Sleep"	Ray Davies	2:55
5.	"Birds of Paradise"		4:14
6.	"Talk of the Town" (album version)		2:45

Side two
No.	Title	Writer(s)	Length
1.	"Pack It Up"	Chrissie Hynde; James Honeyman-Scott	3:50
2.	"Waste Not Want Not"		3:43
3.	"Day After Day"	Hynde; Honeyman-Scott	3:45
4.	"Jealous Dogs"		5:36
5.	"The English Roses"		4:28
6.	"Louie Louie"		3:30

2006 reissue bonus disc
No.	Title	Writer(s)	Length
1.	"The Wait" (previously issued on Pretenders Live at the Santa Monica Civic)	Hynde; Pete Farndon	3:23
2.	"The Adultress" (previously issued on Pretenders Live at the Santa Monica Civic)		4:07
3.	"Message of Love" (previously issued on Pretenders Live at the Santa Monica Civic)		3:28
4.	"Louie Louie" (US b-side to "I Go to Sleep")		3:50
5.	"Talk of the Town" (previously issued on Pretenders Live at the Santa Monica Civic)		3:27
6.	"Birds of Paradise" (previously issued on Pretenders Live at the Santa Monica Civic)		4:27
7.	"The English Roses" (UK b-side to "I Go to Sleep")		4:51
8.	"Up the Neck" (previously issued on Pretenders Live at the Santa Monica Civic)		6:16
9.	"Bad Boys Get Spanked" (previously issued on Pretenders Live at the Santa Monica Civic)		3:19
10.	"Stop Your Sobbing" (previously issued on Pretenders Live at the Santa Monica Civic)	Davies	3:46
11.	"Private Life" (previously issued on Pretenders Live at the Santa Monica Civic)		7:04
12.	"Kid" (previously issued on Pretenders Live at the Santa Monica Civic)		3:48
13.	"Day After Day" (previously issued on Pretenders Live at the Santa Monica Civic)	Hynde; Honeyman-Scott	4:41
14.	"Brass in Pocket" (previously unreleased)	Hynde; Honeyman-Scott	3:28
15.	"(Your Love Keeps Lifting Me) Higher and Higher" (previously issued on Pretenders Live at the Santa Monica Civic)	Gary Jackson; Raynard Miner; Carl Smith	4:24
16.	"Talk of the Town" (previously unreleased Free Range studio demo 21 December 1979)		2:49
17.	"I Go to Sleep" (previously unreleased guitar version)	Davies	2:59
18.	"Pack It Up" (previously unreleased radio mix)		3:50

== Personnel ==
The Pretenders

- Chrissie Hynde – vocals, rhythm guitars
- James Honeyman-Scott – lead and rhythm guitars, keyboards, backing vocals
- Pete Farndon – bass guitar, backing vocals
- Martin Chambers – drums, backing vocals

Additional personnel

- Chris Mercer – tenor saxophone
- Henry Lowther, Jim Wilson – trumpets
- Jeff Bryant – French horn
- Chris Thomas – sound effects

Technical

- Chris Thomas – production
- Bill Price – recording
- Gavin Cochrane – front cover photography

== Charts ==
Chart (1981)	Peak position
Australia (Kent Music Report)	18
UK Albums Chart	7
US Billboard 200	10

== Certifications ==
Region	Certification	Certified units/sales
United Kingdom (BPI)	Silver	60,000^{^}
United States (RIAA)	Gold	500,000^{^}
^{^} Shipments figures based on certification alone.
