= Pete Farndon =

English bassist (1952–1983)

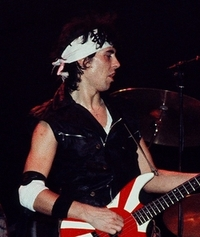
- Farndon in December 1981

Background information
- Born: Peter Granville Farndon; 12 June 1952; Hereford, England
- Died: 14 April 1983 (aged 30) London, England
- Genres: Rock; new wave
- Occupation: Musician
- Instruments: Bass; vocals
- Years active: 1976–1983
- Formerly of: The Pretenders

Peter Granville Farndon (12 June 1952 – 14 April 1983) was an English bassist and founding member of the rock band the Pretenders. In addition to playing bass with the group, Farndon sang backup vocals and co-wrote two of the group's songs ("The Wait" and "Space Invader"), before a drug problem resulted in his dismissal from the group in 1982 and his death less than a year later.

== Career ==
Farndon attended Hereford Cathedral School in his home city Hereford before embarking on his musical career. His musical influences included Stanley Clarke and Jeff Beck. Farndon played with Cold River Lady until the middle of 1976, and then toured with Australian folk-rock band The Bushwackers in 1978.

Farndon joined the Pretenders in early 1978 and was the first member of the 1978–82 lineup to be recruited by Chrissie Hynde. Farndon recalled their first rehearsal: "I'll never forget it, we go in, we do a soul number, we do a country and western number, and then we did 'The Phone Call' which is like the heaviest fuckin' punk rocker you could do in 5/4 time. Impressed? I was very impressed." A guitarist was still needed, and Farndon recruited lead guitarist James Honeyman-Scott into the group that summer. Farndon, Honeyman-Scott, and bandmate Martin Chambers all hailed from Hereford.

Chambers worked with Farndon to adjust to Hynde's timing: "Pete and I did a fair amount of work on our own, in terms of the rhythm section being able to play Chrissie's odd timing things. So Pete and I would come in a couple of hours ahead of the others and baby talk our way through the songs. You know, 'da dad da, boom boom.' She didn't count in the traditional way so we had to reinterpret the counts. Once we made the adjustment and learned to go with her flow, so to speak, it became second nature. It's the bedrock of Pretenders music."

Farndon played a large role in shaping the Pretenders' tough image, often wearing his biker clothing or, later, samurai gear on stage. Hynde later acknowledged that two Pretenders songs, "Biker" and "Samurai" had "references to a Pete Farndon type of character". As a performer, Hynde recalled, "Pete was fantastic. Pete was blagging it a lot because technically he wasn't any kind of great musician. But he had real heart, like in boxing terms, he could win the fight on heart alone. And he had a great energy, born of a kind of desperation."

By early 1982, Farndon's drug use was causing strained relations with his bandmates. He became increasingly belligerent and, according to Hynde, "was in bad shape. He was really not someone you could work with." The situation came to a head when guitarist James Honeyman-Scott threatened to quit the band if Farndon was not fired. On 14 June 1982, band manager Dave Hill, on the orders of Hynde, fired Farndon. Two days after Farndon's dismissal, Honeyman-Scott was found dead of heart failure caused by a cocaine overdose. Four years into the career of the Pretenders, Hynde and drummer Martin Chambers were the only original members left, and less than a year later, the only two living members.

After his dismissal from the Pretenders, Farndon worked with former Clash drummer Topper Headon, guitarist Henry Padovani, organist Mick Gallagher, and vocalist Steve Allen (formerly of Deaf School) in a short-lived band they called Samurai.

== Death ==
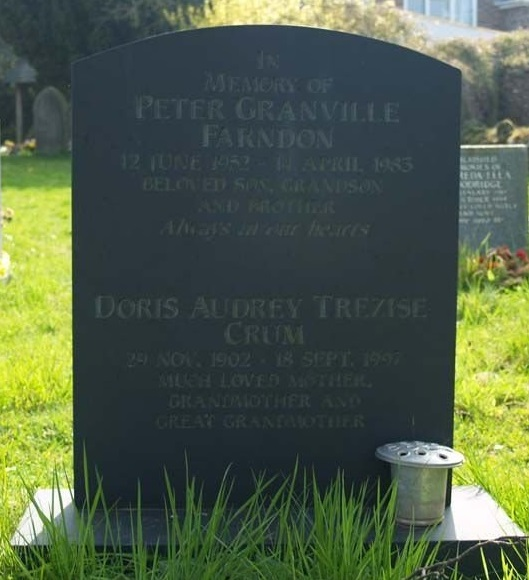
Farndon gravesite

On 14 April 1983, at the age of 30, Farndon was found by his wife drowned in the bath at his home in London, having lost consciousness after a heroin overdose. He is buried at St Peter's Church, Withington, Herefordshire.

== Discography ==
The Bushwackers

- 1977 – Murrumbidgee

The Pretenders

- 1979 – Pretenders
- 1981 – Extended Play
- 1981 – Pretenders II
