= I Go to Sleep =

1965 song by Ray Davies

Song by Ray Davies

from the album Kinda Kinks (CD remaster)
- Released: April 1998
- Recorded: 24 May 1965
- Studio: Regent Sound, London
- Length: 2:42
- Label: Essential
- Songwriter: Ray Davies
- Producer: Shel Talmy

Official audio
- "I Go to Sleep" on YouTube

"I Go to Sleep" is a song written by Ray Davies which has been covered by numerous artists. Peggy Lee, the Applejacks and Cher recorded covers in 1965 without chart success. The Pretenders released a cover in 1981 which reached number seven on the UK Singles Chart. Peggy Lee's cover was used in the title sequence of the 2024 Amazon Prime Video series The Edge of Sleep.

== Ray Davies's demo ==
Ray Davies composed "I Go to Sleep" on 23 May 1965. Working on the piano at his parents' home in Fortis Green, north London, he wrote the song while awaiting news about the birth of his and his wife's first child. The following day, the song was one of seven for which he recorded demos at Regent Sound Studios in central London. (Note: The biographer Doug Hinman hypothesises that all of the demo recordings may have been rushed to tape for potential clients at the Music Publishers Association's First British Song Festival, which was held that same day.) The recording features overdubbed vocals from Davies whilst he plays piano.

The Kinks never formally recorded the song. Band biographer Johnny Rogan considers the lack of a Kinks recording strange, given that the material they recorded around the same time was "obviously inferior". Davies's demo remained unreleased until April 1998, when it appeared as a bonus track on the CD remaster of Kinda Kinks. Sanctuary Records later included it on the 2014 box set The Kinks Anthology 1964–1971.

== Cover versions ==
=== Early covers ===
In June 1965, during the Kinks' first US tour, Davies's song publisher Edward Kassner shopped his song catalogue to various artists. Kassner succeeded in convincing the American jazz singer Peggy Lee to cover "I Go to Sleep", which she recorded backed by a studio orchestra conducted by Sid Feller. Capitol Records included the song on Lee's 1965 album Then Was Then – Now Is Now!, and the label also released it as a single, but it failed to chart. (Note: In a 2012 interview with BBC Radio, Davies suggested that the song was commissioned by Lee, adding that he wrote the song specifically with her voice in mind.)

During the same US tour, after a Kinks show in Philadelphia on 19 June, the singer Mary Wells expressed to Davies a desire to record the song, but he rejected the offer since it had already been promised to Lee. Around 30 June, as the American singer Cher finished recording her debut album at Gold Star Studios, Larry Page convinced her to record the song for that album. The English beat group the Applejacks issued a cover of the song as a single in the UK on 27 August 1965, but it failed to chart.

The German singer Marion (de) (later known as Marion Maerz) covered the song in 1967. Page produced the record in London. The song was released in West Germany and the UK. Marion performed this song as the first and only German female singer in the famous German music program Beat Club.

=== The Pretenders ===
"I Go to Sleep"

Single by the Pretenders

from the album Pretenders II
- B-side: "The English Roses" (live); "Louie Louie" (live)
- Released: 6 November 1981
- Genre: Pop rock; soft rock
- Length: 2:55
- Label: Sire
- Songwriter: Ray Davies
- Producer: Chris Thomas

The Pretenders singles chronology
"Louie Louie" (1981)	"I Go to Sleep" (1981)	"Back on the Chain Gang" (1982)

Music video
- "I Go to Sleep" (Official Music Video) on YouTube

"I Go to Sleep" was covered in 1981 by the Pretenders and released as a single from their second studio album Pretenders II.

"I Go to Sleep" had been rumoured to have been one of the first songs that Chrissie Hynde ever learned. At the time of the song's recording, Hynde had been dating Davies, whom she had met after covering the Kinks track "Stop Your Sobbing". The song features "a very strong late-'50s pop feel and flavor" according to Allmusic's Matthew Greenwald. The song also includes a French horn part; "The French horn in 'I Go to Sleep'…" Hynde recalled, "It's those little embellishments that capture my attention."

Weekly chart performance
Chart (1981–1982)	Peak position
Belgium (Ultratop 50 Flanders)	6
Netherlands (Dutch Top 40)	4
Netherlands (Single Top 100)	9
New Zealand (Recorded Music NZ)	28
UK Singles (OCC)	7

Year-end chart performance
Chart (1982)	Ranking
Belgium (Ultratop Flanders)	83

=== Anika ===
English-German singer Anika covered the song in 2010 for her self-titled debut album, the song was later featured in the first season of Russian Doll.
