= Chrissie Hynde =

American musician (born 1951)

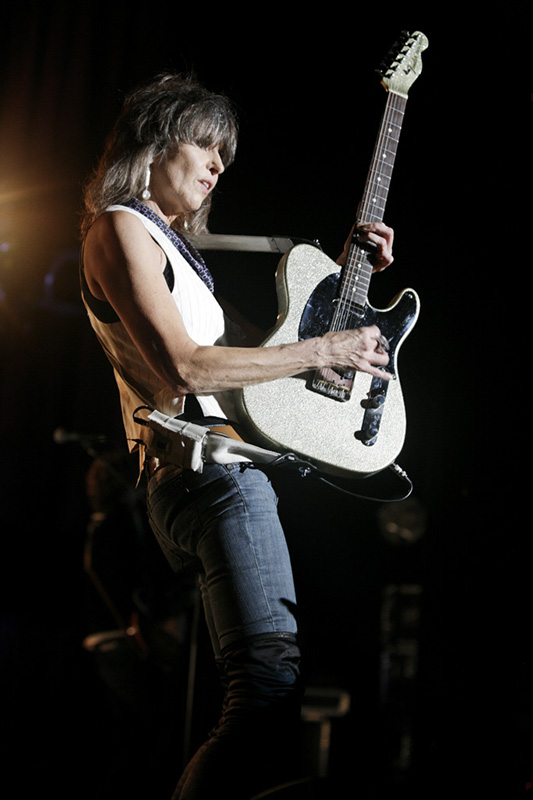
- Hynde in 2013
- Born: Christine Ellen Hynde; September 7, 1951 (age 75); Akron, Ohio, U.S.
- Citizenship: United States; United Kingdom
- Occupations: Singer; songwriter; musician
- Years active: 1975–present
- Spouses: Jim Kerr (m. 1984; div. 1990); Lucho Brieva (m. 1997; div. 2002)
- Children: 2
- Musical career
- Genres: Rock; new wave; punk rock
- Instruments: Vocals; guitar
- Labels: Sire; WEA; Rhino
- Member of: The Pretenders

Christine Ellen Hynde (born September 7, 1951) is an American-British singer, songwriter, and musician. She is a founding member of the rock band the Pretenders and is the band's lead vocalist, guitarist, and primary songwriter. Hynde is the band's only original member and is the only continuous member of the Pretenders, having appeared on every studio album released by the band.

Hynde formed the Pretenders in Hereford, England, in 1978, with Pete Farndon, James Honeyman-Scott, and Martin Chambers. She has also recorded a number of songs with other musicians, including Frank Sinatra, Cher, and UB40. Hynde recorded her first solo album, Stockholm, in 2014. She was inducted into the Rock and Roll Hall of Fame in 2005 as a member of the Pretenders.

== Early life ==
Hynde was born in Akron, Ohio, United States, the daughter of a part-time secretary and a Yellow Pages manager, and grew up in nearby Cuyahoga Falls. She graduated from Firestone High School in Akron but stated: "I was never too interested in high school. I mean, I never went to a dance, I never went out on a date, I never went steady. It became pretty awful for me. Except, of course, I could go see bands, and that was the kick. I used to go to Cleveland just to see any band. So I was in love a lot of the time, but mostly with guys in bands that I had never met. For me, knowing that Brian Jones was out there, and later that Iggy Pop was out there, made it kind of hard for me to get too interested in the guys that were around me. I had, uh, bigger things in mind."

== Early career ==
Hynde became interested in hippie counterculture, Eastern mysticism, and vegetarianism. While attending Kent State University's Art School for three years, she joined Sat. Sun. Mat., a band which included Mark Mothersbaugh, later of Devo. Hynde was also caught up in the Kent State massacre on May 4, 1970, in which the boyfriend of one of her friends was among the four victims.

In May 1973, Hynde moved to London. With her art background, she got a job in an architectural firm, but she left after eight months. She met rock journalist Nick Kent and landed a position at the music magazine NME (New Musical Express), writing what she subsequently described as "half-baked philosophical drivel and nonsensical tirades". Afterwards Hynde got a job at Malcolm McLaren and Vivienne Westwood's clothing store, Sex. Hynde attempted to start a band in France, before her return to Cleveland in 1975, and joined a rhythm and blues group, Jack Rabbit.

After living in Tucson, she returned to France in 1975 at the invitation of Michael Fradji Memmi, bass player of the Frenchies (fr), which she joined as the singer. She returned to London in 1976 in the midst of the early punk movement. At one point she tried to convince Steve Jones and then Johnny Rotten (of the Sex Pistols, who were managed by McLaren), to marry her to get her a work permit. Hynde's version of this episode has it that Rotten "offered to go to a registry office with me and do the unmentionable," but when he subsequently withdrew, Sid Vicious volunteered to take his place. Upon arrival at the registry office the following morning, they found it "closed for an extended holiday" and were unable to attend the following day due to Vicious making a court appearance. In late 1976, Hynde responded to an advertisement in Melody Maker for band members and attended an audition for the band that would become 999. Jon Moss (who would later be in Culture Club) and Tony James of Generation X also auditioned. Later, Hynde tried to start a group with Mick Jones from the Clash.

After the lack of success with the band, Malcolm McLaren placed her as a guitarist in Masters of the Backside but she was asked to leave the group just as it became the Damned. After a brief spell in the band Johnny Moped, Mick Jones invited Hynde to join his band on their initial tour of Britain. Hynde recollected of that period,

It was great, but my heart was breaking. I wanted to be in a band so bad. And to go to all the gigs, to see it so close up, to be living in it and not to have a band was devastating to me. When I left, I said, "Thanks a lot for lettin' me come along," and I went back and went weeping on the Underground throughout London. All the people I knew in town, they were all in bands. And there I was, like the real loser, you know? Really the loser.

Hynde also spent a short time with punk band the Moors Murderers in 1978. Named after a pair of child-killers, the band consisted of future Visage front man Steve Strange on vocals, Vince Ely on drums, with Mark Ryan (a.k.a. the Kid), and Hynde on guitar. The band's name alone was enough to start controversy, and she soon distanced herself from the group. As noted in NME, Hynde said: "I'm not in the group, I only rehearsed with them." She stated: "Steve Strange and Soo Catwoman had the idea for the group, and asked me to help them out on guitar, which I did, even though I was getting my own group together and still am."

== The Pretenders ==
In 1978, Hynde made a demo tape and gave it to Dave Hill, owner of the Real Records label. Hill stepped in to manage her career, and began by paying off the back rent owed on her rehearsal room in Covent Garden, London. Hill also advised Hynde to take her time and get a band together. In the spring of 1978, Hynde met bass guitarist Pete Farndon and they selected a band consisting of James Honeyman-Scott (guitar, vocals, keyboards) and Martin Chambers (drums, vocals, percussion). The name "the Pretenders" was inspired by the Sam Cooke version of the Platters' 1955 R&B hit song "The Great Pretender."

They recorded a demo tape (including "Precious", "The Wait," and a Kinks cover, "Stop Your Sobbing"), handed it to Hynde's friend Nick Lowe, produced a single ("Stop Your Sobbing"/"The Wait"), and performed their first gig at a club in Paris. The single was released in January 1979 and hit no. 33 in the UK. A second single "Kid" followed to similar success in July 1979. In November 1979, the Pretenders released their first signature single "Brass in Pocket" in the UK, which hit UK number 1 on January 19, 1980, the same date as their eponymous first album. Both went on to similar chart success worldwide.

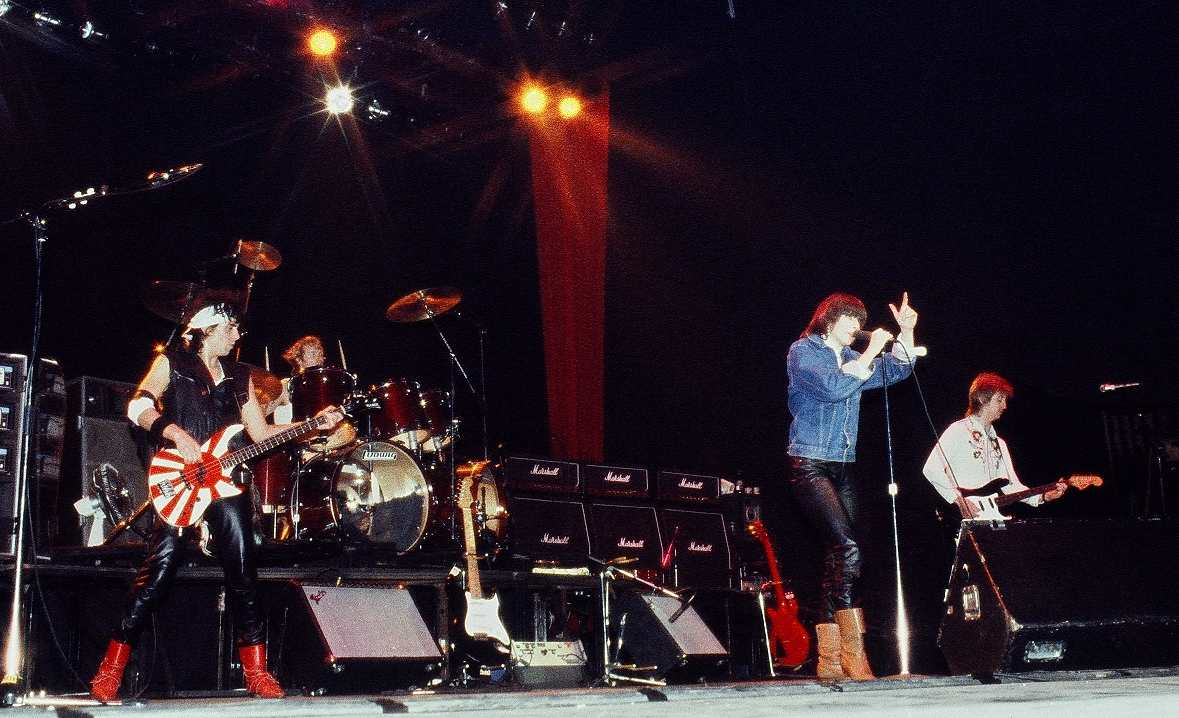
The Pretenders playing at London's Dominion Theatre in 1981

The band released an EP album, Extended Play, on March 30, 1981; they released Pretenders II later in the summer. "Talk of the Town" and "Message of Love" were on both. The Pretenders lineup changed repeatedly over the next decade. Honeyman-Scott died of a drug overdose on June 16, 1982, just days after Farndon had been fired from the band. Farndon also died of a drug overdose the following year. After re-forming with a caretaker lineup (Martin Chambers, Billy Bremner, Tony Butler, and Jeremy Allom) for their next single, "Back on the Chain Gang", the band settled down with Robbie McIntosh (guitar) and Malcolm Foster (bass) during the recording of their next album, the worldwide hit Learning to Crawl. Chambers left the band in the mid-1980s before the Get Close album was released in 1986. The album included the hits "Don't Get Me Wrong" and "My Baby." Amidst the ever-changing lineup, Hynde endured as the sole original Pretender until Chambers' return in the mid-1990s. Hynde was the only stable member of the band during this period. In 1994, the band had another hit, the ballad "I'll Stand by You."

Hynde continued with the Pretenders into the new century, both in new recording as well as multiple tours worldwide. New Pretenders albums emerged in 2002 (Loose Screw), 2008 (Break Up the Concrete,) and 2016 (Alone).

Hynde was inducted into the Rock and Roll Hall of Fame in 2005 as a member of the Pretenders. The ceremony was held at the Waldorf-Astoria Hotel in Manhattan, New York City.

In 2016, the band collaborated with Dan Auerbach of the Black Keys on the album Alone. This album was released as a Pretenders' album, though Hynde was the only original member to appear on it. The new band also played a concert for the BBC at the Maida Vale studio. In 2016, Hynde and the Pretenders opened for Stevie Nicks.

In July 2020, the Pretenders released their 11th studio album Hate for Sale. The album was well received critically and obtained a score of 78 on the critical aggregator Metacritic.

On March 9, 2022, Hynde performed a rendition of the Pretenders song "I'll Stand By You" at Night for Ukraine, a fundraising benefit held at the Roundhouse in north London. Funds raised were donated to the Disasters Emergency Committee appeal, to provide aid to people fleeing Ukraine following the Russian invasion. The event was organized by Fabien Riggall in collaboration with the Ukrainian pop duo Bloom Twins.

On June 24, 2023, Hynde and the band played the Glastonbury Festival with guest artist Johnny Marr. Dave Grohl also guested on drums for one song.

== Other musical projects ==
Hynde, along with Curved Air's Sonja Kristina, sang backing vocals on Mick Farren's 1978 album Vampires Stole My Lunch Money and also on Hurt by Chris Spedding. She also sang backing on a track, "Nite Klub", on the Specials' first album The Specials. Hynde sang a duet with INXS on their album Full Moon, Dirty Hearts in 1993. She appears on the title track of the album. Hynde sang the vocals on the track "State of Independence Part II" on a Moodswings album named Moodfood, which was played during the closing credits on the soundtrack of Single White Female. She provided backing vocals on Morrissey's single "My Love Life" in 1991 and again on the B-side "Shame Is the Name" in 2009.

Hynde recorded a duet with Frank Sinatra on his 1994 album Duets II. They performed the song "Luck Be a Lady." In 1995, Hynde made an acting appearance as fictional character Stephanie Schiffer on the US television comedy Friends. She was in the episode "The One with the Baby on the Bus", in which she performed "Angel of the Morning" and the comedy song "Smelly Cat" (which she co-wrote) with Lisa Kudrow as Phoebe Buffay on acoustic guitar. Also in 1995, Hynde sang a cover of "Love Can Build a Bridge" with Cher and Neneh Cherry. Eric Clapton appeared on the track, supplying the lead guitar solo that is featured in the song's instrumental bridge.

In 1997, the EMI publishing company issued a cease and desist request to Rush Limbaugh, who for years had been using an edited instrumental version of Hynde's song "My City Was Gone" for the broadcast's opening theme. When the request came to Hynde's attention during a radio interview, she said her parents loved and listened to Rush and she did not mind its use. They agreed to a royalty contract which she retained and at one time used for a payment to PETA to raise awareness of chemical testing on animals.

Hynde's most popular non-Pretenders collaboration with another artist, chartwise, was her 1985 work with UB40 on a cover of Sonny and Cher's "I Got You Babe." The track topped the UK singles chart and went as high as No. 28 on the Billboard Hot 100 in the U.S.

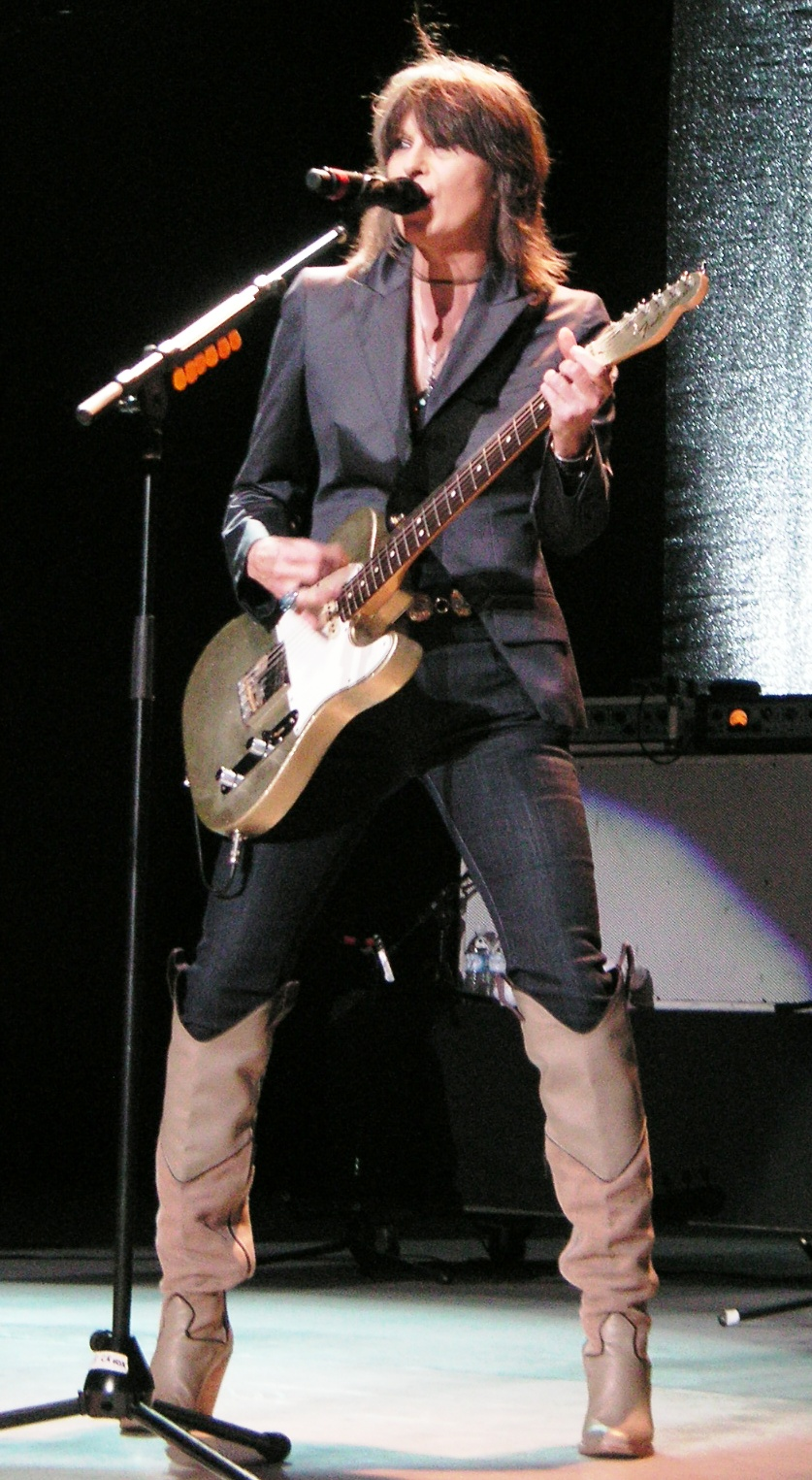
Hynde in 2007

On April 10, 1999, Hynde led the memorial concert "Here, There and Everywhere – A Concert for Linda" for her late close friend Linda McCartney at the Royal Albert Hall, London. Proceeds went to animal rights charities.

In 1999, Hynde played guitar and sang vocals with Sheryl Crow on the song "If It Makes You Happy" during a concert in Central Park. Hynde is mentioned prominently in the lyrics of the Terence Trent D'Arby song "Penelope Please." In 1998, Hynde sang a duet with her friend Emmylou Harris, "She", accompanied by the Pretenders on the Gram Parsons tribute album, Return of the Grievous Angel: A Tribute to Gram Parsons. Hynde had previously reviewed Gram and Emmylou's debut country rock classic, GP. The version merges Emmylou's country rock and Hynde's reggae-tinged new wave. Hynde also recorded a song called "Cry (If You Don't Mind)" with the Spanish band Jarabe de Palo for their album Un metro cuadrado – 1m². She supplied the voice for Siri, the clouded leopard in the movie Rugrats Go Wild (2003) in which she sang a duet with Bruce Willis.

In 2004, Hynde moved to São Paulo, Brazil, for a couple of months in order to play with Brazilian musician Moreno Veloso. She was also the vocalist on Tube & Berger's 2004 No. 1 Hot Dance Airplay track "Straight Ahead." The track gave Hynde a No. 1 track on the Billboard charts. Likewise in 2005, Hynde duetted with Ringo Starr on a song entitled "Don't Hang Up," which can be heard on Starr's album Choose Love. Also in 2005, she collaborated with Incubus on a song called "Neither Of Us Can See." The song is on the soundtrack album for Stealth.

On October 17, 2008, she was an opening act for fellow Akron-area musicians Devo at a special benefit concert at the Akron Civic Theater for then-presidential candidate Barack Obama. The Black Keys, another Akron-based band, and the then up-and-coming solo artist, Rachel Roberts, performed prior to her.

Hynde features as guest vocalist on Ray Davies' 2009 Christmas single "Postcard From London" and Morrissey's Years of Refusal the same year.

Hynde and Welsh singer J.P. Jones formed a band called "J.P., Chrissie and the Fairground Boys", releasing an album, Fidelity, on August 24, 2010. Several stops on the tour were recorded and sold on USB flash drives.

On February 5, 2011, Hynde and the Pretenders performed live on CMT Crossroads with Faith Hill and her band, including songs from both catalogs.

Along with John Cale and Nick Cave, Hynde played on BBC Four for the Songwriter's Circle program on July 9, 1999. The concert took place at the Subterania Club in London, England and was released on DVD. She also later joined Cave in 2010 for a rendition of Screamin' Jay Hawkins' song "I Put a Spell on You" as a benefit for the Haiti disasters. The song and music video featured performances by Mick Jones, Glen Matlock, Shane MacGowan, and Bobby Gillespie among others.

Hynde released a new album, Stockholm, on June 10, 2014. The album featured contributions from Neil Young and John McEnroe.

Hynde released Valve Bone Woe, a jazz/pop album of selected covers with the Valve Bone Woe ensemble on September 6, 2019, produced by Marius de Vries. The album debuted at no. 32 on the Official UK album charts and at no. 1 on the UK Jazz and Blues chart.

Hynde and James Walbourne were inspired by the surprise release of Bob Dylan's songs "Murder Most Foul" and "I Contain Multitudes" during the early part of the COVID-19 pandemic to record nine of her favorite Dylan compositions, released initially via YouTube and subsequently on the 2021 album Standing in the Doorway: Chrissie Hynde Sings Bob Dylan.

A 2023 conversation with Jörn Weisbrodt led Hynde to duet with Weisbrodt's husband Rufus Wainwright on "Always on My Mind", which became part of her 2025 Duets Special album which also features Brandon Flowers, Dave Gahan and Debbie Harry.

== Artistry and influence ==
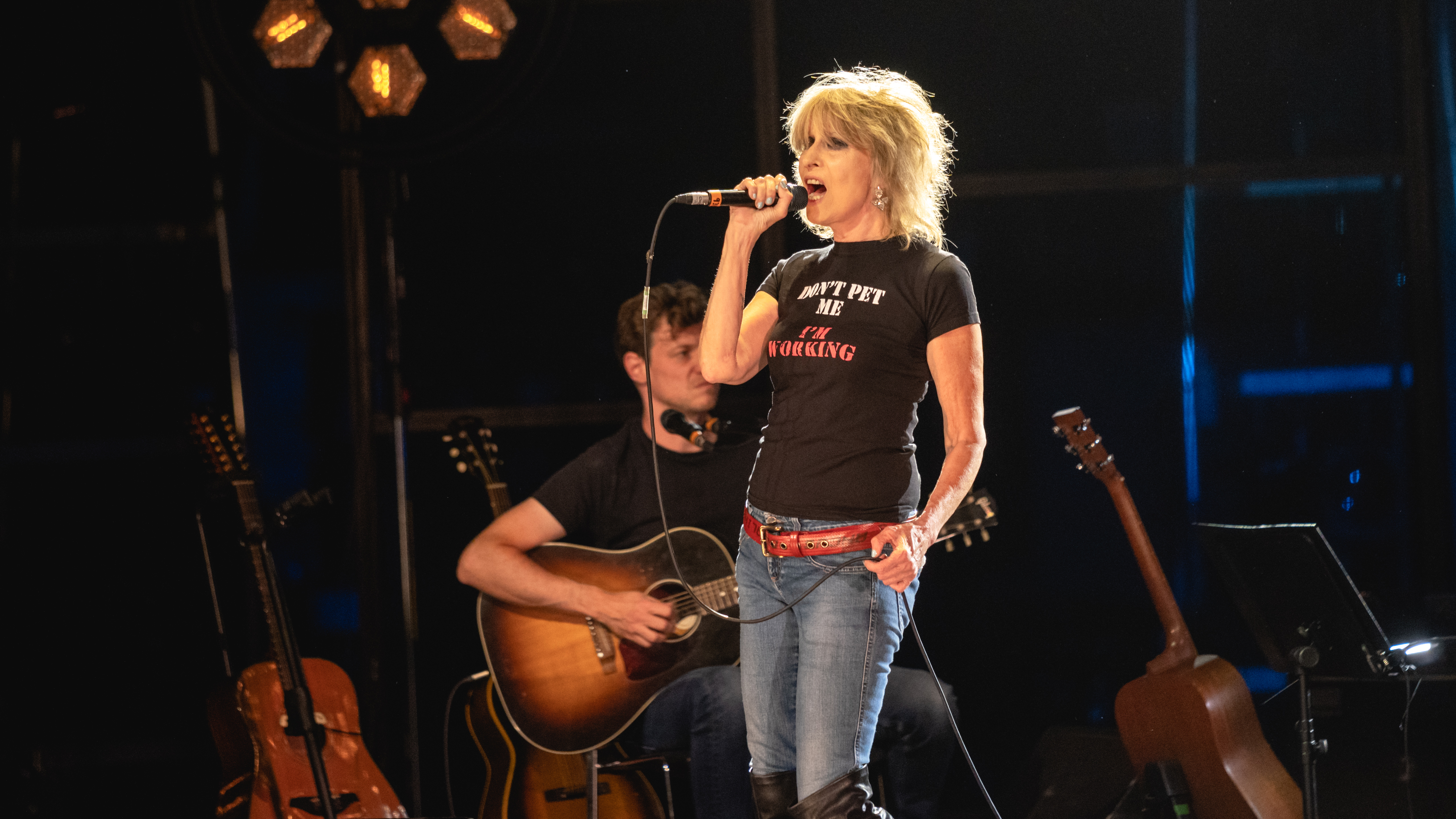
Chrissie Hynde performing in 2021 at the Royal Opera House

Hynde has a contralto vocal range. Until 1978, shortly before the advent of the Pretenders, Hynde had little idea what she sounded like. Hynde eschews formal voice training; she contends that "distinctive voices in rock are trained through years of many things: frustration, fear, loneliness, anger, insecurity, arrogance, narcissism, or just sheer perseverance – anything but a teacher."

In a 1994 interview, Madonna recalled of Hynde:

"I saw her play in Central Park [in August 1980, performing with the Pretenders]. She was amazing: the only woman I'd seen in performance where I thought, yeah, she's got balls, she's awesome! ... It gave me courage, inspiration, to see a woman with that kind of confidence in a man's world."

== Personal life ==
Hynde, born in the United States, has long maintained dual citizenship with the UK. In the 1970s, she went back to the US briefly before returning to the UK.

In 1980, Hynde met Ray Davies (of the Kinks, of whom Hynde had been a fan) in a New York nightclub and the two began a relationship. In 1979, the Pretenders' first single had been a cover of the Kinks' "Stop Your Sobbing", which Davies wrote. The Pretenders went on to cover another of Davies's songs, "I Go to Sleep", which became a UK Top 10 hit for them in 1981. In 1982, Hynde and Davies planned to marry in Guildford, but "the guy in the register office took one look at us and suggested we come back another time."; the couple never did marry. They had a daughter in 1983. After her relationship with Davies ended, Hynde married Jim Kerr, lead singer of the band Simple Minds, in 1984. They had a daughter in 1985. They lived in South Queensferry as well as Kilmacolm, Scotland and divorced in 1990; Hynde was married to Colombian artist and sculptor Lucho Brieva from 1997 to 2002.

Hynde follows Vaishnavism, a branch of Hinduism, and travels to India once every year to further her studies.

Hynde lives in London and has an apartment in the Northside Lofts in her hometown of Akron.

Hynde became a vegetarian in 1969 at the age of 18. She has described becoming a vegetarian as "the best thing that ever happened to me." She says that she came to regard meat-eaters with "distaste, almost contempt" but has learned to "live and associate with [them] but never respected them." Hynde is also an animal rights activist and a supporter of PETA and the animal rights group Viva!.

Hynde has publicly campaigned against the extradition of Julian Assange to the United States, and in February 2020 called on then US President Donald Trump to "set him free."

=== Autobiography ===
Hynde published an autobiography, Reckless: My Life as a Pretender, on September 8, 2015.

In October 2018, Hynde released a limited edition book of her artworks, titled Adding the Blue, the name being taken from the final track on her 2014 solo album, Stockholm.

=== Restaurant venture ===
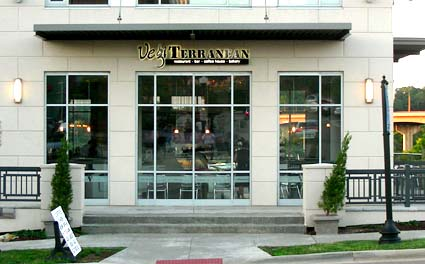
The VegiTerranean restaurant and bar and bakery at Northside Lofts, 21 Furnace St., Akron, Ohio

Hynde opened the VegiTerranean, a vegan restaurant, in the Northside Lofts, Akron, Ohio in November 2007. The restaurant served fusion Italian-Mediterranean food by head chef James Scot Jones. Before the restaurant's opening on September 15, 2007, Hynde performed three songs at the restaurant with Adam Seymour, a former lead guitarist of the Pretenders. The restaurant was voted among the top five vegan restaurants in the U.S. It closed on October 2, 2011, owing to the economic climate, according to Hynde.

== Discography ==
=== JP, Chrissie and the Fairground Boys ===
- Fidelity! (2010)

=== Solo albums ===
Title	Album details	Peak chart positions								
Title	Album details	US	BEL (Fl)	BEL (Wa)	GER	POR	SPA	SWE	SWI	UK
Stockholm	Released: June 10, 2014; Label: Caroline International	36	51	56	83	—	—	43	73	22
Valve Bone Woe	Released: September 6, 2019; Label: BMG	— (Note: Valve Bone Woe did not enter the Billboard 200, but it peaked at number 2 on Billboard's Jazz Albums chart.)	—	188	79	47	57	—	77	32
Standing in the Doorway: Chrissie Hynde Sings Bob Dylan	Released: May 21, 2021; Label: BMG	— (Note: Standing in the Doorway did not enter the Billboard 200, but it peaked at number 68 on Billboard's Top Album Sales chart.)	—	—	38	—	—	—	23	47
Duets Special	Released: October 17, 2025; Label: Parlophone	—	—	—	—	—	—	—	—	61
"—" denotes a recording that did not chart.

=== Singles ===
Title	Year	Peak chart positions										Album
Title	Year	US	AUS	AUT	BEL (Fl)	GER	NDL	NZ	SWE	SWI	UK	Album
"I Got You Babe" (with UB40)	1985	28	1	14	4	15	2	1	17	15	1	Baggariddim
"Breakfast in Bed" (with UB40)	1988	— (Note: "Breakfast in Bed" did not enter the Billboard Hot 100, but it peaked at number 4 on Billboard's Alternative Airplay chart.)	43	—	10	40	10	5	—	16	6	UB40
"Spiritual High (State of Independence)" (with Moodswings)	1992	—	—	—	—	—	—	—	—	—	47	Moodfood
"Love Can Build a Bridge" (with Cher, Neneh Cherry & Eric Clapton)	1995	—	—	18	—	62	41	—	—	21	1	Non-album single
"Kid 2000" (with Hybrid)	2000	—	—	—	—	—	—	—	—	—	32	Wider Angle
"Aria E Memoria (We'll Be Together)" (with Alessandro Safina)	2001	—	—	—	—	—	83	—	—	—	—	Insieme A Te
"Straight Ahead" (with Tube & Berger)	2004	— (Note: "Straight Ahead" did not enter the Billboard Hot 100, but it peaked at number 4 on Billboard's Dance Club Songs chart.)	—	—	—	—	63	—	—	—	29	Non-album single
"—" denotes a recording that did not chart.
