= If This Is What You Call Love (I Don't Want No Part of It) =

Single by the Persuaders

from the album Thin Line Between Love and Hate
- B-side: "Thanks for Loving Me"
- Released: March 1972
- Label: Win or Lose
- Songwriters: Richard Poindexter; Jackie Members; Stanley Poindexter
- Producer: The Poindexter Brothers

The Persuaders singles chronology
"Love Gonna Pack Up (And Walk Out)" (1971)	"If This Is What You Call Love (I Don't Want No Part of It)" (1972)	"Peace in the Valley of Love" (1972)

Music video
- "If This Is What You Call Love (I Don't Want No Part of It)" on YouTube

"If This Is What You Call Love (I Don't Want No Part of It)" was a 1972 single for the Persuaders. It became a chart hit for them that year, registering in multiple charts.

== Background ==
"If This Is What You Call Love (I Don't Want No Part of It)" was written by Robert Poindexter, Jackie Members and Stanley Poindexter. It was produced by the Poindexter Brothers for Win or Lose Productions. Backed with "Thanks for Loving Me", it was released on Win or Lose WL-222.

== Reception ==
Referred to as just "If This Is Love", the record was one of the Record World Single Picks for the week of 25 March 1972. The reviewer said that this track from the new Persuaders album was done in the distinctive style of the bunch who did "Thin Line Between Love and Hate", and the single could catch on. It was also reviewed in Cash Box for that same week. It was in the Choice Programming section of the magazine. The reviewer said that it had that distinctive vibes sound that made "Thin Line" such a giant.

== Charts ==
For the week of 8 April 1972, "If This Is What You Call Love (I Don't Want No Part of It)" debuted at no. 48 in the Cash Box R&B TOP 60 chart. It peaked at no. 19 on the Cash Box R&B Top 60 chart for the week of 6 May.

For the week of 15 April, "If This Is What You Call Love (I Don't Want No Part of It)" debuted at no. 33 in the Billboard Best Selling Soul Singles Chart. The single peaked at no. 27 for the week of 22 April and held that position for another week.

For the week of 22 April 1972, "If This Is What You Call Love (I Don't Want No Part of It)" debuted at no. 42 in the Record World R&B Singles chart. For the week of 27 May, the single was at no. 13 then dropped down to no. 16 the following week.
