= The Supreme Florence Ballard =

Compilation album by Florence Ballard
- Released: September 18, 2001
- Recorded: 1961 (tracks: 15, 17–18); 1965 (track 16); March–April, 1968 (tracks: 1–11); August, 1968 (tracks: 12–13)
- Studios: Motown, Detroit, Michigan; Broadway, New York City
- Genres: Pop; R&B; soul
- Length: 45:59
- Label: Spectrum Music
- Producers: George Kerr; Robert Bateman; Marc Gordon; Hal Davis; Berry Gordy

The Supreme Florence Ballard is a 2001 release by Universal Music Group's Spectrum Music. The release compiles the 1968 ABC Records solo recordings of Florence Ballard with four Motown tracks she recorded lead vocals for whilst in The Supremes. The ABC Records album, originally titled You Don't Have To, was shelved and bootlegged heavily preceding the compilation's release. Ballard's second ABC single, "Love Ain't Love", was covered by Udell Anderson in 1969 and by Madeline Bell in 1971. The track "My Heart" was covered and released as a single by Linda Jones in 1969, also produced by Kerr.

== Background ==
=== Leaving The Supremes ===
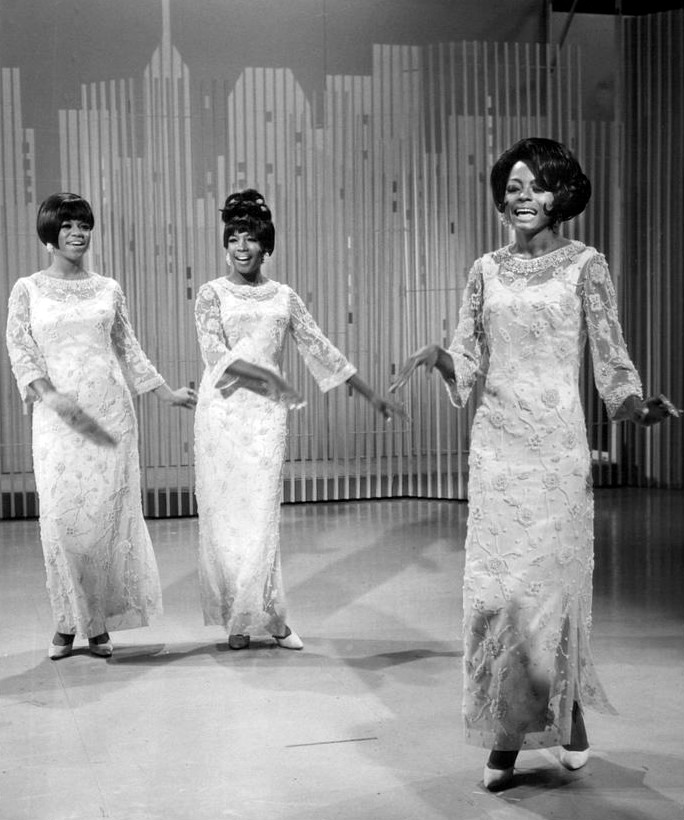
Ballard (left) in 1966, performing with The Supremes — Mary Wilson (center) and Diana Ross (right) — on The Ed Sullivan Show

Billboard reported in the issue dated 12 August 1967, that Ballard had withdrawn from The Supremes due to ill health according to a Motown spokesman. Cindy Birdsong, formerly of Patti LaBelle & The Bluebells was reported as her permanent replacement whilst Ballard was reported as being a patient at the Henry Ford Hospital. In February 1969, Ebony reported following Ballard's "rest" at Ford Hospital, she travelled to California before meeting Tommy Chapman for their wedding in Hawaii. The wedding was followed by Ballard 'working a few clubs', before she returned home on Buena Vista - opposite to former band member Diana Ross and doors away from Mary Wilson - to await the birth of her twins.

Ebony asked Ballard why she 'quit' The Supremes, to which she responded "Oh, I was just tired of traveling so much and wanted to settle down." Ebony also asked if Ballard was 'tired of making something like $1,000?', to which she said "Some things are more important than making money". Ebony noted her responses to the questions appeared rehearsed and had been repeated since summer 1967 'when she quit, or was asked to leave (neither which she nor The Supremes nor Motown Record Corp. will say which) one of the most successful acts in the history of entertainment.' Ebony explained, 'Nobody has been able to get beyond "that answer," and Motown has a flat "No comment" for anyone who tries to probe.'

In the book The Lost Supreme: The Life of Dreamgirl Florence Ballard, Peter Benjaminson quotes Ballard in an extensive 1975 interview, where she explains why she was no longer a member of The Supremes:

"At this particular incident at the Flamingo in Las Vegas, I had had me a few drinks...And they kept calling me fat so much until I went on stage and I poked my stomach out as far as I could [...] (Gordy) called me up the next morning and he said 'You're fired.' And I said 'I'm what?' And he said 'You're fired.' I said 'I'm not.' And he said, 'Well you're not going onstage tonight.' I said 'Yes, I am; who's going to stop me?' He said, 'I will. I'll have you thrown off if you go on.' So it went on and on and on. I told him 'I'm going onstage, and that's the end of that,' and hung up. And then his sister, Gwen Gordy called and said 'I guess you know that my brother can't make you leave the group, because you have a contract.' So it went on and on and on until I finally said to myself, 'Oh, well, what the hell, I'll be miserable as hell out here anyways as long as he's around, so I might just as well leave.' So I left. They had Cindy already there. I don't know how long she had been there, but they had had her there, and I flew on back to Detroit."

=== Settling with Motown ===
Following Ballard's exit from The Supremes, executives of ABC Records expressed interest in signing her but insisted they would not until she settled with Motown. On July 27, 1967, Ballard met with Motown vice-president Michael Roshkind, who offered her a release to sign which stipulated that Ballard could not use The Supremes name in any way despite her choosing the name for the group when they initially signed with the record label. Furthermore, the agreement prevented Ballard from receiving any future royalties from Motown, offering her $15,000 - paid in yearly installments of $2,500 for the next six years - for her rights to The Supremes name and any royalties accrued. Ballard said of this, "In other words, you're nothing". Ballard also recounted that Roshkind had told her "if you don't sign the paper, Berry Gordy won't have anything else to do with you", to which Ballard responded, "I told Michael Roshkind I really didn't give a damn whether Berry Gordy had anything to do with me or not...Then I started crying and I signed the paper. I didn't even finish reading it." Despite this initial offering, Ballard's final settlement was a one-time payment of $139,804, which was received by her attorney Leonard Baun. Ballard however, never received this and after numerous unsuccessful attempts between 1968–1969 to seek justice, Ballard contracted a law firm who filed suit in 1970 against Baun's law firm for "gross negligence, malpractice and breach of fiduciary duties and obligations".

=== ABC Records ===
In the issue dated 9 December 1967, Cashbox reported Ballard had signed with ABC Records, who immediately scheduled recording sessions, with plans to rush the release of her debut single, produced by George Kerr. Billboard also reported on 23 December 1967. Ballard later told Benjaminson that "The company released the record, but they just wouldn't push it." Benjaminson wrote, 'This is the kind of situation in which an experienced business manager was needed, and there is no question that one could have been found to take the post from Flo's husband', expressing that 'Tommy Chapman was out of his depth in this role' as 'any seasoned manager would have dealt swiftly with a record company that underpublicized Florence Ballard'. Andrew Hamilton of Allmusic commented, 'this is Ballards's first solo record. Jeers to ABC Records' sales and promotion departments for a poor effort, as it should have done better by name recognition alone.'

In 1969, Tommy Chapman, Ballard's husband and manager explained to Ebony, "we've tied in with Joe Glaser in New York. Mr Glaser's one of the biggest men in the booking business, see, so Flo's in for some real big things...college dates, tv, everything." Benjaminson quoted Katherine Anderson of The Marvelettes as saying though Tommy was "very nice", he "was always there when there was money to be made". In 1969, Ballard told Ebony that her singles for ABC - "It Doesn't Matter How I Say It (It's What I Say That Matters)" and "Love Ain't Love" - were "flops...just plain flops", but also that she was working on new material and had recorded parts of her first solo album, expressing:

"I didn't ever intend to get back into show business. I thought I'd make a few investments and just sort of stay home and take care of Tommy and the kids. But you know my fans get my telephone number somehow and they call me up and ask what I'm doing and why I don't sing again. So I decided to give it a try. If things don't work out I can always come back here and enjoy my house [...] I'm sort of like a—well, like Richard Nixon you might say. Remember how everybody thought he was all washed up? They thought he was out of it—through. But Nixon didn't think it; he believed in Richard Nixon. Now look where he is today. Same thing with me: I believe in Florence Ballard. I believe I can make it. Just because I'm not with The Supremes doesn't mean that I have to sit here in Detroit and dry up. I could have half a dozen flops and I'd still believe in me. I wonder if people know how many flops The Supremes had before we made it big?"

== Recording ==
=== Motown sessions ===
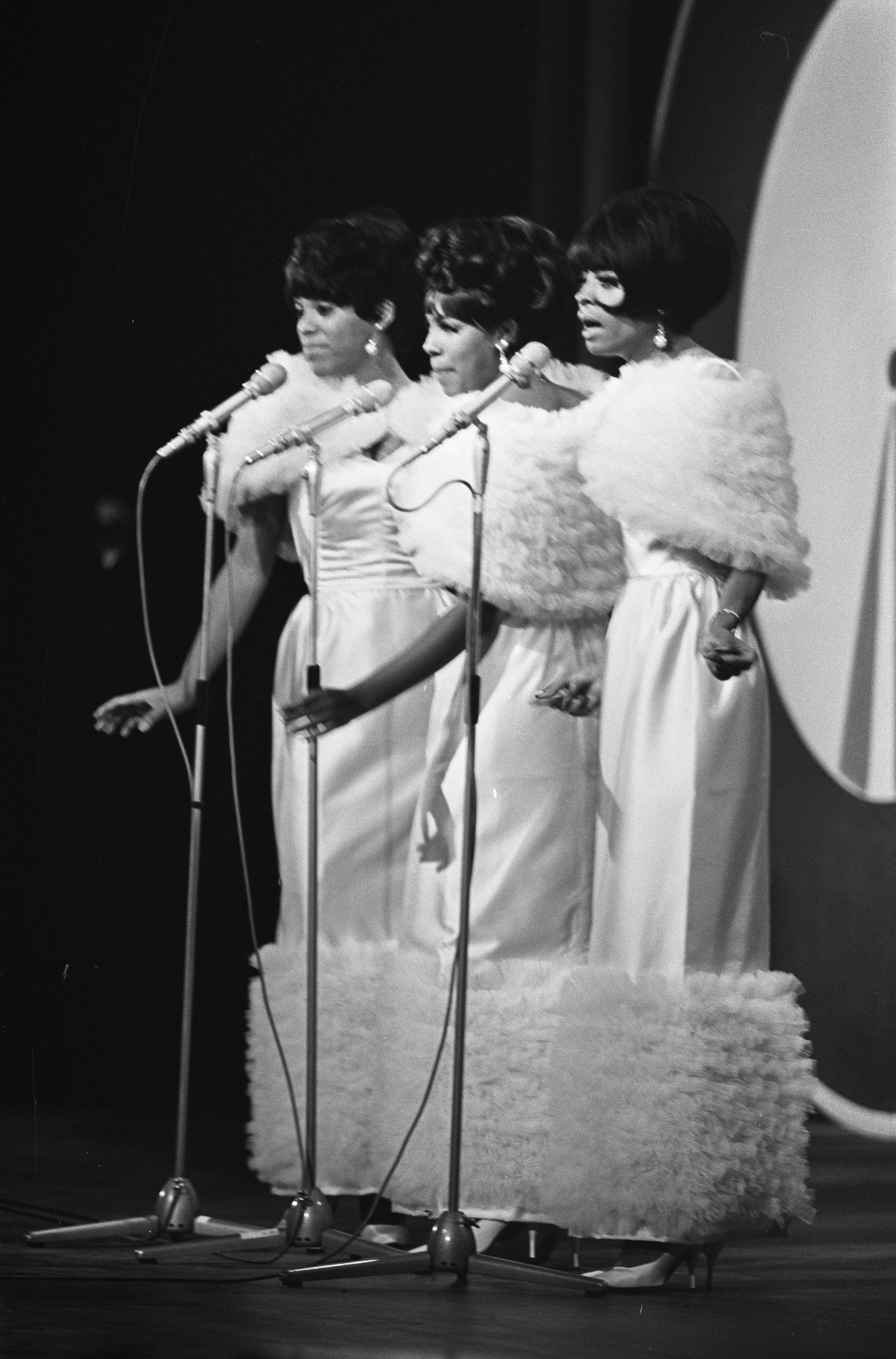
Ballard (left) on 2 October 1965, performing with The Supremes — Mary Wilson (center) and Diana Ross (right) — at the Grand Gala du Disque, in the Netherlands. We Remember Sam Cooke was released earlier in the year.

Produced by Berry Gordy; "Buttered Popcorn", "Hey Baby" and "Heavenly Father" were recorded in 1961 during the Motown sessions for Meet The Supremes (1962) when Ballard was only 18. Though "Buttered Popcorn" was the only Ballard-led song included on the original issue of the album, a 2010 expanded edition features earlier versions of "Buttered Popcorn" and "Hey Baby", plus a stereo mix of "Heavenly Father", which were previously unreleased. "Buttered Popcorn", described in the Motown Encyclopedia as 'a gritty, double entendre laden novelty item', was shortly released as a single before being withdrawn for a 'crisper' re-recorded master. It is the only single by The Supremes featuring lead vocals by Ballard.

"Ain't That Good News" is a cover recorded for The Supremes' tribute album, We Remember Sam Cooke (1965). Kevin Winkler for Huffington Post wrote, 'The album's biggest surprise is its last cut, “(Ain’t That) Good News,” featuring a lead vocal by Flo whose gospel fervor fairly jumps out of the headphones.' Winkler also noted, the recording is one 'that made Supremes fans grieve that Flo got so few opportunities to show off her powerful voice.'

=== ABC sessions ===
The ABC sessions were recorded at Broadway Studios, New York, mostly between March–April 1968 whilst Ballard was pregnant, with production by George Kerr, a former member of Little Anthony and the Imperials, who was briefly a songwriter and producer at Motown. A further session in August 1968 spawned the second single "Love Ain't Love" and b-side "Forever Faithful", both produced by Robert Bateman. Ballard expressed:

"It felt great to be recording again [...] it felt really great, I liked it a lot" and said ABC had hired "these three girls to do background: they were really good too, very good. And the music, they had gotten a band, session men, musicians who play for records [...] I liked the tunes, sure did, and my voice hadn't declined. The records sound great to me, and to a lot of people."

In The Supremes: A Saga of Motown Dreams, Success, and Betrayal, Mark Ribowsky describes lead single, "It Doesn't Matter How I Say It (It's What I Say That Matters)" as having a 'saucy Smokey Robinson-esque lyric' with 'layers of echo and strings, a funky bass line, and woo-ooo-ing backup singers'. Ribowsky writes that Kerr 'had Flo do her best Diana Ross imitation, all high and cute and breathy [...] Still it wasn't Ross, or the Funk Brothers; at best, it was a packet of Motown sweet and low set to a pre-disco dance beat, and it wasted her flair as an earthy R&B singer—something she demonstrated on the b-side, a torchy, emotive cover of the Imperials' "Goin' Out of My Head".' Andrew Hamilton of Allmusic also drew comparisons with "It Doesn't Matter How I Say It (It's What I Say That Matters)" and Ballard's earlier work, writing 'producer George Kerr attempts to duplicate the Supremes' sound on this 1968 Drake Holland song [...] Holland lyrics are a takeoff on Smokey Robinson's style, particularly the Miracles' main man lyrical scheme on "The Way You Do the Things You Do".'

Commenting on the other ABC recordings, Ribowsky wrote that the album was being completed with 'low-grade' songs, including 'weak' covers of "Yesterday", "It's Not Unusual" and "The Impossible Dream". Keith Hughes of Soul Source similarly writes, 'Their relationship doesn't seem to have worked out too well, although tapes for her unreleased album, 'You Don't Have To', contain a Kerr-Harris Jobete number, 'You Bring Out The Sweetness In Me'.

Robert Bateman, who produced the second single "Love Ain't Love" and b-side "Forever Faithful", was familiar with Ballard, having "discovered" The Primettes (who would later become The Supremes) at the Windsor Festival and attending their Motown audition. Van McCoy, who wrote "Love Ain't Love", would later compose the 1975 US number-one single "The Hustle", reported to be the biggest dance hit of the 1970s, with sales of 10 million copies. Ribowsky described "Love Ain't Love" as a 'string-coated dance mix' on which 'Bateman let Flo belt away with throaty, playful lustfulness' but called the b-side, "Forever Faithful", 'a better bet [...] with its HDH-style funk and sax solo.'

== Singles ==
- 1961: "Buttered Popcorn" b/w "Who's Loving You" (Tamla 54045)
- 1968: "It Doesn't Matter How I Say It (It's What I Say That Matters)" b/w "Goin' Out Of My Head" (ABC 11074)
- 1968: "Love Ain't Love" b/w "Forever Faithful" (ABC 11144)

== Promotion ==
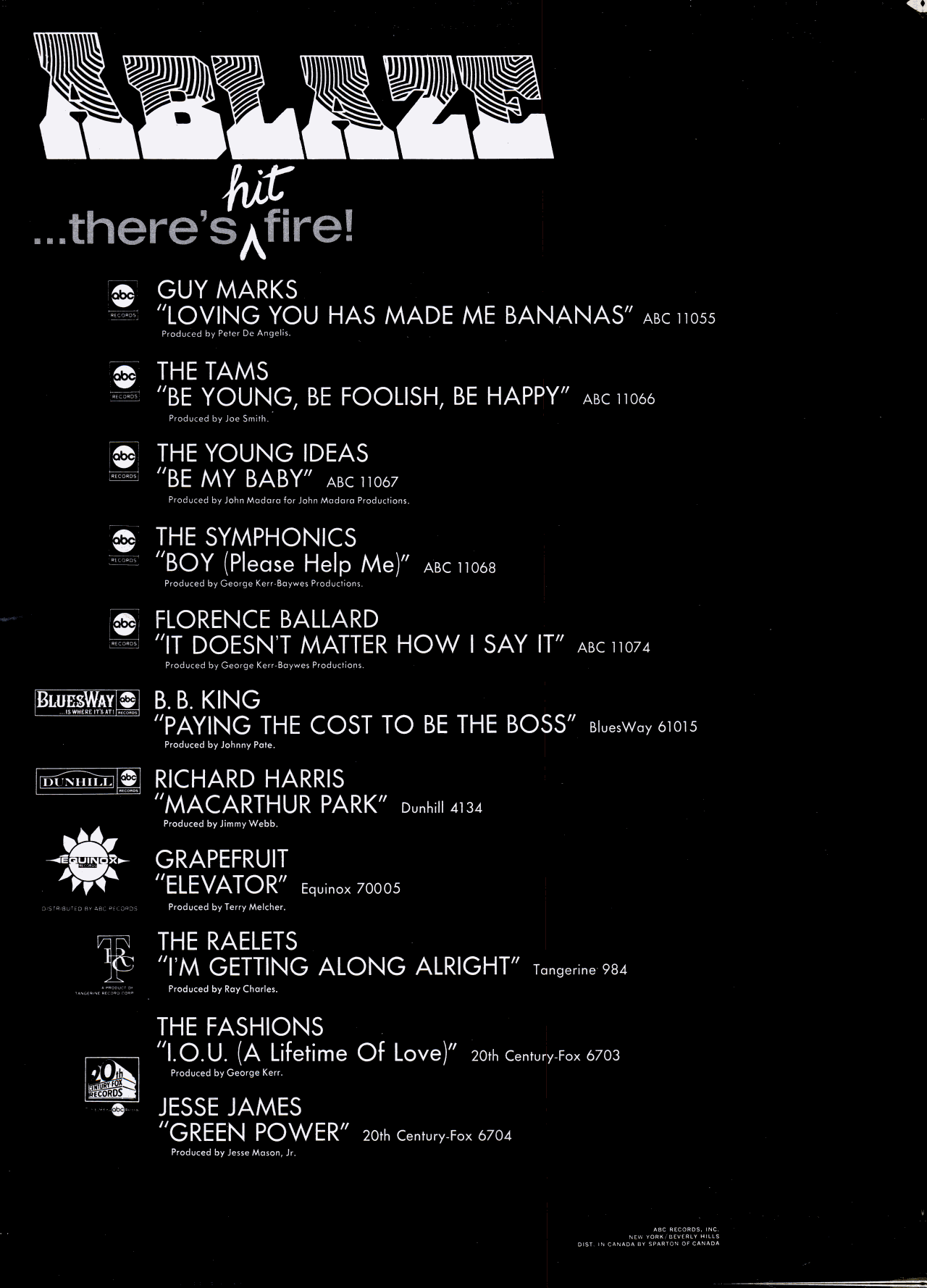
1968 ABC Records advertisement in Billboard, featuring "It Doesn't Matter How I Say It (It's What I Say That Matters)"

Ballard appeared on the Swingin' Time music variety show on June 13, 1968, for host Robin Seymour on CKLW-TV Channel 9. In September, 1968, Ballard joined Bill Cosby in a performance at the Ambassador Theatre, Chicago after receiving an enthusiastic public response when she rode in the annual Bud Billiken Parade in August, with husband Tommy Chapman and comedian Godfrey Cambridge. Following the release of "Love Ain't Love" in October, Ballard's husband and manager, Tommy Chapman, drove to radio stations and record stores with boxes of Ballard's records, leaving copies along the way, to little avail. ABC cancelled the album, You Don't Have To, and declined the option to renew Ballard's contract for a second year. Ballard was informed whilst having contractions, hours before the birth of her twin daughters, Michelle and Nicole.

On January 19, 1969, Ballard performed a show at Yorktown High School in Arlington County, Virginia, alongside Wilson Pickett. In the early 1960s, as one of The Primettes, Ballard had recorded backing vocals on the Pickett song "Let Me Be Your Boy". On January 20, 1969, Ballard performed at President Nixon's inauguration party.

== Release ==
In the compilation's liner notes, Randall Wilson, author of Forever Faithful: A Study of Florence Ballard and the Supremes, explains that several years prior to the 2001 Spectrum release, unauthorised tapes of Ballard's ABC recording sessions had been circulated, prompting an unsuccessful letter-writing campaign to MCA Records, requesting an official release. Randall Wilson also explained:

'The comments on the quality of the recordings varied from enthusiastic to underwhelmed. What was missing was perspective. Florence was young when the sessions took place. The type of material she was singing ranged from a spirited "Impossible Dream" and "Love Ain't Love", and a passable "Yesterday". These choices were at the start of her career, and not intended to be the lasting legacy of a founding member of The Supremes. The better ending of the story would have Florence going on to record many albums with songs culled from the classics of popular music. Imagine Florence doing the Dinah Washington songbook, or Gershwin's "Summertime". We'd all be looking back on that first album with the same attitude we have toward the Meet The Supremes album, knowing that The Supremes Sing Rodgers & Hart was yet to come — or when we hear Meet the Beatles! and marvel at its innocence compared to Sgt. Pepper. Could she have done it? I think so [...] This album, I feel has to be listened to with that perspective, and an understanding of the artist whose musical contribution extends far beyond these songs.'

== Reception ==
Professional ratings
Review scores
Source	Rating
Allmusic	4/5 stars

=== Singles ===
Stevie Chick of The Guardian, listed "Buttered Popcorn" as one of the best 10 Supremes songs. Chick expressed that Ballard was 'A bold, big-voiced belter' and described the song as 'A piece of raw, ribald soul lacking the polish that gilded their [The Supremes'] later hits'. Also, 'Ballard growls salaciously on Buttered Popcorn that her boyfriend “likes it greasy, and sticky, and salty, and gooey”, a knowingly saucy performance that somehow escaped the interference of Motown's infamous Quality Control department.' Similarly, Bonnie Stiernberg of Paste wrote 'the innuendo-laced track is not unlike buttered popcorn — salty, fluffy, and oh so good'. Contemporary reviews of "Buttered Popcorn" include a B+ from Cashbox, whilst music columnist Wayne Harada in The Honolulu Advertiser called the song 'A novelty' which 'merits attention'. "Buttered Popcorn" received much airplay in Detroit and neighbouring cities, but failed to chart — as did all of the group's singles until "Let Me Go the Right Way" charted in December 1962.

In the issue dated May 4, 1968, Cashbox called "It Doesn't Matter How I Say It (It's What I Say That Matters)", a 'firm step forward in the solo race by former Supreme Florence Ballard' with 'cute lyrical appeal'. On June 3, 1968, "It Doesn't Matter How I Say It (It's What I Say That Matters)" appeared at number 18 on WKLR 99.9 FM's chart. In the issue dated July 13, 1968, Cashbox published, 'Ex-Supreme Florence Ballard gets into her own bag on a fine double-sided effort. Slight nod to "It Doesn't Matter" for its freshness. Could be a big one.'

In the issue dated October 19, 1968, Cashbox listed "Love Ain't Love" in its Picks of the Week, writing, 'Though the lyrics have an often told love message, the manner in which they are presented should turn Florence Ballard into a new star on the solo scene. Former Supreme "Flo" has a brilliant time on this moving dance track with the power to break wide open on both pop and blues fronts. Expect national action.' Billboard, wrote in the issue dated 2 November 1968, 'Miss Ballard, formerly of The Supremes, makes a powerful bid for solo chart honors with a pulsating Van McCoy rhythm entry' and in the 16 November issue Ed Hochs wrote the song was 'makin' noise'.

=== Album ===
In a review of The Supreme Florence Ballard for Allmusic, Bruce Eder wrote 'Ballard's gritty, tough, yet still very alluring voice was seeking the right vehicle, on songs like "The Impossible Dream," "Yesterday," and "It's Not Unusual," and even crossing into the Supremes territory on the exciting and sensuous "It Doesn't Matter How I Say It" (which came out as a single at the time)'. Eder noted that when listening to "Stay in Love" or "Walk On By", 'one realizes a strange dichotomy—Ballard's voice isn't overtly "pretty" in the manner of Diana Ross, but she gets into a groove and she sings pretty; on "Goin' Out of My Head" and "You Bring Out the Sweetness in Me," a different split is evident, as she sings with a mix of raw power and terrible vulnerability.' Furthermore, 'The arrangements are (mostly) sympathetic to her abilities, and at least two-thirds of what is here was definitely releasable by any reasonable standard—that it was, instead, buried is yet another offense committed against this tragic figure.' Eder made further comments on the obscurity of the recordings and their release, writing, 'the very fact that this CD is a release of the Spectrum label—a European catalog item—shows how obscure the material is; if, say, ABKCO Records uncovered 13 completed solo songs by Brian Jones, you can bet they wouldn't be snuck out into the mid-priced European marketplace [...] why this material isn't in a U.S. catalog, and hasn't been written about more extensively—if only for a change of pace from the last (or inevitable next) Supremes hits compilation issued here—is anyone's guess.'

== Track listing ==
No.	Title	Writer(s)	Producer(s)	Length
1.	"Like You Babe"	Thomas, Harold, Thyandic	George Kerr	2:31
2.	"Yesterday"	Lennon–McCartney	George Kerr	2:43
3.	"Yours Until Tomorrow"	Gerry Goffin, Carole King	George Kerr	3:19
4.	"It's Not Unusual"	Gordon Mills, Les Reed	George Kerr	2:18
5.	"The Impossible Dream"	Mitch Leigh, Joe Darion	George Kerr	2:54
6.	"It Doesn't Matter How I Say It (It's What I Say That Matters)"	Drake Hollon	George Kerr	2:59
7.	"Stay In Love"	Unknown	George Kerr	3:03
8.	"Walk On By"	Burt Bacharach, Hal David	George Kerr	3:03
9.	"Goin' Out Of My Head"	Teddy Randazzo, Bobby Weinstein	George Kerr	2:52
10.	"You Bring Out The Sweetness In Me"	Gerald Harris, George Kerr	George Kerr	2:44
11.	"Everything Wonderful"	Drake Hollon	George Kerr	2:22
12.	"Love Ain't Love"	Van McCoy	Robert Bateman	2:37
13.	"Forever Faithful"	Robert Bateman, J. Wicker	Robert Bateman	2:52
14.	"My Heart"	Eddie Jones, Arthur Mitchell	George Kerr	3:04
15.	"Buttered Popcorn" (The Supremes — lead vocals: Florence Ballard)	Berry Gordy, Barney Ales	Berry Gordy	2:35
16.	"Ain't That Good News" (The Supremes — lead vocals: Florence Ballard)	Sam Cooke	Marc Gordon, Hal Davis	2:33
17.	"Hey Baby" (The Supremes — lead vocals: Florence Ballard)	Berry Gordy	Berry Gordy	2:20
18.	"Heavenly Father" (The Supremes — lead vocals: Florence Ballard)	Edna McGriff	Berry Gordy	2:50

== Personnel ==
Adapted from The Supreme Florence Ballard liner notes and Allmusic.

- Florence Ballard — vocals
- The Supremes — vocals
- Berry Gordy Jr. — producer
- Bert DeCoteaux — arranger
- George Kerr — producer
- Hal Davis — producer
- Marc Gordon — producer
- Richard Tee — arranger
- Robert Bateman — arranger, producer
