= Back on Top (O'Jays album) =

Studio album by the O'Jays
- Released: 1968
- Studio: Broadway Recording Studios, New York City
- Genre: R&B
- Length: 44:13
- Label: Bell
- Producer: George Kerr

The O'Jays chronology
Soul Sounds (1967)	Back on Top (1968)	The O'Jays in Philadelphia (1969)

Back on Top is the third album by the group the O'Jays released in 1968, featuring their biggest hit for the Bell label, "I'll Be Sweeter Tomorrow (Than I Was Today)". Their hit "Look Over Your Shoulder" was also included on this album. George Kerr produced the album with Pat Jaques engineering. Richard Tee was the conductor and arranger.

Original O'Jays members Eddie Levert, William Powell, Walter Williams and Bobby Massey all contributed to this album, and all four were pictured on its cover. This is the first O'Jays album not to include the group's fifth original member, Bill Isles, who quit the group shortly before this album was recorded. Bobby Massey would also later leave the group, just before their breakthrough success with Philadelphia International Records.

== Track listing ==
1. "I'll Be Sweeter Tomorrow (Than I Was Today)" (Emma Jean Thomas, Jackie Members, Robert Poindexter, Steve Poindexter)
2. "I'm So Glad I Found You" (George Kerr, Larry Roberts, Napoleon Kerr)
3. "Going, Going, Gone" (Jackie Members, Richard Poindexter, Robert Poindexter)
4. "That's Alright" (Jerry Baxter, Walter Williams)
5. "I Dig Your Act" (Johnny Tibbs, Richard Poindexter, Robert Poindexter)
6. "Look Over Your Shoulder" (George Kerr, Larry Roberts)
7. "You're Too Sweet" (Charles Harper, Richard Poindexter, Robert Poindexter)
8. "Just Another Guy" (George Kerr, Gerald Harris, Luke Gross)
9. "Four for the Price of One" (Jimmy Mundy, Larry Williams, Johnny Watson)
10. "Love Is Everywhere" (Charles Harper, Ray Lewis, Richard Poindexter, Robert Poindexter)
11. "Now That I've Found You" (Jerry Baxter, Walter Williams)
12. "I'll Be Seeing You" (Irving Kahal, Sammy Fain)
13. "The Choice"
14. "I Miss You"

Liner note author: Mark Marymont

== Singles ==
Single	Chart
"I'll Be Sweeter Tomorrow (Than I Was Today)"	66
"Look Over Your Shoulder"	89
"The Choice"	94
"I Miss You"	-
