= Helen Bruner and Terry Jones =

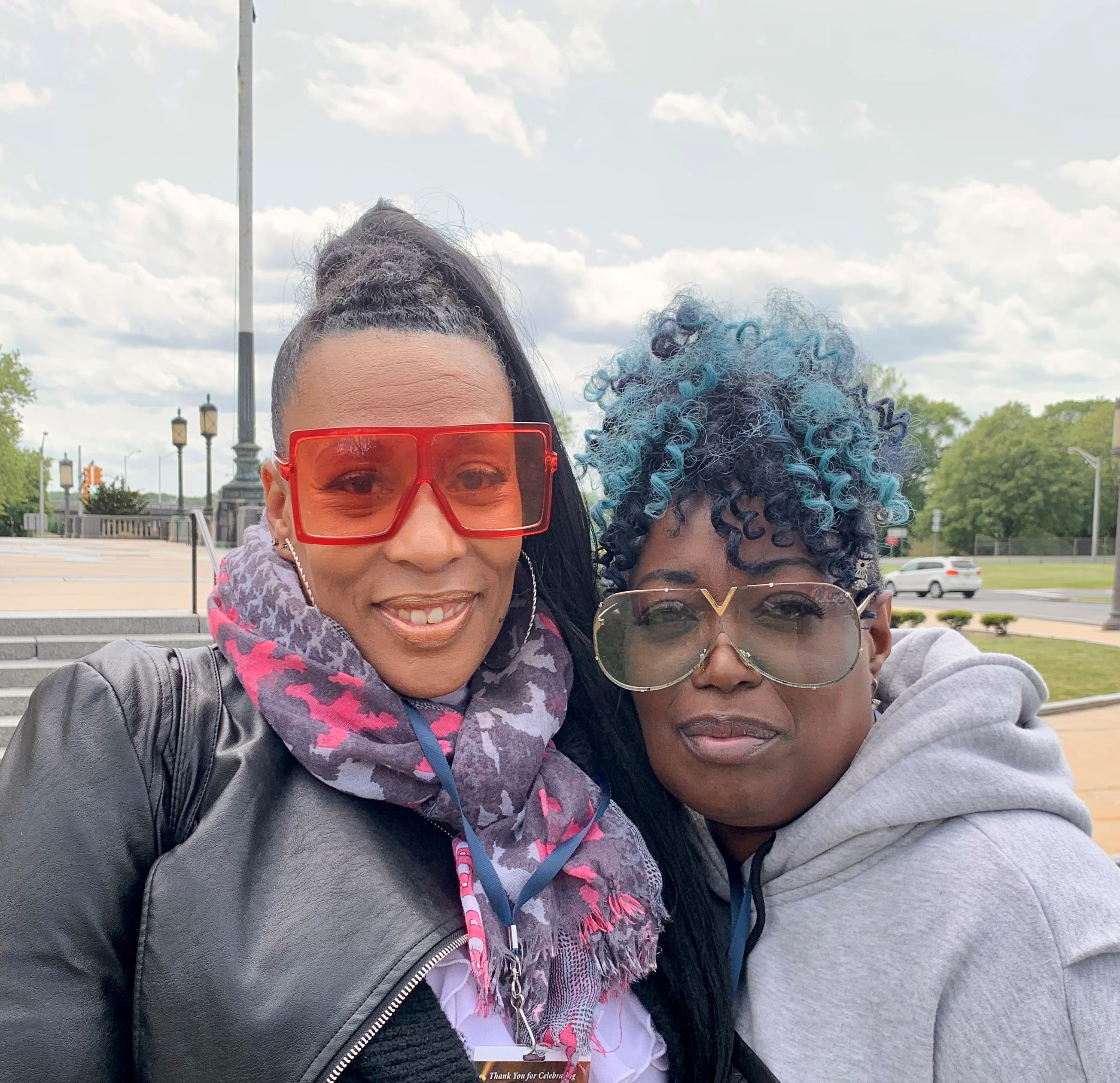
- Terry and Helen at Street Naming for Sarah Dash, May 18,2023.

Background information
- Also known as: Helen Bruner & Terry Jones
- Origin: Philadelphia, Pennsylvania
- Genres: Soul, R&B, Dance
- Occupations: Songwriters, Record Producers, Recording Artists
- Instruments: Vocals, Piano, Drums
- Years active: 1990 - present
- Labels: Philerzy, Island Records, The Hit Factory, Dream Beat

Helen Bruner and Terry Jones are an American Grammy nominated duo, songwriter and production team out of Philadelphia, Pennsylvania. They have worked with various artists as featured vocalist, songwriters and/or producers. They were nominated for a Grammy in 2008 along with soul singer Linda Jones for their single entitled, "Baby I know" for Best Traditional R&B Performance. Terry Jones is the daughter of the late Linda Jones.

Both, Bruner and Jones served as Board Trustees for The Recording Academy. In 2025, Jones was re-elected to a two-year term.

== Discography ==
=== Albums ===
- "Superstar" (2006) - Dream Beat - Artists, Producers, Songwriters
- "Hollyhood" (2010) - Philerzy - Artists, Producers, Songwriters
- "2nd Overture" (2023) - Philerzy - Artists, Producers, Songwriters

=== Singles ===
By Helen Bruner

- "Over You" (1990) by, Taken Featuring Helen Bruner - Island Records UK - Songwriter H. Bruner
- "Gimme Real Love" (1991) - Cardiac/Virgin US - Billboard Dance No.19
- "Missing You" (1992) - Cardiac/Virgin US - Songwriter H. Bruner & E. Hughes - Billboard R&B No.72

By Helen Bruner & Terry Jones

- "Over and Over" (1994) - Polydor Germany - F/M Featuring H. Bruner & T. Jones
- "I Aint Got Time" (1996) - Sub-Urban US - Next Phase Featuring H. Bruner & T. Jones - Billboard Dance No.20

=== Projects ===
- "Now" (2000) by, Cara Jones - Background vocals
- "Caught Up (2002) by, DJ Disciple Feat. Mia Cox - Songwriters H. Bruner, T. Jones & David Banks - Billboard Dance No.1
- "Soul Talkin" (2008) by, Linda Jones album - Philerzy - Featured Artists, Producers & Composers
