= The Poindexter Brothers =

American songwriting and production team

- Origin: United States
- Genres: R&B; soul
- Occupations: Musicians; record producers; composers
- Years active: 1960s–1970s
- Labels: Tuff; Verve; Win or Lose; Soul Junction
- Past members: Richard Poindexter; Robert Poindexter

The Poindexter Brothers were a recording act as well as music producers. As a recording act, they recorded the singles, "(Git Your) Backfield in Motion" and "What I Did in the Streets (I Should've Done at Home)". Together or individually, they produced hits for artists that include The Persuaders, Pat Johnson, etc. They wrote hits for artists such as Linda Jones, The O'Jays, Timothy Wilson and The Escorts etc. Other acts who have recorded their compositions include Brother to Brother, The Hesitations, The Icemen, and Johnny Thunder & Ruby Winters. They also formed their own production company and record label Win or Lose.

== Background ==
The Poindexter Brothers, Robert and Richard were born in Newport News, Virginia to parents, Garland and Marie. Garland Poindexter was in the military service and stationed at Langley Air Force Base. Marie was a maid.

Robert Poindexter (born circa 1942) came to New York when he was aged 21. He fell in love with the city.

The Poindexter Brothers were there from beginning of the formation of The Persuaders. The Persuaders were formed out of a group called the Internationals. Richard and Robert Poindexter had a small record label and got the Internationals to record for them. The two singles that were recorded by the group and produced by the brothers were of "raw" quality. They didn't get anywhere. The Internationals then ceased. Some months later the brothers set up a deal with Atlantic Records to have their Win Lose or Draw Productions released through them. The brothers then persuaded a reformed Internationals to change their name. The group now called The Persuaders recorded "Thin Line Between Love and Hate" which became a big hit for them in 1971.

The brothers' record label, Win or Lose was formed in 1971. It was headed by Le Charles Harper with Richard Poindexter as the president and Bobby Poindexter as the vice-president and A&R chief. Other key figures in the organization in various roles were, Monroe Thomas, Ray Lewis, Jerry E. Hankins.

Jackie Members was an aspiring singer who had lived next door to Jimi Hendrix at some point. She came to Chicago at the age of 16 in 1966. She had auditioned for Alonzo Tucker. Tucker, who wrote songs for Jackie Wilson, wanted her to go to New York to record. Tucker and Wilson asked Richard and Robert Poindexter if they could train her. She ended up marrying her mentor, Robert Pointdexter.

Singer Pat Johnson, who recorded "Love Brought You Here" is a cousin of the Poindexter Brothers.

== History and career ==
=== Recording artists ===
The Poindexter Brothers recorded the song "(Git Your) Backfield in Motion". Backed with "(Grandma) Give that Girl Some Slack", it was released on Verve VS 550 in 1966. According to the 17 December issue of Billboard, the song was a Chart Spotlight, one of the singles predicted to reach the R&B chart.

They recorded the song "What I Did in the Streets (I Should've Done at Home)". The credited composers were, J. Members, P. Dowdy, R. Poindexter and B. Poindexter. Backed with "Never Let Me Go", a Livingston, Evans composition, it was released on Win or Lose WOL 1.

=== Composers, producers ===
==== 1960s ====
The Icemen were a New York duo who had been around since the mid 1960s. They were singers Gino Armstrong and James Stokes. The Poindexter brothers wrote the song "(My Girl) She's a Fox" which was recorded by The Icemen and released in 1966. The song was arranged by Lonnie Youngblood and featured Gino Armstrong and James Stokes on vocals, Jimi Hendrix on guitar, and allegedly Richard Poindexter on piano. The song was backed with "I Wonder What It Takes" and was released on the Shamar label. It was mentioned in Kal Rudman's "R&B Beat Where it's At" column of Record World 4 June 1966 that Johnny Bantley keeps pushing "She's a Fox". The single didn't attract much attention. According to John McDermott's book, Ultimate Hendrix: An Illustrated Encyclopedia of Live Concerts and Sessions, the recordings made for Brantley (Johnny Brantley) that feature Hendrix, "(My Girl) She's a Fox" was possibly the strongest of his pre-Experience career. Other Icemen songs that had Poindexter involvement were, "(You’ve Got A) Style of Your Own" which was written by Robert Poindexter and LeCharles Harper, released on Vest 8008 in 1966. It was backed with "Let That Song Play", written by Robert Poindexter. And the A side of the single, "It's Gonna Take A Lot (To Bring Me Back Baby" bw "It's Time You Knew" issued on the OLE label was written by Richard Poindexter and Daisy Holland. Some years later, it was covered by The Manhattans.

The brothers wrote a song called "Hypnotized". They went to George Kerr with a girlfriend to perform the song. Kerr was impressed with the song but not the girl. (It's likely that the girl who recorded the first version was Jackie Members) Kerr went to friend of his called Jerry Harris and told him he required a girl singer. Kerr said he had the ideal singer for the song. Linda Jones was the singer in question. Three days later they were at New York's A-1 Studios. Jones did a run-through of the song and was unaware that Kerr had already asked engineer Herb Abramson to turn the recording switch on. When Jones had finished, she said to Kerr that she was ready. However, she wanted to re-do it because she had mispronounced the song title, but Kerr was happy with it. Kerr did the rounds with the song before Loma Records bought it. It was selling 15,000 copies a week then peaked at no. 4 in the R&B charts on 5 August 1967 and held that position for another two weeks.

Also in 1967, a song "(You'd Better) Straighten Up and Fly Right" which was composed by Patricia Johnson, Richard Poindexter, Emma Thomas and Jacqueline Members was recorded by Terri Bryant with George Kerr as the producer. Backed with "Everything's Wonderful", it was released on Verve VK 10553 in the second half of 1967. It was a "Best Bet" in the 7 October 1967 issue of Cash Box. Calling the song a "spirited, thumping, mid-tempo knee slapper", the reviewer also said that Bryant could earn a sizable about of coin with it. And for the same week, Billboard had it as "Chart Spotlight", a single predicted to reach the Hot 100 chart.

With Ray Lewis, the brothers wrote "Baby Baby Please" for Timothy Wilson. It was released on the Buddah label in October 1967. At the end of the year, the song got to no 46 on the Billboard Top Selling R&B Singles chart.

With C. Harper, they co-wrote "Give My Love a Try" for Linda Jones. The arrangements were handled by Richard Tee. Backed with "I Can't Stand It", it was released on the Loma Label in December 1967. One of the Picks of the Week, it was reviewed in the 9 December issue of Cash Box, and the prediction was that it would see a lot of action in the R&B charts and have a good run in the pop charts. It entered the Billboard Best Selling R&B Singles chart at no. 36 for the week of 20 January 1968. The following week it peaked at no. 34. It also got to no. 93 in the Billboard Hot 100.

Richard and Robert, together with Ray Lewis composed the song, "Love is Everywhere" which was backed with "Born Free", and released on the Kapp label. It was backed with "Born Free", and released on KAPP K-878. It was "Born Free" that became the hit, peaking at no. 4 on the Billboard Best Selling R&B Songs chart for the week of 24 February. It would hold that position for another week.

Ray Lewis sang on the song "Sitting at Home with My Baby (Tight'n Our Love Up)". He co-wrote it with another writer, possibly Rogelio Straughn. It was backed with "Too Sweet to Be Lonely" which was written by Harper, Poindexter, Poindexter, and released on the D'Ar Recording Co., Inc. label in 1969.

With Le Charles Harper, Robert Poindexter co-wrote the song, "So Nice, I Had to Kiss You Twice" which was the B side to Vivian Copeland's single, "He Knows My Key (Is Always in the Mailbox)" that was released on the D'Oro label in 1969.

==== 1970s ====
The brothers wrote and produced the song "Thin Line Between Love and Hate" for The Persuaders, it got to no. 1 on the R&B chart. It was recorded years later by The Pretenders and then H-Town and it became a title song for a movie. It was reported by Cash Box in the 4 December issue that Henry Allen, Atlantic Records' vice-president of promotion had finalized an agreement for distribution of Win or Lose Records releases. The Persuaders' release, "Love Gonna Pack Up (And Walk Out)" was the release for the new label. At the time, there were already fifteen artists on the Win or Lose roster.

"Love Gonna Pack Up (And Walk Out)", which they wrote for The Persuaders and also produced brought them more success in 1971. It was also released on their Win or Lose label.

The Poindexter brothers and Jackie Members composed "Love Brought You Here" which was recorded by Pat Johnson. Backed with "East of the Sun, West of the Moon", it was released on Win or Lose WL-221. Accompanied by Atlantic's Barbara Harris, Johnson went on a promotional tour that included visits to Baltimore, Richmond Virginia, Atlanta, Cleveland, Chicago and Detroit. The single was reviewed in the "Choice Programming" section of the 22 January 1972 issue of Cash Box. The reviewer said that it was a soul winner with definite pop possibilities. The song was described in the 12 February 1972 issue of RPM Weekly as its title having an irresistible hook. It entered the Cash Box Looking Ahead chart at no. 121 for the week of 11 March. It peaked at no. 116 the following week.

The song "Bad, Bold and Beautiful, Girl" was composed by the Poindexters, Alton Watkins, Jackie Members, Nelson Daniels and Robert Holloman. It was recorded by The Persuaders. It made it to no. 105 and no. 24 on the Billboard Charts in 1973.

The brothers wrote "I'll Be Sweeter Tomorrow" which was recorded by The Escorts. It was released on the Alithia label and on 16 February 1974, it got to no. 83 in the Billboard Hot Soul Singles chart.

The brothers worked with Chuck Stephens, who was a leading disk jockey on the New York radio station WWRL AM. He wanted to try his hand as a singer. He had already recorded two singles, one of them a composition by them. In 1977, he recorded their song, "Paying for Your Love" which was backed with "Coffee", and released on the Leo Mini label. It later became an in-demand Northern Soul track.

The Poindexter Brothers with Jackie Members wrote "Boogie City" which was recorded by The Reflections and released on the RCA label. Reviewed in the Cash Box Singles to Watch section for the week of 13 January 1979, the reviewer noted the gritty vocals and the fast action and said that it would interest uptempo R&B lists. The following week, Cash Box had it as a Must Spin in their Programmers Picks section. It was getting some attention in the UK, where it was in the Bubbling Under the Top 90 (Imports) chart for the week of 27 January. It was still bubbling under for the week of 19 February.

=== Later years ===
In 2020, their song "What I Did in the Streets (I Should've Done at Home)" was released as the B-side of Vivian Copeland's "Chaos (In My Heart)" on Soul Junction SJ1016.
