= Love Gonna Pack Up (And Walk Out) =

Single by the Persuaders

from the album Thin Line Between Love and Hate
- B-side: "You Must Have Put Something in Your Love"
- Released: December 1971
- Studio: Atlantic
- Length: 3:20
- Label: Win or Lose
- Songwriters: Poindexter; Poindexter; Members; Lewis
- Producer: The Poindexter Brothers

The Persuaders US singles chronology
"Thin Line Between Love and Hate" (1971)	"Love Gonna Pack Up (And Walk Out)" (1971)	"If This Is What You Call Love (I Don't Want No Part of It)" (1972)

"Love Gonna Pack Up (And Walk Out)" was a 1971 single for US R&B group, the Persuaders. It became a hit for them that year, registering in multiple charts.

== Background ==
"Love Gonna Pack Up (And Walk Out)" was recorded by the Persuaders. It was the follow up to their million-seller, "Thin Line Between Love and Hate". The record was produced by the Poindexter Brothers for Win or Lose Productions. The arranger was Richard Poindexter. The credited composers were, Poindexter, Poindexter, Members, and Lewis. It was recorded at Atlantic Studios and released in the United States on Win or Lose WL-220, and distributed there by Atlantic Recording Corporation. It was released in Canada on Atco WL-220. It was manufactured and distributed by Kinney Music Of Canada, Ltd.

== Reception ==
In the 4 December 1971 issue of Record World, the reviewer said that the song was different to the Persuader's big breakthrough, "Thin Line Between Love and Hate", and that it was good stuff. It was also one of the Picks of the Week in Cash Box that same week. The reviewer called the song Latin-infected soul and that it should go to the top. It was also included in the R&B section of the Cash Box Jukebox Programming Guide. Also that week, Billboard had the single as a Top 60 Pop Spotlight, meaning it was one of the singles predicted to reach the top 60 of the Hot 100 chart. Referring to the single as a "funky beat swinger with potent lyric line", the reviewer said that it had the same sales potential as their previous charting single. It was also predicted to reach the Top 20 of the Billboard Soul chart.

== Charts ==
For the week of 11 December 1971, "Love Gonna Pack Up (And Walk Out)" debuted at no. 109 in the Record World 101–150 Singles chart, and at no. 43 in the Record World R&B Singles chart. It also debuted at no. 86 in the Cash Box Top 100 Singles chart that week.

For the week of 1 January 1972, the single peaked at no. 14 in the Record World, R&B Singles chart. It held that position for another week.

At week ten, on 12 February 1972, it peaked at no. 54 in the Cash Box Top 100 Singles chart.

It peaked at No. 64 on the Billboard main chart and no. 8 on the Billboard R&B chart.
