= Different Skies =

Studio album by Cara Jones
- Released: 1994
- Recorded: 1994
- Genre: Singer-songwriter
- Length: 56:22
- Label: Fall Girl Records (originally released by Samson Records)
- Producer: Takuya Sugisawa

Cara Jones chronology
Different Skies (1994)	Pandora's Box (1996)

Professional ratings
Review scores
Source	Rating
Musical Discoveries	(not rated) link

Different Skies is the 1994 debut album by singer and songwriter Cara Jones who, up until its release, had operated solely as a songwriter for other artists. The album established Jones as an artist in her own right, selling unusual amounts for an indy release and making her the darling of Tokyo radio.

== Track listing ==
All songs by Jones, except where otherwise noted.

1. "Far Away" – 4:39
2. "New Life" – 7:13
3. "Those Were The Days" – 4:15 – Gene Raskin
4. "Different Skies" – 4:34
5. "I Thought I Was Over You" – 5:14
6. "Connecticut" – 3:46
7. "Far Away (elbow mix)" – 4:41
8. "Trust" – 3:24
9. "Those Were The Days (meow mix) – 4:17 – Gene Raskin
10. "Lover's Lies" – 5:06
11. "Far Away (alive 'n kicking mix)" – 4:41
12. "New Life (beatless)" – 4:32

The opening track, "Far Away", broke the top 40 in Tokyo and, despite its virtual lack of promotion, the album went on to sell 15000 copies in its few months on the shelves, before the independent label that had released it moved on to other projects.

== Personnel ==
- Jiro Takada – Electric guitar
- Ataru Sumiyoshi – Electric bass
- Eiji Otogawa – Soprano Saxophone
- Osamu Aoki – Acoustic guitar
- Masaaki Mizuno – Acoustic bass
- Shoko Tomikawa – Percussion
- Shigeo Miyata – Drums
- Takuya Sugisawa – Programming
- Nobuhiro Makino – Keyboards and piano
- Cara Jones, Aki Kudo, Jeff Manning – Backing vocals
