= Love Ain't Love =

Single by Florence Ballard

from the album The Supreme Florence Ballard
- B-side: "Forever Faithful"
- Released: September 1968
- Recorded: 1968
- Genre: Soul
- Length: 2:50
- Label: ABC Records
- Songwriter(s): Van McCoy
- Producer(s): Robert Bateman

Florence Ballard singles chronology
"It Doesn't Matter How I Say It (It's What I Say That Matters)" (1968)	"Love Ain't Love" (1968)

"Love Ain't Love" is the second solo single released by singer Florence Ballard, shortly after her departure from The Supremes. Robert Bateman, who produced both sides of the single, was familiar with Ballard, having "discovered" The Primettes (who would later become The Supremes) at the Windsor Festival and attended their Motown audition.

== Background ==
In 1967, Florence Ballard was fired by Motown Records founder Berry Gordy Jr. As part of her release from Motown, no mention could be made that Ballard had been a part of the best-selling trio. Eventually, Ballard signed with ABC Records on March 6, 1968, and quickly started work on her solo album. "It Doesn't Matter How I Say It (It's What I Say That Matters)" b/w "Goin' Out Of My Head" (ABC Records 11074) was released in 1968 with little fanfare, in which Ballard blamed the record company as they "just wouldn't push it [the single]". As it failed to chart, ABC Records executives brought in former Motown producer Robert Bateman and singer-songwriter Van McCoy to produce songs with Ballard. The single "Love Ain't Love" was released in September 1968. When it failed to chart, plans to release an album, tentatively titled You Don't Have To, were shelved. Songs due to appear on the album were released in 2002 by Spectrum Records, on the compilation album The Supreme Florence "Flo" Ballard.

== Reception ==
In the issue dated October 19, 1968, Cashbox listed "Love Ain't Love" in its Picks of the Week, writing, 'Though the lyrics have an often told love message, the manner in which they are presented should turn Florence Ballard into a new star on the solo scene. Former Supreme "Flo" has a brilliant time on this moving dance track with the power to break wide open on both pop and blues fronts. Expect national action.' Billboard wrote in the issue dated 2 November 1968, 'Miss Ballard, formerly of The Supremes, makes a powerful bid for solo chart honors with a pulsating Van McCoy rhythm entry' and in the 16 November issue Ed Hochs wrote the song was 'makin' noise'.

== Bibliography ==
- Benjaminson, Peter (September 1, 2009). The Lost Supreme: The Life of Dreamgirl Florence Ballard. Chicago: Chicago Review Press. ISBN 978-1-5565-2959-7.
