= The Hesitations =

- Origin: Cleveland, Ohio
- Genres: R&B
- Labels: Kapp Records, GWP Records
- Past members: George Scott; Charles Scott; Fred Deal; Robert Sheppard; Arthur Blakely; Phillip Dorroh; Leonard Veal.

The Hesitations are an American R&B group from Cleveland, Ohio.

== Background ==
Formed in 1965, they scored several hits in 1967 and 1968, the biggest being their gospel-infused version of the title track to the movie Born Free. After one of the group's singers George "King" Scott was accidentally shot and killed in February 1968, the group disbanded. The Hesitations regrouped in 2006 with new members and are performing and recording once again.

== Career ==
The Hesitations recorded the single, "Soul Superman" bw "I'm Not Built That Way" which was released on KAPP 790 in November 1966. It was a four star pick in the 12 November issue of Record World. For the week of 19 December 1966, The Hesitations single, "Soul Superman" was a Billboard Chart Spotlight, a single predicted to reach the R&B Singles chart. It would eventually make no. 42.

Their album Soul Superman was reviewed in the 3 June 1967 issue of Record World. Including their hit, the songs, "Soul Kind of Love" and "She Won't Come Back" were noted. The reviewer said that they should fly high with their package.

The group recorded the song, "Love is Everywhere" which was written by Ray Lewis, LeCharles Harper, Richard and Robert Poindexter. It was backed with "Born Free", and released on KAPP K-878. For the week of 13 January 1968, the group's version of "Born Free" debuted at no. 44 in the Billboard Best Selling R&B Singles chart. It peaked at no. 4 for the week of 24 February. It would hold that position for another week.

Their album New Born Free was reviewed in the 27 January 1968 issue of Billboard. The reviewer said that they rocked with "Overworked and Underpaid" and "Push a Little Bit Harder". The ballads, "I Wish it Could Me" and "Believe in Love". The reviewer also said all good cuts. It would make its debut at no. 30 in the Billboard Best Selling R&B LP's chart for the week of 24 February.

== Members ==
- Art Blakey (unrelated to the jazz musician)
- George Hendricks
- Williams Carter
- Joyce Blakey
- Garey Harbour - Keyboards
- Ronnie Wilson Jr. - Drums
- Clarence Smith - Bass
- Ric Kerr - Guitar
- Roger Maple - Saxophone

Note:This list is incomplete.

- George "King" Scott Deceased.
- Leonard Veal
- Fred Deal

== Discography ==
Albums

- Soul Superman (Kapp Records, 1967)
- Solid Gold (Kapp, 1968)
- The New Born Free (Kapp, 1968) US #193, US Black Albums #30
- Where We're At! (Kapp, 1968)

Charting singles

- "Soul Superman" (1967) US Black Singles #42
- "Born Free" (1968) US #38 / CAN #39
- "The Impossible Dream" (1968) US #42
- "Climb Every Mountain" (1968) US #90
- "A Whiter Shade Of Pale" (1968) US #100 / CAN #83
