= Girl Play =

2004 film by Lee Friedlander

- Theatrical release poster
- Directed by: Lee Friedlander
- Written by: Robin Greenspan, Lacie Harmon, and Lee Friedlander
- Produced by: Gina G. Goff and Laura A. Kellam (Producers), Sean McVity (Executive Producer)
- Starring: Robin Greenspan, Lacie Harmon, Mink Stole, Dom DeLuise
- Cinematography: Michael Negrin
- Edited by: Christian White
- Music by: Laura Karpman; Cara Jones
- Production company: Goff-Kellam Productions
- Distributed by: Wolfe Releasing, LOGO Network
- Release date: July 11, 2004
- Running time: 80 minutes
- Country: United States
- Language: English

Girl Play is an independent film produced in 2004 by Gina G. Goff and Laura A. Kellam of Goff-Kellam Productions. The feature film was directed by Lee Friedlander. The film premiered at Outfest in 2004, and had a limited theatrical release in 2005.

== Plot ==
Robin, who has been married for six years, and Lacie, who has never had a lasting relationship, are both cast to play lesbian lovers in a Los Angeles stage play. Innocently, the stage director, Gabriel runs the actresses through a series of rehearsals designed to "bring out the intimacy" in each performer. Soon the two women find themselves increasingly and undeniably attracted to each other and overcome with desire. They must ask themselves whether this relationship is manufactured, created for the sake of the "girl play," or is true love.

== Cast ==
- Robin Greenspan as Robin
- Lacie Harmon as Lacie
- Mink Stole as Robin's Mother
- Dom DeLuise as Gabriel
- Katherine Randolph as Audrey
- Lauren Maher as Cass
- Gina DeVivo as Robin at Age 14
- Shannon Perez as Young Robin at Age 6
- Dominic Ottersbach as Gabriel's Assistant
- Julie Briggs as Dr. Katherine
- Peter Ente as Robin's Father
- Graham T. McClusky as Parents Friend
- Skye Emerson as Bartender
- Jessica Golden as Laura, Drunk girl in bar
- Lynn A. Henderson as Attractive Girl in Bar
- Sara Bareilles as Singer in bar

== Reception ==
On the review aggregator website Rotten Tomatoes, 45% of 11 critics' reviews are positive, with an average rating of 4.0/10. Metacritic, which uses a weighted average, assigned the film a score of 37 out of 100, based on 8 critics, indicating "generally unfavorable" reviews.

== Awards ==
- L.A. Outfest "Outstanding Lesbian Feature Film"
- L.A. Outfest "Outstanding Actress In A Film" – Shared by Lead Actresses Robin Greenspan & Lacie Harmon
- Tampa International Gay and Lesbian Film Festival "Jury Award for Best Women’s Feature Film"
- Tampa International Gay and Lesbian Film Festival "Audience Award for Best Women’s Feature Film"
- Tampa International Gay and Lesbian Film Festival "Best Actress – Lacie Harmon"
- Tampa International Gay and Lesbian Film Festival "Best Director – Lee Friedlander"
- NewFest "Audience Award for Best Feature Film"
- Fort Worth Gay & Lesbian Film Festival "Best Lesbian Film"
- Philadelphia International Gay & Lesbian Film Festival "Audience Award for Best Lesbian Feature Film"
- Immagineria International Lesbian Film Festival "Audience Award for Best Feature Film"
