= The Persuaders (R&B group) =

New York City-based R&B vocal group

- Origin: New York City
- Genres: R&B
- Years active: 1969–present
- Labels: Atco, Win or Lose, Calla, Atlantic, Brunswick, CBS

The Persuaders were a New York City-based R&B vocal group best known for their gold hit single in the early 1970s, "Thin Line Between Love and Hate". It sold more than a million copies, topping the Billboard R&B chart, and was certified gold by the Recording Industry Association of America on October 29, 1971.

== Background ==
The seeds for the group were sown in 1969. The original members – Douglas "Smokey" Scott, Willie Holland, James Barnes, and Charles Stodghill – had all previously sung with other mostly local groups. Scott and Barnes had been members of The Internationals, whereas Stodghill had previously sung with the group The Topics. Holland, the last member to join, had originally sung with the Newport News, Virginia-based group, The Majestics.

The Persuaders' sound involved close harmony, Scott's rough but emotive lead vocals and a heavily orchestrated soul and R&B approach, the trademark of the Poindexter brothers, Richard and Bobby, who produced most of the early 1970s hits through their Win Or Lose production company. Some of The Persuaders' singles were also released on the Win or Lose label.

== Career ==
=== Early success ===
The Persuaders were signed by Atlantic Records in 1971 and scored an immediate hit with the iconic ode to domestic discord, "Thin Line Between Love and Hate", which topped the Black Singles chart and reached number 15 on the Pop chart. Song co-writer and producer Richard Poindexter had in fact served as one of the vocalists on the recording, as the group were still awaiting Willie Holland's arrival to complete the original four-piece lineup. An album titled after the song followed in 1972, scoring the group several more R&B chart hits, including another top ten, "Love's Gonna Pack Up (and Walk Out)". The band toured throughout the year in support of the album. Following the conclusion of the tour, Barnes parted ways with the group. Tragically, later in 1972, Stodghill died of an illness at Jacobi Medical Center in the Bronx, soon after having narrowly escaped death during an argument in a bar where his former Topics bandmate Bobby Adams had died defending him.

By 1973, and the release of their self-titled second album, Thomas Lee Hill and John Tobias, both from another local group, The Huns, had replaced Barnes and Stodghill, respectively. Bobby Poindexter produced the second album with his wife, Jackie Members, who had also been a co-writer of the "Thin Line Between Love and Hate" single. By the end of the year, Scott was the only remaining original member, flanked by Hill, Joey Coleman, and Richard Gant. The group remained at Atlantic / Atco in this incarnation for another album, Best Thing That Ever Happened to Me, released in 1974. These Atco recordings were produced by Phil Hurtt, Tony Bell, and LeBaron Taylor in Philadelphia. The group scored a number of additional R&B and pop hits during this time, including their original version of the oft-covered song "Some Guys Have All the Luck", which inched into the Pop top 40 and became their final R&B top-ten single.

=== Later career ===
The group recorded an album on the Calla label (distributed by CBS Records) in 1976, again in Philadelphia but this time with producers Robert Curington and Norman Harris, entitled It's All About Love. One track, the ballad "I Need Love" was an R&B chart hit. They later released one single on Brunswick Records in 1981, with Douglas Scott still as lead singer.

As former members left and new members trickled in, the Persuaders' R&B legacy continued into the 21st century with review groups performing their classic hits.

None of the original members are still alive. Following Stodghill's 1972 death (described above), Douglas "Smokey" Scott died in 1994, while the timing of Barnes' death is unclear. Willie Holland, identified as the last living original member of the Persuaders, died on February 13, 2016.

== Discography ==
=== Studio albums ===
Year	Title	Peak chart positions		Record label
Year	Title	US	US R&B	Record label
1972	Thin Line Between Love and Hate	141	35	Win or Lose
1973	The Persuaders	178	39	ATCO
1974	Best Thing That Ever Happened to Me	—	36	ATCO
1976	It's All About Love	—	—	Calla
"—" denotes a recording that did not chart or was not released in that territory.

=== Compilation albums ===
- The Platinum Collection (2007, Rhino/Warner Music)

=== Singles ===
Year	Title	Peak chart positions		
Year	Title	US	US R&B	CAN
1971	"Thin Line Between Love and Hate"	15	1	80
1971	"Love Gonna Pack Up (And Walk Out)"	64	8	—
1972	"If This Is What You Call Love (I Don't Want No Part of It)"	—	27	—
1972	"Peace in the Valley of Love"	104	21	—
1973	"Bad, Bold and Beautiful, Girl"	105	24	—
1973	"Some Guys Have All the Luck"	39	7	64
1974	"Best Thing That Ever Happened to Me"	85	29	—
1974	"All Strung Out on You"	—	32	—
1975	"I've Been Through This Before"	—	—	—
1977	"I Need Love"	—	34	—
1977	"The Quickest Way Out"	—	—	—
1981	"Another Time Another Place" (featuring Douglas Scott)	—	—	—
"—" denotes a recording that did not chart or was not released in that territory.
