= Now (Cara Jones album) =

NOW

Studio album by Cara Jones
- Released: 2000
- Recorded: 1999
- Genre: Singer-songwriter
- Length: 43:43
- Label: Fall Girl Records
- Producer: Michael Aharon

Cara Jones chronology
Pandora's Box (1996)	NOW (2000)

Professional ratings
Review scores
Source	Rating
Musical Discoveries	favorable link

NOW is a 2000 album by Cara Jones. It was the first international release for the million-selling singer-songwriter, whose career thus far had been mostly in Japan. The album received favorable reviews in the US and abroad, and is continually used in soundtracks for film and television.

== Track listing ==
All songs by Jones, except where otherwise noted.

1. "Spit It Out" – 3:58 – Cara Jones, Michael Aharon, Masanori Narikawa
2. "River High " – 3:42 – Cara Jones, Masanori Narikawa, Shigeru Watanabe, Norihiko Abe
3. "CandyBar" – 2:50 – Cara Jones and Michael Aharon
4. "Stay" – 3:54 – Cara Jones and Masanori Narikawa
5. "See It My Way " – 3:01 – Michael Aharon and John Anthony
6. "Choose" – 3:53
7. "Better Safe Than Sorry " – 3:44 – Steve Holloway and Cara Jones
8. "Heaven's Waiting " – 4:18
9. "1999" – 3:49
10. "Golden Thread" – 4:31 – Cara Jones and Nobuhiro Makino
11. "Settle For Love" – 5:56

The opening track, "Spit It Out", was featured in the opening scene of episode No. 501 of the popular television series, Dawsons Creek. The final track, "Settle For Love", charted on the original MP3.com at No. 1 on the Adult Alternative chart and has been featured in several films.

== Musicians ==
- Michael Aharon: guitars, keyboards and programming, piano, accordion,

bass, mandolin, bouzouki, dobro, cello, backing vocals

- Steve Holloway: drums, congas
- Chico Huff: bass
- John Anthony: percussion, drums
- Daryl Burgee: congas
- Bob Meashey: flugelhorn
- Helen Bruner and Terry Jones: backing vocals
- Jenae Freed: backing vocals
- Irene Lambrou: backing vocals
- Cara Jones: vocals, additional piano
