= I'll Be Sweeter Tomorrow (Than I Was Today) =

- The Bell Sessions

Single by The O'Jays

from the album Back on Top
- B-side: "I Dig Your Act"
- Released: 1967
- Recorded: 1967
- Genre: Pop
- Length: 3:55
- Label: Bell Records
- Songwriters: Jacquiline Members, Robert Euge Poindexter, Stanley Poindexter, Emma Jean Thomas

The O'Jays singles chronology
| "Working On Your Case" (1967) | "I'll Be Sweeter Tomorrow (Than I Was Today)" (1967) | "Look Over Your Shoulder" (1968) |

"I'll Be Sweeter Tomorrow (Than I Was Today)" (also known as "I'll Be Sweeter Tomorrow") is a 1967 hit single by the O'Jays, the group's best-selling single on Bell Records.

== Chart performance and background ==
In 1967, "I'll Be Sweeter Tomorrow (Than I Was Today)", reached No. 66 on the Billboard Hot 100 pop chart and was also a Top 10 Billboard R&B hit, peaking at # 8. The single's B-side, "I Dig Your Act", was also a popular regional hit. This song, in addition to featuring O'Jays members Eddie Levert, William Powell, and Walter Williams, also featured a fourth original member, Bobby Massey, on vocals. (The fifth original O'Jay, Bill Isles, left the group in 1965, before the group recorded for Bell Records).

== Track listing ==
1. "I'll Be Sweeter Tomorrow"
2. "I Dig Your Act"

== Instrumentation ==
Strings and some soul feel in the song are the instrumentation, as well as the feel of the fadeout.

== Other versions ==
The O'Jays re-recorded the song for their final album, The Last Word.

Artists to cover the song include:

- Linda Jones
- Joe Bataan
- The Escorts
- Beau Dollar & the Dapps.
