= Bad, Bold and Beautiful, Girl =

Single by the Persuaders

from the album The Persuaders
- B-side: "Please Stay"
- Released: March 1973
- Length: 4:10
- Label: Atco
- Composers: B. Poindexter; R. Poindexter; J. Members; R. Holloman; A. Watkins; N. Daniels
- Producer: Bobby Poindexter

The Persuaders US singles chronology
"Peace in the Valley of Love" (1972)	"Bad, Bold and Beautiful, Girl" (1973)	"Some Guys Have All the Luck" (1973)

"Bad, Bold and Beautiful, Girl" was a 1973 single for the Persuaders. It was a hit for them that year, registering in multiple US charts.

== Background ==
"Bad, Bold and Beautiful, Girl" was composed by J. Members, R. Holloman, A. Watkins and N. Daniels. It was produced by Bobby Poindexter for A-Side Productions. The arrangements were by Horace Ott. Backed with "Please Stay", it was released on Atco 6919 in 1973.

It is described in Mark Taylor's book, A Touch of Classic Soul 2 as a boisterous, somewhat country and western ballad that peaked at no. 24 on the R&B charts.

== Reception ==
The song was in the also recommended section of the Billboard Soul Picks for the week of 17 March. Along with "Please Stay" it a best cut on the album.

The single was reviewed in the 31 March 1973 issue of Record World. Crediting Bobby Poindexter as the producer and taking note of the big success generated from the single, "Thin Line Between Love and Hate", the reviewer said that this song should persuade listeners that the group is tops.

The single was on the Cash Box Choice Programming list for the week of 21 April. The list was of singles in the opinion of the Cash Box reviewers that were deserving of special programmer consideration.

== Airplay ==
According to the 31 March issue of Cash Box, "Bad, Bold Beautiful Girl" was added to the playlist of WWRL in New York. Cash Box also had the single as an R&B Addition at KGFJ in Los Angeles for the week of 14 April.

== Charts ==
For the week of 7 April, "Bad, Bold and Beautiful, Girl" made its debut at no. 117 in the Record World 101 -150 Singles chart, and it debuted at no. 63 in the Record World R&B Singles chart. Also that week, it debuted at no. 64 in the Cash Box R&B Top 65 chart. For the week of 28 April, the single had moved up from no. 45 to no. 43 in the Cash Box R&B TOP 65 chart. The following week, the chart had been renamed and restructured as the Cash Box R&B TOP 70 chart. At that time the single was at no. 41. The song reached its peak position at no. 32 in the Cash Box R&B TOP 70 chart for the week of 26 May.

For the week of 2 June, the single appeared in the Cash Box Top 100 Singles chart at no. 100.

The single made the Billboard charts, peaking at no. 105 and 24.
