= J-Wave =

Contemporary hit radio station in Tokyo

JOAV-FM
- Logo used since 2020
- Tokyo; Japan
- Broadcast area: Greater Tokyo Area
- Frequency: 81.3 MHz
- Branding: 81.3 J-Wave

Programming
- Language: Japanese
- Format: Contemporary hit radio
- Affiliations: Japan FM League

Ownership
- Owner: J-Wave Inc. (owned by Credit Saison, Nippon Broadcasting System, Kyodo News, and other stakeholders)

History
- First air date: August 1, 1988
- Call sign meaning: J-Wave

Technical information
- Power: 7,000 watts
- ERP: 57,000 watts
- HAAT: 632.2 meters (2,074 ft)
- Transmitter coordinates: 35°42′35.93″N 139°48′38.35″E
- Repeater: Minato 88.3 MHz

Links
- Webcast: J-Wave on radiko; J-Wave on Ustream
- Website: www.j-wave.co.jp

J-Wave is a commercial radio station based in Tokyo, Japan, broadcasting on 81.3 FM from the Tokyo Skytree to the Tokyo area. J-Wave airs mostly music, including J-pop, K-pop, and Western music, covering a wide range of formats. The station is considered the most popular among FM broadcasts in Tokyo, and has surprised the radio broadcast industry by gaining a higher popularity rate than an AM station (JOQR) in a survey conducted in June 2008. J-Wave was founded in October 1988, with the call sign of JOAV-FM. It is a member station of the Japan FM League (JFL) commercial radio network.

== Features ==
J-WAVE's slogan is "The Best Music on the Planet." The DJs are known as "navigators" (ナビゲーター, nabigētā). The music format can be considered a Japanese equivalent of the Western concept of Top 40 or CHR radio.

Hundreds of different jingles separate programs from commercials; they are generally played at the same decibel level and are variations on a single melody. J-Wave has been broadcast via satellite since 1994. Some of its programs also air on some community radio stations in Japan.

The instrumental song, Across The View by American musician Richard Burmer, was commissioned for J-Wave and is played during the station's sign-off.

== History ==
On December 10, 1987, J-WAVE was incorporated and started test broadcasts in the FM band on 81.3 MHz on August 1, 1988. On October 1 of that year at 5 am, it started transmission from Tokyo Tower. J-Wave was the 27th FM radio station nationwide to launch at that time, and the second in Tokyo. The name "J-WAVE" originally derived from a record shop, WAVE in Roppongi, which also belonged to "Saison Group". While other radio stations focused more on presentation, J-WAVE adopted a "more music less talk" format. The station had a large fanbase because of its unusual programming style, playing music nonstop except for jingles and breaks for news, traffic, and weather. The law in Japan at that time stipulated that programming had to be a maximum of 80% music, and a minimum of 20% talk and continuity. J-WAVE coined the term "J-pop", which is only vaguely defined but led to the eventual mirror term, K-pop.

Around 1995, J-WAVE hired new personalities in an attempt to rejuvenate itself. Its term "J-POP" became synonymous with commercially palatable Japanese music from across the spectrum, except for traditional Japanese music. Specials started to air around this time, and the station took steps to attract a listener base desirable for higher ad revenues.

On October 1, 2003, J-WAVE moved its head office to the 33rd floor of the Roppongi Hills Mori Tower in Minato, Tokyo.

On April 23, 2012, J-WAVE moved its transmitting station at Tokyo Tower to the Tokyo Sky Tree with a new transmission power of 7 kilowatts with an ERP of 57 kilowatts. Before the move, the transmission power was 10 kilowatts with an ERP of 44 kilowatts.

== Navigators (DJs) ==
Popular Navigators with "obis", or daily shows, on J-Wave (1988–1993) include:

- Jon Kabira
- Carole Hisasue
- Chris Peppler
- Cara Jones
- Barry White
- Mike Rogers

== Programs ==
=== Tokio Hot 100 ===
J-WAVE publishes the Tokyo Hot 100 singles chart which is compiled from Billboard Japan data: data for each music streaming service, download data, number of video views, CD sales data, number of tweets on Twitter. These should not be confused with the Japanese single charts, Oricon, which has its national airplay charts.

There is also a TV version shown on MTV Japan.

=== Others ===
- Saude Saudade

== Song of the year (Slam Jam) ==
- 1988: U2 — "Desire"
- 1989: Prince — "Batdance"
- 1990: Madonna — "Vogue"
- 1991: Stevie B — "Because I Love You (The Postman Song)"
- 1992: Shanice — "I Love Your Smile"
- 1993: Mariah Carey — "Dreamlover"
- 1994: Big Mountain — "Baby I Love Your Way"
- 1995: Diana King — "Shy Guy"
- 1996: Eric Clapton — "Change the World"
- 1997: Jamiroquai — "Cosmic Girl"
- 1998: Celine Dion — "My Heart Will Go On"
- 1999: Jamiroquai — "Canned Heat"
- 2000: Madonna — "Music"
- 2001: Janet Jackson — "All for You"
- 2002: Underworld — "Two Months Off"
- 2003: Beyoncé featuring Jay-Z — "Crazy in Love"
- 2004: Avril Lavigne — "Don't Tell Me"
- 2005: Def Tech — "My Way"
- 2006: Sharlene Boodram — "Sweeta Sweeta"
- 2007: Beyoncé — "Irreplaceable"
- 2008: Leona Lewis — "Bleeding Love"
