= Saude Saudade (J-Wave) =

Japanese radio program

Saude! Saudade... is a Japanese radio program specializing in music from Brazil, the Caribbean, and Latin America. It is produced and broadcast on J-Wave, an FM radio station based in Tokyo, Japan. Its official title includes its corporate sponsor where the sponsor's name is before the program title, i.e. Noevir Saude! Saudade.... Past sponsors include Japan Airlines and Kikkoman, whose names were also part of the official programme title. It is a weekly programme, broadcast every Sunday afternoon from 5:00 pm to 5:54 pm Japan time.

== Summary ==
Its title combines two Portuguese words: "Saúde," meaning "health," commonly used as a toast or well-wishing expression, and "Saudade," a term denoting a deep emotional state of nostalgic longing for someone or something absent. These words encapsulate key aspects of Brazilian culture and sentiment. Because most listeners are Japanese residents in greater Tokyo area, it features Japanese-Latin artists such as Lisa Ono. The programme has its own award Brazil Disc Award, as well as special theme events at clubs. It has a monthly Portuguese DJ rotation to appeal to the growing Brazilian communities throughout Japan. The current program navigator as of April 2010 is Christel Takigawa.

It is one of the longest serving programs within J-Wave, with no interruption since the station's founding in 1988.
