= George Kerr (musician) =

- Born: Ocilla, Georgia, United States
- Genres: Soul R&B
- Occupations: Musician, producer, arranger
- Labels: Shout, All Platinum, Harbor Light Records
- Member of: The Serenaders, Imperials, George Kerr and His Orchestra, Blood Brothers, Kerr

George Kerr is a musician and record producer who has worked with a multitude of recording artists during the 1960s and 1970s.

== Background ==
Kerr was born in Ocilla, Georgia. The artists Kerr has worked with include, Florence Ballard, The Escorts, Linda Jones, The Moments, The O'Jays, and The Whatnauts. George Kerr has been connected with All Platinum Records and Sylvia Robinson. He was also a Motown recording artist As an artist he had a hit with "Hey Girl". He recorded an album for the All Platinum label, If This World Were Mine.

== Career as musician ==
At some stage in the 1950s, George Kerr formed a group called The Serenaders in Newark, NJ with his friends Sidney Barnes, Howard Curry and Timothy Wilson. Later, Richard Barrett had placed an ad in the paper for auditions for a lead singer for the group, Imperials. Kerr and his friend Sidney Barnes applied for the role. It was Kerr that ended up securing the position. Kerr was the lead singer on "Faithfully Yours" that was released on the Carlton label. In 1962, Kerr left The Imperials and returned to his old group The Serenaders. It wouldn't be long until Kerr had moved into composition and producing.

== Career as producer and composer ==
=== 1960s ===
George Kerr and Sidney Barnes wrote the song, "A Love So Fine" which was recorded by The Chiffons. It was released on Laurie 3195 in 1963. For the week of 14 September, it entered the Cash Box Top 100 Singles chart at no. 79. Having been in the chart for five weeks, it peaked at no. 38 for the week of 12 October. It would hold that position for another week.

George Kerr was approached by the Poindexter Brothers who wrote a song called "Hypnotized". They came with a girlfriend (possibly Jackie Members) to perform the song. Kerr was impressed with the song but not the girl. Kerr went to friend of his called Jerry Harris and told him he needed a girl singer. Kerr said he had the ideal singer for the song. Linda Jones was the singer that was used. Three days later they were at New York's A-1 Studios. Jones did a run-through of the song and was unaware that Kerr had already asked engineer Herb Abramson to turn on the recording switch on. When Jones had finished, she said to Kerr that she was ready. She wanted to re-do it because she had mispronounced the song title, but Kerr was happy with it. Kerr did the rounds with the song before Loma Records bought it. It was selling 15,000 copies a week then peaked at no. 4 in the Billboard Top Selling R&B Singles chart for the week of 5 August 1967. It held that position for an additional two weeks.

Kerr produced the single Poindexter Brothers composed song, "Baby Baby Please" for Timothy Wilson which was an R&B hit in 1967.

=== 1970s ===
Two of Kerr's productions were in Billboards Soul Recommended section for the week ending August 25, 1973. They were "Your Gonna Need Somebody to Love (Wide You're Looking for Someone to Love)" by Barbara Jean English and "I Wasn't There" by The Whatnauts.

He produced the single for the New Foundations. The song, "Darling (You're All I Need)", a soul ballad which was released on Atlantic 45-3225. This New Foundations, a group from the United States had no connection with the English group, the New Foundations who released "Something for My Baby" / "I Need Your Love" on Pye 45533.

He produced "Baby (I’m Gonna Love You)" for Phyllis Hyman which was released in 1976.

=== 1980s ===
Along with Rod Armstrong and Marvin Brown, Kerr produced an album that featured the groups, Softones & First Class. The album Together was released on the new label, Park-Way Records in 1980.

His production of the group Kerr and the single "Back At Ya", released on Greyhound GRPT-107 in 1984 had a brief review in James Hamilton's Disco's section of the 17 March 1984 issue of Record Mirror.
