= Born Free (Matt Monro song) =

1966 song

Single by Matt Monro

from the album Born Free soundtrack
- B-side: "Other People"
- Released: 1966
- Genre: Pop
- Length: 3:07
- Label: Capitol
- Composer: John Barry
- Lyricist: Don Black

Matt Monro singles chronology
"Beyond the Hill" (1966)	"Born Free" (1966)	"Honey on the Vine" (1966)

"Born Free"

Single by Roger Williams

from the album Born Free
- B-side: "Jimmie's Train"
- Released: July 1966
- Length: 2:22
- Label: Kapp
- Composer: John Barry
- Lyricist: Don Black
- Producer: Hy Grill

Roger Williams singles chronology
"Lara's Theme from 'Dr. Zhivago'" (1966)	"Born Free" (1966)	"Sunrise, Sunset" (1967)

"Born Free" is a popular song with music by John Barry and lyrics by Don Black. It was written for the 1966 film of the same name and won an Academy Award for Best Original Song.

== Original version ==
The song's composers, John Barry and Don Black, asked British singer Matt Monro, who was managed by Black at the time, to record the song for the film's soundtrack. The producers of the film considered the song uncommercial, however, and deleted it from the print shown at its Royal Command premiere in London. When Monro, who attended the event, made Black aware of the edit, they successfully lobbied the producers to restore it. Monro's interpretation appeared over the closing credits in a shortened version recorded especially for the film, which enabled it to qualify for the Academy Award. Monro's complete commercial recording was released on the film's soundtrack album and became the singer's signature tune for the remainder of his career.

== Charted versions ==
Matt Monro's version never charted. However, Roger Williams recorded a cover that was noted for its use of a male chorus, heard in the second half of the song after the instrumental section. The song reached number seven on the Billboard Hot 100 and number one on the Adult contemporary chart for six non-consecutive weeks in September/October 1966.

The R&B group the Hesitations recorded a cover that peaked at number 38 on the US Billboard Hot 100 in 1968.

"Born Free" also appeared on the Vic Reeves album I Will Cure You. Released as a single, this version peaked at number 6 in the UK Singles Chart in 1991.

== Other ==
In 1992, during a state of emergency in Thailand, the song was broadcast over the airwaves.

== In popular culture ==
In 1970, Alberto-Culver launched its "Born Free" shampoo, paying "more than $20,000" for a year's advertising use of the song.

In Madagascar, a version performed by the Tabernacle Choir can be heard in the opening sequence where Marty daydreams about prancing around in the African landscape before being interrupted and awakened by Alex.

The Dexter episode "Born Free" was titled after the song. The song is also featured in the episode as the titular character searches for clues about the Ice Truck Killer, though the Andy Williams cover is used instead of Monro's original version.

== See also ==
- List of Billboard Easy Listening number ones of 1966
