= Cara Jones =

American female singer-songwriter (born 1964)

Cara Jones (born Joan Cara Stein in 1964) is an American singer, songwriter, and voice actress.

== Career ==
As a singer and songwriter, she has sold over 1.2 million physical copies of her songs in Japan. In the United States and elsewhere, her music can be heard on the popular syndicated television series Dawson's Creek, as well as a number of feature films. \ As a voice talent, Cara is heard worldwide as the English voice of the GPS car navigation systems of the Jaguar, models of the Cadillac, Mercedes-Benz, Land Rover, Ford and more. She announced the 1998 Winter Olympics at Nagano, voiced hundreds of commercials, as well as popular PlayStation and Sega games. In addition, Cara spent 7 years as a prime time DJ on Tokyo's popular FM station, J-Wave. Also helmed radio shows at FM Yokohama, Bay FM (Japan), CBC Radio (Nagoya) Chubu-Nippon Broadcasting.

== Personal life ==
She has one child, born in 2007, and one husband.

== Voice talent ==
=== Games ===
- Shenmue: Hisaka Sawano, Mayumi Mishima, Lidia Bennett
- Tekken 3: Julia Chang (1998 game)
- Einhänder: Hyperion's Computer Voice
- Arc the Lad II: Shante's Singing Voice
- Fighting Vipers: Jane

=== Other ===
- Cara Jones announced the medalists of all outdoor events at the 1998 Winter Olympics at Nagano.
- Cara Jones was the US English voice of the Denso GPS car navigation system of models of the Jaguar, Land Rover, Cadillac, and Mercedes Benz.
- DJ at J-Wave 81.3 FM in Tokyo on programs "Tokio Cold Cuts", "The Essential Love Collection", "Optune Midnight Faces", “Behind the Hits”
- Got start in radio at WHRB at Harvard University. Hosted "Folkways" show.
- Cara Jones voiced commercials or industrials for PNC, Pampers, Sony, Xerox, Mazda, Mitsubishi, Agnes B., Shick, Toyota, Phillip Morris, Japan Air Lines, Harry Winston, Volvo, Canon, Deutsche Telecom, Ansett Australia Airlines, Kirin Beer, Toshiba EMI, Coca-Cola, Tokyo Electric Power Co, Land Rover, Komatsu, Shiseido, Suntory, NHK, Panasonic, Paralympics, ANA Airlines, Hustler Casino, BBQs Galore, Planet Fitness, Time Warner.
- Chage and Aska: Narrator on album "Yin & Yang".
- Cara Jones wrote and co-hosted a weekly radio program with Barry White.
- Cara Jones is known for radio interviews with Harry Connick Jr.; The Manhattan Transfer; Charlie Watts; Shaggy (musician); David Sanborn; Karla Bonoff; Suzanne Vega; Shawn Colvin; Mary Chapin Carpenter; Jellyfish.
- Cara Jones wrote the liner notes to the Japanese release of Fat City by Shawn Colvin.
- Cara Jones was asked to write original English lyrics to the classic Japanese song Miagete Goran Yoru no Hoshi o by Rokusuke Ei and composer Taku Izumi. Her version was recorded by Jazz singer Harumi Kaneko and R&B singer Melodie Sexton.
- Cara Jones wrote the lyrics for English-language versions of hits by Japanese rock band The Yellow Monkey, including "Bulb" and "Sugar Fix" (reached No. 18 on Oricon chart).
- Cara Jones sang the song "You Are My Sky" from "Pandora's Box" at the wedding of actress and singer Yū Hayami.
- Cara Jones is a Multilingual voiceover producer at Carasmatic Productions (www.carasmatic.com).

== Singer-songwriter ==
=== TV – Film – Games ===
- Dawsons Creek: The song "Spit It Out" was featured in episode No. 511 "Something Wild"
- Arc the Lad II: The singing voice of Shante on "Musicman"; lyricist on "Musicman"
- Legend of Heroes IV: Vocals and lyrics on "One Bead of Scarlet"
- Tobe Pegasus!: Lyrics on "The Simple Things"
- Girl Play (2004 Feature Film): Original music, "Whisper Love" (music, lyrics, vocals)
- Give or Take an Inch (2003 Short Film): Original music
- Sugar Sweet (2001 Feature Film): Original music

=== Discography ===
==== Solo albums ====
Year	Album	Notes	Availability
2000	NOW	Originally released in 1999 in Japan by Warner Music Group (WEA). Released worldwide in 2000 by Fall Girl Records fully remixed, remastered and with new cover art.	Available on carajones.com or CD Baby, iTunes, Spotify, BandCamp
1996	Pandora's Box	Released in 1996 in Japan by Teichiku Records. Remixed and remastered world-wide release April 2020 by Fall Girl Records/Carasmatic.	BandCamp, iTunes, Spotify and all digital services
1994	Different Skies	Originally released in 1994 in Japan. Released worldwide by Fall Girl Records.	Available on carajones.com or CD Baby

==== Other Artists (highlights) ====
Artist	Album/Single	Song	Label Info
Puffy AmiYumi	An Illustrated History	"True Asia”	Bar None Records (BRN-CD-128 released 10.02 – USA)
Puffy AmiYumi	The Monsters Project 2002	"True Asia”	Sony Records (SRCL-5115 released 10.24.01 – Korea and Japan)
Yoshitaka Minami	Nude Voice	"SkyBlue"	Victor Entertainment (VICJ-60740 released 2.21.01 – Japan)
The Yellow Monkey	Sugar Fix (maxi-single)	"Sugar Fix" and "Bulb”	Japan – Fun House Records (FHCF-2428 released 8.21.98), UK – BMG Records (74321 -605372 released 8.12.98). Reached No. 18 on Oricon chart.
Zabadak	Oto	"Fatal Flaw" and "14 no Oto"	Pioneer LDC (BICL-5009 released 1.27.99)
Mimori Yusa	Harmonica Beach	"Clover"	Toshiba-Emi (ESDB-3740 released 1.22.97 – Japan)
Harumi Kaneko	Try To Remember	"Stars Up in the Sky"	Philips (PHCE-34 released 1992, Japan)
