= Thin Line Between Love and Hate =

1971 single by vocal group The Persuaders

- A-side label of U.S. vinyl single

Single by the Persuaders

from the album Thin Line Between Love and Hate
- B-side: "Thigh Spy"
- Released: August 1971
- Genre: Rock; soul
- Length: 3:16
- Label: Atco
- Songwriters: Richard Poindexter; Robert Poindexter; Jackie Members
- Producers: Richard Poindexter; Robert Poindexter

The Persuaders singles chronology
"Thin Line Between Love and Hate" (1971)	"Love Gonna Pack Up (And Walk Out)" (1971)

"Thin Line Between Love and Hate" is a 1971 song by the New York City-based R&B vocal group The Persuaders. The song was written and produced by the Poindexter Brothers, Robert and Richard, and was also co-written by Robert's wife, Jackie Members.

== Composition ==
The song tells a story about a man coming home early in the morning to his understanding wife one too many times; after the song's bridge, he finds himself lying in a hospital, bandaged from head to foot.

== Charts ==
This was the group's biggest hit song, spending two weeks atop the Billboard R&B chart in late 1971. It also reached number 15 on the Billboard Hot 100 chart and was certified Gold by the RIAA.

Chart (1971)	Peak position
U.S. Billboard Hot 100	15
U.S. Billboard Best Selling Soul Singles	1

== Cover versions ==
The song has been covered or sampled by many musical acts.

- The rock band the Pretenders recorded a cover version of this song, included on their 1984 album Learning to Crawl. Featuring Paul Carrack on keyboards and backing vocals, it was released as a single, peaking at number 83 on the Billboard Hot 100 chart and number 49 on the UK Singles Chart. This version changed the lyric from first-person viewpoint to second-person.
- Jamaican reggae singer B.B. Seaton recorded a version as the title track of his 1973 album for Trojan Records.
- In 1995, Annie Lennox recorded a cover with slightly modified lyrics, with a second-person viewpoint and additional final verses, featured on her second solo album Medusa.
- In 1996, R&B vocal trio H-Town recorded the song, which was included in the Martin Lawrence comedy film of the same name. Released as "A Thin Line Between Love & Hate", this version featured Roger Troutman, and Shirley Murdock on female vocals and reached #6 on the Billboard R&B chart and number 37 on the Billboard Hot 100.

== See also ==
- List of Best Selling Soul Singles number ones of 1971
