= Linda Jones =

American soul singer (1944–1972)

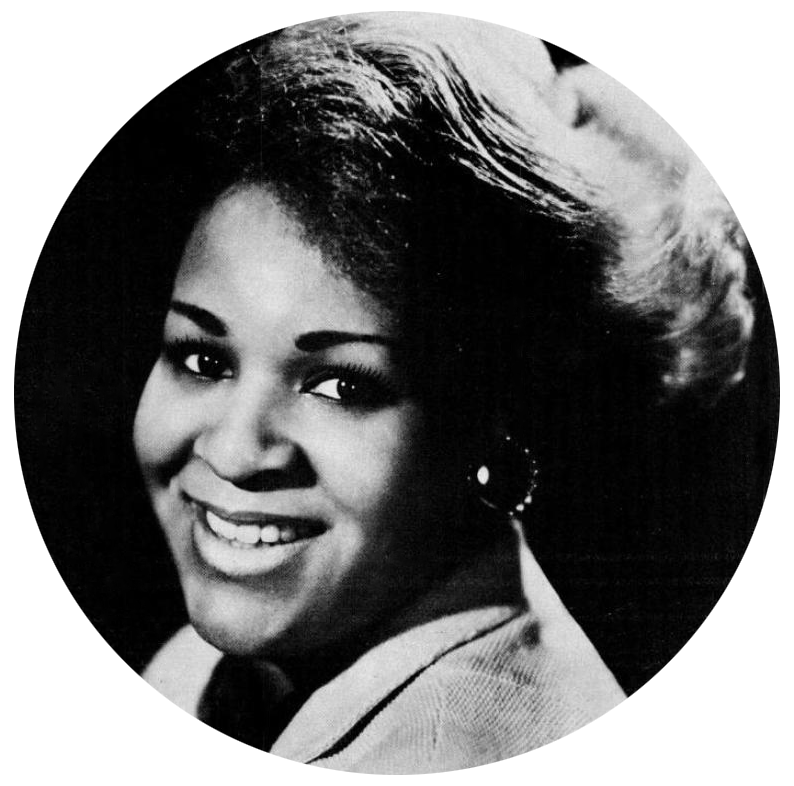
- Linda Jones in 1967

Background information
- Born: December 14, 1944; Newark, New Jersey, U.S.
- Died: March 14, 1972 (aged 27) Newark, New Jersey, U.S.
- Genre: Soul
- Occupation: Singer
- Years active: 1963–1972

Linda Jones (December 14, 1944 – March 14, 1972) was an American soul singer with a strong gospel-influenced style who had the 1967 top 10 R&B hit single, "Hypnotized".

== Biography ==
Jones was born in Newark, New Jersey, United States. She started singing in her family's gospel group, the Jones Singers at the age of six. Her first recording was "Lonely Teardrops" under the name of Linda Lane on Cub Records in 1963. She was found performing at a local club by songwriter Jerry Harris who introduced her to producer George Kerr. After unsuccessful singles on Atco Records in 1964 and Blue Cat Records the following year, Kerr took her to Warner Bros. Records' R&B subsidiary, Loma Records in 1967. The first Loma release proved to be her biggest success, the ballad, "Hypnotized" reached No. 4 on the Billboard R&B chart and No. 21 on the Hot 100. This proved to be the label's best-selling record and it was followed by two further hits, including "What've I Done (To Make You Mad)" (No. 8 R&B, No. 61 pop), and an album.

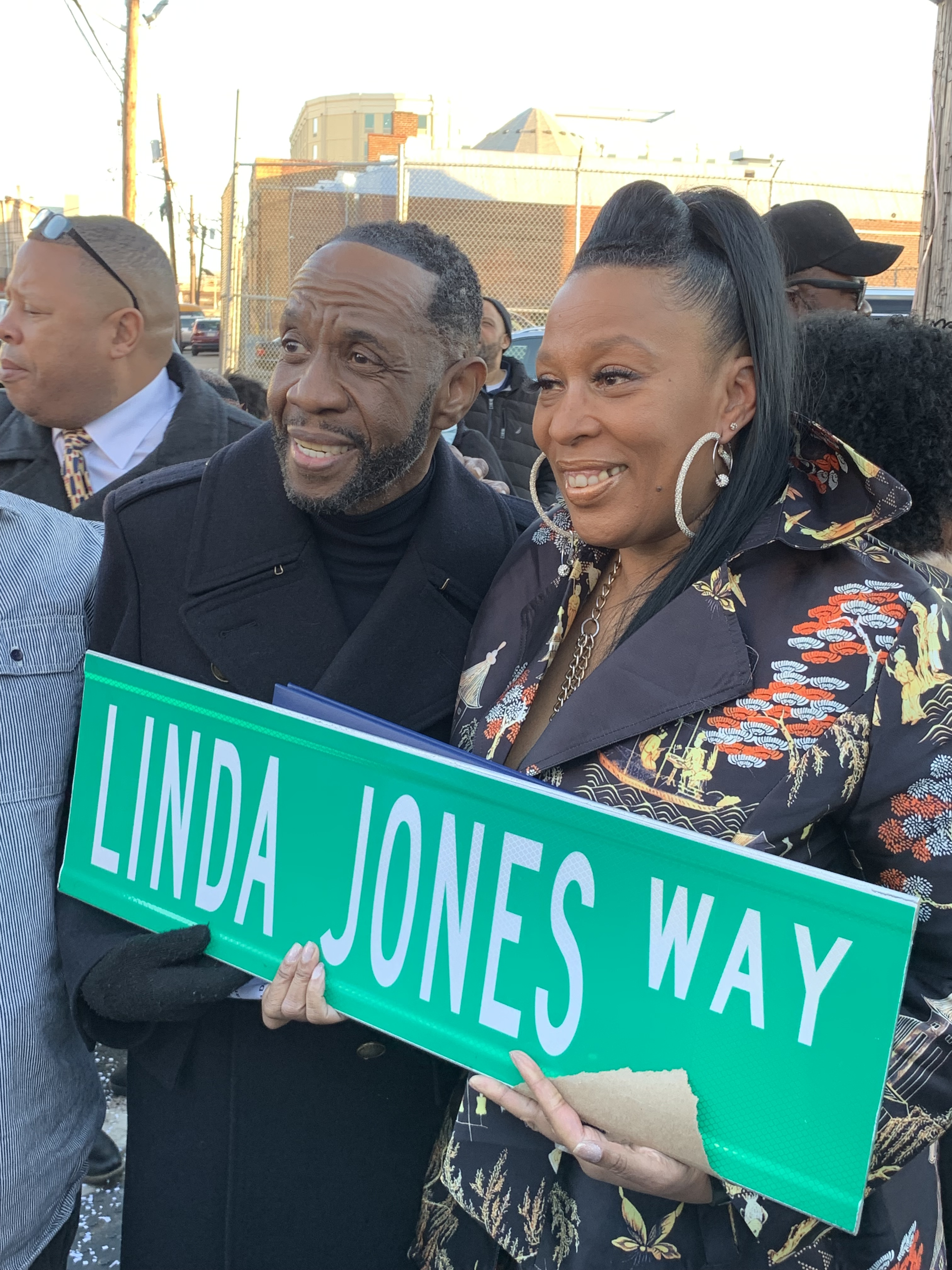
Linda Jones Way December 14, 2021 Singer Freddie Jackson and Terry Jones

After Loma closed in late 1968, Jones had a final single on the main Warner label before joining Neptune Records, run by Philadelphia record producers, Kenny Gamble and Leon Huff. Two singles, both produced by Kerr, saw some R&B success before she signed for All Platinum subsidiary, Turbo Records, in New Jersey in 1971. A powerful revamped version of the former Jerry Butler and The Impressions hit, "For Your Precious Love" reached both the R&B (No. 15) and pop (No. 74) charts in 1972 and saw her career take off again. Reviewing her 1972 album, Your Precious Love, in Christgau's Record Guide: Rock Albums of the Seventies (1981), Robert Christgau wrote: "Jones isn't too long on artistry—she likes to dispense with formality and just start at the climax throwing her emotions and her high notes all over material like 'Dancing in the Street' and 'I Can't Make it Alone.' Pretty amazing, in its way, and definitely recommended to people who always get out of their cars to look at waterfalls and strange rock formations."

Shortly after the end of her national tour supporting the album, Jones died at her mother's home at the age of 27, while resting between matinee and evening shows at New York City's Apollo Theater in Harlem. She had diabetes for most of her life and slipped into a coma while sleeping.

== Legacy ==
All Platinum put out three albums of previously issued and unreleased material after her death and in 2008 her daughter Terry Jones, along with Helen Bruner, produced an album entitled, "Soul Talkin" featuring her mother's vocals. One of the tracks, "Baby I Know" was nominated for a Grammy Award at the 51st Awards Ceremony in 2008.

On June 3, 2021, The Grammy Museum in Newark, New Jersey added artifacts of Jones to their New Jersey Legends Exhibit, which has been a feature since 2017, that includes Frank Sinatra, Dionne Warwick, The Sugar Hill Gang, The Rascals, Melba Moore, Naughty By Nature and others.

On December 14, 2021, The City of Newark, New Jersey, honored Jones with renaming Sherman Avenue, the street she lived on, to Linda Jones Way. Her daughter Terry Jones and singer Helen Burner were in attendance to accept the honor. Producer George Kerr and recording artists Freddie Jackson, Stuart Bascombe of Black Ivory, and Dolores Milligan of the band Skyy were also in attendance.

== Discography ==
=== Albums ===
Year	Album	Chart positions		Record label
Year	Album	US	US R&B	Record label
1967	Hypnotized	—	26	Loma Records
1972	For Your Precious Love	—	35	Turbo Records
1972	Let It Be Me	—	—	Turbo Records
1972	A Portrait Of Linda Jones	—	—	Turbo Records
2008	Soul Talkin	—	—	Philerzy Productions
"—" denotes a recording that did not chart.

=== Compilation albums ===
Year	Album	Record label
1974	Greatest Hits	Turbo
1976	This Is Loma Volume 7 (The Great J.J. Jackson/Hypnotized)	Loma, WEA
1988	Golden Classics	Collectables
1991	Your Precious Love	Sequel Records
2002	Greatest Hits	Empire Musicwerks
2009	Linda Jones Meets Ruby Andrew	Collectables
2011	Hits Anthology	Essential Media Group
2014	The Complete Atco, Loma & Warner Brothers	Real Gone Music, SoulMusic Records, Rhino Records
2016	Precious (The Anthology 1963-72)	Kent Soul

=== Singles ===
Year	Title	Chart positions			
Year	Title	US	US R&B	CAN	CAN R&B
1967	"Hypnotized"	21	4	28	7
1967	"What've I Done (To Make You Mad)"	61	8	—	—
1968	"Give My Love a Try"	93	34	—	—
1969	"My Heart (Will Understand)"	—	—	—	—
1970	"I'll Be Sweeter Tomorrow"	—	45	—	—
1970	"That's When I'll Stop Loving You"	—	40	—	—
1971	"Stay With Me Forever"	—	47	—	—
1972	"Not on the Outside"	—	32	—	—
1972	"Your Precious Love"	74	15	—	—
"—" denotes releases that did not chart or were not released in that territory.

== See also ==
- 27 Club
